= 2020 Minnesota elections =

2020 Minnesota general election
- November 3, 2020
- Turnout: 79.96%

A general election was held in the U.S. state of Minnesota on November 3, 2020. All seats in the Minnesota Senate and Minnesota House of Representatives were up for election as well as several judicial seats, Minnesota's 10 presidential electors, a United States Senate seat, Minnesota's eight seats in the United States House of Representatives, and several positions for local offices. A primary election to nominate major party candidates and several judicial and local primary elections were held on August 11, 2020.

== Electoral system ==
Elections for state and federal offices were held via first-past-the-post voting. The candidate or bloc of presidential electors that wins the most votes will be elected. Nominations for parties with major party status—the DFL, Grassroots–Legalize Cannabis, Legal Marijuana Now, and Republican parties—were determined by an open primary election. The candidate that won the most votes in each party became their party's nominee for the general election. If only a single candidate sought the nomination for each party, a primary election for that office was not held.

Judicial and several local elections will be held via a nonpartisan blanket primary. Each voter had up to as many votes as there are positions to be filled. Voters could vote for a candidate not more than once. The top number of candidates that won the most votes in the primary election that was twice the number of positions to be filled advanced to the general election. If not more than twice the number of candidates to be elected sought election, a primary election was not held. Most cities, school districts, and all townships and hospital districts did not hold a primary election—instead, all candidates appeared at the general election. The top number of candidates that win the most votes in the general election that is equal to the number of positions to be filled will be elected. Judicial and local elections are nonpartisan.

The candidate filing period was from May 19 to June 2, 2020. The filing period for cities, townships, school districts, and hospital districts that did not hold a primary election was from July 28 to August 11, 2020.

== Federal elections ==
=== President ===
Minnesota's 10 electors in the Electoral College were up for election, who would subsequently cast votes for president and vice president on December 14, 2020.

Minnesota had voted for the Democratic nominee in every presidential election since 1976, the longest streak of any U.S. state as of the 2016 election. The Democratic nominee in 2016, Hillary Clinton, won Minnesota by less than two percentage points over Republican nominee Donald Trump.

=== United States Senate ===
Minnesota's class 2 United States Senate seat was up for election. Incumbent DFL Senator Tina Smith was originally appointed in 2018 by Governor Mark Dayton to replace Senator Al Franken after he resigned. Smith won a special election and is seeking election to her first full term in the Senate. The DFL had held Minnesota's class 2 U.S. Senate seat since 2009 when Al Franken defeated Republican incumbent Norm Coleman after a protracted recount following the 2008 election. Lieutenant Governor Tina Smith was appointed in January 2018 by Governor Mark Dayton to replace Franken after he resigned following sexual harassment allegations. Smith won her first election in the 2018 special election.

Former U.S. Representative Jason Lewis was the Republican nominee. Other candidates included Legal Marijuana Now Party candidate Kevin O'Connor and Grassroots–Legalize Cannabis Party candidate Oliver Steinberg. Candidates who lost the primary election for the Republican nomination included John Berman, Bob Carney, Cynthia Gail, and James Reibestein. Candidates who lost the primary election for the DFL nomination included Steve Carlson, Ahmad Hassan, Paula Overby, and Christopher Seymore.

=== United States House of Representatives ===
Minnesota's eight seats in the United States House of Representatives were up for election. The DFL held five seats and the Republicans held three seats.

== State elections ==
=== Legislative elections ===
==== Minnesota Senate ====
All 67 seats in the Minnesota Senate were up for election. The Republicans held a majority of 35 seats and the DFL held 32 seats. The Republicans had held a majority in the Senate since the 2016 election.

==== Minnesota House of Representatives ====
All 134 seats in the Minnesota House of Representatives were up for election. The DFL held a majority of 75 seats and the Republicans held 59 seats. The DFL had held a majority in the House since the 2018 election.

=== Judicial elections ===
One seat on the Minnesota Supreme Court was up for election. Justice Paul Thissen was up for his first election following his appointment in 2018 by Governor Mark Dayton. Four seats on the Minnesota Court of Appeals and several seats on the Minnesota District Courts were also up for election.

== Local elections ==
Elections for several subdivisions were held, including elections for counties, municipalities, school districts, and hospital districts.

=== Counties ===
All 87 counties held regular elections. 37 counties held primary elections. Five counties also held special elections on the day of the general election. Kanabec County had a ballot question on the day of the general election.

All counties held elections for:

- Half of the members of the county board of commissioners (including one special election)

Some counties held elections for one or more of the following:

- Half of the members of the soil and water conservation district board of supervisors (all counties except Hennepin and Ramsey, including four special elections)
- Half of the members of the Three Rivers Park District board of commissioners (Hennepin County, excluding Minneapolis)
- Ballot question (Kanabec County)

List of counties holding primary elections
- Anoka
- Beltrami
- Benton
- Big Stone
- Blue Earth
- Carlton
- Carver
- Chippewa
- Cook
- Crow Wing
- Dakota
- Faribault
- Fillmore
- Freeborn
- Goodhue
- Hennepin
- Houston
- Kanabec
- Kandiyohi
- Kittson
- Lincoln
- McLeod
- Meeker
- Morrison
- Olmsted
- Otter Tail
- Pennington
- Ramsey
- Renville
- Rice
- St. Louis
- Sibley
- Stearns
- Wabasha
- Wadena
- Winona
- Wright

=== Municipalities ===
829 cities and 656 townships held regular elections. 32 cities held primary elections. 101 cities and 51 townships held special elections. Bemidji and Minneapolis each held a special election on the day of the primary election. All other special elections were held on the day of the general election. Bloomington, Minneapolis, and Minnetonka did not have regularly scheduled elections, but each had one or more ballot questions on the day of the general election. Jeffers had a ballot question on the day of the primary election. 22 cities and 12 townships had one or more ballot questions on the day of the general election.

Cities held elections for one or more of the following:

- Mayor (735 cities, including seven special elections)
- Half of the members of the city council (826 cities and 94 special elections in 94 cities)
- Clerk-treasurer (9 cities, including two special elections)
- Clerk (32 cities, including one special election)
- Treasurer (34 cities, including one special election)
- Half of the members of the public works/utilities/sanitary district board of directors (four cities)
- Ballot questions (23 cities)

Townships held elections for one or more of the following:

- Half of the members of the town board of supervisors (655 townships and 32 special elections in 31 townships)
- Clerk-treasurer (24 townships, including one special election)
- Clerk (331 townships, including 12 special elections)
- Treasurer (218 townships, including eight special elections)
- Ballot questions (12 townships)

List of cities and townships holding elections
- Acoma Township
- Ada^{1, 2}
- Adams
- Adrian
- Adrian Township
- Afton
- Agassiz Township
- Agder Township
- Aitkin
- Aitkin Township
- Akeley^{1}
- Akeley Township
- Akron Township, Big Stone County
- Albany
- Albert Lea
- Alberta
- Albertville
- Alborn Township
- Alden
- Alden Township, Freeborn County
- Aldrich
- Alexandria^{3}
- Alfsborg Township
- Alma Township
- Almond Township
- Alpha
- Altura
- Alvarado
- Alvwood Township
- Amboy
- Amboy Township
- Amiret Township
- Amo Township
- Andover
- Ann Township
- Annandale
- Anoka^{3}
- Ansel Township
- Apple Valley
- Appleton^{2}
- Appleton Township
- Arbo Township
- Arco
- Arden Hills
- Ardenhurst Township
- Arena Township
- Argyle
- Arlington
- Arlington Township
- Arthur Township, Traverse County
- Artichoke Township
- Arveson Township
- Ashby
- Askov
- Athens Township
- Atkinson Township
- Atwater
- Audubon^{1}
- Augsburg Township
- Augusta Township
- Austin^{3}
- Automba Township
- Avoca
- Avon
- Babbitt
- Backus
- Badger
- Badger Township
- Badoura Township
- Bagley
- Balaton
- Ball Bluff Township
- Barber Township^{2}
- Barclay Township
- Barnum
- Barnum Township
- Barrett
- Barry
- Barto Township
- Battle Lake
- Battle Plain Township
- Baudette^{1}
- Baxter
- Bayport
- Baytown Township
- Bear Park Township
- Beardsley
- Bearville Township
- Beauford Township
- Beaver Bay
- Beaver Bay Township
- Beaver Creek
- Beaver Township, Aitkin County^{1}
- Beaver Township, Roseau County
- Becker^{1}
- Becker Township, Cass County
- Bejou
- Belgrade
- Belgrade Township
- Belle Plaine
- Belle Plaine Township
- Bellechester
- Bellingham
- Beltrami
- Belview
- Bemidji^{2, 3, 4, 5}
- Bena^{1}
- Bennington Township
- Benton Township
- Bergen Township
- Bernadotte Township
- Bertha
- Beseman Township^{1}
- Bethel
- Beulah Township
- Big Bend Township
- Big Falls
- Big Lake^{1}
- Big Lake Township^{1}
- Big Stone Township
- Big Woods Township
- Bigelow
- Bigfork
- Bigfork Township
- Bingham Lake
- Birch Lake Township
- Birchwood Village
- Bird Island
- Bird Island Township^{1}
- Biscay
- Bismarck Township
- Biwabik^{2}
- Black River Township
- Blackberry Township
- Blackduck^{1}
- Blackhoof Township
- Blaine^{3}
- Blakeley Township
- Blind Lake Township
- Blomkest
- Bloom Township
- Bloomer Township
- Blooming Prairie
- Bloomington^{2, 6}
- Blue Earth
- Blue Earth City Township^{2}
- Bluffton^{1}
- Bock
- Boon Lake Township
- Borup
- Bovey
- Bowlus
- Bowstring Township^{1}
- Boxville Township
- Boy Lake Township
- Boy River Township
- Boyd
- Bradbury Township
- Braham
- Brainerd^{1}
- Brandon^{1}
- Brandon Township
- Bray Township
- Breckenridge
- Breezy Point
- Brevator Township
- Brewster
- Bricelyn
- Brighton Township
- Brislet Township
- Brook Park
- Brooklyn Center^{3}
- Brooklyn Park^{3}
- Brooks
- Brookston
- Brooten
- Browerville
- Browns Valley
- Browns Valley Township
- Brownsdale
- Brownsville
- Brownton
- Bruce Township
- Bruno
- Brunswick Township
- Buckman^{1}
- Buffalo
- Buffalo Lake
- Buhl
- Bull Moose Township
- Bungo Township
- Burnstown Township
- Burnsville
- Burtrum
- Buse Township
- Butler Township
- Butterfield
- Butterfield Township
- Butternut Valley Township
- Byron^{1}
- Byron Township, Cass County^{1}
- Caledonia
- Callaway
- Calumet^{1}
- Cambria Township
- Cambridge^{3}
- Camden Township
- Camp Release Township
- Campbell
- Canby^{1}
- Cannon Falls
- Cannon Township
- Canton
- Caribou Township^{1}
- Carlos
- Carlos Township
- Carlston Township
- Carlton
- Carpenter Township^{1, 2}
- Carver
- Cashel Township
- Cass Lake^{1}
- Cedar Lake Township
- Cedar Mills
- Cedar Township, Marshall County
- Cedarbend Township
- Center City
- Centerville^{1}
- Ceresco Township
- Ceylon
- Champlin
- Chandler
- Chanhassen
- Chaska
- Chatfield
- Cherry Grove Township
- Chester Township, Polk County
- Chickamaw Beach^{1}
- Chisago City
- Chisholm
- Chokio
- Clara City
- Claremont
- Clarissa
- Clark Township, Aitkin County
- Clarkfield
- Clarks Grove
- Clay Township
- Clear Lake
- Clearbrook
- Clearwater
- Clearwater Township
- Clements
- Cleveland
- Cleveland Township
- Clifton Township, Traverse County
- Climax
- Clinton
- Clitherall
- Clontarf
- Clontarf Township
- Cloquet^{3}
- Clover Township, Hubbard County^{1}
- Clover Township, Mahnomen County
- Clow Township^{1}
- Coates
- Cobden
- Cohasset
- Cokato^{1}
- Cold Spring
- Coleraine
- Cologne^{1}
- Columbia Heights^{3}
- Columbus
- Comfort Township
- Comfrey
- Como Township
- Comstock
- Comstock Township
- Conger^{1}
- Cook
- Coon Rapids^{3}
- Copley Township
- Corcoran^{1}
- Cordova Township
- Cornish Township, Aitkin County
- Cornish Township, Sibley County
- Correll
- Cosmos^{2}
- Cosmos Township
- Cottage Grove
- Cottonwood
- Cottonwood Township
- Courtland
- Courtland Township
- Crane Lake Township^{1}
- Crate Township
- Credit River Township
- Croke Township
- Cromwell
- Crooked Lake Township
- Crookston
- Crookston Township^{1}
- Crosby
- Crosslake
- Crow Lake Township
- Crow River Township
- Crystal^{3}
- Crystal Bay Township
- Culver Township
- Currie
- Cushing Township
- Cuyuna
- Cyrus
- Dahlgren Township
- Dakota^{1}
- Dalbo Township
- Dale Township
- Dalton
- Dane Prairie Township
- Danielson Township
- Danube
- Danvers
- Danville Township
- Darfur
- Darwin
- Darwin Township^{2}
- Dassel
- Davis Township
- Dawson^{1}
- Dayton^{3}
- De Graff
- Decoria Township
- Deephaven
- Deer Creek
- Deer River
- Deer River Township
- Deer Township
- Deerfield Township, Cass County
- Deerwood
- Deerwood Township, Crow Wing County
- Deerwood Township, Kittson County
- Delano
- Delavan
- Delhi
- Dell Grove Township
- Dellwood
- Denham
- Denmark Township
- Dennison
- Dent
- Denver Township
- Detroit Lakes^{1}
- Dexter
- Dieter Township
- Dilworth
- Dodge Center
- Dollymount Township
- Donaldson^{1}
- Donnelly
- Donnelly Township, Marshall County
- Doran
- Dover
- Dovray
- Dovre Township^{2}
- Dresbach Township
- Dryden Township
- Dublin Township
- Dumont
- Dundas
- Dundee
- Dunn Township
- Dunnell
- Eagan
- Eagle Bend
- Eagle Lake
- Eagle Point Township
- Eagle Township
- Eagle View Township
- Eagles Nest Township^{1}
- East Bethel
- East Grand Forks^{2}
- East Gull Lake
- East Park Township
- East Side Township
- East Valley Township
- Easton
- Echo^{2}
- Eckvoll Township
- Eddy Township
- Eden Prairie
- Eden Valley
- Edgerton
- Edina
- Edison Township
- Effie
- Eidsvold Township
- Eitzen
- Elba
- Elbow Lake Township
- Elbow Lake
- Elgin
- Elizabeth
- Elk Lake Township
- Elk River^{3}
- Elko New Market
- Elkton
- Ellendale
- Ellsworth^{1}
- Elmdale
- Elmdale Township
- Elmore
- Elrosa
- Ely
- Elysian
- Embarrass Township
- Emily
- Emmons
- Enstrom Township
- Equality Township
- Erdahl Township
- Erhard
- Erskine
- Euclid Township
- Evan
- Evansville
- Eveleth
- Evergreen Township
- Excel Township
- Excelsior
- Eyota
- Fairfax
- Fairfield Township, Swift County
- Fairmont
- Fairview Township, Cass County
- Fairview Township, Lyon County
- Falk Township
- Farden Township
- Faribault
- Farmington^{2}
- Farwell
- Faxon Township^{1}
- Fayal Township
- Federal Dam
- Feeley Township^{1}
- Felton
- Fergus Falls
- Fertile
- Fifty Lakes
- Finlayson
- Fisher
- Fisher Township
- Flensburg^{1}
- Floodwood
- Florence^{1}
- Folden Township^{1}
- Foley
- Folsom Township
- Forada
- Ford Township
- Forest Lake
- Forest Township, Becker County
- Foreston
- Fork Township
- Fort Ripley^{1}
- Fosston
- Foster Township, Big Stone County
- Fountain
- Foxhome
- Foxhome Township
- Framnas Township
- Frankford Township
- Franklin^{1}
- Frazee
- Fredenberg Township
- Freeborn
- Freeland Township
- Freeport
- Fridley
- Frost
- Fulda
- Funkley
- Gail Lake Township^{1}
- Garden City Township
- Garfield
- Garrison
- Garrison Township
- Garvin
- Gary
- Gaylord
- Gem Lake
- Geneva^{1}
- Geneva Township
- Genola
- Georgetown
- Germania Township^{1}
- Germantown Township
- Ghent
- Gibbon
- Gilbert
- Gilman^{1}
- Glen Township
- Glencoe
- Glencoe Township
- Glenville
- Glenwood
- Glyndon
- Gonvick
- Good Hope Township, Itasca County
- Good Thunder
- Goodhue
- Goodridge
- Goodview
- Gould Township^{1}
- Graceville^{1}
- Graceville Township
- Grafton Township^{1}
- Graham Lakes Township
- Granada
- Granby Township
- Grand Lake Township
- Grand Marais
- Grand Meadow
- Grand Meadow Township
- Grand Plain Township
- Grand Rapids
- Grandview Township
- Granite Falls
- Grant
- Granville Township
- Grasston
- Grattan Township
- Gray Township
- Great Bend Township
- Green Isle
- Greenbush
- Greenfield^{1}
- Greenfield Township
- Greenwald
- Greenway Township^{1}
- Greenwood
- Greenwood Township, Clearwater County
- Gregory Township
- Grey Cloud Island Township
- Grey Eagle
- Grey Eagle Township
- Grimstad Township
- Grove City
- Grove Park-Tilden Township
- Grygla
- Gully
- Guthrie Township^{1}
- Hackensack
- Hadley
- Hallock
- Hallock Township
- Halma
- Halstad^{1, 2}
- Ham Lake
- Hamburg
- Hammond
- Hampden Township
- Hampton
- Hancock
- Hancock Township
- Hangaard Township
- Hanley Falls
- Hanover
- Hanska
- Hantho Township
- Harding^{1}
- Hardwick
- Harmony
- Harris
- Harris Township
- Hartland^{1}
- Hartland Township
- Harvey Township
- Hastings^{3}
- Hatfield
- Haugen Township^{2}
- Haven Township
- Hawley^{1}
- Hayfield^{1}
- Hayward
- Hayward Township
- Hazel Run
- Hazelton Township, Kittson County
- Hector
- Hector Township
- Hegbert Township
- Heidelberg
- Helen Township
- Helena Township
- Helga Township^{2}
- Helgeland Township
- Henderson
- Henderson Township
- Hendricks
- Hendrickson Township
- Hendrum
- Henning
- Henrietta Township
- Henriette
- Hereim Township
- Herman
- Hermantown
- Heron Lake
- Heron Lake Township
- Hewitt
- Hibbing^{3}
- Hickory Township
- Higdem Township
- Highwater Township
- Hill City^{1}
- Hill Township^{1}
- Hillman
- Hillman Township, Kanabec County
- Hillman Township, Morrison County
- Hills
- Hilltop^{1}
- Hinckley^{1}
- Hines Township
- Hiram Township
- Hitterdal
- Hoffman
- Hokah^{1}
- Holden Township
- Holdingford
- Holland
- Hollandale
- Holloway
- Holly Township
- Hollywood Township
- Holst Township
- Holt^{2}
- Holyoke Township
- Home Brook Township^{1}
- Honner Township
- Hope Township
- Horton Township
- Houston
- Howard Lake
- Hoyt Lakes^{1}
- Hubbard Township, Hubbard County
- Hubbard Township, Polk County
- Hugo
- Humboldt
- Hunter Township
- Huntly Township
- Huss Township
- Hutchinson^{3}
- Hyde Park Township
- Ihlen
- Industrial Township
- Inguadona Township
- International Falls^{2}
- Inver Grove Heights^{3}
- Iona^{1}
- Iron Junction
- Irondale Township
- Ironton
- Isanti
- Isle
- Itasca Township
- Ivanhoe
- Jackson
- Jadis Township
- Jamestown Township
- Janesville
- Jasper
- Jeffers^{7}
- Jenkins
- Jenkins Township
- Jessenland Township^{1}
- Johnson
- Jones Township
- Jordan
- Judson Township
- Jupiter Township
- Kalevala Township
- Kandiyohi
- Karlstad
- Kasota^{1}
- Kasota Township
- Kasson
- Keewatin^{2}
- Kelliher
- Kellogg
- Kelso Township
- Kennedy
- Kenneth
- Kensington
- Kent
- Kenyon^{1}
- Kenyon Township
- Kerkhoven
- Kerkhoven Township
- Kerrick
- Kettle River^{1}
- Kiester
- Kiester Township^{1}
- Kildare Township
- Kilkenny
- Kimball
- Kinbrae
- Kinghurst Township
- Kingston
- Kinney^{1}
- Knute Township
- Kragero Township
- Kroschel Township
- Kugler Township
- La Crescent
- La Prairie^{1}
- La Prairie Township
- La Salle
- Lafayette
- Lafayette Township
- Lake Alice Township
- Lake Benton
- Lake Bronson
- Lake City
- Lake Crystal
- Lake Edward Township
- Lake Elmo
- Lake Emma Township
- Lake George Township, Hubbard County^{1}
- Lake George Township, Stearns County
- Lake Henry
- Lake Jessie Township
- Lake Lillian
- Lake Park^{1}
- Lake Pleasant Township
- Lake Prairie Township
- Lake St. Croix Beach
- Lake Shore
- Lake Shore Township
- Lake Valley Township
- Lake Wilson
- Lakefield
- Lakeland^{1}
- Lakeland Shores^{1}
- Lakeport Township^{1}
- Lakeside Township, Cottonwood County
- Laketown Township
- Lakeville
- Lamberton
- Lancaster
- Land Township
- Landfall
- Lanesboro
- Lanesburgh Township
- Laporte
- Lastrup
- Lauderdale
- Lawrence Township, Grant County
- Lawrence Township, Itasca County
- Le Center
- Le Roy
- Le Sauk Township
- Le Sueur
- Leech Lake Township
- Lengby
- Lent Township
- Leonard
- Leonardsville Township
- Leonidas
- Leslie Township
- Lester Prairie
- Lewiston
- Lewisville
- Lexington
- Lexington Township
- Libby Township
- Lien Township
- Lilydale
- Lima Township
- Lime Township
- Lincoln Township, Blue Earth County
- Lincoln Township, Marshall County
- Lind Township
- Linden Township^{1}
- Lindstrom^{1}
- Linsell Township
- Linwood Township
- Lismore
- Litchfield
- Little Canada
- Little Elbow Township
- Little Elk Township
- Little Falls
- Little Pine Township
- Littlefork
- Logan Township, Aitkin County
- London Township
- Long Beach
- Long Lake
- Long Lake Township, Crow Wing County
- Long Lake Township, Watonwan County
- Long Lost Lake Township
- Long Prairie^{1, 2}
- Longville
- Loon Lake Township
- Loretto
- Louisburg
- Louisville Township, Red Lake County
- Louisville Township, Scott County^{1}
- Lowry
- Lucan
- Luverne
- Lyle
- Lynd^{1}
- Lynd Township
- Lyra Township
- Mabel
- Macville Township
- Madelia
- Madison
- Madison Lake
- Magnolia^{1}
- Mahnomen
- Mahtowa Township
- Malta Township
- Manchester^{1}
- Manchester Township
- Manfred Township
- Manhattan Beach^{1, 2}
- Mankato
- Mankato Township
- Mansfield Township
- Mantorville
- Mantrap Township
- Maple Grove
- Maple Grove Township, Becker County
- Maple Lake
- Maple Plain
- Maple Township
- Mapleton
- Mapleton Township
- Mapleview
- Maplewood^{1, 3, 8}
- Marble
- Marcell Township
- Marietta
- Marine on St. Croix
- Marsh Creek Township
- Marsh Grove Township
- Marshall
- Marshfield Township
- Martin Township^{2}
- Marysland Township
- Mason Township
- Max Township
- Maxwell Township
- May Township, Cass County^{1}
- Mayer
- Maynard
- Mazeppa
- McCrea Township
- McGrath
- McGregor
- McIntosh
- McKinley
- McKinley Township
- McPherson Township
- Meadow Brook Township^{1}
- Meadowlands
- Medford
- Medicine Lake^{1}
- Medina
- Medo Township
- Meire Grove
- Melrose
- Menahga
- Mendota
- Mendota Heights
- Mentor
- Middle River
- Middle River Township
- Midway Township, Cottonwood County
- Miesville
- Milaca
- Milan
- Millerville
- Millville
- Millward Township
- Milroy
- Miltona
- Miltona Township
- Minneapolis^{2, 4, 6}
- Minneiska
- Minneiska Township
- Minneota
- Minnesota City
- Minnesota Lake
- Minnetonka^{2, 6}
- Minnetonka Beach
- Minnetrista
- Mission Township^{1}
- Mizpah
- Moltke Township
- Monroe Township
- Monson Township
- Montevideo
- Montgomery
- Monticello
- Montrose
- Moonshine Township
- Moore Township
- Moorhead
- Moose Creek Township
- Moose Lake
- Moose Lake Township, Carlton County
- Moose Lake Township, Cass County
- Moose Township
- Mora
- Morgan
- Morrill Township
- Morris
- Morristown^{1}
- Morse Township, Itasca County
- Morton^{1}
- Motley
- Mound
- Mounds View
- Mount Morris Township
- Mountain Iron^{3}
- Mountain Lake
- Mountain Lake Township
- Moyer Township^{1}
- Mudgett Township
- Mulligan Township
- Murdock
- Myrtle
- Nashua
- Nashwauk
- Nashwauk Township
- Nassau
- Nelson
- Nelson Park Township
- Nerstrand
- Nesbit Township
- Ness Township
- Nessel Township
- Nevis
- Nevis Township
- New Auburn^{1}
- New Auburn Township
- New Brighton
- New Folden Township
- New Germany^{1}
- New Hope^{3}
- New Independence Township
- New London
- New Maine Township
- New Market Township^{2}
- New Munich
- New Prague
- New Richland^{1}
- New Solum Township
- New Sweden Township
- New Trier
- New Ulm^{3}
- New York Mills^{1}
- Newfolden
- Newport
- Newry Township
- Newton Township
- Nicollet
- Nicollet Township
- Nielsville
- Nimrod
- Nisswa
- Nokay Lake Township
- Nora Township, Clearwater County
- Norcross
- Nordland Township, Aitkin County
- Nordland Township, Lyon County
- Nore Township
- North Branch
- North Fork Township
- North Mankato
- North Oaks^{1}
- North Ottawa Township
- North St. Paul
- North Star Township, Brown County^{1}
- Northern Township^{1}
- Northfield^{3}
- Northome^{1}
- Northrop
- Norway Township, Kittson County
- Norwood Young America
- Nowthen
- Numedal Township
- Nunda Township
- Oak Grove
- Oak Lawn Township
- Oak Park Heights
- Oak Park Township
- Oakdale
- Oakwood Township
- Odessa
- Odessa Township
- Odin
- Odin Township
- Ogema
- Ogilvie^{1}
- Okabena
- Oklee
- Olivia
- Onamia
- Ormsby
- Orono
- Oronoco
- Orr
- Orrock Township
- Ortonville
- Ortonville Township
- Osakis
- Osborne Township
- Oscar Township
- Oshawa Township
- Oslo
- Osseo
- Ostrander
- Oteneagen Township
- Otrey Township
- Otsego
- Ottawa Township
- Otter Tail Peninsula Township
- Ottertail
- Owatonna
- Owens Township
- Oxford Township
- Palisade
- Palmville Township
- Park Rapids
- Parker Township, Marshall County
- Parkers Prairie
- Parnell Township, Traverse County
- Paynesville
- Paynesville Township
- Pease
- Pelan Township
- Pelican Lake Township^{1}
- Pelican Rapids
- Pelican Township, Crow Wing County
- Pelican Township, Otter Tail County
- Pemberton
- Pennock
- Pequot Lakes
- Perch Lake Township
- Percy Township
- Perham
- Perham Township
- Perley
- Perry Lake Township
- Peterson
- Pierz
- Pierz Township
- Pike Bay Township
- Pike Township
- Pillager
- Pillsbury Township
- Pine City
- Pine City Township
- Pine Island
- Pine Lake Township, Cass County
- Pine River
- Pine River Township
- Pine Springs
- Pipestone
- Plainview^{1}
- Plato
- Platte Lake Township
- Pleasant Mound Township
- Pliny Township
- Plummer
- Plymouth
- Pohlitz Township
- Polk Centre Township
- Polonia Township
- Pomme de Terre Township
- Pomroy Township, Itasca County
- Ponto Lake Township
- Poplar Township
- Popple Township
- Poppleton Township
- Portage Township
- Porter
- Posen Township
- Powers Township
- Prairie Lake Township
- Preston
- Princeton^{2}
- Prinsburg
- Prior Lake^{1}
- Prior Township
- Proctor
- Pulaski Township
- Quamba
- Racine
- Ramsey
- Randall^{1}
- Randolph
- Ranier
- Raymond
- Red Lake Falls
- Red Lake Falls Township
- Red Wing^{3}
- Redpath Township
- Redwood Falls
- Regal
- Reine Township
- Remer
- Remer Township
- Renville
- Revere
- Rice^{1}
- Rice Lake
- Rice Township
- Rich Valley Township^{1}
- Richardson Township^{1}
- Richardville Township
- Richfield^{3}
- Richmond
- Richville
- Ridgely Township
- River Falls Township
- River Township
- Riverdale Township
- Riverton
- Robbinsdale^{3}
- Rochester^{2, 3}
- Rock Creek
- Rock Lake Township^{1}
- Rockford
- Rockville
- Rockwood Township, Hubbard County
- Rogers
- Rogers Township^{2}
- Rollingstone
- Rollis Township
- Roome Township
- Roosevelt
- Roscoe
- Rose Creek
- Rose Dell Township
- Roseau
- Rosemount
- Rosendale Township
- Roseville^{3}
- Roseville Township, Grant County
- Rosing Township
- Ross Lake Township
- Ross Township
- Rothsay
- Round Lake
- Round Lake Township, Becker County
- Royalton
- Rush City
- Rush Lake Township
- Rushford Village
- Rushmore
- Russell
- Ruthton
- Rutledge
- Sabin
- Sago Township
- St. Anthony
- St. Augusta
- St. Bonifacius^{1}
- St. Charles
- St. Clair
- St. Cloud^{3}
- St. Francis
- St. Hilaire
- St. James
- St. James Township
- St. Joseph
- St. Joseph Township, Kittson County
- St. Lawrence Township
- St. Leo
- St. Martin
- St. Marys Point
- St. Mathias Township
- St. Michael
- St. Rosa
- St. Stephen
- St. Vincent
- St. Vincent Township
- Salem Township, Cass County
- San Francisco Township
- Sanborn
- Sand Creek Township
- Sand Lake Township
- Sandstone^{1}
- Sanford Township
- Sargeant
- Sargeant Township
- Sartell
- Sauk Centre
- Sauk Rapids
- Savage
- Scandia
- Scandia Valley Township
- Scanlon
- Schoolcraft Township
- Seaforth
- Sebeka
- Sedan^{1}
- Severance Township
- Seward Township
- Shafer
- Shakopee^{2}
- Sharon Township
- Shelburne Township
- Shelby Township
- Shell Rock Township
- Shelly
- Sherburn
- Sheridan Township^{1}
- Shevlin
- Shevlin Township
- Shible Township
- Shingobee Township
- Shoreview
- Shorewood
- Sibley Township
- Sigel Township
- Silver Bay
- Silver Brook Township
- Silver Creek Township, Wright County
- Silver Lake
- Silver Township
- Sinclair Township
- Sinnott Township
- Six Mile Grove Township
- Skagen Township
- Skane Township
- Skelton Township
- Skyline
- Slater Township
- Slayton^{1}
- Sleepy Eye
- Smoky Hollow Township
- Sobieski
- Sodus Township
- Solway
- South Bend Township
- South Branch Township
- South Haven^{1}
- South Red River Township
- South St. Paul
- Southbrook Township
- Southside Township
- Spang Township
- Spicer
- Split Rock Township
- Splithand Township
- Spring Brook Township^{1}
- Spring Grove
- Spring Hill
- Spring Lake Park^{1}
- Spring Lake Township
- Spring Park
- Spring Valley
- Springfield
- Springfield Township
- Springvale Township^{1}
- Spruce Township
- Spruce Valley Township
- Squaw Lake
- Stacy^{1}
- Stafford Township
- Stanchfield Township
- Staples
- Starbuck
- Stately Township
- Steamboat River Township
- Steen
- Stephen
- Sterling Township
- Stevens Township
- Stewart
- Stewartville
- Stillwater
- Stillwater Township
- Stockton
- Stokes Township, Itasca County^{1}
- Stokes Township, Roseau County
- Stony Brook Township
- Storden
- Storden Township
- Strandquist
- Strathcona
- Sturgeon Lake
- Sturgeon Lake Township
- Sumter Township
- Sunburg
- Sunfish Lake
- Svea Township
- Swanville
- Sylvan Township
- Taconite
- Tamarac Township
- Tamarack
- Taopi
- Tara Township, Traverse County
- Taunton
- Taylor Township, Traverse County
- Taylors Falls
- Tegner Township
- Teien Township
- Tenstrike^{1}
- Thief Lake Township
- Thief River Falls
- Third River Township
- Thompson Township
- Thomson Township
- Thorpe Township
- Thunder Lake Township
- Timothy Township^{1}
- Tintah
- Tintah Township
- Todd Township
- Tonka Bay
- Toqua Township
- Torrey Township
- Tower^{1}
- Tracy^{1}
- Trail
- Transit Township
- Traverse Township
- Trelipe Township
- Trimont^{1}
- Trommald^{1}
- Trondhjem Township
- Trosky^{1}
- Trout Lake Township
- Troy Township, Renville County
- Truman
- Turtle Lake Township, Cass County
- Turtle River
- Twin Lakes
- Twin Lakes Township, Carlton County
- Twin Lakes Township, Mahnomen County
- Twin Valley
- Two Harbors
- Tyler
- Ulen
- Underwood
- Underwood Township
- Upsala
- Urbank^{1}
- Utica
- Vadnais Heights
- Valley Township
- Vega Township
- Veldt Township
- Verdon Township
- Vergas
- Vermillion
- Verndale
- Vernon Center
- Vernon Center Township
- Verona Township^{2}
- Vesta^{2}
- Vesta Township
- Victoria
- Vienna Township
- Viking
- Viking Township
- Villard
- Villard Township
- Vining
- Virginia
- Waasa Township
- Wabana Township
- Wabasha
- Wabasso
- Wabedo Township
- Waconia^{1}
- Waconia Township
- Wadena
- Wagner Township
- Wahkon^{1}
- Waite Park^{2}
- Walden Township, Cass County^{1, 2}
- Waldorf
- Walker
- Walls Township
- Walnut Grove^{1}
- Walters
- Waltham
- Wanamingo
- Wanda
- Wanger Township
- Warba
- Ward Township
- Warren
- Warrenton Township
- Warroad
- Waseca^{1}
- Washington Lake Township
- Washington Township
- Watertown
- Watertown Township
- Waterville
- Watkins
- Watson
- Waubun
- Waukenabo Township
- Waverly
- Wawina Township^{1}
- Wayzata
- Welcome
- Wells
- Wendell^{1}
- West Concord
- West Newton Township
- West St. Paul^{3}
- West Union^{1}
- West Valley Township
- Westbrook
- Westbrook Township^{1}
- Westerheim Township
- Westport
- Whalan
- Wheaton
- White Bear Township
- White Oak Township
- White Township
- Whiteford Township
- Whitewater Township
- Wilder
- Wildwood Township
- Wilkinson Township
- Willernie^{1}
- Williams
- Williams Township
- Willmar^{3}
- Willow River
- Willow Valley Township
- Wilmont
- Wilson Township, Cass County
- Wilton
- Windemere Township^{1}
- Windom
- Windsor Township
- Winfield Township
- Winger
- Winnebago
- Winona^{3}
- Winsor Township
- Winsted
- Winsted Township^{1}
- Winthrop^{1}
- Winton
- Wirt Township
- Wolf Lake
- Wolford Township
- Wolverton
- Wood Lake
- Wood Lake Township
- Woodbury
- Woodland
- Woodrow Township, Cass County
- Woodstock
- Woodville Township
- Workman Township
- Worthington
- Worthington Township
- Wrenshall^{1}
- Wrenshall Township
- Wright^{1}
- Wright Township
- Wykoff
- Wylie Township
- Wyoming
- Yellow Bank Township
- Young America Township
- Zemple
- Zimmerman
- Zumbro Falls
- Zumbro Township^{1}
- Zumbrota
- ^{1}One or more special elections will be held on the day of the general election.
- ^{2}Will have one or more ballot questions on the day of the general election.
- ^{3}A primary election was held.
- ^{4}A special election was held on the day of the primary election.
- ^{5}A special primary election will be held on the day of the general election.
- ^{6}Does not have regularly scheduled elections.
- ^{7}Had a ballot question on the day of the primary election.
- ^{8}Two special primary elections were held on the day of the primary election.

=== School districts ===
294 school districts held regular elections to elect half of the members of their board of directors. Minneapolis and Red Lake each held a primary election. Barnesville, Duluth, Fridley, Orono, Prinsburg, Rush City, and Saint Paul did not have regularly scheduled elections, but each held a special election or had one or more ballot questions on the day of the general election. 28 other school districts also held a special election on the day of the general election. Ely, Gibbon-Fairfax-Winthrop, and McGregor each had one or more ballot questions on the day of the primary election. 43 school districts had one or more ballot questions on the day of the general election.

List of school districts holding elections
- Ada-Borup
- Adrian
- Aitkin^{1}
- Albany
- Albert Lea^{1}
- Alden-Conger
- Alexandria
- Annandale
- Ashby
- Atwater-Cosmos-Grove City
- Austin^{1, 2}
- Badger^{1}
- Bagley
- Barnesville^{2, 3}
- Barnum
- Battle Lake^{1, 2}
- Becker
- Belgrade-Brooten-Elrosa
- Belle Plaine
- Bemidji^{1}
- Benson
- Bertha-Hewitt
- Big Lake
- Blackduck
- Blooming Prairie
- Blue Earth Area^{1}
- BOLD
- Braham
- Brainerd
- Brandon-Evansville
- Breckenridge
- Brooklyn Center
- Browerville
- Browns Valley
- Buffalo Lake-Hector-Stewart
- Buffalo-Hanover-Montrose
- Burnsville
- Butterfield^{1}
- Byron
- Caledonia
- Cambridge-Isanti^{1}
- Campbell-Tintah
- Canby
- Cannon Falls
- Carlton
- Cass Lake-Bena
- Cedar Mountain
- Centennial
- Chatfield
- Chisago Lakes
- Chisholm
- Chokio-Alberta
- Clearbrook-Gonvick^{2}
- Cleveland^{1}
- Climax-Shelly^{2}
- Clinton-Graceville-Beardsley
- Cloquet
- Columbia Heights
- Comfrey
- Cook County
- Cromwell-Wright
- Crookston
- Crosby-Ironton
- Dassel-Cokato
- Dawson-Boyd
- Deer River
- Delano^{2}
- Detroit Lakes
- Dilworth-Glyndon-Felton
- Dover-Eyota
- Duluth^{2, 3}
- East Grand Forks
- Eastern Carver County
- Eden Prairie
- Eden Valley-Watkins
- Edgerton
- Elk River
- Ellsworth^{2}
- Ely^{4}
- Esko
- Fairmont Area
- Faribault
- Farmington
- Fergus Falls
- Fertile-Beltrami
- Fillmore Central^{1}
- Fisher
- Floodwood^{1, 2}
- Foley
- Forest Lake
- Fosston^{2}
- Frazee-Vergas
- Fridley^{1, 2, 3}
- Fulda
- Gibbon-Fairfax-Winthrop^{2, 4}
- Glencoe-Silver Lake
- Glenville-Emmons
- Goodhue
- Goodridge
- Granada Huntley East Chain
- Grand Meadow
- Grand Rapids
- Greenbush-Middle River^{1}
- Greenway
- Grygla
- Hancock
- Hawley
- Hayfield
- Hendricks
- Henning^{1}
- Herman-Norcross
- Hermantown
- Heron Lake-Okabena
- Hibbing
- Hill City
- Hills-Beaver Creek
- Houston^{2}
- Howard Lake-Waverly-Winsted^{1}
- Hutchinson^{2}
- International Falls
- Isle^{2}
- Ivanhoe
- Jackson County Central
- Janesville-Waldorf-Pemberton
- Jordan
- Kasson-Mantorville
- Kelliher
- Kenyon-Wanamingo^{1}
- Kerkhoven-Murdock-Sunburg
- Kimball
- Kingsland
- Kittson Central
- La Crescent-Hokah
- Lac qui Parle Valley
- Lake Benton
- Lake City
- Lake Crystal-Wellcome Memorial
- Lake of the Woods^{2}
- Lake Park Audubon
- Lake Superior
- Lakeview^{2}
- Lakeville
- Lancaster^{1}
- Lanesboro
- Laporte^{1, 2}
- Le Sueur-Henderson
- LeRoy-Ostrander
- Lester Prairie
- Lewiston-Altura
- Litchfield
- Little Falls
- Littlefork-Big Falls
- Long Prairie-Grey Eagle
- Luverne
- Lyle
- Lynd
- Mabel-Canton^{1}
- MACCRAY
- Madelia
- Mahnomen
- Mahtomedi
- Mankato
- Maple Lake^{2}
- Maple River
- Marshall
- Marshall County Central^{1}
- Martin County West
- McGregor^{4}
- Medford
- Melrose
- Menahga^{1}
- Mesabi East
- Milaca
- Milroy^{1}
- Minneapolis^{5}
- Minneota
- Minnewaska
- Montevideo^{1}
- Monticello^{1}
- Moorhead
- Moose Lake
- Mora
- Morris Area^{1, 2}
- Mountain Iron-Buhl
- Murray County Central
- N.R.H.E.G.^{1, 2}
- Nashwauk-Keewatin^{1}
- Nett Lake
- Nevis
- New London-Spicer^{1}
- New Prague Area
- New Ulm
- New York Mills
- Nicollet
- Norman County East
- Norman County West
- North Branch
- North St. Paul-Maplewood
- Northfield
- Northland Community
- Onamia
- Orono^{1, 3}
- Ortonville
- Osakis
- Osseo^{2}
- Owatonna^{1}
- Park Rapids^{1}
- Parkers Prairie
- Paynesville
- Pelican Rapids
- Pequot Lakes
- Perham-Dent^{2}
- Pierz
- Pillager
- Pine City^{1}
- Pine Island^{2}
- Pine River-Backus
- Pipestone Area
- Plainview-Elgin-Millville
- Princeton
- Prinsburg^{1, 3}
- Prior Lake
- Proctor
- Randolph
- Red Lake^{1, 5}
- Red Lake County Central
- Red Lake Falls
- Red Rock Central^{1, 2}
- Red Wing
- Redwood Area^{2}
- Renville County West
- Robbinsdale
- Rochester
- Rock Ridge
- Rockford
- Rocori
- Roseau
- Round Lake-Brewster
- Royalton
- Rush City^{2, 3}
- Rushford-Peterson
- Russell-Tyler-Ruthton
- St. Charles
- St. Clair
- St. Cloud Area
- St. Francis Area
- St. James^{1}
- St. Louis County
- St. Michael-Albertville
- Saint Paul^{2, 3}
- Sartell-St. Stephen
- Sauk Centre
- Sauk Rapids-Rice
- Sebeka^{2}
- Shakopee^{1}
- Sibley East
- Sleepy Eye
- South Koochiching
- South St. Paul
- Southland
- Spring Grove
- Springfield
- Staples-Motley
- Stephen-Argyle Central
- Stewartville
- Stillwater^{2}
- Swanville
- Thief River Falls
- Tracy Area
- Tri-City United
- Tri-County
- Triton
- Truman
- Ulen-Hitterdal^{1, 2}
- Underwood
- United South Central^{1}
- Upsala
- Verndale^{2}
- Wabasha-Kellogg
- Wabasso
- Waconia^{1}
- Wadena-Deer Creek
- Walker-Hackensack-Akeley
- Warren-Alvarado-Oslo
- Warroad
- Waseca
- Watertown-Mayer
- Waterville-Elysian-Morristown
- Waubun-Ogema-White Earth
- West Central Area^{1}
- Westbrook-Walnut Grove
- Wheaton Area^{1}
- Willmar
- Willow River
- Windom
- Win-E-Mac^{2}
- Winona Area
- Worthington
- Wrenshall
- Yellow Medicine East
- Zumbrota-Mazeppa
- ^{1}Will have one or more ballot questions on the day of the general election.
- ^{2}A special election will be held on the day of the general election.
- ^{3}Does not have a regularly scheduled election.
- ^{4}Had one or more ballot questions on the day of the primary election.
- ^{5}A primary election was held.

=== Hospital districts ===
14 hospital districts held regular elections to elect half of the members of their board of directors. Two hospital districts also held special elections on the day of the general election.

List of hospital districts holding elections
- Canby Community
- Cook County
- Cook-Orr
- Cuyuna Range
- Dawson Area
- Glacial Ridge
- Monticello-Big Lake Community
- North Pine Area^{1}
- Northern Itasca^{1}
- Paynesville Area
- Pelican Valley
- Perham
- Staples Area
- United
- ^{1}Several special elections will be held on the day of the general election.
