= Red River Township =

Red River Township may refer to the following townships in the United States:

- Red River Township, Searcy County, Arkansas
- North Red River Township, Kittson County, Minnesota
- South Red River Township, Kittson County, Minnesota
