= Hazelton Township, Minnesota =

Hazelton Township is the name of some places in the U.S. state of Minnesota:

- Hazelton Township, Aitkin County, Minnesota
- Hazelton Township, Kittson County, Minnesota

== See also ==
- Hazelton Township (disambiguation)
