= Pelan =

Pelan or Pellan can refer to:

== People ==
- John Pelan (1957–2021), American author, editor and publisher
- Alfred Pellan, (1906–1988), Canadian painter

== Locations ==
- Pelan Township, Kittson County, Minnesota, settled in 1880 by Charles Pelan from England
- Pelan, Minnesota, ghost town in Kittson County, Minnesota
- Alfred-Pellan, federal electoral district in Quebec, Canada
- Pelan, the name of the island of Patmos according to Nation of Islam
