= Orleans, Minnesota =

Unincorporated community in Minnesota, United States

Orleans
- Unincorporated community
- Location within Minnesota Location within the United States
- Coordinates: 48°55′34″N 96°56′12″W
- Country: United States
- State: Minnesota
- County: Kittson County
- Township: Clow
- Elevation: 837 ft (255 m)
- Time zone: UTC-6 (Central (CST))
  - Summer (DST): UTC-5 (CDT)
- ZIP code: 56735
- Area code: 218
- GNIS feature ID: 648994

Orleans (/ɔːrˈliːnz/ or-LEENZ) is an unincorporated community in Clow Township, Kittson County, Minnesota, United States. The community is located near the junction of Kittson County Roads 1, 6, and 55. Nearby places include Humboldt, Lancaster, and Hallock. The Little Joe River flows nearby. 363rd Street and County Road 8 are also in the immediate area.

A post office called Orleans was established in 1904, and remained in operation until 1984. According to Warren Upham, the community was named directly or indirectly after Orléans, in France.
