= Northcote, Minnesota =

Unincorporated community in Minnesota, United States

Northcote
- Unincorporated community
- Location within Minnesota Location within the United States
- Coordinates: 48°50′43″N 97°00′04″W
- Country: United States
- State: Minnesota
- County: Kittson County
- Township: Hampden
- Elevation: 804 ft (245 m)
- Time zone: UTC-6 (Central (CST))
  - Summer (DST): UTC-5 (CDT)
- ZIP code: 56728
- Area code: 218
- GNIS feature ID: 648713

Northcote (/ˈnɔːrθkoʊt/ NORTH-koht) is an unincorporated community in Hampden Township, Kittson County, Minnesota, United States.

The community is located along U.S. Highway 75 near Kittson County Road 4. Nearby places include Hallock and Lancaster. The North Branch of Two Rivers flows nearby.

It was founded as a center of commerce for the surrounding farms and has slowly dwindled in population over the years. There are no records that the settlement was ever incorporated into a village. The settlement was in the heart of a great farming area.

Jeff and Annette Homstad are the only remaining current residents of Northcote Mn.

A post office called Northcote was established in 1881, and remained in operation until 1974. The community was named for Stafford Henry Northcote, 1st Earl of Iddesleigh (1818-1887), a British politician.
