= Arveson =

Arveson may refer to:

- Arveson Township, Kittson County, Minnesota, United States
- William Arveson (1934–2011), American mathematician
