= Spring Brook Township =

Spring Brook Township may refer to the following townships in the United States:

- Spring Brook Township, Kittson County, Minnesota
- Spring Brook Township, Pennsylvania
