= Hallock Township =

Hallock Township may refer to the following townships in the United States:

- Hallock Township, Kittson County, Minnesota
- Hallock Township, Peoria County, Illinois
