= East Kittson, Minnesota =

Unorganized territory of Kittson County, Minnesota, United States

Coordinates: 48°49′13″N 96°28′14″W

East Kittson is an unorganized territory in Kittson County, Minnesota, United States, named after fur trader and railroad entrepreneur Norman Kittson. The population was 13 at the 2000 census.

== Geography ==
According to the United States Census Bureau, the unorganized territory has a total area of 72.7 square miles (188.2 km^{2}), of which 72.3 square miles (187.3 km^{2}) is land and 0.3 square mile (0.9 km^{2}) (0.48%) is water.

== Demographics ==
As of the census of 2000, there were 13 people, 5 households, and 3 families residing in the unorganized territory. The population density was 0.2 inhabitants per square mile (0.077/km^{2}). There were 16 housing units at an average density of 0.2 per square mile (0.077/km^{2}). The racial makeup of the unorganized territory was 100.00% White.

There were 5 households, out of which 20.0% had children under the age of 18 living with them, 40.0% were married couples living together, 20.0% had a female householder with no husband present, and 40.0% were non-families. 40.0% of all households were made up of individuals, and none had someone living alone who was 65 years of age or older. The average household size was 2.60 and the average family size was 3.67.

In the unorganized territory the population was spread out, with 38.5% under the age of 18, 7.7% from 18 to 24, 30.8% from 25 to 44, 23.1% from 45 to 64. The median age was 26 years. For every 100 females, there were 44.4 males. For every 100 females age 18 and over, there were 60.0 males.

The median income for a household in the unorganized territory was $26,250, and the median income for a family was $27,083. Males had a median income of $23,750 versus $17,500 for females. The per capita income for the unorganized territory was $7,690. None of the population or the families were below the poverty line.
