= Hazelton Township =

Hazelton Township may refer to the following places in the United States:

- Hazelton Township, Barber County, Kansas
- Hazelton Township, Shiawassee County, Michigan
- Hazelton Township, Aitkin County, Minnesota
- Hazelton Township, Kittson County, Minnesota
- Hazelton Township, Emmons County, North Dakota
