= Splithand Township, Itasca County, Minnesota =

Splithand Township, Minnesota
- Township
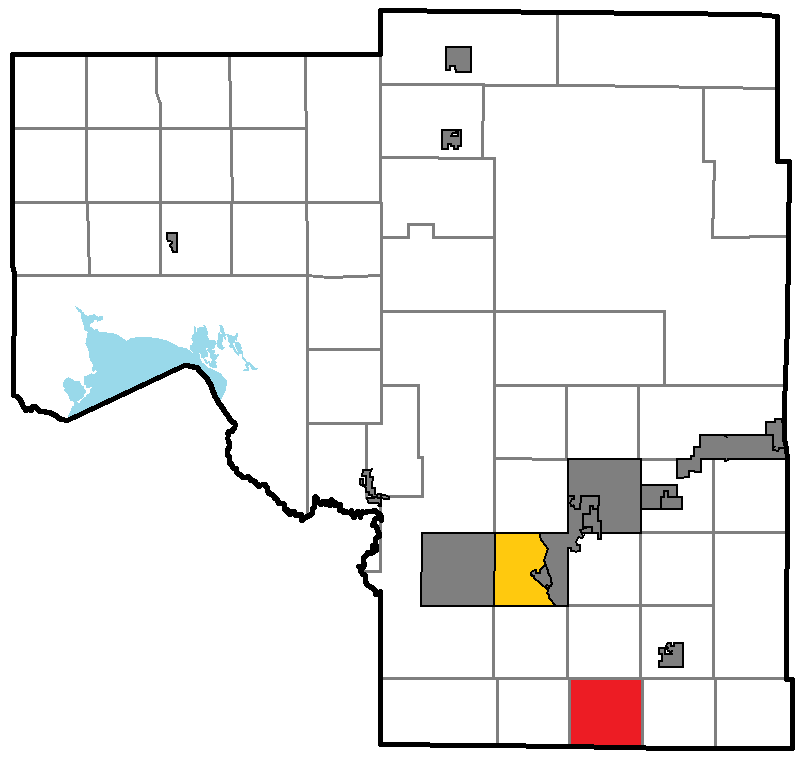
- Location of Splithand Township, within Itasca County, Minnesota
- Coordinates: 47°3′43″N 93°23′57″W
- Country: United States
- State: Minnesota
- County: Itasca

Area
  - Total: 33.4 sq mi (86.4 km^{2})
  - Land: 32.6 sq mi (84.4 km^{2})
  - Water: 0.73 sq mi (1.9 km^{2})
- Elevation: 1,240 ft (378 m)

Population (2020)
  - Total: 227
  - Density: 6.97/sq mi (2.69/km^{2})
- Time zone: UTC-6 (Central (CST))
  - Summer (DST): UTC-5 (CDT)
- FIPS code: 27-61700
- GNIS feature ID: 0665664

Splithand Township is a township in Itasca County, Minnesota, United States. The population was 227 at the 2020 census.

Splithand Township took its name from Split Hand Creek.

== Geography ==
According to the United States Census Bureau, the township has a total area of 33.3 square miles (86.4 km^{2}), of which 32.6 square miles (84.4 km^{2}) is land and 0.8 square miles (1.9 km^{2}), or 2.25%, is water.

== Demographics ==
As of the census of 2000, there were 256 people, 98 households, and 76 families living in the township. The population density was 7.9 people per square mile (3.0/km^{2}). There were 120 housing units at an average density of 3.7/sq mi (1.4/km^{2}). The racial makeup of the township was 98.05% White, 0.78% from other races, and 1.17% from two or more races. Hispanic or Latino of any race were 0.39% of the population.

There were 98 households, out of which 26.5% had children under the age of 18 living with them, 68.4% were married couples living together, 4.1% had a female householder with no husband present, and 22.4% were non-families. 17.3% of all households were made up of individuals, and 9.2% had someone living alone who was 65 years of age or older. The average household size was 2.61 and the average family size was 2.96.

In the township the population was spread out, with 23.8% under the age of 18, 6.6% from 18 to 24, 30.1% from 25 to 44, 24.6% from 45 to 64, and 14.8% who were 65 years of age or older. The median age was 40 years. For every 100 females, there were 109.8 males. For every 100 females age 18 and over, there were 121.6 males.

The median income for a household in the township was $37,292, and the median income for a family was $40,625. Males had a median income of $31,339 versus $23,750 for females. The per capita income for the township was $15,904. About 4.8% of families and 8.1% of the population were below the poverty line, including 4.2% of those under the age of eighteen and 12.9% of those 65 or over.
