= Pelan, Minnesota =

Ghost town in Minnesota in United States

Coordinates: 48°38′37″N 96°23′36″W

Pelan is an abandoned townsite in Kittson County, Minnesota, United States. It lies in Pelan Township, between the cities of Karlstad and Greenbush.

== History ==
Settlement began in 1880. The site was named for Charles Pelan, a wealthy Englishman. The town had a post office from 1888 until 1912. In 1889 the first postmaster, Frederic W. (Billy) Clay, disappeared with a sack of mail and was never found. The town was incorporated in 1903 but ceased in 1909. The post office was moved to Roseau County until service ended in 1917. Pelan Park stands where the town was. It consists of a church, cemetery and a few buildings. The Western Wood-Pewee, a species of bird, has been recorded nesting in this wooded park.
