= Maury Finney =

American songwriter

- Origin: Humboldt, Minnesota, U.S.
- Genres: Country
- Occupation: Musician
- Instrument: Saxophone
- Years active: 1976–1980
- Label: Soundwaves

Maury Finney (born in Humboldt, Minnesota) is an American country music saxophonist. Between 1976 and 1980, he recorded for the Soundwaves record label. Finney charted twelve times on the Billboard country singles charts. His highest-peaking single was "Coconut Grove," which reached No. 72 in 1977.

== Musical career ==
In the 1970s, Finney owned an appliance store in East Grand Forks, Minnesota. He also played in a band called The Charms, which had regional success, before recording his debut single "Maiden's Prayer" for the Soundwaves label.

Finney's recordings for Soundwaves largely comprised instrumental covers of other artists' songs. Among these were David Houston's "Almost Persuaded," Larry Gatlin's "I Don't Wanna Cry," Hank Thompson's "The Wild Side of Life" and Ernest Tubb's "Waltz Across Texas." The singles "Maiden's Prayer," "Coconut Grove" and "I Want to Play My Horn on the Grand Ole Opry" all featured vocals from a backing chorus, and Finney provided additional vocals on the latter.

Between 1976 and 1977, he had charted the most instrumental songs of any country music artist. In 1977, the Country Music Association nominated him Instrumentalist of the Year.

Finney continued to operate his appliance store until 2001, when he retired and closed it.

== Discography ==
=== Singles ===
Year	Single	Chart Positions
Year	Single	US Country
1976	"Maiden's Prayer"	84
1976	"Rollin' in My Sweet Baby's Arms"	76
1976	"Waltz Across Texas"	81
1977	"Everybody's Had the Blues"	85
1977	"Coconut Grove"	72
1977	"Poor People of Paris"	85
1978	"I Don't Wanna Cry"	88
1978	"Whispering"	84
1979	"Happy Sax"	92
1979	"Your Love Takes Me So High"	93
1980	"Lonely Wine"	75

=== B-sides ===
Year	Single	Chart Positions	Original A-side
Year	Single	US Country	Original A-side
1976	"San Antonio Stroll"	flip	"Maiden's Prayer"
1976	"The Wild Side of Life"	78	"Rollin' in My Sweet Baby's Arms"
1976	"Off and Running"	flip	"Waltz Across Texas"
1977	"Almost Persuaded"	flip	"Poor People of Paris"
1979	"I Want to Play My Horn on the Grand Ole Opry"	flip	"Your Love Takes Me So High"
"flip" indicates that the release was a two-sided single
