= Roll in My Sweet Baby's Arms =

"Rollin' in My Sweet Baby's Arms"

Single by Buck Owens

from the album Ruby
- B-side: "Corn Liquor"
- Released: August 1971
- Genre: Country, bluegrass
- Length: 2:19
- Label: Capitol
- Songwriter: trad.
- Producer: Buck Owens

Buck Owens singles chronology
"Ruby (Are You Mad)" (1971)	"Rollin' in My Sweet Baby's Arms" (1971)	"I'll Still Be Waiting for You" (1972)

"Roll in My Sweet Baby's Arms" is an American traditional song. It seems to have developed from lyrics in the cowboy song "My Lula Gal", itself a development of bawdy British and Appalachian songs generally known as "Bang Bang Rosie" or "Bang Away Lulu."

The Flatt & Scruggs version was first released as a single by Lester Flatt, Earl Scruggs and the Foggy Mountain Boys, on December 14, 1951. Buck Owens released his cover version "Rollin' in My Sweet Baby's Arms" in August 1971 as the second single from his album Ruby. The song peaked at No. 2 on the Billboard Hot Country Singles chart. It also reached number 1 on the RPM Country Tracks chart in Canada.

== Versions ==
- The earliest recorded version is that of Buster Carter and Preston Young, 1931, with Posey Rorer on fiddle.
- Maury Finney's 1976 version peaked at No. 76 on the Billboard Hot Country Singles chart.

== Chart performance ==
=== Buck Owens ===
Chart (1971)	Peak position
U.S. Billboard Hot Country Singles	2
Canadian RPM Country Tracks	1

=== Leon Russell (as Hank Wilson) ===
Chart (1973)	Peak position
Australia (Kent Music Report)	74
U.S. Billboard Hot Country Singles	57
U.S. Billboard Hot 100	78
Canadian RPM Country Tracks	30

=== Maury Finney ===
Chart (1976)	Peak position
U.S. Billboard Hot Country Singles	76
