= McKinley, Kittson County, Minnesota =

Unorganized territory in Kittson County, Minnesota, United States

Coordinates: 48°56′43″N 96°36′08″W

McKinley, Minnesota
- Unorganized territory
- Location of McKinley, within Kittson County, Minnesota
- Country: United States
- State: Minnesota
- County: Roseau

Area
  - Total: 45.92 sq mi (118.9 km^{2})
  - Land: 45.87 sq mi (118.8 km^{2})
  - Water: 0.05 sq mi (0.13 km^{2})

Population (2020)
  - Total: 38
  - Density: 0.83/sq mi (0.32/km^{2})
- Time zone: UTC-6 (Central (CST))
  - Summer (DST): UTC-5 (CDT)
- Area code: 218

McKinley is an unorganized territory in Kittson County, Minnesota, United States. The population was 38 at the 2020 census.

McKinley was incorporated as McKinley Township in 1902, and named for William McKinley, 25th President of the United States.

== Geography ==
According to the United States Census Bureau, the unorganized territory has a total area of 45.9 square miles (119 km^{2}), of which 45.9 square miles (119 km^{2}) is land and 0.04 square miles (0.10 km^{2}) (0.04%) is water.

== Demographics ==
As of the census of 2000, there were 42 people, 16 households, and 12 families residing in the unorganized territory. The population density was 0.9 people per square mile (0.35 people/km^{2}). There were 22 housing units at an average density of 0.5 per square mile (0.19/km^{2}). The racial makeup of the unorganized territory was 100.00% White.

There were 16 households, out of which 37.5% had children under the age of 18 living with them, 68.8% were married couples living together, 6.3% had a female householder with no husband present, and 25.0% were non-families. 25.0% of all households were made up of individuals, and 12.5% had someone living alone who was 65 years of age or older. The average household size was 2.63 and the average family size was 3.17.

In the unorganized territory the population was spread out, with 35.7% under the age of 18, 2.4% from 18 to 24, 26.2% from 25 to 44, 21.4% from 45 to 64, and 14.3% who were 65 years of age or older. The median age was 38 years. For every 100 females, there were 100.0 males. For every 100 females age 18 and over, there were 107.7 males.

The median income for a household in the unorganized territory was $16,250, and the median income for a family was $16,250. Males had a median income of $21,250 versus $21,250 for females. The per capita income for the unorganized territory was $10,645. There were 40.0% of families and 41.4% of the population living below the poverty line, including 57.1% of under eighteens and 33.3% of those over 64.
