= St. Joseph Township, Kittson County, Minnesota =

Township in Minnesota, United States

St. Joseph Township, Minnesota
- Township
- Location of St. Joseph Township, within Kittson County, Minnesota
- Coordinates: 48°58′13″N 96°44′43″W
- Country: United States
- State: Minnesota
- County: Kittson

Area
  - Total: 45.0 sq mi (116.6 km^{2})
  - Land: 44.8 sq mi (116.0 km^{2})
  - Water: 0.23 sq mi (0.6 km^{2})
- Elevation: 965 ft (294 m)

Population (2020)
  - Total: 32
  - Density: 0.71/sq mi (0.28/km^{2})
- Time zone: UTC-6 (Central (CST))
  - Summer (DST): UTC-5 (CDT)
- FIPS code: 27-57112
- GNIS feature ID: 0665516

St. Joseph Township is a township in Kittson County, Minnesota, United States. The population was 32 at the 2020 census.

St. Joseph Township was organized in 1901, and named by its predominantly Roman Catholic settlers after Saint Joseph.

== Geography ==
According to the United States Census Bureau, the township has a total area of 45.0 square miles (116.6 km^{2}), of which 44.8 square miles (116.0 km^{2}) is land and 0.2 square mile (0.6 km^{2}) (0.51%) is water.

== Demographics ==
As of the census of 2000, there were 57 people, 26 households, and 17 families residing in the township. The population density was 1.3 people per square mile (0.5/km^{2}). There were 42 housing units at an average density of 0.9/sq mi (0.4/km^{2}). The racial makeup of the township was 98.25% White, and 1.75% from two or more races.

There were 26 households, out of which 11.5% had children under the age of 18 living with them, 57.7% were married couples living together, 3.8% had a female householder with no husband present, and 34.6% were non-families. 34.6% of all households were made up of individuals, and 7.7% had someone living alone who was 65 years of age or older. The average household size was 2.19 and the average family size was 2.53.

In the township the population was spread out, with 22.8% under the age of 18, 3.5% from 18 to 24, 14.0% from 25 to 44, 26.3% from 45 to 64, and 33.3% who were 65 years of age or older. The median age was 52 years. For every 100 females, there were 111.1 males. For every 100 females age 18 and over, there were 120.0 males.

The median income for a household in the township was $21,667, and the median income for a family was $25,833. Males had a median income of $36,250 versus $21,250 for females. The per capita income for the township was $15,153. There were no families and 4.4% of the population living below the poverty line, including no under eighteens and none of those over 64.
