= Kittson County, Minnesota =

County in Minnesota, United States

- County
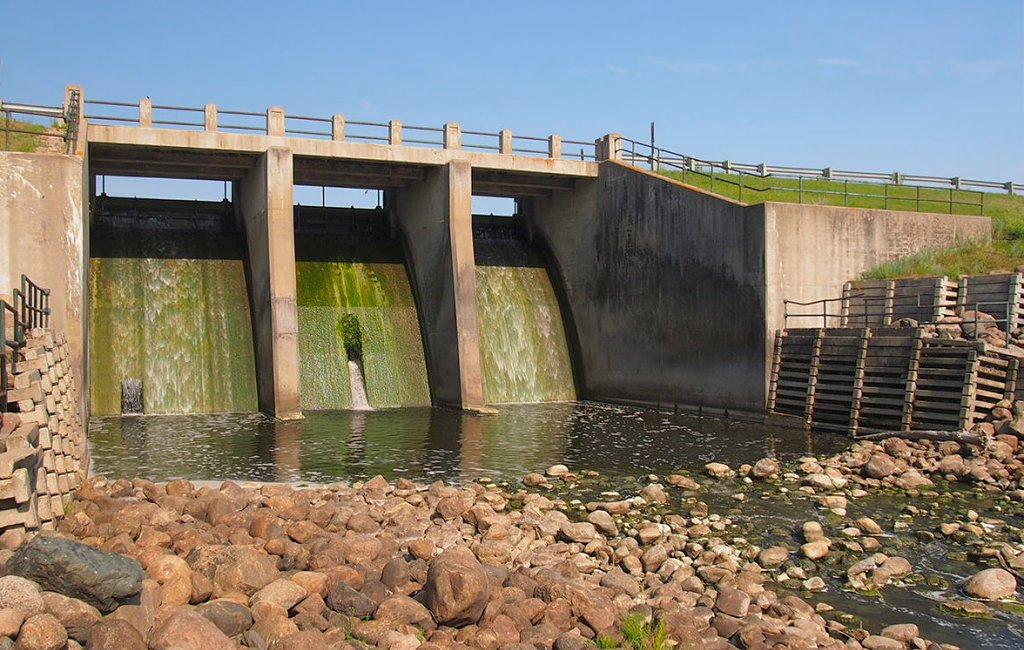
- Lake Bronson Dam

- Location within the U.S. state of Minnesota
- Coordinates: 48°47′N 96°47′W
- Country: United States
- State: Minnesota
- Founded: March 9, 1878 (created by re-naming Pembina Co.); February 25, 1879 (organized)
- Named for: Norman Wolfred Kittson
- Seat: Hallock
- Largest city: Hallock

Area
  - Total: 1,104 sq mi (2,860 km^{2})
  - Land: 1,099 sq mi (2,850 km^{2})
  - Water: 4.8 sq mi (12 km^{2}) 0.4%

Population (2020)
  - Total: 4,207
  - Estimate (2025): 4,031 ▼
  - Density: 3.8/sq mi (1.5/km^{2})
- Time zone: UTC−6 (Central)
  - Summer (DST): UTC−5 (CDT)
- Congressional district: 7th
- Website: www.co.kittson.mn.us

Kittson County is a county in the northwestern corner of the U.S. state of Minnesota along the Canada–US border, south of the Canadian province of Manitoba. As of the 2020 census, the population was 4,207. Its county seat is Hallock.

== History ==
Evidence of occupation dating back 1800 years has been confirmed through archaeological expeditions done in the 1930s and 1970s around the burial mounds on the sand ridges in the eastern part of the county, which date to the Woodland Period. Evidence has been found that the Laurel, Arvilla, St. Croix, and Blackduck complexes were the area's early occupants. About 400 years ago, the Cree, Assiniboine, Sioux and Ojibwe inhabited the county.

The early explorers of the region were fur traders. Pembina, North Dakota's oldest settlement, across the Red River from Kittson County, dates from 1797, when the first trading post was established by Charles Baptiste Chaboillez of the Northwest Fur Company. The Hudson Bay and American Fur Companies were also in Pembina as the fur trading industry increased. The fur traders and voyageurs traveled on the eastern side of the Red. Alexander Henry the younger, who erected a fort for the North West Company in Pembina, is thought to be the first white man to test agriculture in the valley. Joe Rolette, who started a fur post for the American Fur Company in Pembina, and Norman W. Kittson (for whom the county is named), were two early entrepreneurs who opened this area by developing the Red River ox cart trails and broadening the use of oxcarts. The need for oxcarts diminished as steamboats became the new mode for transporting furs and supplies. The railroad eventually replaced the steamboats.

Pembina County was one of five large counties the Minnesota Territory legislature established on October 27, 1849. It was not organized at that time. On March 9, 1878, the legislature renamed Pembina County to Kittson County. On February 25, 1879, Kittson County was divided, creating Marshall County. The county seat, Hallock, was organized in 1880. Kittson County was further diminished in 1894 when Roseau County was partitioned off. Kittson County has retained its present boundaries since 1894.

St. Vincent, which is directly across the Red River from Pembina, was incorporated in 1857, just before statehood. In 1878, the St. Paul & Pacific Railroad line reached St. Vincent and opened the area to settlement. With the railroad coming through, settlers began arriving to stake their claims. Many of the earliest settlers in what became Pembina and St. Vincent were Métis, going back to the late 18th century. The railway extended through the western part of the county, with Donaldson, Kennedy, Hallock, Northcote, Humboldt and St. Vincent along the line. The eastern part of the county was settled in the early 1900s. The Soo Line railroad was completed in 1904 and the communities of Karlstad, Halma, Bronson, Lancaster, Orleans and Noyes were established. Scandinavians, Ukrainians, Polish, Scottish, Irish, English, Germans, French Canadians, Canadian Gaelic speakers from New Brunswick, and Métis all contributed to the county's melting pot.

In March 1915, a law was signed to give Minnesota counties the right to choose whether to allow alcohol sales. At this point, all cities in Kittson had voted to ban alcohol already. Until May 1965, when county option was eliminated, Kittson County was a dry county; no beverages with over 3.2% alcohol could be sold.

Once home to over 10,000 people, the county population declined below 5,000 in 2006.

=== Historic sites ===
Three sites in the county are listed in the National Register of Historic Places: the St. Nicholas Orthodox Church, in Caribou Township; the burial mounds known as the "Lake Bronson Site", in Norway and Percy Townships; and the Lake Bronson State Park WPA/Rustic Style Historic Resources, which include an observation tower and several buildings. Lake Bronson State Park also has interpretive sites for the tower, a pioneer cemetery and the WPA camp.

== Geography ==
Kittson County is in Minnesota's northwest corner, on the borders of North Dakota and Canada. The Red River flows north along the county's western border. The South Fork of Two Rivers flows east through the central part of the county on its way to discharge into the Red; it meets the Middle Fork at Hallock, and the combined flow meets the North Fork a few miles east of the Red. The Joe River flows northwest out of the county into Canada, to discharge into the Red a few miles past the international border.

The county's terrain consists of low rolling hills, devoted to agriculture. The terrain slopes to the north and west, with its highest point near the southeast corner at 1,079 ft (329 m) ASL. The county has an area of 1,104 square miles (2,860 km^{2}), of which 1,099 square miles (2,850 km^{2}) is land and 4.8 square miles (12 km^{2}) (0.4%) is water.

Kittson County was once part of glacial Lake Agassiz. Evidence of this prehistoric lake can still be seen in the county's topography. Remnants of McCauleyville Beach can be found in the eastern part of the county, an area of sandy soil and sand ridges. Other evidence of the glacier and Lake Agassiz is the approximately 140' drop in elevation from the eastern part of the county to the western part, near the Red River Valley, with its proliferation of black rich soil. Lake Bronson is a manmade reservoir, completed in 1937.

Soils of Kittson County

=== Major highways ===
- U.S. Highway 59
- U.S. Highway 75
- Minnesota State Highway 11
- Minnesota State Highway 171
- Minnesota State Highway 175
- Minnesota State Highway 220

=== Adjacent counties and rural municipalities ===
- Town of Emerson, Manitoba (north)
- Rural Municipality of Franklin, Manitoba (north)
- Rural Municipality of Stuartburn, Manitoba (north)
- Roseau County, Minnesota (east)
- Marshall County, Minnesota (south)
- Walsh County, North Dakota (southwest)
- Pembina County, North Dakota (west)

=== Protected areas ===
- Beaches State Wildlife Management Area
- Lake Bronson Parklands Scientific and Natural Area
- Lake Bronson State Park

=== Lakes ===
- Lake Bronson
- Lake Stella
- Twin Lakes

== Demographics ==
Historical population
Census	Pop.	Note	%±
1860	1,612		—
1870	64		−96.0%
1880	905		1,314.1%
1890	5,387		495.2%
1900	7,889		46.4%
1910	9,669		22.6%
1920	10,638		10.0%
1930	9,688		−8.9%
1940	10,717		10.6%
1950	9,649		−10.0%
1960	8,343		−13.5%
1970	6,853		−17.9%
1980	6,672		−2.6%
1990	5,767		−13.6%
2000	5,285		−8.4%
2010	4,552		−13.9%
2020	4,207		−7.6%
2025 (est.)	4,031	▼	−4.2%
U.S. Decennial Census; 1790-1960 1900-1990; 1990-2000 2010-2020

=== Racial and ethnic composition ===
Kittson County, Minnesota – Racial and ethnic composition Note: the US Census treats Hispanic/Latino as an ethnic category. This table excludes Latinos from the racial categories and assigns them to a separate category. Hispanics/Latinos may be of any race.
Race / Ethnicity (NH = Non-Hispanic)	Pop 1980	Pop 1990	Pop 2000	Pop 2010	Pop 2020	% 1980	% 1990	% 2000	% 2010	% 2020
White alone (NH)	6,618	5,706	5,142	4,434	3,974	99.19%	98.94%	97.29%	97.41%	94.46%
Black or African American alone (NH)	0	0	8	11	1	0.00%	0.00%	0.15%	0.24%	0.02%
Native American or Alaska Native alone (NH)	6	5	14	4	15	0.09%	0.09%	0.26%	0.09%	0.36%
Asian alone (NH)	7	10	13	14	17	0.10%	0.17%	0.25%	0.31%	0.40%
Native Hawaiian or Pacific Islander alone (NH)	x	x	0	0	6	x	x	0.00%	0.00%	0.14%
Other race alone (NH)	0	0	1	0	14	0.00%	0.00%	0.02%	0.00%	0.33%
Mixed race or Multiracial (NH)	x	x	40	20	97	x	x	0.76%	0.44%	2.31%
Hispanic or Latino (any race)	41	46	67	69	83	0.61%	0.80%	1.27%	1.52%	1.97%
Total	6,672	5,767	5,285	4,552	4,207	100.00%	100.00%	100.00%	100.00%	100.00%

=== 2020 census ===
As of the 2020 census, the county had a population of 4,207. The median age was 48.9 years. 21.2% of residents were under the age of 18 and 26.6% of residents were 65 years of age or older. For every 100 females there were 101.3 males, and for every 100 females age 18 and over there were 101.2 males age 18 and over.

The racial makeup of the county was 95.3% White, 0.1% Black or African American, 0.4% American Indian and Alaska Native, 0.4% Asian, 0.1% Native Hawaiian and Pacific Islander, 0.5% from some other race, and 3.2% from two or more races. Hispanic or Latino residents of any race comprised 2.0% of the population.

<0.1% of residents lived in urban areas, while 100.0% lived in rural areas.

There were 1,846 households in the county, of which 23.0% had children under the age of 18 living in them. Of all households, 53.0% were married-couple households, 21.2% were households with a male householder and no spouse or partner present, and 20.9% were households with a female householder and no spouse or partner present. About 34.6% of all households were made up of individuals and 18.2% had someone living alone who was 65 years of age or older.

There were 2,272 housing units, of which 18.8% were vacant. Among occupied housing units, 81.0% were owner-occupied and 19.0% were renter-occupied. The homeowner vacancy rate was 2.0% and the rental vacancy rate was 12.2%.

=== 2000 census ===
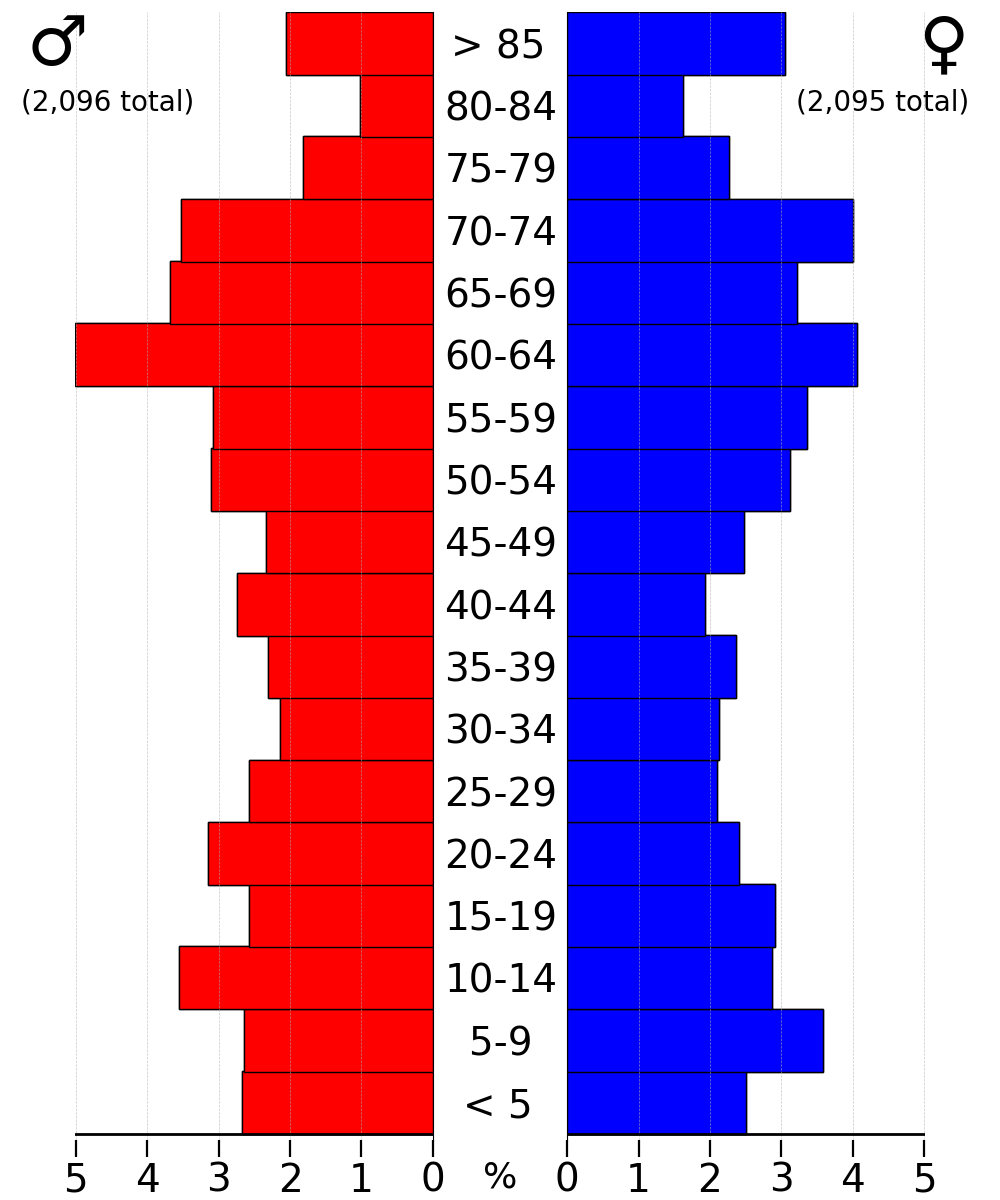
2022 US Census population pyramid for Kittson County, from ACS 5-year estimates

As of the census of 2000, there were 5,285 people, 2,167 households, and 1,447 families in the county. The population density was 4.81 per square mile (1.86/km^{2}). There were 2,719 housing units at an average density of 2.47 per square mile (0.95/km^{2}). The racial makeup of the county was 98.09% White, 0.15% Black or African American, 0.26% Native American, 0.25% Asian, 0.38% from other races, and 0.87% from two or more races. 1.27% of the population were Hispanic or Latino of any race. 30.1% were of Norwegian, 25.7% Swedish, 13.7% German and 6.6% Polish ancestry. Kittson County had the highest percentage of Swedish speakers of any county in the United States.

There were 2,167 households, of which 29.2% had children under age 18 living with them, 57.4% were married couples living together, 6.0% had a female householder with no husband present, and 33.2% were non-families. 30.5% of all households were made up of individuals, and 16.3% had someone living alone who was 65 or older. The average household size was 2.37 and the average family size was 2.96.

The county population contained 25.1% under age 18, 5.5% from 18 to 24, 23.7% from 25 to 44, 24.20% from 45 to 64, and 21.60% who were 65 or older. The median age was 42. For every 100 females there were 98.4 males. For every 100 females 18 and over, there were 98.6 males.

The median income for a household in the county was $32,515, and the median income for a family was $40,072. Males had a median income of $30,240 versus $21,320 for females. The per capita income for the county was $16,525. About 8.0% of families and 10.2% of the population were below the poverty line, including 11.3% of those under 18 and 10.4% of those 65 or older.

== Communities ==
=== Cities ===
- Donaldson
- Hallock (county seat)
- Halma
- Humboldt
- Karlstad
- Kennedy
- Lake Bronson (named "Bronson" until 1939)
- Lancaster
- St. Vincent

=== Unincorporated communities ===
- Caribou
- Northcote
- Noyes
- Orleans
- Robbin

=== Ghost town ===
- Pelan

Townships and unorganized territories of Kittson County

=== Townships ===
- Arveson Township
- Cannon Township
- Caribou Township
- Clow Township
- Davis Township
- Deerwood Township
- Granville Township
- Hallock Township
- Hampden Township
- Hazelton Township
- Hill Township
- Jupiter Township
- Norway Township
- Pelan Township
- Percy Township
- Poppleton Township
- Richardville Township
- St. Joseph Township
- St. Vincent Township
- Skane Township
- South Red River Township
- Spring Brook Township
- Svea Township
- Tegner Township
- Teien Township
- Thompson Township

=== Unorganized territories ===
- East Kittson
- McKinley
- North Red River

== Politics ==
Kittson County has been a swing county for several decades, tending to vote Democratic. As of 2020, the county has selected the Democratic nominee in 60% of presidential elections since 1980. However in 2016, the county shifted hard to the right, with Donald Trump carrying the county by 22 points, after the county voted for Obama by 6 points in 2012. Trump would carry Kittson County again in 2020 and 2024, both times by wide margins and in 2024 with over 61% of the vote, the best performance for a Republican presidential candidate since Warren G. Harding in 1920.

United States presidential election results for Kittson County, Minnesota
Year	Republican		Democratic		Third party(ies)	
Year	No.	%	No.	%	No.	%
1892	408	32.46%	307	24.42%	542	43.12%
1896	753	48.36%	762	48.94%	42	2.70%
1900	885	58.96%	562	37.44%	54	3.60%
1904	1,076	81.27%	157	11.86%	91	6.87%
1908	969	62.16%	499	32.01%	91	5.84%
1912	185	12.76%	362	24.97%	903	62.28%
1916	709	43.98%	749	46.46%	154	9.55%
1920	2,485	74.65%	599	17.99%	245	7.36%
1924	1,333	42.88%	249	8.01%	1,527	49.12%
1928	1,957	56.81%	1,383	40.15%	105	3.05%
1932	950	27.81%	2,332	68.27%	134	3.92%
1936	1,080	25.30%	3,127	73.25%	62	1.45%
1940	1,279	28.55%	3,167	70.69%	34	0.76%
1944	983	26.16%	2,752	73.25%	22	0.59%
1948	1,035	24.74%	2,970	71.00%	178	4.26%
1952	1,837	43.08%	2,387	55.98%	40	0.94%
1956	1,569	41.31%	2,222	58.50%	7	0.18%
1960	1,937	46.51%	2,218	53.25%	10	0.24%
1964	1,153	29.23%	2,790	70.72%	2	0.05%
1968	1,436	40.88%	1,894	53.91%	183	5.21%
1972	1,832	52.66%	1,584	45.53%	63	1.81%
1976	1,555	42.85%	2,008	55.33%	66	1.82%
1980	1,875	52.42%	1,407	39.33%	295	8.25%
1984	1,716	51.24%	1,610	48.07%	23	0.69%
1988	1,381	45.18%	1,650	53.97%	26	0.85%
1992	1,098	36.80%	1,307	43.80%	579	19.40%
1996	1,055	38.38%	1,394	50.71%	300	10.91%
2000	1,353	51.31%	1,107	41.98%	177	6.71%
2004	1,307	48.73%	1,333	49.70%	42	1.57%
2008	1,016	39.56%	1,492	58.10%	60	2.34%
2012	1,095	45.25%	1,241	51.28%	84	3.47%
2016	1,349	56.56%	823	34.51%	213	8.93%
2020	1,546	58.58%	1,006	38.12%	87	3.30%
2024	1,535	61.40%	911	36.44%	54	2.16%

== See also ==
- National Register of Historic Places listings in Kittson County, Minnesota
