= Davis Township, Kittson County, Minnesota =

Township in Minnesota, United States

Davis Township, Minnesota
- Township
- Location of Davis Township, within Kittson County, Minnesota
- Coordinates: 48°35′39″N 96°51′22″W
- Country: United States
- State: Minnesota
- County: Kittson

Area
  - Total: 35.3 sq mi (91.5 km^{2})
  - Land: 35.3 sq mi (91.4 km^{2})
  - Water: 0.039 sq mi (0.1 km^{2})
- Elevation: 846 ft (258 m)

Population (2020)
  - Total: 35
  - Density: 0.99/sq mi (0.38/km^{2})
- Time zone: UTC-6 (Central (CST))
  - Summer (DST): UTC-5 (CDT)
- FIPS code: 27-14950
- GNIS feature ID: 0663933

Davis Township is a township in Kittson County, Minnesota, United States. The population was 35 at the 2020 census.

Davis Township was organized in 1882, and named for Edward N. Davis, a county official.

== Geography ==
According to the United States Census Bureau, the township has a total area of 35.3 square miles (91 km^{2}), of which 35.3 square miles (91 km^{2}) is land and 0.04 square miles (0.10 km^{2}) (0.11%) is water.

== Demographics ==
As of the census of 2000, there were 48 people, 19 households, and 15 families residing in the township. The population density was 1.4 inhabitants per square mile (0.54/km^{2}). There were 25 housing units at an average density of 0.7 per square mile (0.27/km^{2}). The racial makeup of the township was 95.83% White, and 4.17% from two or more races. Hispanic or Latino of any race were 2.08% of the population.

There were 19 households, out of which 31.6% had children under the age of 18 living with them, 78.9% were married couples living together, and 15.8% were non-families. 15.8% of all households were made up of individuals, and 10.5% had someone living alone who was 65 years of age or older. The average household size was 2.53 and the average family size was 2.81.

In the township the population was spread out, with 22.9% under the age of 18, 6.3% from 18 to 24, 18.8% from 25 to 44, 27.1% from 45 to 64, and 25.0% who were 65 years of age or older. The median age was 48 years. For every 100 females, there were 108.7 males. For every 100 females age 18 and over, there were 131.3 males.

The median income for a household in the township was $33,750, and the median income for a family was $32,500. Males had a median income of $30,417 versus $38,750 for females. The per capita income for the township was $17,189. None of the population and none of the families were below the poverty line.
