= Caribou Township, Kittson County, Minnesota =

Township in Minnesota, United States

Caribou Township, Minnesota
- Township
- Location of Caribou Township, within Kittson County, Minnesota
- Coordinates: 48°57′18″N 96°27′18″W
- Country: United States
- State: Minnesota
- County: Kittson

Area
  - Total: 44.2 sq mi (114.5 km^{2})
  - Land: 44.2 sq mi (114.5 km^{2})
  - Water: 0.039 sq mi (0.1 km^{2})
- Elevation: 1,020 ft (311 m)

Population (2020)
  - Total: 32
  - Density: 0.72/sq mi (0.28/km^{2})
- Time zone: UTC-6 (Central (CST))
  - Summer (DST): UTC-5 (CDT)
- FIPS code: 27-09874
- GNIS feature ID: 0663748

Caribou Township is a township in Kittson County, Minnesota, United States.

Caribou Township was organized in 1908, and named for the migratory woodland caribou in the area. The population was 32 at the 2020 census.

== Geography ==
According to the United States Census Bureau, the township has a total area of 44.2 square miles (114 km^{2}), of which 44.2 square miles (114 km^{2}) is land and 0.04 square miles (0.10 km^{2}) (0.07%) is water.

== Demographics ==
As of the census of 2000, there were 48 people, 14 households, and 13 families residing in the township. The population density was 1.1 inhabitants per square mile (0.42/km^{2}). There were 22 housing units at an average density of 0.5 per square mile (0.19/km^{2}). The racial makeup of the township was 100.00% White.

There were 14 households, out of which 42.9% had children under the age of 18 living with them, 78.6% were married couples living together, 7.1% had a female householder with no husband present, and 7.1% were non-families. 7.1% of all households were made up of individuals, and 7.1% had someone living alone who was 65 years of age or older. The average household size was 3.43 and the average family size was 3.62.

In the township the population was spread out, with 35.4% under the age of 18, 8.3% from 18 to 24, 12.5% from 25 to 44, 25.0% from 45 to 64, and 18.8% who were 65 years of age or older. The median age was 42 years. For every 100 females, there were 152.6 males. For every 100 females age 18 and over, there were 106.7 males.

The median income for a household in the township was $30,625, and the median income for a family was $31,875. Males had a median income of $25,417 versus $16,875 for females. The per capita income for the township was $8,835. There were 13.3% of families and 16.3% of the population living below the poverty line, including 16.7% of under eighteens and 25.0% of those over 64.
