= Svea Township, Kittson County, Minnesota =

Township in Minnesota, United States

Svea Township, Minnesota
- Township
- Location of Svea Township, within Kittson County, Minnesota
- Coordinates: 48°35′41″N 96°59′17″W
- Country: United States
- State: Minnesota
- County: Kittson

Area
  - Total: 35.8 sq mi (92.8 km^{2})
  - Land: 35.8 sq mi (92.8 km^{2})
  - Water: 0 sq mi (0.0 km^{2})
- Elevation: 807 ft (246 m)

Population (2020)
  - Total: 35
  - Density: 0.98/sq mi (0.38/km^{2})
- Time zone: UTC-6 (Central (CST))
  - Summer (DST): UTC-5 (CDT)
- FIPS code: 27-63652
- GNIS feature ID: 0665746

Svea Township is a township in Kittson County, Minnesota, United States. The population was 35 at the 2020 census.

== History ==
Svea Township was organized in 1884, and named for Mother Svea, a national symbol of Sweden.

== Geography ==
According to the United States Census Bureau, the township has a total area of 35.8 square miles (92.8 km^{2}), all land.

== Demographics ==
As of the census of 2000, there were 60 people, 21 households, and 14 families residing in the township. The population density was 1.7 people per square mile (0.6/km^{2}). There were 23 housing units at an average density of 0.6/sq mi (0.2/km^{2}). The racial makeup of the township was 95.00% White, 1.67% Asian, and 3.33% from two or more races. Hispanic or Latino of any race were 1.67% of the population.

There were 21 households, out of which 33.3% had children under the age of 18 living with them, 57.1% were married couples living together, 4.8% had a female householder with no husband present, and 33.3% were non-families. 33.3% of all households were made up of individuals, and 19.0% had someone living alone who was 65 years of age or older. The average household size was 2.86 and the average family size was 3.57.

In the township the population was spread out, with 31.7% under the age of 18, 6.7% from 18 to 24, 25.0% from 25 to 44, 28.3% from 45 to 64, and 8.3% who were 65 years of age or older. The median age was 35 years. For every 100 females, there were 93.5 males. For every 100 females age 18 and over, there were 78.3 males.

The median income for a household in the township was $36,563, and the median income for a family was $51,250. Males had a median income of $28,000 versus $51,250 for females. The per capita income for the township was $25,079. There were 12.5% of families and 9.0% of the population living below the poverty line, including 8.0% of under eighteens and none of those over 64.
