= Halma, Minnesota =

City in Minnesota, United States

Halma
- City
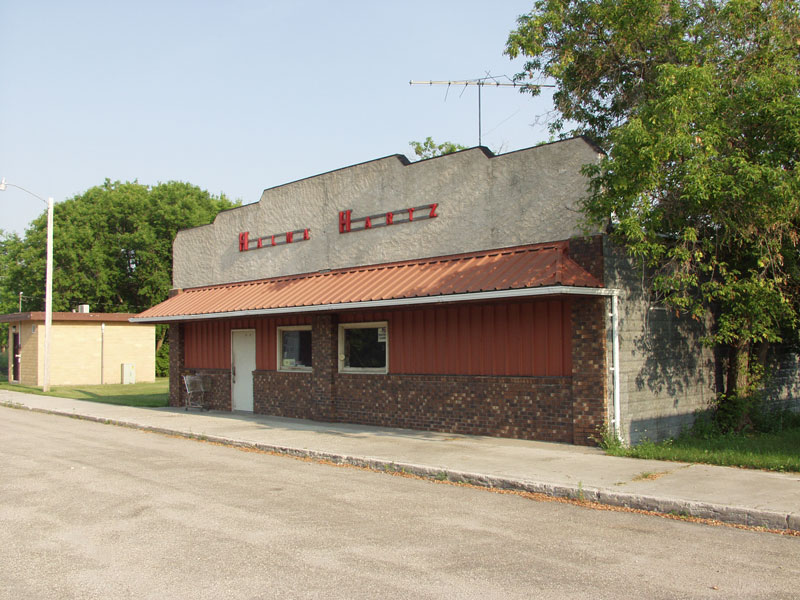
- Store on Main Street

- Location of Halma, Minnesota
- Coordinates: 48°39′35″N 96°35′55″W
- Country: United States
- State: Minnesota
- County: Kittson

Area
  - Total: 0.95 sq mi (2.45 km^{2})
  - Land: 0.94 sq mi (2.43 km^{2})
  - Water: 0.0077 sq mi (0.02 km^{2})
- Elevation: 997 ft (304 m)

Population (2020)
  - Total: 58
  - Density: 61.9/sq mi (23.91/km^{2})
- Time zone: UTC-6 (CST)
  - Summer (DST): UTC-5 (CDT)
- ZIP code: 56729
- Area code: 218
- FIPS code: 27-26612
- GNIS feature ID: 0644586

Halma is a city in Kittson County, Minnesota, United States. The population was 58 at the 2020 census.

== History ==
A post office called Halma began operation in 1904 and was closed in 2009. According to the Federal Writers' Project, the name may be derived from the surname Holm.

== Geography ==
According to the United States Census Bureau, the city has a total area of 0.91 square miles (2.36 km^{2}), of which 0.90 square miles (2.33 km^{2}) is land and 0.01 square miles (0.03 km^{2}) is water.

Halma is located along U.S. Highway 59, near Kittson County Roads 7 and 20.

== Demographics ==
Historical population
Census	Pop.	Note	%±
1930	129		—
1940	158		22.5%
1950	177		12.0%
1960	115		−35.0%
1970	96		−16.5%
1980	97		1.0%
1990	73		−24.7%
2000	78		6.8%
2010	61		−21.8%
2020	58		−4.9%
U.S. Decennial Census; 2020 Census

=== 2010 census ===
As of the census of 2010, there were 61 people, 26 households, and 17 families living in the city. The population density was 67.8 inhabitants per square mile (26.2/km^{2}). There were 34 housing units at an average density of 37.8 per square mile (14.6/km^{2}). The racial makeup of the city was 95.1% White and 4.9% from two or more races.

There were 26 households, of which 42.3% had children under the age of 18 living with them, 42.3% were married couples living together, 7.7% had a female householder with no husband present, 15.4% had a male householder with no wife present, and 34.6% were non-families. 34.6% of all households were made up of individuals, and 7.6% had someone living alone who was 65 years of age or older. The average household size was 2.35 and the average family size was 2.88.

The median age in the city was 35.8 years. 29.5% of residents were under the age of 18; 6.6% were between the ages of 18 and 24; 27.9% were from 25 to 44; 29.6% were from 45 to 64; and 6.6% were 65 years of age or older. The gender makeup of the city was 50.8% male and 49.2% female.

=== 2000 census ===
As of the census of 2000, there were 78 people, 32 households, and 23 families living in the city. The population density was 83.9 inhabitants per square mile (32.4/km^{2}). There were 38 housing units at an average density of 40.9 per square mile (15.8/km^{2}). The racial makeup of the city was 100.00% White. Hispanic or Latino of any race were 1.28% of the population.

There were 32 households, out of which 31.3% had children under the age of 18 living with them, 62.5% were married couples living together, 3.1% had a female householder with no husband present, and 28.1% were non-families. 25.0% of all households were made up of individuals, and none had someone living alone who was 65 years of age or older. The average household size was 2.44 and the average family size was 2.78.

In the city, the population was spread out, with 28.2% under the age of 18, 6.4% from 18 to 24, 29.5% from 25 to 44, 24.4% from 45 to 64, and 11.5% who were 65 years of age or older. The median age was 33 years. For every 100 females, there were 122.9 males. For every 100 females age 18 and over, there were 133.3 males.

The median income for a household in the city was $27,917, and the median income for a family was $28,750. Males had a median income of $25,000 versus $21,000 for females. The per capita income for the city was $13,541. There were no families and 5.7% of the population living below the poverty line, including no under eighteens and none of those over 64.
