= Hill Township, Kittson County, Minnesota =

Township in Minnesota, United States

Hill Township, Minnesota
- Township
- Location of Hill Township, within Kittson County, Minnesota
- Coordinates: 48°50′25″N 97°7′2″W
- Country: United States
- State: Minnesota
- County: Kittson

Area
  - Total: 32.3 sq mi (83.6 km^{2})
  - Land: 32.0 sq mi (82.8 km^{2})
  - Water: 0.27 sq mi (0.7 km^{2})
- Elevation: 797 ft (243 m)

Population (2020)
  - Total: 22
  - Density: 0.69/sq mi (0.27/km^{2})
- Time zone: UTC-6 (Central (CST))
  - Summer (DST): UTC-5 (CDT)
- FIPS code: 27-29078
- GNIS feature ID: 0664473

Hill Township is a township in Kittson County, Minnesota, United States. The population was 22 at the 2020 census.

Hill Township was organized in 1901, and named for James J. Hill, a railroad official.

== Geography ==
According to the United States Census Bureau, the township has a total area of 32.3 square miles (84 km^{2}), of which 32.0 square miles (83 km^{2}) is land and 0.3 square miles (0.78 km^{2}) (0.90%) is water.

== Demographics ==
As of the census of 2000, there were 18 people, 7 households, and 7 families residing in the township. The population density was 0.6 inhabitants per square mile (0.23/km^{2}). There were 10 housing units at an average density of 0.3 per square mile (0.12/km^{2}). The racial makeup of the township was 100.00% White.

There were 7 households, out of which 28.6% had children under the age of 18 living with them, 100.0% were married couples living together, and 0.0% were non-families. No households were made up of individuals, and none had someone living alone who was 65 years of age or older. The average household size was 2.57 and the average family size was 2.57.

In the township the population was spread out, with 11.1% under the age of 18, 11.1% from 18 to 24, 44.4% from 25 to 44, 11.1% from 45 to 64, and 22.2% who were 65 years of age or older. The median age was 40 years. For every 100 females, there were 157.1 males. For every 100 females age 18 and over, there were 128.6 males.

The median income for a household in the township was $34,167, and the median income for a family was $34,167. Males had a median income of $46,250 versus $0 for females. The per capita income for the township was $9,814. About 16.7% of families and 27.3% of the population were below the poverty line, including 50.0% of those under 18 and none of those over 64.
