= Skane Township, Kittson County, Minnesota =

Township in Minnesota, United States

Skane Township, Minnesota
- Township
- Nickname: Skane
- Location of Skane Township, within Kittson County, Minnesota
- Coordinates: 48°40′14″N 96°59′13″W
- Country: United States
- State: Minnesota
- County: Kittson

Area
  - Total: 35.4 sq mi (92 km^{2})
  - Land: 35.344 sq mi (91.54 km^{2})
  - Water: 0.056 sq mi (0.15 km^{2})
- Elevation: 807 ft (246 m)

Population (2020)
  - Total: 45
  - Density: 1.3/sq mi (0.49/km^{2})
- Time zone: UTC-6 (Central (CST))
  - Summer (DST): UTC-5 (CDT)
- FIPS code: 27-60646
- GNIS feature ID: 0665626

Skane Township is a township in Kittson County, Minnesota, United States. The population as of the 2020 census is 45.

Skane Township was organized in 1887, and named after Scania, in Sweden.

== Geography ==
According to Sperling's BestPlaces, the township has a total area of 35.4 square miles, all but 0.056 square mile land.

== Demographics ==
As of 2022, 73 people were living in the township. The racial makeup of the township was 98.5% Non-Hispanic White and 1.5% Black or African American.

In 2000, there were 22 households, out of which 54.5% had children under the age of 18 living with them, 72.7% were married couples living together, and 22.7% were non-families. 22.7% of all households were made up of individuals, and none had someone living alone who was 65 years of age or older. The average household size was 2.95 and the average family size was 3.53.

The 2000 population was spread out, with 33.8% under the age of 18, 10.8% from 18 to 24, 26.2% from 25 to 44, 26.2% from 45 to 64, and 3.1% who were 65 years of age or older. The median age was 33 years. For every 100 females, there were 109.7 males. For every 100 females age 18 and over, there were 138.9 males.

The median income for a household in the township in 2000 was $40,833, and the median income for a family was $58,125. Males had a median income of $25,625 versus $21,250 for females. The per capita income for the township was $22,098. There were no families and 4.3% of the population living below the poverty line, including no under eighteens and none of those over 64.

As of 2015, over 90% of the inhabitants are religious Christians. The nearly 60% Lutheran community is particularly large. The second largest community is the Catholic community at 11% of the population. There are no reported Jews, Muslims, or followers of Eastern Religions currently living in the township.
