= Norway Township, Kittson County, Minnesota =

Township in Minnesota, United States

Norway Township, Minnesota
- Township
- Location of Norway Township, within Kittson County, Minnesota
- Coordinates: 48°40′16″N 96°36′30″W
- Country: United States
- State: Minnesota
- County: Kittson

Area
  - Total: 35.2 sq mi (91.1 km^{2})
  - Land: 35.1 sq mi (90.8 km^{2})
  - Water: 0.15 sq mi (0.4 km^{2})
- Elevation: 997 ft (304 m)

Population (2020)
  - Total: 94
  - Density: 2.7/sq mi (1.0/km^{2})
- Time zone: UTC-6 (Central (CST))
  - Summer (DST): UTC-5 (CDT)
- FIPS code: 27-47410
- GNIS feature ID: 0665179

Norway Township is a township in Kittson County, Minnesota, United States. The population was 94 at the 2020 census.

Norway Township was organized in 1901. A large share of the early settlers being natives of Norway caused the name to be selected.

== Geography ==
According to the United States Census Bureau, the township has a total area of 35.2 square miles (91.1 km^{2}), of which 35.1 square miles (90.8 km^{2}) is land and 0.1 square mile (0.4 km^{2}) (0.40%) is water.

== Demographics ==
As of the census of 2000, there were 94 people, 40 households, and 28 families residing in the township. The population density was 2.7 people per square mile (1.0/km^{2}). There were 49 housing units at an average density of 1.4/sq mi (0.5/km^{2}). The racial makeup of the township was 95.74% White, and 4.26% from two or more races. Hispanic or Latino of any race were 1.06% of the population.

There were 40 households, out of which 25.0% had children under the age of 18 living with them, 62.5% were married couples living together, 2.5% had a female householder with no husband present, and 30.0% were non-families. 27.5% of all households were made up of individuals, and 22.5% had someone living alone who was 65 years of age or older. The average household size was 2.35 and the average family size was 2.86.

In the township the population was spread out, with 23.4% under the age of 18, 3.2% from 18 to 24, 25.5% from 25 to 44, 28.7% from 45 to 64, and 19.1% who were 65 years of age or older. The median age was 43 years. For every 100 females, there were 104.3 males. For every 100 females age 18 and over, there were 111.8 males.

The median income for a household in the township was $32,188, and the median income for a family was $38,125. Males had a median income of $31,500 versus $21,250 for females. The per capita income for the township was $14,754. There were 3.7% of families and 7.1% of the population living below the poverty line, including no under eighteens and 9.5% of those over 64.
