= Richardville Township, Kittson County, Minnesota =

Township in Minnesota, United States

Richardville Township, Minnesota
- Township
- Location of Richardville Township, within Kittson County, Minnesota
- Coordinates: 48°56′29″N 96°52′31″W
- Country: United States
- State: Minnesota
- County: Kittson

Area
  - Total: 45.3 sq mi (117.3 km^{2})
  - Land: 45.3 sq mi (117.2 km^{2})
  - Water: 0.039 sq mi (0.1 km^{2})
- Elevation: 909 ft (277 m)

Population (2020)
  - Total: 107
  - Density: 2.36/sq mi (0.913/km^{2})
- Time zone: UTC-6 (Central (CST))
  - Summer (DST): UTC-5 (CDT)
- FIPS code: 27-54196
- GNIS feature ID: 0665412

Richardville Township is a township in Kittson County, Minnesota, United States. The population was 107 at the 2020 census.

Richardville Township was organized in 1895, and named for George Richards, a pioneer settler.

== Geography ==
According to the United States Census Bureau, the township has a total area of 45.3 square miles (117.3 km^{2}), of which 45.2 square miles (117.2 km^{2}) is land and 0.1 square mile (0.1 km^{2}) (0.11%) is water.

== Demographics ==
As of the census of 2000, there were 110 people, 43 households, and 30 families residing in the township. The population density was 2.4 people per square mile (0.9/km^{2}). There were 53 housing units at an average density of 1.2/sq mi (0.5/km^{2}). The racial makeup of the township was 100.00% White.

There were 43 households, out of which 34.9% had children under the age of 18 living with them, 67.4% were married couples living together, and 30.2% were non-families. 25.6% of all households were made up of individuals, and 14.0% had someone living alone who was 65 years of age or older. The average household size was 2.56 and the average family size was 3.17.

In the township the population was spread out, with 27.3% under the age of 18, 10.0% from 18 to 24, 25.5% from 25 to 44, 27.3% from 45 to 64, and 10.0% who were 65 years of age or older. The median age was 39 years. For every 100 females, there were 120.0 males. For every 100 females age 18 and over, there were 122.2 males.

The median income for a household in the township was $37,813, and the median income for a family was $38,594. Males had a median income of $20,000 versus $17,250 for females. The per capita income for the township was $13,892. There were 9.1% of families and 5.3% of the population living below the poverty line, including 3.2% of under eighteens and none of those over 64.
