= North Red River, Minnesota =

Unorganized territory in Minnesota, United States

- Unorganized territory
- Location of North Red River, within Kittson County, Minnesota
- Coordinates: 48°46′4″N 97°7′1″W
- Country: United States
- State: Minnesota

Area
  - Total: 23.7 sq mi (61.4 km^{2})
  - Land: 23.4 sq mi (60.6 km^{2})
  - Water: 0.31 sq mi (0.8 km^{2})

Population (2020)
  - Total: 0
  - Density: 0/sq mi (0/km^{2})
- Time zone: UTC-6 (Central (CST))
  - Summer (DST): UTC-5 (CDT)
- FIPS code: 27-47176

North Red River is an unorganized territory located in Kittson County, Minnesota, United States. The area was organized as a civil township, North Red River Township, until Kittson County dissolved the township in 2000 following a vote in the Minnesota legislature that allowed the county to do so without an election. In 2000, the township had a population of three, and as of the 2010 census, the territory had a total population of zero. As of the 2020 census, the unorganized territory still remains uninhabited.

== Geography ==
According to the United States Census Bureau, the territory has a total area of 23.7 square miles (61.4 km^{2}), of which 23.4 square miles (60.6 km^{2}) is land and 0.3 square mile (0.8 km^{2}; 1.31%) is water.

== Demographics ==
As of the census of 2000, there were 3 people, 2 households, and 1 family residing in the township. The population density was 0.1 inhabitants per square mile (0.039/km^{2}). There were 4 housing units at an average density of 0.2 per square mile (0.077/km^{2}). The racial makeup of the township was 100.00% White.

There were 2 households, out of which none had children under the age of 18 living with them, none were married couples living together, none had a female householder with no husband present, and 50.0% were non-families. 50.0% of all households were made up of individuals, and none had someone living alone who was 65 years of age or older. The average household size was 1.50 and the average family size was 2.00.

In the township the population was spread out, with 1 person from 18 to 24, 1 person from 45 to 64, and 1 person who was 65 years of age or older. The median age was 54 years. There was 1 female and 2 males in the township, all over the age of 18.

The median income for a household in the township was $13,750, and the median income for a family was $18,750. The per capita income for the township was $8,983. 1 of the 3 people was below the poverty line.
