= Jupiter Township, Kittson County, Minnesota =

Township in Minnesota, United States

Jupiter Township, Minnesota
- Township
- Location of Jupiter Township, within Kittson County, Minnesota
- Coordinates: 48°40′53″N 96°43′32″W
- Country: United States
- State: Minnesota
- County: Kittson

Area
  - Total: 35.7 sq mi (92.5 km^{2})
  - Land: 35.7 sq mi (92.5 km^{2})
  - Water: 0 sq mi (0.0 km^{2})
- Elevation: 932 ft (284 m)

Population (2020)
  - Total: 109
  - Density: 3.05/sq mi (1.18/km^{2})
- Time zone: UTC-6 (Central (CST))
  - Summer (DST): UTC-5 (CDT)
- FIPS code: 27-32228
- GNIS feature ID: 0664591

Jupiter Township is a township in Kittson County, Minnesota, United States. The population was 109 at the 2020 census.

Jupiter Township was organized in 1883, and named after planet Jupiter.

== Geography ==
According to the United States Census Bureau, the township has a total area of 35.7 square miles (92 km^{2}), all land.

== Demographics ==
As of the census of 2000, there were 136 people, 50 households, and 45 families residing in the township. The population density was 3.8 inhabitants per square mile (1.5/km^{2}). There were 73 housing units at an average density of 2.0 per square mile (0.77/km^{2}). The racial makeup of the township was 100.00% White.

There were 50 households, out of which 26.0% had children under the age of 18 living with them, 82.0% were married couples living together, 4.0% had a female householder with no husband present, and 10.0% were non-families. 6.0% of all households were made up of individuals, and 4.0% had someone living alone who was 65 years of age or older. The average household size was 2.72 and the average family size was 2.84.

In the township the population was spread out, with 23.5% under the age of 18, 4.4% from 18 to 24, 19.1% from 25 to 44, 26.5% from 45 to 64, and 26.5% who were 65 years of age or older. The median age was 47 years. For every 100 females, there were 109.2 males. For every 100 females age 18 and over, there were 108.0 males.

The median income for a household in the township was $43,542, and the median income for a family was $47,500. Males had a median income of $31,875 versus $17,500 for females. The per capita income for the township was $18,712. There were no families and 3.2% of the population living below the poverty line, including no under eighteens and none of those over 64.
