= Tegner Township, Kittson County, Minnesota =

Township in Minnesota, United States

Tegner Township, Minnesota
- Township
- Location of Tegner Township, within Kittson County, Minnesota
- Coordinates: 48°40′0″N 96°51′22″W
- Country: United States
- State: Minnesota
- County: Kittson

Area
  - Total: 35.7 sq mi (92.5 km^{2})
  - Land: 35.7 sq mi (92.4 km^{2})
  - Water: 0.039 sq mi (0.1 km^{2})
- Elevation: 843 ft (257 m)

Population (2020)
  - Total: 38
  - Density: 1.1/sq mi (0.41/km^{2})
- Time zone: UTC-6 (Central (CST))
  - Summer (DST): UTC-5 (CDT)
- FIPS code: 27-64336
- GNIS feature ID: 0665770

Tegner Township is a township in Kittson County, Minnesota, United States. The population was 38 at the 2020 census.

Tegner Township was organized in 1882, and named for Esaias Tegnér, a Swedish writer.

== Geography ==
According to the United States Census Bureau, the township has a total area of 35.7 square miles (92.5 km^{2}), of which 35.7 square miles (92.4 km^{2}) is land and 0.04 square mile (0.1 km^{2}) (0.06%) is water.

== Demographics ==
As of the census of 2000, there were 67 people, 23 households, and 18 families residing in the township. The population density was 1.9 people per square mile (0.7/km^{2}). There were 27 housing units at an average density of 0.8/sq mi (0.3/km^{2}). The racial makeup of the township was 100.00% White.

There were 23 households, out of which 43.5% had children under the age of 18 living with them, 73.9% were married couples living together, 4.3% had a female householder with no husband present, and 21.7% were non-families. 21.7% of all households were made up of individuals, and 13.0% had someone living alone who was 65 years of age or older. The average household size was 2.91 and the average family size was 3.44.

In the township the population was spread out, with 32.8% under the age of 18, 6.0% from 18 to 24, 19.4% from 25 to 44, 29.9% from 45 to 64, and 11.9% who were 65 years of age or older. The median age was 42 years. For every 100 females, there were 86.1 males. For every 100 females age 18 and over, there were 104.5 males.

The median income for a household in the township was $31,250, and the median income for a family was $35,625. Males had a median income of $23,750 versus $21,250 for females. The per capita income for the township was $14,021. There were 8.3% of families and 19.4% of the population living below the poverty line, including 18.8% of people under 18 and none of those over 64.
