= Split Hand Creek =

Stream in Itasca County, Minnesota, U.S.

Coordinates: 47°03′25″N 93°22′59″W

Split Hand Creek is a stream in Itasca County, in the U.S. state of Minnesota.

Split Hand Creek is the English translation of the native Ojibwe-language name; the name has also been translated as "cut hand".

== See also ==
- List of rivers of Minnesota
