= Poppleton Township, Kittson County, Minnesota =

Township in Minnesota, United States

Poppleton Township, Minnesota
- Township
- Location of Poppleton Township, within Kittson County, Minnesota
- Coordinates: 48°50′25″N 96°44′39″W
- Country: United States
- State: Minnesota
- County: Kittson

Area
  - Total: 35.1 sq mi (90.8 km^{2})
  - Land: 35.1 sq mi (90.8 km^{2})
  - Water: 0 sq mi (0.0 km^{2})
- Elevation: 942 ft (287 m)

Population (2020)
  - Total: 133
  - Density: 3.79/sq mi (1.46/km^{2})
- Time zone: UTC-6 (Central (CST))
  - Summer (DST): UTC-5 (CDT)
- FIPS code: 27-52072
- GNIS feature ID: 0665342

Poppleton Township is a township in Kittson County, Minnesota, United States. The population was 133 at the 2020 census.

Poppleton Township was organized in 1893, and named for the numerous poplar trees within its borders.

== Geography ==
According to the United States Census Bureau, the township has a total area of 35.0 square miles (90.8 km^{2}), of which 35.0 square miles (90.8 km^{2}) is land and 0.03% is water.

== Demographics ==
As of the census of 2000, there were 123 people, 52 households, and 39 families residing in the township. The population density was 3.5 people per square mile (1.4/km^{2}). There were 59 housing units at an average density of 1.7/sq mi (0.7/km^{2}). The racial makeup of the township was 99.19% White, and 0.81% from two or more races. Hispanic or Latino of any race were 0.81% of the population.

There were 52 households, out of which 30.8% had children under the age of 18 living with them, 69.2% were married couples living together, 5.8% had a female householder with no husband present, and 23.1% were non-families. 23.1% of all households were made up of individuals, and 5.8% had someone living alone who was 65 years of age or older. The average household size was 2.37 and the average family size was 2.75.

In the township the population was spread out, with 22.8% under the age of 18, 4.1% from 18 to 24, 23.6% from 25 to 44, 29.3% from 45 to 64, and 20.3% who were 65 years of age or older. The median age was 44 years. For every 100 females, there were 136.5 males. For every 100 females age 18 and over, there were 126.2 males.

The median income for a household in the township was $25,357, and the median income for a family was $26,500. Males had a median income of $31,750 versus $11,719 for females. The per capita income for the township was $26,665. There were 18.4% of families and 18.3% of the population living below the poverty line, including 38.9% of under eighteens and 22.7% of those over 64.
