= Kennedy, Minnesota =

City in Minnesota, United States

Kennedy
- City
- Location of Kennedy, Minnesota
- Coordinates: 48°38′33″N 96°54′31″W
- Country: United States
- State: Minnesota
- County: Kittson

Government
  - Mayor: Earl Mattson

Area
  - Total: 0.45 sq mi (1.16 km^{2})
  - Land: 0.45 sq mi (1.16 km^{2})
  - Water: 0 sq mi (0.00 km^{2})
- Elevation: 827 ft (252 m)

Population (2020)
  - Total: 176
  - Density: 393.6/sq mi (151.96/km^{2})
- Time zone: UTC-6 (CST)
  - Summer (DST): UTC-5 (CDT)
- ZIP code: 56733
- Area code: 218
- FIPS code: 27-32732
- GNIS feature ID: 0646089
- Website: kennedymn.org

Kennedy is a city in Kittson County, Minnesota, United States. The population was 176 at the 2020 census.

== History ==
A post office called Kennedy has been in operation since 1881. The city was named for John Stewart Kennedy, a businessman and philanthropist.

== Geography ==
According to the United States Census Bureau, the city has a total area of 0.42 square miles (1.09 km^{2}), all land.

== Demographics ==
Historical population
Census	Pop.	Note	%±
1900	158		—
1910	232		46.8%
1920	311		34.1%
1930	279		−10.3%
1940	338		21.1%
1950	480		42.0%
1960	458		−4.6%
1970	424		−7.4%
1980	405		−4.5%
1990	337		−16.8%
2000	255		−24.3%
2010	193		−24.3%
2020	176		−8.8%
U.S. Decennial Census; 2020 Census

=== 2010 census ===
As of the census of 2010, there were 193 people, 89 households, and 54 families living in the city. The population density was 459.5 inhabitants per square mile (177.4/km^{2}). There were 114 housing units at an average density of 271.4 per square mile (104.8/km^{2}). The racial makeup of the city was 98.4% White, 1.0% Asian, and 0.5% from two or more races. Hispanic or Latino of any race were 4.1% of the population.

There were 89 households, of which 27.0% had children under the age of 18 living with them, 51.7% were married couples living together, 4.5% had a female householder with no husband present, 4.5% had a male householder with no wife present, and 39.3% were non-families. 37.1% of all households were made up of individuals, and 19.1% had someone living alone who was 65 years of age or older. The average household size was 2.17 and the average family size was 2.87.

The median age in the city was 47.4 years. 24.9% of residents were under the age of 18; 4.1% were between the ages of 18 and 24; 17.6% were from 25 to 44; 36.3% were from 45 to 64; and 17.1% were 65 years of age or older. The gender makeup of the city was 48.2% male and 51.8% female.

=== 2000 census ===
As of the census of 2000, there were 255 people, 115 households and 70 families living in the city. The population density was 607.9 inhabitants per square mile (234.7/km^{2}). There were 131 housing units at an average density of 312.3 per square mile (120.6/km^{2}). The racial makeup of the city was 99.61% White, and 0.39% from two or more races. Hispanic or Latino of any race were 6.67% of the population.

There were 115 households, of which 27.0% had children under the age of 18 living with them, 55.7% were married couples living together, 3.5% had a female householder with no husband present, and 39.1% were non-families. 38.3% of all households were made up of individuals, and 13.9% had someone living alone who was 65 years of age or older. The average household size was 2.22 and the average family size was 2.97.

25.5% of the population were under the age of 18, 4.7% from 18 to 24, 25.1% from 25 to 44, 25.1% from 45 to 64, and 19.6% who were 65 years of age or older. The median age was 41 years. For every 100 females, there were 99.2 males. For every 100 females age 18 and over, there were 111.1 males.

The median household income was $33,438 and the median family income was $46,094. Males had a median income of $30,893 versus $19,375 for females. The per capita income for the city was $23,094. About 2.8% of families and 5.9% of the population were below the poverty line, including 13.5% of those under the age of eighteen and 4.2% of those 65 or over.

== Notable people ==
- Odin Langen (1913–1976), U.S. Representative from Minnesota
