= Deerwood Township, Kittson County, Minnesota =

Township in Minnesota, United States

Deerwood Township, Minnesota
- Township
- Location of Deerwood Township, within Kittson County, Minnesota
- Coordinates: 48°35′39″N 96°35′43″W
- Country: United States
- State: Minnesota
- County: Kittson

Area
  - Total: 35.6 sq mi (92.2 km^{2})
  - Land: 35.6 sq mi (92.2 km^{2})
  - Water: 0 sq mi (0.0 km^{2})
- Elevation: 1,007 ft (307 m)

Population (2020)
  - Total: 143
  - Density: 4.02/sq mi (1.55/km^{2})
- Time zone: UTC-6 (Central (CST))
  - Summer (DST): UTC-5 (CDT)
- FIPS code: 27-15382
- GNIS feature ID: 0663952

Deerwood Township is a township in Kittson County, Minnesota, United States. The population was 143 at the 2020 census.

Deerwood Township was organized in 1888, and named for the deer and woodland within its borders.

== Geography ==
According to the United States Census Bureau, the township has a total area of 35.6 square miles (92 km^{2}), all land.

== Demographics ==
As of the census of 2000, there were 186 people, 71 households, and 56 families residing in the township. The population density was 5.2 inhabitants per square mile (2.0/km^{2}). There were 89 housing units at an average density of 2.5 per square mile (0.97/km^{2}). The racial makeup of the township was 98.39% White, 1.08% Asian, and 0.54% from two or more races. Hispanic or Latino of any race were 1.08% of the population.

There were 71 households, out of which 38.0% had children under the age of 18 living with them, 62.0% were married couples living together, 8.5% had a female householder with no husband present, and 21.1% were non-families. 19.7% of all households were made up of individuals, and 9.9% had someone living alone who was 65 years of age or older. The average household size was 2.62 and the average family size was 3.00.

In the township the population was spread out, with 28.0% under the age of 18, 4.8% from 18 to 24, 22.0% from 25 to 44, 27.4% from 45 to 64, and 17.7% who were 65 years of age or older. The median age was 40 years. For every 100 females, there were 118.8 males. For every 100 females age 18 and over, there were 112.7 males.

The median income for a household in the township was $29,167, and the median income for a family was $30,000. Males had a median income of $27,500 versus $20,625 for females. The per capita income for the township was $13,680. About 23.2% of families and 23.6% of the population were below the poverty line, including 31.9% of those under the age of eighteen and 34.3% of those 65 or over.
