= Percy Township, Kittson County, Minnesota =

Township in Minnesota, United States

Percy Township, Minnesota
- Township
- Location of Percy Township, within Kittson County, Minnesota
- Coordinates: 48°43′58″N 96°38′2″W
- Country: United States
- State: Minnesota
- County: Kittson

Area
  - Total: 35.3 sq mi (91.5 km^{2})
  - Land: 34.8 sq mi (90.2 km^{2})
  - Water: 0.46 sq mi (1.2 km^{2})
- Elevation: 991 ft (302 m)

Population (2020)
  - Total: 38
  - Density: 1.1/sq mi (0.42/km^{2})
- Time zone: UTC-6 (Central (CST))
  - Summer (DST): UTC-5 (CDT)
- FIPS code: 27-50452
- GNIS feature ID: 0665283

Percy Township is a township in Kittson County, Minnesota, United States. The population was 38 at the 2020 census.

Percy Township was organized in 1900, and named for Howard Percy, a local pioneer.

== Geography ==
According to the United States Census Bureau, the township has a total area of 35.3 square miles (91.5 km^{2}), of which 34.8 square miles (90.2 km^{2}) is land and 0.5 square mile (1.2 km^{2}) (1.36%) is water.

== Demographics ==
As of the census of 2000, there were 48 people, 24 households, and 13 families residing in the township. The population density was 1.4 people per square mile (0.5/km^{2}). There were 63 housing units at an average density of 1.8/sq mi (0.7/km^{2}). The racial makeup of the township was 100.00% White.

There were 24 households, out of which 16.7% had children under the age of 18 living with them, 54.2% were married couples living together, and 41.7% were non-families. 37.5% of all households were made up of individuals, and 16.7% had someone living alone who was 65 years of age or older. The average household size was 2.00 and the average family size was 2.64.

In the township the population was spread out, with 12.5% under the age of 18, 8.3% from 18 to 24, 22.9% from 25 to 44, 29.2% from 45 to 64, and 27.1% who were 65 years of age or older. The median age was 47 years. For every 100 females, there were 166.7 males. For every 100 females age 18 and over, there were 180.0 males.

The median income for a household in the township was $25,000, and the median income for a family was $48,125. Males had a median income of $27,500 versus $16,250 for females. The per capita income for the township was $17,981. There were no families and 4.8% of the population living below the poverty line, including no under eighteens and none of those over 64.
