= Granville Township, Kittson County, Minnesota =

Township in Minnesota, United States

Granville Township, Minnesota
- Township
- Location of Granville Township, within Kittson County, Minnesota
- Coordinates: 48°51′17″N 96°52′34″W
- Country: United States
- State: Minnesota
- County: Kittson

Area
  - Total: 34.5 sq mi (89.4 km^{2})
  - Land: 34.5 sq mi (89.4 km^{2})
  - Water: 0 sq mi (0.0 km^{2})
- Elevation: 866 ft (264 m)

Population (2020)
  - Total: 65
  - Density: 1.9/sq mi (0.73/km^{2})
- Time zone: UTC-6 (Central (CST))
  - Summer (DST): UTC-5 (CDT)
- FIPS code: 27-25370
- GNIS feature ID: 0664329

Granville Township is a township in Kittson County, Minnesota, United States. The population was 65 at the 2020 census.

Granville Township was organized in 1885.

== Geography ==
According to the United States Census Bureau, the township has a total area of 34.5 square miles (89 km^{2}), of which 34.5 square miles (89 km^{2}) is land and 0.03% is water.

== Demographics ==
As of the census of 2000, there were 104 people, 39 households, and 31 families residing in the township. The population density was 3.0 inhabitants per square mile (1.2/km^{2}). There were 44 housing units at an average density of 1.3 per square mile (0.50/km^{2}). The racial makeup of the township was 97.12% White, 1.92% Asian, and 0.96% from two or more races. Hispanic or Latino of any race were 0.96% of the population.

There were 39 households, out of which 33.3% had children under the age of 18 living with them, 76.9% were married couples living together, 2.6% had a female householder with no husband present, and 20.5% were non-families. 20.5% of all households were made up of individuals, and 12.8% had someone living alone who was 65 years of age or older. The average household size was 2.67 and the average family size was 3.06.

In the township the population was spread out, with 24.0% under the age of 18, 4.8% from 18 to 24, 26.9% from 25 to 44, 25.0% from 45 to 64, and 19.2% who were 65 years of age or older. The median age was 40 years. For every 100 females, there were 100.0 males. For every 100 females age 18 and over, there were 92.7 males.

The median income for a household in the township was $42,292, and the median income for a family was $42,292. Males had a median income of $34,375 versus $17,500 for females. The per capita income for the township was $16,403. There were 12.1% of families and 13.9% of the population living below the poverty line, including 28.6% of under eighteens and none of those over 64.
