= Thompson Township, Kittson County, Minnesota =

Township in Minnesota, United States

Thompson Township, Minnesota
- Township
- Location of Thompson Township, within Kittson County, Minnesota
- Coordinates: 48°45′50″N 96°52′33″W
- Country: United States
- State: Minnesota
- County: Kittson

Area
  - Total: 36.0 sq mi (93.2 km^{2})
  - Land: 36.0 sq mi (93.2 km^{2})
  - Water: 0 sq mi (0.0 km^{2})
- Elevation: 850 ft (259 m)

Population (2020)
  - Total: 137
  - Density: 3.81/sq mi (1.47/km^{2})
- Time zone: UTC-6 (Central (CST))
  - Summer (DST): UTC-5 (CDT)
- FIPS code: 27-64642
- GNIS feature ID: 0665782

Thompson Township is a township in Kittson County, Minnesota, United States. The population was 137 at the 2020 census.

Thompson Township was organized in 1882, and named for three brothers who settled there: William, Robert and George Thompson.

== Geography ==
According to the United States Census Bureau, the township has a total area of 36.0 square miles (93.2 km^{2}), all land.

== Demographics ==
As of the census of 2000, there were 178 people, 69 households, and 54 families residing in the township. The population density was 4.9 people per square mile (1.9/km^{2}). There were 84 housing units at an average density of 2.3/sq mi (0.9/km^{2}). The racial makeup of the township was 100.00% White.

There were 69 households, out of which 34.8% had children under the age of 18 living with them, 75.4% were married couples living together, and 20.3% were non-families. 17.4% of all households were made up of individuals, and 5.8% had someone living alone who was 65 years of age or older. The average household size was 2.58 and the average family size was 2.91.

In the township the population was spread out, with 26.4% under the age of 18, 3.9% from 18 to 24, 25.3% from 25 to 44, 26.4% from 45 to 64, and 18.0% who were 65 years of age or older. The median age was 42 years. For every 100 females, there were 89.4 males. For every 100 females age 18 and over, there were 111.3 males.

The median income for a household in the township was $31,458, and the median income for a family was $34,167. Males had a median income of $31,563 versus $19,583 for females. The per capita income for the township was $15,142. About 10.0% of families and 15.1% of the population were below the poverty line, including 32.7% of those under the age of eighteen and none of those 65 or over.
