= Cannon Township, Kittson County, Minnesota =

Township in Minnesota, United States

Cannon Township, Minnesota
- Township
- Location of Cannon Township, within Kittson County, Minnesota
- Coordinates: 48°49′31″N 96°36′27″W
- Country: United States
- State: Minnesota
- County: Kittson

Area
  - Total: 35.8 sq mi (92.6 km^{2})
  - Land: 35.8 sq mi (92.6 km^{2})
  - Water: 0 sq mi (0.0 km^{2})
- Elevation: 997 ft (304 m)

Population (2020)
  - Total: 18
  - Density: 0.50/sq mi (0.19/km^{2})
- Time zone: UTC-6 (Central (CST))
  - Summer (DST): UTC-5 (CDT)
- FIPS code: 27-09676
- GNIS feature ID: 0663741

Cannon Township is a township in Kittson County, Minnesota, United States. The population was 18 at the 2020 census.

Cannon Township was organized in 1904, and named for Thomas Cannon, a county official.

== Geography ==
According to the United States Census Bureau, the township has a total area of 35.7 square miles (92 km^{2}), all land.

== Demographics ==
As of the census of 2000, there were 22 people, 8 households, and 7 families residing in the township. The population density was 0.6 inhabitants per square mile (0.23/km^{2}). There were 21 housing units at an average density of 0.6 per square mile (0.23/km^{2}). The racial makeup of the township was 95.45% White, and 4.55% from two or more races.

There were 8 households, out of which 37.5% had children under the age of 18 living with them, 75.0% were married couples living together, 12.5% had a female householder with no husband present, and 12.5% were non-families. 12.5% of all households were made up of individuals, and none had someone living alone who was 65 years of age or older. The average household size was 2.75 and the average family size was 3.00.

In the township the population was spread out, with 31.8% under the age of 18, 31.8% from 25 to 44, 9.1% from 45 to 64, and 27.3% who were 65 years of age or older. The median age was 34 years. For every 100 females, there were 120.0 males. For every 100 females age 18 and over, there were 114.3 males.

The median income for a household in the township was $36,250, and the median income for a family was $42,500. Males had a median income of $15,000 versus $18,750 for females. The per capita income for the township was $15,140. There are 16.7% of families living below the poverty line and 13.3% of the population, including no under eighteens and 33.3% of those over 64.

== See also ==
- Cannon Township, Michigan
