= Spring Brook Township, Kittson County, Minnesota =

Township in Minnesota, United States

Spring Brook Township, Minnesota
- Township
- Location of Spring Brook Township, within Kittson County, Minnesota
- Coordinates: 48°35′41″N 96°43′34″W
- Country: United States
- State: Minnesota
- County: Kittson

Area
  - Total: 35.9 sq mi (93.0 km^{2})
  - Land: 35.9 sq mi (93.0 km^{2})
  - Water: 0 sq mi (0.0 km^{2})
- Elevation: 909 ft (277 m)

Population (2020)
  - Total: 49
  - Density: 1.4/sq mi (0.53/km^{2})
- Time zone: UTC-6 (Central (CST))
  - Summer (DST): UTC-5 (CDT)
- FIPS code: 27-61744
- GNIS feature ID: 0665666

Spring Brook Township is a township in Kittson County, Minnesota, United States. The population was 49 at the 2020 census.

Spring Brook Township was organized in 1884.

== Geography ==
According to the United States Census Bureau, the township has a total area of 35.9 square miles (93.1 km^{2}), of which 35.9 square miles (93.0 km^{2}) is land and 0.03% is water.

== Demographics ==
As of the census of 2000, there were 74 people, 26 households, and 21 families residing in the township. The population density was 2.1 people per square mile (0.8/km^{2}). There were 32 housing units at an average density of 0.9/sq mi (0.3/km^{2}). The racial makeup of the township was 97.30% White, and 2.70% from two or more races.

There were 26 households, out of which 30.8% had children under the age of 18 living with them, 84.6% were married couples living together, and 15.4% were non-families. 11.5% of all households were made up of individuals, and 7.7% had someone living alone who was 65 years of age or older. The average household size was 2.85 and the average family size was 3.09.

In the township the population was spread out, with 24.3% under the age of 18, 9.5% from 18 to 24, 17.6% from 25 to 44, 29.7% from 45 to 64, and 18.9% who were 65 years of age or older. The median age was 44 years. For every 100 females, there were 85.0 males. For every 100 females age 18 and over, there were 115.4 males.

The median income for a household in the township was $36,875, and the median income for a family was $45,625. Males had a median income of $35,000 versus $28,750 for females. The per capita income for the township was $13,637. There were 9.5% of families and 7.5% of the population living below the poverty line, including no under eighteens and none of those over 64.
