= Hallock Township, Kittson County, Minnesota =

Township in Minnesota, United States

Hallock Township, Minnesota
- Township
- Location of Hallock Township, within Kittson County, Minnesota
- Coordinates: 48°45′34″N 96°59′9″W
- Country: United States
- State: Minnesota
- County: Kittson

Area
  - Total: 33.9 sq mi (87.9 km^{2})
  - Land: 33.9 sq mi (87.9 km^{2})
  - Water: 0 sq mi (0.0 km^{2})
- Elevation: 807 ft (246 m)

Population (2020)
  - Total: 84
  - Density: 2.5/sq mi (0.96/km^{2})
- Time zone: UTC-6 (Central (CST))
  - Summer (DST): UTC-5 (CDT)
- ZIP codes: 56728, 56740, 56755
- Area code: 218
- FIPS code: 27-26594
- GNIS feature ID: 0664373

Hallock Township is a township in Kittson County, Minnesota, United States. The population was 84 at the 2020 census.

Hallock Township was organized in 1880, and named for Charles Hallock, an American writer.

== Geography ==
According to the United States Census Bureau, the township has a total area of 33.9 square miles (88 km^{2}), all land.

== Demographics ==
As of the census of 2000, there were 108 people, 34 households, and 33 families residing in the township. The population density was 3.2 inhabitants per square mile (1.2/km^{2}). There were 42 housing units at an average density of 1.2 per square mile (0.46/km^{2}). The racial makeup of the township was 95.37% White, 3.70% from other races, and 0.93% from two or more races. Hispanic or Latino of any race were 4.63% of the population.

There were 34 households, out of which 47.1% had children under the age of 18 living with them, 85.3% were married couples living together, 5.9% had a female householder with no husband present, and 2.9% were non-families. 2.9% of all households were made up of individuals, and 2.9% had someone living alone who was 65 years of age or older. The average household size was 3.18 and the average family size was 3.15.

In the township the population was spread out, with 35.2% under the age of 18, 2.8% from 18 to 24, 25.9% from 25 to 44, 20.4% from 45 to 64, and 15.7% who were 65 years of age or older. The median age was 37 years. For every 100 females, there were 100.0 males. For every 100 females age 18 and over, there were 100.0 males.

The median income for a household in the township was $45,000, and the median income for a family was $45,000. Males had a median income of $31,750 versus $23,125 for females. The per capita income for the township was $20,834. None of the population and none of the families were below the poverty line.
