= Humboldt, Minnesota =

City in Minnesota, United States

Humboldt
- City
- Location of Humboldt, Minnesota
- Coordinates: 48°55′17″N 97°5′41″W
- Country: United States
- State: Minnesota
- County: Kittson

Area
  - Total: 0.11 sq mi (0.29 km^{2})
  - Land: 0.11 sq mi (0.29 km^{2})
  - Water: 0 sq mi (0.00 km^{2})
- Elevation: 797 ft (243 m)

Population (2020)
  - Total: 41
  - Density: 368.7/sq mi (142.37/km^{2})
- Time zone: UTC-6 (CST)
  - Summer (DST): UTC-5 (CDT)
- ZIP code: 56731
- Area code: 218
- FIPS code: 27-30446
- GNIS feature ID: 0645281

Humboldt is a city in Kittson County, Minnesota, United States. The population was 41 at the 2020 census.

== History ==
A post office called Humboldt has been in operation since 1896. The city is reportedly named after Alexander von Humboldt, who was actively exploring in the Americas and later operating as a diplomat (and therefore his exploits were widely published) over the period 1797–1858.

== Geography ==
According to the United States Census Bureau, the city has a total area of 0.11 square miles (0.28 km^{2}), all land.

U.S. Route 75 serves as a main route in the community.

== Demographics ==
Historical population
Census	Pop.	Note	%±
1920	198		—
1930	139		−29.8%
1940	139		0.0%
1950	143		2.9%
1960	169		18.2%
1970	112		−33.7%
1980	111		−0.9%
1990	74		−33.3%
2000	61		−17.6%
2010	45		−26.2%
2020	41		−8.9%
U.S. Decennial Census; 2020 Census

=== 2010 census ===
As of the census of 2010, there were 45 people, 20 households, and 16 families living in the city. The population density was 409.1 inhabitants per square mile (158.0/km^{2}). There were 26 housing units at an average density of 236.4 per square mile (91.3/km^{2}). The racial makeup of the city was 91.1% White and 8.9% from other races. Hispanic or Latino of any race were 13.3% of the population.

There were 20 households, of which 15.0% had children under the age of 18 living with them, 80.0% were married couples living together, and 20.0% were non-families. 20.0% of all households were made up of individuals, and 5% had someone living alone who was 65 years of age or older. The average household size was 2.25 and the average family size was 2.56.

The median age in the city was 48.5 years. 11.1% of residents were under the age of 18; 6.6% were between the ages of 18 and 24; 17.7% were from 25 to 44; 46.8% were from 45 to 64; and 17.8% were 65 years of age or older. The gender makeup of the city was 55.6% male and 44.4% female.

=== 2000 census ===
As of the census of 2000, there were 61 people, 25 households, and 17 families living in the city. The population density was 579.7 inhabitants per square mile (223.8/km^{2}). There were 38 housing units at an average density of 361.1 per square mile (139.4/km^{2}). The racial makeup of the city was 100.00% White.

There were 25 households, out of which 44.0% had children under the age of 18 living with them, 64.0% were married couples living together, 4.0% had a female householder with no husband present, and 32.0% were non-families. 28.0% of all households were made up of individuals, and 8.0% had someone living alone who was 65 years of age or older. The average household size was 2.44 and the average family size was 3.06.

In the city, the population was spread out, with 24.6% under the age of 18, 6.6% from 18 to 24, 34.4% from 25 to 44, 26.2% from 45 to 64, and 8.2% who were 65 years of age or older. The median age was 35 years. For every 100 females, there were 144.0 males. For every 100 females age 18 and over, there were 130.0 males.

The median income for a household in the city was $53,125, and the median income for a family was $58,125. Males had a median income of $34,583 versus $25,417 for females. The per capita income for the city was $18,511. None of the population or the families were below the poverty line.

== Notable person ==
Saxophonist Maury Finney is a native of Humboldt.
