= Clow Township, Kittson County, Minnesota =

Township in Minnesota, United States

Clow Township, Minnesota
- Township
- Location of Clow Township, within Kittson County, Minnesota
- Coordinates: 48°56′25″N 96°59′29″W
- Country: United States
- State: Minnesota
- County: Kittson

Area
  - Total: 45.6 sq mi (118.0 km^{2})
  - Land: 45.5 sq mi (117.9 km^{2})
  - Water: 0.039 sq mi (0.1 km^{2})
- Elevation: 801 ft (244 m)

Population (2020)
  - Total: 33
  - Density: 0.72/sq mi (0.28/km^{2})
- Time zone: UTC-6 (Central (CST))
  - Summer (DST): UTC-5 (CDT)
- FIPS code: 27-12340
- GNIS feature ID: 0663839

Clow Township is a township in Kittson County, Minnesota, United States. The population was 33 at the 2020 census.

Clow Township bears the surname of two early settlers.

== Geography ==
According to the United States Census Bureau, the township has a total area of 45.5 square miles (118 km^{2}), of which 45.5 square miles (118 km^{2}) is land and 0.04 square miles (0.10 km^{2}) (0.09%) is water.

== Demographics ==
As of the census of 2000, there were 37 people, 14 households, and 11 families residing in the township. The population density was 0.8 inhabitants per square mile (0.31/km^{2}). There were 21 housing units at an average density of 0.5 per square mile (0.19/km^{2}). The racial makeup of the township was 97.30% White and 2.70% Asian. Hispanic or Latino of any race were 5.41% of the population.

There were 14 households, out of which 35.7% had children under the age of 18 living with them, 64.3% were married couples living together, 7.1% had a female householder with no husband present, and 21.4% were non-families. 14.3% of all households were made up of individuals, and 7.1% had someone living alone who was 65 years of age or older. The average household size was 2.64 and the average family size was 3.00.

In the township the population was spread out, with 29.7% under the age of 18, 2.7% from 18 to 24, 10.8% from 25 to 44, 35.1% from 45 to 64, and 21.6% who were 65 years of age or older. The median age was 48 years. For every 100 females, there were 94.7 males. For every 100 females age 18 and over, there were 136.4 males

The median income for a household in the township was $32,083, and the median income for a family was $32,083. Males had a median income of $22,083 versus $26,250 for females. The per capita income for the township was $15,044. There were no families and 4.2% of the population living below the poverty line, including no under eighteens and none of those over 64.
