= Hampden Township, Kittson County, Minnesota =

Township in Minnesota, United States

Hampden Township, Minnesota
- Township
- Location of Hampden Township, within Kittson County, Minnesota
- Coordinates: 48°50′52″N 97°0′1″W
- Country: United States
- State: Minnesota
- County: Kittson

Area
  - Total: 36.0 sq mi (93.2 km^{2})
  - Land: 36.0 sq mi (93.2 km^{2})
  - Water: 0 sq mi (0.0 km^{2})
- Elevation: 797 ft (243 m)

Population (2020)
  - Total: 29
  - Density: 0.81/sq mi (0.31/km^{2})
- Time zone: UTC-6 (Central (CST))
  - Summer (DST): UTC-5 (CDT)
- FIPS code: 27-26846
- GNIS feature ID: 0664384

Hampden Township is a township in Kittson County, Minnesota, United States. The population was 29 at the 2020 census.

Hampden Township was organized in 1879, and named for John Hampden, an English politician.

== Geography ==
According to the United States Census Bureau, the township has a total area of 36.0 square miles (93 km^{2}), all land.

== Demographics ==
As of the census of 2000, there were 51 people, 21 households, and 14 families residing in the township. The population density was 1.4 inhabitants per square mile (0.54/km^{2}). There were 26 housing units at an average density of 0.7 per square mile (0.27/km^{2}). The racial makeup of the township was 100.00% White.

There were 21 households, out of which 42.9% had children under the age of 18 living with them, 66.7% were married couples living together, 4.8% had a female householder with no husband present, and 28.6% were non-families. 28.6% of all households were made up of individuals, and 19.0% had someone living alone who was 65 years of age or older. The average household size was 2.43 and the average family size was 3.00.

In the township the population was spread out, with 29.4% under the age of 18, 2.0% from 18 to 24, 33.3% from 25 to 44, 19.6% from 45 to 64, and 15.7% who were 65 years of age or older. The median age was 37 years. For every 100 females, there were 112.5 males. For every 100 females age 18 and over, there were 100.0 males.

The median income for a household in the township was $49,375, and the median income for a family was $66,250. Males had a median income of $32,000 versus $28,750 for females. The per capita income for the township was $28,822. None of the population and none of the families were below the poverty line.
