= Arveson Township, Kittson County, Minnesota =

Township in Minnesota, United States

Arveson Township, Minnesota
- Township
- Location of Arveson Township, within Kittson County, Minnesota
- Coordinates: 48°35′13″N 96°28′14″W
- Country: United States
- State: Minnesota
- County: Kittson

Area
  - Total: 34.6 sq mi (89.6 km^{2})
  - Land: 31.3 sq mi (81.1 km^{2})
  - Water: 3.3 sq mi (8.5 km^{2})
- Elevation: 1,063 ft (324 m)

Population (2020)
  - Total: 100
  - Density: 3.2/sq mi (1.2/km^{2})
- Time zone: UTC-6 (Central (CST))
  - Summer (DST): UTC-5 (CDT)
- FIPS code: 27-02386
- GNIS feature ID: 0663464

Arveson Township is a township in Kittson County, Minnesota, United States. The population was 100 at the 2020 census.

Arveson Township was organized in 1902, and named for Arve Arveson, a county commissioner.

== Geography ==
According to the United States Census Bureau, the township has a total area of 34.6 square miles (90 km^{2}), of which 31.3 square miles (81 km^{2}) is land and 3.3 square miles (8.5 km^{2}) (9.54%) is water.

== Demographics ==
As of the census of 2000, there were 100 people, 33 households, and 27 families residing in the township. The population density was 3.2 inhabitants per square mile (1.2/km^{2}). There were 41 housing units at an average density of 1.3 per square mile (0.50/km^{2}). The racial makeup of the township was 99.00% White and 1.00% Native American.

There were 33 households, out of which 42.4% had children under the age of 18 living with them, 78.8% were married couples living together, 3.0% had a female householder with no husband present, and 15.2% were non-families. 9.1% of all households were made up of individuals, and 9.1% had someone living alone who was 65 years of age or older. The average household size was 3.03 and the average family size was 3.25.

In the township the population was spread out, with 32.0% under the age of 18, 5.0% from 18 to 24, 18.0% from 25 to 44, 28.0% from 45 to 64, and 17.0% who were 65 years of age or older. The median age was 40 years. For every 100 females, there were 122.2 males. For every 100 females age 18 and over, there were 112.5 males.

The median income for a household in the township was $27,188, and the median income for a family was $28,750. Males had a median income of $23,438 versus $21,250 for females. The per capita income for the township was $12,535. There were 23.1% of families and 25.3% of the population living below the poverty line, including 31.3% of under eighteens and 23.8% of those over 64.
