= South Red River Township, Kittson County, Minnesota =

Township in Minnesota, United States

South Red River Township, Minnesota
- Township
- Location of South Red River Township, within Kittson County, Minnesota
- Coordinates: 48°40′8″N 97°4′24″W
- Country: United States
- State: Minnesota
- County: Kittson

Area
  - Total: 17.8 sq mi (46.1 km^{2})
  - Land: 17.6 sq mi (45.5 km^{2})
  - Water: 0.23 sq mi (0.6 km^{2})
- Elevation: 794 ft (242 m)

Population (2020)
  - Total: 20
  - Density: 1.1/sq mi (0.44/km^{2})
- Time zone: UTC-6 (Central (CST))
  - Summer (DST): UTC-5 (CDT)
- FIPS code: 27-61456
- GNIS feature ID: 0665655

South Red River Township is a township in Kittson County, Minnesota, United States. The population was 20 at the 2020 census.

== Geography ==
According to the United States Census Bureau, the township has a total area of 17.8 square miles (46.1 km^{2}), of which 17.6 square miles (45.5 km^{2}) is land and 0.2 square mile (0.6 km^{2}) (1.35%) is water.

== Demographics ==
As of the census of 2000, there were 23 people, 8 households, and 7 families residing in the township. The population density was 1.3 people per square mile (0.5/km^{2}). There were 11 housing units at an average density of 0.6/sq mi (0.2/km^{2}). The racial makeup of the township was 100.00% White.

There were 8 households, out of which 37.5% had children under the age of 18 living with them, 87.5% were married couples living together, and 12.5% were non-families. 12.5% of all households were made up of individuals, and none had someone living alone who was 65 years of age or older. The average household size was 2.88 and the average family size was 3.14.

In the township the population was spread out, with 34.8% under the age of 18, 30.4% from 25 to 44, 26.1% from 45 to 64, and 8.7% who were 65 years of age or older. The median age was 30 years. For every 100 females, there were 76.9 males. For every 100 females age 18 and over, there were 114.3 males.

The median income for a household in the township was $41,875, and the median income for a family was $41,875. Males had a median income of $25,000 versus $0 for females. The per capita income for the township was $27,633. None of the population or the families were below the poverty line.
