= Pelan Township, Kittson County, Minnesota =

Township in Minnesota, United States

Pelan Township, Minnesota
- Township
- Location of Pelan Township, within Kittson County, Minnesota
- Coordinates: 48°40′8″N 96°24′50″W
- Country: United States
- State: Minnesota
- County: Kittson

Area
  - Total: 35.6 sq mi (92.3 km^{2})
  - Land: 35.6 sq mi (92.3 km^{2})
  - Water: 0 sq mi (0.0 km^{2})
- Elevation: 1,027 ft (313 m)

Population (2020)
  - Total: 46
  - Density: 1.3/sq mi (0.50/km^{2})
- Time zone: UTC-6 (Central (CST))
  - Summer (DST): UTC-5 (CDT)
- FIPS code: 27-50074
- GNIS feature ID: 0665269

Pelan Township is a township in Kittson County, Minnesota, United States. The population was 46 at the 2020 census.

Pelan Township was organized in 1900, and named for Charles H. Pelan, an early settler.

== Geography ==
According to the United States Census Bureau, the township has a total area of 35.6 square miles (92.3 km^{2}), all land.

== Demographics ==
As of the census of 2000, there were 61 people, 25 households, and 19 families residing in the township. The population density was 1.7 people per square mile (0.7/km^{2}). There were 35 housing units at an average density of 1.0/sq mi (0.4/km^{2}). The racial makeup of the township was 93.44% White, 1.64% Native American, 1.64% Asian, 3.28% from other races. Hispanic or Latino of any race were 3.28% of the population.

There were 25 households, out of which 24.0% had children under the age of 18 living with them, 60.0% were married couples living together, 12.0% had a female householder with no husband present, and 24.0% were non-families. 20.0% of all households were made up of individuals, and 12.0% had someone living alone who was 65 years of age or older. The average household size was 2.44 and the average family size was 2.74.

In the township the population was spread out, with 18.0% under the age of 18, 11.5% from 18 to 24, 26.2% from 25 to 44, 34.4% from 45 to 64, and 9.8% who were 65 years of age or older. The median age was 42 years. For every 100 females, there were 90.6 males. For every 100 females age 18 and over, there were 100.0 males.

The median income for a household in the township was $37,250, and the median income for a family was $41,250. Males had a median income of $25,833 versus $22,500 for females. The per capita income for the township was $19,616. None of the population or the families were below the poverty line.
