= Hazelton Township, Kittson County, Minnesota =

Township in Minnesota, United States

Hazelton Township, Minnesota
- Township
- Location of Hazelton Township, within Kittson County, Minnesota
- Coordinates: 48°46′4″N 96°43′40″W
- Country: United States
- State: Minnesota
- County: Kittson

Area
  - Total: 36.0 sq mi (93.2 km^{2})
  - Land: 36.0 sq mi (93.2 km^{2})
  - Water: 0 sq mi (0.0 km^{2})
- Elevation: 920 ft (280 m)

Population (2020)
  - Total: 100
  - Density: 2.8/sq mi (1.1/km^{2})
- Time zone: UTC-6 (Central (CST))
  - Summer (DST): UTC-5 (CDT)
- FIPS code: 27-28070
- GNIS feature ID: 0664433

Hazelton Township is a township in Kittson County, Minnesota, United States. The population was 100 at the 2020 census.

Hazelton Township was organized in 1888, and named for the abundant hazel bushes within its borders.

== Geography ==
According to the United States Census Bureau, the township has a total area of 36.0 square miles (93 km^{2}), all land.

== Demographics ==
As of the census of 2000, there were 99 people, 43 households, and 26 families residing in the township. The population density was 2.8 inhabitants per square mile (1.1/km^{2}). There were 56 housing units at an average density of 1.6 per square mile (0.62/km^{2}). The racial makeup of the township was 100.00% White. Hispanic or Latino of any race were 2.02% of the population.

There were 43 households, out of which 27.9% had children under the age of 18 living with them, 53.5% were married couples living together, 2.3% had a female householder with no husband present, and 39.5% were non-families. 32.6% of all households were made up of individuals, and 9.3% had someone living alone who was 65 years of age or older. The average household size was 2.30 and the average family size was 2.81.

In the township the population was spread out, with 24.2% under the age of 18, 6.1% from 18 to 24, 28.3% from 25 to 44, 25.3% from 45 to 64, and 16.2% who were 65 years of age or older. The median age was 40 years. For every 100 females, there were 135.7 males. For every 100 females age 18 and over, there were 120.6 males.

The median income for a household in the township was $37,188, and the median income for a family was $40,833. Males had a median income of $36,250 versus $21,250 for females. The per capita income for the township was $18,658. None of the population or the families were below the poverty line.
