= Spruce Township =

Spruce Township may refer to the following townships in the United States:

- Spruce Township, Bates County, Missouri
- Spruce Township, Roseau County, Minnesota

== See also ==
- Spruce Creek Township, Pennsylvania
- Spruce Grove Township, Minnesota (disambiguation)
- Spruce Hill Township (disambiguation)
- Spruce Valley Township, Marshall County, Minnesota
