= Thief River =

- Mouth of the Thief River
- Native name: Gimood-akiwi ziibi (Ojibwe)

Location
- Country: United States
- State: Minnesota
- Counties: Pennington and Marshall counties

Physical characteristics
- Source
  - location: Thief Lake, Marshall County, Minnesota
  - coordinates: 48.488305°N 95.9500073°W
- Mouth
  - location: Thief River Falls, Pennington County, Minnesota
  - coordinates: 48.1243°N 96.1695°W
- Length: 40.3 mi-long (64.9 km)

Basin features
- River system: Hudson Bay

The Thief River is a 40.3-mile-long (64.9 km) tributary of the Red Lake River in northwestern Minnesota in the United States. Via the Red Lake River, the Red River of the North, Lake Winnipeg and the Nelson River, it is part of the watershed of Hudson Bay.

== Course ==
The Thief River flows from Thief Lake in Thief Lake Township of northeastern Marshall County and flows generally south-southwestwardly to Thief River Falls in northwestern Pennington County. The river flows through the Agassiz National Wildlife Refuge.

== Tributaries ==
Thief Lake collects the Moose River, and the Thief River collects the Mud River in the Agassiz Refuge.

== Name ==
Thief River Falls takes its name from a geographic feature, the falls of the Red Lake River at its confluence with the Thief River. The name of the river is a loose translation of the Ojibwe phrase, Gimood-akiwi ziibi, literally, the "Stolen-land river" or "Thieving Land river," which originated when a band of Dakota Indians occupied a secret encampment along the river, hence "stealing" the land, before being discovered and routed by the neighboring Ojibwe.

== See also ==
- List of rivers of Minnesota
- List of longest streams of Minnesota
