= Gatzke, Minnesota =

- Unincorporated community
- Location within Minnesota Location within the United States
- Coordinates: 48°25′28″N 95°47′03″W
- Country: United States
- State: Minnesota
- County: Marshall
- Township: Rollis
- Elevation: 1,181 ft (360 m)
- Time zone: UTC-6 (Central (CST))
  - Summer (DST): UTC-5 (CDT)
- ZIP code: 56724
- Area code: 218
- GNIS feature ID: 644058

Gatzke (also Gatzki) is an unincorporated community in Rollis Township, Marshall County, Minnesota, United States.

The community is located east of Middle River and northwest of Grygla. Marshall County State-Aid Highway 6 serves as a main route in the community. Agassiz National Wildlife Refuge is nearby. State Highway 89 is also nearby. Gatzke is located within ZIP code 56724.
