= Holt Township, Minnesota =

Holt Township is the name of some places in the U.S. state of Minnesota:

- Holt Township, Fillmore County, Minnesota
- Holt Township, Marshall County, Minnesota

== See also ==
- Holt Township (disambiguation)
