= Valley Township, Marshall County, Minnesota =

Valley Township, Minnesota
- Township
- Location of Valley Township, within Marshall County, Minnesota
- Coordinates: 48°19′25″N 95°40′8″W
- Country: United States
- State: Minnesota
- County: Marshall

Area
  - Total: 33.9 sq mi (87.9 km^{2})
  - Land: 33.9 sq mi (87.9 km^{2})
  - Water: 0 sq mi (0.0 km^{2})
- Elevation: 1,171 ft (357 m)

Population (2020)
  - Total: 135
  - Density: 3.98/sq mi (1.54/km^{2})
- Time zone: UTC-6 (Central (CST))
  - Summer (DST): UTC-5 (CDT)
- FIPS code: 27-66514
- GNIS feature ID: 0665850

Valley Township is a township in Marshall County, Minnesota, United States. The population was 135 at the 2020 census.

Valley Township was organized in 1900, and named for the valley of the Mud River.

== Geography ==
According to the United States Census Bureau, the township has a total area of 33.9 square miles (87.9 km^{2}), all land.

== Demographics ==
As of the census of 2000, there were 164 people, 64 households, and 51 families residing in the township. The population density was 4.8 people per square mile (1.9/km^{2}). There were 68 housing units at an average density of 2.0/sq mi (0.8/km^{2}). The racial makeup of the township was 97.56% White and 2.44% Asian.

There were 64 households, out of which 29.7% had children under the age of 18 living with them, 68.8% were married couples living together, 3.1% had a female householder with no husband present, and 20.3% were non-families. 18.8% of all households were made up of individuals, and 12.5% had someone living alone who was 65 years of age or older. The average household size was 2.56 and the average family size was 2.88.

In the township the population was spread out, with 26.2% under the age of 18, 4.9% from 18 to 24, 21.3% from 25 to 44, 25.0% from 45 to 64, and 22.6% who were 65 years of age or older. The median age was 44 years. For every 100 females, there were 95.2 males. For every 100 females age 18 and over, there were 98.4 males.

The median income for a household in the township was $33,125, and the median income for a family was $30,625. Males had a median income of $26,667 versus $21,389 for females. The per capita income for the township was $14,634. About 4.1% of families and 4.0% of the population were below the poverty line, including none of those under the age of eighteen and 17.6% of those 65 or over.
