= Rollis =

Rollis may refer to:

- Christopher J. Rollis (1858–1930), American newspaper editor and politician
- Robert Rollis (1921–2007), French actor
- Rollis Township, Marshall County, Minnesota, United States
