= Rosewood, Minnesota =

- Unincorporated community
- Location within Minnesota Location within the United States
- Coordinates: 48°11′22″N 96°17′25″W
- Country: United States
- State: Minnesota
- County: Marshall
- Township: New Solum
- Elevation: 1,135 ft (346 m)
- Time zone: UTC-6 (Central (CST))
  - Summer (DST): UTC-5 (CDT)
- Area code: 218
- GNIS feature ID: 650302

Rosewood is an unincorporated community in Marshall County, Minnesota, United States.
