= March, Minnesota =

- Unincorporated community
- Location within Minnesota Location within the United States
- Coordinates: 48°11′42″N 96°53′50″W
- Country: United States
- State: Minnesota
- County: Marshall
- Township: Vega
- Elevation: 823 ft (251 m)
- Time zone: UTC-6 (Central (CST))
  - Summer (DST): UTC-5 (CDT)
- Area code: 218
- GNIS feature ID: 654819

March is an unincorporated community in Marshall County, Minnesota, United States. March was originally a grain elevator area that became a small, unincorporated community.
