= Espelie, Minnesota =

- Unincorporated community
- Location within Minnesota Location within the United States
- Coordinates: 48°13′25″N 95°40′49″W
- Country: United States
- State: Minnesota
- County: Marshall
- Township: Espelie
- Elevation: 1,178 ft (359 m)
- Time zone: UTC-6 (Central (CST))
  - Summer (DST): UTC-5 (CDT)
- Area code: 218
- GNIS feature ID: 654696

Espelie is an unincorporated community in Marshall County, Minnesota, United States.
