= Big Woods, Minnesota =

- Unincorporated community
- Location within Minnesota Location within the United States
- Coordinates: 48°18′41″N 97°06′29″W
- Country: United States
- State: Minnesota
- County: Marshall
- Township: Big Woods
- Elevation: 797 ft (243 m)
- Time zone: UTC-6 (Central (CST))
  - Summer (DST): UTC-5 (CDT)
- Area code: 218
- GNIS feature ID: 654605

Big Woods is an unincorporated community in Marshall County, Minnesota, United States.
