= Thief Lake =

Lake in the state of Minnesota, United States

- Location within Minnesota
- Location: Marshall County, Minnesota
- Coordinates: 48°29′19″N 95°53′57″W
- Type: lake
- Surface area: 181 acres (73 ha)
- Max. depth: 7 feet (2.1 m)
- References: https://usa.fishermap.org/depth-map/thief-lake-mn/

Thief Lake is a lake in Marshall County, in the U.S. state of Minnesota. Minnesota’s Department of Natural Resources maintains the lake with goals of managing the waterfowl and elk populations but is not part of the state's Sentinel Lakes Program. The lake gives its name to the township that it stands on, Thief Lake Township. The lake is linked to the Red Lake River via Thief River. The two rivers meet at Thief River Falls. The lake's water level is controlled by a dam which whose construction started in 1930 and finished in 1931.

The area is designated as a Wildlife management area. Studies on population density starting as early as 1957 and as late as 2004 show a decrease in the lake's observed population of muskrat, scaup, and scud. The same studies show an increase in the lake's Ringneck duck harvest. The only water access site is a dock on the Northwest side of the lake.

== See also ==
- List of lakes in Minnesota
