= Eagle Point Township =

Eagle Point Township may refer to the following townships in the United States:

- Eagle Point Township, Ogle County, Illinois
- Eagle Point Township, Marshall County, Minnesota
