= Oak Park Township =

Oak Park Township may refer to the following townships in the United States:

- Oak Park Township, Cook County, Illinois
- Oak Park Township, Marshall County, Minnesota
