= Bloomer Township =

Bloomer Township may refer to:

- Bloomer Township, Michigan
- Bloomer Township, Minnesota
