= Englund, Minnesota =

- Unincorporated community
- Location within Minnesota Location within the United States
- Coordinates: 48°29′09″N 96°37′41″W
- Country: United States
- State: Minnesota
- County: Marshall
- Township: Nelson Park
- Elevation: 971 ft (296 m)
- Time zone: UTC-6 (Central (CST))
  - Summer (DST): UTC-5 (CDT)
- Area code: 218
- GNIS feature ID: 654693

Englund is an unincorporated community in Marshall County, Minnesota, United States.
