= Tamarac Township, Marshall County, Minnesota =

Tamarac Township, Minnesota
- Township
- Location of Tamarac Township, within Marshall County, Minnesota
- Coordinates: 48°24′56″N 96°51′48″W
- Country: United States
- State: Minnesota
- County: Marshall

Area
  - Total: 35.3 sq mi (91.4 km^{2})
  - Land: 35.3 sq mi (91.4 km^{2})
  - Water: 0 sq mi (0.0 km^{2})
- Elevation: 837 ft (255 m)

Population (2020)
  - Total: 72
  - Density: 2.0/sq mi (0.79/km^{2})
- Time zone: UTC-6 (Central (CST))
  - Summer (DST): UTC-5 (CDT)
- FIPS code: 27-64138
- GNIS feature ID: 0665759

Tamarac Township is a township in Marshall County, Minnesota, United States. The population was 72 at the 2020 census.

Tamarac River was organized in 1879, and named for the Tamarac River.

== Geography ==
According to the United States Census Bureau, the township has a total area of 35.3 square miles (91.4 km^{2}), all land.

== Demographics ==
As of the census of 2000, there were 94 people, 35 households, and 26 families residing in the township. The population density was 2.7 people per square mile (1.0/km^{2}). There were 42 housing units at an average density of 1.2/sq mi (0.5/km^{2}). The racial makeup of the township was 98.94% White and 1.06% African American.

There were 35 households, out of which 34.3% had children under the age of 18 living with them, 71.4% were married couples living together, 2.9% had a female householder with no husband present, and 22.9% were non-families. 20.0% of all households were made up of individuals, and 2.9% had someone living alone who was 65 years of age or older. The average household size was 2.69 and the average family size was 3.07.

In the township the population was spread out, with 29.8% under the age of 18, 3.2% from 18 to 24, 24.5% from 25 to 44, 34.0% from 45 to 64, and 8.5% who were 65 years of age or older. The median age was 41 years. For every 100 females, there were 113.6 males. For every 100 females age 18 and over, there were 120.0 males.

The median income for a household in the township was $55,000, and the median income for a family was $58,438. Males had a median income of $31,250 versus $27,917 for females. The per capita income for the township was $21,411. There were 8.7% of families and 6.9% of the population living below the poverty line, including no under eighteens and none of those over 64.
