= Luna, Minnesota =

- Unincorporated community
- Location within Minnesota Location within the United States
- Coordinates: 48°15′13″N 96°47′37″W
- Country: United States
- State: Minnesota
- County: Marshall
- Township: Warrenton
- Elevation: 853 ft (260 m)
- Time zone: UTC-6 (Central (CST))
  - Summer (DST): UTC-5 (CDT)
- Area code: 218
- GNIS feature ID: 654807

Luna is an unincorporated community in southern Marshall County, Minnesota, United States.

The community lies approximately four miles north of Warren along U.S. Route 75.
