= Wanger Township, Marshall County, Minnesota =

Wanger Township, Minnesota
- Township
- Location of Wanger Township, within Marshall County, Minnesota
- Coordinates: 48°24′34″N 96°43′39″W
- Country: United States
- State: Minnesota
- County: Marshall

Area
  - Total: 36.1 sq mi (93.4 km^{2})
  - Land: 36.0 sq mi (93.3 km^{2})
  - Water: 0.039 sq mi (0.1 km^{2})
- Elevation: 890 ft (270 m)

Population (2020)
  - Total: 73
  - Density: 2.0/sq mi (0.78/km^{2})
- Time zone: UTC-6 (Central (CST))
  - Summer (DST): UTC-5 (CDT)
- FIPS code: 27-68044
- GNIS feature ID: 0665913

Wanger Township is a township in Marshall County, Minnesota, United States. The population was 73 at the 2020 census.

Wanger Township was organized in 1882, and named for a pioneer settler.

== Geography ==
According to the United States Census Bureau, the township has a total area of 36.0 square miles (93.4 km^{2}), of which 36.0 square miles (93.3 km^{2}) is land and 0.04 square mile (0.1 km^{2}) (0.11%) is water.

== Demographics ==
As of the census of 2000, there were 95 people, 42 households, and 25 families residing in the township. The population density was 2.6 people per square mile (1.0/km^{2}). There were 46 housing units at an average density of 1.3/sq mi (0.5/km^{2}). The racial makeup of the township was 98.95% White, and 1.05% from two or more races. Hispanic or Latino of any race were 8.42% of the population.

There were 42 households, out of which 26.2% had children under the age of 18 living with them, 59.5% were married couples living together, and 38.1% were non-families. 38.1% of all households were made up of individuals, and 16.7% had someone living alone who was 65 years of age or older. The average household size was 2.26 and the average family size was 3.04.

In the township the population was spread out, with 22.1% under the age of 18, 6.3% from 18 to 24, 24.2% from 25 to 44, 23.2% from 45 to 64, and 24.2% who were 65 years of age or older. The median age was 42 years. For every 100 females, there were 111.1 males. For every 100 females age 18 and over, there were 117.6 males.

The median income for a household in the township was $28,750, and the median income for a family was $34,750. Males had a median income of $60,625 versus $18,750 for females. The per capita income for the township was $14,143. There were 18.5% of families and 17.3% of the population living below the poverty line, including 11.5% of under eighteens and 18.5% of those over 64.
