= Foldahl Township, Marshall County, Minnesota =

Foldahl Township, Minnesota
- Township
- Location of Foldahl Township, within Marshall County, Minnesota
- Coordinates: 48°19′27″N 96°34′40″W
- Country: United States
- State: Minnesota
- County: Marshall

Area
  - Total: 36.3 sq mi (94.0 km^{2})
  - Land: 36.3 sq mi (94.0 km^{2})
  - Water: 0 sq mi (0.0 km^{2})
- Elevation: 968 ft (295 m)

Population (2020)
  - Total: 78
  - Density: 2.1/sq mi (0.83/km^{2})
- Time zone: UTC-6 (Central (CST))
  - Summer (DST): UTC-5 (CDT)
- FIPS code: 27-21500
- GNIS feature ID: 0664184

Foldahl Township is a township in Marshall County, Minnesota, United States. The population was 78 at the 2020 census.

Foldahl Township was organized in 1883, and named after a place in Norway.

== Geography ==
According to the United States Census Bureau, the township has a total area of 36.3 square miles (94 km^{2}), all land.

== Demographics ==
As of the census of 2000, there were 94 people, 36 households, and 25 families residing in the township. The population density was 2.6 inhabitants per square mile (1.0/km^{2}). There were 45 housing units at an average density of 1.2 per square mile (0.46/km^{2}). The racial makeup of the township was 100.00% White.

There were 36 households, out of which 27.8% had children under the age of 18 living with them, 66.7% were married couples living together, 2.8% had a female householder with no husband present, and 27.8% were non-families. 27.8% of all households were made up of individuals, and 16.7% had someone living alone who was 65 years of age or older. The average household size was 2.61 and the average family size was 3.23.

In the township the population was spread out, with 27.7% under the age of 18, 3.2% from 18 to 24, 26.6% from 25 to 44, 20.2% from 45 to 64, and 22.3% who were 65 years of age or older. The median age was 40 years. For every 100 females, there were 118.6 males. For every 100 females age 18 and over, there were 112.5 males.

The median income for a household in the township was $34,286, and the median income for a family was $40,833. Males had a median income of $28,250 versus $21,875 for females. The per capita income for the township was $14,870. There were no families and 2.0% of the population living below the poverty line, including no under eighteens and 9.1% of those over 64.
