= Excel Township, Marshall County, Minnesota =

Excel Township, Minnesota
- Township
- Location of Excel Township, within Marshall County, Minnesota
- Coordinates: 48°13′5″N 96°11′0″W
- Country: United States
- State: Minnesota
- County: Marshall

Area
  - Total: 46.8 sq mi (121.2 km^{2})
  - Land: 46.8 sq mi (121.2 km^{2})
  - Water: 0 sq mi (0.0 km^{2})
- Elevation: 1,142 ft (348 m)

Population (2020)
  - Total: 310
  - Density: 6.6/sq mi (2.6/km^{2})
- Time zone: UTC-6 (Central (CST))
  - Summer (DST): UTC-5 (CDT)
- FIPS code: 27-20060
- GNIS feature ID: 0664122

Excel Township is a township in Marshall County, Minnesota, United States. The population was 310 at the 2020 census.

Excel Township was organized in 1884, and named after Excelsior, Minnesota.

== Geography ==
According to the United States Census Bureau, the township has a total area of 46.8 square miles (121 km^{2}), all land.

== Demographics ==
As of the census of 2000, there were 280 people, 103 households, and 83 families residing in the township. The population density was 6.0 inhabitants per square mile (2.3/km^{2}). There were 110 housing units at an average density of 2.3 per square mile (0.89/km^{2}). The racial makeup of the township was 99.64% White, and 0.36% from two or more races.

There were 103 households, out of which 35.9% had children under the age of 18 living with them, 78.6% were married couples living together, 1.0% had a female householder with no husband present, and 19.4% were non-families. 15.5% of all households were made up of individuals, and 5.8% had someone living alone who was 65 years of age or older. The average household size was 2.72 and the average family size was 3.06.

In the township the population was spread out, with 26.4% under the age of 18, 4.3% from 18 to 24, 30.7% from 25 to 44, 28.2% from 45 to 64, and 10.4% who were 65 years of age or older. The median age was 39 years. For every 100 females, there were 104.4 males. For every 100 females age 18 and over, there were 112.4 males.

The median income for a household in the township was $47,813, and the median income for a family was $50,833. Males had a median income of $26,458 versus $29,063 for females. The per capita income for the township was $15,511. About 3.3% of families and 5.6% of the population were below the poverty line, including 6.0% of those under the age of eighteen and none of those 65 or over.
