= East Park Township, Marshall County, Minnesota =

East Park Township, Minnesota
- Township
- Location of East Park Township, within Marshall County, Minnesota
- Coordinates: 48°29′45″N 96°18′31″W
- Country: United States
- State: Minnesota
- County: Marshall

Area
  - Total: 36.3 sq mi (94.0 km^{2})
  - Land: 33.8 sq mi (87.5 km^{2})
  - Water: 2.5 sq mi (6.5 km^{2})
- Elevation: 1,102 ft (336 m)

Population (2020)
  - Total: 29
  - Density: 0.86/sq mi (0.33/km^{2})
- Time zone: UTC-6 (Central (CST))
  - Summer (DST): UTC-5 (CDT)
- FIPS code: 27-17756
- GNIS feature ID: 0664033

East Park Township is a township in Marshall County, Minnesota, United States. The population was 29 at the 2020 census.

East Park Township was organized in 1899.

== Geography ==
According to the United States Census Bureau, the township has a total area of 36.3 square miles (94 km^{2}), of which 33.8 square miles (88 km^{2}) is land and 2.5 square miles (6.5 km^{2}) (6.92%) is water.

== Demographics ==
As of the census of 2000, there were 19 people, 7 households, and 4 families residing in the township. The population density was 0.6 inhabitants per square mile (0.23/km^{2}). There were 16 housing units at an average density of 0.5 per square mile (0.19/km^{2}). The racial makeup of the township was 94.74% White, and 5.26% from two or more races.

There were 7 households, out of which 57.1% had children under the age of 18 living with them, 71.4% were married couples living together, and 28.6% were non-families. 28.6% of all households were made up of individuals, and 14.3% had someone living alone who was 65 years of age or older. The average household size was 2.71 and the average family size was 3.40.

In the township the population was spread out, with 36.8% under the age of 18, 5.3% from 18 to 24, 36.8% from 25 to 44, 5.3% from 45 to 64, and 15.8% who were 65 years of age or older. The median age was 32 years. For every 100 females, there were 90.0 males. For every 100 females age 18 and over, there were 100.0 males.

The median income for a household in the township was $16,250, and the median income for a family was $11,250. Males had a median income of $21,250 versus $16,250 for females. The per capita income for the township was $7,750. Below the poverty line were 25.0% of people, 33.3% of families, 33.3% of those under 18 and none of those over 64.
