= Huntly Township, Marshall County, Minnesota =

Huntly Township, Minnesota
- Township
- Location of Huntly Township, within Marshall County, Minnesota
- Coordinates: 48°30′15″N 96°10′48″W
- Country: United States
- State: Minnesota
- County: Marshall

Area
  - Total: 36.6 sq mi (94.8 km^{2})
  - Land: 36.0 sq mi (93.3 km^{2})
  - Water: 0.58 sq mi (1.5 km^{2})
- Elevation: 1,132 ft (345 m)

Population (2020)
  - Total: 69
  - Density: 1.9/sq mi (0.74/km^{2})
- Time zone: UTC-6 (Central (CST))
  - Summer (DST): UTC-5 (CDT)
- FIPS code: 27-30572
- GNIS feature ID: 0664533

Huntly Township is a township in Marshall County, Minnesota, United States. The population was 69 at the 2020 census.

Huntly Township was organized in 1902, and named for the sport of hunting moose.

== Geography ==
According to the United States Census Bureau, the township has a total area of 36.6 square miles (95 km^{2}), of which 36.0 square miles (93 km^{2}) is land and 0.6 square miles (1.6 km^{2}) (1.56%) is water.

== Demographics ==
As of the census of 2000, there were 68 people, 32 households, and 20 families residing in the township. The population density was 1.9 inhabitants per square mile (0.73/km^{2}). There were 49 housing units at an average density of 1.4 per square mile (0.54/km^{2}). The racial makeup of the township was 98.53% White, and 1.47% from two or more races.

There were 32 households, out of which 18.8% had children under the age of 18 living with them, 59.4% were married couples living together, 6.3% had a female householder with no husband present, and 34.4% were non-families. 34.4% of all households were made up of individuals, and 18.8% had someone living alone who was 65 years of age or older. The average household size was 2.13 and the average family size was 2.71.

In the township the population was spread out, with 17.6% under the age of 18, 7.4% from 18 to 24, 26.5% from 25 to 44, 26.5% from 45 to 64, and 22.1% who were 65 years of age or older. The median age was 44 years. For every 100 females, there were 126.7 males. For every 100 females age 18 and over, there were 124.0 males.

The median income for a household in the township was $25,750, and the median income for a family was $34,375. Males had a median income of $18,750 versus $13,125 for females. The per capita income for the township was $11,968. There were no families and 4.1% of the population living below the poverty line, including no under eighteens and 11.1% of those over 64.
