= Strandquist, Minnesota =

City in Minnesota, United States

- City
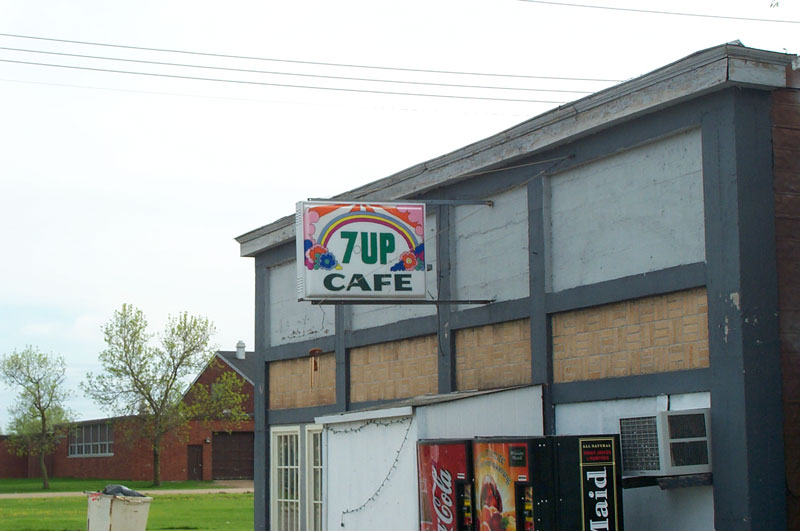
- The 7-Up Cafe in Strandquist

- Location of Strandquist, Minnesota
- Coordinates: 48°29′23″N 96°26′48″W
- Country: United States
- State: Minnesota
- County: Marshall
- Incorporated: July 31, 1923

Government
  - Mayor: Jake Cieklinski

Area
  - Total: 0.261 sq mi (0.677 km^{2})
  - Land: 0.261 sq mi (0.677 km^{2})
  - Water: 0 sq mi (0.000 km^{2})
- Elevation: 1,063 ft (324 m)

Population (2020)
  - Total: 70
  - Estimate (2022): 69
  - Density: 268.0/sq mi (103.47/km^{2})
- Time zone: UTC–6 (Central (CST))
  - Summer (DST): UTC–5 (CDT)
- ZIP Code: 56758
- Area code: 218
- FIPS code: 27-63112
- GNIS feature ID: 0652716
- Sales tax: 6.875%

Strandquist is a city in Lincoln Township of Marshall County, Minnesota, United States. The population was 70 at the 2020 census.

== History ==
A post office called Strandquist has been in operation since 1899. The city was named in honor of J. E. Strandquist, a Swedish pioneer merchant, born in 1870, who settled in 1892.

== Geography ==
According to the United States Census Bureau, the city has an area of 0.261 square miles (0.68 km^{2}), all land.

== Demographics ==
Historical population
Census	Pop.	Note	%±
1930	139		—
1940	180		29.5%
1950	208		15.6%
1960	160		−23.1%
1970	138		−13.7%
1980	136		−1.4%
1990	98		−27.9%
2000	88		−10.2%
2010	69		−21.6%
2020	70		1.4%
2022 (est.)	69		−1.4%
U.S. Decennial Census; 2020 Census

=== 2010 census ===
As of the 2010 census, there were 69 people, 32 households, and 16 families living in the city. The population density was 265.4 inhabitants per square mile (102.5/km^{2}). There were 47 housing units at an average density of 180.8 per square mile (69.8/km^{2}). The racial makeup of the city was 95.7% White, 1.4% Native American, and 2.9% from other races. Hispanic or Latino of any race were 4.3% of the population.

There were 32 households, of which 31.3% had children under the age of 18 living with them, 34.4% were married couples living together, 9.4% had a female householder with no husband present, 6.3% had a male householder with no wife present, and 50.0% were non-families. 43.8% of all households were made up of individuals, and 12.5% had someone living alone who was 65 years of age or older. The average household size was 2.16 and the average family size was 3.06.

The median age in the city was 45.2 years. 24.6% of residents were under the age of 18; 5.6% were between the ages of 18 and 24; 18.7% were from 25 to 44; 37.6% were from 45 to 64; and 13% were 65 years of age or older. The gender makeup of the city was 56.5% male and 43.5% female.

=== 2000 census ===
As of the 2000 census, there were 88 people, 39 households, and 23 families living in the city. The population density was 335.6 inhabitants per square mile (129.6/km^{2}). There were 50 housing units at an average density of 190.7 per square mile (73.6/km^{2}). The racial makeup of the city was 96.59% White, 1.14% Native American, 2.27% from other races. Hispanic or Latino of any race were 2.27% of the population.

There were 39 households, out of which 28.2% had children under the age of 18 living with them, 51.3% were married couples living together, 7.7% had a female householder with no husband present, and 38.5% were non-families. 33.3% of all households were made up of individuals, and 7.7% had someone living alone who was 65 years of age or older. The average household size was 2.26 and the average family size was 2.88.

In the city, the population was spread out, with 23.9% under the age of 18, 3.4% from 18 to 24, 33.0% from 25 to 44, 22.7% from 45 to 64, and 17.0% who were 65 years of age or older. The median age was 38 years. For every 100 females, there were 109.5 males. For every 100 females age 18 and over, there were 103.0 males.

The median income for a household in the city was $19,688, and the median income for a family was $24,375. Males had a median income of $27,500 versus $18,750 for females. The per capita income for the city was $12,962. There were 8.7% of families and 10.8% of the population living below the poverty line, including no under eighteens and 10.5% of those over 64.
