= Agder Township, Marshall County, Minnesota =

Agder Township, Minnesota
- Township
- Location of Agder Township, within Marshall County, Minnesota
- Coordinates: 48°12′40″N 96°2′39″W
- Country: United States
- State: Minnesota
- County: Marshall

Area
  - Total: 44.2 sq mi (114.6 km^{2})
  - Land: 44.2 sq mi (114.6 km^{2})
  - Water: 0 sq mi (0.0 km^{2})
- Elevation: 1,142 ft (348 m)

Population (2020)
  - Total: 112
  - Density: 2.53/sq mi (0.977/km^{2})
- Time zone: UTC-6 (Central (CST))
  - Summer (DST): UTC-5 (CDT)
- FIPS code: 27-00388
- GNIS feature ID: 0663386

Agder Township is a township in Marshall County, Minnesota, United States. The population was 112 at the 2020 census.

Agder Township was organized in 1902, and named after Agder, a historical district of Norway.

== Geography ==
According to the United States Census Bureau, the township has a total area of 44.3 square miles (115 km^{2}), of which 44.3 square miles (115 km^{2}) is land and 0.02% is water.

== Demographics ==
As of the census of 2000, there were 108 people, 41 households, and 33 families residing in the township. The population density was 2.4 people per square mile (0.9/km^{2}). There were 48 housing units at an average density of 1.1/sq mi (0.4/km^{2}). The racial makeup of the township was 98.15% White and 1.85% Asian.

There were 41 households, out of which 46.3% had children under the age of 18 living with them, 63.4% were married couples living together, 7.3% had a female householder with no husband present, and 17.1% were non-families. 12.2% of all households were made up of individuals, and 4.9% had someone living alone who was 65 years of age or older. The average household size was 2.63 and the average family size was 2.85.

In the township the population was spread out, with 29.6% under the age of 18, 9.3% from 18 to 24, 29.6% from 25 to 44, 25.9% from 45 to 64, and 5.6% who were 65 years of age or older. The median age was 32 years. For every 100 females, there were 125.0 males. For every 100 females age 18 and over, there were 117.1 males.

The median income for a household in the township was $34,375, and the median income for a family was $42,500. Males had a median income of $26,667 versus $22,917 for females. The per capita income for the township was $15,519. There were 10.0% of families and 16.4% of the population living below the poverty line, including 26.3% of under eighteens and none of those over 64.
