= West Valley Township, Marshall County, Minnesota =

Township in Minnesota, United States

West Valley Township, Minnesota
- Township
- Location of West Valley Township, within Marshall County, Minnesota
- Coordinates: 48°25′13″N 96°26′34″W
- Country: United States
- State: Minnesota
- County: Marshall

Area
  - Total: 36.4 sq mi (94.2 km^{2})
  - Land: 36.4 sq mi (94.2 km^{2})
  - Water: 0 sq mi (0.0 km^{2})
- Elevation: 1,063 ft (324 m)

Population (2020)
  - Total: 158
  - Density: 4.34/sq mi (1.68/km^{2})
- Time zone: UTC-6 (Central (CST))
  - Summer (DST): UTC-5 (CDT)
- FIPS code: 27-69772
- GNIS feature ID: 0665975

West Valley Township is a township in Marshall County, Minnesota, United States. The population was 158 at the 2020 census.

West Valley Township was organized in 1884, and named for the valley of the Middle River.

== Geography ==
According to the United States Census Bureau, the township has a total area of 36.4 square miles (94.2 km^{2}), all land.

== Demographics ==
As of the 2000 United States census, there were 147 people, 55 households, and 38 families residing in the township. The population density was 4.0 people per square mile (1.6/km^{2}). There were 76 housing units at an average density of 2.1/sq mi (0.8/km^{2}). The racial makeup of the township was 100.00% White.

There were 55 households, out of which 32.7% had children under the age of 18 living with them, 61.8% were married couples living together, 3.6% had a female householder with no husband present, and 30.9% were non-families. 27.3% of all households were made up of individuals, and 20.0% had someone living alone who was 65 years of age or older. The average household size was 2.67 and the average family size was 3.34.

In the township the population was spread out, with 28.6% under the age of 18, 10.2% from 18 to 24, 25.9% from 25 to 44, 21.1% from 45 to 64, and 14.3% who were 65 years of age or older. The median age was 34 years. For every 100 females, there were 110.0 males. For every 100 females age 18 and over, there were 110.0 males.

The median income for a household in the township was $25,625, and the median income for a family was $49,375. Males had a median income of $22,000 versus $20,625 for females. The per capita income for the township was $13,478. There were 6.9% of families and 7.9% of the population living below the poverty line, including no under eighteens and 6.3% of those over 64.
