= Linsell Township, Marshall County, Minnesota =

Linsell Township, Minnesota
- Township
- Location of Linsell Township, within Marshall County, Minnesota
- Coordinates: 48°29′46″N 95°41′15″W
- Country: United States
- State: Minnesota
- County: Marshall

Area
  - Total: 35.8 sq mi (92.8 km^{2})
  - Land: 35.8 sq mi (92.8 km^{2})
  - Water: 0 sq mi (0.0 km^{2})
- Elevation: 1,194 ft (364 m)

Population (2020)
  - Total: 20
  - Density: 0.56/sq mi (0.22/km^{2})
- Time zone: UTC-6 (Central (CST))
  - Summer (DST): UTC-5 (CDT)
- FIPS code: 27-37340
- GNIS feature ID: 0664792

Linsell Township is a township in Marshall County, Minnesota, United States. The population was 20 at the 2020 census.

Linsell Township was organized in 1908, and named after a place in Sweden.

== Geography ==
According to the United States Census Bureau, the township has a total area of 35.8 square miles (93 km^{2}), all land.

== Demographics ==
As of the census of 2000, there were 36 people, 16 households, and 11 families residing in the township. The population density was 1.0 inhabitant per square mile (0.39/km^{2}). There were 34 housing units at an average density of 0.9 per square mile (0.35/km^{2}). The racial makeup of the township was 100.00% White.

There were 16 households, out of which 18.8% had children under the age of 18 living with them, 62.5% were married couples living together, and 31.3% were non-families. 31.3% of all households were made up of individuals, and 6.3% had someone living alone who was 65 years of age or older. The average household size was 2.25 and the average family size was 2.73.

In the township the population was spread out, with 13.9% under the age of 18, 5.6% from 18 to 24, 27.8% from 25 to 44, 41.7% from 45 to 64, and 11.1% who were 65 years of age or older. The median age was 48 years. For every 100 females, there were 176.9 males. For every 100 females age 18 and over, there were 158.3 males.

The median income for a household in the township was $42,500, and the median income for a family was $45,625. Males had a median income of $24,688 versus $21,250 for females. The per capita income for the township was $20,770. There were no families and 11.1% of the population living below the poverty line, including no under eighteens and none of those over 64.
