= Viking Township, Marshall County, Minnesota =

Viking Township, Minnesota
- Township
- Location of Viking Township, within Marshall County, Minnesota
- Coordinates: 48°13′31″N 96°26′9″W
- Country: United States
- State: Minnesota
- County: Marshall

Area
  - Total: 44.9 sq mi (116.4 km^{2})
  - Land: 44.9 sq mi (116.4 km^{2})
  - Water: 0 sq mi (0.0 km^{2})
- Elevation: 1,050 ft (320 m)

Population (2020)
  - Total: 175
  - Density: 3.89/sq mi (1.50/km^{2})
- Time zone: UTC-6 (Central (CST))
  - Summer (DST): UTC-5 (CDT)
- ZIP code: 56760
- Area code: 218
- FIPS code: 27-67108
- GNIS feature ID: 0665873

Viking Township is a township in Marshall County, Minnesota, United States. The population was 175 at the 2020 census.

Viking Township was organized in 1884, and named for the Vikings.

== Geography ==
According to the United States Census Bureau, the township has a total area of 45.0 square miles (116.4 km^{2}), all land.

== Demographics ==
As of the census of 2000, there were 145 people, 63 households, and 46 families residing in the township. The population density was 3.2 people per square mile (1.2/km^{2}). There were 74 housing units at an average density of 1.6/sq mi (0.6/km^{2}). The racial makeup of the township was 98.62% White, and 1.38% from two or more races.

There were 63 households, out of which 22.2% had children under the age of 18 living with them, 68.3% were married couples living together, 4.8% had a female householder with no husband present, and 25.4% were non-families. 25.4% of all households were made up of individuals, and 7.9% had someone living alone who was 65 years of age or older. The average household size was 2.30 and the average family size was 2.70.

In the township the population was spread out, with 20.7% under the age of 18, 4.8% from 18 to 24, 20.0% from 25 to 44, 37.9% from 45 to 64, and 16.6% who were 65 years of age or older. The median age was 47 years. For every 100 females, there were 126.6 males. For every 100 females age 18 and over, there were 125.5 males.

The median income for a household in the township was $33,542, and the median income for a family was $41,458. Males had a median income of $32,083 versus $30,000 for females. The per capita income for the township was $17,015. There were 4.3% of families and 4.0% of the population living below the poverty line, including no under eighteens and 6.7% of those over 64.
