= East Valley Township, Marshall County, Minnesota =

East Valley Township, Minnesota
- Township
- Location of East Valley Township, within Marshall County, Minnesota
- Coordinates: 48°20′14″N 96°2′28″W
- Country: United States
- State: Minnesota
- County: Marshall

Area
  - Total: 34.9 sq mi (90.4 km^{2})
  - Land: 22.0 sq mi (57.0 km^{2})
  - Water: 12.9 sq mi (33.3 km^{2})
- Elevation: 1,138 ft (347 m)

Population (2020)
  - Total: 43
  - Density: 2.0/sq mi (0.75/km^{2})
- Time zone: UTC-6 (Central (CST))
  - Summer (DST): UTC-5 (CDT)
- FIPS code: 27-17864
- GNIS feature ID: 0664035

East Valley Township is a township in Marshall County, Minnesota, United States. The population was 43 at the 2020 census.

East Valley Township was organized in 1896.

== Geography ==
According to the United States Census Bureau, the township has a total area of 34.9 square miles (90 km^{2}), of which 22.0 square miles (57 km^{2}) is land and 12.9 square miles (33 km^{2}) of it (36.88%) is water.

== Demographics ==
As of the census of 2000, there were 45 people, 19 households, and 12 families residing in the township. The population density was 2.0 inhabitants per square mile (0.77/km^{2}). There were 27 housing units at an average density of 1.2 per square mile (0.46/km^{2}). The racial makeup of the township was 97.78% White and 2.22% Native American. Hispanic or Latino of any race were 2.22% of the population.

There were 19 households, out of which 21.1% had children under the age of 18 living with them, 52.6% were married couples living together, 10.5% had a female householder with no husband present, and 36.8% were non-families. 26.3% of all households were made up of individuals, and 10.5% had someone living alone who was 65 years of age or older. The average household size was 2.37 and the average family size was 2.67.

In the township the population was spread out, with 13.3% under the age of 18, 20.0% from 18 to 24, 28.9% from 25 to 44, 31.1% from 45 to 64, and 6.7% who were 65 years of age or older. The median age was 38 years. For every 100 females, there were 125.0 males. For every 100 females age 18 and over, there were 116.7 males.

The median income for a household in the township was $26,250, and the median income for a family was $38,750. Males had a median income of $33,750 versus $20,833 for females. The per capita income for the township was $17,760. There were 16.7% of families and 17.0% of the population living below the poverty line, including no under eighteens and none of those over 64.
