= Cedar Township, Marshall County, Minnesota =

Cedar Township, Minnesota
- Township
- Location of Cedar Township, within Marshall County, Minnesota
- Coordinates: 48°24′37″N 96°2′34″W
- Country: United States
- State: Minnesota
- County: Marshall

Area
  - Total: 36.3 sq mi (93.9 km^{2})
  - Land: 32.1 sq mi (83.2 km^{2})
  - Water: 4.1 sq mi (10.7 km^{2})
- Elevation: 1,152 ft (351 m)

Population (2020)
  - Total: 74
  - Density: 2.3/sq mi (0.89/km^{2})
- Time zone: UTC-6 (Central (CST))
  - Summer (DST): UTC-5 (CDT)
- FIPS code: 27-10360
- GNIS feature ID: 0663764

Cedar Township is a township in Marshall County, Minnesota, United States. The population was 74 at the 2020 census.

Cedar Township was organized in 1902, and named for the abundance of white cedar within its borders.

== Geography ==
According to the United States Census Bureau, the township has a total area of 36.3 square miles (94 km^{2}), of which 32.1 square miles (83 km^{2}) is land and 4.1 square miles (11 km^{2}) (11.41%) is water.

== Demographics ==
As of the census of 2000, there were 94 people, 39 households, and 26 families residing in the township. The population density was 2.9 inhabitants per square mile (1.1/km^{2}). There were 46 housing units at an average density of 1.4 per square mile (0.54/km^{2}). The racial makeup of the township was 96.81% White, 1.06% Native American, and 2.13% from two or more races.

There were 39 households, out of which 23.1% had children under the age of 18 living with them, 61.5% were married couples living together, 7.7% had a female householder with no husband present, and 30.8% were non-families. 30.8% of all households were made up of individuals, and 12.8% had someone living alone who was 65 years of age or older. The average household size was 2.41 and the average family size was 2.96.

In the township the population was spread out, with 18.1% under the age of 18, 9.6% from 18 to 24, 26.6% from 25 to 44, 26.6% from 45 to 64, and 19.1% who were 65 years of age or older. The median age was 44 years. For every 100 females, there were 100.0 males. For every 100 females age 18 and over, there were 92.5 males.

The median income for a household in the township was $36,250, and the median income for a family was $41,250. Males had a median income of $27,250 versus $26,875 for females. The per capita income for the township was $15,739. There were no families and 1.8% of the population living below the poverty line, including no under eighteens and 7.7% of those over 64.
