= McCrea Township, Marshall County, Minnesota =

McCrea Township, Minnesota
- Township
- Location of McCrea Township, within Marshall County, Minnesota
- Coordinates: 48°12′56″N 96°41′45″W
- Country: United States
- State: Minnesota
- County: Marshall

Area
  - Total: 45.0 sq mi (116.5 km^{2})
  - Land: 45.0 sq mi (116.5 km^{2})
  - Water: 0 sq mi (0.0 km^{2})
- Elevation: 890 ft (270 m)

Population (2020)
  - Total: 247
  - Density: 5.49/sq mi (2.12/km^{2})
- Time zone: UTC-6 (Central (CST))
  - Summer (DST): UTC-5 (CDT)
- FIPS code: 27-38942
- GNIS feature ID: 0664855

McCrea Township is a township in Marshall County, Minnesota, United States. The population was 247 at the 2020 census.

McCrea Township was organized in 1882, and named for Andrew McCrea, a state legislator.

== Geography ==
According to the United States Census Bureau, the township has a total area of 45.0 square miles (116.5 km^{2}), all land.

== Demographics ==
As of the census of 2000, there were 250 people, 103 households, and 84 families residing in the township. The population density was 5.6 inhabitants per square mile (2.2/km^{2}). There were 106 housing units at an average density of 2.4 per square mile (0.93/km^{2}). The racial makeup of the township was 98.00% White and 2.00% Native American.

There were 103 households, out of which 23.3% had children under the age of 18 living with them, 73.8% were married couples living together, 2.9% had a female householder with no husband present, and 18.4% were non-families. 17.5% of all households were made up of individuals, and 10.7% had someone living alone who was 65 years of age or older. The average household size was 2.43 and the average family size was 2.68.

In the township the population was spread out, with 20.0% under the age of 18, 3.6% from 18 to 24, 22.4% from 25 to 44, 34.4% from 45 to 64, and 19.6% who were 65 years of age or older. The median age was 48 years. For every 100 females, there were 110.1 males. For every 100 females age 18 and over, there were 112.8 males.

The median income for a household in the township was $52,500, and the median income for a family was $55,750. Males had a median income of $37,917 versus $17,500 for females. The per capita income for the township was $23,676. About 1.1% of families and 4.3% of the population were below the poverty line, including none of those under the age of eighteen and 6.7% of those 65 or over.
