= Como Township, Marshall County, Minnesota =

Como Township, Minnesota
- Township
- Location of Como Township, within Marshall County, Minnesota
- Coordinates: 48°30′13″N 96°2′35″W
- Country: United States
- State: Minnesota
- County: Marshall

Area
  - Total: 36.3 sq mi (94.1 km^{2})
  - Land: 36.3 sq mi (94.1 km^{2})
  - Water: 0 sq mi (0.0 km^{2})
- Elevation: 1,207 ft (368 m)

Population (2020)
  - Total: 44
  - Density: 1.2/sq mi (0.47/km^{2})
- Time zone: UTC-6 (Central (CST))
  - Summer (DST): UTC-5 (CDT)
- FIPS code: 27-12808
- GNIS feature ID: 0663857

Como Township is a township in Marshall County, Minnesota, United States. The population was 44 at the 2020 census.

Como Township was organized in 1900, and named after Como Lake in Saint Paul, Minnesota.

== Geography ==
According to the United States Census Bureau, the township has a total area of 36.3 square miles (94 km^{2}), all land.

== Demographics ==
As of the census of 2000, there were 52 people, 21 households, and 17 families residing in the township. The population density was 1.4 inhabitants per square mile (0.54/km^{2}). There were 37 housing units at an average density of 1.0 per square mile (0.39/km^{2}). The racial makeup of the township was 100.00% White.

There were 21 households, out of which 28.6% had children under the age of 18 living with them, 66.7% were married couples living together, 9.5% had a female householder with no husband present, and 19.0% were non-families. 19.0% of all households were made up of individuals, and 4.8% had someone living alone who was 65 years of age or older. The average household size was 2.48 and the average family size was 2.82.

In the township the population was spread out, with 17.3% under the age of 18, 13.5% from 18 to 24, 34.6% from 25 to 44, 28.8% from 45 to 64, and 5.8% who were 65 years of age or older. The median age was 42 years. For every 100 females, there were 116.7 males. For every 100 females age 18 and over, there were 138.9 males.

The median income for a household in the township was $39,167, and the median income for a family was $39,167. Males had a median income of $26,563 versus $25,000 for females. The per capita income for the township was $12,950. None of the population or the families were below the poverty line.
