= Holt Township =

Holt Township is the name of a few places in the United States:

- Holt Township, Taylor County, Iowa
- Holt Township, Fillmore County, Minnesota
- Holt Township, Marshall County, Minnesota
- Holt Township, Gage County, Nebraska
- Holt Township, Adams County, North Dakota
