= Grand Plain Township, Marshall County, Minnesota =

Grand Plain Township, Minnesota
- Township
- Location of Grand Plain Township, within Marshall County, Minnesota
- Coordinates: 48°12′3″N 95°55′43″W
- Country: United States
- State: Minnesota
- County: Marshall

Area
  - Total: 44.9 sq mi (116.3 km^{2})
  - Land: 44.9 sq mi (116.2 km^{2})
  - Water: 0 sq mi (0.0 km^{2})
- Elevation: 1,150 ft (350 m)

Population (2020)
  - Total: 54
  - Density: 1.2/sq mi (0.46/km^{2})
- Time zone: UTC-6 (Central (CST))
  - Summer (DST): UTC-5 (CDT)
- FIPS code: 27-25046
- GNIS feature ID: 0664316

Grand Plain Township is a township in Marshall County, Minnesota, United States. The population was 54 at the 2020 census.

Grand Plain Township was organized in 1898, and named for the character of its landscape.

== Geography ==
According to the United States Census Bureau, the township has a total area of 44.9 square miles (116 km^{2}), of which 44.9 square miles (116 km^{2}) is land and 0.02% is water.

== Demographics ==
As of the census of 2000, there were 55 people, 22 households, and 19 families residing in the township. The population density was 1.2 inhabitants per square mile (0.46/km^{2}). There were 29 housing units at an average density of 0.6 per square mile (0.23/km^{2}). The racial makeup of the township was 100.00% White.

There were 22 households, out of which 22.7% had children under the age of 18 living with them, 81.8% were married couples living together, and 13.6% were non-families. 13.6% of all households were made up of individuals, and 4.5% had someone living alone who was 65 years of age or older. The average household size was 2.50 and the average family size was 2.74.

In the township the population was spread out, with 23.6% under the age of 18, 5.5% from 18 to 24, 16.4% from 25 to 44, 23.6% from 45 to 64, and 30.9% who were 65 years of age or older. The median age was 51 years. For every 100 females, there were 139.1 males. For every 100 females age 18 and over, there were 133.3 males.

The median income for a household in the township was $31,563, and the median income for a family was $31,250. Males had a median income of $26,250 versus $26,250 for females. The per capita income for the township was $15,398. There were 33.3% of families and 37.3% of the population living below the poverty line, including 72.7% of under eighteens and 30.8% of those over 64.
