= Parker Township, Marshall County, Minnesota =

Parker Township, Minnesota
- Township
- Location of Parker Township, within Marshall County, Minnesota
- Coordinates: 48°24′21″N 96°57′57″W
- Country: United States
- State: Minnesota
- County: Marshall

Area
  - Total: 35.9 sq mi (92.9 km^{2})
  - Land: 35.9 sq mi (92.9 km^{2})
  - Water: 0 sq mi (0.0 km^{2})
- Elevation: 810 ft (247 m)

Population (2020)
  - Total: 36
  - Density: 1.0/sq mi (0.39/km^{2})
- Time zone: UTC-6 (Central (CST))
  - Summer (DST): UTC-5 (CDT)
- FIPS code: 27-49696
- GNIS feature ID: 0665255

Parker Township is a township in Marshall County, Minnesota, United States. The population was 36 at the 2020 census. Parker Township was organized in 1884, and named for George L. Parker, an early settler who had come to the area from Norridgewock, Maine.

== Geography ==
According to the United States Census Bureau, the township has a total area of 35.9 square miles (92.9 km^{2}), all land.

== Demographics ==
As of the census of 2000, there were 57 people, 18 households, and 16 families residing in the township. The population density was 1.6 people per square mile (0.6/km^{2}). There were 25 housing units at an average density of 0.7/sq mi (0.3/km^{2}). The racial makeup of the township was 100.00% White.

There were 18 households, out of which 38.9% had children under the age of 18 living with them, 88.9% were married couples living together, and 11.1% were non-families. 11.1% of all households were made up of individuals, and none had someone living alone who was 65 years of age or older. The average household size was 3.17 and the average family size was 3.44.

In the township the population was spread out, with 29.8% under the age of 18, 3.5% from 18 to 24, 33.3% from 25 to 44, 15.8% from 45 to 64, and 17.5% who were 65 years of age or older. The median age was 38 years. For every 100 females, there were 137.5 males. For every 100 females age 18 and over, there were 122.2 males.

The median income for a household in the township was $9,688, and the median income for a family was $18,125. Males had a median income of $21,250 versus $8,750 for females. The per capita income for the township was $8,538. There were 45.5% of families and 45.2% of the population living below the poverty line, including 52.9% of under eighteens and none of those over 64.
