= Alma Township, Marshall County, Minnesota =

Alma Township, Minnesota
- Township
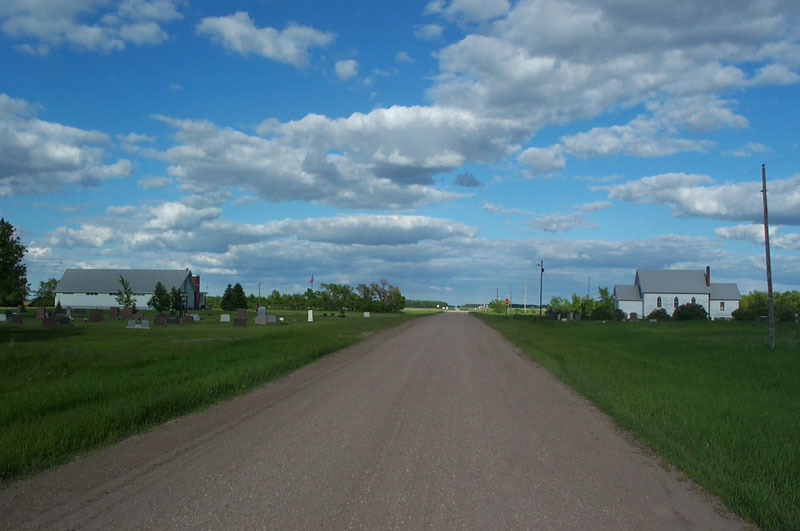

- Location of Alma Township, within Marshall County, Minnesota
- Coordinates: 48°19′24″N 96°41′53″W
- Country: United States
- State: Minnesota
- County: Marshall

Area
  - Total: 36.4 sq mi (94.3 km^{2})
  - Land: 36.4 sq mi (94.3 km^{2})
  - Water: 0 sq mi (0.0 km^{2})
- Elevation: 889 ft (271 m)

Population (2020)
  - Total: 77
  - Density: 2.1/sq mi (0.82/km^{2})
- Time zone: UTC-6 (Central (CST))
  - Summer (DST): UTC-5 (CDT)
- FIPS code: 27-01072
- GNIS feature ID: 0663416

Alma Township is a township in Marshall County, Minnesota, United States. The population was 77 at the 2020 census.

Alma Township was organized in 1882, and named for Alma Dahlgren, the first white child born there.

== Geography ==
According to the United States Census Bureau, the township has a total area of 36.4 square miles (94 km^{2}), of which 36.4 square miles (94 km^{2}) is land and 0.03% is water.

== Demographics ==
As of the census of 2000, there were 94 people, 39 households, and 23 families residing in the township. The population density was 2.6 people per square mile (1.0/km^{2}). There were 46 housing units at an average density of 1.3/sq mi (0.5/km^{2}). The racial makeup of the township was 98.94% White and 1.06% African American.

There were 39 households, out of which 33.3% had children under the age of 18 living with them, 59.0% were married couples living together, and 38.5% were non-families. 35.9% of all households were made up of individuals, and 20.5% had someone living alone who was 65 years of age or older. The average household size was 2.41 and the average family size was 3.21.

In the township the population was spread out, with 25.5% under the age of 18, 6.4% from 18 to 24, 21.3% from 25 to 44, 23.4% from 45 to 64, and 23.4% who were 65 years of age or older. The median age was 43 years. For every 100 females, there were 104.3 males. For every 100 females age 18 and over, there were 105.9 males.

The median income for a household in the township was $36,563, and the median income for a family was $53,438. Males had a median income of $28,125 versus $22,083 for females. The per capita income for the township was $15,793. There were no families and 1.1% of the population living below the poverty line, including no under eighteens and none of those over 64.
