= Moose River Township, Marshall County, Minnesota =

Moose River Township, Minnesota
- Township
- Location of Moose River Township, within Marshall County, Minnesota
- Coordinates: 48°29′32″N 95°48′25″W
- Country: United States
- State: Minnesota
- County: Marshall

Area
  - Total: 35.6 sq mi (92.3 km^{2})
  - Land: 33.6 sq mi (87.1 km^{2})
  - Water: 2.0 sq mi (5.2 km^{2})
- Elevation: 1,171 ft (357 m)

Population (2020)
  - Total: 28
  - Density: 0.83/sq mi (0.32/km^{2})
- Time zone: UTC-6 (Central (CST))
  - Summer (DST): UTC-5 (CDT)
- FIPS code: 27-44026
- GNIS feature ID: 0665028

Moose River Township is a township in Marshall County, Minnesota, United States. The population was 28 at the 2020 census.

Moose River Township was organized in 1904, and named after Moose River.

== Geography ==
According to the United States Census Bureau, the township has a total area of 35.7 square miles (92.3 km^{2}), of which 33.6 square miles (87.1 km^{2}) is land and 2.0 square miles (5.2 km^{2}) (5.64%) is water.

== Demographics ==
As of the census of 2000, there were 28 people, 13 households, and 9 families residing in the township. The population density was 0.8 people per square mile (0.3/km^{2}). There were 29 housing units at an average density of 0.9/sq mi (0.3/km^{2}). The racial makeup of the township was 100.00% White.

There were 13 households, out of which 7.7% had children under the age of 18 living with them, 76.9% were married couples living together, and 23.1% were non-families. 23.1% of all households were made up of individuals, and 7.7% had someone living alone who was 65 years of age or older. The average household size was 2.15 and the average family size was 2.50.

In the township the population was spread out, with 14.3% under the age of 18, 14.3% from 25 to 44, 39.3% from 45 to 64, and 32.1% who were 65 years of age or older. The median age was 60 years. For every 100 females, there were 133.3 males. For every 100 females age 18 and over, there were 118.2 males.

The median income for a household in the township was $41,250, and the median income for a family was $41,250. Males had a median income of $26,875 versus $37,917 for females. The per capita income for the township was $24,138. None of the population or the families were below the poverty line.
