= Donnelly Township, Marshall County, Minnesota =

Donnelly Township, Minnesota
- Township
- Location of Donnelly Township, within Marshall County, Minnesota
- Coordinates: 48°29′46″N 96°58′37″W
- Country: United States
- State: Minnesota
- County: Marshall

Area
  - Total: 36.1 sq mi (93.5 km^{2})
  - Land: 36.1 sq mi (93.5 km^{2})
  - Water: 0 sq mi (0.0 km^{2})
- Elevation: 810 ft (247 m)

Population (2020)
  - Total: 20
  - Density: 0.55/sq mi (0.21/km^{2})
- Time zone: UTC-6 (Central (CST))
  - Summer (DST): UTC-5 (CDT)
- FIPS code: 27-16066
- GNIS feature ID: 0663989

Donnelly Township is a township in Marshall County, Minnesota, United States. The population was 20 at the 2020 census.

Donnelly Township was organized in 1895, and named for Ignatius L. Donnelly, a U.S. congressman from Minnesota.

== Geography ==
According to the United States Census Bureau, the township has a total area of 36.1 square miles (93 km^{2}), all land.

== Demographics ==
As of the census of 2000, there were 28 people, 10 households, and 8 families residing in the township. The population density was 0.8 inhabitants per square mile (0.31/km^{2}). There were 10 housing units at an average density of 0.3 per square mile (0.12/km^{2}). The racial makeup of the township was 100.00% White.

There were 10 households, out of which 50.0% had children under the age of 18 living with them, 70.0% were married couples living together, and 20.0% were non-families. 20.0% of all households were made up of individuals, and 10.0% had someone living alone who was 65 years of age or older. The average household size was 2.80 and the average family size was 3.25.

In the township the population was spread out, with 32.1% under the age of 18, 3.6% from 18 to 24, 28.6% from 25 to 44, 17.9% from 45 to 64, and 17.9% who were 65 years of age or older. The median age was 41 years. For every 100 females, there were 154.5 males. For every 100 females age 18 and over, there were 137.5 males.

The median income for a household in the township was $40,625, and the median income for a family was $41,875. Males had a median income of $20,000 versus $25,000 for females. The per capita income for the township was $19,561. None of the population or the families were below the poverty line.
