= New Maine Township, Marshall County, Minnesota =

New Maine Township, Minnesota
- Township
- Location of New Maine Township, within Marshall County, Minnesota
- Coordinates: 48°24′22″N 96°19′56″W
- Country: United States
- State: Minnesota
- County: Marshall

Area
  - Total: 36.9 sq mi (95.5 km^{2})
  - Land: 36.9 sq mi (95.5 km^{2})
  - Water: 0 sq mi (0.0 km^{2})
- Elevation: 1,106 ft (337 m)

Population (2020)
  - Total: 200
  - Density: 5.4/sq mi (2.1/km^{2})
- Time zone: UTC-6 (Central (CST))
  - Summer (DST): UTC-5 (CDT)
- FIPS code: 27-45718
- GNIS feature ID: 0665102

New Maine Township is a township in Marshall County, Minnesota, United States. The population was 200 at the 2020 census.

New Maine Township was organized in 1900, and named after Maine, the native home of a share of a large share of the early settlers.

== Geography ==
According to the United States Census Bureau, the township has a total area of 36.9 square miles (95.5 km^{2}), all land.

== Demographics ==
As of the census of 2000, there were 194 people, 77 households, and 58 families residing in the township. The population density was 5.3 people per square mile (2.0/km^{2}). There were 93 housing units at an average density of 2.5/sq mi (1.0/km^{2}). The racial makeup of the township was 100.00% White.

There were 77 households, out of which 31.2% had children under the age of 18 living with them, 67.5% were married couples living together, 5.2% had a female householder with no husband present, and 23.4% were non-families. 20.8% of all households were made up of individuals, and 6.5% had someone living alone who was 65 years of age or older. The average household size was 2.52 and the average family size was 2.95.

In the township the population was spread out, with 23.2% under the age of 18, 9.3% from 18 to 24, 25.8% from 25 to 44, 32.0% from 45 to 64, and 9.8% who were 65 years of age or older. The median age was 42 years. For every 100 females, there were 133.7 males. For every 100 females age 18 and over, there were 132.8 males.

The median income for a household in the township was $32,813, and the median income for a family was $38,281. Males had a median income of $23,750 versus $21,458 for females. The per capita income for the township was $12,554. About 13.1% of families and 17.6% of the population were below the poverty line, including 27.7% of those under the age of eighteen and 38.9% of those 65 or over.
