= Augsburg Township, Marshall County, Minnesota =

Augsburg Township, Minnesota
- Township
- Location of Augsburg Township, within Marshall County, Minnesota
- Coordinates: 48°30′46″N 96°43′40″W
- Country: United States
- State: Minnesota
- County: Marshall

Area
  - Total: 36.1 sq mi (93.6 km^{2})
  - Land: 36.1 sq mi (93.6 km^{2})
  - Water: 0 sq mi (0.0 km^{2})
- Elevation: 892 ft (272 m)

Population (2020)
  - Total: 71
  - Density: 2.0/sq mi (0.76/km^{2})
- Time zone: UTC-6 (Central (CST))
  - Summer (DST): UTC-5 (CDT)
- FIPS code: 27-02764
- GNIS feature ID: 0663477

Augsburg Township is a township in Marshall County, Minnesota, United States. The population was 71 at the 2020 census.

Augsburg Township was organized in 1884, and named after Augsburg, in Germany.

== Geography ==
According to the United States Census Bureau, the township has a total area of 36.2 square miles (94 km^{2}), all land.

== Demographics ==
As of the census of 2000, there were 98 people, 30 households, and 24 families residing in the township. The population density was 2.7 people per square mile (1.0/km^{2}). There were 39 housing units at an average density of 1.1/sq mi (0.4/km^{2}). The racial makeup of the township was 92.86% White, 3.06% Native American, 1.02% Asian, and 3.06% from two or more races.

There were 30 households, out of which 40.0% had children under the age of 18 living with them, 66.7% were married couples living together, 10.0% had a female householder with no husband present, and 20.0% were non-families. 20.0% of all households were made up of individuals, and 6.7% had someone living alone who was 65 years of age or older. The average household size was 3.27 and the average family size was 3.83.

In the township the population was spread out, with 37.8% under the age of 18, 5.1% from 18 to 24, 24.5% from 25 to 44, 20.4% from 45 to 64, and 12.2% who were 65 years of age or older. The median age was 34 years. For every 100 females, there were 145.0 males. For every 100 females age 18 and over, there were 110.3 males.

The median income for a household in the township was $38,125, and the median income for a family was $38,750. Males had a median income of $20,938 versus $26,250 for females. The per capita income for the township was $11,206. There were 26.5% of families and 17.1% of the population living below the poverty line, including 5.4% of under eighteens and 60.9% of those over 64.
