= Sinnott Township, Marshall County, Minnesota =

Sinnott Township, Minnesota
- Township
- Location of Sinnott Township, within Marshall County, Minnesota
- Coordinates: 48°30′25″N 96°51′24″W
- Country: United States
- State: Minnesota
- County: Marshall

Area
  - Total: 36.1 sq mi (93.6 km^{2})
  - Land: 36.1 sq mi (93.6 km^{2})
  - Water: 0 sq mi (0.0 km^{2})
- Elevation: 840 ft (256 m)

Population (2020)
  - Total: 26
  - Density: 0.72/sq mi (0.28/km^{2})
- Time zone: UTC-6 (Central (CST))
  - Summer (DST): UTC-5 (CDT)
- FIPS code: 27-60520
- GNIS feature ID: 0665620

Sinnott Township is a township in Marshall County, Minnesota, United States. The population was 26 at the 2020 census.

Sinnott Township was organized in 1883, and named for J. P. and P. J. Sinnott, early settlers.

== Geography ==
According to the United States Census Bureau, the township has a total area of 36.2 square miles (93.7 km^{2}), all land.

== Demographics ==
As of the census of 2000, there were 52 people, 25 households, and 16 families residing in the township. The population density was 1.4 people per square mile (0.6/km^{2}). There were 27 housing units at an average density of 0.7/sq mi (0.3/km^{2}). The racial makeup of the township was 100.00% White.

There were 25 households, out of which 20.0% had children under the age of 18 living with them, 52.0% were married couples living together, 8.0% had a female householder with no husband present, and 36.0% were non-families. 28.0% of all households were made up of individuals, and 16.0% had someone living alone who was 65 years of age or older. The average household size was 2.08 and the average family size was 2.56.

In the township the population was spread out, with 15.4% under the age of 18, 3.8% from 18 to 24, 23.1% from 25 to 44, 25.0% from 45 to 64, and 32.7% who were 65 years of age or older. The median age was 47 years. For every 100 females, there were 126.1 males. For every 100 females age 18 and over, there were 131.6 males.

The median income for a household in the township was $26,875, and the median income for a family was $25,625. Males had a median income of $38,750 versus $0 for females. The per capita income for the township was $19,459. There were 9.5% of families and 14.8% of the population living below the poverty line, including 50.0% of under eighteens and none of those over 64.
