= Boxville Township, Marshall County, Minnesota =

Boxville Township, Minnesota
- Township
- Location of Boxville Township, within Marshall County, Minnesota
- Coordinates: 48°10′49″N 96°49′47″W
- Country: United States
- State: Minnesota
- County: Marshall

Area
  - Total: 8.4 sq mi (21.7 km^{2})
  - Land: 8.4 sq mi (21.7 km^{2})
  - Water: 0 sq mi (0.0 km^{2})
- Elevation: 840 ft (256 m)

Population (2020)
  - Total: 48
  - Density: 5.7/sq mi (2.2/km^{2})
- Time zone: UTC-6 (Central (CST))
  - Summer (DST): UTC-5 (CDT)
- FIPS code: 27-07120
- GNIS feature ID: 0663640

Boxville Township is a township in Marshall County, Minnesota, United States. The population was 48 at the 2020 census.

Boxville Township was organized in 1884, and named for William N. Box, an early settler.

== Geography ==
According to the United States Census Bureau, the township has a total area of 8.4 square miles (22 km^{2}), all land.

== Demographics ==
As of the census of 2000, there were 31 people, 17 households, and 12 families residing in the township. The population density was 3.7 inhabitants per square mile (1.4/km^{2}). There were 19 housing units at an average density of 2.3 per square mile (0.89/km^{2}). The racial makeup of the township was 100.00% White.

There were 17 households, out of which none had children under the age of 18 living with them, 64.7% were married couples living together, 5.9% had a female householder with no husband present, and 29.4% were non-families. 29.4% of all households were made up of individuals, and 17.6% had someone living alone who was 65 years of age or older. The average household size was 1.82 and the average family size was 2.17.

In the township the population was spread out, with 9.7% from 18 to 24, 16.1% from 25 to 44, 38.7% from 45 to 64, and 35.5% who were 65 years of age or older. The median age was 58 years. For every 100 females, there were 93.8 males. For every 100 females age 18 and over, there were 93.8 males.

The median income for a household in the township was $46,875, and the median income for a family was $46,875. Males had a median income of $20,625 versus $14,375 for females. The per capita income for the township was $31,503. None of the population or the families were below the poverty line.
