= Marsh Grove Township, Marshall County, Minnesota =

Marsh Grove Township, Minnesota
- Township
- Location of Marsh Grove Township, within Marshall County, Minnesota
- Coordinates: 48°19′53″N 96°26′33″W
- Country: United States
- State: Minnesota
- County: Marshall

Area
  - Total: 35.8 sq mi (92.7 km^{2})
  - Land: 35.8 sq mi (92.7 km^{2})
  - Water: 0 sq mi (0.0 km^{2})
- Elevation: 1,060 ft (323 m)

Population (2020)
  - Total: 119
  - Density: 3.32/sq mi (1.28/km^{2})
- Time zone: UTC-6 (Central (CST))
  - Summer (DST): UTC-5 (CDT)
- FIPS code: 27-40778
- GNIS feature ID: 0664922

Marsh Grove Township is a township in Marshall County, Minnesota, United States. The population was 119 at the 2020 census.

Marsh Grove Township was organized in 1884, and named for the marshes and groves within its borders.

== Geography ==
According to the United States Census Bureau, the township has a total area of 35.8 square miles (92.7 km^{2}), all land.

== Demographics ==
As of the census of 2000, there were 145 people, 55 households, and 43 families residing in the township. The population density was 4.0 inhabitants per square mile (1.5/km^{2}). There were 64 housing units at an average density of 1.8 per square mile (0.69/km^{2}). The racial makeup of the township was 98.62% White, 0.69% African American, and 0.69% from two or more races. Hispanic or Latino of any race were 0.69% of the population.

There were 55 households, out of which 32.7% had children under the age of 18 living with them, 67.3% were married couples living together, 7.3% had a female householder with no husband present, and 21.8% were non-families. 20.0% of all households were made up of individuals, and 9.1% had someone living alone who was 65 years of age or older. The average household size was 2.64 and the average family size was 2.93.

In the township the population was spread out, with 29.0% under the age of 18, 8.3% from 18 to 24, 19.3% from 25 to 44, 24.8% from 45 to 64, and 18.6% who were 65 years of age or older. The median age was 38 years. For every 100 females, there were 107.1 males. For every 100 females age 18 and over, there were 110.2 males.

The median income for a household in the township was $35,625, and the median income for a family was $39,375. Males had a median income of $24,063 versus $21,563 for females. The per capita income for the township was $13,827. There were 15.4% of families and 15.3% of the population living below the poverty line, including 16.7% of under eighteens and 25.9% of those over 64.
