= Mud River (Thief River tributary) =

Coordinates: 48.31108°N 96.05891°W

Location
- Country: United States

Physical characteristics
- Source
  - location: Minnesota

The Mud River is a 21.0-mile-long (33.8 km) stream of northwestern Minnesota in the United States. It flows from a point east of Grygla westwards to the Agassiz National Wildlife Refuge and the large wetlands complex surrounding Agassiz Pool. It is part of the Thief River watershed, which drains via the Red Lake River, the Red River of the North, Lake Winnipeg, and the Nelson River to Hudson Bay.

== See also ==
- List of rivers of Minnesota
