= Whiteford Township, Marshall County, Minnesota =

Whiteford Township, Minnesota
- Township
- Location of Whiteford Township, within Marshall County, Minnesota
- Coordinates: 48°26′2″N 95°56′15″W
- Country: United States
- State: Minnesota
- County: Marshall

Area
  - Total: 36.3 sq mi (94.0 km^{2})
  - Land: 33.5 sq mi (86.8 km^{2})
  - Water: 2.8 sq mi (7.3 km^{2})
- Elevation: 1,155 ft (352 m)

Population (2020)
  - Total: 41
  - Density: 1.2/sq mi (0.47/km^{2})
- Time zone: UTC-6 (Central (CST))
  - Summer (DST): UTC-5 (CDT)
- FIPS code: 27-70096
- GNIS feature ID: 0665988

Whiteford Township is in Marshall County, Minnesota, United States. The population was 41 at the 2020 census.

Whiteford Township was organized in 1910.

== Geography ==
According to the United States Census Bureau, the township has a total area of 36.3 square miles (94.0 km^{2}), of which 33.5 square miles (86.8 km^{2}) is land and 2.8 square miles (7.3 km^{2}) (7.74%) is water.

== Demographics ==
As of the census of 2000, there were 38 people, 16 households, and 13 families residing in the township. The population density was 1.1 people per square mile (0.4/km^{2}). There were 20 housing units at an average density of 0.6/sq mi (0.2/km^{2}). The racial makeup of the township was 97.37% White and 2.63% Asian.

There were 16 households, out of which 31.3% had children under the age of 18 living with them, 81.3% were married couples living together, and 18.8% were non-families. 18.8% of all households were made up of individuals, and 12.5% had someone living alone who was 65 years of age or older. The average household size was 2.38 and the average family size was 2.69.

In the township the population was spread out, with 21.1% under the age of 18, 5.3% from 18 to 24, 21.1% from 25 to 44, 39.5% from 45 to 64, and 13.2% who were 65 years of age or older. The median age was 48 years. For every 100 females, there were 81.0 males. For every 100 females age 18 and over, there were 100.0 males.

The median income for a household in the township was $49,583, and the median income for a family was $50,417. Males had a median income of $30,000 versus $0 for females. The per capita income for the township was $23,091. None of the population or the families were below the poverty line.
