= New Folden Township, Marshall County, Minnesota =

New Folden Township, Minnesota
- Township
- Location of New Folden Township, within Marshall County, Minnesota
- Coordinates: 48°20′25″N 96°18′33″W
- Country: United States
- State: Minnesota
- County: Marshall

Area
  - Total: 35.0 sq mi (90.7 km^{2})
  - Land: 35.0 sq mi (90.7 km^{2})
  - Water: 0 sq mi (0.0 km^{2})
- Elevation: 1,106 ft (337 m)

Population (2020)
  - Total: 216
  - Density: 6.17/sq mi (2.38/km^{2})
- Time zone: UTC-6 (Central (CST))
  - Summer (DST): UTC-5 (CDT)
- ZIP code: 56738
- Area code: 218
- FIPS code: 27-45538
- GNIS feature ID: 0665094

New Folden Township is a township in Marshall County, Minnesota, United States. The population was 216 at the 2020 census.

New Folden Township was organized in 1884, and named after the old Folden Municipality in Norway.

== Geography ==
According to the United States Census Bureau, the township has a total area of 35.0 square miles (90.7 km^{2}), all land.

== Demographics ==
As of the census of 2000, there were 197 people, 77 households, and 58 families residing in the township. The population density was 5.6 people per square mile (2.2/km^{2}). There were 91 housing units at an average density of 2.6/sq mi (1.0/km^{2}). The racial makeup of the township was 96.95% White, and 3.05% from two or more races. Hispanic or Latino of any race were 1.52% of the population.

There were 77 households, out of which 33.8% had children under the age of 18 living with them, 67.5% were married couples living together, 3.9% had a female householder with no husband present, and 23.4% were non-families. 22.1% of all households were made up of individuals, and 11.7% had someone living alone who was 65 years of age or older. The average household size was 2.56 and the average family size was 3.02.

In the township the population was spread out, with 26.4% under the age of 18, 4.6% from 18 to 24, 22.8% from 25 to 44, 34.0% from 45 to 64, and 12.2% who were 65 years of age or older. The median age was 43 years. For every 100 females, there were 140.2 males. For every 100 females age 18 and over, there were 119.7 males.

The median income for a household in the township was $35,625, and the median income for a family was $45,625. Males had a median income of $33,000 versus $21,528 for females. The per capita income for the township was $15,905. About 3.8% of families and 5.1% of the population were below the poverty line, including none of those under the age of eighteen and 16.0% of those 65 or over.
