= Veldt Township, Marshall County, Minnesota =

Veldt Township, Minnesota
- Township
- Location of Veldt Township, within Marshall County, Minnesota
- Coordinates: 48°24′59″N 95°40′3″W
- Country: United States
- State: Minnesota
- County: Marshall

Area
  - Total: 35.4 sq mi (91.7 km^{2})
  - Land: 35.3 sq mi (91.4 km^{2})
  - Water: 0.077 sq mi (0.2 km^{2})
- Elevation: 1,184 ft (361 m)

Population (2020)
  - Total: 45
  - Density: 1.3/sq mi (0.49/km^{2})
- Time zone: UTC-6 (Central (CST))
  - Summer (DST): UTC-5 (CDT)
- FIPS code: 27-66694
- GNIS feature ID: 0665854

Veldt Township is a township in Marshall County, Minnesota, United States. The population was 45 at the 2020 census.

Veldt Township was organized in 1902. Veldt is a name derived from Afrikaans, meaning "prairie".

== Geography ==
According to the United States Census Bureau, the township has a total area of 35.4 square miles (91.7 km^{2}), of which 35.3 square miles (91.4 km^{2}) is land and 0.1 square mile (0.2 km^{2}) (0.25%) is water.

== Demographics ==
As of the census of 2000, there were 56 people, 21 households, and 17 families residing in the township. The population density was 1.6 people per square mile (0.6/km^{2}). There were 33 housing units at an average density of 0.9/sq mi (0.4/km^{2}). The racial makeup of the township was 100.00% White.

There were 21 households, out of which 33.3% had children under the age of 18 living with them, 76.2% were married couples living together, and 19.0% were non-families. 9.5% of all households were made up of individuals, and none had someone living alone who was 65 years of age or older. The average household size was 2.67 and the average family size was 2.88.

In the township the population was spread out, with 19.6% under the age of 18, 14.3% from 18 to 24, 21.4% from 25 to 44, 26.8% from 45 to 64, and 17.9% who were 65 years of age or older. The median age was 43 years. For every 100 females, there were 124.0 males. For every 100 females age 18 and over, there were 125.0 males.

The median income for a household in the township was $35,000, and the median income for a family was $35,000. Males had a median income of $21,563 versus $33,750 for females. The per capita income for the township was $19,908. There were no families and 3.4% of the population living below the poverty line, including no under eighteens and 11.8% of those over 64.
