= Mud Lake, Minnesota =

Unorganized territory in Minnesota, United States

Mud Lake
- Unorganized territory
- Location of Mud Lake, within Marshall County, Minnesota
- Coordinates: 48°19′26″N 95°54′48″W
- Country: United States
- State: Minnesota
- County: Marshall

Area
  - Total: 36 sq mi (93 km^{2})
  - Land: 31 sq mi (81 km^{2})
  - Water: 4.6 sq mi (12 km^{2})
- Elevation: 1,145 ft (349 m)

Population (2020)
  - Total: 0
  - Density: 0/sq mi (0/km^{2})
- Time zone: UTC-6 (Central (CST))
  - Summer (DST): UTC-5 (CDT)
- GNIS feature ID: 665062

Mud Lake is an unorganized territory located in Marshall County, Minnesota, United States. In all censuses since 2000, the unorganized territory recorded a population of 0.

== History ==
Mud Lake was organized as Mud Lake Township, and named for a former lake that has since been drained.

== Geography ==
According to the United States Census Bureau, the unorganized territory has a total area of 36.0 square miles (93 km^{2}), of which 31.3 square miles (81 km^{2}) is land and 4.7 square miles (12 km^{2}) (13.03%) is water.

== Demographics ==
As of the census of 2000, there were no people living in the unorganized territory.
