= Vega Township, Marshall County, Minnesota =

Vega Township, Minnesota
- Township
- Location of Vega Township, within Marshall County, Minnesota
- Coordinates: 48°13′0″N 96°58′1″W
- Country: United States
- State: Minnesota
- County: Marshall

Area
  - Total: 44.9 sq mi (116.4 km^{2})
  - Land: 44.9 sq mi (116.4 km^{2})
  - Water: 0 sq mi (0.0 km^{2})
- Elevation: 817 ft (249 m)

Population (2020)
  - Total: 135
  - Density: 3.00/sq mi (1.16/km^{2})
- Time zone: UTC-6 (Central (CST))
  - Summer (DST): UTC-5 (CDT)
- FIPS code: 27-66676
- GNIS feature ID: 0665853

Vega Township is a township in Marshall County, Minnesota, United States. The population was 135 at the 2020 census.

Vega Township was organized in 1883, and named after the SS Vega.

== Geography ==
According to the United States Census Bureau, the township has a total area of 45.0 square miles (116.4 km^{2}), all land.

== Demographics ==
As of the census of 2000, there were 155 people, 52 households, and 42 families residing in the township. The population density was 3.4 people per square mile (1.3/km^{2}). There were 57 housing units at an average density of 1.3/sq mi (0.5/km^{2}). The racial makeup of the township was 96.13% White, 0.65% Native American, and 3.23% from other races. Hispanic or Latino of any race were 5.81% of the population.

There were 52 households, out of which 42.3% had children under the age of 18 living with them, 65.4% were married couples living together, 5.8% had a female householder with no husband present, and 19.2% were non-families. 17.3% of all households were made up of individuals, and 7.7% had someone living alone who was 65 years of age or older. The average household size was 2.98 and the average family size was 3.36.

In the township the population was spread out, with 32.3% under the age of 18, 5.2% from 18 to 24, 27.1% from 25 to 44, 17.4% from 45 to 64, and 18.1% who were 65 years of age or older. The median age was 37 years. For every 100 females, there were 106.7 males. For every 100 females age 18 and over, there were 114.3 males.

The median income for a household in the township was $51,875, and the median income for a family was $54,167. Males had a median income of $31,875 versus $20,417 for females. The per capita income for the township was $18,212. None of the families and 0.6% of the population were living below the poverty line, including no under eighteens and none of those over 64.
