= Tamarac River (Red River of the North tributary) =

Coordinates: 48.48971°N 97.13063°W

Location
- Country: United States

Physical characteristics
- Source
  - location: Minnesota

The Tamarac River is an 82.1-mile-long (132.1 km) tributary of the Red River of the North, flowing entirely within Marshall County, Minnesota, in the United States.

Tamarac River was named for the tamarac tree, via the English translation of the native Ojibwe-language name.

== See also ==
- List of rivers of Minnesota
