= Thief Lake Township, Marshall County, Minnesota =

Thief Lake Township, Minnesota
- Township
- Location of Thief Lake Township, within Marshall County, Minnesota
- Coordinates: 48°28′37″N 95°56′11″W
- Country: United States
- State: Minnesota
- County: Marshall

Area
  - Total: 36.5 sq mi (94.5 km^{2})
  - Land: 27.6 sq mi (71.6 km^{2})
  - Water: 8.9 sq mi (23.0 km^{2})
- Elevation: 1,168 ft (356 m)

Population (2020)
  - Total: 30
  - Density: 1.1/sq mi (0.42/km^{2})
- Time zone: UTC-6 (Central (CST))
  - Summer (DST): UTC-5 (CDT)
- FIPS code: 27-64552
- GNIS feature ID: 0665778

Thief Lake Township is a township in Marshall County, Minnesota, United States. The population was 30 at the 2020 census.

Thief Lake Township was organized in 1896, and named for Thief Lake.

== Geography ==
According to the United States Census Bureau, the township has a total area of 36.5 square miles (94.5 km^{2}), of which 27.6 square miles (71.6 km^{2}) is land and 8.9 square miles (23.0 km^{2}) (24.31%) is water.

== Demographics ==
As of the census of 2000, there were 48 people, 20 households, and 16 families residing in the township. The population density was 1.7 people per square mile (0.7/km^{2}). There were 39 housing units at an average density of 1.4/sq mi (0.5/km^{2}). The racial makeup of the township was 95.83% White, 2.08% Asian, 2.08% from other races. Hispanic or Latino of any race were 2.08% of the population.

There were 20 households, out of which 30.0% had children under the age of 18 living with them, 80.0% were married couples living together, and 20.0% were non-families. 20.0% of all households were made up of individuals, and 5.0% had someone living alone who was 65 years of age or older. The average household size was 2.40 and the average family size was 2.75.

In the township the population was spread out, with 25.0% under the age of 18, 16.7% from 25 to 44, 47.9% from 45 to 64, and 10.4% who were 65 years of age or older. The median age was 48 years. For every 100 females, there were 108.7 males. For every 100 females age 18 and over, there were 89.5 males.

The median income for a household in the township was $18,750, and the median income for a family was $31,875. Males had a median income of $37,500 versus $27,917 for females. The per capita income for the township was $12,304. There were no families and 4.0% of the population living below the poverty line, including no under eighteens and none of those over 64.
