= Oak Park Township, Marshall County, Minnesota =

Oak Park Township, Minnesota
- Township
- Location of Oak Park Township, within Marshall County, Minnesota
- Coordinates: 48°13′1″N 97°4′29″W
- Country: United States
- State: Minnesota
- County: Marshall

Area
  - Total: 39.3 sq mi (101.8 km^{2})
  - Land: 38.9 sq mi (100.7 km^{2})
  - Water: 0.42 sq mi (1.1 km^{2})
- Elevation: 807 ft (246 m)

Population (2020)
  - Total: 111
  - Density: 2.85/sq mi (1.10/km^{2})
- Time zone: UTC-6 (Central (CST))
  - Summer (DST): UTC-5 (CDT)
- FIPS code: 27-47878
- GNIS feature ID: 0665191

Oak Park Township is a township in Marshall County, Minnesota, United States. The population was 111 as of the 2020 census.

Oak Park Township was organized in 1883, and named for the oak groves within its borders.

== Geography ==
According to the United States Census Bureau, the township has a total area of 39.3 square miles (101.8 km^{2}), of which 38.9 square miles (100.8 km^{2}) are land and 0.4 square miles (1.1 km^{2}) (1.07%) are water.

== Demographics ==
As of the census of 2000, there were 165 people, 67 households, and 47 families residing in the township. The population density was 4.2 people per square mile (1.6/km^{2}). There were 71 housing units at an average density of 1.8/sq mi (0.7/km^{2}). The racial makeup of the township was 96.97% White, 3.03% from other races. Hispanic or Latino of any race were 3.64% of the population.

There were 67 households, out of which 28.4% had children under the age of 18 living with them, 65.7% were married couples living together, 1.5% had a female householder with no husband present, and 28.4% were non-families. 26.9% of all households were made up of individuals, and 4.5% had someone living alone who was 65 years of age or older. The average household size was 2.46 and the average family size was 2.94.

In the township the population was spread out, with 23.6% under the age of 18, 9.1% from 18 to 24, 22.4% from 25 to 44, 33.3% from 45 to 64, and 11.5% who were 65 years of age or older. The median age was 42 years. For every 100 females, there were 111.5 males. For every 100 females age 18 and over, there were 133.3 males.

The median income for a household in the township was $43,438, and the median income for a family was $46,964. Males had a median income of $43,125 versus $20,000 for females. The per capita income for the township was $23,560. About 4.4% of families and 5.1% of the population were below the poverty line, including none of those under the age of eighteen or sixty five or over.
