= Spruce Valley Township, Marshall County, Minnesota =

Spruce Valley Township, Minnesota
- Township
- Location of Spruce Valley Township, within Marshall County, Minnesota
- Coordinates: 48°25′14″N 96°10′41″W
- Country: United States
- State: Minnesota
- County: Marshall

Area
  - Total: 36.3 sq mi (94.1 km^{2})
  - Land: 36.3 sq mi (94.1 km^{2})
  - Water: 0 sq mi (0.0 km^{2})
- Elevation: 1,138 ft (347 m)

Population (2020)
  - Total: 239
  - Density: 6.58/sq mi (2.54/km^{2})
- Time zone: UTC-6 (Central (CST))
  - Summer (DST): UTC-5 (CDT)
- FIPS code: 27-62266
- GNIS feature ID: 0665688

Spruce Valley Township is a township in Marshall County, Minnesota, United States. The population was 239 at the 2020 census.

Spruce Valley Township was organized in 1888, and named for the spruce groves within its borders.

== Geography ==
According to the United States Census Bureau, the township has a total area of 36.3 square miles (94.1 km^{2}), of which 36.3 square miles (94.0 km^{2}) is land and 0.03% is water.

== Demographics ==
As of the census of 2000, there were 238 people, 94 households, and 73 families residing in the township. The population density was 6.6 people per square mile (2.5/km^{2}). There were 113 housing units at an average density of 3.1/sq mi (1.2/km^{2}). The racial makeup of the township was 99.58% White and 0.42% Asian.

There were 94 households, out of which 31.9% had children under the age of 18 living with them, 71.3% were married couples living together, 4.3% had a female householder with no husband present, and 21.3% were non-families. 20.2% of all households were made up of individuals, and 9.6% had someone living alone who was 65 years of age or older. The average household size was 2.53 and the average family size was 2.93.

In the township the population was spread out, with 25.6% under the age of 18, 5.9% from 18 to 24, 22.7% from 25 to 44, 32.8% from 45 to 64, and 13.0% who were 65 years of age or older. The median age was 40 years. For every 100 females, there were 90.4 males. For every 100 females age 18 and over, there were 96.7 males.

The median income for a household in the township was $41,364, and the median income for a family was $41,932. Males had a median income of $30,000 versus $21,607 for females. The per capita income for the township was $22,198. About 1.4% of families and 2.7% of the population were below the poverty line, including none of those under the age of eighteen or sixty five or over.
