= Warrenton Township, Marshall County, Minnesota =

Warrenton Township, Minnesota
- Township
- Location of Warrenton Township, within Marshall County, Minnesota
- Coordinates: 48°14′45″N 96°48′56″W
- Country: United States
- State: Minnesota
- County: Marshall

Area
  - Total: 35.4 sq mi (91.8 km^{2})
  - Land: 35.4 sq mi (91.8 km^{2})
  - Water: 0 sq mi (0.0 km^{2})
- Elevation: 846 ft (258 m)

Population (2020)
  - Total: 101
  - Density: 2.85/sq mi (1.10/km^{2})
- Time zone: UTC-6 (Central (CST))
  - Summer (DST): UTC-5 (CDT)
- FIPS code: 27-68206
- GNIS feature ID: 0665918

Warrenton Township is a township in Marshall County, Minnesota, United States. The population was 101 at the 2020 census.

== History ==
Warrenton Township was organized in 1879, and named for Charles H. Warren, a railroad official.

== Geography ==
According to the United States Census Bureau, the township has a total area of 35.5 square miles (91.8 km^{2}), all land.

== Demographics ==
As of the census of 2000, there were 93 people, 31 households, and 27 families residing in the township. The population density was 2.6 people per square mile (1.0/km^{2}). There were 38 housing units at an average density of 1.1/sq mi (0.4/km^{2}). The racial makeup of the township was 98.92% White and 1.08% Native American.

There were 31 households, out of which 48.4% had children under the age of 18 living with them, 80.6% were married couples living together, 6.5% had a female householder with no husband present, and 12.9% were non-families. 12.9% of all households were made up of individuals, and 3.2% had someone living alone who was 65 years of age or older. The average household size was 3.00 and the average family size was 3.30.

In the township the population was spread out, with 35.5% under the age of 18, 1.1% from 18 to 24, 31.2% from 25 to 44, 24.7% from 45 to 64, and 7.5% who were 65 years of age or older. The median age was 36 years. For every 100 females, there were 138.5 males. For every 100 females age 18 and over, there were 114.3 males.

The median income for a household in the township was $42,083, and the median income for a family was $42,500. Males had a median income of $29,375 versus $23,750 for females. The per capita income for the township was $15,356. None of the population or the families were below the poverty line, including no under eighteens and none of those over 64.
