= Spruce Grove Township, Minnesota =

Spruce Grove Township is the name of some places in the U.S. state of Minnesota:

- Spruce Grove Township, Becker County, Minnesota
- Spruce Grove Township, Beltrami County, Minnesota
