= Spruce Hill Township =

Spruce Hill Township may refer to the following townships in the United States:

- Spruce Hill Township, Douglas County, Minnesota
- Spruce Hill Township, Pennsylvania
