= Eagle Point Township, Marshall County, Minnesota =

Eagle Point Township, Minnesota
- Township
- Location of Eagle Point Township, within Marshall County, Minnesota
- Coordinates: 48°30′27″N 97°5′46″W
- Country: United States
- State: Minnesota
- County: Marshall

Area
  - Total: 28.3 sq mi (73.3 km^{2})
  - Land: 27.9 sq mi (72.2 km^{2})
  - Water: 0.42 sq mi (1.1 km^{2})
- Elevation: 797 ft (243 m)

Population (2020)
  - Total: 10
  - Density: 0.36/sq mi (0.14/km^{2})
- Time zone: UTC-6 (Central (CST))
  - Summer (DST): UTC-5 (CDT)
- FIPS code: 27-17414
- GNIS feature ID: 0664019

Eagle Point Township is a township in Marshall County, Minnesota, United States. The population was 10 at the 2020 census.

Eagle Point Township was organized in 1890, and named for an eagle's nest in a nearby grove.

== Geography ==
According to the United States Census Bureau, the township has a total area of 28.3 square miles (73 km^{2}), of which 27.9 square miles (72 km^{2}) is land and 0.4 square miles (1.0 km^{2}) (1.52%) is water.

== Demographics ==
As of the census of 2000, there were 33 people, 13 households, and 10 families residing in the township. The population density was 1.2 inhabitants per square mile (0.46/km^{2}). There were 18 housing units at an average density of 0.6 per square mile (0.23/km^{2}). The racial makeup of the township was 100.00% White.

There were 13 households, out of which 30.8% had children under the age of 18 living with them, 76.9% were married couples living together, 7.7% had a female householder with no husband present, and 15.4% were non-families. 15.4% of all households were made up of individuals, and 7.7% had someone living alone who was 65 years of age or older. The average household size was 2.54 and the average family size was 2.82.

In the township the population was spread out, with 15.2% under the age of 18, 18.2% from 18 to 24, 30.3% from 25 to 44, 15.2% from 45 to 64, and 21.2% who were 65 years of age or older. The median age was 39 years. For every 100 females, there were 120.0 males. For every 100 females age 18 and over, there were 115.4 males.

The median income for a household in the township was $40,000, and the median income for a family was $45,833. Males had a median income of $22,500 versus $23,750 for females. The per capita income for the township was $16,069. There were 20.0% of families and 20.7% of the population living below the poverty line, including 50.0% of under eighteens and none of those over 64.
