= Nelson Park Township, Marshall County, Minnesota =

Nelson Park Township, Minnesota
- Township
- Location of Nelson Park Township, within Marshall County, Minnesota
- Coordinates: 48°29′55″N 96°34′7″W
- Country: United States
- State: Minnesota
- County: Marshall

Area
  - Total: 36.2 sq mi (93.7 km^{2})
  - Land: 36.1 sq mi (93.6 km^{2})
  - Water: 0.039 sq mi (0.1 km^{2})
- Elevation: 1,014 ft (309 m)

Population (2020)
  - Total: 124
  - Density: 3.43/sq mi (1.32/km^{2})
- Time zone: UTC-6 (Central (CST))
  - Summer (DST): UTC-5 (CDT)
- FIPS code: 27-45142
- GNIS feature ID: 0665076

Nelson Park Township is a township in Marshall County, Minnesota, United States. The population was 124 at the 2020 census.

Nelson Park Township was organized in 1884, and named for James Nelson, a pioneer settler.

== Geography ==
According to the United States Census Bureau, the township has a total area of 36.2 square miles (93.7 km^{2}), of which 36.1 square miles (93.6 km^{2}) is land and 0.1 square mile (0.1 km^{2}) (0.14%) is water.

== Demographics ==
As of the census of 2000, there were 158 people, 56 households, and 44 families residing in the township. The population density was 4.4 people per square mile (1.7/km^{2}). There were 69 housing units at an average density of 1.9/sq mi (0.7/km^{2}). The racial makeup of the township was 100.00% White.

There were 56 households, out of which 39.3% had children under the age of 18 living with them, 73.2% were married couples living together, 1.8% had a female householder with no husband present, and 21.4% were non-families. 21.4% of all households were made up of individuals, and 14.3% had someone living alone who was 65 years of age or older. The average household size was 2.82 and the average family size was 3.32.

In the township, the population was spread out, with 32.9% under the age of 18, 4.4% from 18 to 24, 18.4% from 25 to 44, 26.6% from 45 to 64, and 17.7% who were 65 years of age or older. The median age was 42 years. For every 100 females, there were 100.0 males. For every 100 females age 18 and over, there were 107.8 males.

The median income for a household in the township was $35,000, and the median income for a family was $40,625. Males had a median income of $27,188 versus $26,250 for females. The per capita income for the township was $12,661. About 6.7% of families and 7.7% of the population were below the poverty line, including 11.4% of those under the age of eighteen and none of those 65 or over.
