= Espelie Township, Marshall County, Minnesota =

Espelie Township, Minnesota
- Township
- Location of Espelie Township, within Marshall County, Minnesota
- Coordinates: 48°13′24″N 95°40′14″W
- Country: United States
- State: Minnesota
- County: Marshall

Area
  - Total: 44.6 sq mi (115.6 km^{2})
  - Land: 44.6 sq mi (115.6 km^{2})
  - Water: 0 sq mi (0.0 km^{2})
- Elevation: 1,171 ft (357 m)

Population (2020)
  - Total: 30
  - Density: 0.67/sq mi (0.26/km^{2})
- Time zone: UTC-6 (Central (CST))
  - Summer (DST): UTC-5 (CDT)
- FIPS code: 27-19736
- GNIS feature ID: 0664110

Espelie Township is a township in Marshall County, Minnesota, United States. The population was 30 at the 2020 census.

Espelie Township was organized in 1903. Espelie is a name derived from Norwegian, meaning "poplar slope".

== Geography ==
According to the United States Census Bureau, the township has a total area of 44.7 square miles (116 km^{2}), all land.

== Demographics ==
As of the census of 2000, there were 58 people, 22 households, and 15 families residing in the township. The population density was 1.3 inhabitants per square mile (0.50/km^{2}). There were 23 housing units at an average density of 0.5 per square mile (0.19/km^{2}). The racial make-up of the township was 100% White.

There were 22 households, out of which 40.9% had children under the age of 18 living with them, 59.1% were married couples living together, and 31.8% were non-families. 31.8% of all households were made up of individuals, and 13.6% had someone living alone who was 65 years of age or older. The average household size was 2.64 and the average family size was 3.40.

In the township the population was spread out, with 34.5% under the age of 18, 5.2% from 18 to 24, 24.1% from 25 to 44, 22.4% from 45 to 64, and 13.8% who were 65 years of age or older. The median age was 38 years. For every 100 females, there were 132.0 males. For every 100 females age 18 and over, there were 137.5 males.

The median income for a household in the township was $43,750, and the median income for a family was $44,250. Males had a median income of $29,167 versus $19,583 for females. The per capita income for the township was $12,565. There were 9.5% of families and 13.6% of the population living below the poverty line, including 15.4% of under eighteens and none of those over 64.
