= Wright Township, Marshall County, Minnesota =

Wright Township, Minnesota
- Township
- Location of Wright Township, within Marshall County, Minnesota
- Coordinates: 48°24′40″N 96°35′15″W
- Country: United States
- State: Minnesota
- County: Marshall

Area
  - Total: 36.1 sq mi (93.5 km^{2})
  - Land: 36.0 sq mi (93.3 km^{2})
  - Water: 0.12 sq mi (0.3 km^{2})
- Elevation: 991 ft (302 m)

Population (2020)
  - Total: 93
  - Density: 2.6/sq mi (1.0/km^{2})
- Time zone: UTC-6 (Central (CST))
  - Summer (DST): UTC-5 (CDT)
- FIPS code: 27-71842
- GNIS feature ID: 0666057

Wright Township is a township in Marshall County, Minnesota, United States. The population was 93 at the 2020 census.

Wright Township was organized in 1884.

== Geography ==
According to the United States Census Bureau, the township has a total area of 36.1 square miles (93.5 km^{2}), of which 36.0 square miles (93.2 km^{2}) is land and 0.1 square mile (0.3 km^{2}) (0.28%) is water.

== Demographics ==
As of the census of 2000, there were 126 people, 52 households, and 35 families residing in the township. The population density was 3.5 people per square mile (1.4/km^{2}). There were 62 housing units at an average density of 1.7/sq mi (0.7/km^{2}). The racial makeup of the township was 99.21% White and 0.79% African American. Hispanic or Latino of any race were 0.79% of the population.

There were 52 households, out of which 25.0% had children under the age of 18 living with them, 59.6% were married couples living together, 1.9% had a female householder with no husband present, and 30.8% were non-families. 23.1% of all households were made up of individuals, and 15.4% had someone living alone who was 65 years of age or older. The average household size was 2.42 and the average family size was 2.94.

In the township the population was spread out, with 17.5% under the age of 18, 11.9% from 18 to 24, 16.7% from 25 to 44, 36.5% from 45 to 64, and 17.5% who were 65 years of age or older. The median age was 46 years. For every 100 females, there were 133.3 males. For every 100 females age 18 and over, there were 131.1 males.

The median income for a household in the township was $38,125, and the median income for a family was $41,875. Males had a median income of $36,250 versus $16,500 for females. The per capita income for the township was $15,138. There were 5.9% of families and 12.5% of the population living below the poverty line, including 20.0% of under eighteens and 30.8% of those over 64.
