= Big Woods Township, Marshall County, Minnesota =

Big Woods Township, Minnesota
- Township
- Location of Big Woods Township, within Marshall County, Minnesota
- Coordinates: 48°19′7″N 97°4′33″W
- Country: United States
- State: Minnesota
- County: Marshall

Area
  - Total: 31.0 sq mi (80.2 km^{2})
  - Land: 30.6 sq mi (79.2 km^{2})
  - Water: 0.39 sq mi (1.0 km^{2})
- Elevation: 801 ft (244 m)

Population (2020)
  - Total: 35
  - Density: 1.1/sq mi (0.44/km^{2})
- Time zone: UTC-6 (Central (CST))
  - Summer (DST): UTC-5 (CDT)
- FIPS code: 27-05842
- GNIS feature ID: 0663591

Big Woods Township is a township in Marshall County, Minnesota, United States. The population was 35 at the 2020 census.

Big Woods Township was organized in 1882, and named for the forested areas within its borders.

== Geography ==
According to the United States Census Bureau, the township has a total area of 31.0 square miles (80 km^{2}), of which 30.6 square miles (79 km^{2}) is land and 0.4 square miles (1.0 km^{2}) (1.23%) is water.

== 2000 census demographics ==
As of the census of 2000, there were 79 people, 29 households, and 26 families residing in the township. The population density was 2.6 inhabitants per square mile (1.0/km^{2}). There were 35 housing units at an average density of 1.1 per square mile (0.42/km^{2}). The racial makeup of the township was 97.47% White, 1.27% African American which is one person, 1.27% Native American. Hispanic or Latino of any race which is one person.

There were 29 households, out of which 31.0% had children under the age of 18 living with them, 89.7% were married couples living together, and 10.3% were non-families. 10.3% of all households were made up of individuals, and 10.3% had someone living alone who was 65 years of age or older. The average household size was 2.72 and the average family size was 2.92.

In the township the population was spread out, with 26.6% under the age of 18, 3.8% from 18 to 24, 22.8% from 25 to 44, 24.1% from 45 to 64, and 22.8% who were 65 years of age or older. The median age was 42 years. For every 100 females, there were 97.5 males. For every 100 females age 18 and over, there were 107.1 males.

The median income for a household in the township was $38,125, and the median income for a family was $35,833. Males had a median income of $36,250 versus $21,250 for females. The per capita income for the township was $16,392. None of the population or the families were below the poverty line.
