= Bloomer Township, Marshall County, Minnesota =

Bloomer Township, Minnesota
- Township
- Location of Bloomer Township, within Marshall County, Minnesota
- Coordinates: 48°19′59″N 96°56′47″W
- Country: United States
- State: Minnesota
- County: Marshall

Area
  - Total: 36.4 sq mi (94.3 km^{2})
  - Land: 36.4 sq mi (94.3 km^{2})
  - Water: 0 sq mi (0.0 km^{2})
- Elevation: 814 ft (248 m)

Population (2020)
  - Total: 71
  - Density: 2.0/sq mi (0.75/km^{2})
- Time zone: UTC-6 (Central (CST))
  - Summer (DST): UTC-5 (CDT)
- FIPS code: 27-06535
- GNIS feature ID: 0663616

Bloomer Township is a township in Marshall County, Minnesota, United States. The population was 71 at the 2020 census.

Bloomer Township was organized in 1882, and named after Bloomer, Wisconsin, the native home of a share of the early settlers.

== Geography ==
According to the United States Census Bureau, the township has a total area of 36.4 square miles (94 km^{2}), all land.

== Demographics ==
As of the census of 2000, there were 92 people, 30 households, and 27 families residing in the township. The population density was 2.5 inhabitants per square mile (0.97/km^{2}). There were 33 housing units at an average density of 0.9 per square mile (0.35/km^{2}). The racial makeup of the township was 95.65% White, 4.35% from other races. Hispanic or Latino of any race were 4.35% of the population.

There were 30 households, out of which 40.0% had children under the age of 18 living with them, 80.0% were married couples living together, 3.3% had a female householder with no husband present, and 10.0% were non-families. 6.7% of all households were made up of individuals, and none had someone living alone who was 65 years of age or older. The average household size was 3.07 and the average family size was 3.19.

In the township the population was spread out, with 27.2% under the age of 18, 12.0% from 18 to 24, 30.4% from 25 to 44, 25.0% from 45 to 64, and 5.4% who were 65 years of age or older. The median age was 34 years. For every 100 females, there were 114.0 males. For every 100 females age 18 and over, there were 116.1 males.

The median income for a household in the township was $33,438, and the median income for a family was $29,250. Males had a median income of $30,833 versus $14,583 for females. The per capita income for the township was $15,853. There were 7.4% of families and 6.6% of the population living below the poverty line, including no under eighteens and none of those over 64.
