= New Solum Township, Marshall County, Minnesota =

New Solum Township, Minnesota
- Township
- Location of New Solum Township, within Marshall County, Minnesota
- Coordinates: 48°13′41″N 96°17′30″W
- Country: United States
- State: Minnesota
- County: Marshall

Area
  - Total: 46.3 sq mi (119.9 km^{2})
  - Land: 46.3 sq mi (119.9 km^{2})
  - Water: 0 sq mi (0.0 km^{2})
- Elevation: 1,129 ft (344 m)

Population (2020)
  - Total: 315
  - Density: 6.80/sq mi (2.63/km^{2})
- Time zone: UTC-6 (Central (CST))
  - Summer (DST): UTC-5 (CDT)
- FIPS code: 27-45970
- GNIS feature ID: 0665113

New Solum Township is a township in Marshall County, Minnesota, United States. The population was 315 at the 2020 census.

New Solum Township was organized in 1884, and named after Solum, Norway.

== Geography ==
According to the United States Census Bureau, the township has a total area of 46.3 square miles (119.9 km^{2}), all land.

== Demographics ==
As of the census of 2000, there were 313 people, 108 households, and 83 families residing in the township. The population density was 6.8 people per square mile (2.6/km^{2}). There were 127 housing units at an average density of 2.7/sq mi (1.1/km^{2}). The racial makeup of the township was 98.40% White, 0.32% Asian, and 1.28% from two or more races.

There were 108 households, out of which 42.6% had children under the age of 18 living with them, 65.7% were married couples living together, 3.7% had a female householder with no husband present, and 23.1% were non-families. 20.4% of all households were made up of individuals, and 2.8% had someone living alone who was 65 years of age or older. The average household size was 2.90 and the average family size was 3.39.

In the township the population was spread out, with 31.6% under the age of 18, 8.3% from 18 to 24, 30.0% from 25 to 44, 24.0% from 45 to 64, and 6.1% who were 65 years of age or older. The median age was 32 years. For every 100 females, there were 111.5 males. For every 100 females age 18 and over, there were 118.4 males.

The median income for a household in the township was $43,542, and the median income for a family was $49,250. Males had a median income of $31,406 versus $20,536 for females. The per capita income for the township was $18,252. None of the families and 1.0% of the population were living below the poverty line, including no under eighteens and 33.3% of those over 64.
