= Middle River, Minnesota =

City in Minnesota, United States

Middle River
- City
- Location of Middle River within Marshall County and state of Minnesota
- Coordinates: 48°26′6″N 96°9′49″W
- Country: United States
- State: Minnesota
- County: Marshall

Area
  - Total: 0.50 sq mi (1.29 km^{2})
  - Land: 0.50 sq mi (1.29 km^{2})
  - Water: 0 sq mi (0.00 km^{2})
- Elevation: 1,142 ft (348 m)

Population (2020)
  - Total: 304
  - Estimate (2021): 304
  - Density: 611.4/sq mi (236.05/km^{2})
- Time zone: UTC-6 (CST)
  - Summer (DST): UTC-5 (CDT)
- ZIP code: 56737
- Area code: 218
- FIPS code: 27-41912
- GNIS feature ID: 0647816
- Website: https://middle-river.com/

Middle River is a city in Marshall County, Minnesota, United States, along the Middle River, from which the city took its name. The population was 304 at the 2020 census.

== Geography ==
According to the United States Census Bureau, the city has a total area of 0.48 square miles (1.24 km^{2}), all land.

The community is along State Highway 32 (MN 32). It is 22 miles north of Thief River Falls.

== Demographics ==
Historical population
Census	Pop.	Note	%±
1910	149		—
1920	324		117.4%
1930	275		−15.1%
1940	328		19.3%
1950	356		8.5%
1960	414		16.3%
1970	369		−10.9%
1980	349		−5.4%
1990	285		−18.3%
2000	319		11.9%
2010	303		−5.0%
2020	304		0.3%
2021 (est.)	304		0.0%
U.S. Decennial Census; 2020 Census

=== 2010 census ===
As of the census of 2010, there were 303 people, 148 households, and 77 families living in the city. The population density was 631.3 inhabitants per square mile (243.7/km^{2}). There were 161 housing units at an average density of 335.4 per square mile (129.5/km^{2}). The racial makeup of the city was 96.7% White, 1.0% African American, 1.3% Native American, 0.3% Asian, and 0.7% from two or more races. Hispanic or Latino of any race were 1.0% of the population.

There were 148 households, of which 20.9% had children under the age of 18 living with them, 37.8% were married couples living together, 9.5% had a female householder with no husband present, 4.7% had a male householder with no wife present, and 48.0% were non-families. 41.2% of all households were made up of individuals, and 25% had someone living alone who was 65 years of age or older. The average household size was 2.05 and the average family size was 2.82.

The median age in the city was 44.9 years. 21.5% of residents were under the age of 18; 4.8% were between the ages of 18 and 24; 23.7% were from 25 to 44; 29.4% were from 45 to 64; and 20.5% were 65 years of age or older. The gender makeup of the city was 47.9% male and 52.1% female.

=== 2000 census ===
As of the census of 2000, there were 319 people, 152 households, and 76 families living in the city. The population density was 639.9 inhabitants per square mile (247.1/km^{2}). There were 161 housing units at an average density of 323.0 per square mile (124.7/km^{2}). The racial makeup of the city was 98.75% White, and 1.25% from two or more races. 52.5% were of Norwegian, 8.6% Polish, 6.1% Finnish, 5.8% American, 5.0% Irish and 5.0% Swedish ancestry.

There were 152 households, out of which 23.0% had children under the age of 18 living with them, 36.8% were married couples living together, 9.2% had a female householder with no husband present, and 50.0% were non-families. 45.4% of all households were made up of individuals, and 22.4% had someone living alone who was 65 years of age or older. The average household size was 2.10 and the average family size was 2.88.

In the city, the population was spread out, with 23.5% under the age of 18, 7.5% from 18 to 24, 27.0% from 25 to 44, 23.5% from 45 to 64, and 18.5% who were 65 years of age or older. The median age was 38 years. For every 100 females, there were 88.8 males. For every 100 females age 18 and over, there were 89.1 males.

The median income for a household in the city was $23,929, and the median income for a family was $28,750. Males had a median income of $30,625 versus $20,179 for females. The per capita income for the city was $14,059. About 2.7% of families and 10.6% of the population were below the poverty line, including 5.0% of those under age 18 and 13.3% of those age 65 or over.
