= Marshall County, Minnesota =

County in Minnesota, United States

- County
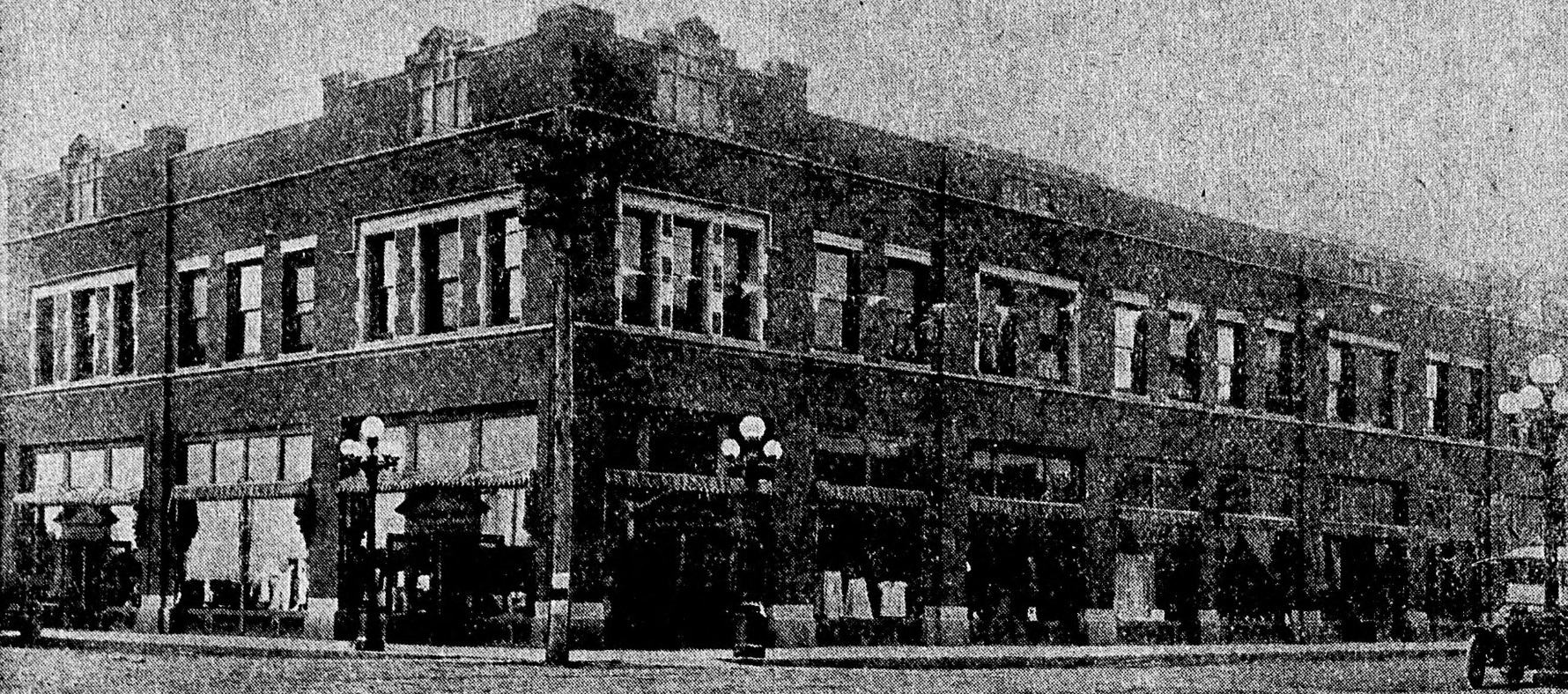
- K. J. Taralseth Company

- Location within the U.S. state of Minnesota
- Coordinates: 48°21′N 96°23′W
- Country: United States
- State: Minnesota
- Founded: February 25, 1879
- Named for: William Rainey Marshall
- Seat: Warren
- Largest city: Warren

Area
  - Total: 1,813 sq mi (4,700 km^{2})
  - Land: 1,775 sq mi (4,600 km^{2})
  - Water: 38 sq mi (98 km^{2}) 2.1%

Population (2020)
  - Total: 9,040
  - Estimate (2025): 8,798 ▼
  - Density: 5.1/sq mi (2.0/km^{2})
- Time zone: UTC−6 (Central)
  - Summer (DST): UTC−5 (CDT)
- Congressional district: 7th
- Website: www.marshallcountymn.gov

Marshall County is a county in the northwestern part of the U.S. state of Minnesota. As of the 2020 census, the population was 9,040. Its county seat is Warren.

== History ==
The Minnesota legislature created the county on February 25, 1879, with territory partitioned from the southern half of Kittson County, with Warren (which was first platted that same year) as the county seat. It was named for William Rainey Marshall, who served as Minnesota governor from 1866 to 1870.

Until May 1965, when county option was eliminated, Marshall County was a dry county; no beverages with over 3.2% alcohol could be sold.

Marshall County was the location of a claimed UFO incident in 1979, the Val Johnson incident.

== Geography ==
Marshall County lies on Minnesota's border with North Dakota (across the Red River, which flows north along the county's western border). The Snake River rises in Polk County and flows north through the western part of the county to its confluence with the Red. The Tamarac River rises in Marshall County and flows west through the county's northern area to its confluence with the Red. The Middle River also rises in Marshall County and flows west through the southern part of the county, discharging into the Snake just upstream of the Snake/Red confluence. The county terrain consists of low rolling hills, carved with drainages, completely devoted to agriculture where possible. The terrain slopes to the west and north, with its highest point near the midpoint of its eastern border, at 1,194 ft (364 m) ASL. The county has an area of 1,813 square miles (4,700 km^{2}), of which 1,775 square miles (4,600 km^{2}) is land and 38 square miles (98 km^{2}) (2.1%) is water. Marshall is one of 17 Minnesota savanna region counties where savanna soils predominate. The true high point is in the northeast of the county: CalTopo displays 1237 ft at 48.5339°N, -96.0167°W

Soils of Marshall County

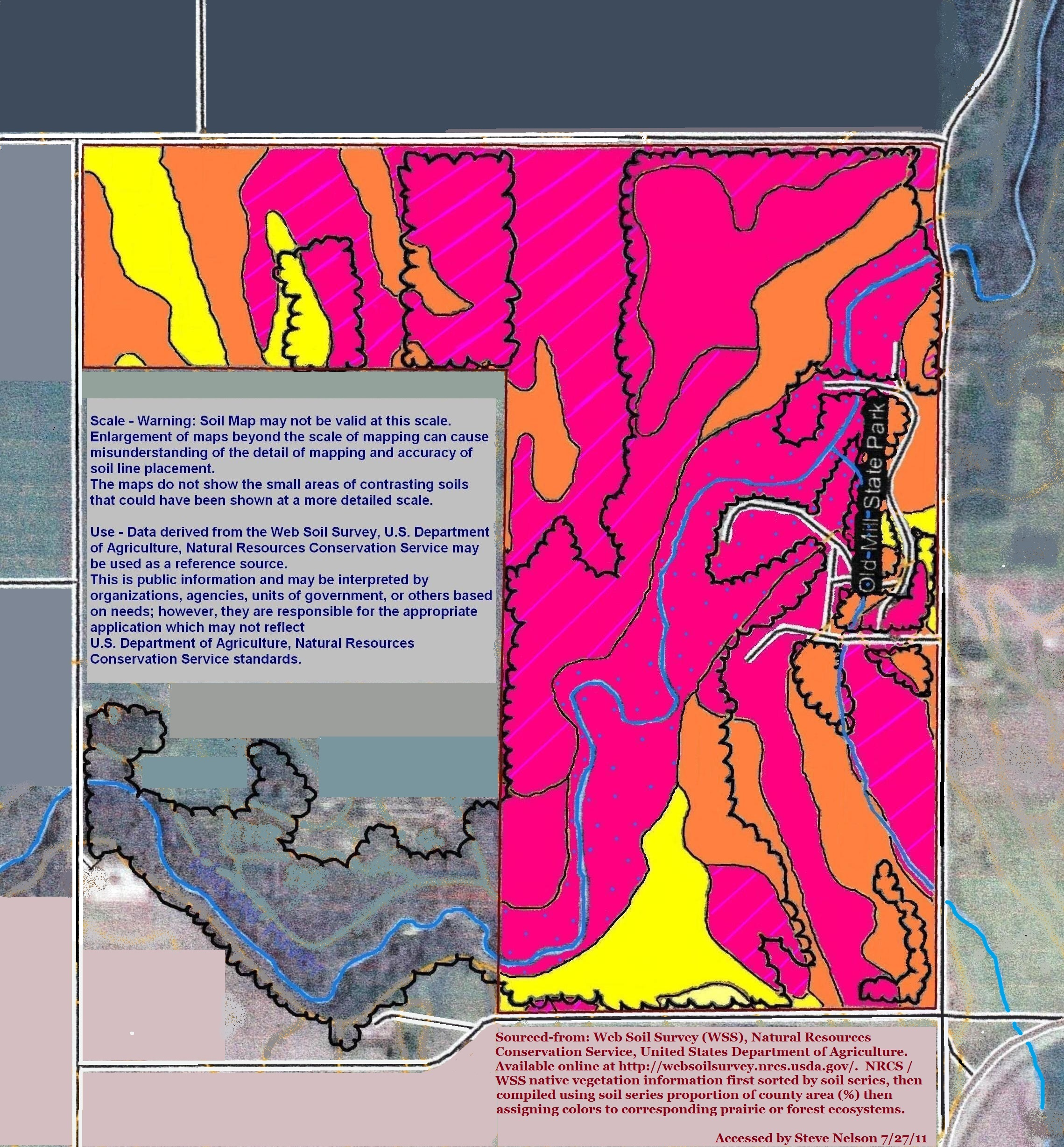
Soils of Old Mill State Park

=== Major highways ===
- U.S. Highway 59
- U.S. Highway 75
- Minnesota State Highway 1
- Minnesota State Highway 32
- Minnesota State Highway 89
- Minnesota State Highway 219
- Minnesota State Highway 220
- Minnesota State Highway 317

=== Airports ===
- Stephen Municipal Airport (D41) - northeast of Stephen

=== Adjacent counties ===
- Kittson County - north
- Roseau County - northeast
- Beltrami County - east
- Pennington County - southeast
- Polk County - south
- Grand Forks County, North Dakota - southwest
- Walsh County, North Dakota - west
- Pembina County, North Dakota - northwest

=== Protected areas ===
- Agassiz National Wildlife Refuge
  - Agassiz Wilderness
- Florian Park
- Florian State Wildlife Management Area
- Old Mill State Park

=== Lakes ===
- Thief Lake
- Webster Creek Pool

== Demographics ==
Historical population
Census	Pop.	Note	%±
1880	992		—
1890	9,130		820.4%
1900	15,698		71.9%
1910	16,338		4.1%
1920	19,443		19.0%
1930	17,003		−12.5%
1940	18,364		8.0%
1950	16,125		−12.2%
1960	14,262		−11.6%
1970	13,060		−8.4%
1980	13,027		−0.3%
1990	10,993		−15.6%
2000	10,155		−7.6%
2010	9,439		−7.1%
2020	9,040		−4.2%
2025 (est.)	8,798	▼	−2.7%
U.S. Decennial Census; 1790-1960 1900-1990; 1990-2000 2010-2020

=== 2020 census ===
As of the 2020 census, the county had a population of 9,040. The median age was 42.9 years. 23.6% of residents were under the age of 18 and 21.3% of residents were 65 years of age or older. For every 100 females there were 105.6 males, and for every 100 females age 18 and over there were 106.1 males age 18 and over.

The racial makeup of the county was 93.7% White, 0.1% Black or African American, 0.4% American Indian and Alaska Native, 0.2% Asian, <0.1% Native Hawaiian and Pacific Islander, 1.1% from some other race, and 4.4% from two or more races. Hispanic or Latino residents of any race comprised 4.3% of the population.

<0.1% of residents lived in urban areas, while 100.0% lived in rural areas.

There were 3,836 households in the county, of which 27.0% had children under the age of 18 living in them. Of all households, 53.8% were married-couple households, 21.5% were households with a male householder and no spouse or partner present, and 18.7% were households with a female householder and no spouse or partner present. About 30.5% of all households were made up of individuals and 12.9% had someone living alone who was 65 years of age or older.

There were 4,416 housing units, of which 13.1% were vacant. Among occupied housing units, 84.0% were owner-occupied and 16.0% were renter-occupied. The homeowner vacancy rate was 1.6% and the rental vacancy rate was 11.3%.

Marshall County Racial Composition
Race	Num.	Perc.
White (NH)	8,332	92.2%
Black or African American (NH)	12	0.13%
Native American (NH)	29	0.32%
Asian (NH)	19	0.21%
Pacific Islander (NH)	0	0%
Other/Mixed (NH)	258	2.9%
Hispanic or Latino	390	4.31%

=== 2000 census ===
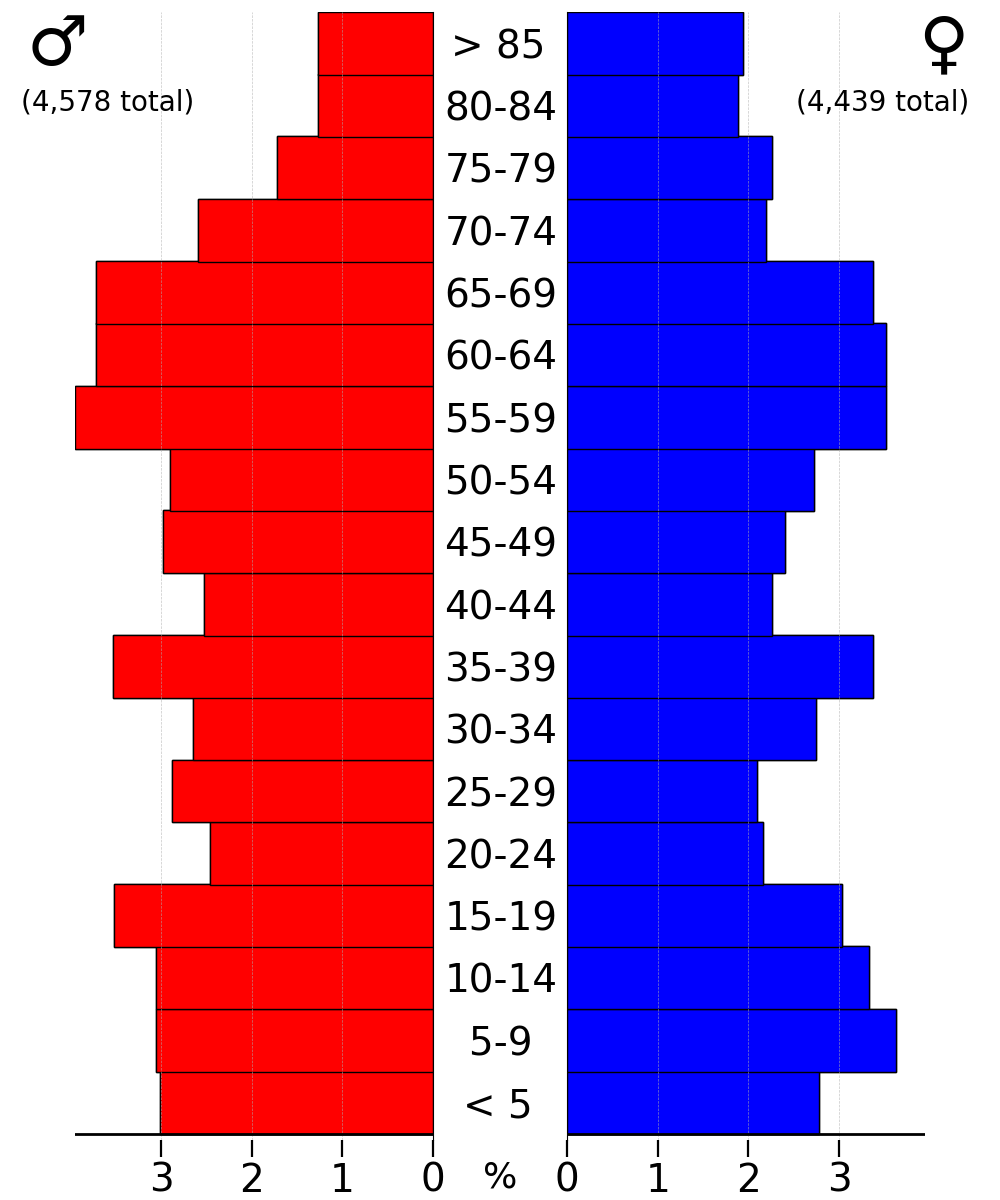
2022 US Census population pyramid for Marshall County, from ACS 5-year estimates

As of the census of 2000, there were 10,155 people, 4,101 households and 2,837 families in the county. The population density was 5.72 per square mile (2.21/km^{2}). There were 4,791 housing units at an average density of 2.70 per square mile (1.04/km^{2}). The racial makeup of the county was 97.22% White, 0.10% Black or African American, 0.29% Native American, 0.17% Asian, 1.62% from other races, and 0.60% from two or more races. 2.93% of the population were Hispanic or Latino of any race. 43.2% were of Norwegian, 12.1% Polish, 11.7% German and 9.6% Swedish ancestry.

There were 4,101 households, of which 30.20% had children under the age of 18 living with them, 60.20% were married couples living together, 5.40% had a female householder with no husband present, and 30.80% were non-families. 28.70% of all households were made up of individuals, and 15.10% had someone living alone who was 65 years of age or older. The average household size was 2.45 and the average family size was 3.01.

The county population contained 25.40% under the age of 18, 6.70% from 18 to 24, 24.70% from 25 to 44, 24.70% from 45 to 64, and 18.50% who were 65 years of age or older. The median age was 40 years. For every 100 females there were 103.20 males. For every 100 females age 18 and over, there were 102.10 males.

The median household income was $34,804, and the median family income was $41,908. Males had a median income of $30,051 versus $20,600 for females. The per capita income for the county was $16,317. About 6.90% of families and 9.80% of the population were below the poverty line, including 11.30% of those under age 18 and 12.80% of those age 65 or over.

== Communities ==
=== Cities ===
- Alvarado
- Argyle
- Grygla
- Holt
- Middle River
- Newfolden
- Oslo
- Stephen
- Strandquist
- Viking
- Warren (county seat)

=== Unincorporated communities ===
- Big Woods
- Englund
- Espelie
- Florian
- Gatzke
- Luna
- March
- Radium
- Rosewood

Townships and unorganized territory of Marshall County

=== Townships ===
- Agder Township
- Alma Township
- Augsburg Township
- Big Woods Township
- Bloomer Township
- Boxville Township
- Cedar Township
- Como Township
- Comstock Township
- Donnelly Township
- Eagle Point Township
- East Park Township
- East Valley Township
- Eckvoll Township
- Espelie Township
- Excel Township
- Foldahl Township
- Fork Township
- Grand Plain Township
- Holt Township
- Huntly Township
- Lincoln Township
- Linsell Township
- Marsh Grove Township
- McCrea Township
- Middle River Township
- Moose River Township
- Moylan Township
- Nelson Park Township
- New Folden Township
- New Maine Township
- New Solum Township
- Oak Park Township
- Parker Township
- Rollis Township
- Sinnott Township
- Spruce Valley Township
- Tamarac Township
- Thief Lake Township
- Valley Township
- Vega Township
- Veldt Township
- Viking Township
- Wanger Township
- Warrenton Township
- West Valley Township
- Whiteford Township
- Wright Township

=== Unorganized territory ===
- Mud Lake

== Government and politics ==
Marshall County has voted Republican in presidential elections since 2000, except in 2008, when Barack Obama won the county by 26 votes, or less than one percentage point. In 2024, Donald Trump became the first Republican to reach three-quarters of the county's vote since Warren G. Harding in 1920.

United States presidential election results for Marshall County, Minnesota
Year	Republican		Democratic		Third party(ies)	
Year	No.	%	No.	%	No.	%
1892	526	27.90%	354	18.78%	1,005	53.32%
1896	1,200	48.94%	1,222	49.84%	30	1.22%
1900	1,457	59.66%	905	37.06%	80	3.28%
1904	1,720	76.38%	275	12.21%	257	11.41%
1908	1,648	59.99%	731	26.61%	368	13.40%
1912	331	11.30%	567	19.35%	2,032	69.35%
1916	1,461	44.73%	1,513	46.33%	292	8.94%
1920	4,738	75.41%	885	14.09%	660	10.50%
1924	2,100	40.03%	290	5.53%	2,856	54.44%
1928	3,738	61.58%	2,200	36.24%	132	2.17%
1932	1,866	34.16%	3,259	59.66%	338	6.19%
1936	1,904	27.79%	4,802	70.08%	146	2.13%
1940	2,441	34.70%	4,549	64.67%	44	0.63%
1944	2,029	34.60%	3,808	64.94%	27	0.46%
1948	2,090	32.12%	4,126	63.41%	291	4.47%
1952	3,516	52.22%	3,132	46.52%	85	1.26%
1956	2,519	41.93%	3,478	57.90%	10	0.17%
1960	3,006	44.36%	3,759	55.47%	12	0.18%
1964	1,893	29.17%	4,594	70.79%	3	0.05%
1968	2,367	39.74%	3,161	53.07%	428	7.19%
1972	3,264	52.73%	2,790	45.07%	136	2.20%
1976	2,605	40.14%	3,744	57.70%	140	2.16%
1980	3,638	53.70%	2,636	38.91%	501	7.39%
1984	3,433	55.31%	2,705	43.58%	69	1.11%
1988	2,752	47.36%	3,001	51.64%	58	1.00%
1992	2,136	36.81%	2,309	39.79%	1,358	23.40%
1996	2,068	40.12%	2,333	45.27%	753	14.61%
2000	2,912	56.01%	1,910	36.74%	377	7.25%
2004	3,187	57.30%	2,308	41.50%	67	1.20%
2008	2,285	48.22%	2,311	48.77%	143	3.02%
2012	2,569	54.68%	1,998	42.53%	131	2.79%
2016	3,208	66.60%	1,225	25.43%	384	7.97%
2020	3,721	72.78%	1,295	25.33%	97	1.90%
2024	3,774	75.01%	1,177	23.39%	80	1.59%

County Board of Commissioners
Position	Name	District	Next Election
Commissioner and Chairperson	Jim Duckstad	District 1	2026
Commissioner	Rolland Miller	District 2	2024
Commissioner	Larry Nybladh	District 3	2024
Commissioner	Sharon Bring	District 4	2024
Commissioner	Gary Kiesow	District 5	2026

State Legislature (2023-2025)
Position	Name	Affiliation	District
Senate	Mark Johnson	Republican	District 1
House of Representatives	John Burkel	Republican	District 1A

U.S Congress (2023-2025)
Position	Name	Affiliation	District
House of Representatives	Michelle Fischbach	Democrat	7th
Senate	Amy Klobuchar	Democrat	N/A
Senate	Tina Smith	Democrat	N/A

== See also ==
- National Register of Historic Places listings in Marshall County, Minnesota
- Agassiz National Wildlife Refuge
