= Agassiz National Wildlife Refuge =

National wildlife refuge in Minnesota, United States

- IUCN category IV (habitat/species management area)
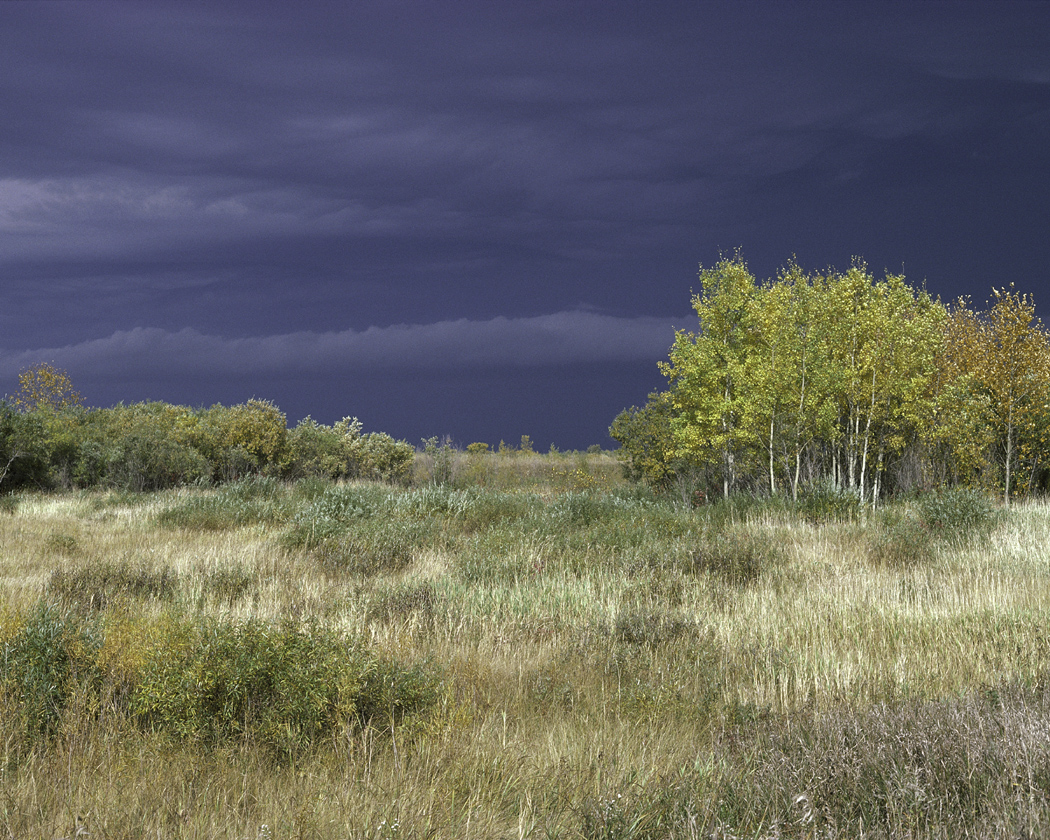
- Marshes and woodlands of Agassiz National Wildlife Refuge

- Location within the United States
- Location: Marshall County, Minnesota, United States
- Nearest city: Middle River, Minnesota
- Coordinates: 48.34996°N 95.95029°W
- Area: 61,500 acres (249 km^{2})
- Established: 1937
- Governing body: U.S. Fish and Wildlife Service
- Website: Agassiz National Wildlife Refuge

Agassiz National Wildlife Refuge is located in northwest Minnesota. Packs of wolves, moose, waterfowl, and 294 species of birds make this refuge a wildlife wonderland. 49 mammal, 12 amphibian, and 9 reptile species have also been identified.

The refuge, originally named Mud Lake Migratory Waterfowl Refuge, was established in 1937 primarily for waterfowl production and maintenance. Located in eastern Marshall County, the contiguous 61,500 acres (249 km^{2}) are situated in the aspen parkland region of northwest Minnesota. In 1976, 4,000 acres (16 km^{2}) of the refuge were designated a Wilderness Area. Each year over 20,000 visitors enjoy wildlife viewing on Agassiz Refuge.

Agassiz is composed of 37,400 acres (151 km^{2}) of wetlands, 11,650 acres (47 km^{2}) of shrublands, 9,900 acres (40 km^{2}) of forestland, 1,710 acres (7 km^{2}) of grassland, and 150 acres (0.6 km^{2}) of cropland. The Wilderness Area encompasses one of the most westerly extensions of black spruce-tamarack bog in Minnesota. Two bog lakes, Kuriko and Whiskey, lie within the area.

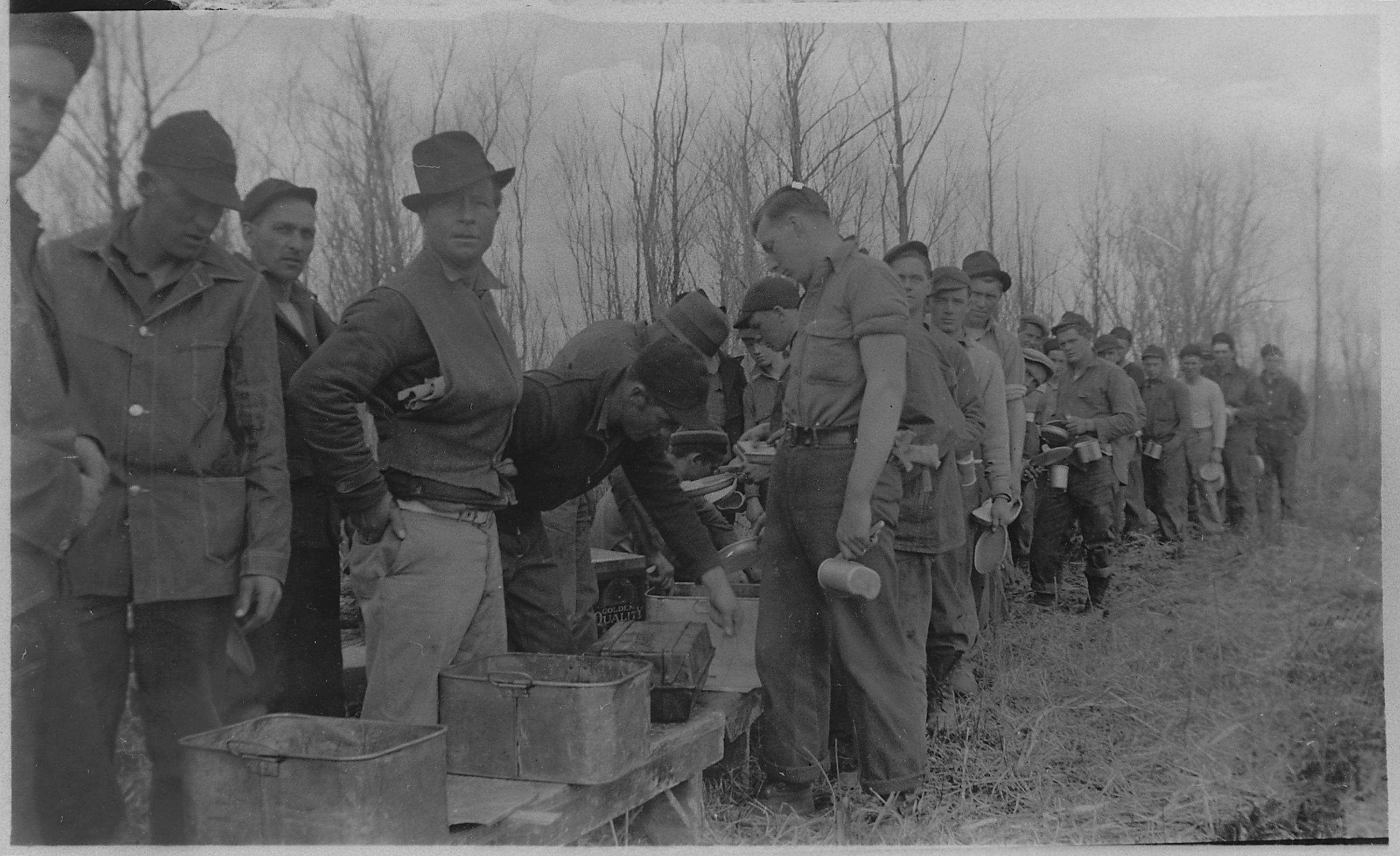
CCC workers line up for food, 1937. Mud Lake NWR, Minnesota

== Climate ==
The weather station, Goodridge 12 NNW, is located within the Agassiz National Wildlife Refuge. Goodridge 12 NNW has a dry winter humid continental climate (Köppen Dwb).

Climate data for Goodridge 12 NNW, Minnesota, 1991–2020 normals: 1150ft (351m)
Month	Jan	Feb	Mar	Apr	May	Jun	Jul	Aug	Sep	Oct	Nov	Dec	Year
Mean daily maximum °F (°C)	14.8 (−9.6)	19.2 (−7.1)	33.4 (0.8)	50.1 (10.1)	64.6 (18.1)	73.1 (22.8)	77.5 (25.3)	76.1 (24.5)	66.9 (19.4)	51.6 (10.9)	34.2 (1.2)	20.5 (−6.4)	48.5 (9.2)
Daily mean °F (°C)	4.7 (−15.2)	8.6 (−13.0)	23.5 (−4.7)	38.9 (3.8)	52.3 (11.3)	61.6 (16.4)	65.4 (18.6)	63.3 (17.4)	54.8 (12.7)	41.4 (5.2)	25.6 (−3.6)	11.9 (−11.2)	37.7 (3.1)
Mean daily minimum °F (°C)	−5.5 (−20.8)	−2.0 (−18.9)	13.6 (−10.2)	27.7 (−2.4)	40.0 (4.4)	50.2 (10.1)	53.3 (11.8)	50.5 (10.3)	42.7 (5.9)	31.2 (−0.4)	17.1 (−8.3)	3.3 (−15.9)	26.8 (−2.9)
Average precipitation inches (mm)	0.74 (19)	0.63 (16)	1.15 (29)	1.37 (35)	2.73 (69)	3.88 (99)	3.82 (97)	3.10 (79)	2.77 (70)	2.18 (55)	1.03 (26)	0.92 (23)	24.32 (617)
Source: NOAA
