= Rollis Township, Marshall County, Minnesota =

Rollis Township, Minnesota
- Township
- Location of Rollis Township, within Marshall County, Minnesota
- Coordinates: 48°25′4″N 95°47′7″W
- Country: United States
- State: Minnesota
- County: Marshall

Area
  - Total: 36.0 sq mi (93.2 km^{2})
  - Land: 36.0 sq mi (93.2 km^{2})
  - Water: 0 sq mi (0.0 km^{2})
- Elevation: 1,165 ft (355 m)

Population (2020)
  - Total: 102
  - Density: 2.83/sq mi (1.09/km^{2})
- Time zone: UTC-6 (Central (CST))
  - Summer (DST): UTC-5 (CDT)
- FIPS code: 27-55330
- GNIS feature ID: 0665450

Rollis Township is a township in Marshall County, Minnesota, United States. The population was 102 at the 2020 census.

== History ==
Rollis Township was organized in 1899, and named for Otto Rollis, a pioneer merchant.

== Geography ==
According to the United States Census Bureau, the township has a total area of 36.0 square miles (93.2 km^{2}), all land.

== Demographics ==
As of the census of 2000, there were 141 people, 62 households, and 40 families residing in the township. The population density was 3.9 people per square mile (1.5/km^{2}). There were 75 housing units at an average density of 2.1/sq mi (0.8/km^{2}). The racial makeup of the township was 97.87% White, and 2.13% from two or more races.

There were 62 households, out of which 19.4% had children under the age of 18 living with them, 64.5% were married couples living together, and 33.9% were non-families. 30.6% of all households were made up of individuals, and 11.3% had someone living alone who was 65 years of age or older. The average household size was 2.27 and the average family size was 2.88.

In the township the population was spread out, with 19.1% under the age of 18, 1.4% from 18 to 24, 27.0% from 25 to 44, 34.8% from 45 to 64, and 17.7% who were 65 years of age or older. The median age was 48 years. For every 100 females, there were 123.8 males. For every 100 females age 18 and over, there were 119.2 males.

The median income for a household in the township was $25,714, and the median income for a family was $26,875. Males had a median income of $26,250 versus $20,000 for females. The per capita income for the township was $17,254. There were 7.5% of families and 7.9% of the population living below the poverty line, including no under eighteens and none of those over 64.
