= Holt Township, Marshall County, Minnesota =

Holt Township, Minnesota
- Township
- Location of Holt Township, within Marshall County, Minnesota
- Coordinates: 48°20′11″N 96°10′56″W
- Country: United States
- State: Minnesota
- County: Marshall

Area
  - Total: 33.7 sq mi (87.3 km^{2})
  - Land: 33.7 sq mi (87.3 km^{2})
  - Water: 0 sq mi (0.0 km^{2})
- Elevation: 1,150 ft (350 m)

Population (2020)
  - Total: 120
  - Density: 3.6/sq mi (1.4/km^{2})
- Time zone: UTC-6 (Central (CST))
  - Summer (DST): UTC-5 (CDT)
- ZIP code: 56738
- Area code: 218
- FIPS code: 27-29888
- GNIS feature ID: 0664508

Holt Township is a township in Marshall County, Minnesota, United States. The population was 120 at the 2020 census.

Holt Township was organized in 1890, and named for an early settler.

== Geography ==
According to the United States Census Bureau, the township has a total area of 33.7 square miles (87 km^{2}), all land.

== Demographics ==
As of the census of 2000, there were 147 people, 61 households, and 46 families residing in the township. The population density was 4.4 inhabitants per square mile (1.7/km^{2}). There were 68 housing units at an average density of 2.0 per square mile (0.77/km^{2}). The racial makeup of the township was 99.32% White, and 0.68% from two or more races. Hispanic or Latino of any race were 0.68% of the population.

There were 61 households, out of which 26.2% had children under the age of 18 living with them, 67.2% were married couples living together, 3.3% had a female householder with no husband present, and 23.0% were non-families. 21.3% of all households were made up of individuals, and 11.5% had someone living alone who was 65 years of age or older. The average household size was 2.41 and the average family size was 2.74.

In the township the population was spread out, with 21.1% under the age of 18, 6.8% from 18 to 24, 19.0% from 25 to 44, 30.6% from 45 to 64, and 22.4% who were 65 years of age or older. The median age was 46 years. For every 100 females, there were 96.0 males. For every 100 females age 18 and over, there were 100.0 males.

The median income for a household in the township was $28,750, and the median income for a family was $30,000. Males had a median income of $32,500 versus $18,750 for females. The per capita income for the township was $13,720. There were 8.3% of families and 12.8% of the population living below the poverty line, including 23.5% of under eighteens and none of those over 64.
