= Minnesota State Highway 81 (1934) =

Former State highway in Minnesota, United States

- Former MN 81 highlighted in red

Route information
- Length: 40.3 mi (64.9 km)
- Existed: 1934–mid-1950s

Major junctions
- South end: US 75 in Hendrum Township
- North end: US 2 in Crookston

Location
- Country: United States
- State: Minnesota
- Counties: Norman, Polk

Highway system
- Minnesota Trunk Highway System; Interstate; US; State; Legislative; Scenic

Minnesota State Highway 81 was a state highway in the U.S. state of Minnesota. It ran north from what is now TH 200 to Crookston. It was eliminated when US 75 was realigned to this road in the mid-1950s.

The highway was 40 miles (64 km) in length.

== Route description ==
Highway 81 served as a north-south route between Halstad, Shelly, Nielsville, Climax, Eldred, and Crookston.

Legally, the highway was defined as Legislative Route 175 in the Minnesota Statutes § 161.115(106).

== History ==
State Highway 81 was authorized in 1934.

The number was removed in the mid-1950s when U.S. Route 75 was realigned to this road.

== Major intersections ==
County	Location	mi	km	Destinations	Notes
Norman	Hendrum Township	0.0	0.0	US 75	Southern terminus
Norman	Halstad	4.1	6.6	MN 116	
Polk	Climax	17.5	28.2	MN 220	
Polk	Crookston	40.3	64.9	US 2 / US 75	Northern terminus
1.000 mi = 1.609 km; 1.000 km = 0.621 mi
