= Good Hope Township =

Good Hope Township may refer to the following townships in the United States:

- Good Hope Township, Itasca County, Minnesota
- Good Hope Township, Norman County, Minnesota
- Good Hope Township, Hocking County, Ohio
