= Halstad =

Halstad can refer to a location in the United States:

- The city of Halstad, Minnesota
- Halstad Township, Norman County, Minnesota

== See also ==
- Halsted (disambiguation)
