= Good Hope Township, Minnesota =

Good Hope Township is the name of some places in the U.S. state of Minnesota:

- Good Hope Township, Itasca County, Minnesota
- Good Hope Township, Norman County, Minnesota
