= Hendrum =

Hendrum can refer to a community in the United States:

- Hendrum, Minnesota
- Hendrum Township, Norman County, Minnesota
