= Sand Hill River =

Coordinates: 47°35′55″N 96°51′21″W

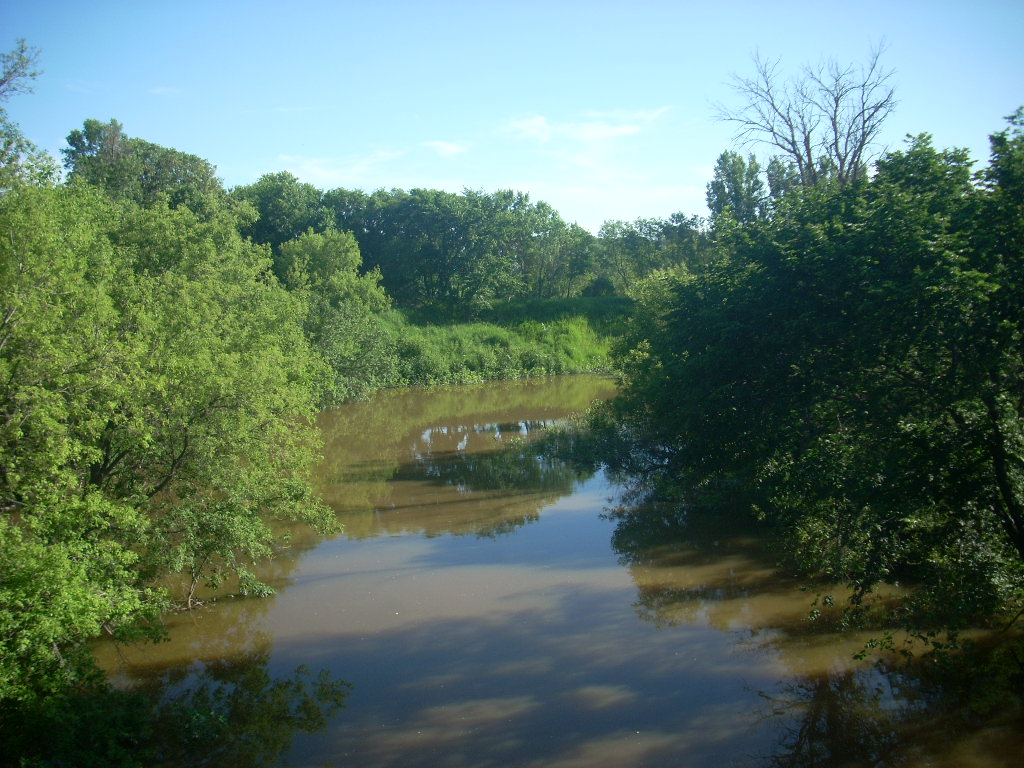

- Location of mouth

Location
- Country: United States
- State: Minnesota
- Region: Northwestern Minnesota
- City: Rindal, Fertile, Climax

Physical characteristics
- Source: Sand Hill Lake
  - location: Near Fertile, MN
- Mouth: Red River of the North
  - location: Climax, MN
- Length: 101 mi (163 km)
- Basin size: 475 sq mi (1,230 km^{2})

The Sand Hill River is a 101-mile-long (163 km) tributary of the Red River of the North in northwestern Minnesota in the United States. Via the Red River, Lake Winnipeg, and the Nelson River, it is part of the watershed of Hudson Bay, and drains an area of 475 square miles (1,230 km^{2}).

Sand Hill River was named for the sand dunes near the end of its course.

== Course ==
The Sand Hill River flows generally west from its source, Sand Hill Lake, near the town of Fosston in Polk County, dipping south through Mahnomen County and Norman County before returning to Polk County and passing the towns of Rindal, Fertile, and Climax. It flows into the Red River of the North 2 miles (3 km) west of Climax.

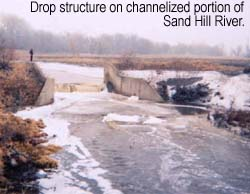

== See also ==
- List of Minnesota rivers
- List of Hudson Bay rivers

== Sources ==
- "Sand Hill River Watershed District".
