= Ida Township =

Ida Township may refer to one of the following places in the United States:

- Ida Township, Michigan
- Ida Township, Douglas County, Minnesota

== See also ==
- Lake Ida Township, Norman County, Minnesota
