= Lockhart Township =

Lockhart Township may refer to the following townships in the United States:

- Lockhart Township, Pike County, Indiana
- Lockhart Township, Norman County, Minnesota
