= Roy Johnson =

Roy Johnson may refer to:

== Sport ==
- Roy Johnson (footballer) (1891–1962), Australian rules footballer
- Roy W. Johnson (coach) (1892–1989), American coach, athletic director, and faculty member of the University of New Mexico
- Roy Johnson (pitcher) (1895–1986), American baseball pitcher and coach
- Roy Johnson (1930s outfielder) (1903–1973), American baseball player
- Roy Johnson (boxer) (1948–2024), Bermudian boxer
- Roy Johnson (1980s outfielder) (1959–2009), American baseball player
- Roy Johnson (trainer), thoroughbred trainer in the Canadian Horse Racing Hall of Fame

== Others ==
- Roy W. Johnson (politician) (1882–1947), Lieutenant Governor of Nebraska from 1943 to 1947
- Roy P. Johnson (died 1963), American Associated Press telegrapher assigned to the Fargo Forum who published an extensive series of regional history articles
- Roy L. Johnson (1906–1999), American admiral and commander in chief of the United States Pacific Fleet
- Roy Lee Johnson (1938–2024), American R&B and soul songwriter, singer and guitarist
- Roydel Johnson (born 1943), Jamaican musician, also known as Congo Ashanti Roy

== See also ==
- Roy Johnston (1929–2019), Irish physicist
