= Winchester Township =

Winchester Township may refer to the following townships

in the United States:

- Winchester Township, Norman County, Minnesota
- Winchester Township, Adams County, Ohio

in Canada:

- Winchester Township, Ontario
