= Teien =

Teien may refer to:

- Japanese garden, called teien (庭園) in Japanese
- Teien Township, a town in Minnesota
- Tokyo Metropolitan Teien Art Museum, an art deco museum in Minato, Tokyo
