= Spring Creek Township, Minnesota =

Spring Creek Township is the name of two places in the U.S. state of Minnesota:

- Spring Creek Township, Becker County, Minnesota
- Spring Creek Township, Norman County, Minnesota
