= Minnesota State Highway 81 =

Minnesota State Highway 81 was the designation for two different state highways:

- Minnesota State Highway 81 (1934), became part of US 75 in the mid-1950s
- Minnesota State Highway 81 (pre-1988), former US 52; now County Road 81
