= Andrew Aanenson =

American state legislator and farmer

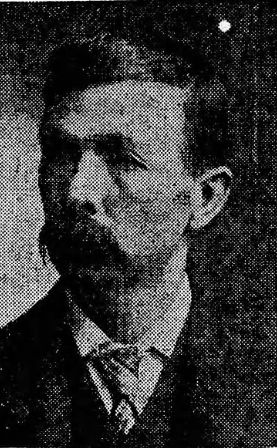
- Aanenson's portrait as it appeared in The Minneapolis Journal in 1902

Member of the Minnesota House of Representatives from the 61st district
- In office January 7, 1901 – January 1, 1905
- Preceded by: Ole Oien
- Succeeded by: John M. Hetland

Personal details
- Born: January 10, 1869 Fillmore County, Minnesota, U.S.
- Died: January 18, 1951 (aged 82) Halstad, Minnesota, U.S.
- Party: Republican

Andrew L. Aanenson (January 10, 1869 – January 18, 1951) was an American farmer and politician who served in the Minnesota House of Representatives for two terms from 1901 to 1905. A member of the Republican Party, Aanenson represented Norman County during his tenure.

== Early life ==
Andrew L. Aanenson was born on January 10, 1869, in Fillmore County, Minnesota. His parents moved to the city of Halstad when he was eight years old. He attended state common schools and high school.

== Career ==
Aanenson was involved in local Republican Party politics. He was listed as the president of the Republican Club of Shelly, his town of residence, in 1900. His biographical sketch in The Legislative Manual of the State of Minnesota also indicated that he held "numerous local offices" prior to his election to the state legislature, and that his primary occupation was as a farmer.

=== Legislative career ===
Aanenson was first elected to the Minnesota House of Representatives on November 6, 1900. He defeated Populist candidate Joris C. Norby in the race for representative of the 61st district, representing Norman County. Aanenson had 1,416 votes, or 51.58% of the total, compared to Norby's 1,329 votes for 48.42%. During his first term, he was elected to the standing committees on agriculture, military affairs, mines and minerals, public parks, and ways and means.

In a rematch, Aanenson won reelection on November 4, 1902. His margin of victory increased from his last result against Norby with 1,165 votes, or 56.14% of the share, for Aanenson and 910 votes, or 43.86% of the total, for Norby. Aanenson was appointed to the standing committees on forestry and fire protection, and public accounts and expenditures. In March 1903, he was noted to be "retiring," though he sought renomination from his in August 1904. His bid for renomination failed, and John M. Hetland earned the Republican nomination for the 1904 election.

Due to his surname appearing first alphabetically, Aanenson was the first legislator to act during roll call votes. Noted for good attendance during these votes, several state newspapers reported that when members of the legislature may have been late, they asked how Aanenson had voted. The Minneapolis Journal described him as a "hard-headed, careful man" due to his quiet demeanor.

== Death ==
Aanenson died on January 18, 1951, in Halstad. He was 82 years old.

== Personal life ==
Aanenson married Hannah Johnson in Halstad in 1903, and Aanenson remained in Halstad following the marriage. The couple had eight children: three sons and five daughters. At the time of his death, he had 21 grandchildren. He was a Lutheran.
