= Betcher, Minnesota =

Ghost town in Minnesota

Betcher
- Ghost town
- Location within Minnesota Location within the United States
- Coordinates: 47°23′0″N 96°25′46″W
- Country: United States
- State: Minnesota
- County: Norman
- Time zone: UTC-6 (Central (CST))
  - Summer (DST): UTC-5 (CDT)
- ZIP code: 56510
- Area code: 218

Betcher is a ghost town located in Green Meadow Township, Norman County, in the U.S. state of Minnesota.

== History ==
Betcher was established as a small village around 1900 by Arthur H. Betcher. A post office was established in Betcher in 1902. However, it was discontinued just five years later in 1907.

Historical population
Census	Pop.	Note	%±
1880	41		—
U.S. Decennial Census
