= Anthony Township =

Anthony Township may refer to:

- Anthony Township, Norman County, Minnesota
- Anthony Township, Lycoming County, Pennsylvania
- Anthony Township, Montour County, Pennsylvania
