= Hadler, Minnesota =

Hadler
- Unincorporated community
- Location within Minnesota Location within the United States
- Coordinates: 47°22′07″N 96°32′07″W
- Country: United States
- State: Minnesota
- County: Norman
- Elevation: 902 ft (275 m)
- Time zone: UTC-6 (Central (CST))
  - Summer (DST): UTC-5 (CDT)
- Area code: 218
- GNIS feature ID: 654740

Hadler is an unincorporated community in Pleasant View Township, Norman County, in the U.S. state of Minnesota.

== History ==
By 1900 the people of Pleasant View township wanted a place to market their produce which would be closer to their homes. Jacob Hadler was asked to go to St. Paul to get the help of the Railroad and Warehouse Commission to persuade the Great Northern Railroad to put in a station midway between Ada and Lockhart. He succeeded in this. Andrew Burley donated land for the site and was given the privilege of naming the new station. He did not do so, and it was called "Wicklow" at first; later it was changed to Hadler in honor of the man who had done so much to have it established.

A post office was established at Hadler in 1903, and remained in operation until 1908.
