= Bear Park Township, Norman County, Minnesota =

Bear Park Township, Minnesota
- Township
- Location of Bear Park Township, within Norman County, Minnesota
- Coordinates: 47°26′55″N 96°7′16″W
- Country: United States
- State: Minnesota
- County: Norman

Area
  - Total: 36.3 sq mi (93.9 km^{2})
  - Land: 36.2 sq mi (93.8 km^{2})
  - Water: 0.039 sq mi (0.1 km^{2})
- Elevation: 1,204 ft (367 m)

Population (2020)
  - Total: 172
  - Density: 4.75/sq mi (1.83/km^{2})
- Time zone: UTC-6 (Central (CST))
  - Summer (DST): UTC-5 (CDT)
- FIPS code: 27-04222
- GNIS feature ID: 0663531

Bear Park Township is a township in Norman County, Minnesota, United States. The population was 172 at the 2020 census.

Bear Park Township was organized in 1881.

== Geography ==
According to the United States Census Bureau, the township has a total area of 36.3 square miles (94 km^{2}), of which 36.2 square miles (94 km^{2}) is land and 0.1 square miles (0.26 km^{2}) (0.14%) is water.

== Demographics ==
As of the census of 2000, there were 209 people, 83 households, and 58 families residing in the township. The population density was 5.8 inhabitants per square mile (2.2/km^{2}). There were 95 housing units at an average density of 2.6 per square mile (1.0/km^{2}). The racial makeup of the township was 98.09% White, 0.48% Native American, and 1.44% from two or more races.

There were 83 households, out of which 32.5% had children under the age of 18 living with them, 63.9% were married couples living together, 3.6% had a female householder with no husband present, and 30.1% were non-families. 28.9% of all households were made up of individuals, and 19.3% had someone living alone who was 65 years of age or older. The average household size was 2.52 and the average family size was 3.14.

In the township the population was spread out, with 27.3% under the age of 18, 4.8% from 18 to 24, 25.8% from 25 to 44, 24.4% from 45 to 64, and 17.7% who were 65 years of age or older. The median age was 38 years. For every 100 females, there were 95.3 males. For every 100 females age 18 and over, there were 114.1 males.

The median income for a household in the township was $30,000, and the median income for a family was $36,250. Males had a median income of $16,000 versus $28,438 for females. The per capita income for the township was $15,431. About 14.5% of families and 17.9% of the population were below the poverty line, including 15.8% of those under the age of eighteen and 36.8% of those 65 or over.
