= Strand Township, Norman County, Minnesota =

Strand Township, Minnesota
- Township
- Location of Strand Township, within Norman County, Minnesota
- Coordinates: 47°21′50″N 96°14′23″W
- Country: United States
- State: Minnesota
- County: Norman

Area
  - Total: 35.9 sq mi (93.1 km^{2})
  - Land: 35.9 sq mi (93.1 km^{2})
  - Water: 0 sq mi (0.0 km^{2})
- Elevation: 1,106 ft (337 m)

Population (2020)
  - Total: 80
  - Density: 2.2/sq mi (0.86/km^{2})
- Time zone: UTC-6 (Central (CST))
  - Summer (DST): UTC-5 (CDT)
- FIPS code: 27-63094
- GNIS feature ID: 0665726

Strand Township is a township in Norman County, Minnesota, United States. The population was 80 at the 2020 census.

Strand Township was organized in 1880, and named for the Norwegian-language word meaning "beach".

== Geography ==
According to the United States Census Bureau, the township has a total area of 36.0 square miles (93.1 km^{2}), all land.

== Demographics ==
As of the census of 2000, there were 129 people, 49 households, and 39 families residing in the township. The population density was 3.6 people per square mile (1.4/km^{2}). There were 59 housing units at an average density of 1.6/sq mi (0.6/km^{2}). The racial makeup of the township was 84.50% White, 6.20% Native American, 2.33% from other races, and 6.98% from two or more races. Hispanic or Latino of any race were 5.43% of the population.

There were 49 households, out of which 22.4% had children under the age of 18 living with them, 57.1% were married couples living together, 8.2% had a female householder with no husband present, and 20.4% were non-families. 20.4% of all households were made up of individuals, and 4.1% had someone living alone who was 65 years of age or older. The average household size was 2.63 and the average family size was 2.92.

In the township the population was spread out, with 20.9% under the age of 18, 7.8% from 18 to 24, 27.1% from 25 to 44, 30.2% from 45 to 64, and 14.0% who were 65 years of age or older. The median age was 41 years. For every 100 females, there were 134.5 males. For every 100 females age 18 and over, there were 121.7 males.

The median income for a household in the township was $34,583, and the median income for a family was $40,625. Males had a median income of $25,833 versus $17,083 for females. The per capita income for the township was $15,214. There were 5.7% of families and 14.4% of the population living below the poverty line, including 42.9% of under eighteens and none of those over 64.
