= Lee Township, Norman County, Minnesota =

Lee Township, Minnesota
- Township
- Location of Lee Township, within Norman County, Minnesota
- Coordinates: 47°11′14″N 96°45′53″W
- Country: United States
- State: Minnesota
- County: Norman

Area
  - Total: 39.7 sq mi (102.8 km^{2})
  - Land: 39.7 sq mi (102.8 km^{2})
  - Water: 0 sq mi (0.0 km^{2})
- Elevation: 873 ft (266 m)

Population (2020)
  - Total: 118
  - Density: 2.97/sq mi (1.15/km^{2})
- Time zone: UTC-6 (Central (CST))
  - Summer (DST): UTC-5 (CDT)
- FIPS code: 27-36188
- GNIS feature ID: 0664745

Lee Township is a township in Norman County, Minnesota, United States. The population was 118 at the 2020 census.

Lee Township was organized in 1882, and named for Ole Lee, a Norwegian settler.

== Geography ==
According to the United States Census Bureau, the township has a total area of 39.7 square miles (103 km^{2}), all land.

== Demographics ==
As of the census of 2000, there were 159 people, 58 households, and 45 families residing in the township. The population density was 4.0 inhabitants per square mile (1.5/km^{2}). There were 71 housing units at an average density of 1.8 per square mile (0.69/km^{2}). The racial makeup of the township was 100.00% White.

There were 58 households, out of which 39.7% had children under the age of 18 living with them, 75.9% were married couples living together, 1.7% had a female householder with no husband present, and 20.7% were non-families. 19.0% of all households were made up of individuals, and 6.9% had someone living alone who was 65 years of age or older. The average household size was 2.74 and the average family size was 3.15.

In the township the population was spread out, with 28.9% under the age of 18, 4.4% from 18 to 24, 28.3% from 25 to 44, 26.4% from 45 to 64, and 11.9% who were 65 years of age or older. The median age was 42 years. For every 100 females, there were 117.8 males. For every 100 females age 18 and over, there were 109.3 males.

The median income for a household in the township was $49,375, and the median income for a family was $52,500. Males had a median income of $34,375 versus $25,417 for females. The per capita income for the township was $19,519. None of the population or families were below the poverty line.
