= Shelly Township, Norman County, Minnesota =

Shelly Township, Minnesota
- Township
- Location of Shelly Township, within Norman County, Minnesota
- Coordinates: 47°27′27″N 96°47′14″W
- Country: United States
- State: Minnesota
- County: Norman

Area
  - Total: 42.2 sq mi (109.2 km^{2})
  - Land: 42.2 sq mi (109.2 km^{2})
  - Water: 0 sq mi (0.0 km^{2})
- Elevation: 873 ft (266 m)

Population (2020)
  - Total: 88
  - Density: 2.1/sq mi (0.81/km^{2})
- Time zone: UTC-6 (Central (CST))
  - Summer (DST): UTC-5 (CDT)
- ZIP code: 56581
- Area code: 218
- FIPS code: 27-59584
- GNIS feature ID: 0665592

Shelly Township is a township in Norman County, Minnesota, United States. The population was 88 at the 2020 census.

Shelly Township was organized in 1879, and named for John Shelly, an early settler.

== Geography ==
According to the United States Census Bureau, the township has a total area of 42.2 square miles (109.2 km^{2}), all land.

== Demographics ==
As of the census of 2000, there were 129 people, 50 households, and 38 families residing in the township. The population density was 3.1 people per square mile (1.2/km^{2}). There were 59 housing units at an average density of 1.4/sq mi (0.5/km^{2}). The racial makeup of the township was 99.22% White and 0.78% Asian. Hispanic or Latino of any race were 0.78% of the population.

There were 50 households, out of which 32.0% had children under the age of 18 living with them, 68.0% were married couples living together, 4.0% had a female householder with no husband present, and 24.0% were non-families. 22.0% of all households were made up of individuals, and 14.0% had someone living alone who was 65 years of age or older. The average household size was 2.58 and the average family size was 2.97.

In the township the population was spread out, with 28.7% under the age of 18, 2.3% from 18 to 24, 25.6% from 25 to 44, 25.6% from 45 to 64, and 17.8% who were 65 years of age or older. The median age was 42 years. For every 100 females, there were 111.5 males. For every 100 females age 18 and over, there were 109.1 males.

The median income for a household in the township was $33,750, and the median income for a family was $41,250. Males had a median income of $21,042 versus $19,167 for females. The per capita income for the township was $18,230. There were 5.6% of families and 9.6% of the population living below the poverty line, including 7.7% of under eighteens and 11.1% of those over 64.
