= Donna Jean Christianson =

American politician (1931–2015)

Member of the Minnesota House of Representatives from the 66A district
- In office April 14, 1969 – January 4, 1971
- Preceded by: Marvin E. Christianson Sr.

Personal details
- Born: Donna Jean Andrae; October 17, 1931 Pekin, Illinois
- Died: May 11, 2015 (aged 83) Fairmont, Minnesota
- Resting place: Halstad, Minnesota
- Party: Democrat
- Spouse: Marvin E. Christianson Sr. (m. 1950; died 1969)

Donna Jean Christianson (née Andrae; October 17, 1931 – May 11, 2015) was an American politician, farmer and homemaker.

Born in Pekin, Illinois to Wilbert and Viola (née Strope) Andrae, she was a potato farmer, billing agent, and homemaker in Halstad, Minnesota. She married Marvin Christianson in February 1950. Her husband Marvin served in the Minnesota House of Representatives from 1967 until his death in 1969 from cancer. Christianson was elected in a special election succeeding her husband in the Minnesota House of Representatives. Christianson was a Democrat.

Christianson died of cancer on May 11, 2015 and had lived in Fairmont, Minnesota. Her funeral was held at Grace Lutheran Church, Fairmont, and she was buried in Halstad.
