= Alvarado, Minnesota =

City in Minnesota, United States

Alvarado
- City
- Location of Alvarado, Minnesota
- Coordinates: 48°11′37″N 96°59′50″W
- Country: United States
- State: Minnesota
- County: Marshall

Area
  - Total: 0.21 sq mi (0.54 km^{2})
  - Land: 0.21 sq mi (0.54 km^{2})
  - Water: 0 sq mi (0.00 km^{2})
- Elevation: 810 ft (247 m)

Population (2020)
  - Total: 388
  - Estimate (2021): 389
  - Density: 1,857.9/sq mi (717.33/km^{2})
- Time zone: UTC-6 (CST)
  - Summer (DST): UTC-5 (CDT)
- ZIP code: 56710
- Area code: 218
- FIPS code: 27-01252
- GNIS feature ID: 0639313
- Website: https://alvarado.municipalimpact.com/

Alvarado (/ˌælvəˈreɪdoʊ/ AL-və-RAY-doh) is a city situated along the Snake River in Marshall County in the State of Minnesota. The population was 388 at the 2020 census.

Minnesota Highway 1 and Minnesota Highway 220 are two of the main arterial routes in the community.

== History ==
A post office called Alvarado has been in operation since 1905. The city was named, directly or indirectly, after Alvarado, in Mexico.

== Geography ==
According to the United States Census Bureau, the city has a total area of 0.22 square miles (0.57 km^{2}), all land.

== Demographics ==
Historical population
Census	Pop.	Note	%±
1910	128		—
1920	361		182.0%
1930	323		−10.5%
1940	336		4.0%
1950	317		−5.7%
1960	282		−11.0%
1970	302		7.1%
1980	385		27.5%
1990	356		−7.5%
2000	371		4.2%
2010	363		−2.2%
2020	388		6.9%
2021 (est.)	389		0.3%
U.S. Decennial Census; 2020 Census

=== 2010 census ===
As of the census of 2010, there were 363 people, 137 households, and 105 families living in the city. The population density was 1,650.0 inhabitants per square mile (637.1/km^{2}). There were 177 housing units at an average density of 804.5 per square mile (310.6/km^{2}). The racial makeup of the city was 88.2% White, 0.3% African American, 0.3% Native American, 0.3% Asian, 9.6% from other races, and 1.4% from two or more races. Hispanic or Latino of any race were 16.3% of the population.

There were 137 households, of which 30.7% had children under the age of 18 living with them, 63.5% were married couples living together, 7.3% had a female householder with no husband present, 5.8% had a male householder with no wife present, and 23.4% were non-families. 21.2% of all households were made up of individuals, and 9.5% had someone living alone who was 65 years of age or older. The average household size was 2.65 and the average family size was 3.05.

The median age in the city was 34.1 years. 27.3% of residents were under the age of 18; 8.7% were between the ages of 18 and 24; 25% were from 25 to 44; 25.6% were from 45 to 64; and 13.2% were 65 years of age or older. The gender makeup of the city was 48.2% male and 51.8% female.

=== 2000 census ===
As of the census of 2000, there were 371 people, 145 households, and 100 families living in the city. The population density was 1,738.4 inhabitants per square mile (671.2/km^{2}). There were 179 housing units at an average density of 838.7 per square mile (323.8/km^{2}). The racial makeup of the city was 92.72% White, 7.01% from other races, and 0.27% from two or more races. Hispanic or Latino of any race were 10.24% of the population.

There were 145 households, out of which 36.6% had children under the age of 18 living with them, 62.8% were married couples living together, 5.5% had a female householder with no husband present, and 31.0% were non-families. 27.6% of all households were made up of individuals, and 14.5% had someone living alone who was 65 years of age or older. The average household size was 2.56 and the average family size was 3.18.

In the city, the population was spread out, with 27.2% under the age of 18, 9.7% from 18 to 24, 29.1% from 25 to 44, 20.5% from 45 to 64, and 13.5% who were 65 years of age or older. The median age was 36 years. For every 100 females, there were 84.6 males. For every 100 females age 18 and over, there were 94.2 males.

The median income for a household in the city was $40,625, and the median income for a family was $49,167. Males had a median income of $32,083 versus $19,688 for females. The per capita income for the city was $16,015. About 2.2% of families and 4.7% of the population were below the poverty line, including 3.2% of those under age 18 and 12.2% of those age 65 or over.
