= Rockwell Township, Norman County, Minnesota =

Rockwell Township, Minnesota
- Township
- Location of Rockwell Township, within Norman County, Minnesota
- Coordinates: 47°11′28″N 96°23′48″W
- Country: United States
- State: Minnesota
- County: Norman

Area
  - Total: 32.3 sq mi (83.7 km^{2})
  - Land: 32.3 sq mi (83.7 km^{2})
  - Water: 0 sq mi (0.0 km^{2})
- Elevation: 955 ft (291 m)

Population (2020)
  - Total: 53
  - Density: 1.6/sq mi (0.63/km^{2})
- Time zone: UTC-6 (Central (CST))
  - Summer (DST): UTC-5 (CDT)
- FIPS code: 27-55114
- GNIS feature ID: 0665441

Rockwell Township is a township in Norman County, Minnesota, United States. The population was 53 at the 2020 census.

Rockwell Township was organized in 1882, and named after Rockwell, Iowa, the former home of a share of the early settlers.

== Geography ==
According to the United States Census Bureau, the township has a total area of 32.3 square miles (83.7 km^{2}), all land.

== Demographics ==
As of the census of 2000, there were 78 people, 30 households, and 24 families residing in the township. The population density was 2.4 people per square mile (0.9/km^{2}). There were 33 housing units at an average density of 1.0/sq mi (0.4/km^{2}). The racial makeup of the township was 93.59% White, and 6.41% from two or more races.

There were 30 households, out of which 30.0% had children under the age of 18 living with them, 80.0% were married couples living together, 3.3% had a female householder with no husband present, and 16.7% were non-families. 16.7% of all households were made up of individuals, and none had someone living alone who was 65 years of age or older. The average household size was 2.60 and the average family size was 2.92.

In the township the population was spread out, with 28.2% under the age of 18, 2.6% from 18 to 24, 21.8% from 25 to 44, 33.3% from 45 to 64, and 14.1% who were 65 years of age or older. The median age was 40 years. For every 100 females, there were 116.7 males. For every 100 females age 18 and over, there were 115.4 males.

The median income for a household in the township was $40,500, and the median income for a family was $43,750. Males had a median income of $27,292 versus $23,750 for females. The per capita income for the township was $19,917. There were no families and 4.6% of the population living below the poverty line, including no under eighteens and none of those over 64.
