= Marvin E. Christianson Sr. =

American farmer and politician

Marvin E. Christianson Sr. (January 12, 1928 – March 8, 1969) was an American farmer and politician.

Born in Halstad, Minnesota, Christianson graduated from Halstad High School and was a dairy farmer and cattle dealer. Christianson served in the Minnesota House of Representatives as a Democrat from 1967 until his death in 1969. Christianson died of cancer at a hospital in Minneapolis, Minnesota. His wife Donna Jean Christianson succeeded her husband in a special election to the Minnesota House of Representatives.
