= McDonaldsville Township, Norman County, Minnesota =

McDonaldsville Township, Minnesota
- Township
- Location of McDonaldsville Township, within Norman County, Minnesota
- Coordinates: 47°16′24″N 96°30′56″W
- Country: United States
- State: Minnesota
- County: Norman

Area
  - Total: 34.8 sq mi (90.2 km^{2})
  - Land: 34.8 sq mi (90.2 km^{2})
  - Water: 0 sq mi (0.0 km^{2})
- Elevation: 902 ft (275 m)

Population (2020)
  - Total: 165
  - Density: 4.74/sq mi (1.83/km^{2})
- Time zone: UTC-6 (Central (CST))
  - Summer (DST): UTC-5 (CDT)
- FIPS code: 27-38978
- GNIS feature ID: 0664857

McDonaldsville Township is a township in Norman County, Minnesota, United States. The population was 165 at the 2020 census.

McDonaldsville Township was organized in 1874, and named for Finnen McDonald, a Scottish settler.

== Geography ==
According to the United States Census Bureau, the township has a total area of 34.8 square miles (90.2 km^{2}), all land.

== Demographics ==
As of the census of 2000, there were 186 people, 68 households, and 60 families residing in the township. The population density was 5.3 inhabitants per square mile (2.0/km^{2}). There were 81 housing units at an average density of 2.3 per square mile (0.89/km^{2}). The racial makeup of the township was 99.46% White, and 0.54% from two or more races.

There were 68 households, out of which 33.8% had children under the age of 18 living with them, 83.8% were married couples living together, 4.4% had a female householder with no husband present, and 10.3% were non-families. 10.3% of all households were made up of individuals, and 2.9% had someone living alone who was 65 years of age or older. The average household size was 2.74 and the average family size was 2.93.

In the township the population was spread out, with 25.3% under the age of 18, 5.9% from 18 to 24, 22.0% from 25 to 44, 29.6% from 45 to 64, and 17.2% who were 65 years of age or older. The median age was 43 years. For every 100 females, there were 113.8 males. For every 100 females age 18 and over, there were 107.5 males.

The median income for a household in the township was $48,333, and the median income for a family was $48,333. Males had a median income of $27,292 versus $30,536 for females. The per capita income for the township was $16,739. About 6.3% of families and 6.8% of the population were below the poverty line, including none of those under the age of eighteen and 6.3% of those 65 or over.
