= Fossum Township, Norman County, Minnesota =

Fossum Township, Minnesota
- Township
- Location of Fossum Township, within Norman County, Minnesota
- Coordinates: 47°17′48″N 96°7′19″W
- Country: United States
- State: Minnesota
- County: Norman

Area
  - Total: 36.0 sq mi (93.3 km^{2})
  - Land: 36.0 sq mi (93.3 km^{2})
  - Water: 0 sq mi (0.0 km^{2})
- Elevation: 1,129 ft (344 m)

Population (2020)
  - Total: 135
  - Density: 3.75/sq mi (1.45/km^{2})
- Time zone: UTC-6 (Central (CST))
  - Summer (DST): UTC-5 (CDT)
- ZIP code: 56584
- Area code: 218
- FIPS code: 27-22022
- GNIS feature ID: 0664204

Fossum Township is a township in Norman County, Minnesota, United States. The population was 135 at the 2020 census.

Fossum Township was organized in 1881, and named after Fossum, in Norway.

== Geography ==
According to the United States Census Bureau, the township has a total area of 36.0 square miles (93 km^{2}), of which 36.0 square miles (93 km^{2}) is land and 0.03% is water.

== Demographics ==
As of the census of 2000, there were 187 people, 75 households, and 62 families residing in the township. The population density was 5.2 inhabitants per square mile (2.0/km^{2}). There were 83 housing units at an average density of 2.3 per square mile (0.89/km^{2}). The racial makeup of the township was 91.98% White, 0.53% African American, 4.81% Native American, 2.14% from other races, and 0.53% from two or more races. Hispanic or Latino of any race were 3.74% of the population.

There were 75 households, out of which 28.0% had children under the age of 18 living with them, 70.7% were married couples living together, 8.0% had a female householder with no husband present, and 17.3% were non-families. 17.3% of all households were made up of individuals, and 4.0% had someone living alone who was 65 years of age or older. The average household size was 2.49 and the average family size was 2.79.

In the township the population was spread out, with 22.5% under the age of 18, 7.0% from 18 to 24, 25.7% from 25 to 44, 28.3% from 45 to 64, and 16.6% who were 65 years of age or older. The median age was 42 years. For every 100 females, there were 103.3 males. For every 100 females age 18 and over, there were 104.2 males.

The median income for a household in the township was $42,500, and the median income for a family was $44,063. Males had a median income of $31,667 versus $15,833 for females. The per capita income for the township was $16,214. About 3.6% of families and 3.7% of the population were below the poverty line, including 5.3% of those under the age of eighteen and none of those 65 or over.
