= Mary Township, Norman County, Minnesota =

Mary Township, Minnesota
- Township
- Location of Mary Township, within Norman County, Minnesota
- Coordinates: 47°11′37″N 96°37′52″W
- Country: United States
- State: Minnesota
- County: Norman

Area
  - Total: 35.4 sq mi (91.8 km^{2})
  - Land: 35.4 sq mi (91.8 km^{2})
  - Water: 0 sq mi (0.0 km^{2})
- Elevation: 890 ft (270 m)

Population (2020)
  - Total: 61
  - Density: 1.7/sq mi (0.66/km^{2})
- Time zone: UTC-6 (Central (CST))
  - Summer (DST): UTC-5 (CDT)
- FIPS code: 27-40868
- GNIS feature ID: 0664925

Mary Township is a township in Norman County, Minnesota, United States. The population was 61 at the 2020 census.

Mary Township was organized circa 1880, and named for Mary Thomas, the wife of a pioneer.

== Geography ==
According to the United States Census Bureau, the township has a total area of 35.4 square miles (91.8 km^{2}), all land.

== Demographics ==
As of the census of 2000, there were 102 people, 39 households, and 29 families residing in the township. The population density was 2.9 inhabitants per square mile (1.1/km^{2}). There were 42 housing units at an average density of 1.2 per square mile (0.46/km^{2}). The racial makeup of the township was 94.12% White, 5.88% from other races. Hispanic or Latino of any race were 5.88% of the population.

There were 39 households, out of which 38.5% had children under the age of 18 living with them, 76.9% were married couples living together, and 23.1% were non-families. 23.1% of all households were made up of individuals, and 10.3% had someone living alone who was 65 years of age or older. The average household size was 2.62 and the average family size was 3.10.

In the township the population was spread out, with 28.4% under the age of 18, 3.9% from 18 to 24, 33.3% from 25 to 44, 19.6% from 45 to 64, and 14.7% who were 65 years of age or older. The median age was 36 years. For every 100 females, there were 104.0 males. For every 100 females age 18 and over, there were 121.2 males.

The median income for a household in the township was $43,214, and the median income for a family was $44,000. Males had a median income of $38,750 versus $21,125 for females. The per capita income for the township was $16,836. There were 5.3% of families and 9.9% of the population living below the poverty line, including 14.3% of under eighteens and 9.5% of those over 64.
