= Hegne Township, Norman County, Minnesota =

Hegne Township, Minnesota
- Township
- Location of Hegne Township, within Norman County, Minnesota
- Coordinates: 47°17′32″N 96°38′19″W
- Country: United States
- State: Minnesota
- County: Norman

Area
  - Total: 35.6 sq mi (92.1 km^{2})
  - Land: 35.6 sq mi (92.1 km^{2})
  - Water: 0 sq mi (0.0 km^{2})
- Elevation: 890 ft (270 m)

Population (2020)
  - Total: 46
  - Density: 1.3/sq mi (0.50/km^{2})
- Time zone: UTC-6 (Central (CST))
  - Summer (DST): UTC-5 (CDT)
- FIPS code: 27-28178
- GNIS feature ID: 0664437

Hegne Township is a township in Norman County, Minnesota, United States. The population was 46 at the 2020 census.

Hegne Township was organized in 1881, and named for Andrew E. Hegne, a Norwegian settler.

== Geography ==
According to the United States Census Bureau, the township has a total area of 35.5 square miles (92 km^{2}), all land.

== Demographics ==
As of the census of 2000, there were 48 people, 23 households, and 16 families residing in the township. The population density was 1.4 inhabitants per square mile (0.54/km^{2}). There were 33 housing units at an average density of 0.9 per square mile (0.35/km^{2}). The racial makeup of the township was 100.00% White.

There were 23 households, out of which 21.7% had children under the age of 18 living with them, 60.9% were married couples living together, 4.3% had a female householder with no husband present, and 30.4% were non-families. 30.4% of all households were made up of individuals, and 17.4% had someone living alone who was 65 years of age or older. The average household size was 2.09 and the average family size was 2.56.

In the township the population was spread out, with 14.6% under the age of 18, 4.2% from 18 to 24, 14.6% from 25 to 44, 41.7% from 45 to 64, and 25.0% who were 65 years of age or older. The median age was 50 years. For every 100 females, there were 108.7 males. For every 100 females age 18 and over, there were 86.4 males.

The median income for a household in the township was $31,875, and the median income for a family was $45,417. Males had a median income of $16,875 versus $19,375 for females. The per capita income for the township was $17,776. There were 11.8% of families and 8.2% of the population living below the poverty line, including no under eighteens and 16.7% of those over 64.
