= Faith, Minnesota =

Faith
- Unincorporated community
- Location within Minnesota Location within the United States
- Coordinates: 47°17′13″N 96°05′56″W
- Country: United States
- State: Minnesota
- County: Norman
- Elevation: 1,145 ft (349 m)
- Time zone: UTC-6 (Central (CST))
  - Summer (DST): UTC-5 (CDT)
- Area code: 218
- GNIS feature ID: 643529

Faith is an unincorporated community in Norman County, Northwestern Minnesota, United States, dating back to circa 1868. It is located 7 miles (11 km) from Mahnomen and 65 miles (105 km) from Fargo, North Dakota.

Its history has included a flour mill, stores, blacksmith shops, school, and several other businesses.

The ZIP code for Faith is 56584, and the area code is 218.
