= Waukon Township, Norman County, Minnesota =

Waukon Township, Minnesota
- Township
- Location of Waukon Township, within Norman County, Minnesota
- Coordinates: 47°22′25″N 96°7′11″W
- Country: United States
- State: Minnesota
- County: Norman

Area
  - Total: 36.2 sq mi (93.7 km^{2})
  - Land: 36.2 sq mi (93.7 km^{2})
  - Water: 0 sq mi (0.0 km^{2})
- Elevation: 1,171 ft (357 m)

Population (2020)
  - Total: 91
  - Density: 2.5/sq mi (0.97/km^{2})
- Time zone: UTC-6 (Central (CST))
  - Summer (DST): UTC-5 (CDT)
- FIPS code: 27-68728
- GNIS feature ID: 0665939

Waukon Township is a township in Norman County, Minnesota, United States. The population was 91 at the 2020 census.

Waukon Township was organized in 1880, and was named for the Dakota language word meaning "spiritual" or "sacred".

== Geography ==
According to the United States Census Bureau, the township has a total area of 36.2 square miles (93.7 km^{2}), all land.

== Demographics ==
At the 2000 census, there were 147 people, 60 households and 43 families residing in the township. The population density was 4.1 per square mile (1.6/km^{2}). There were 68 housing units at an average density of 1.9/sq mi (0.7/km^{2}). The racial makeup of the township was 96.60% White, 2.04% Native American, and 1.36% from two or more races.

There were 60 households, of which 28.3% had children under the age of 18 living with them, 66.7% were married couples living together, 1.7% had a female householder with no husband present, and 26.7% were non-families. 23.3% of all households were made up of individuals, and 8.3% had someone living alone who was 65 years of age or older. The average household size was 2.45 and the average family size was 2.91.

24.5% of the population were under the age of 18, 4.1% from 18 to 24, 25.9% from 25 to 44, 21.8% from 45 to 64, and 23.8% who were 65 years of age or older. The median age was 43 years. For every 100 females, there were 129.7 males. For every 100 females age 18 and over, there were 122.0 males.

The median household income was $33,125, and the median family income was $37,143. Males had a median income of $19,583 versus $15,500 for females. The per capita income for the township was $17,945. There were 8.7% of families and 9.1% of the population living below the poverty line, including no under eighteens and 22.2% of those over 64.
