= Robbin, Minnesota =

Unincorporated community in Minnesota, United States

Robbin
- Unincorporated community
- Location within Minnesota Location within the United States
- Coordinates: 48°34′22″N 97°08′33″W
- Country: United States
- State: Minnesota
- County: Kittson County
- Township: Teien
- Elevation: 797 ft (243 m)
- Time zone: UTC-6 (Central (CST))
  - Summer (DST): UTC-5 (CDT)
- ZIP code: 56733 and 56720
- Area code: 218
- GNIS feature ID: 650161

Robbin is an unincorporated community in Teien Township, Kittson County, Minnesota, United States.

The community is located along the Red River, near Drayton, North Dakota. It is located along State Highway 11 (MN 11) near its junction with State Highway 220 (MN 220) and Kittson County Road 7. Nearby places also include Donaldson and Kennedy.
