= Borup, Minnesota =

City in Minnesota, United States

- City
- Location of Borup, Minnesota
- Coordinates: 47°10′50″N 96°30′18″W
- Country: United States
- State: Minnesota
- County: Norman
- Platted: 1899
- Incorporated: February 15, 1951

Government
  - Mayor: William Hennen

Area
  - Total: 0.254 sq mi (0.657 km^{2})
  - Land: 0.254 sq mi (0.657 km^{2})
  - Water: 0 sq mi (0.000 km^{2})
- Elevation: 909 ft (277 m)

Population (2020)
  - Total: 96
  - Estimate (2022): 96
  - Density: 378.3/sq mi (146.08/km^{2})
- Time zone: UTC−6 (Central (CST))
  - Summer (DST): UTC−5 (CDT)
- ZIP Code: 56519
- Area code: 218
- FIPS code: 27-07030
- GNIS feature ID: 0640389
- Sales tax: 7.375%

Borup is a city in Norman County, Minnesota, United States. The population was 96 at the 2020 census.

== History ==
The city was named for Charles William Wulff Borup, a Minnesota banker. A post office called Borup has been in operation since 1896.

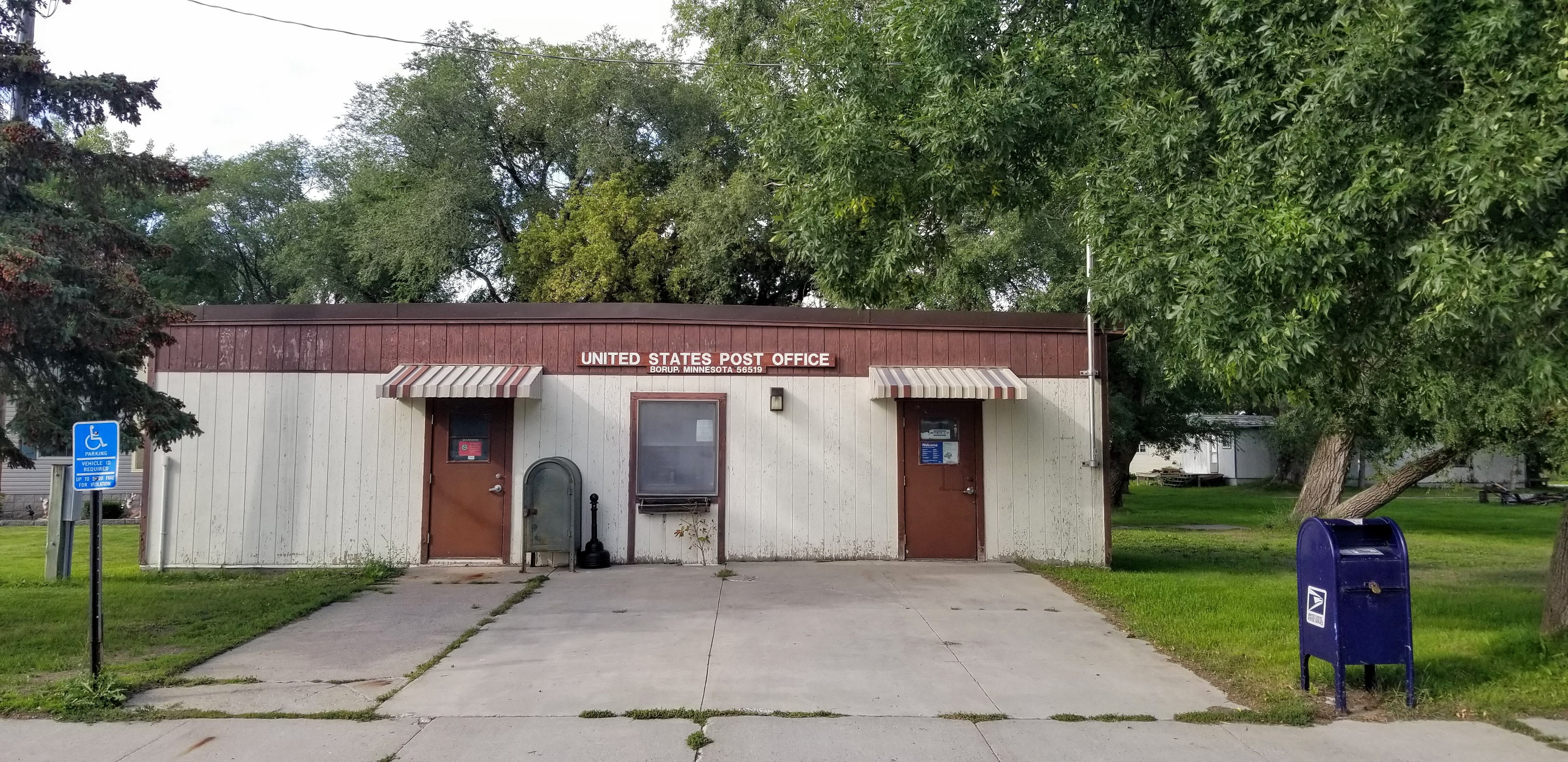
The Borup post office.

== Geography ==
According to the United States Census Bureau, the city has a total area of 0.254 square miles (0.66 km^{2}), all land.

Minnesota State Highway 9 serves as a main route in the community.

== Demographics ==
Historical population
Census	Pop.	Note	%±
1960	145		—
1970	128		−11.7%
1980	160		25.0%
1990	119		−25.6%
2000	91		−23.5%
2010	110		20.9%
2020	96		−12.7%
2022 (est.)	96		0.0%
U.S. Decennial Census; 2020 Census

=== 2010 census ===
As of the 2010 census, there were 110 people, 37 households, and 27 families living in the city. The population density was 440.0 inhabitants per square mile (169.9/km^{2}). There were 51 housing units at an average density of 204.0 per square mile (78.8/km^{2}). The racial makeup of the city was 97.3% White, 1.8% Native American, and 0.9% from two or more races. Hispanic or Latino of any race were 5.5% of the population.

There were 37 households, of which 40.5% had children under the age of 18 living with them, 62.2% were married couples living together, 10.8% had a female householder with no husband present, and 27.0% were non-families. 21.6% of all households were made up of individuals, and 8.1% had someone living alone who was 65 years of age or older. The average household size was 2.97 and the average family size was 3.63.

The median age in the city was 28.8 years. 37.3% of residents were under the age of 18; 7.2% were between the ages of 18 and 24; 20.9% were from 25 to 44; 21.8% were from 45 to 64; and 12.7% were 65 years of age or older. The gender makeup of the city was 52.7% male and 47.3% female.

=== 2000 census ===
As of the 2000 census, there were 91 people, 38 households, and 22 families living in the city. The population density was 372.7 inhabitants per square mile (143.9/km^{2}). There were 50 housing units at an average density of 204.8 per square mile (79.1/km^{2}). The racial makeup of the city was 86.81% White, 2.20% Native American, 2.20% Asian, and 8.79% from two or more races.

There were 38 households, out of which 28.9% had children under the age of 18 living with them, 57.9% were married couples living together, 2.6% had a female householder with no husband present, and 39.5% were non-families. 39.5% of all households were made up of individuals, and 10.5% had someone living alone who was 65 years of age or older. The average household size was 2.39 and the average family size was 3.26.

In the city, the population was spread out, with 27.5% under the age of 18, 9.9% from 18 to 24, 26.4% from 25 to 44, 20.9% from 45 to 64, and 15.4% who were 65 years of age or older. The median age was 36 years. For every 100 females, there were 116.7 males. For every 100 females age 18 and over, there were 135.7 males.

The median income for a household in the city was $41,042, and the median income for a family was $41,875. Males had a median income of $32,083 versus $22,083 for females. The per capita income for the city was $17,081. None of the population or the families were below the poverty line.
