= Wild Rice Township, Norman County, Minnesota =

Wild Rice Township, Minnesota
- Township
- Location of Wild Rice Township, within Norman County, Minnesota
- Coordinates: 47°16′35″N 96°15′23″W
- Country: United States
- State: Minnesota
- County: Norman

Area
  - Total: 35.3 sq mi (91.4 km^{2})
  - Land: 35.3 sq mi (91.4 km^{2})
  - Water: 0 sq mi (0.0 km^{2})
- Elevation: 1,070 ft (326 m)

Population (2020)
  - Total: 273
  - Density: 7.74/sq mi (2.99/km^{2})
- Time zone: UTC-6 (Central (CST))
  - Summer (DST): UTC-5 (CDT)
- FIPS code: 27-70276
- GNIS feature ID: 0665993

Wild Rice Township is a township in Norman County, Minnesota, United States. The population was 273 at the 2020 census.

Wild Rice Township was organized in 1881, and named for the Wild Rice River.

== Geography ==
According to the United States Census Bureau, the township has a total area of 35.3 square miles (91.3 km^{2}), all land.

== Demographics ==
As of the census of 2000, there were 334 people, 125 households, and 93 families residing in the township. The population density was 9.5 people per square mile (3.7/km^{2}). There were 139 housing units at an average density of 3.9/sq mi (1.5/km^{2}). The racial makeup of the township was 97.01% White, 2.69% Native American, 0.30% from other races. Hispanic or Latino of any race were 2.10% of the population.

There were 125 households, out of which 36.8% had children under the age of 18 living with them, 68.0% were married couples living together, 5.6% had a female householder with no husband present, and 24.8% were non-families. 21.6% of all households were made up of individuals, and 8.8% had someone living alone who was 65 years of age or older. The average household size was 2.67 and the average family size was 3.10.

In the township the population was spread out, with 28.1% under the age of 18, 8.1% from 18 to 24, 23.4% from 25 to 44, 26.0% from 45 to 64, and 14.4% who were 65 years of age or older. The median age was 38 years. For every 100 females, there were 122.7 males. For every 100 females age 18 and over, there were 116.2 males.

The median income for a household in the township was $35,625, and the median income for a family was $41,161. Males had a median income of $29,167 versus $19,821 for females. The per capita income for the township was $13,530. About 2.1% of families and 7.3% of the population were below the poverty line, including 4.5% of those under age 18 and 13.9% of those age 65 or over.
