= Sundal Township, Norman County, Minnesota =

Sundal Township, Minnesota
- Township
- Location of Sundal Township, within Norman County, Minnesota
- Coordinates: 47°28′17″N 96°15′42″W
- Country: United States
- State: Minnesota
- County: Norman

Area
  - Total: 35.7 sq mi (92.4 km^{2})
  - Land: 35.7 sq mi (92.4 km^{2})
  - Water: 0 sq mi (0.0 km^{2})
- Elevation: 1,135 ft (346 m)

Population (2020)
  - Total: 152
  - Density: 4.26/sq mi (1.65/km^{2})
- Time zone: UTC-6 (Central (CST))
  - Summer (DST): UTC-5 (CDT)
- FIPS code: 27-63508
- GNIS feature ID: 0665741

Sundal Township is a township in Norman County, Minnesota, United States. The population was 152 at the 2020 census.

Sundal Township was organized in 1880, and named after Sundal, in Norway.

== Geography ==
The township has a total area of 35.7 square miles (92.4 km2), all land.

== Demographics ==
As of the census of 2000, there were 145 people, 53 households, and 40 families residing in the township. The population density was 4.1 people per square mile (1.6/km^{2}). There were 67 housing units at an average density of 1.9/sq mi (0.7/km^{2}). The racial makeup of the township was 95.86% White, 0.69% Native American, and 3.45% from two or more races.

There were 53 households, out of which 41.5% had children under the age of 18 living with them, 69.8% were married couples living together, 5.7% had a female householder with no husband present, and 24.5% were non-families. 24.5% of all households were made up of individuals, and 9.4% had someone living alone who was 65 years of age or older. The average household size was 2.74 and the average family size was 3.28.

In the township the population was spread out, with 31.0% under the age of 18, 3.4% from 18 to 24, 28.3% from 25 to 44, 25.5% from 45 to 64, and 11.7% who were 65 years of age or older. The median age was 40 years. For every 100 females, there were 123.1 males. For every 100 females age 18 and over, there were 122.2 males.

The median income for a household in the township was $48,750, and the median income for a family was $49,250. Males had a median income of $36,250 versus $15,625 for females. The per capita income for the township was $14,578. There were 9.3% of families and 9.6% of the population living below the poverty line, including 12.9% of under eighteens and 10.0% of those over 64.
