= Climax, Minnesota =

City in Minnesota, United States

- City
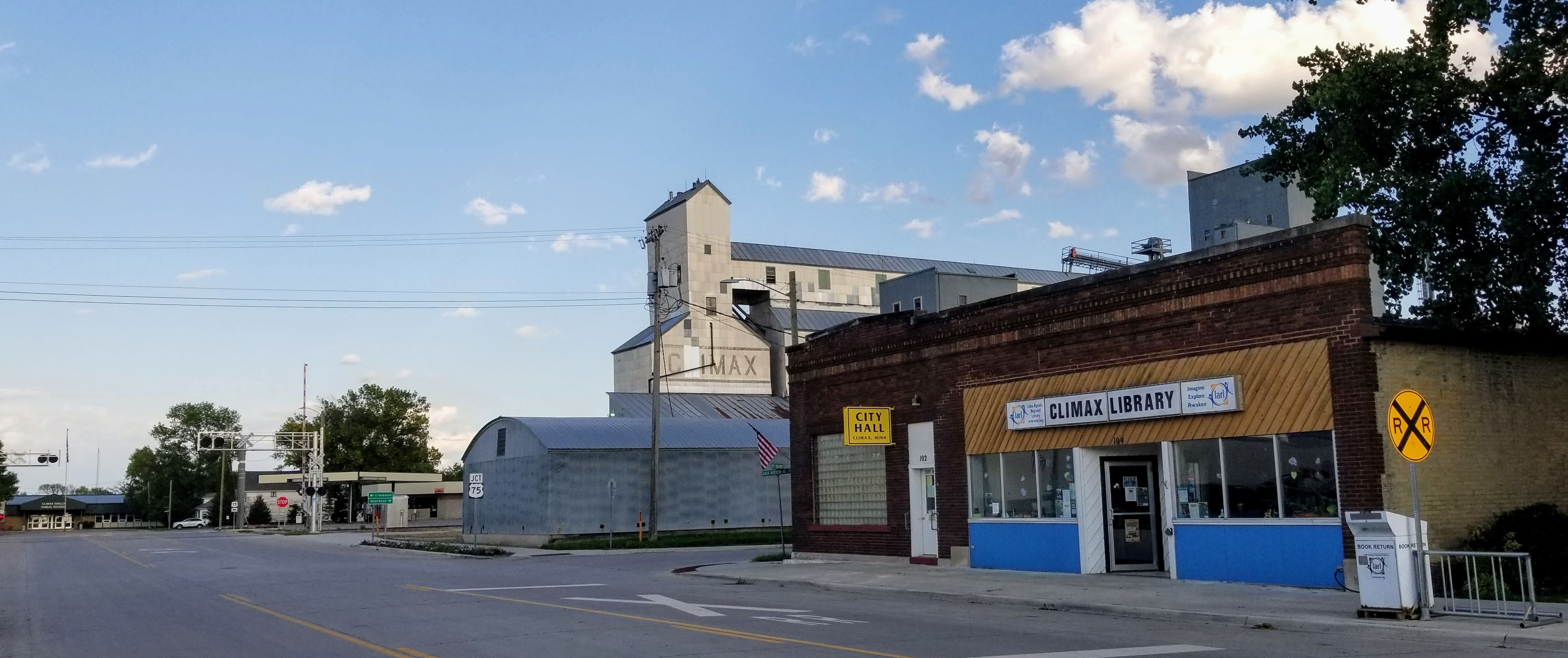
- Broadway (Highway 220) in Climax, including City Hall (2021)

- Location of Climax, Minnesota
- Coordinates: 47°36′34″N 96°48′44″W
- Country: United States
- State: Minnesota
- County: Polk
- Founded: 1896
- Incorporated: August 18, 1897

Government
  - Mayor: Jim Litch

Area
  - Total: 0.938 sq mi (2.429 km^{2})
  - Land: 0.938 sq mi (2.429 km^{2})
  - Water: 0 sq mi (0.000 km^{2})
- Elevation: 866 ft (264 m)

Population (2020)
  - Total: 243
  - Estimate (2022): 243
  - Density: 259.1/sq mi (100.05/km^{2})
- Time zone: UTC−6 (Central (CST))
  - Summer (DST): UTC−5 (CDT)
- ZIP Code: 56523
- Area code: 218
- FIPS code: 27-11962
- GNIS feature ID: 2393565
- Sales tax: 7.375%

Climax is a city in Polk County, Minnesota, United States. It is part of the Grand Forks, ND-MN Metropolitan Statistical Area. The population was 243 at the 2020 census.

== Geography ==
According to the United States Census Bureau, the city has a total area of 1.14 square miles (2.95 km^{2}), all land. It is located on the Sand Hill River, which joins the Red River of the North about two miles (3 km) to the west.

U.S. Highway 75 and Minnesota Highway 220 are two of the main routes in the community.

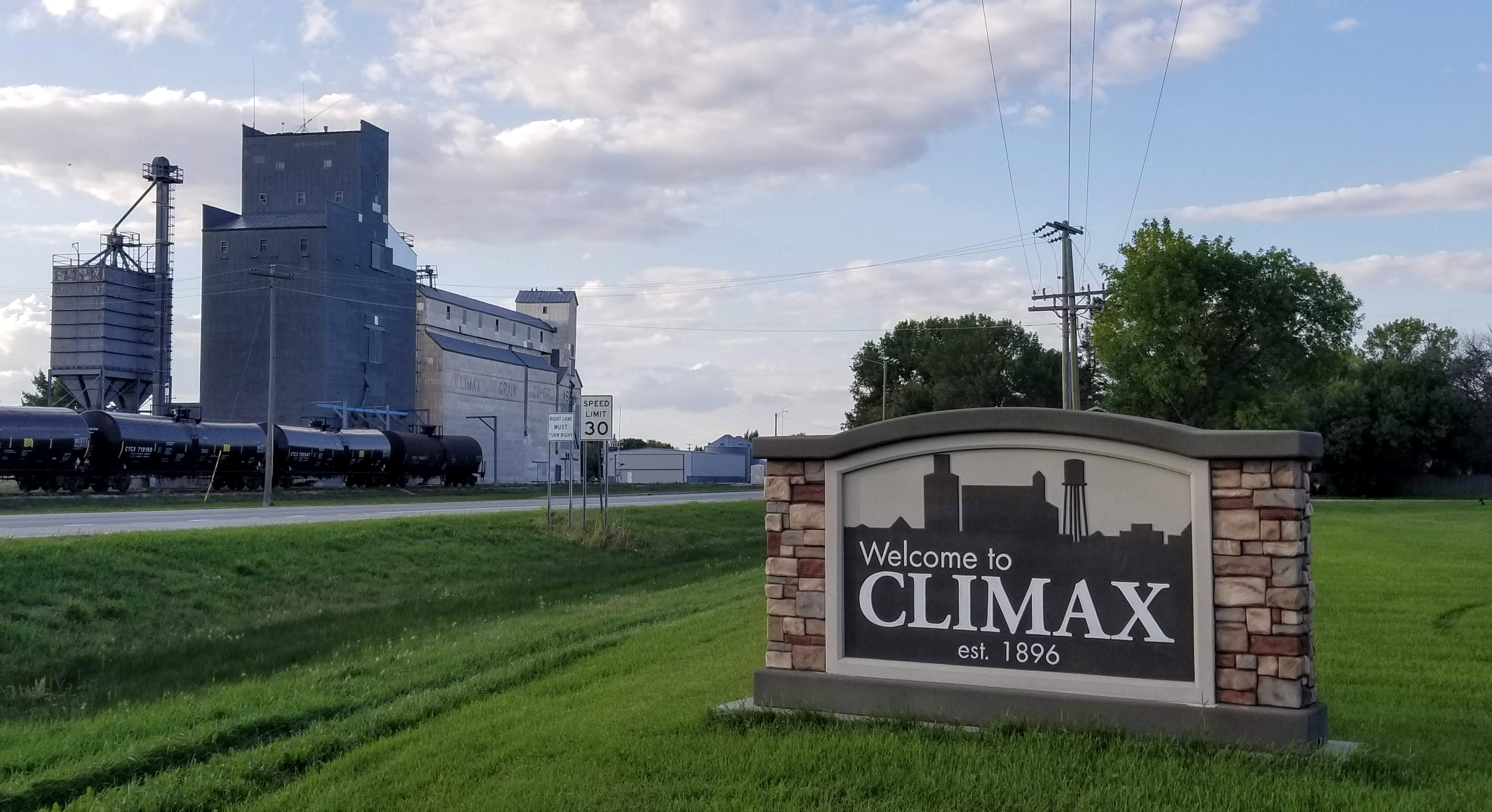
Sign welcoming visitors to Climax.

== Demographics ==
Historical population
Census	Pop.	Note	%±
1900	259		—
1910	269		3.9%
1920	274		1.9%
1930	239		−12.8%
1940	253		5.9%
1950	271		7.1%
1960	310		14.4%
1970	255		−17.7%
1980	273		7.1%
1990	264		−3.3%
2000	243		−8.0%
2010	267		9.9%
2020	243		−9.0%
2022 (est.)	243		0.0%
U.S. Decennial Census; 2020 Census

=== 2010 census ===
As of the 2010 census, there were 267 people, 112 households, and 63 families living in the city. The population density was 234.2 inhabitants per square mile (90.4/km^{2}). There were 118 housing units at an average density of 103.5 per square mile (40.0/km^{2}). The racial makeup of the city was 94.4% White, 1.9% African American, 0.7% Native American, 1.1% from other races, and 1.9% from two or more races. Hispanic or Latino of any race were 6.7% of the population.

There were 112 households, of which 35.7% had children under the age of 18 living with them, 39.3% were married couples living together, 12.5% had a female householder with no husband present, 4.5% had a male householder with no wife present, and 43.8% were non-families. 39.3% of all households were made up of individuals, and 11.6% had someone living alone who was 65 years of age or older. The average household size was 2.38 and the average family size was 3.30.

The median age in the city was 32.1 years. 31.1% of residents were under the age of 18; 6.3% were between the ages of 18 and 24; 26.6% were from 25 to 44; 25.1% were from 45 to 64; and 10.9% were 65 years of age or older. The gender makeup of the city was 51.3% male and 48.7% female.

=== 2000 census ===
As of the 2000 census, there were 243 people, 113 households, and 68 families living in the city. The population density was 212.2 inhabitants per square mile (81.9/km^{2}). There were 124 housing units at an average density of 108.3 per square mile (41.8/km^{2}). The racial makeup of the city was 93.00% White, 1.65% Native American, 4.12% from other races, and 1.23% from two or more races. Hispanic or Latino of any race were 6.58% of the population.

There were 113 households, out of which 25.7% had children under the age of 18 living with them, 49.6% were married couples living together, 7.1% had a female householder with no husband present, and 39.8% were non-families. 38.9% of all households were made up of individuals, and 22.1% had someone living alone who was 65 years of age or older. The average household size was 2.15 and the average family size was 2.82.

In the city, the population was spread out, with 22.2% under the age of 18, 7.8% from 18 to 24, 23.0% from 25 to 44, 21.8% from 45 to 64, and 25.1% who were 65 years of age or older. The median age was 44 years. For every 100 females, there were 88.4 males. For every 100 females age 18 and over, there were 90.9 males.

The median income for a household in the city was $24,688, and the median income for a family was $30,625. Males had a median income of $38,438 versus $20,000 for females. The per capita income for the city was $14,320. About 5.1% of families and 11.8% of the population were below the poverty line, including 14.1% of those under the age of eighteen and 20.3% of those 65 or over.

== Name ==
Climax, founded in 1896, was named after a chewing tobacco company. The town's name has been a source of humor, and the slogan selected for the centennial was "Climax. More than just a feeling." Less well attested is the assertion that some unnamed local newspaper, reporting the death of a resident of nearby Fertile, Minnesota, ran a report of her death under the headline Fertile Woman dies in Climax.
