= Teien Township, Kittson County, Minnesota =

Township in Minnesota, United States

Teien Township, Minnesota
- Township
- Location of Teien Township, within Kittson County, Minnesota
- Coordinates: 48°34′40″N 97°5′43″W
- Country: United States
- State: Minnesota
- County: Kittson

Area
  - Total: 29.2 sq mi (75.7 km^{2})
  - Land: 28.8 sq mi (74.5 km^{2})
  - Water: 0.50 sq mi (1.3 km^{2})
- Elevation: 797 ft (243 m)

Population (2020)
  - Total: 69
  - Density: 2.4/sq mi (0.93/km^{2})
- Time zone: UTC-6 (Central (CST))
  - Summer (DST): UTC-5 (CDT)
- FIPS code: 27-64354
- GNIS feature ID: 0665771

Teien Township is a township in Kittson County, Minnesota, United States. The population was 69 at the 2020 census.

Minnesota State Highways 11 and 220 are two of the main routes in the township.

The unincorporated community of Robbin is located within Teien Township.

Teien Township was organized in 1882, and named for Andrew C. Teien, an early settler.

== Geography ==
According to the United States Census Bureau, the township has a total area of 29.2 square miles (75.7 km^{2}), of which 28.8 square miles (74.5 km^{2}) is land and 0.5 square mile (1.3 km^{2}) (1.68%) is water.

== Demographics ==
As of the census of 2000, there were 85 people, 38 households, and 28 families residing in the township. The population density was 3.0 people per square mile (1.1/km^{2}). There were 51 housing units at an average density of 1.8/sq mi (0.7/km^{2}). The racial makeup of the township was 100.00% White. Hispanic or Latino of any race were 1.18% of the population.

There were 38 households, out of which 13.2% had children under the age of 18 living with them, 68.4% were married couples living together, 2.6% had a female householder with no husband present, and 23.7% were non-families. 23.7% of all households were made up of individuals, and 13.2% had someone living alone who was 65 years of age or older. The average household size was 2.24 and the average family size was 2.62.

In the township the population was spread out, with 12.9% under the age of 18, 7.1% from 18 to 24, 15.3% from 25 to 44, 30.6% from 45 to 64, and 34.1% who were 65 years of age or older. The median age was 52 years. For every 100 females, there were 107.3 males. For every 100 females age 18 and over, there were 105.6 males.

The median income for a household in the township was $36,250, and the median income for a family was $37,250. Males had a median income of $30,938 versus $21,250 for females. The per capita income for the township was $21,792. There were 5.7% of families and 4.0% of the population living below the poverty line, including no under eighteens and none of those over 64.
