= Winchester Township, Norman County, Minnesota =

Winchester Township, Minnesota
- Township
- Location of Winchester Township, within Norman County, Minnesota
- Coordinates: 47°11′34″N 96°29′23″W
- Country: United States
- State: Minnesota
- County: Norman

Area
  - Total: 35.9 sq mi (93.1 km^{2})
  - Land: 35.9 sq mi (93.1 km^{2})
  - Water: 0 sq mi (0.0 km^{2})
- Elevation: 906 ft (276 m)

Population (2020)
  - Total: 38
  - Density: 1.1/sq mi (0.41/km^{2})
- Time zone: UTC-6 (Central (CST))
  - Summer (DST): UTC-5 (CDT)
- FIPS code: 27-70762
- GNIS feature ID: 0666012

Winchester Township is a township in Norman County, Minnesota, United States. The population was 38 at the 2020 census.

Winchester Township was organized in 1854, and named after Winchester, Iowa.

== Geography ==
According to the United States Census Bureau, the township has a total area of 36.0 square miles (93.1 km^{2}), all land.

== Demographics ==
As of the census of 2000, there were 74 people, 28 households, and 21 families residing in the township. The population density was 2.1 people per square mile (0.8/km^{2}). There were 31 housing units at an average density of 0.9/sq mi (0.3/km^{2}). The racial makeup of the township was 91.89% White, 4.05% African American, and 4.05% from two or more races. Hispanic or Latino of any race were 2.70% of the population.

There were 28 households, out of which 32.1% had children under the age of 18 living with them, 60.7% were married couples living together, 10.7% had a female householder with no husband present, and 25.0% were non-families. 21.4% of all households were made up of individuals, and 10.7% had someone living alone who was 65 years of age or older. The average household size was 2.64 and the average family size was 3.10.

In the township the population was spread out, with 27.0% under the age of 18, 12.2% from 18 to 24, 24.3% from 25 to 44, 27.0% from 45 to 64, and 9.5% who were 65 years of age or older. The median age was 35 years. For every 100 females, there were 131.3 males. For every 100 females age 18 and over, there were 134.8 males.

The median income for a household in the township was $18,750, and the median income for a family was $23,750. Males had a median income of $13,438 versus $16,875 for females. The per capita income for the township was $9,306. There were 25.0% of families and 27.0% of the population living below the poverty line, including no under eighteens and 20.0% of those over 64.
