= Minnesota State Highway 220 =

State highway in Minnesota, United States

Trunk Highway 220
- MN 220 highlighted in red

Route information
- Maintained by MnDOT
- Length: 78.536 mi (126.391 km)
- Existed: July 1, 1949–present

Major junctions
- South end: US 75 at Climax
- US 2 at East Grand Forks; MN 1 from Alvarado to Oslo
- North end: MN 11 / CSAH 7 near Robbin

Location
- Country: United States
- State: Minnesota
- Counties: Polk, Marshall, Kittson

Highway system
- Minnesota Trunk Highway System; Interstate; US; State; Legislative; Scenic
← MN 219	→ MN 222

Minnesota State Highway 220 (MN 220) is a 78.536-mile-long (126.391 km) regional trunk highway in northwest Minnesota, which runs from its intersection with U.S. Highway 75 in Climax and continues north to its northern terminus at its intersection with MN 11 near Drayton, North Dakota. The route runs along and near the Red River.

For part of its route (4 miles), MN 220 runs together with U.S. Highway 2 in the city of East Grand Forks.

== Route description ==
Highway 220 serves as a north–south route in northwest Minnesota between Climax, East Grand Forks, Alvarado, Oslo, and Robbin.

Red River State Recreation Area is located in the city of East Grand Forks near the junction of Highway 220 and U.S. Highway 2.

Highway 220 parallels Interstate 29 throughout its route.

The route is legally defined as Route 220 in the Minnesota Statutes.

== History ==
Highway 220 was authorized on July 1, 1949. It originally intersected U.S. 75 near Eldred and followed present-day County State-Aid Highway 45 to its current routing. It was rerouted south to intersect U.S. 75 at Climax in the late 1950s.

The route was completely paved by 1970.

== Major intersections ==
County	Location	mi	km	Destinations	Notes
Polk	Climax	0.000	0.000	US 75 (Main Avenue N) – Moorhead, Crookston	Southern terminus
Polk	Huntsville Township	23.800	38.302	US 2 east – Crookston	Eastern end of US 2 overlap
Polk	Huntsville Township			US 2 Bus. west – East Grand Forks Business District	
Polk	East Grand Forks	27.241	43.840	US 2 west (Gateway Drive NW) – Grand Forks	Western end of US 2 overlap
Marshall	Alvarado	46.069	74.141	MN 1 east – Warren	Eastern end of MN 1 overlap
Marshall	Oak Park Township	51.070	82.189	MN 1 west – Oslo	Western end of MN 1 overlap
Marshall	Fork Township	66.187	106.518	MN 317 west – Grafton	Eastern terminus of MN 317
Kittson	Teien Township	77.162	124.180	MN 11 – Donaldson, Robbin CSAH 7 north (160th Avenue) – Hallock	Northern terminus; roadway continues as CSAH 7 north
1.000 mi = 1.609 km; 1.000 km = 0.621 mi: Concurrency terminus
