= Spring Creek Township, Norman County, Minnesota =

Spring Creek Township, Minnesota
- Township
- Location of Spring Creek Township, within Norman County, Minnesota
- Coordinates: 47°27′5″N 96°23′15″W
- Country: United States
- State: Minnesota
- County: Norman

Area
  - Total: 36.1 sq mi (93.5 km^{2})
  - Land: 36.0 sq mi (93.2 km^{2})
  - Water: 0.12 sq mi (0.3 km^{2})
- Elevation: 991 ft (302 m)

Population (2020)
  - Total: 67
  - Density: 1.9/sq mi (0.72/km^{2})
- Time zone: UTC-6 (Central (CST))
  - Summer (DST): UTC-5 (CDT)
- FIPS code: 27-61780
- GNIS feature ID: 0665668

Spring Creek Township is a township in Norman County, Minnesota, United States. The population was 67 at the 2020 census.

Spring Creek Township was organized in 1880.

== Geography ==
According to the United States Census Bureau, the township has a total area of 36.1 square miles (93.5 km^{2}), of which 36.0 square miles (93.2 km^{2}) is land and 0.1 square mile (0.3 km^{2}) (0.33%) is water.

== Demographics ==
As of the census of 2000, there were 83 people, 29 households, and 20 families residing in the township. The population density was 2.3 people per square mile (0.9/km^{2}). There were 36 housing units at an average density of 1.0/sq mi (0.4/km^{2}). The racial makeup of the township was 97.59% White, 1.20% Asian, 1.20% from other races. Hispanic or Latino of any race were 2.41% of the population.

There were 29 households, out of which 34.5% had children under the age of 18 living with them, 62.1% were married couples living together, 6.9% had a female householder with no husband present, and 31.0% were non-families. 24.1% of all households were made up of individuals, and 10.3% had someone living alone who was 65 years of age or older. The average household size was 2.86 and the average family size was 3.55.

In the township the population was spread out, with 31.3% under the age of 18, 7.2% from 18 to 24, 19.3% from 25 to 44, 34.9% from 45 to 64, and 7.2% who were 65 years of age or older. The median age was 35 years. For every 100 females, there were 102.4 males. For every 100 females age 18 and over, there were 111.1 males.

The median income for a household in the township was $12,292, and the median income for a family was $23,750. Males had a median income of $23,750 versus $16,250 for females. The per capita income for the township was $9,214. There were 18.2% of families and 37.3% of the population living below the poverty line, including 56.3% of under eighteens and 66.7% of those over 64.
