= Pleasant View Township, Norman County, Minnesota =

Pleasant View Township, Minnesota
- Township
- Location of Pleasant View Township, within Norman County, Minnesota
- Coordinates: 47°21′22″N 96°32′4″W
- Country: United States
- State: Minnesota
- County: Norman

Area
  - Total: 36.3 sq mi (93.9 km^{2})
  - Land: 36.3 sq mi (93.9 km^{2})
  - Water: 0 sq mi (0.0 km^{2})
- Elevation: 902 ft (275 m)

Population (2020)
  - Total: 111
  - Density: 3.06/sq mi (1.18/km^{2})
- Time zone: UTC-6 (Central (CST))
  - Summer (DST): UTC-5 (CDT)
- FIPS code: 27-51658
- GNIS feature ID: 0665325

Pleasant View Township is a township in Norman County, Minnesota, United States. The population was 111 at the 2020 census.

== History ==
Pleasant View Township was organized in 1880.

== Geography ==
According to the United States Census Bureau, the township has a total area of 36.2 square miles (93.9 km^{2}), all land.

== Demographics ==
As of the census of 2000, there were 140 people, 49 households, and 39 families residing in the township. The population density was 3.9 people per square mile (1.5/km^{2}). There were 56 housing units at an average density of 1.5/sq mi (0.6/km^{2}). The racial makeup of the township was 95.00% White, 4.29% Asian, 0.71% from other races. Hispanic or Latino of any race were 0.71% of the population.

There were 49 households, out of which 36.7% had children under the age of 18 living with them, 73.5% were married couples living together, 4.1% had a female householder with no husband present, and 18.4% were non-families. 18.4% of all households were made up of individuals, and 10.2% had someone living alone who was 65 years of age or older. The average household size was 2.86 and the average family size was 3.28.

In the township the population was spread out, with 28.6% under the age of 18, 7.1% from 18 to 24, 20.7% from 25 to 44, 25.7% from 45 to 64, and 17.9% who were 65 years of age or older. The median age was 38 years. For every 100 females there were 125.8 males. For every 100 females age 18 and over, there were 127.3 males.

The median income for a household in the township was $37,500, and the median income for a family was $37,000. Males had a median income of $16,667 versus $19,688 for females. The per capita income for the township was $15,630. There were 4.8% of families and 2.9% of the population living below the poverty line, including no under eighteens and 8.3% of those over 64.
