= Hendrum, Minnesota =

City in Minnesota, United States

Hendrum
- City
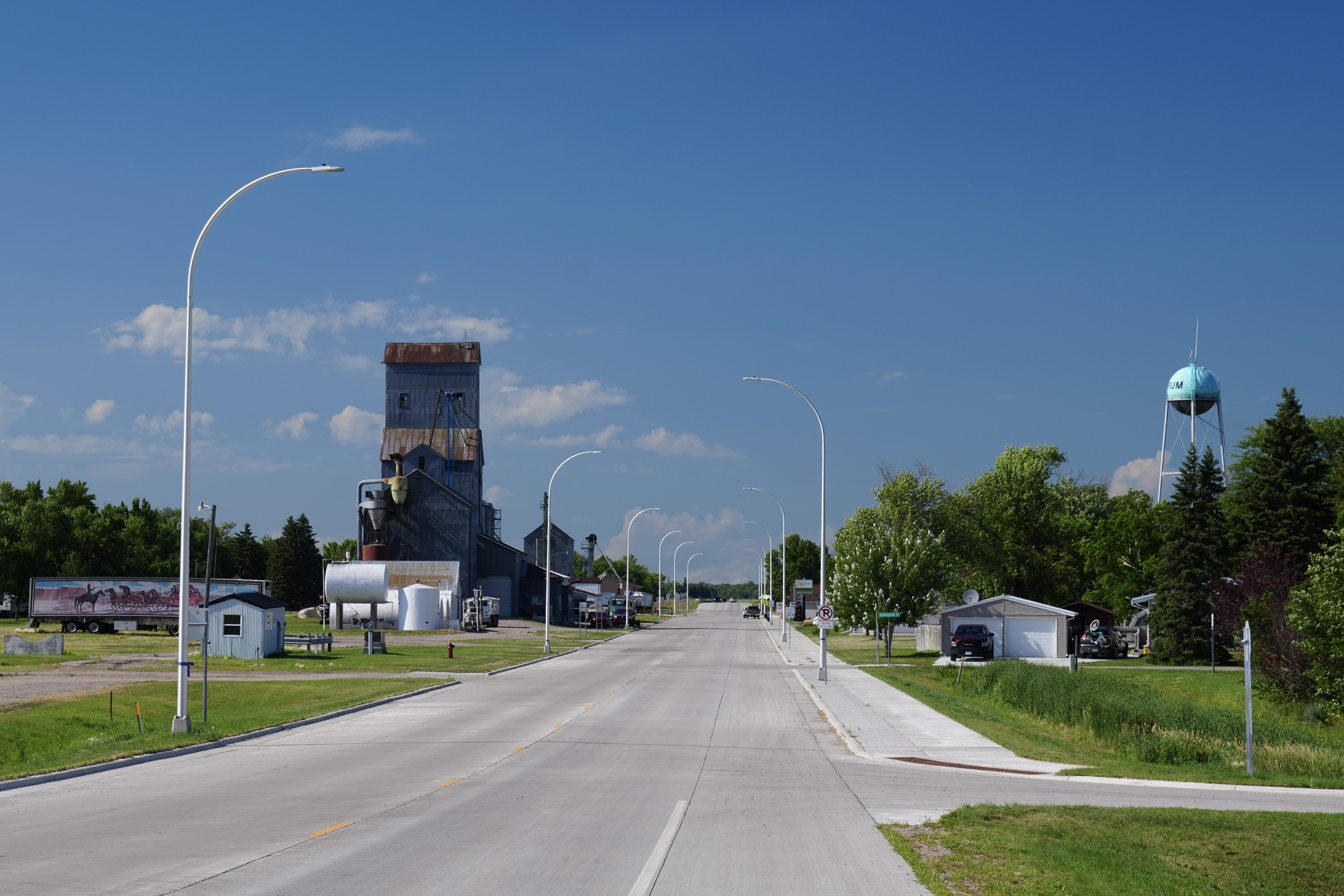
- Hendrum, Minnesota on Highway US-75

- Location of Hendrum, Minnesota
- Coordinates: 47°15′51″N 96°48′38″W
- Country: United States
- State: Minnesota
- County: Norman

Area
  - Total: 0.25 sq mi (0.65 km^{2})
  - Land: 0.25 sq mi (0.65 km^{2})
  - Water: 0 sq mi (0.00 km^{2})
- Elevation: 873 ft (266 m)

Population (2020)
  - Total: 289
  - Estimate (2021): 287
  - Density: 1,143.3/sq mi (441.43/km^{2})
- Time zone: UTC-6 (CST)
  - Summer (DST): UTC-5 (CDT)
- ZIP code: 56550
- Area code: 218
- FIPS code: 27-28484
- GNIS feature ID: 0644871
- Website: cityofhendrum.gov

Hendrum is a city in Norman County, Minnesota, United States, in the Red River Valley between the Red River of the North and the Wild Rice River. The population was 289 as of the 2020 census.

== History ==
Hendrum was laid out in 1881. The original location of Hendrum was in the neighborhood of the Great Northern Railroad bridge, two miles north of the present site of Hendrum. Complications with the railroad company set in, and the village was moved to its present location. The name was taken from the name of the town in Norway from which came Johannes Hagen, namely Hindrumgaard. Incorporation of the village came about in 1891.

== Geography ==
According to the United States Census Bureau, the city has a total area of 0.33 square miles (0.85 km^{2}), all land.

== Demographics ==
Historical population
Census	Pop.	Note	%±
1910	355		—
1920	354		−0.3%
1930	326		−7.9%
1940	341		4.6%
1950	352		3.2%
1960	305		−13.4%
1970	311		2.0%
1980	336		8.0%
1990	309		−8.0%
2000	315		1.9%
2010	307		−2.5%
2020	289		−5.9%
2021 (est.)	287		−0.7%
U.S. Decennial Census; 2020 Census

=== 2010 census ===
As of the census of 2010, there were 307 people, 124 households, and 82 families residing in the city. The population density was 930.3 inhabitants per square mile (359.2/km^{2}). There were 143 housing units at an average density of 433.3 per square mile (167.3/km^{2}). The racial makeup of the city was 94.8% White, 0.7% Native American, and 4.6% from other races. Hispanic or Latino of any race were 8.1% of the population.

There were 124 households, of which 30.6% had children under the age of 18 living with them, 53.2% were married couples living together, 8.1% had a female householder with no husband present, 4.8% had a male householder with no wife present, and 33.9% were non-families. 31.5% of all households were made up of individuals, and 12.1% had someone living alone who was 65 years of age or older. The average household size was 2.48 and the average family size was 3.12.

The median age in the city was 37.3 years. 27.7% of residents were under the age of 18; 7.7% were between the ages of 18 and 24; 23.2% were from 25 to 44; 27.7% were from 45 to 64; and 13.7% were 65 years of age or older. The gender makeup of the city was 49.5% male and 50.5% female.

=== 2000 census ===
As of the census of 2000, there were 315 people, 120 households, and 84 families residing in the city. The population density was 1,112.3 inhabitants per square mile (429.5/km^{2}). There were 139 housing units at an average density of 490.8 per square mile (189.5/km^{2}). The racial makeup of the city was 95.24% White, 1.59% Native American and 2.86% from other races. Hispanic or Latino of any race were 4.44% of the population.

There were 120 households, out of which 37.5% had children under the age of 18 living with them, 57.5% were married couples living together, 7.5% had a female householder with no husband present, and 30.0% were non-families. 27.5% of all households were made up of individuals, and 15.0% had someone living alone who was 65 years of age or older. The average household size was 2.63 and the average family size was 3.24.

The city's age distribution was 31.1% under the age of 18, 7.6% from 18 to 24, 29.2% from 25 to 44, 23.8% from 45 to 64, and 8.3% who were 65 years of age or older. The median age was 34 years. For every 100 females, there were 99.4 males. For every 100 females age 18 and over, there were 99.1 males.

The median income for a household in the city of Hendrum was $35,000, and the median income for a family was $44,167. Males had a median income of $32,000 versus $21,458 for females. The per capita income for the city was $14,530. About 6.3% of families and 9.7% of the population were below the poverty line, including 14.7% of those under age 18 and 7.1% of those age 65 or over.

== Notable people ==
- Roy P. Johnson, journalist
