= Roy P. Johnson =

American journalist

Roy P. Johnson (died 1963) was an American reporter-historian.

== Early life ==
Johnson was born in Hendrum, Minnesota.

== Career ==
=== Railway station agent and telegrapher ===
He began his career in 1916 as a railway station agent. His ability as a telegrapher ultimately led him to employment as an Associated Press telegrapher assigned to The Fargo Forum.

=== The Fargo Forum ===
In 1927, he joined the editorial department of The Forum. He served in the U.S. Navy during World War II, returning to The Forum in 1945 continuing his career as a reporter until his death. He was the chief reporter for The Forum of both the court and city hall in Fargo while at the same time producing a phenomenally interesting rendition of a seemingly bland but unusually rich local history. His contributions were the beginning of a broader literature of the history of this somewhat obscure corner of Northeastern North Dakota and Northwestern Minnesota, and in this regard he was perhaps the most influential and noteworthy figure in the developing historiography of the region.

=== Historical research ===
Mr. Johnson is best known for his work as a reporter-historian for The Forum. Between 1941 and 1963 Roy delighted readers of The Forum with his accounts of regional frontier history. This series has been largely reproduced in a compendium published in 1982 called Roy Johnson's Red River Valley: A Selection of Historical Articles First Printed in the Forum from 1941 to 1962. Although he considered himself an "amateur" historian, much of his oeuvre is unique and irreplaceable. His newspaper columns remain the most detailed and incisive chronicle of the history of the Red River of the North and its environs. He captured moments in frontier history at a time when oral history and personal reminiscence could still fill in the blank spaces left by official histories and biographies, producing what remains one of the primary sources for Red River Valley history.

In addition to his interest in the Red River Valley, Mr. Johnson had a consuming interest in the events surrounding the defeat of General Custer at the Battle of the Little Bighorn. He had been able to even have an interview with the last survivor before he had died. He was a member of a number of historical societies in North Dakota, Minnesota, Montana, and Manitoba. In 1958 he was appointed to the advisory council of the Civil War Centennial Commission, and in 1960 he served as a historical adviser for the Dakota Territorial Centennial Commission, plus two committees for the Minnesota centennial observances. His papers are maintained at the North Dakota State University Institute for Regional Studies, in Fargo, North Dakota.
