= Lockhart Township, Norman County, Minnesota =

Lockhart Township, Minnesota
- Township
- Location of Lockhart Township, within Norman County, Minnesota
- Coordinates: 47°26′54″N 96°31′35″W
- Country: United States
- State: Minnesota
- County: Norman

Area
  - Total: 36.3 sq mi (93.9 km^{2})
  - Land: 36.3 sq mi (93.9 km^{2})
  - Water: 0 sq mi (0.0 km^{2})
- Elevation: 906 ft (276 m)

Population (2020)
  - Total: 48
  - Density: 1.3/sq mi (0.51/km^{2})
- Time zone: UTC-6 (Central (CST))
  - Summer (DST): UTC-5 (CDT)
- ZIP code: 56510
- Area code: 218
- FIPS code: 27-37790
- GNIS feature ID: 0664809

Lockhart Township is a township in Norman County, Minnesota, United States. The population was 48 at the 2020 census.

== History ==
Lockhart Township was organized in 1882, and named after Charles Lockhart, the owner of Lockhart Farm. He was connected with the Standard Oil Company and died in 1908. In 1901, the Lockhart Farm was sold and subdivided into smaller farms and many farmers from Illinois came here to settle. About this time, the village of Lockhart began to take shape. The depot was originally located at Rolette, a small station 1.5 miles north of the present site of Lockhart. Rolette was named after Joseph Rolette who served in the Minnesota Territorial Legislature from 1851-1858. It was an exciting event when the elevator at Rolette was moved to Lockhart. It took two months. They used a cable and winch, used a horse to wind up the cable, moved the building a short distance, then staked it out again and so on. August Maas, a German immigrant opened a general store in Rolette in 1886 where he was also the postmaster. In the fall of 1901 he moved the store south to Lockhart.

== Geography ==
According to the United States Census Bureau, the township has a total area of 36.2 square miles (93.9 km^{2}), all land.

== Demographics ==
As of the census of 2000, there were 63 people, 27 households, and 18 families residing in the township. The population density was 1.7 inhabitants per square mile (0.66/km^{2}). There were 39 housing units at an average density of 1.1 per square mile (0.42/km^{2}). The racial makeup of the township was 100.00% White.

There were 27 households, out of which 25.9% had children under the age of 18 living with them, 59.3% were married couples living together, 3.7% had a female householder with no husband present, and 33.3% were non-families. 33.3% of all households were made up of individuals, and 11.1% had someone living alone who was 65 years of age or older. The average household size was 2.33 and the average family size was 3.00.

In the township the population was spread out, with 20.6% under the age of 18, 6.3% from 18 to 24, 23.8% from 25 to 44, 31.7% from 45 to 64, and 17.5% who were 65 years of age or older. The median age was 44 years. For every 100 females, there were 110.0 males. For every 100 females age 18 and over, there were 150.0 males.

The median income for a household in the township was $36,250, and the median income for a family was $40,625. Males had a median income of $26,250 compared to $18,750 for females. The per capita income for the township was $19,424. There were 22.2% of families and 25.4% of the population living below the poverty line, including 33.3% of under eighteens and none of those over 64.
