= Halstad Township, Norman County, Minnesota =

Halstad Township, Minnesota
- Township
- Location of Halstad Township, within Norman County, Minnesota
- Coordinates: 47°22′19″N 96°46′58″W
- Country: United States
- State: Minnesota
- County: Norman

Area
  - Total: 37.9 sq mi (98.2 km^{2})
  - Land: 37.9 sq mi (98.2 km^{2})
  - Water: 0 sq mi (0.0 km^{2})
- Elevation: 876 ft (267 m)

Population (2020)
  - Total: 104
  - Density: 2.74/sq mi (1.06/km^{2})
- Time zone: UTC-6 (Central (CST))
  - Summer (DST): UTC-5 (CDT)
- ZIP code: 56548
- Area code: 218
- FIPS code: 27-26648
- GNIS feature ID: 0664376

Halstad Township is a township in Norman County, Minnesota. The population was 104 as of the 2020 census.

Halstad Township was organized in 1879, and named for Ole Halstad, a Norwegian settler.

== Geography ==
According to the United States Census Bureau, the township has a total area of 37.9 square miles (98 km^{2}), all land.

== Demographics ==
As of the census of 2000, there were 622 people, 55 households, and 39 families residing in the township. The population density was 3.7 inhabitants per square mile (1.4/km^{2}). There were 69 housing units at an average density of 1.8 per square mile (0.69/km^{2}). The racial makeup of the township was 96.48% White, 0.70% Asian, 2.82% from other races. Hispanic or Latino of any race were 2.11% of the population.

There were 55 households, out of which 38.2% had children under the age of 18 living with them, 56.4% were married couples living together, 9.1% had a female householder with no husband present, and 27.3% were non-families. 27.3% of all households were made up of individuals, and 7.3% had someone living alone who was 65 years of age or older. The average household size was 2.58 and the average family size was 3.13.

In the township the population was spread out, with 31.7% under the age of 18, 4.9% from 18 to 24, 25.4% from 25 to 44, 23.2% from 45 to 64, and 14.8% who were 65 years of age or older. The median age was 38 years. For every 100 females, there were 97.2 males. For every 100 females aged 18 and over, there were 110.9 males.

The median income for a household in the township was $37,083, and the median income for a family was $37,500. Males had a median income of $25,750 versus $25,000 for females. The per capita income for the township was $21,871. There were 5.3% of families and 3.1% of the population living below the poverty line, including no under eighteens and 10.0% of those over 64.
