= Green Meadow Township, Norman County, Minnesota =

Green Meadow Township, Minnesota
- Township
- Location of Green Meadow Township, within Norman County, Minnesota
- Coordinates: 47°22′34″N 96°22′34″W
- Country: United States
- State: Minnesota
- County: Norman

Area
  - Total: 36.6 sq mi (94.8 km^{2})
  - Land: 36.6 sq mi (94.8 km^{2})
  - Water: 0 sq mi (0.0 km^{2})
- Elevation: 955 ft (291 m)

Population (2020)
  - Total: 85
  - Density: 2.3/sq mi (0.90/km^{2})
- Time zone: UTC-6 (Central (CST))
  - Summer (DST): UTC-5 (CDT)
- FIPS code: 27-25766
- GNIS feature ID: 0664344

Green Meadow Township is a township in Norman County, Minnesota, United States. The population was 85 at the 2020 census.

Green Meadow Township was organized in 1880, and named for the prairie landscapes within its borders.

== Geography ==
According to the United States Census Bureau, the township has a total area of 36.6 square miles (95 km^{2}), all land.

== Demographics ==
As of the census of 2000, there were 114 people, 42 households, and 33 families residing in the township. The population density was 3.1 inhabitants per square mile (1.2/km^{2}). There were 49 housing units at an average density of 1.3 per square mile (0.50/km^{2}). The racial makeup of the township was 99.12% White, and 0.88% from two or more races.

There were 42 households, out of which 35.7% had children under the age of 18 living with them, 73.8% were married couples living together, and 21.4% were non-families. 21.4% of all households were made up of individuals, and 9.5% had someone living alone who was 65 years of age or older. The average household size was 2.71 and the average family size was 3.12.

In the township the population was spread out, with 26.3% under the age of 18, 7.0% from 18 to 24, 25.4% from 25 to 44, 23.7% from 45 to 64, and 17.5% who were 65 years of age or older. The median age was 40 years. For every 100 females, there were 111.1 males. For every 100 females age 18 and over, there were 110.0 males.

The median income for a household in the township was $33,750, and the median income for a family was $43,125. Males had a median income of $26,250 versus $20,833 for females. The per capita income for the township was $13,135. There were no families and 5.3% of the population living below the poverty line, including no under eighteens and 10.5% of those over 64.
