= Anthony Township, Norman County, Minnesota =

Anthony Township, Minnesota
- Township
- Location of Anthony Township, within Norman County, Minnesota
- Coordinates: 47°21′53″N 96°39′20″W
- Country: United States
- State: Minnesota
- County: Norman

Area
  - Total: 36.0 sq mi (93.3 km^{2})
  - Land: 36.0 sq mi (93.3 km^{2})
  - Water: 0 sq mi (0.0 km^{2})
- Elevation: 890 ft (270 m)

Population (2020)
  - Total: 65
  - Density: 1.8/sq mi (0.70/km^{2})
- Time zone: UTC-6 (Central (CST))
  - Summer (DST): UTC-5 (CDT)
- FIPS code: 27-01774
- GNIS feature ID: 0663442

Anthony Township is a township in Norman County, Minnesota. As of the 2020 census, the population was 65.

== History ==
Anthony Township was organized in 1879 and named for Anthony Scheie, a pioneer settler.

== Geography ==
According to the United States Census Bureau, the township has a total area of 36.0 square miles (93 km^{2}), all land.

== Demographics ==
As of the census of 2000, there were 85 people, 30 households, and 24 families residing in the township. The population density was 2.4 inhabitants per square mile (0.93/km^{2}). There were 39 housing units at an average density of 1.1 per square mile (0.42/km^{2}). The racial makeup of the township was 97.65% White, 2.35% from other races. Hispanic or Latino of any race were 2.35% of the population.

There were 30 households, out of which 40.0% had children under the age of 18 living with them, 76.7% were married couples living together, 3.3% had a female householder with no husband present, and 20.0% were non-families. 20.0% of all households were made up of individuals, and 10.0% had someone living alone who was 65 years of age or older. The average household size was 2.83 and the average family size was 3.29.

In the township the population was spread out, with 32.9% under the age of 18, 4.7% from 18 to 24, 30.6% from 25 to 44, 17.6% from 45 to 64, and 14.1% who were 65 years of age or older. The median age was 38 years. For every 100 females, there were 93.2 males. For every 100 females age 18 and over, there were 96.6 males.

The median income for a household in the township was $42,292, and the median income for a family was $48,750. Males had a median income of $28,929 versus $17,917 for females. The per capita income for the township was $19,788. None of the population or the families were below the poverty line.

East Marsh Lutheran Church and Augustana Lutheran Church provided the backbone for congregations that were almost all Norwegian.
