= Lake Ida Township, Norman County, Minnesota =

Lake Ida Township, Minnesota
- Township
- Location of Lake Ida Township, within Norman County, Minnesota
- Coordinates: 47°16′28″N 96°22′11″W
- Country: United States
- State: Minnesota
- County: Norman

Area
  - Total: 32.3 sq mi (83.7 km^{2})
  - Land: 32.3 sq mi (83.7 km^{2})
  - Water: 0 sq mi (0.0 km^{2})
- Elevation: 945 ft (288 m)

Population (2020)
  - Total: 137
  - Density: 4.24/sq mi (1.64/km^{2})
- Time zone: UTC-6 (Central (CST))
  - Summer (DST): UTC-5 (CDT)
- FIPS code: 27-34532
- GNIS feature ID: 0664682

Lake Ida Township is a township in Norman County, Minnesota, United States. The population was 137 at the 2020 census.

Lake Ida Township was organized in 1879, and derives its name from Ida Paulson, the daughter of a pioneer settler.

== Geography ==
According to the United States Census Bureau, the township has a total area of 32.3 square miles (84 km^{2}), all land.

== Demographics ==
As of the census of 2000, there were 164 people, 56 households, and 47 families residing in the township. The population density was 5.1 inhabitants per square mile (2.0/km^{2}). There were 62 housing units at an average density of 1.9 per square mile (0.73/km^{2}). The racial makeup of the township was 97.56% White, 1.22% Native American, and 1.22% from two or more races. Hispanic or Latino of any race were 3.66% of the population.

There were 56 households, out of which 39.3% had children under the age of 18 living with them, 73.2% were married couples living together, 10.7% had a female householder with no husband present, and 14.3% were non-families. 12.5% of all households were made up of individuals, and 5.4% had someone living alone who was 65 years of age or older. The average household size was 2.93 and the average family size was 3.19.

In the township the population was spread out, with 28.0% under the age of 18, 11.0% from 18 to 24, 24.4% from 25 to 44, 27.4% from 45 to 64, and 9.1% who were 65 years of age or older. The median age was 39 years. For every 100 females, there were 97.6 males. For every 100 females age 18 and over, there were 90.3 males.

The median income for a household in the township was $46,563, and the median income for a family was $47,188. Males had a median income of $28,750 versus $25,000 for females. The per capita income for the township was $18,469. None of the population or families were below the poverty line.
