= Hendrum Township, Norman County, Minnesota =

Hendrum Township, Minnesota
- Township
- Location of Hendrum Township, within Norman County, Minnesota
- Coordinates: 47°16′17″N 96°45′52″W
- Country: United States
- State: Minnesota
- County: Norman

Area
  - Total: 42.0 sq mi (108.8 km^{2})
  - Land: 41.9 sq mi (108.6 km^{2})
  - Water: 0.077 sq mi (0.2 km^{2})
- Elevation: 873 ft (266 m)

Population (2020)
  - Total: 83
  - Density: 2.0/sq mi (0.76/km^{2})
- Time zone: UTC-6 (Central (CST))
  - Summer (DST): UTC-5 (CDT)
- ZIP code: 56550
- Area code: 218
- FIPS code: 27-28502
- GNIS feature ID: 0664452

Hendrum Township is a township in Norman County, Minnesota, United States. The population was 83 at the 2020 census.

Hendrum Township was organized in 1880, and named after a place in Norway.

== Geography ==
According to the United States Census Bureau, the township has a total area of 42.0 square miles (109 km^{2}), of which 41.9 square miles (109 km^{2}) is land and 0.1 square miles (0.26 km^{2}) (0.19%) is water.

== Demographics ==
As of the census of 2000, there were 118 people, 46 households, and 36 families residing in the township. The population density was 2.8 inhabitants per square mile (1.1/km^{2}). There were 54 housing units at an average density of 1.3 per square mile (0.50/km^{2}). The racial makeup of the township was 96.61% White, 2.54% Native American and 0.85% Asian. Hispanic or Latino of any race were 0.85% of the population.

There were 46 households, out of which 32.6% had children under the age of 18 living with them, 71.7% were married couples living together, 2.2% had a female householder with no husband present, and 19.6% were non-families. 15.2% of all households were made up of individuals, and 10.9% had someone living alone who was 65 years of age or older. The average household size was 2.57 and the average family size was 2.86.

In the township the population was spread out, with 22.9% under the age of 18, 5.9% from 18 to 24, 18.6% from 25 to 44, 30.5% from 45 to 64, and 22.0% who were 65 years of age or older. The median age was 46 years. For every 100 females, there were 110.7 males. For every 100 females age 18 and over, there were 127.5 males.

The median income for a household in the township was $36,071, and the median income for a family was $36,607. Males had a median income of $26,875 versus $22,813 for females. The per capita income for the township was $17,238. None of the population or the families were below the poverty line.
