= Good Hope Township, Norman County, Minnesota =

Good Hope Township, Minnesota
- Township
- Location of Good Hope Township, within Norman County, Minnesota
- Coordinates: 47°27′44″N 96°39′21″W
- Country: United States
- State: Minnesota
- County: Norman

Area
  - Total: 36.1 sq mi (93.5 km^{2})
  - Land: 36.1 sq mi (93.5 km^{2})
  - Water: 0 sq mi (0.0 km^{2})
- Elevation: 883 ft (269 m)

Population (2020)
  - Total: 45
  - Density: 1.2/sq mi (0.48/km^{2})
- Time zone: UTC-6 (Central (CST))
  - Summer (DST): UTC-5 (CDT)
- FIPS code: 27-24380
- GNIS feature ID: 0664290

Good Hope Township is a township in Norman County, Minnesota, United States. The population was 45 at the 2020 census.

Good Hope Township was organized in 1892.

== Geography ==
According to the United States Census Bureau, the township has a total area of 36.1 square miles (93 km^{2}), all land.

== Demographics ==
As of the census of 2000, there were 44 people, 18 households, and 10 families residing in the township. The population density was 1.2 inhabitants per square mile (0.46/km^{2}). There were 28 housing units at an average density of 0.8 per square mile (0.31/km^{2}). The racial makeup of the township was 100.00% White.

There were 18 households, out of which 16.7% had children under the age of 18 living with them, 61.1% were married couples living together, and 38.9% were non-families. 27.8% of all households were made up of individuals, and 5.6% had someone living alone who was 65 years of age or older. The average household size was 2.44 and the average family size was 3.09.

In the township the population was spread out, with 25.0% under the age of 18, 9.1% from 18 to 24, 20.5% from 25 to 44, 27.3% from 45 to 64, and 18.2% who were 65 years of age or older. The median age was 38 years. For every 100 females, there were 158.8 males. For every 100 females age 18 and over, there were 135.7 males.

The median income for a household in the township was $24,375, and the median income for a family was $28,750. Males had a median income of $20,625 versus $41,250 for females. The per capita income for the township was $12,100. There were no families and 5.0% of the population living below the poverty line, including no under eighteens and none of those over 64.
