= Halstad, Minnesota =

City in Minnesota, United States

Halstad
- City
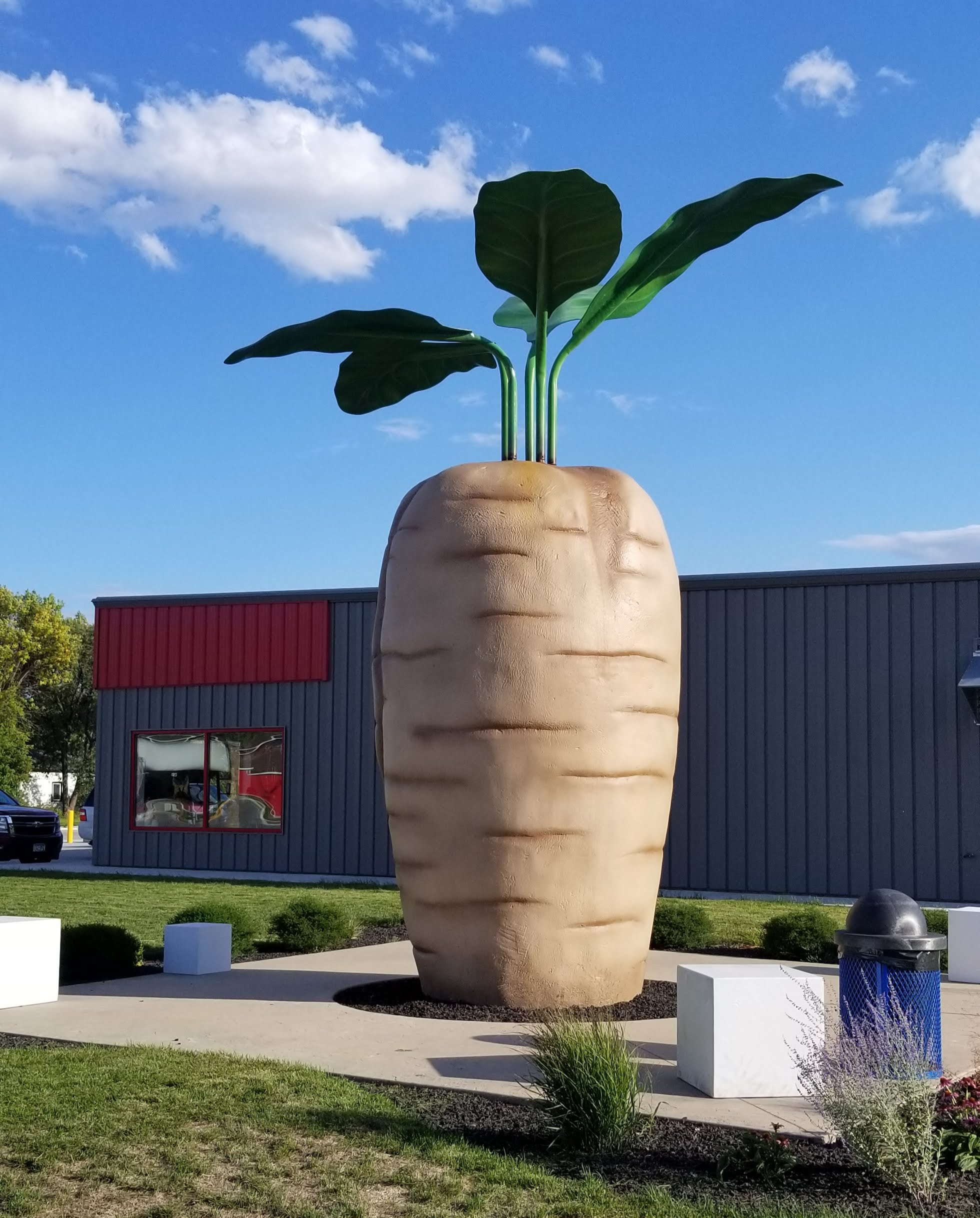
- Sugar beet sculpture in Halstad
- Motto: "The Way Rural America Is Supposed to Be"
- Location of Halstad, Minnesota
- Coordinates: 47°21′5″N 96°49′32″W
- Country: United States
- State: Minnesota
- County: Norman

Government
  - Mayor: Darin Johnson

Area
  - Total: 0.36 sq mi (0.94 km^{2})
  - Land: 0.36 sq mi (0.94 km^{2})
  - Water: 0 sq mi (0.00 km^{2})
- Elevation: 873 ft (266 m)

Population (2020)
  - Total: 564
  - Estimate (2021): 579
  - Density: 1,554.9/sq mi (600.35/km^{2})
- Time zone: UTC-6 (CST)
  - Summer (DST): UTC-5 (CDT)
- ZIP code: 56548
- Area code: 218
- FIPS code: 27-26630
- GNIS feature ID: 0644588
- Website: halstad.com

Halstad is a city in Norman County, Minnesota, United States. The population was 564 at the time of the 2020 census. The city is known for its production of sugar beets, and has a statue of a sugar beet, known as the world's largest sugar beet, to commemorate this status.

== History ==
The town of Halstad came into being on September 23, 1883, when the railroad was extended to it. It was platted for C.G. Comstock and wife and A.A. White and wife on that date. It appeared to the majority most fitting to use the same name for the town as had been adopted for its post office - hence the name Halstad was adopted. This was moved into town in 1884 from Ole Halstad's rural home. Less than a year after Halstad became a town, the construction of a school within the village was begun.

The city's unofficial motto is "You Can't Beet Halstad," based on its prominent crop, the sugar beet. In 2020, the town founded Sugar Beet Park, featuring a sculpture of the "World's Largest Sugar Beet" created by artist Josh Porter and formed around the base of a concrete mixer truck drum.

== Geography ==
According to the United States Census Bureau, the city has a total area of 0.31 square miles (0.80 km^{2}), all land.

The Highway 200 bridge that crosses the Red River was replaced in the late 1990s, after constant flooding found it under water and impassable. Directly across the Red River on the north side of Highway 200, a small pond called Grandin Lake has provided the only close example of a freshwater ecosystem that is not a river. The table top topography of this region is impressive. There are regions of the Red River that have a one-inch change in elevation per mile.

== Demographics ==
Historical population
Census	Pop.	Note	%±
1900	442		—
1910	494		11.8%
1920	528		6.9%
1930	535		1.3%
1940	570		6.5%
1950	635		11.4%
1960	639		0.6%
1970	598		−6.4%
1980	690		15.4%
1990	611		−11.4%
2000	622		1.8%
2010	597		−4.0%
2020	564		−5.5%
2021 (est.)	579		2.7%
U.S. Decennial Census; 2020 Census

=== 2010 census ===
As of the census of 2010, there were 597 people, 251 households, and 139 families living in the city. The population density was 1,925.8 inhabitants per square mile (743.6/km^{2}). There were 306 housing units at an average density of 987.1 per square mile (381.1/km^{2}). The racial makeup of the city was 94.0% White, 0.2% African American, 2.8% Native American, 0.8% from other races, and 2.2% from two or more races. Hispanic or Latino of any race were 4.7% of the population.

There were 251 households, of which 27.1% had children under the age of 18 living with them, 43.0% were married couples living together, 10.0% had a female householder with no husband present, 2.4% had a male householder with no wife present, and 44.6% were non-families. 39.0% of all households were made up of individuals, and 19.1% had someone living alone who was 65 years of age or older. The average household size was 2.23 and the average family size was 3.01.

The median age in the city was 46.6 years. 24.3% of residents were under the age of 18; 5.9% were between the ages of 18 and 24; 18% were from 25 to 44; 27% were from 45 to 64; and 24.8% were 65 years of age or older. The gender makeup of the city was 49.2% male and 50.8% female.

=== 2000 census ===
As of the census of 2000, there were 622 people, 249 households, and 154 families living in the city. The population density was 2,131.3 inhabitants per square mile (822.9/km^{2}). There were 295 housing units at an average density of 1,010.8 per square mile (390.3/km^{2}). The racial makeup of the city was 94.37% White, 0.16% African American, 1.45% Native American, 2.41% from other races, and 1.61% from two or more races. Hispanic or Latino of any race were 10.13% of the population.

There were 249 households, out of which 26.9% had children under the age of 18 living with them, 53.4% were married couples living together, 6.4% had a female householder with no husband present, and 37.8% were non-families. 36.5% of all households were made up of individuals, and 21.3% had someone living alone who was 65 years of age or older. The average household size was 2.26 and the average family size was 2.95.

In the city, the population was spread out, with 23.2% under the age of 18, 4.5% from 18 to 24, 19.0% from 25 to 44, 23.3% from 45 to 64, and 30.1% who were 65 years of age or older. The median age was 47 years. For every 100 females, there were 81.9 males. For every 100 females age 18 and over, there were 79.7 males.

The median income for a household in the city was $31,875, and the median income for a family was $43,750. Males had a median income of $38,594 versus $21,354 for females. The per capita income for the city was $15,918. About 8.9% of families and 11.1% of the population were below the poverty line, including 11.0% of those under age 18 and 9.6% of those age 65 or over.

== Infrastructure ==
=== Transportation ===
U.S. Route 75 and Minnesota State Highway 200 are two of the main routes in the community.

== Notable people ==
- Andrew Aanenson (1869–1951), politician and farmer
- Tony Brottem (1891–1929), baseball player
- Donna Jean Christianson (1931–2015), politician and farmer
- Marvin E. Christianson Sr. (1928–1969), politician and farmer
- Skitch Henderson (1918–2005), pianist, conductor, and composer
