= Good Hope Township, Itasca County, Minnesota =

Good Hope Township, Minnesota
- Township
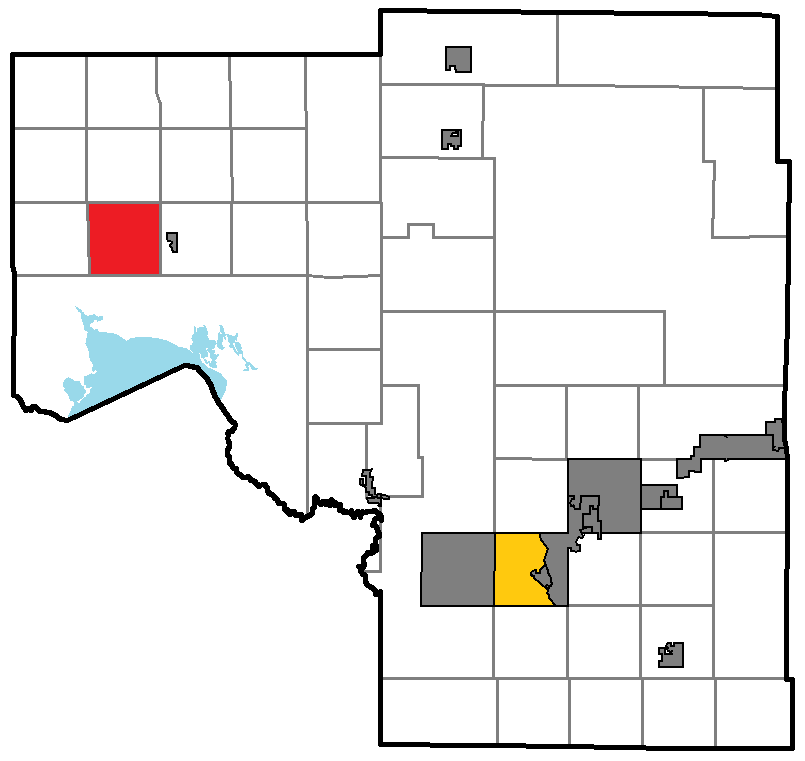
- Location of Good Hope Township, within Itasca County, Minnesota
- Coordinates: 47°38′0″N 94°12′33″W
- Country: United States
- State: Minnesota
- County: Itasca

Area
  - Total: 34.7 sq mi (89.8 km^{2})
  - Land: 30.8 sq mi (79.8 km^{2})
  - Water: 3.9 sq mi (10.0 km^{2})
- Elevation: 1,322 ft (403 m)

Population (2020)
  - Total: 137
  - Density: 4.45/sq mi (1.72/km^{2})
- Time zone: UTC-6 (Central (CST))
  - Summer (DST): UTC-5 (CDT)
- ZIP code: 56681
- Area code: 218
- FIPS code: 27-24362
- GNIS feature ID: 0664289

Good Hope Township is a township in Itasca County, Minnesota, United States. The population was 137 at the 2020 census.

== Geography ==
According to the United States Census Bureau, the township has a total area of 34.7 square miles (90 km^{2}), of which 30.8 square miles (80 km^{2}) is land and 3.8 square miles (9.8 km^{2}), or 11.10%, is water.

== Demographics ==
As of the census of 2000, there were 79 people, 35 households, and 22 families living in the township. The population density was 2.6 inhabitants per square mile (1.0/km^{2}). There were 106 housing units at an average density of 3.4 per square mile (1.3/km^{2}). The racial makeup of the township was 81.01% White, 12.66% Native American, and 6.33% from two or more races.

There were 35 households, out of which 20.0% had children under the age of 18 living with them, 60.0% were married couples living together, and 37.1% were non-families. 31.4% of all households were made up of individuals, and 17.1% had someone living alone who was 65 years of age or older. The average household size was 2.26 and the average family size was 2.82.

In the township the population was spread out, with 19.0% under the age of 18, 6.3% from 18 to 24, 22.8% from 25 to 44, 31.6% from 45 to 64, and 20.3% who were 65 years of age or older. The median age was 48 years. For every 100 females, there were 119.4 males. For every 100 females age 18 and over, there were 106.5 males.

The median income for a household in the township was $25,000, and the median income for a family was $39,167. Males had a median income of $32,083 versus $8,750 for females. The per capita income for the township was $12,623. There were 16.7% of families and 15.8% of the population living below the poverty line, including no under eighteens and 35.3% of those over 64.
