= Norman County, Minnesota =

County in Minnesota, United States

- County
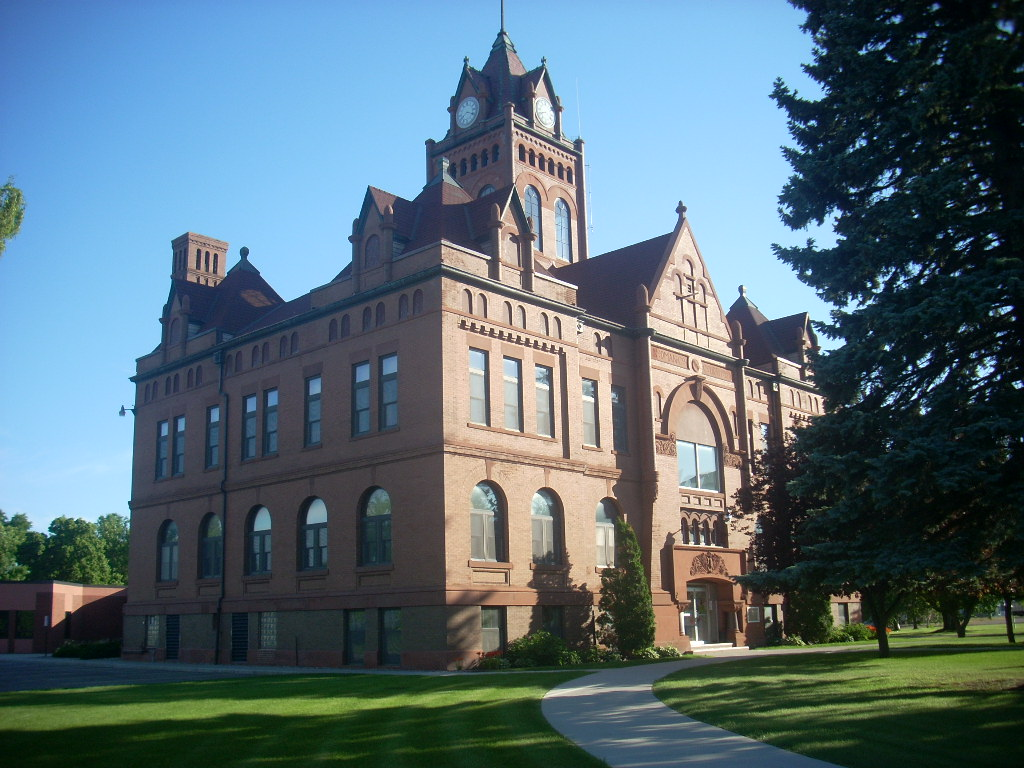
- The Norman County Courthouse in Ada

- Location within the U.S. state of Minnesota
- Coordinates: 47.329453°N 96.463776°W
- Country: United States
- State: Minnesota
- Founded: February 17, 1881 (established); November 8, 1881 (created/organized)
- Named for: Norwegian settlers
- Seat: Ada
- Largest city: Ada

Area
  - Total: 876.730 sq mi (2,270.72 km^{2})
  - Land: 872.789 sq mi (2,260.51 km^{2})
  - Water: 3.941 sq mi (10.21 km^{2}) 0.45%

Population (2020)
  - Total: 6,441
  - Estimate (2025): 6,336 ▼
  - Density: 7.2/sq mi (2.8/km^{2})
- Time zone: UTC−6 (Central)
  - Summer (DST): UTC−5 (CDT)
- Area code: 218
- Congressional district: 7th
- Website: www.normanmn.gov

Norman County is a county in the northwestern part of the U.S. state of Minnesota. As of the 2020 census, the population was 6,441, and was estimated to be 6,336 in 2025. The county seat and the largest city is Ada. The county is in Minnesota's Red River Valley region.

== History ==
Norwegians started settling in Norman County in the early 1870s and up until December 27, 1906 that also included what is now Mahnomen County (Ojibwe for "wild rice"). The county was created by the Minnesota legislature on March 17, 1881, with Ada (which had been founded in 1874) as county seat. Even though Twin Valley was much closer to the geographic center of the county Ada was chosen as the county seat, sparking a 6 year legal battle.

It was named in recognition of the many settlers who came from Scandinavian countries, especially Norway. Another source posits that it was named for Norman Kittson, an early historical figure of the region.

In March 1915, a law was signed to give Minnesota counties the right to choose whether to allow alcohol production. At this point, all cities in Norman County had voted to ban alcohol already.

== Geography ==
Norman County lies on Minnesota's western border, abutting North Dakota across the Red River, which flows north along (and defines) the county's west line. The Wild Rice River flows west through the lower part of the county, discharging into the Red slightly north of the county's southwest corner. The Marsh River rises in central Norman County and flows northwest into the Red near the county's northwest corner. The county terrain consists of low rolling hills, carved by drainages and lightly dotted with lakes and swampy areas. The terrain is devoted to agriculture. The terrain slopes to the north and west with its highest point near its southeast corner, at 1,224 ft (373 m) ASL.

According to the United States Census Bureau, the county has a total area of 876.730 square miles (2,270.72 km^{2}), of which 872.789 square miles (2,260.51 km^{2}) is land and 3.941 square miles (10.21 km^{2}) (0.45%) is water. It is the 26th largest county in Minnesota by total area.

Flom Township contains a prominent, irregular hill of morainic drift known as Frenchman's Bluff. It rises 150 ft (46 m) above the shoreline of the former Lake Agassis, three miles (4.8 km) to the northwest.

Soils of Norman County

=== Major highways ===
- U.S. Highway 75
- Minnesota State Highway 9
- Minnesota State Highway 32
- Minnesota State Highway 113
- Minnesota State Highway 200

=== Adjacent counties ===
- Polk County - north
- Mahnomen County - east
- Becker County - southeast
- Clay County - south
- Cass County, North Dakota - southwest
- Traill County, North Dakota - west

=== Protected areas ===
- Agassiz Dunes Scientific and Natural Area (part)
- Agassiz No. 1 State Wildlife Management Area
- Agassiz No. 2 State Wildlife Management Area
- Dalby State Wildlife Management Area
- Faith State Wildlife Management Area
- Home Lake State Wildlife Management Area
- Moccasin State Wildlife Management Area
- Neal State Wildlife Management Area
- Prairie Smoke Dunes Scientific and Natural Area
- Sandpiper Scientific and Natural Area
- Santee Prairie Scientific and Natural Area
- Syre State Wildlife Management Area
- Twin Valley Prairie Scientific and Natural Area
- Twin Valley State Wildlife Management Area
- Vangsness State Wildlife Management Area

=== Lakes ===
- Home Lake
- Lockhart Swamp

== Demographics ==
Historical population
Census	Pop.	Note	%±
1890	10,618		—
1900	15,045		41.7%
1910	13,446		−10.6%
1920	14,880		10.7%
1930	14,061		−5.5%
1940	14,746		4.9%
1950	12,909		−12.5%
1960	11,253		−12.8%
1970	10,008		−11.1%
1980	9,379		−6.3%
1990	7,975		−15.0%
2000	7,442		−6.7%
2010	6,852		−7.9%
2020	6,441		−6.0%
2025 (est.)	6,336	▼	−1.6%
U.S. Decennial Census; 1790–1960 1900–1990; 1990–2000 2010–2020

As of the fourth quarter of 2024, the median home value in Norman County was $145,108.

As of the 2023 American Community Survey, there are 2,676 estimated households in Norman County with an average of 2.34 persons per household. The county has a median household income of $69,833. Approximately 12.3% of the county's population lives at or below the poverty line. Norman County has an estimated 63.4% employment rate, with 20.9% of the population holding a bachelor's degree or higher and 93.4% holding a high school diploma.

The top five reported ancestries (people were allowed to report up to two ancestries, thus the figures will generally add to more than 100%) were English (95.9%), Spanish (2.2%), Indo-European (0.7%), Asian and Pacific Islander (0.9%), and Other (0.4%).

=== Racial and ethnic composition ===
Norman County, Minnesota – racial and ethnic composition
Note: the US Census treats Hispanic/Latino as an ethnic category. This table excludes Latinos from the racial categories and assigns them to a separate category. Hispanics/Latinos may be of any race.

Race / ethnicity (NH = non-Hispanic)	Pop. 1980	Pop. 1990	Pop. 2000	Pop. 2010	Pop. 2020
White alone (NH)	9,267 (98.81%)	7,816 (98.01%)	6,957 (93.48%)	6,293 (91.84%)	5,702 (88.53%)
Black or African American alone (NH)	0 (0.00%)	4 (0.05%)	7 (0.09%)	11 (0.16%)	17 (0.26%)
Native American or Alaska Native alone (NH)	47 (0.50%)	67 (0.84%)	121 (1.63%)	100 (1.46%)	115 (1.79%)
Asian alone (NH)	32 (0.34%)	16 (0.20%)	23 (0.31%)	25 (0.36%)	18 (0.28%)
Pacific Islander alone (NH)	—	—	0 (0.00%)	0 (0.00%)	0 (0.00%)
Other race alone (NH)	0 (0.00%)	0 (0.00%	12 (0.16%)	4 (0.06%)	32 (0.50%)
Mixed race or multiracial (NH)	—	—	95 (1.28%)	143 (2.09%)	269 (4.18%)
Hispanic or Latino (any race)	33 (0.35%)	72 (0.90%)	227 (3.05%)	276 (4.03%)	288 (4.47%)
Total	9,379 (100.00%)	7,975 (100.00%)	7,442 (100.00%)	6,852 (100.00%)	6,441 (100.00%)

=== 2024 estimate ===
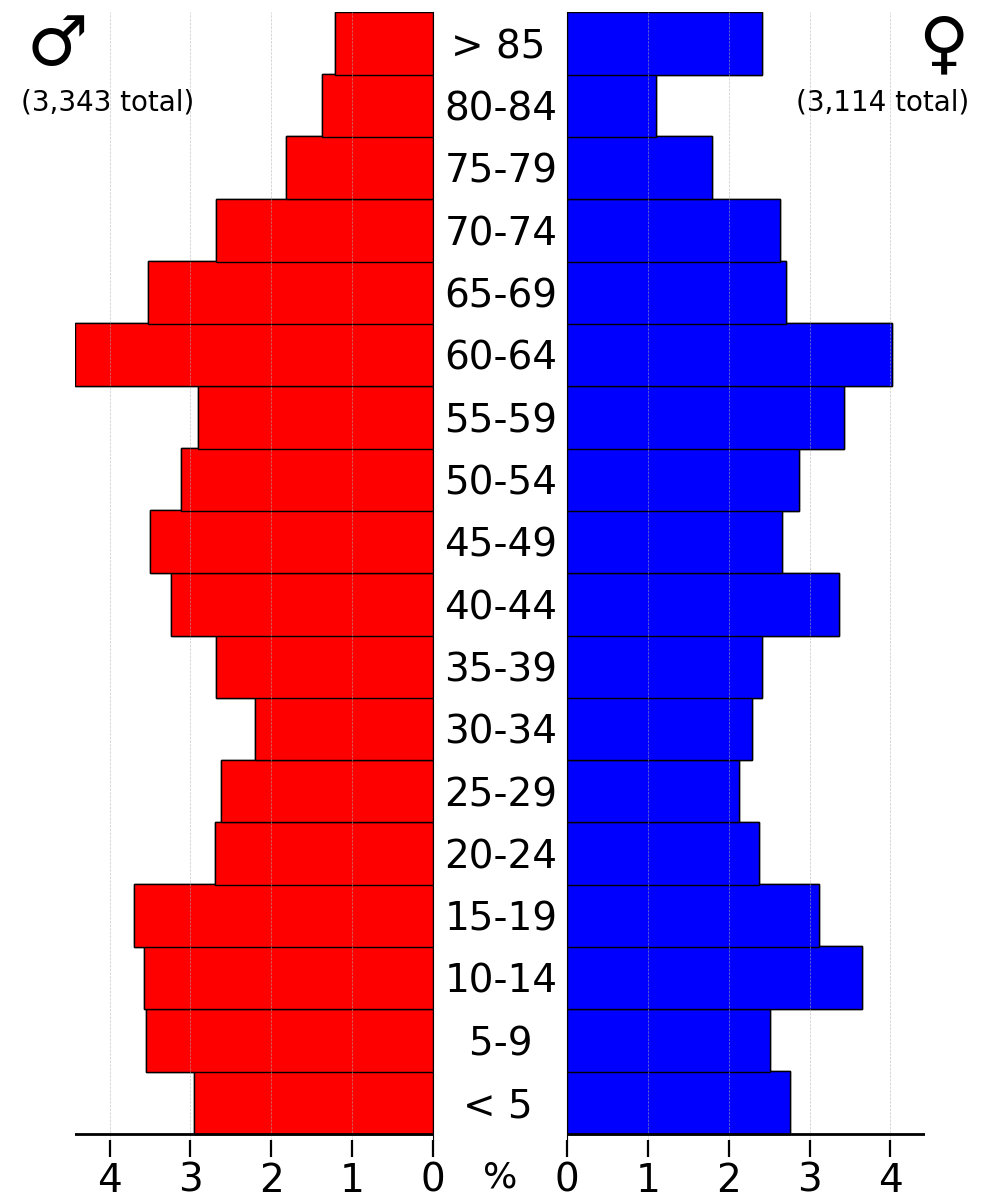
2022 US Census population pyramid for Norman County, from ACS 5-year estimates

As of the 2024 estimate, there were 6,284 people and 2,676 households residing in the county. There were 3,249 housing units at an average density of 3.72 per square mile (1.4/km^{2}). The racial makeup of the county was 92.6% White (87.7% NH White), 0.9% African American, 2.5% Native American, 0.7% Asian, 0.0% Pacific Islander, _% from some other races and 3.2% from two or more races. Hispanic or Latino people of any race were 5.9% of the population.

=== 2020 census ===
As of the 2020 census, the county had a population of 6,441. The median age was 44.9 years. 22.8% of residents were under the age of 18 and 22.3% of residents were 65 years of age or older. For every 100 females there were 106.0 males, and for every 100 females age 18 and over there were 103.6 males age 18 and over.

The racial makeup of the county was 90.3% White, 0.3% Black or African American, 1.8% American Indian and Alaska Native, 0.3% Asian, <0.1% Native Hawaiian and Pacific Islander, 1.5% from some other race, and 5.8% from two or more races. Hispanic or Latino residents of any race comprised 4.5% of the population.

<0.1% of residents lived in urban areas, while 100.0% lived in rural areas.

There were 2,733 households in the county, of which 25.8% had children under the age of 18 living in them. Of all households, 49.4% were married-couple households, 21.6% were households with a male householder and no spouse or partner present, and 21.8% were households with a female householder and no spouse or partner present. About 31.1% of all households were made up of individuals and 15.2% had someone living alone who was 65 years of age or older.

There were 3,230 housing units, of which 15.4% were vacant. Among occupied housing units, 78.9% were owner-occupied and 21.1% were renter-occupied. The homeowner vacancy rate was 2.4% and the rental vacancy rate was 17.6%.

=== 2010 census ===
As of the 2010 census, there were 6,852 people, 2,863 households, and _ families residing in the county. The population density was 7.9 inhabitants per square mile (3.1/km^{2}). There were 3,421 housing units at an average density of 3.92 per square mile (1.5/km^{2}). The racial makeup of the county was 94.21% White, 0.19% African American, 1.59% Native American, 0.36% Asian, 0.00% Pacific Islander, 1.34% from some other races and 2.31% from two or more races. Hispanic or Latino people of any race were 4.03% of the population.

=== 2000 census ===
As of the 2000 census, there were 7,442 people, 3,010 households, and 2,007 families in the county. The population density was 8.52 inhabitants per square mile (3.3/km^{2}). There were 3,455 housing units at an average density of 3.96 per square mile (1.5/km^{2}). The racial makeup of the county was 95.30% White, 0.11% African American, 1.73% Native American, 0.31% Asian, 0.00% Pacific Islander, 1.13% from some other races and 1.42% from two or more races. Hispanic or Latino people of any race were 3.05% of the population.

In terms of ancestry, 57.5% were of Norwegian and 21.7% German.

There were 3,010 households, out of which 30.10% had children under the age of 18 living with them, 57.80% were married couples living together, 5.90% had a female householder with no husband present, and 33.30% were non-families. 31.30% of all households were made up of individuals, and 17.00% had someone living alone who was 65 years of age or older. The average household size was 2.41 and the average family size was 3.04.

The county population contained 25.70% under the age of 18, 6.20% from 18 to 24, 24.10% from 25 to 44, 23.00% from 45 to 64, and 20.90% of over age 64. The median age was 41 years. For every 100 females there were 98.60 males. For every 100 females age 18 and over, there were 96.80 males.

The median income for a household in the county was $32,535, and the median income for a family was $41,280. Males had a median income of $28,674 versus $20,619 for females. The per capita income for the county was $15,895. About 7.10% of families and 10.30% of the population were below the poverty line, including 10.70% of those under age 18 and 14.30% of those age 65 or over.

== Communities ==
=== Cities ===
- Ada (county seat)
- Borup
- Gary
- Halstad
- Hendrum
- Perley
- Shelly
- Twin Valley

=== Unincorporated communities ===
- Betcher
- Faith
- Flom
- Hadler
- Lockhart
- Ranum
- Syre
- Waukon

Townships of Norman County

=== Townships ===
- Anthony Township
- Bear Park Township
- Flom Township
- Fossum Township
- Good Hope Township
- Green Meadow Township
- Halstad Township
- Hegne Township
- Hendrum Township
- Home Lake Township
- Lake Ida Township
- Lee Township
- Lockhart Township
- Mary Township
- McDonaldsville Township
- Pleasant View Township
- Rockwell Township
- Shelly Township
- Spring Creek Township
- Strand Township
- Sundal Township
- Waukon Township
- Wild Rice Township
- Winchester Township

== Government and politics ==
From 1932 to 2012, Norman County voted Democratic, typically by large margins, in all but three elections: two were the nationwide Republican landslide victories of Dwight D. Eisenhower in 1952 and Richard Nixon in 1972, and the third was in 2000, when strong third party showings in the state helped swing the county to George W. Bush. The 2016 election, however, saw the county swing significantly to the right, as Donald Trump won the county by over 13%. He increased his margin of victory in 2020 to nearly 16%, and turned in the best performance for a Republican in Norman County since Herbert Hoover in 1928. Trump increased his margin of victory to over 22% in the county in 2024, breaking this record yet again.

United States presidential election results for Norman County, Minnesota
Year	Republican		Democratic		Third party(ies)	
Year	No.	%	No.	%	No.	%
1892	724	38.97%	294	15.82%	840	45.21%
1896	1,382	49.61%	1,304	46.81%	100	3.59%
1900	1,492	53.57%	964	34.61%	329	11.81%
1904	1,782	78.02%	161	7.05%	341	14.93%
1908	1,276	55.26%	661	28.63%	372	16.11%
1912	329	14.74%	510	22.85%	1,393	62.41%
1916	1,046	42.11%	1,076	43.32%	362	14.57%
1920	3,451	74.17%	481	10.34%	721	15.50%
1924	1,997	45.77%	171	3.92%	2,195	50.31%
1928	3,308	67.39%	1,401	28.54%	200	4.07%
1932	1,313	25.09%	3,601	68.80%	320	6.11%
1936	1,570	28.54%	3,778	68.67%	154	2.80%
1940	2,161	36.53%	3,716	62.81%	39	0.66%
1944	1,884	39.51%	2,846	59.69%	38	0.80%
1948	1,695	32.87%	3,245	62.92%	217	4.21%
1952	3,069	55.07%	2,465	44.23%	39	0.70%
1956	2,338	46.01%	2,740	53.93%	3	0.06%
1960	2,642	47.30%	2,932	52.49%	12	0.21%
1964	1,662	31.35%	3,631	68.50%	8	0.15%
1968	1,981	39.53%	2,828	56.42%	203	4.05%
1972	2,536	50.51%	2,444	48.68%	41	0.82%
1976	1,983	39.57%	2,946	58.78%	83	1.66%
1980	2,192	44.92%	2,253	46.17%	435	8.91%
1984	2,152	49.17%	2,202	50.31%	23	0.53%
1988	1,789	45.22%	2,149	54.32%	18	0.46%
1992	1,541	37.39%	1,784	43.29%	796	19.32%
1996	1,392	37.40%	1,875	50.38%	455	12.22%
2000	1,808	49.66%	1,575	43.26%	258	7.09%
2004	1,794	47.09%	1,954	51.29%	62	1.63%
2008	1,204	35.06%	2,129	62.00%	101	2.94%
2012	1,384	43.16%	1,730	53.94%	93	2.90%
2016	1,699	52.10%	1,264	38.76%	298	9.14%
2020	1,953	56.76%	1,404	40.80%	84	2.44%
2024	1,963	59.59%	1,233	37.43%	98	2.98%

County Board of Commissioners
Position	Name	District (City)
Commissioner	Timothy Oistad	District 1 (Gary)
Commissioner	Jesse Lee	District 2 (Ada)
Commissioner	Steve Jacobson	District 3 (Hendrum)
Commissioner and Chairperson	Lee Ann Hall	District 4 (Ada)
Commissioner	Darren Andersen	District 5 (Twin Valley)

State Legislature (2023-2026)
Position	Name	Affiliation	District
Senate	Mark T. Johnson	Republican	District 01, R
House of Representatives	Steve Gander	Republican	District 01, B

U.S Congress (2023-2024)
Position	Name	Affiliation	District
House of Representatives	Michelle Fischbach	Republican	7th
Senate	Amy Klobuchar	Democrat	N/A
Senate	Tina Smith	Democrat	N/A

== See also ==
- National Register of Historic Places listings in Norman County, Minnesota
