= Minnesota State Highway 92 =

State highway in Minnesota, United States

Trunk Highway 92
- MN 92 highlighted in red

Route information
- Maintained by MnDOT
- Length: 71.526 mi (115.110 km)
- Existed: 1933–present

Major junctions
- West end: MN 32 at Lake Pleasant Township near Red Lake Falls
- US 59 at Brooks; US 2 at Bagley
- East end: MN 200 at Zerkel

Location
- Country: United States
- State: Minnesota
- Counties: Red Lake, Polk, Clearwater

Highway system
- Minnesota Trunk Highway System; Interstate; US; State; Legislative; Scenic
| ← MN 91 | → MN 93 |

Minnesota State Highway 92 (MN 92) is a 71.526-mile-long (115.110 km) highway in northwest Minnesota, which runs from its intersection with State Highway 32 in Lake Pleasant Township near Red Lake Falls and continues east and then south to its eastern terminus at its intersection with State Highway 200 at Zerkel, south of the city of Bagley.

== Route description ==
Highway 92 serves as an east–west and north–south route in northwest Minnesota between Red Lake Falls, Brooks, Clearbrook, Bagley, and Zerkel.

The highway is officially marked as an east–west route by its highway shields from beginning to end.

The section of Highway 92 at Zerkel passes through the White Earth State Forest.

The route is legally defined as Constitutional Route 65 and Legislative Route 169 in the Minnesota Statutes. It is not marked with these numbers.

== History ==
Highway 92 was marked in 1934. The section between U.S. Highway 2 at Bagley and State Highway 32 was previously marked 65.

From 1934 to 1950, Highway 92 extended on the southeast end to U.S. 71 at Lake Itasca. From 1950 to 1963, Highway 92 extended even further east to Highway 371 at Walker, over what was originally State Highway 85. This Highway 92 extension later became State Highway 31 and is now part of present day State Highway 200.

The route was paved northwest of U.S. 2 by 1940. The remaining part of the route was paved by 1953.

== Major intersections ==
| County | Location | mi | km | Destinations | Notes |
|---|---|---|---|---|---|
| Red Lake | Lake Pleasant Township | 0.000 | 0.000 | MN 32 – US 2, Red Lake Falls | |
| Red Lake | Brooks | 12.992 | 20.909 | US 59 – Thief River Falls, Mahnomen | |
| Red Lake | Lambert Township | 19.588 | 31.524 | MN 222 north – Oklee | Southern terminus of MN 222 |
| Polk | No major junctions | | | | |
| Clearwater | Holst Township | 47.792 | 76.914 | MN 223 east (Leonard Road) – Leonard | Western terminus of MN 223 |
| Clearwater | Bagley | 56.737 | 91.309 | US 2 (Central Avenue) – Bemidji, Crookston | |
| Clearwater | Zerkel | 71.637 | 115.289 | MN 200 – Itasca State Park, Mahnomen | |
1.000 mi = 1.609 km; 1.000 km = 0.621 mi
