= Mallard, Minnesota =

Ghost town in Minnesota, United States

Coordinates: 47°18′40″N 95°16′01″W

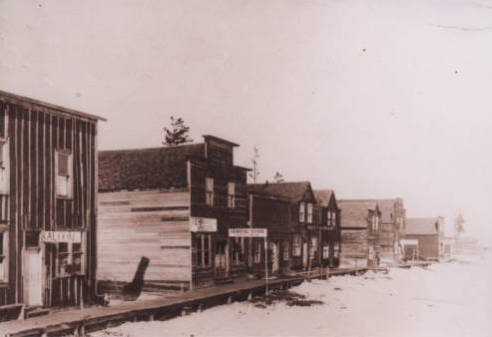
View of Main Street ca. 1909

Mallard is an abandoned townsite in sections 5 and 8 of Itasca Township in Clearwater County, Minnesota, United States. The nearest community is Alida, Minnesota, to the north.

== History ==
The village of Mallard took its name from nearby Mallard Lake and was incorporated on December 30, 1902. Mallard had a post office from 1902 until 1924.

Mallard’s growth was due mainly to the lumbering industry and servicing the many lumber camps in the area. The Red River Logging Company built the Walker Akeley rail spur which included Mallard in 1901. The town contained a post office, bank, druggist, dentist, butcher shop, merchandise stores, restaurant, barber, two hotels, livery stables, and several saloons. In 1907 the town hosted a newspaper named "Mallard Call." After logging ended around 1911 the railroad tracks were pulled up and Mallard began its decline.

Historical population
Census	Pop.	Note	%±
1910	78		—
U.S. Decennial Census
