= Mallard Lake =

Mallard Lake may refer to:

- Mallard Lake (Florida)
- Mallard Lake (Aitkin County, Minnesota)
- Mallard Lake (Clearwater County, Minnesota)
- Mallard Lake (Nebraska), a private lake also known as Mallard Landing
- Mallard Lake Landfill, a solid waste landfill in DuPage County, Illinois
