= Peterson Lake =

Peterson Lake may refer to:

- Peterson Lake (Clearwater County, Minnesota)
- Peterson Lake (Meeker County, Minnesota)
- Peterson Lake, Wabasha County, Minnesota
