= Minnesota State Highway 200 =

State highway in Minnesota, United States

Trunk Highway 200
- MN 200 highlighted in red

Route information
- Maintained by MnDOT
- Length: 201.203 mi (323.805 km)
- Existed: 1969–present

Major junctions
- West end: ND 200 at the Red River in Halstad
- US 75 at Halstad; MN 9 at Ada; US 59 at Mahnomen; US 71 at Kabekona; MN 64 near Laporte; MN 34 / MN 371 at Walker; MN 6 at Remer; US 169 at Hill City; MN 65 at Jacobson
- East end: US 2 in Northeast Aitkin

Location
- Country: United States
- State: Minnesota
- Counties: Norman, Mahnomen, Clearwater, Hubbard, Cass, Aitkin

Highway system
- Minnesota Trunk Highway System; Interstate; US; State; Legislative; Scenic
← MN 197	→ MN 210

Minnesota State Highway 200 (MN 200) is a 201.203-mile-long (323.805 km) highway in northwest and northeast Minnesota, which runs from North Dakota Highway 200 at the North Dakota state line near Halstad, and continues east to its eastern terminus at its intersection with U.S. Highway 2 in Northeast Aitkin County, nine miles (14 km) west of Floodwood.

At the western terminus, upon crossing the Red River, the roadway continues westward as state highways numbered 200 all the way to Idaho, a total distance of about 1,356 miles (2,182 km).

The route runs across Minnesota from west to east, connecting Ada, Mahnomen, Walker, and Floodwood.

== Route description ==
Highway 200 serves as an east–west route in northwest and northeast Minnesota between Halstad, Ada, Mahnomen, Walker, Remer, Hill City, and Floodwood. Highway 200 parallels U.S. Highway 2 throughout its route

For part of its route (8-miles), Highway 200 is concurrent with Highway 371 through the city of Walker.

Highway 200 also runs together with U.S. Highway 71 for 13 miles (21 km) in Hubbard County between the town of Kabekona and Itasca State Park.

Highway 200 passes through the following forests:

- Savanna State Forest in northern Aitkin County
- Hill River State Forest in northern Aitkin County
- Chippewa National Forest in Cass County
- Paul Bunyan State Forest in Hubbard County
- White Earth State Forest in Clearwater and Mahnomen counties

Highway 200 crosses the Mississippi River twice: once at Jacobson in northeast Aitkin County, and once near Itasca State Park in southeast Clearwater County. Itasca State Park is located on Highways 200 and 71 at the headwaters of the Mississippi River. The north park entrance is located on Highways 92 / 200 between Park Rapids and Bagley.

Highway 200 is also known as Minnesota Avenue in Walker and Main Street in Remer.

== History ==
Highway 200 was designated and signed c. 1969 as part of a link of state routes numbered 200 stretching from Minnesota to Idaho.

The route in Minnesota was previously numbered:

- State Highway 116 (from the North Dakota state line to U.S. 75.)
- State Highway 31 (from U.S. 75, later the North Dakota state line to State Highway 92; later extended to Highway 371 near Walker.)
- State Highway 92 (from the intersection of present-day Highways 92 and 200 to U.S. 71; then later extended to Highway 371 near Walker.)
- State Highway 85 (from U.S. 71 to Highway 371 near Walker.)
- State Highway 34 (from Highway 371 at Walker to U.S. 2, west of Floodwood.)

The route was mostly gravel in 1940, mostly paved by 1953, and completely paved by 1960.

== Major intersections ==
County	Location	mi	km	Destinations	Notes
Red River of the North		0.000	0.000	ND 200 west – Hillsboro	Continuation into North Dakota
Red River of the North		0.000	0.000	Minnesota–North Dakota line	
Norman	Halstad	0.910	1.465	US 75 north – Crookston	Northern end of US 75 concurrency
Norman	Hendrum Township	4.910	7.902	US 75 south – Moorhead	Southern end of US 75 concurrency
Norman	Ada	18.841	30.322	MN 9 – US 10, Crookston	
Norman	Wild Rice Township	29.858	48.052	MN 32 south – Twin Valley	Southern end of MN 32 concurrency
Norman	Wild Rice Township	31.885	51.314	MN 32 north / CSAH 23 – Gary, Fertile	Northern end of MN 32 concurrency
Mahnomen	Marsh Creek–Pembina township line	46.674	75.115	US 59 – Detroit Lakes, Thief River Falls	
Clearwater	Zerkel	74.368	119.684	MN 92 north / CSAH 37 – Bagley	Southern terminus of MN 92
Clearwater	Itasca Township	84.197	135.502	CSAH 2 / CR 102 / Great River Road (National Route) – Itasca State Park, La Salle Lake State Recreation Area	
Hubbard	Lake Alice Township	91.359	147.028	US 71 south / Lake Country Scenic Byway – Park Rapids	Western end of US 71 concurrency
Hubbard	Kabekona	105.034	169.036	US 71 north – Bemidji	Eastern end of US 71 concurrency
Hubbard	Hendrickson Township	109.660	176.481	MN 64 south – Akeley	
Cass	Shingobee Township	119.594	192.468	MN 371 north – Cass Lake	Northern end of MN 371 concurrency
Cass	Walker	123.674	199.034	MN 34 west / Lake Country Scenic Byway – Akeley, Park Rapids	
Cass	Ah-gwah-ching	126.439	203.484	CSAH 37 (Ah-gwah-ching Road west)	Former MN 290
Cass	Shingobee Township	128.419	206.670	MN 371 south – Pine River, Brainerd	Southern end of MN 371 concurrency
Cass	Kego Township	144.030	231.794	MN 84 south / CSAH 8 – Longville, Federal Dam	
Cass	Remer Township	158.137	254.497	MN 6 south – Crosby	Western end of MN 6 concurrency
Cass	Remer	158.908	255.738	MN 6 north – Deer River	Eastern end of MN 6 concurrency
Aitkin	Hill Lake Township	175.181	281.926	US 169 – Aitkin, Grand Rapids	
Aitkin	Mississippi River	191.381– 191.419	307.998– 308.059	Jacobson Bridge	
Aitkin	Jacobson	191.552	308.273	MN 65 south – McGregor	Southern end of MN 65 concurrency
Aitkin	Ball Bluff Township	191.949	308.912	MN 65 north / CR 70 – Range Cities	Northern end of MN 65 concurrency
Aitkin	Northeast Aitkin	201.318	323.990	US 2 – Duluth, Grand Rapids	
1.000 mi = 1.609 km; 1.000 km = 0.621 mi: Concurrency terminus
