= Minnesota State Highway 223 =

State highway in Minnesota, United States

Trunk Highway 223
- Leonard Road
- MN 223 highlighted in red

Route information
- Maintained by MnDOT
- Length: 7.643 mi (12.300 km)
- Existed: July 1, 1949–present

Major junctions
- West end: MN 92 / CSAH 18 in Holst Township
- East end: CSAH 10 in Leonard

Location
- Country: United States
- State: Minnesota
- Counties: Clearwater

Highway system
- Minnesota Trunk Highway System; Interstate; US; State; Legislative; Scenic
← MN 222	→ MN 225

Minnesota State Highway 223 (MN 223) is a 7.643-mile-long (12.300 km) highway in northwest Minnesota, which runs from its intersection with State Highway 92 in Holst Township of Clearwater County and continues east to its eastern terminus at its intersection with Clearwater County State-Aid Highway 10 in Leonard. It is also signed as Leonard Road.

MN 223 passes through Holst Township, Dudley Township, and Leonard.

== Route description ==
Highway 223 serves as an east–west connector route in northwest Minnesota. It connects State Highway 92 with the town of Leonard.

The route is legally defined as Route 223 in the Minnesota Statutes.

== History ==
Highway 223 was authorized on July 1, 1949.

The route was paved in 1960.

== Major intersections ==
The entire route is in Clearwater County.

Location	mi	km	Destinations	Notes
Holst Township	0.000	0.000	MN 92 – Bagley, Clearbrook CSAH 18 west	Western terminus
Holst Township	1.980	3.187	CSAH 33 south	
Holst Township	3.239	5.213	CR 78 north	
Holst Township	3.989	6.420	CSAH 47 south	
Dudley Township	6.960	11.201	CSAH 2 south	
Leonard	7.520	12.102	CSAH 23 east (2nd Avenue)	
Leonard	7.591	12.217	CSAH 14 north (1st Avenue)	
Leonard	7.644	12.302	CSAH 10 west	Eastern terminus
1.000 mi = 1.609 km; 1.000 km = 0.621 mi
