= Minnesota State Highway 222 =

State highway in Minnesota, United States

Trunk Highway 222
- MN 222 highlighted in red

Route information
- Maintained by MnDOT
- Length: 1.474 mi (2.372 km)
- Existed: July 1, 1949–by 2023

Major junctions
- South end: MN 92 in Lambert Township
- North end: CSAH 5 / CSAH 6 in Oklee

Location
- Country: United States
- State: Minnesota
- Counties: Red Lake

Highway system
- Minnesota Trunk Highway System; Interstate; US; State; Legislative; Scenic
← MN 220	→ MN 223

Minnesota State Highway 222 (MN 222) was a short 1.474-mile-long (2.372 km) highway in northwest Minnesota, which ran from its intersection with State Highway 92 in Lambert Township of Red Lake County and continued north to its northern terminus at its intersection with Red Lake County State-Aid Highway 5 in Oklee. The route is 1.5 miles (2.4 km) in length. It was turned over to county control and is now part of Red Lake County State-Aid Highway 5.

== Route description ==
Highway 222 served as a short north–south connector route in northwest Minnesota. It connected State Highway 92 with the town of Oklee.

The route was legally defined as Route 222 in the Minnesota Statutes.

== History ==
Highway 222 was authorized on July 1, 1949.

The route was paved at the time it was marked.

The 2019 Minnesota Legislature authorized removal of the highway, pending a turnback agreement with Red Lake County.

== Major intersections ==
The entire route is in Red Lake County.

Location	mi	km	Destinations	Notes
Lambert Township	0.000	0.000	MN 92 – Brooks, Trail, Bagley	Southern terminus; roadway continues south as MN 92
Oklee	1.008	1.622	CR 131	
Oklee	1.403	2.258	CSAH 22 (2nd Avenue)	
Oklee	1.474	2.372	CSAH 5 north	Northern terminus; roadway continues north as CSAH 5
1.000 mi = 1.609 km; 1.000 km = 0.621 mi
