= Kirk Lake =

Kirk Lake may refer to:

- Kirk Lake (Minnesota), a lake in Clearwater County.
- Kirk Lake (New York), a controlled lake in the Town of Carmel in Putnam County.
