= Kabekona, Minnesota =

Unincorporated community in Minnesota, United States

Kabekona
- Unincorporated community
- Location within Minnesota Location within the United States
- Coordinates: 47°14′05″N 94°52′36″W
- Country: United States
- State: Minnesota
- County: Hubbard
- Township: Hendrickson
- Elevation: 1,371 ft (418 m)
- Time zone: UTC-6 (Central (CST))
  - Summer (DST): UTC-5 (CDT)
- ZIP code: 56458 and 56461
- Area code: 218
- GNIS feature ID: 656840

Kabekona is an unincorporated community in Hendrickson Township, Hubbard County, Minnesota, United States. The community is also known as Kabekona Corner.

The community is located at the junction of U.S. Highway 71 and State Highway 200 (MN 200).

Kabekona is located west of Laporte, east of Lake George, northwest of Walker, and south of Bemidji.

The Paul Bunyan State Forest is nearby.
