= Zerkel, Minnesota =

Unincorporated community in Minnesota, United States

Zerkel
- Unincorporated community
- Location within Minnesota Location within the United States
- Coordinates: 47°18′39″N 95°22′54″W
- Country: United States
- State: Minnesota
- County: Clearwater County
- Township: Rice Township
- Elevation: 1,562 ft (476 m)
- Time zone: UTC-6 (Central (CST))
  - Summer (DST): UTC-5 (CDT)
- ZIP code: 56621
- Area code: 218
- GNIS feature ID: 654436

Zerkel is an unincorporated community in Rice Township, Clearwater County, Minnesota, United States. In the past it has also been referred to as "Pine Center."

It lies south of the city of Bagley and west of Itasca State Park and Lake Itasca.

Clearwater County Road 37 and State Highways 92 (MN 92) and 200 (MN 200) are the main routes in the community.

Zerkel is located within the White Earth State Forest.
