= Ebro (disambiguation) =

Ebro is a river in Spain.

Ebro may also refer to:

- Ebro, Florida, United States, a town
- Ebro, Minnesota, United States, an unincorporated community
- Ebro trucks, a Spanish truck brand
- Ebro (Chery), a Spanish car brand
- Ebro Foods, a Spanish food processing company
- Ebro Darden, a disc jockey on New York's WQHT (Hot 97) radio station
- CD Ebro, a Spanish football club in Zaragoza
- RMS Ebro, a 1914 ocean liner
- Ebro Treaty, 226 BC, defining a boundary between Carthage and Rome

== See also ==
- Battle of the Ebro in the Spanish Civil War
