= Itasca Township =

Itasca Township may refer to the following townships in the United States:

- Itasca Township, Clearwater County, Minnesota
- Itasca Township, Sherman County, Kansas
