= Copley Township =

Copley Township may refer to the following townships in the United States:

- Copley Township, Knox County, Illinois
- Copley Township, Clearwater County, Minnesota
- Copley Township, Ohio
