= Minerva Township =

Minerva Township may refer to:

- Minerva Township, Marshall County, Iowa
- Minerva Township, Clearwater County, Minnesota
