= Leon Township, Minnesota =

Leon Township is the name of some places in the U.S. state of Minnesota:

- Leon Township, Clearwater County, Minnesota
- Leon Township, Goodhue County, Minnesota
