= Bear Creek Township, Clearwater County, Minnesota =

Township in Minnesota, United States

Bear Creek Township
- Township
- Location of Bear Creek Township, within Clearwater County, Minnesota
- Coordinates: 47°21′43″N 95°13′55″W
- Country: United States
- State: Minnesota
- County: Clearwater

Area
  - Total: 32.0 sq mi (82.9 km^{2})
  - Land: 30.3 sq mi (78.5 km^{2})
  - Water: 1.7 sq mi (4.4 km^{2})
- Elevation: 1,490 ft (454 m)

Population (2020)
  - Total: 112
  - Density: 3.70/sq mi (1.43/km^{2})
- Time zone: UTC-6 (Central (CST))
  - Summer (DST): UTC-5 (CDT)
- ZIP code: 56676
- Area code: 218
- FIPS code: 27-04186
- GNIS feature ID: 0663530

Bear Creek Township is a township in Clearwater County, Minnesota, United States. The population was 112 at the 2020 census. This township took its name from Bear Creek.

== Geography ==
According to the United States Census Bureau, the township has a total area of 32.0 square miles (83 km^{2}), of which 30.3 square miles (78 km^{2}) is land and 1.7 square miles (4.4 km^{2}) (5.34%) is water.

== Demographics ==
As of the census of 2000, there were 107 people, 44 households, and 31 families residing in the township. The population density was 3.5 inhabitants per square mile (1.4/km^{2}). There were 86 housing units at an average density of 2.8 per square mile (1.1/km^{2}). The racial makeup of the township was 94.39% White, 1.87% Asian, 1.87% from other races, and 1.87% from two or more races. Hispanic or Latino of any race were 1.87% of the population.

There were 44 households, out of which 29.5% had children under the age of 18 living with them, 63.6% were married couples living together, 4.5% had a female householder with no husband present, and 29.5% were non-families. 29.5% of all households were made up of individuals, and 11.4% had someone living alone who was 65 years of age or older. The average household size was 2.43 and the average family size was 2.97.

In the township the population was spread out, with 27.1% under the age of 18, 3.7% from 18 to 24, 21.5% from 25 to 44, 36.4% from 45 to 64, and 11.2% who were 65 years of age or older. The median age was 42 years. For every 100 females, there were 84.5 males. For every 100 females age 18 and over, there were 110.8 males.

The median income for a household in the township was $47,500, and the median income for a family was $58,750. Males had a median income of $40,417 versus $23,750 for females. The per capita income for the township was $17,842. There were no families and 3.5% of the population living below the poverty line, including no under eighteens and 37.5% of those over 64.
