= Moose Creek Township, Clearwater County, Minnesota =

Township in Minnesota, United States

Moose Creek Township
- Township
- Location of Moose Creek Township, within Clearwater County, Minnesota
- Coordinates: 47°28′27″N 95°14′13″W
- Country: United States
- State: Minnesota
- County: Clearwater

Area
  - Total: 32.2 sq mi (83.4 km^{2})
  - Land: 31.7 sq mi (82.1 km^{2})
  - Water: 0.50 sq mi (1.3 km^{2})
- Elevation: 1,470 ft (448 m)

Population (2020)
  - Total: 256
  - Density: 8.08/sq mi (3.12/km^{2})
- Time zone: UTC-6 (Central (CST))
  - Summer (DST): UTC-5 (CDT)
- ZIP code: 56676
- Area code: 218
- FIPS code: 27-43918
- GNIS feature ID: 0665022

Moose Creek Township is a township in Clearwater County, Minnesota, United States. The population was 256 at the 2020 census. This township took its name from Moose Creek.

== Geography ==
According to the United States Census Bureau, the township has a total area of 32.2 square miles (83.4 km^{2}), of which 31.7 square miles (82.1 km^{2}) is land and 0.5 square mile (1.3 km^{2}) (1.55%) is water.

== Demographics ==
As of the census of 2000, there were 227 people, 96 households, and 64 families residing in the township. The population density was 7.2 people per square mile (2.8/km^{2}). There were 110 housing units at an average density of 3.5/sq mi (1.3/km^{2}). The racial makeup of the township was 98.24% White and 1.76% Native American. Hispanic or Latino of any race were 0.44% of the population.

There were 96 households, out of which 27.1% had children under the age of 18 living with them, 61.5% were married couples living together, 2.1% had a female householder with no husband present, and 32.3% were non-families. 28.1% of all households were made up of individuals, and 14.6% had someone living alone who was 65 years of age or older. The average household size was 2.36 and the average family size was 2.88.

In the township the population was spread out, with 22.0% under the age of 18, 5.7% from 18 to 24, 22.9% from 25 to 44, 34.4% from 45 to 64, and 15.0% who were 65 years of age or older. The median age was 45 years. For every 100 females, there were 102.7 males. For every 100 females age 18 and over, there were 110.7 males.

The median income for a household in the township was $42,500, and the median income for a family was $50,000. Males had a median income of $35,729 versus $28,750 for females. The per capita income for the township was $18,725. About 4.5% of families and 8.1% of the population were below the poverty line, including none of those under the age of eighteen and 14.3% of those 65 or over.
