= Remer Township, Cass County, Minnesota =

Remer Township, Minnesota
- Township
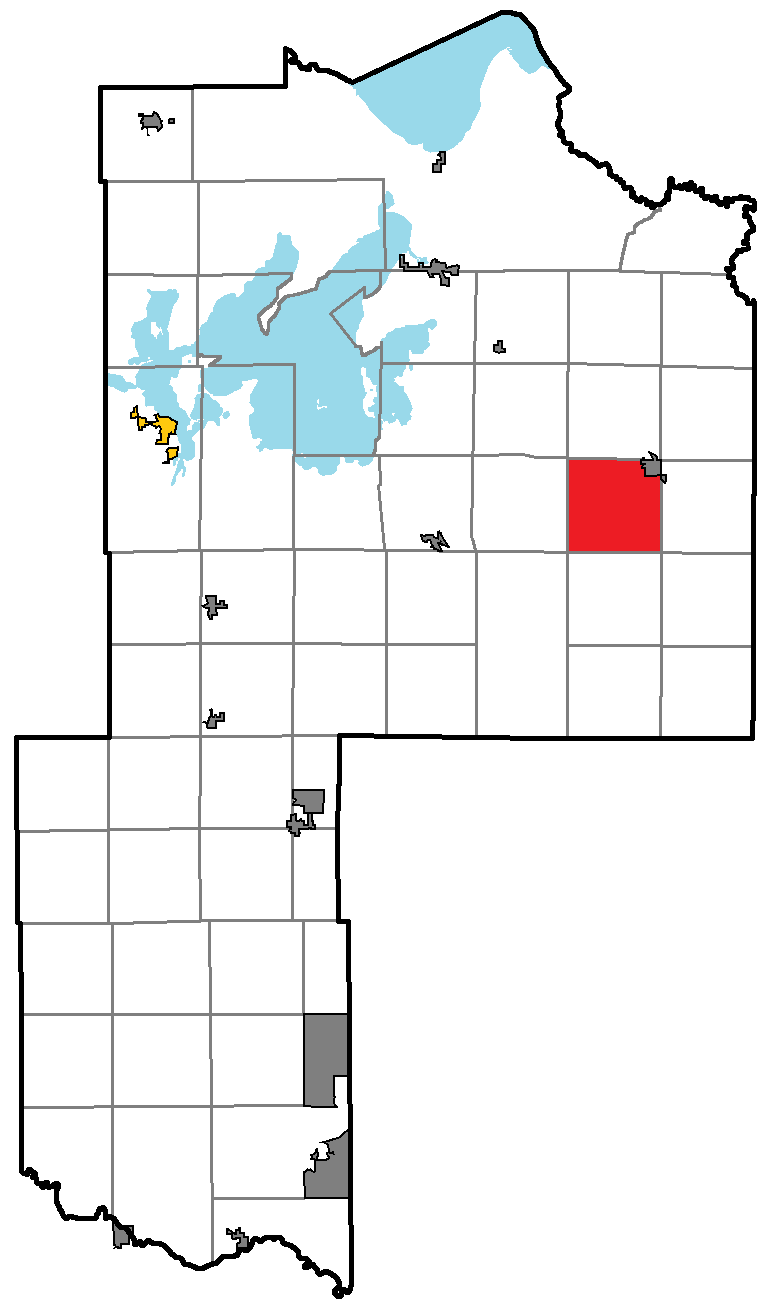
- Location of Remer Township, within Cass County, Minnesota
- Coordinates: 47°2′34″N 93°58′38″W
- Country: United States
- State: Minnesota
- County: Cass

Area
  - Total: 35.1 sq mi (90.9 km^{2})
  - Land: 29.2 sq mi (75.5 km^{2})
  - Water: 5.9 sq mi (15.4 km^{2})
- Elevation: 1,368 ft (417 m)

Population (2020)
  - Total: 193
  - Density: 6.62/sq mi (2.56/km^{2})
- Time zone: UTC-6 (Central (CST))
  - Summer (DST): UTC-5 (CDT)
- ZIP code: 56672
- Area code: 218
- FIPS code: 27-53800
- GNIS feature ID: 0665397

Remer Township is a township in Cass County, Minnesota, United States. The population was 193 as of the 2020 census. Remer Township was named for two brothers, E. N. and William P. Remer.

== Geography ==
According to the United States Census Bureau, the township has a total area of 35.1 square miles (90.9 km^{2}), of which 29.1 square miles (75.5 km^{2}) is land and 5.9 square miles (15.4 km^{2}) (16.90%) is water.

The southwest quarter of the city of Remer is located within Remer Township geographically but is a separate entity.

=== Major highways ===
- Minnesota State Highway 6
- Minnesota State Highway 200

=== Lakes ===
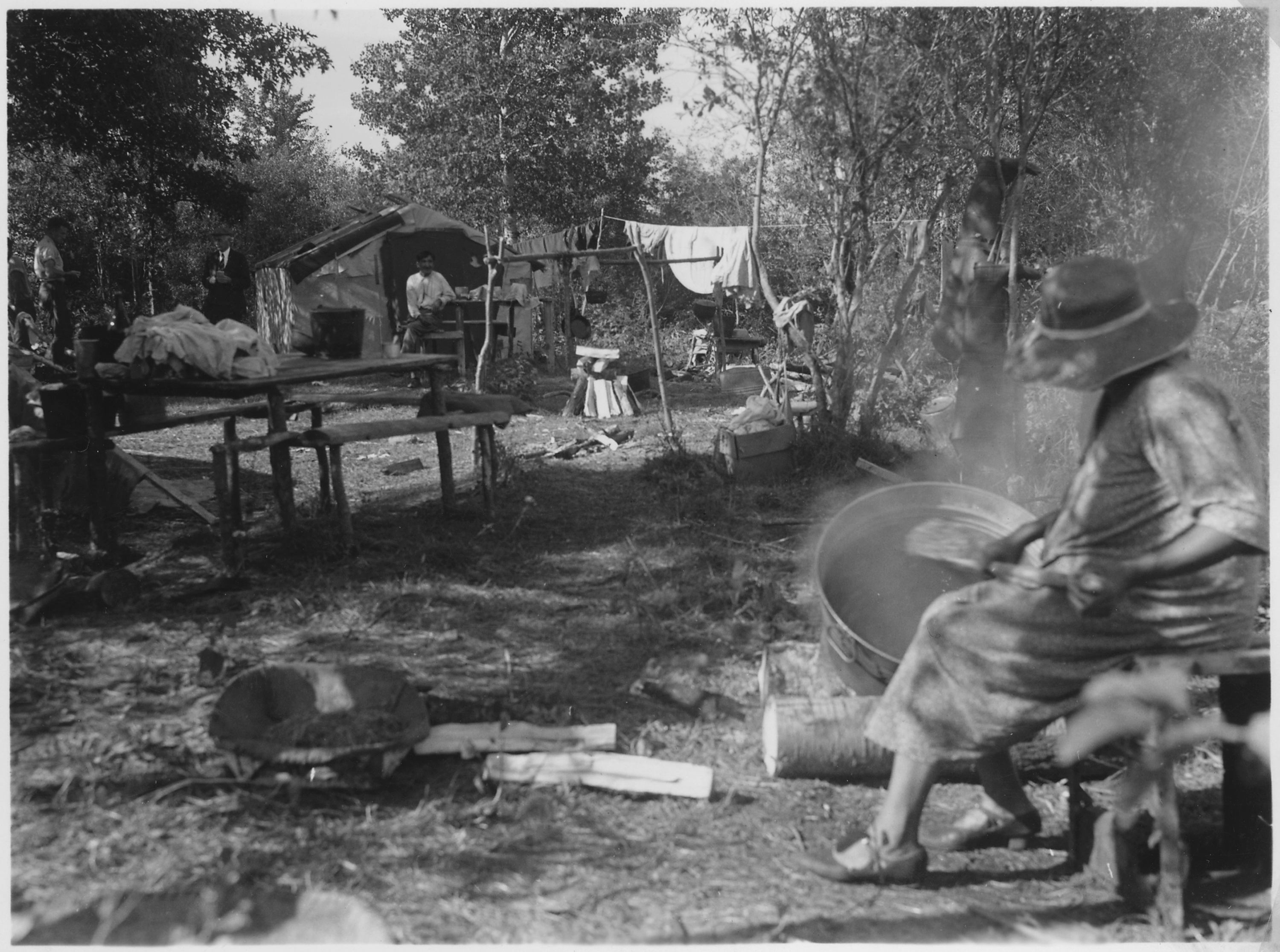
Camping scene at Laura Lake during wild rice harvest, 1937

- Bailey Lake
- Big Rice Lake (vast majority)
- Big Sand Lake (south half)
- Dollar Lake
- Laura Lake (northeast three-quarters)
- Moon Lake (southeast three-quarters)
- Ododikossi Lake
- Oxbow Lake
- Peterson Lake (east quarter)

=== Adjacent townships ===
- Slater Township (north)
- Lima Township (east)
- Thunder Lake Township (south)
- Trelipe Township (southwest)
- Inguadona Township (west)
- Rogers Township (northwest)

== Demographics ==
As of the census of 2000, there were 183 people, 73 households, and 51 families residing in the township. The population density was 6.3 people per square mile (2.4/km^{2}). There were 96 housing units at an average density of 3.3/sq mi (1.3/km^{2}). The racial makeup of the township was 97.81% White, 1.64% Native American, and 0.55% from two or more races.

There were 73 households, out of which 28.8% had children under the age of 18 living with them, 61.6% were married couples living together, 5.5% had a female householder with no husband present, and 28.8% were non-families. 21.9% of all households were made up of individuals, and 11.0% had someone living alone who was 65 years of age or older. The average household size was 2.51 and the average family size was 2.94.

In the township the population was spread out, with 24.6% under the age of 18, 7.7% from 18 to 24, 24.6% from 25 to 44, 30.6% from 45 to 64, and 12.6% who were 65 years of age or older. The median age was 39 years. For every 100 females, there were 94.7 males. For every 100 females age 18 and over, there were 97.1 males.

The median income for a household in the township was $35,000, and the median income for a family was $40,750. Males had a median income of $30,625 versus $24,375 for females. The per capita income for the township was $17,006. About 8.9% of families and 19.0% of the population were below the poverty line, including 7.7% of those under the age of eighteen and 25.9% of those 65 or over.
