= Hangaard Township, Clearwater County, Minnesota =

Township in Minnesota, United States

Hangaard Township
- Township
- Location of Hangaard Township, within Clearwater County, Minnesota
- Coordinates: 47°52′7″N 95°32′35″W
- Country: United States
- State: Minnesota
- County: Clearwater

Area
  - Total: 22.0 sq mi (56.9 km^{2})
  - Land: 22.0 sq mi (56.9 km^{2})
  - Water: 0 sq mi (0.0 km^{2})
- Elevation: 1,168 ft (356 m)

Population (2020)
  - Total: 6
  - Density: 0.27/sq mi (0.11/km^{2})
- Time zone: UTC-6 (Central (CST))
  - Summer (DST): UTC-5 (CDT)
- ZIP code: 56644
- Area code: 218
- FIPS code: 27-26954
- GNIS feature ID: 0664390

Hangaard Township is a township in Clearwater County, Minnesota, United States. The population was six at the 2020 census.

Hangaard Township was named for Gunder G. Hangaard, a pioneer settler and native of Norway.

== Geography ==
According to the United States Census Bureau, the township has a total area of 22.0 square miles (57 km^{2}), all land.

== Demographics ==
As of the census of 2000, there were 8 people, 4 households, and 2 families residing in the township. The population density was 0.4 inhabitants per square mile (0.15/km^{2}). There were 7 housing units at an average density of 0.3 per square mile (0.12/km^{2}). The racial makeup of the township was 100.00% White.

There were 4 households, out of which 25.0% had children under the age of 18 living with them, 25.0% were married couples living together, and 50.0% were non-families. 50.0% of all households were made up of individuals, and none had someone living alone who was 65 years of age or older. The average household size was 2.00 and the average family size was 3.00.

In the township the population was spread out, with 37.5% under the age of 18, 37.5% from 25 to 44, 25.0% from 45 to 64, . The median age was 32 years. For every 100 females, there were 166.7 males. For every 100 females age 18 and over, there were 400.0 males.

The median income for a household in the township was $50,417, and the median income for a family was $0. Males had a median income of $51,250 versus $0 for females. The per capita income for the township was $30,000. There were no families and 40.0% of the population living below the poverty line, including no under eighteens and none of those over 64.
