= La Prairie Township, Clearwater County, Minnesota =

Township in Minnesota, United States

La Prairie Township
- Township
- Location of La Prairie Township, within Clearwater County, Minnesota
- Coordinates: 47°17′47″N 95°27′36″W
- Country: United States
- State: Minnesota
- County: Clearwater

Area
  - Total: 107.0 sq mi (277.2 km^{2})
  - Land: 99.6 sq mi (257.9 km^{2})
  - Water: 7.5 sq mi (19.4 km^{2})
- Elevation: 1,637 ft (499 m)

Population (2020)
  - Total: 398
  - Density: 4.00/sq mi (1.54/km^{2})
- Time zone: UTC-6 (Central (CST))
  - Summer (DST): UTC-5 (CDT)
- FIPS code: 27-35630
- GNIS feature ID: 0664729

La Prairie Township is a township in Clearwater County, Minnesota, United States. The population was 398 at the 2020 census. It contains the census-designated places of Rice Lake and South End and part of Roy Lake.

== Geography ==
According to the United States Census Bureau, the township has a total area of 107.0 square miles (277 km^{2}), of which 99.6 square miles (258 km^{2}) is land and 7.5 square miles (19 km^{2}) (6.99%) is water.

== Demographics ==
As of the census of 2000, there were 371 people, 109 households, and 92 families residing in the township. The population density was 3.7 inhabitants per square mile (1.4/km^{2}). There were 144 housing units at an average density of 1.4 per square mile (0.54/km^{2}). The racial makeup of the township was 22.10% White, 75.74% Native American, and 2.16% from two or more races. Hispanic or Latino of any race were 2.70% of the population.

There were 109 households, out of which 44.0% had children under the age of 18 living with them, 43.1% were married couples living together, 20.2% had a female householder with no husband present, and 14.7% were non-families. 8.3% of all households were made up of individuals, and 0.9% had someone living alone who was 65 years of age or older. The average household size was 3.40 and the average family size was 3.47.

In the township the population was spread out, with 36.9% under the age of 18, 10.8% from 18 to 24, 25.3% from 25 to 44, 18.6% from 45 to 64, and 8.4% who were 65 years of age or older. The median age was 30 years. For every 100 females, there were 92.2 males. For every 100 females age 18 and over, there were 116.7 males.

The median income for a household in the township was $22,500, and the median income for a family was $22,813. Males had a median income of $22,083 versus $17,083 for females. The per capita income for the township was $11,949. About 38.5% of families and 43.1% of the population were below the poverty line, including 53.3% of those under age 18 and 59.3% of those age 65 or over.
