= Rice Lake (CDP), Minnesota =

Census-designated place in Minnesota, US

Rice Lake
- Census-designated place (CDP)
- Location of the census-designated place of Rice Lake within La Prairie Township, Clearwater County
- Coordinates: 47°22′59″N 95°30′4″W
- Country: United States
- State: Minnesota
- County: Clearwater
- Township: La Prairie Township

Area
  - Total: 10.68 sq mi (27.67 km^{2})
  - Land: 10.45 sq mi (27.06 km^{2})
  - Water: 0.24 sq mi (0.62 km^{2})
- Elevation: 1,483 ft (452 m)

Population (2020)
  - Total: 274
  - Density: 26.2/sq mi (10.13/km^{2})
- Time zone: UTC-6 (Central (CST))
  - Summer (DST): UTC-5 (CDT)
- ZIP code: 56621
- Area code: 218
- FIPS code: 27-54056
- GNIS feature ID: 1852584

Rice Lake is a census-designated place (CDP) in La Prairie Township, Clearwater County, Minnesota, United States, near Lower Rice Lake. The population was 235 at the 2010 census. It is located within ZIP code 56621 based in Bagley.

== Geography ==
According to the U.S. Census, the CDP has a total area of 10.7 square miles (28 km^{2}), of which, 10.4 square miles (27 km^{2}) is land and 0.2 square miles (0.52 km^{2}) (2.23%) is water.

== Demographics ==
Historical population
Census	Pop.	Note	%±
2020	274		—
U.S. Decennial Census

As of the census of 2000, there were 226 people, 61 households, and 53 families residing in the CDP. The population density was 29.4 inhabitants per square mile (11.4/km^{2}). There were 65 housing units at an average density of 8.5/sq mi (3.3/km^{2}). The racial makeup of the CDP was 13.27% White, 84.96% Native American, and 1.77% from two or more races. Hispanic or Latino of any race were 3.54% of the population.

There were 61 households, out of which 42.6% had children under the age of 18 living with them, 42.6% were married couples living together, 18.0% had a female householder with no husband present, and 13.1% were non-families. 1.6% of all households were made up of individuals, and none had someone living alone who was 65 years of age or older. The average household size was 3.70 and the average family size was 3.66.

In the CDP, the population was spread out, with 37.6% under the age of 18, 11.9% from 18 to 24, 22.6% from 25 to 44, 19.9% from 45 to 64, and 8.0% who were 65 years of age or older. The median age was 26 years. For every 100 females, there were 83.7 males. For every 100 females age 18 and over, there were 120.3 males.

The median income for a household is $22,083, and the median income for a family was $22,813. Males had a median income of $17,500 versus $16,875 for females. The per capita income for the CDP was $10,124. About 39.1% of families and 45.9% of the population were below the poverty line, including 63.5% of those under the age of eighteen and 50.0% of those 65 or over.
