= Falk Township, Clearwater County, Minnesota =

Township in Minnesota, United States

Falk Township
- Township
- Location of Falk Township, within Clearwater County, Minnesota
- Coordinates: 47°28′20″N 95°29′17″W
- Country: United States
- State: Minnesota
- County: Clearwater

Area
  - Total: 36.5 sq mi (94.6 km^{2})
  - Land: 36.3 sq mi (93.9 km^{2})
  - Water: 0.27 sq mi (0.7 km^{2})
- Elevation: 1,510 ft (460 m)

Population (2020)
  - Total: 277
  - Density: 7.64/sq mi (2.95/km^{2})
- Time zone: UTC-6 (Central (CST))
  - Summer (DST): UTC-5 (CDT)
- ZIP code: 56621
- Area code: 218
- FIPS code: 27-20438
- GNIS feature ID: 0664138

Falk Township is a township in Clearwater County, Minnesota, United States. The population was 277 at the 2020 census. It contains the census-designated place of Ebro.

== Geography ==
According to the United States Census Bureau, the township has a total area of 36.5 square miles (95 km^{2}), of which 36.3 square miles (94 km^{2}) is land and 0.3 square miles (0.78 km^{2}) (0.74%) is water.

== Demographics ==
As of the census of 2000, there were 261 people, 87 households, and 70 families residing in the township. The population density was 7.2 inhabitants per square mile (2.8/km^{2}). There were 95 housing units at an average density of 2.6 per square mile (1.0/km^{2}). The racial makeup of the township was 70.88% White, 23.37% Native American, and 5.75% from two or more races.

There were 87 households, out of which 42.5% had children under the age of 18 living with them, 62.1% were married couples living together, 14.9% had a female householder with no husband present, and 18.4% were non-families. 17.2% of all households were made up of individuals, and 6.9% had someone living alone who was 65 years of age or older. The average household size was 3.00 and the average family size was 3.27.

In the township the population was spread out, with 33.7% under the age of 18, 11.1% from 18 to 24, 26.1% from 25 to 44, 19.9% from 45 to 64, and 9.2% who were 65 years of age or older. The median age was 31 years. For every 100 females, there were 93.3 males. For every 100 females age 18 and over, there were 92.2 males.

The median income for a household in the township was $20,313, and the median income for a family was $22,750. Males had a median income of $21,042 versus $13,750 for females. The per capita income for the township was $9,554. About 31.9% of families and 32.7% of the population were below the poverty line, including 30.7% of those under the age of eighteen and 54.5% of those 65 or over.
