= Greenwood Township, Clearwater County, Minnesota =

Township in Minnesota, United States

Greenwood Township
- Township
- Location of Greenwood Township, within Clearwater County, Minnesota
- Coordinates: 47°47′59″N 95°23′16″W
- Country: United States
- State: Minnesota
- County: Clearwater

Area
  - Total: 23.7 sq mi (61.4 km^{2})
  - Land: 23.7 sq mi (61.4 km^{2})
  - Water: 0 sq mi (0.0 km^{2})
- Elevation: 1,201 ft (366 m)

Population (2020)
  - Total: 78
  - Density: 3.3/sq mi (1.3/km^{2})
- Time zone: UTC-6 (Central (CST))
  - Summer (DST): UTC-5 (CDT)
- ZIP code: 56634
- Area code: 218
- FIPS code: 27-25910
- GNIS feature ID: 0664350

Greenwood Township is a township in Clearwater County, Minnesota, United States. The population was 78 at the 2020 census.

Greenwood Township was probably named for its woodlands.

== Geography ==
According to the United States Census Bureau, the township has a total area of 23.7 square miles (61 km^{2}), all land.

== Demographics ==
As of the census of 2000, there were 96 people, 35 households, and 28 families residing in the township. The population density was 4.0 inhabitants per square mile (1.5/km^{2}). There were 44 housing units at an average density of 1.9 per square mile (0.73/km^{2}). The racial makeup of the township was 93.75% White, 1.04% African American, 1.04% Native American, and 4.17% from two or more races.

There were 35 households, out of which 37.1% had children under the age of 18 living with them, 77.1% were married couples living together, and 20.0% were non-families. 11.4% of all households were made up of individuals, and 2.9% had someone living alone who was 65 years of age or older. The average household size was 2.74 and the average family size was 3.04.

In the township the population was spread out, with 25.0% under the age of 18, 8.3% from 18 to 24, 28.1% from 25 to 44, 18.8% from 45 to 64, and 19.8% who were 65 years of age or older. The median age was 41 years. For every 100 females, there were 134.1 males. For every 100 females age 18 and over, there were 140.0 males.

The median income for a household in the township was $23,125, and the median income for a family was $27,500. Males had a median income of $30,000 versus $32,917 for females. The per capita income for the township was $10,259. There were 29.4% of families and 32.4% of the population living below the poverty line, including 38.5% of under eighteens and 22.6% of those over 64.
