= Alida, Minnesota =

Unincorporated community in Minnesota, United States

Alida
- Unincorporated community
- Location within Minnesota Location within the United States
- Coordinates: 47°23′01″N 95°14′05″W
- Country: United States
- State: Minnesota
- County: Clearwater
- Elevation: 1,522 ft (464 m)
- Time zone: UTC-6 (Central (CST))
  - Summer (DST): UTC-5 (CDT)
- Area code: 218
- GNIS feature ID: 639281

Alida is an unincorporated community in Clearwater County, in the U.S. state of Minnesota.

== History ==
A post office was established at Alida in 1898, and remained in operation until being discontinued in 1945. The community was named by John Lind, 14th governor of Minnesota, perhaps after a place of the same name in Indiana or Kansas.
