= Shevlin Township, Clearwater County, Minnesota =

Township in Minnesota, United States

Shevlin Township
- Township
- Location of Shevlin Township, within Clearwater County, Minnesota
- Coordinates: 47°32′12″N 95°14′44″W
- Country: United States
- State: Minnesota
- County: Clearwater

Area
  - Total: 31.0 sq mi (80.4 km^{2})
  - Land: 31.0 sq mi (80.4 km^{2})
  - Water: 0.039 sq mi (0.1 km^{2})
- Elevation: 1,447 ft (441 m)

Population (2020)
  - Total: 473
  - Density: 15.2/sq mi (5.88/km^{2})
- Time zone: UTC-6 (Central (CST))
  - Summer (DST): UTC-5 (CDT)
- ZIP code: 56676
- Area code: 218
- FIPS code: 27-59800
- GNIS feature ID: 0665598

Shevlin Township is a township in Clearwater County, Minnesota, United States of America. The population was 473 at the 2020 census.

Shevlin Township was named after Thomas Henry Shevlin, a businessman in the lumber industry.

== Geography ==
According to the United States Census Bureau, the township has a total area of 31.1 square miles (80.4 km^{2}), of which 31.0 square miles (80.4 km^{2}) is land and 0.04 square mile (0.1 km^{2}) (0.10%) is water.

== Demographics ==
As of the census of 2000, there were 434 people, 148 households, and 122 families residing in the township. The population density was 14.0 people per square mile (5.4/km^{2}). There were 157 housing units at an average density of 5.1/sq mi (2.0/km^{2}). The racial makeup of the township was 99.31% White, 0.46% Native American, and 0.23% from two or more races. Hispanic or Latino of any race were 0.23% of the population.

There were 148 households, out of which 41.2% had children under the age of 18 living with them, 70.3% were married couples living together, 9.5% had a female householder with no husband present, and 16.9% were non-families. 14.2% of all households were made up of individuals, and 4.7% had someone living alone who was 65 years of age or older. The average household size was 2.89 and the average family size was 3.21.

In the township the population was spread out, with 32.3% under the age of 18, 7.6% from 18 to 24, 27.9% from 25 to 44, 21.9% from 45 to 64, and 10.4% who were 65 years of age or older. The median age was 35 years. For every 100 females, there were 105.7 males. For every 100 females age 18 and over, there were 105.6 males.

The median income for a household in the township was $31,389, and the median income for a family was $35,694. Males had a median income of $25,417 versus $21,042 for females. The per capita income for the township was $16,534. About 9.0% of families and 9.7% of the population were below the poverty line, including 10.4% of those under age 18 and 3.2% of those age 65 or over.
