= Eddy Township, Clearwater County, Minnesota =

Township in Minnesota, United States

Eddy Township
- Township
- Location of Eddy Township, within Clearwater County, Minnesota
- Coordinates: 47°38′16″N 95°28′59″W
- Country: United States
- State: Minnesota
- County: Clearwater

Area
  - Total: 35.6 sq mi (92.2 km^{2})
  - Land: 34.8 sq mi (90.2 km^{2})
  - Water: 0.77 sq mi (2.0 km^{2})
- Elevation: 1,427 ft (435 m)

Population (2020)
  - Total: 303
  - Density: 8.70/sq mi (3.36/km^{2})
- Time zone: UTC-6 (Central (CST))
  - Summer (DST): UTC-5 (CDT)
- ZIP code: 56634
- Area code: 218
- FIPS code: 27-18008
- GNIS feature ID: 0664040

Eddy Township is a township in Clearwater County, Minnesota, United States. The population was 303 at the 2020 census.

Eddy Township was named for Frank Eddy, a Minnesota congressman.

== Geography ==
According to the United States Census Bureau, the township has a total area of 35.6 square miles (92 km^{2}), of which 34.8 square miles (90 km^{2}) is land and 0.8 square miles (2.1 km^{2}) (2.16%) is water.

== Demographics ==
As of the census of 2000, there were 322 people, 133 households, and 94 families residing in the township. The population density was 9.2 inhabitants per square mile (3.6/km^{2}). There were 151 housing units at an average density of 4.3 per square mile (1.7/km^{2}). The racial makeup of the township was 97.83% White, 0.62% African American, 0.62% Native American, 0.62% Asian, 0.31% from other races. Hispanic or Latino of any race were 0.62% of the population.

There were 133 households, out of which 27.8% had children under the age of 18 living with them, 64.7% were married couples living together, 5.3% had a female householder with no husband present, and 28.6% were non-families. 27.8% of all households were made up of individuals, and 12.8% had someone living alone who was 65 years of age or older. The average household size was 2.42 and the average family size was 2.97.

In the township the population was spread out, with 24.8% under the age of 18, 5.3% from 18 to 24, 22.7% from 25 to 44, 27.3% from 45 to 64, and 19.9% who were 65 years of age or older. The median age was 43 years. For every 100 females, there were 103.8 males. For every 100 females age 18 and over, there were 101.7 males.

The median income for a household in the township was $30,357, and the median income for a family was $44,000. Males had a median income of $22,500 versus $23,750 for females. The per capita income for the township was $20,293. About 6.0% of families and 7.3% of the population were below the poverty line, including 1.1% of those under age 18 and 23.6% of those age 65 or over.
