= Sinclair Township, Clearwater County, Minnesota =

Township in Minnesota, United States

Sinclair Township
- Township
- Location of Sinclair Township, within Clearwater County, Minnesota
- Coordinates: 47°43′58″N 95°14′56″W
- Country: United States
- State: Minnesota
- County: Clearwater

Area
  - Total: 36.3 sq mi (93.9 km^{2})
  - Land: 34.5 sq mi (89.4 km^{2})
  - Water: 1.7 sq mi (4.5 km^{2})
- Elevation: 1,322 ft (403 m)

Population (2020)
  - Total: 142
  - Density: 4.11/sq mi (1.59/km^{2})
- Time zone: UTC-6 (Central (CST))
  - Summer (DST): UTC-5 (CDT)
- ZIP code: 56652
- Area code: 218
- FIPS code: 27-60502
- GNIS feature ID: 0665619

Sinclair Township is a township in Clearwater County, Minnesota, United States. The population was 142 at the 2020 census.

Sinclair Township was named for a government surveyor.

== Geography ==
According to the United States Census Bureau, the township has a total area of 36.2 square miles (93.9 km^{2}), of which 34.5 square miles (89.4 km^{2}) is land and 1.7 square miles (4.5 km^{2}) (4.77%) is water.

== Demographics ==
As of the census of 2000, there were 175 people, 79 households, and 51 families residing in the township. The population density was 5.1 people per square mile (2.0/km^{2}). There were 137 housing units at an average density of 4.0/sq mi (1.5/km^{2}). The racial makeup of the township was 100.00% White.

There were 79 households, out of which 24.1% had children under the age of 18 living with them, 58.2% were married couples living together, 3.8% had a female householder with no husband present, and 34.2% were non-families. 30.4% of all households were made up of individuals, and 17.7% had someone living alone who was 65 years of age or older. The average household size was 2.22 and the average family size was 2.77.

In the township the population was spread out, with 20.6% under the age of 18, 3.4% from 18 to 24, 24.6% from 25 to 44, 30.9% from 45 to 64, and 20.6% who were 65 years of age or older. The median age was 48 years. For every 100 females, there were 108.3 males. For every 100 females age 18 and over, there were 117.2 males.

The median income for a household in the township was $40,000, and the median income for a family was $44,583. Males had a median income of $24,167 versus $20,000 for females. The per capita income for the township was $22,163. About 3.6% of families and 11.8% of the population were below the poverty line, including 27.8% of those under the age of eighteen and 17.6% of those 65 or over.
