= North Clearwater, Minnesota =

Unorganized territory of Clearwater County, Minnesota, United States

Coordinates: 47°55′33″N 95°23′14″W

- Unorganized territory
- Location of North Clearwater, within Clearwater County, Minnesota
- Country: United States
- State: Minnesota
- County: Clearwater

Area
  - Total: 192.06 sq mi (497.4 km^{2})
  - Land: 188.35 sq mi (487.8 km^{2})
  - Water: 3.71 sq mi (9.6 km^{2})

Population (2020)
  - Total: 70
  - Density: 0.37/sq mi (0.14/km^{2})
- Time zone: UTC-6 (Central (CST))
  - Summer (DST): UTC-5 (CDT)
- Area code: 218

North Clearwater is an unorganized territory in Clearwater County, Minnesota, United States. The population was 70 at the time of the 2020 census.

== Geography ==
According to the United States Census Bureau, the unorganized territory has a total area of 191.9 square miles (497.1 km^{2}), of which 187.1 square miles (484.7 km^{2}) is land and 4.8 square miles (12.4 km^{2}) (2.50%) is water.

This unorganized territory falls completely within the boundaries of the Red Lake Indian Reservation.

== Demographics ==
As of the census of 2020, there were 70 people and 20 households residing in the unorganized territory. The population density was 0.4 inhabitants per square mile (0.15/km^{2}). There were 25 housing units. The racial makeup of the unorganized territory was 4.28% White, 1.43% Asian, and 91.43% Native American or Alaska Native. 2.86% reported two or more races. Hispanic or Latino of any race were 4.29% of the population.

There were 20 households, out of which none reported having children under the age of 18 living with them. 55% of responders reported as having been widowed. 45% reported as having never married. 55% of households had someone living alone who was 65 years of age or older. The average household size was unreported.

In the unorganized territory the population was relatively concentrated, with 45% of responders being from 55 to 59 years old, and 55% who were 65 years of age or older. The median age was unreported. All responders were male.

The median income for a household in the unorganized territory was unreported. The per capita income for the unorganized territory was $9,389. 45% were reported as living below the poverty line, none of whom were over 64.
