= Long Lost Lake Township, Clearwater County, Minnesota =

Township in Minnesota, United States

Long Lost Lake Township
- Township
- Location of Long Lost Lake Township, within Clearwater County, Minnesota
- Coordinates: 47°12′N 95°19′W
- Country: United States
- State: Minnesota
- County: Clearwater
- Organized: 2005

Area
  - Total: 36.10 sq mi (93.5 km^{2})
  - Land: 33.83 sq mi (87.6 km^{2})
  - Water: 2.28 sq mi (5.9 km^{2})

Population (2020)
  - Total: 54
  - Density: 1.6/sq mi (0.62/km^{2})
- Time zone: UTC-6 (Central (CST))
  - Summer (DST): UTC-5 (CDT)
- FIPS code: 27-38042
- GNIS feature ID: 2392573

Long Lost Lake Township is a township in Clearwater County, Minnesota, United States. The population was 54 at the 2020 census. The township was organized in 2005, having previously existed as a survey township and unorganized territory.
