= South End, Minnesota =

Census-designated place in Minnesota, US

South End
- Census-designated place
- Location within Minnesota
- Coordinates: 47°19′23″N 95°28′43″W
- Country: United States
- State: Minnesota
- County: Clearwater

Area
  - Total: 1.77 sq mi (4.58 km^{2})
  - Land: 1.77 sq mi (4.58 km^{2})
  - Water: 0 sq mi (0.00 km^{2})
- Elevation: 1,519 ft (463 m)

Population (2020)
  - Total: 34
  - Density: 19.2/sq mi (7.43/km^{2})
- Time zone: UTC-6 (Central (CST))
  - Summer (DST): UTC-5 (CDT)
- Area code: 218
- GNIS feature ID: 2628824

South End is a census-designated place in La Prairie Township, Clearwater County, Minnesota, United States. As of the 2020 census, South End had a population of 34.

== Demographics ==
Historical population
Census	Pop.	Note	%±
2020	34		—
U.S. Decennial Census

== Education ==
The community is served by Bagley School District 162.
