= South Clearwater, Minnesota =

Unorganized territory of Clearwater County, Minnesota, United States

Coordinates: 47°11′44″N 95°17′52″W

- Unorganized territory
- Location of South Clearwater, within Clearwater County, Minnesota
- Country: United States
- State: Minnesota
- County: Clearwater

Area
  - Total: 36.07 sq mi (93.4 km^{2})
  - Land: 32.30 sq mi (83.7 km^{2})
  - Water: 3.77 sq mi (9.8 km^{2})

Population (2020)
  - Total: 8
  - Density: 0.25/sq mi (0.096/km^{2})
- Time zone: UTC-6 (Central (CST))
  - Summer (DST): UTC-5 (CDT)
- Area code: 218

South Clearwater is an unorganized territory in Clearwater County, Minnesota, United States. The population was 8 at the 2020 census, down from 10 in 2010.

== Geography ==
According to the United States Census Bureau, the unorganized territory has a total area of 72.2 square miles (186.9 km^{2}), of which 65.8 square miles (170.4 km^{2}) is land and 6.4 square miles (16.5 km^{2}) (8.81%) is water. Much of Itasca State Park is located in the township.

== Demographics ==
As of the census of 2000, there were 72 people, 31 households, and 23 families residing in the unorganized territory. The population density was 1.1 inhabitants per square mile (0.42/km^{2}). There were 121 housing units at an average density of 1.8 per square mile (0.69/km^{2}). The racial makeup of the unorganized territory was 63.89% White and 36.11% Native American.

There were 31 households, out of which 22.6% had children under the age of 18 living with them, 58.1% were married couples living together, 12.9% had a female householder with no husband present, and 25.8% were non-families. 22.6% of all households were made up of individuals, and 16.1% had someone living alone who was 65 years of age or older. The average household size was 2.32 and the average family size was 2.74.

In the unorganized territory the population was spread out, with 25.0% under the age of 18, 5.6% from 18 to 24, 11.1% from 25 to 44, 37.5% from 45 to 64, and 20.8% who were 65 years of age or older. The median age was 49 years. For every 100 females, there were 89.5 males. For every 100 females age 18 and over, there were 92.9 males.

The median income for a household in the unorganized territory was $37,321, and the median income for a family was $80,215. Males had a median income of $65,156 versus $17,143 for females. The per capita income for the unorganized territory was $25,478. There were no families and 13.6% of the population living below the poverty line, including no under eighteens and none of those over 64.
