= Peterson Lake (Clearwater County, Minnesota) =

Lake in the state of Minnesota, United States

- Location within Minnesota
- Location: Clearwater County, Minnesota
- Coordinates: 47°39′47″N 95°23′23″W
- Type: lake

Peterson Lake is a lake in Clearwater County, Minnesota, in the United States.

Peterson Lake was named for Nels M. Peterson, who owned land there.

== See also ==
- List of lakes in Minnesota
