= Popple Township, Clearwater County, Minnesota =

Township in Minnesota, United States

Popple Township
- Township
- Location of Popple Township, within Clearwater County, Minnesota
- Coordinates: 47°31′48″N 95°29′5″W
- Country: United States
- State: Minnesota
- County: Clearwater

Area
  - Total: 35.8 sq mi (92.6 km^{2})
  - Land: 34.9 sq mi (90.3 km^{2})
  - Water: 0.93 sq mi (2.4 km^{2})
- Elevation: 1,496 ft (456 m)

Population (2020)
  - Total: 535
  - Density: 15.3/sq mi (5.92/km^{2})
- Time zone: UTC-6 (Central (CST))
  - Summer (DST): UTC-5 (CDT)
- ZIP code: 56621
- Area code: 218
- FIPS code: 27-52018
- GNIS feature ID: 0665340

Popple Township is a township in Clearwater County, Minnesota, United States. The population was 535 at the 2020 census.

Popple Township was named after the poplar tree.

== Geography ==
According to the United States Census Bureau, the township has a total area of 35.8 square miles (92.6 km^{2}), of which 34.9 square miles (90.3 km^{2}) is land and 0.9 square mile (2.4 km^{2}) (2.54%) is water.

== Demographics ==
As of the census of 2000, there were 564 people, 207 households, and 151 families residing in the township. The population density was 16.2 people per square mile (6.2/km^{2}). There were 238 housing units at an average density of 6.8/sq mi (2.6/km^{2}). The racial makeup of the township was 89.01% White, 0.18% African American, 7.09% Native American, 0.35% Asian, 1.06% from other races, and 2.30% from two or more races. Hispanic or Latino of any race were 2.30% of the population.

There were 207 households, out of which 34.8% had children under the age of 18 living with them, 63.3% were married couples living together, 4.8% had a female householder with no husband present, and 26.6% were non-families. 20.3% of all households were made up of individuals, and 9.2% had someone living alone who was 65 years of age or older. The average household size was 2.72 and the average family size was 3.16.

In the township the population was spread out, with 29.4% under the age of 18, 8.9% from 18 to 24, 23.4% from 25 to 44, 27.8% from 45 to 64, and 10.5% who were 65 years of age or older. The median age was 35 years. For every 100 females, there were 105.1 males. For every 100 females age 18 and over, there were 105.2 males.

The median income for a household in the township was $35,795, and the median income for a family was $39,821. Males had a median income of $28,542 versus $21,250 for females. The per capita income for the township was $14,611. About 7.5% of families and 12.5% of the population were below the poverty line, including 13.8% of those under age 18 and 18.3% of those age 65 or over.
