= Kirk Lake (Minnesota) =

Lake in the state of Minnesota, United States

- Location within Minnesota
- Location: Clearwater County, Minnesota
- Coordinates: 47°9′24″N 95°15′12″W
- Type: lake

Kirk Lake is a lake in Clearwater County, Minnesota, in the United States.

Kirk Lake was named for Thomas H. Kirk, a Minnesota historian and writer.

== See also ==
- List of lakes in Minnesota
