= Winsor Township, Clearwater County, Minnesota =

Township in Minnesota, United States

Winsor Township
- Township
- Location of Winsor Township, within Clearwater County, Minnesota
- Coordinates: 47°47′6″N 95°29′42″W
- Country: United States
- State: Minnesota
- County: Clearwater

Area
  - Total: 35.9 sq mi (92.9 km^{2})
  - Land: 35.7 sq mi (92.5 km^{2})
  - Water: 0.15 sq mi (0.4 km^{2})
- Elevation: 1,175 ft (358 m)

Population (2020)
  - Total: 120
  - Density: 3.4/sq mi (1.3/km^{2})
- Time zone: UTC-6 (Central (CST))
  - Summer (DST): UTC-5 (CDT)
- ZIP code: 56644
- Area code: 218
- FIPS code: 27-71068
- GNIS feature ID: 0666026

Winsor Township is a township in Clearwater County, Minnesota, United States. The population was 120 at the 2020 census.

Winsor Township was named for Hans C. Widness, an early settler and native of Norway.

== Geography ==
According to the United States Census Bureau, the township has a total area of 35.9 square miles (92.9 km^{2}), of which 35.7 square miles (92.5 km^{2}) is land and 0.1 square mile (0.4 km^{2}) (0.39%) is water.

== Demographics ==
As of the census of 2000, there were 146 people, 56 households, and 38 families residing in the township. The population density was 4.1 people per square mile (1.6/km^{2}). There were 77 housing units at an average density of 2.2/sq mi (0.8/km^{2}). The racial makeup of the township was 100.00% White.

There were 56 households, of which 35.7% had children under the age of 18 living with them, 66.1% were married couples living together, and 30.4% were non-families. 28.6% of all households were made up of individuals, and 8.9% had someone living alone who was 65 years of age or older. The average household size was 2.61 and the average family size was 3.26.

In the township the population was spread out, with 30.1% under the age of 18, 5.5% from 18 to 24, 26.0% from 25 to 44, 24.0% from 45 to 64, and 14.4% who were 65 years of age or older. The median age was 39 years. For every 100 females, there were 143.3 males. For every 100 females age 18 and over, there were 148.8 males.

The median income for a household in the township was $29,107, and the median income for a family was $50,417. Males had a median income of $33,125 versus $24,375 for females. The per capita income for the township was $15,375. There were none of the families and 1.7% of the population living below the poverty line, including no under eighteens and none of those over 64.
