= Jacobson, Minnesota =

Unincorporated community in Minnesota, US

Jacobson
- Unincorporated community
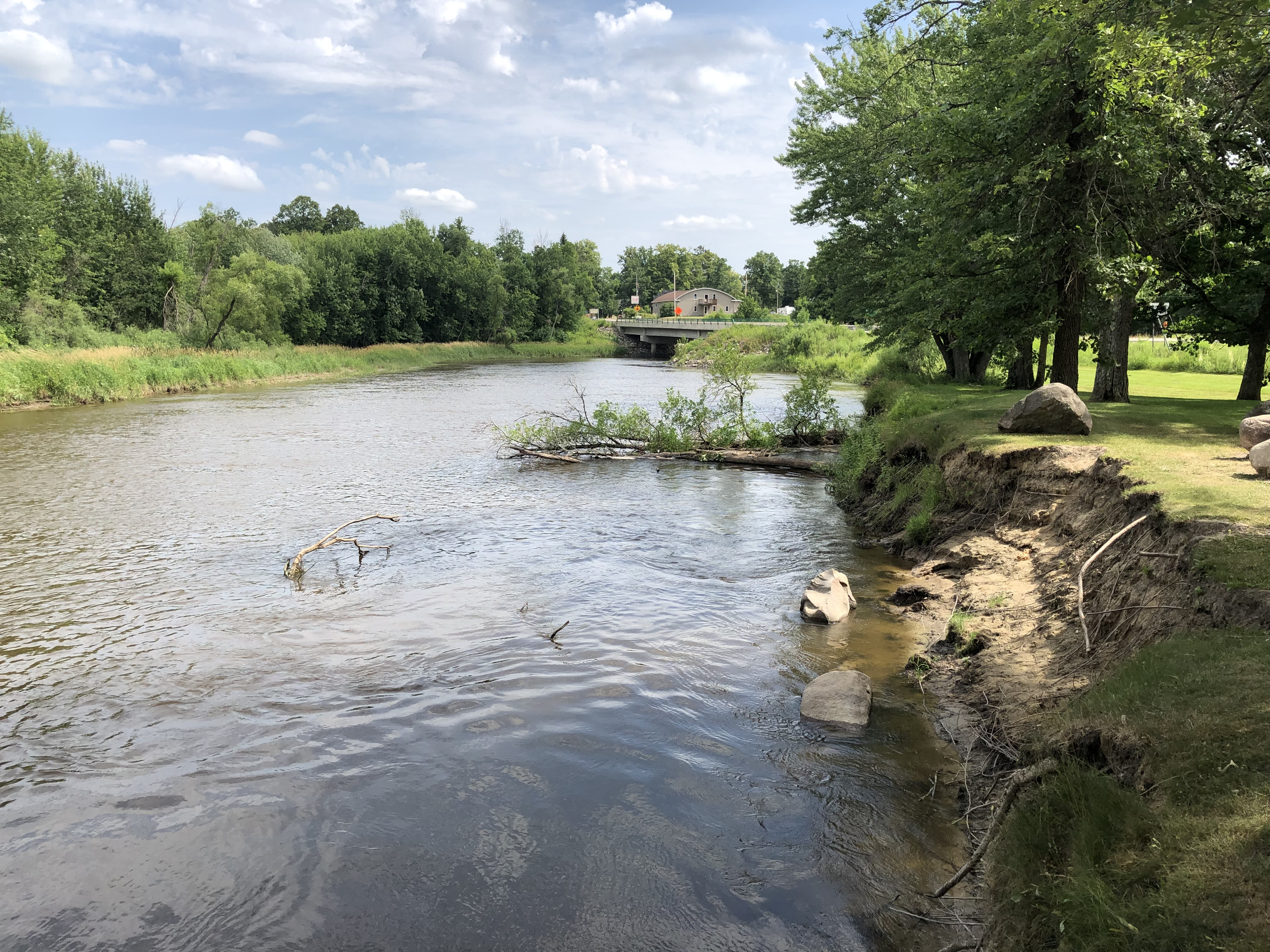
- The Mississippi River crossed by Highway 200 on the west edge of Jacobson

- Location within Minnesota Location within the United States
- Coordinates: 47°00′03″N 93°16′03″W
- Country: United States
- State: Minnesota
- County: Aitkin County
- Township: Ball Bluff
- Elevation: 1,253 ft (382 m)
- ZIP code: 55752
- Area code: 218
- GNIS feature ID: 0645574

Jacobson is an unincorporated community in Ball Bluff Township, Aitkin County, Minnesota, United States.

Formerly a logging town known as "Mississippi Landing", it is named after Paul Jacobson, who served as the first postmaster.

Minnesota State Highways 65 and 200 are two of the main routes in the community.

== Community ==
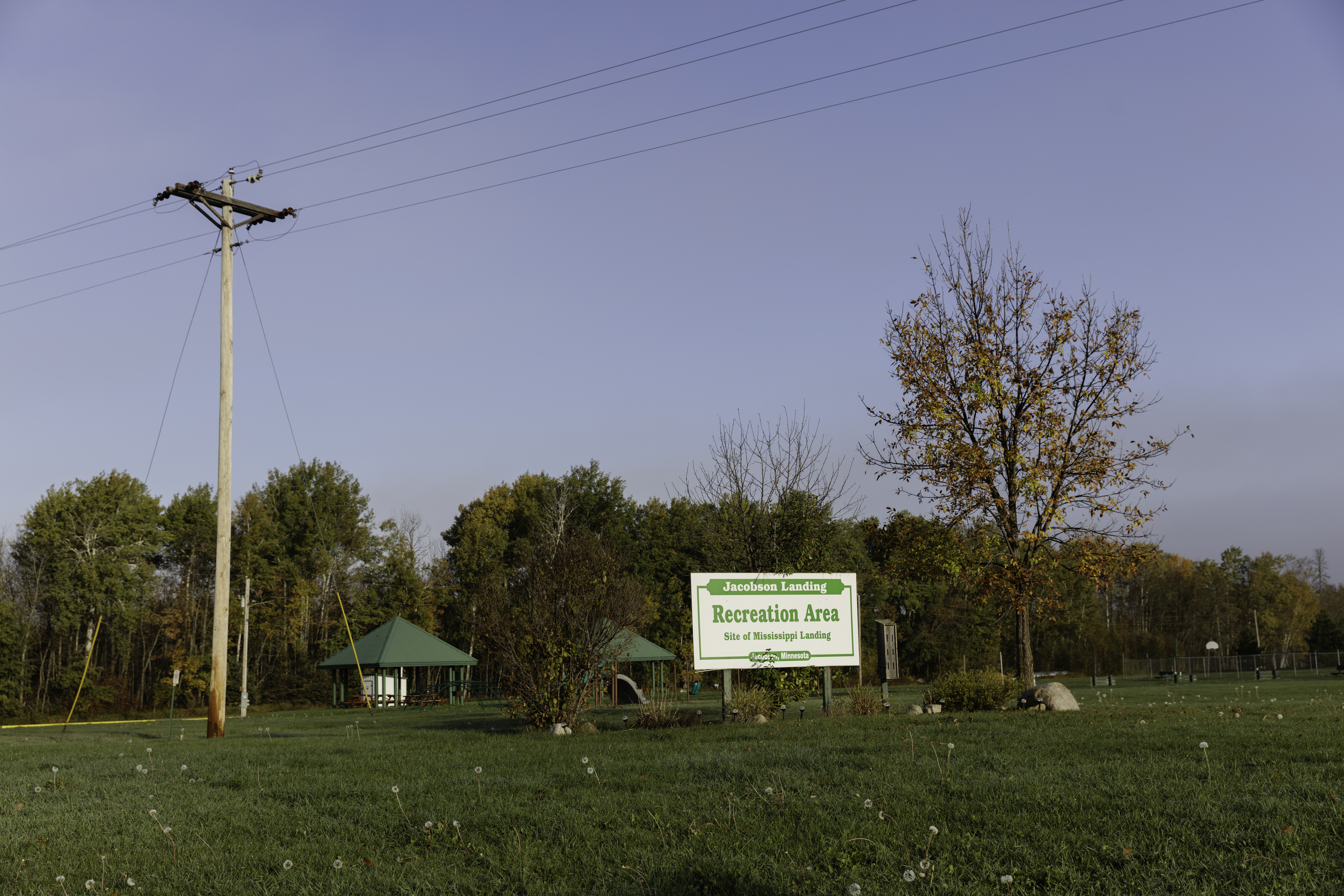
Jacobson Landing Recreation Area in Jacobson, Minnesota

Jacobson consists of a gas station, Mississippi Landing; a campground right off the banks of the river; three churches of different denominations; and a bar, The Forestry Station. There is also a park with a baseball diamond and a playground.
