= Brooks, Minnesota =

City in Minnesota, United States

Brooks
- City
- Location of Brooks, Minnesota
- Coordinates: 47°49′2″N 96°0′21″W
- Country: United States
- State: Minnesota
- County: Red Lake

Area
  - Total: 1.15 sq mi (2.98 km^{2})
  - Land: 1.15 sq mi (2.98 km^{2})
  - Water: 0 sq mi (0.00 km^{2})
- Elevation: 1,129 ft (344 m)

Population (2020)
  - Total: 117
  - Density: 102/sq mi (39.2/km^{2})
- Time zone: UTC-6 (Central (CST))
  - Summer (DST): UTC-5 (CDT)
- ZIP code: 56715
- Area code: 218
- FIPS code: 27-08038
- GNIS feature ID: 0640513
- Website: brooksmn.com

Brooks is a city in Red Lake County, Minnesota, United States. The population was 117 at the 2020 census.

== Geography ==
According to the United States Census Bureau, the city has a total area of 1.17 square miles (3.03 km^{2}), all land.

U.S. Highway 59 and Minnesota Highway 92 are two of the main routes in the community.

== Demographics ==
Historical population
| Census | Pop. | Note | %± |
|---|---|---|---|
| 1960 | 148 | | — |
| 1970 | 163 | | 10.1% |
| 1980 | 173 | | 6.1% |
| 1990 | 158 | | −8.7% |
| 2000 | 141 | | −10.8% |
| 2010 | 141 | | 0.0% |
| 2020 | 117 | | −17.0% |
U.S. Decennial Census; 2020 Census

=== 2010 census ===
As of the census of 2010, there were 141 people, 60 households, and 36 families residing in the city. The population density was 120.5 inhabitants per square mile (46.5/km^{2}). There were 66 housing units at an average density of 56.4 per square mile (21.8/km^{2}). The racial makeup of the city was 96.5% White, 0.7% Native American, 1.4% Asian, and 1.4% from two or more races. Hispanic or Latino of any race were 0.7% of the population.

There were 60 households, of which 31.7% had children under the age of 18 living with them, 50.0% were married couples living together, 5.0% had a female householder with no husband present, 5.0% had a male householder with no wife present, and 40.0% were non-families. 28.3% of all households were made up of individuals, and 18.3% had someone living alone who was 65 years of age or older. The average household size was 2.35 and the average family size was 2.89.

The median age in the city was 37.5 years. 25.5% of residents were under the age of 18; 5% were between the ages of 18 and 24; 24.9% were from 25 to 44; 26.3% were from 45 to 64; and 18.4% were 65 years of age or older. The gender makeup of the city was 49.6% male and 50.4% female.

=== 2000 census ===
As of the census of 2000, there were 141 people, 61 households, and 37 families residing in the city. The population density was 121.3 inhabitants per square mile (46.8/km^{2}). There were 64 housing units at an average density of 55.0 per square mile (21.2/km^{2}). The racial makeup of the city was 100% White.

There were 61 households, out of which 29.5% had children under the age of 18 living with them, 50.8% were married couples living together, 4.9% had a female householder with no husband present, and 39.3% were non-families. 34.4% of all households were made up of individuals, and 23.0% had someone living alone who was 65 years of age or older. The average household size was 2.31 and the average family size was 3.

In the city, the population was spread out, with 24.8% under the age of 18, 11.3% from 18 to 24, 19.1% from 25 to 44, 23.4% from 45 to 64, and 21.3% who were 65 years of age or older. The median age was 42 years. For every 100 females, there were 110.4 males. For every 100 females age 18 and over, there were 96.3 males.

The median income for a household in the city was $25,417, and the median income for a family was $33,750. Males had a median income of $22,500 versus $16,250 for females. The per capita income for the city was $13,947. There were none of the families and 2.8% of the population living below the poverty line, including no under eighteens and 11.8% of those over 64.

== History ==
Brooks was established in 1904 as a station on the Soo Line Railroad. By 1926, Brooks had two general stores, a grocery store, a bank, hardware store, butcher shop, blacksmith shop, a livery barn, two saloons, a community hall and a hotel to accommodate travelers. Brooks was primarily a service town for the surrounding agricultural townships, and a creamery was established as the local dairying business developed on neighboring farms. After the invention of the cream separator, family farms in adjoining townships of Polk and Red Lake counties switched from subsistence agriculture to a market economy and became a part of the dairy industry.

=== Brooks Cheese Company ===
In 1926, the Brooks creamery was purchased by the owners of the cheese factory in nearby Terrebonne, who moved their operation to Brooks. The business was widely known as the Brooks Cheese Company. It was a cheese factory owned by the Parenteau family, which sold its product to the Kraft Foods company, and marketed its products throughout the Midwest. Local farmers would process the milk from their own cows by removing the butterfat or cream, which was hauled in cream cans to the cheese factory, while the skim milk or whey was fed to hogs raised on the same farm. The Brooks Cheese Company continued in business until the late 1970s, at which point the decline of the family farm and the predominance of monoculture and industrial agriculture eliminated the mixed agriculture that formerly had predominated in the area of Brooks.

Although the local history of Red Lake County blames the National Farmers Organization for organizing farmers to cooperative actions in withholding milk shipments, the reality is that Brooks Cheese Company could not compete with the major industrial cheese manufacturers and the development of agribusiness which portended the demise of the family farm. By the beginning of the 21st century, few dairy cows could be found within twenty miles of Brooks, whereas at one time virtually every quarter section could be counted on for the cream produced by 10 or 15 cows. Nonetheless, Brooks continues to be the site of an agricultural supply business, a gas station, and several other local businesses, as well as one church.
