= Mallard Lake (Aitkin County, Minnesota) =

Lake in the state of Minnesota, United States

- Location within Minnesota
- Location: Aitkin County, Minnesota
- Coordinates: 46°24′34″N 93°43′15″W
- Type: lake

Mallard Lake is a lake in Aitkin County, Minnesota, in the United States.

Mallard Lake was named for the mallard ducks seen there.

== See also ==
- List of lakes in Minnesota
