= Northeast Aitkin, Minnesota =

Unorganized territory of Aitkin County, Minnesota, United States

Coordinates: 46°56′49″N 93°08′12″W

- Unorganized territory
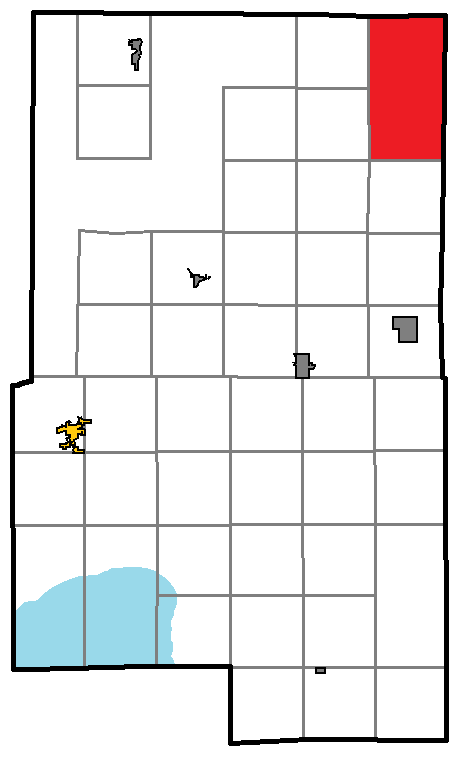
- Location of Northeast Aitkin within Aitkin County, Minnesota
- Country: United States
- State: Minnesota
- County: Aitkin

Area
  - Total: 74.04 sq mi (191.8 km^{2})
  - Land: 73.97 sq mi (191.6 km^{2})
  - Water: 0.07 sq mi (0.18 km^{2})

Population (2020)
  - Total: 8
  - Density: 0.11/sq mi (0.042/km^{2})
- Time zone: UTC-6 (Central (CST))
  - Summer (DST): UTC-5 (CDT)
- Area code: 218

Northeast Aitkin is an unorganized territory in Aitkin County, Minnesota, United States. The population was 8 at the 2020 census.

== Geography ==
According to the United States Census Bureau, the unorganized territory has a total area of 74.4 square miles (192.7 km^{2}), of which 74.3 square miles (192.5 km^{2}) is land and 0.077 square miles (0.2 km^{2}), or 0.10%, is water.

== Demographics ==
At the 2000 United States census there were 14 people, 6 households, and 4 families in the unorganized territory. The population density was 0.2 inhabitants per square mile (0.077/km^{2}). There were 11 housing units at an average density of 0.1 per square mile (0.039/km^{2}). The racial makeup of the unorganized territory was 100.00% White. Of the 6 households 16.7% had children under the age of 18 living with them, 66.7% were married couples living together, and 33.3% were non-families. 33.3% of households were one person and 16.7% were one person aged 65 or older. The average household size was 2.33 and the average family size was 3.00.

The age distribution was 21.4% under the age of 18, 7.1% from 18 to 24, 42.9% from 25 to 44, 21.4% from 45 to 64, and 7.1% 65 or older. The median age was 37 years. For every 100 females, there were 100.0 males. For every 100 females age 18 and over, there were 83.3 males.

The median household income was $23,750 and the median family income was $37,500. Males had a median income of $46,250 versus $0 for females. The per capita income for the unorganized territory was $16,210. None of the population or the families were below the poverty line.
