= Oklee, Minnesota =

City in Minnesota, United States

Oklee
- City
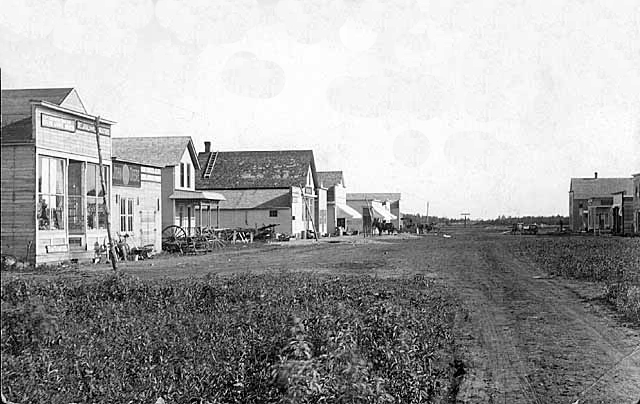
- Main Street, 1910

- Location of Oklee, Minnesota
- Coordinates: 47°50′15″N 95°51′12″W
- Country: United States
- State: Minnesota
- County: Red Lake

Area
  - Total: 0.75 sq mi (1.94 km^{2})
  - Land: 0.75 sq mi (1.94 km^{2})
  - Water: 0 sq mi (0.00 km^{2})
- Elevation: 1,152 ft (351 m)

Population (2020)
  - Total: 413
  - Density: 550.8/sq mi (212.65/km^{2})
- Time zone: UTC-6 (Central (CST))
  - Summer (DST): UTC-5 (CDT)
- ZIP code: 56742
- Area code: 218
- FIPS code: 27-48202
- GNIS feature ID: 0648913

Oklee (/ˈoʊkli/ OH-klee) is a city in Red Lake County, Minnesota, United States on Minnesota State Highway 222. As of the 2020 census, Oklee had a population of 413.

== Geography ==
According to the United States Census Bureau, the city has a total area of 0.60 square miles (1.55 km^{2}), all land.

== History ==
A post office called Oklee has been in operation since 1912. The city derives its name from O. K. Lee, the original owner of the town site.

== Demographics ==
Historical population
Census	Pop.	Note	%±
1920	364		—
1930	377		3.6%
1940	414		9.8%
1950	494		19.3%
1960	529		7.1%
1970	536		1.3%
1980	536		0.0%
1990	441		−17.7%
2000	396		−10.2%
2010	435		9.8%
2020	413		−5.1%
U.S. Decennial Census

=== 2010 census ===
As of the census of 2010, there were 435 people, 195 households, and 110 families residing in the city. The population density was 725.0 inhabitants per square mile (279.9/km^{2}). There were 225 housing units at an average density of 375.0 per square mile (144.8/km^{2}). The racial makeup of the city was 88.3% White, 9.0% Native American, 0.2% Asian, and 2.5% from two or more races. Hispanic or Latino of any race were 0.7% of the population.

There were 195 households, of which 25.6% had children under the age of 18 living with them, 42.6% were married couples living together, 8.7% had a female householder with no husband present, 5.1% had a male householder with no wife present, and 43.6% were non-families. 37.4% of all households were made up of individuals, and 21.1% had someone living alone who was 65 years of age or older. The average household size was 2.23 and the average family size was 2.91.

The median age in the city was 39.3 years. 24.6% of residents were under the age of 18; 6.8% were between the ages of 18 and 24; 24.9% were from 25 to 44; 22.2% were from 45 to 64; and 21.4% were 65 years of age or older. The gender makeup of the city was 50.6% male and 49.4% female.

=== 2000 census ===
As of the census of 2000, there were 396 people, 196 households, and 105 families residing in the city. The population density was 603.7 inhabitants per square mile (233.1/km^{2}). There were 229 housing units at an average density of 349.1 per square mile (134.8/km^{2}). The racial makeup of the city was 98.74% White, 1.01% Native American, and 0.25% from two or more races. Hispanic or Latino of any race were 0.25% of the population.

There were 196 households, out of which 26.5% had children under the age of 18 living with them, 42.3% were married couples living together, 9.2% had a female householder with no husband present, and 46.4% were non-families. 44.9% of all households were made up of individuals, and 26.5% had someone living alone who was 65 years of age or older. The average household size was 2.02 and the average family size was 2.85.

In the city, the population was spread out, with 24.7% under the age of 18, 5.8% from 18 to 24, 23.2% from 25 to 44, 19.9% from 45 to 64, and 26.3% who were 65 years of age or older. The median age was 42 years. For every 100 females, there were 90.4 males. For every 100 females age 18 and over, there were 82.8 males.

The median income for a household in the city was $23,214, and the median income for a family was $30,417. Males had a median income of $22,333 versus $18,500 for females. The per capita income for the city was $14,342. About 12.3% of families and 14.7% of the population were below the poverty line, including 27.5% of those under age 18 and 8.1% of those age 65 or over.
