= Ebro, Minnesota =

Census-designated place in Minnesota, US

Ebro
- Census-designated place
- Location within Minnesota
- Coordinates: 47°29′44″N 95°31′46″W
- Country: United States
- State: Minnesota
- County: Clearwater

Area
  - Total: 0.88 sq mi (2.27 km^{2})
  - Land: 0.88 sq mi (2.27 km^{2})
  - Water: 0 sq mi (0.00 km^{2})
- Elevation: 1,450 ft (440 m)

Population (2020)
  - Total: 50
  - Density: 57.2/sq mi (22.07/km^{2})
- Time zone: UTC-6 (Central (CST))
  - Summer (DST): UTC-5 (CDT)
- Area code: 218
- GNIS feature ID: 643146

Ebro is a census-designated place and unincorporated community in Falk Township, Clearwater County, Minnesota, United States. As of the 2020 census, Ebro had a population of 50.

== Demographics ==
Historical population
Census	Pop.	Note	%±
2020	50		—
U.S. Decennial Census

== History ==
A post office called Ebro was established in 1898, and remained in operation until it was discontinued in 1975. The community was named after the Ebro River, in Spain.
