= Rice Township, Clearwater County, Minnesota =

Township in Minnesota, United States

Rice Township
- Township
- Location of Rice Township, within Clearwater County, Minnesota
- Coordinates: 47°16′22″N 95°22′30″W
- Country: United States
- State: Minnesota
- County: Clearwater

Area
  - Total: 36.1 sq mi (93.4 km^{2})
  - Land: 34.9 sq mi (90.4 km^{2})
  - Water: 1.2 sq mi (3.0 km^{2})
- Elevation: 1,621 ft (494 m)

Population (2020)
  - Total: 162
  - Density: 4.64/sq mi (1.79/km^{2})
- Time zone: UTC-6 (Central (CST))
  - Summer (DST): UTC-5 (CDT)
- FIPS code: 27-54016
- GNIS feature ID: 0665406

Rice Township is a township in Clearwater County, Minnesota, United States. The population was 162 at the 2020 census. Rice Township was named after the Wild Rice River.

== Geography ==
According to the United States Census Bureau, the township has a total area of 36.0 square miles (93.4 km^{2}), of which 34.9 square miles (90.4 km^{2}) is land and 1.1 square miles (3.0 km^{2}) (3.19%) is water.

== Demographics ==
As of the census of 2000, there were 134 people, 56 households, and 39 families residing in the township. The population density was 3.8 people per square mile (1.5/km^{2}). There were 101 housing units at an average density of 2.9/sq mi (1.1/km^{2}). The racial makeup of the township was 86.57% White, 0.75% African American and 12.69% Native American.

There were 56 households, out of which 26.8% had children under the age of 18 living with them, 60.7% were married couples living together, 7.1% had a female householder with no husband present, and 28.6% were non-families. 26.8% of all households were made up of individuals, and 14.3% had someone living alone who was 65 years of age or older. The average household size was 2.39 and the average family size was 2.90.

In the township the population was spread out, with 23.1% under the age of 18, 9.0% from 18 to 24, 22.4% from 25 to 44, 26.9% from 45 to 64, and 18.7% who were 65 years of age or older. The median age was 43 years. For every 100 females, there were 106.2 males. For every 100 females age 18 and over, there were 106.0 males.

The median income for a household in the township was $19,583, and the median income for a family was $27,500. Males had a median income of $16,875 versus $14,375 for females. The per capita income for the township was $10,349. There were 22.9% of families and 34.2% of the population living below the poverty line, including 63.2% of under eighteens and 18.2% of those over 64.
