= Mallard Lake (Clearwater County, Minnesota) =

Lake in the state of Minnesota, United States

- Location within Minnesota
- Location: Clearwater County, Minnesota
- Coordinates: 47°18′8″N 95°16′0″W
- Type: lake

Mallard Lake is a 104 acre lake in Clearwater County, Minnesota, in the United States.

Mallard Lake was named from its large population of mallard ducks. The lake has a reported maximum depth of 17 feet.

== See also ==
- List of lakes in Minnesota
