= Minerva Township, Clearwater County, Minnesota =

Township in Minnesota, United States

Minerva Township
- Township
- Location of Minerva Township, within Clearwater County, Minnesota
- Coordinates: 47°21′53″N 95°22′43″W
- Country: United States
- State: Minnesota
- County: Clearwater

Area
  - Total: 36.1 sq mi (93.6 km^{2})
  - Land: 34.5 sq mi (89.4 km^{2})
  - Water: 1.6 sq mi (4.2 km^{2})
- Elevation: 1,506 ft (459 m)

Population (2020)
  - Total: 239
  - Density: 6.92/sq mi (2.67/km^{2})
- Time zone: UTC-6 (Central (CST))
  - Summer (DST): UTC-5 (CDT)
- ZIP code: 56621
- Area code: 218
- FIPS code: 27-42452
- GNIS feature ID: 0664985

Minerva Township is a township in Clearwater County, Minnesota, United States. The population was 239 at the 2020 census.

Minerva Township was named for Minerva, the Roman goddess of wisdom.

== Geography ==
According to the United States Census Bureau, the township has a total area of 36.1 square miles (93.6 km^{2}), of which 34.5 square miles (89.4 km^{2}) is land and 1.6 square miles (4.2 km^{2}) (4.48%) is water.

== Demographics ==
As of the census of 2000, there were 283 people, 97 households, and 76 families residing in the township. The population density was 8.2 people per square mile (3.2/km^{2}). There were 120 housing units at an average density of 3.5/sq mi (1.3/km^{2}). The racial makeup of the township was 92.93% White, 3.89% Native American, 1.06% Asian, and 2.12% from two or more races. Hispanic or Latino of any race were 0.71% of the population.

There were 97 households, out of which 38.1% had children under the age of 18 living with them, 67.0% were married couples living together, 6.2% had a female householder with no husband present, and 21.6% were non-families. 14.4% of all households were made up of individuals, and 4.1% had someone living alone who was 65 years of age or older. The average household size was 2.92 and the average family size was 3.28.

In the township the population was spread out, with 29.7% under the age of 18, 9.2% from 18 to 24, 25.4% from 25 to 44, 22.6% from 45 to 64, and 13.1% who were 65 years of age or older. The median age was 32 years. For every 100 females, there were 109.6 males. For every 100 females age 18 and over, there were 105.2 males.

The median income for a household in the township was $39,167, and the median income for a family was $43,125. Males had a median income of $38,125 versus $22,083 for females. The per capita income for the township was $15,561. About 14.1% of families and 17.6% of the population were below the poverty line, including 28.9% of those under the age of eighteen and none of those 65 or over.
