= Dudley Township, Clearwater County, Minnesota =

Township in Minnesota, United States

Dudley Township
- Township
- Location of Dudley Township, within Clearwater County, Minnesota
- Coordinates: 47°38′19″N 95°15′32″W
- Country: United States
- State: Minnesota
- County: Clearwater

Area
  - Total: 31.3 sq mi (81.1 km^{2})
  - Land: 29.7 sq mi (76.8 km^{2})
  - Water: 1.7 sq mi (4.3 km^{2})
- Elevation: 1,430 ft (436 m)

Population (2020)
  - Total: 420
  - Density: 14/sq mi (5.5/km^{2})
- Time zone: UTC-6 (Central (CST))
  - Summer (DST): UTC-5 (CDT)
- ZIP code: 56652
- Area code: 218
- FIPS code: 27-16462
- GNIS feature ID: 0664004

Dudley Township is a township in Clearwater County, Minnesota, in the United States. At the 2020 census, the township population was 420.

Dudley Township was named for Frank E. Dudley, a county commissioner.

== History ==
Voters met and signed a petition in 1899 asking that Township 148, Range 36 be organized as a township under the laws of the state of Minnesota. The laws were followed to the Beltrami County Board's satisfaction and it was ordered that the first election be held on Friday, May 19, 1899, at the home of William McCrehin and further ordered that the township be named Dudley.

== Geography ==
According to the United States Census Bureau, the township has a total area of 31.3 square miles (81 km^{2}), of which 29.6 square miles (77 km^{2}) is land and 1.7 square miles (4.4 km^{2}) (5.30%) is water.

== Demographics ==
Atf the 2000 census, there were 365 people, 123 households and 97 families residing in the township. The population density was 12.3 per square mile (4.7/km^{2}). There were 133 housing units at an average density of 4.5 per square mile (1.7/km^{2}). The racial make-up of the township was 98.90% White, 0.27% Pacific Islander and 0.82% from two or more races. Hispanic or Latino of any race were 0.27% of the population.

There were 123 households, of which 44.7% had children under the age of 18 living with them, 68.3% were married couples living together, 4.9% had a female householder with no husband present and 21.1% were non-families. 19.5% of all households were made up of individuals and 8.9% had someone living alone who was 65 years of age or older. The average household size was 2.97 and the average family size was 3.41.

33.2% of the population were under the age of 18, 6.3% from 18 to 24, 28.5% from 25 to 44, 21.9% from 45 to 64 and 10.1% were 65 years of age or older. The median age was 34 years. For every 100 females, there were 123.9 males. For every 100 females age 18 and over, there were 114.0 males.

The median household income was $32,813 and the median family income was $37,188. Males had a median income of $31,944 and females $17,000. The per capita income was $12,049. About 12.9% of families and 18.5% of the population were below the poverty line, including 24.4% of those under age 18 and 26.3% of those age 65 or over.
