= Hendrickson Township, Hubbard County, Minnesota =

Hendrickson Township, Minnesota
- Township
- Location of Hendrickson Township, within Hubbard County, Minnesota
- Coordinates: 47°12′34″N 94°49′33″W
- Country: United States
- State: Minnesota
- County: Hubbard

Area
  - Total: 35.8 sq mi (92.7 km^{2})
  - Land: 35.0 sq mi (90.7 km^{2})
  - Water: 0.77 sq mi (2.0 km^{2})
- Elevation: 1,417 ft (432 m)

Population (2020)
  - Total: 307
  - Density: 8.77/sq mi (3.38/km^{2})
- Time zone: UTC-6 (Central (CST))
  - Summer (DST): UTC-5 (CDT)
- FIPS code: 27-28466
- GNIS feature ID: 0664450

Hendrickson Township is a township in Hubbard County, Minnesota, United States. The population was 307 at the 2020 census.

Hendrickson Township was named for John C. Hendrickson, the owner of a local sawmill.

== Geography ==
According to the United States Census Bureau, the township has a total area of 35.8 square miles (93 km^{2}), of which 35.0 square miles (91 km^{2}) is land and 0.8 square miles (2.1 km^{2}) is water. The total area is 2.18% water.

Minnesota Highway 64 and Minnesota Highway 200 are two of the main routes in the community.

== Demographics ==
As of the census of 2000, there were 229 people, 90 households, and 68 families residing in the township. The population density was 6.5 inhabitants per square mile (2.5/km^{2}). There were 117 housing units at an average density of 3.3 per square mile (1.3/km^{2}). The racial makeup of the township was 98.25% White, 0.44% Native American, and 1.31% from two or more races. Hispanic or Latino of any race were 0.87% of the population.

There were 90 households, out of which 31.1% had children under the age of 18 living with them, 68.9% were married couples living together, 5.6% had a female householder with no husband present, and 24.4% were non-families. 22.2% of all households were made up of individuals, and 7.8% had someone living alone who was 65 years of age or older. The average household size was 2.54 and the average family size was 2.96.

In the township the population was spread out, with 26.6% under the age of 18, 4.4% from 18 to 24, 27.9% from 25 to 44, 27.1% from 45 to 64, and 14.0% who were 65 years of age or older. The median age was 40 years. For every 100 females, there were 100.9 males. For every 100 females age 18 and over, there were 102.4 males.

The median income for a household in the township was $40,000, and the median income for a family was $40,750. Males had a median income of $35,208 versus $20,000 for females. The per capita income for the township was $15,309. About 2.6% of families and 5.0% of the population were below the poverty line, including 2.9% of those under the age of eighteen and 15.4% of those 65 or over.
