= Leon Township, Clearwater County, Minnesota =

Township in Minnesota, United States

Leon Township
- Township
- Location of Leon Township, within Clearwater County, Minnesota
- Coordinates: 47°42′35″N 95°23′55″W
- Country: United States
- State: Minnesota
- County: Clearwater

Area
  - Total: 35.8 sq mi (92.6 km^{2})
  - Land: 35.4 sq mi (91.6 km^{2})
  - Water: 0.35 sq mi (0.9 km^{2})
- Elevation: 1,293 ft (394 m)

Population (2020)
  - Total: 392
  - Density: 11.1/sq mi (4.28/km^{2})
- Time zone: UTC-6 (Central (CST))
  - Summer (DST): UTC-5 (CDT)
- ZIP code: 56634
- Area code: 218
- FIPS code: 27-36458
- GNIS feature ID: 0664754

Leon Township is a township in Clearwater County, Minnesota, United States. The population was 392 at the 2020 census.

== History ==
Leon Township was organized in 1897. The township was named for Leon Dickinson, the first white birth within its borders.

== Geography ==
According to the United States Census Bureau, the township has a total area of 35.8 mi^{2} (92.6 km^{2}), of which 35.4 mi^{2} (91.6 km^{2}) is land and 0.4 mi^{2} (1.0 km^{2}) (1.03%) is water.

== Demographics ==
As of the census of 2000, there were 345 people, 135 households, and 98 families residing in the township. The population density was 9.8 inhabitants per square mile (3.8/km^{2}). There were 148 housing units at an average density of 4.2 per square mile (1.6/km^{2}). The racial makeup of the township was 98.26% White and 1.74% Native American. Hispanic or Latino of any race were 0.87% of the population.

There were 135 households, out of which 31.9% had children under the age of 18 living with them, 65.9% were married couples living together, 5.2% had a female householder with no husband present, and 26.7% were non-families. 25.2% of all households were made up of individuals, and 14.1% had someone living alone who was 65 years of age or older. The average household size was 2.56 and the average family size was 3.08.

In the township the population was spread out, with 28.1% under the age of 18, 5.5% from 18 to 24, 24.9% from 25 to 44, 23.5% from 45 to 64, and 18.0% who were 65 years of age or older. The median age was 40 years. For every 100 females, there were 98.3 males. For every 100 females age 18 and over, there were 90.8 males.

The median income for a household in the township was $31,250, and the median income for a family was $39,583. Males had a median income of $32,250 versus $20,000 for females. The per capita income for the township was $15,669. About 2.0% of families and 8.5% of the population were below the poverty line, including none of those under age 18 and 21.4% of those age 65 or over.
