= Leonard, Minnesota =

City in Minnesota, United States

- City
- Location of Leonard, Minnesota
- Coordinates: 47°39′9″N 95°16′9″W
- Country: United States
- State: Minnesota
- County: Clearwater
- Founded: 1899
- Incorporated: June 12, 1922

Government
  - Mayor: Chelsea Erickson

Area
  - Total: 0.463 sq mi (1.198 km^{2})
  - Land: 0.463 sq mi (1.198 km^{2})
  - Water: 0 sq mi (0.000 km^{2})
- Elevation: 1,453 ft (443 m)

Population (2020)
  - Total: 41
  - Estimate (2022): 45
  - Density: 88.6/sq mi (34.21/km^{2})
- Time zone: UTC−6 (Central (CST))
  - Summer (DST): UTC−5 (CDT)
- ZIP Code: 56652
- Area code: 218
- FIPS code: 27-36494
- GNIS feature ID: 0646604
- Sales tax: 6.875%

Leonard is a city in Clearwater County, Minnesota, United States. The population was 41 at the 2020 census.

== History ==
A post office called Leonard was established in 1899, and remained in operation until it was discontinued in 1991. The city was named for Leonard French, the son of a pioneer merchant.

== Geography ==
According to the United States Census Bureau, the city has a total area of 0.463 square miles (1.20 km^{2}), all land.

Leonard is along State Highway 223 (MN 223) and County Roads 2, 10, 14, and 23.

== Demographics ==
Historical population
Census	Pop.	Note	%±
1930	109		—
1940	111		1.8%
1950	88		−20.7%
1960	70		−20.5%
1970	54		−22.9%
1980	50		−7.4%
1990	26		−48.0%
2000	29		11.5%
2010	41		41.4%
2020	41		0.0%
2022 (est.)	45		9.8%
U.S. Decennial Census; 2020 Census

=== 2010 census ===
As of the 2010 census, there were 41 people, 19 households, and 12 families living in the city. The population density was 93.2 inhabitants per square mile (36.0/km^{2}). There were 21 housing units at an average density of 47.7 per square mile (18.4/km^{2}). The racial makeup of the city was 100.0% White.

There were 19 households, of which 31.6% had children under the age of 18 living with them, 47.4% were married couples living together, 15.8% had a female householder with no husband present, and 36.8% were non-families. 36.8% of all households were made up of individuals, and 15.8% had someone living alone who was 65 years of age or older. The average household size was 2.16 and the average family size was 2.83.

The median age in the city was 39.5 years. 24.4% of residents were under the age of 18; 7.3% were between the ages of 18 and 24; 34.1% were from 25 to 44; 14.7% were from 45 to 64; and 19.5% were 65 years of age or older. The gender makeup of the city was 48.8% male and 51.2% female.

=== 2000 census ===
As of the 2000 census, there were 29 people, 17 households, and 8 families living in the city. The population density was 64.0 inhabitants per square mile (24.7/km^{2}). There were 19 housing units at an average density of 42.0 per square mile (16.2/km^{2}). The racial makeup of the city was 100.00% White.

There were 17 households, out of which 5.9% had children under the age of 18 living with them, 41.2% were married couples living together, and 52.9% were non-families. 52.9% of all households were made up of individuals, and 35.3% had someone living alone who was 65 years of age or older. The average household size was 1.71 and the average family size was 2.50.

In the city, the population was spread out, with 6.9% under the age of 18, 6.9% from 18 to 24, 31.0% from 25 to 44, 10.3% from 45 to 64, and 44.8% who were 65 years of age or older. The median age was 62 years. For every 100 females, there were 93.3 males. For every 100 females age 18 and over, there were 107.7 males.

The median income for a household in the city was $31,250, and the median income for a family was $43,750. Males had a median income of $0 versus $23,750 for females. The per capita income for the city was $17,005. There were no families and 7.7% of the population living below the poverty line, including no under eighteens and none of those over 64.

== History ==
Leonard was incorporated as a village in 1922. The first head of the village council was Nels Strand and the trustees were David Payne, Carl Erickson, and Maurice Johnson. C. O. (Oscar) Lundmark was the city clerk. August Stenlund and John Carlson were justices of the peace and Henry Hagen and Ferd Isackson were the first constables.
