= Peterson Lake (Meeker County, Minnesota) =

Lake in the state of Minnesota, United States

- Location within Minnesota
- Location: Meeker County, Minnesota
- Coordinates: 45°10′30″N 94°43′31″W
- Type: lake

Peterson Lake is a lake in Meeker County, in the U.S. state of Minnesota.

Peterson Lake was named for Hans Peterson, a pioneer who settled there.

== See also ==
- List of lakes in Minnesota
