= Lambert Township, Red Lake County, Minnesota =

Lambert Township, Minnesota
- Township
- Location of Lambert Township, within Red Lake County, Minnesota
- Coordinates: 47°49′8″N 95°53′35″W
- Country: United States
- State: Minnesota
- County: Red Lake

Area
  - Total: 35.7 sq mi (92.4 km^{2})
  - Land: 35.7 sq mi (92.4 km^{2})
  - Water: 0 sq mi (0.0 km^{2})
- Elevation: 1,155 ft (352 m)

Population (2020)
  - Total: 136
  - Density: 3.81/sq mi (1.47/km^{2})
- Time zone: UTC-6 (Central (CST))
  - Summer (DST): UTC-5 (CDT)
- FIPS code: 27-35270
- GNIS feature ID: 0664714

Lambert Township is a township in Red Lake County, Minnesota, United States. The population was 136 at the 2020 census.

Lambert Township bears the name of Francois Lambert, a county official.

== Geography ==
According to the United States Census Bureau, the township has a total area of 35.7 square miles (92 km^{2}), all land.

== Demographics ==
As of the census of 2000, there were 154 people, 64 households, and 44 families residing in the township. The population density was 4.3 inhabitants per square mile (1.7/km^{2}). There were 69 housing units at an average density of 1.9 per square mile (0.73/km^{2}). The racial makeup of the township was 100.00% White.

There were 64 households, out of which 18.8% had children under the age of 18 living with them, 60.9% were married couples living together, 3.1% had a female householder with no husband present, and 29.7% were non-families. 23.4% of all households were made up of individuals, and 12.5% had someone living alone who was 65 years of age or older. The average household size was 2.41 and the average family size was 2.80.

In the township the population was spread out, with 18.8% under the age of 18, 8.4% from 18 to 24, 23.4% from 25 to 44, 35.1% from 45 to 64, and 14.3% who were 65 years of age or older. The median age was 44 years. For every 100 females, there were 126.5 males. For every 100 females age 18 and over, there were 135.8 males.

The median income for a household in the township was $33,750, and the median income for a family was $35,000. Males had a median income of $26,250 versus $20,781 for females. The per capita income for the township was $15,888. None of the families and 1.4% of the population were living below the poverty line.
