= Holst Township, Clearwater County, Minnesota =

Township in Minnesota, United States

Holst Township
- Township
- Location of Holst Township, within Clearwater County, Minnesota
- Coordinates: 47°37′24″N 95°22′24″W
- Country: United States
- State: Minnesota
- County: Clearwater

Area
  - Total: 35.6 sq mi (92.2 km^{2})
  - Land: 35.1 sq mi (91.0 km^{2})
  - Water: 0.46 sq mi (1.2 km^{2})
- Elevation: 1,539 ft (469 m)

Population (2020)
  - Total: 335
  - Density: 9.53/sq mi (3.68/km^{2})
- Time zone: UTC-6 (Central (CST))
  - Summer (DST): UTC-5 (CDT)
- ZIP code: 56652
- Area code: 218
- FIPS code: 27-29834
- GNIS feature ID: 0664505

Holst Township is a township in Clearwater County, Minnesota, United States. The population was 335 at the 2020 census.

== History ==
Holst Township was originally called Silver Creek Township, and under the latter name was organized in 1899. The present name honors H. J. Hoist, who from 1904 to 1908 was the county sheriff.

== Geography ==
According to the United States Census Bureau, the township has a total area of 35.6 square miles (92 km^{2}), of which 35.1 square miles (91 km^{2}) is land and 0.5 square miles (1.3 km^{2}) (1.35%) is water.

== Demographics ==
At the 2000 census, there were 316 people, 130 households and 92 families residing in the township. The population density was 9.0 per square mile (3.5/km^{2}). There were 151 housing units at an average density of 4.3/sq mi (1.7/km^{2}). The racial makeup of the township was 99.37% White and 0.63% Native American.

There were 130 households, of which 26.9% had children under the age of 18 living with them, 62.3% were married couples living together, 2.3% had a female householder with no husband present, and 29.2% were non-families. 25.4% of all households were made up of individuals, and 9.2% had someone living alone who was 65 years of age or older. The average household size was 2.43 and the average family size was 2.90.

24.4% of the population were under the age of 18, 5.7% from 18 to 24, 25.0% from 25 to 44, 31.0% from 45 to 64, and 13.9% who were 65 years of age or older. The median age was 41 years. For every 100 females, there were 116.4 males. For every 100 females age 18 and over, there were 113.4 males.

The median household income was $35,313 and the median family income was $41,125. Males had a median income of $22,500 versus $19,643 for females. The per capita income for the township was $17,427. About 2.5% of families and 3.3% of the population were below the poverty line, including none of those under age 18 and 7.5% of those age 65 or over.
