= Itasca Township, Clearwater County, Minnesota =

Township in Minnesota, United States

Itasca Township
- Township
- Location of Itasca Township, within Clearwater County, Minnesota
- Coordinates: 47°17′7″N 95°14′28″W
- Country: United States
- State: Minnesota
- County: Clearwater

Area
  - Total: 35.9 sq mi (92.9 km^{2})
  - Land: 34.4 sq mi (89.0 km^{2})
  - Water: 1.5 sq mi (3.8 km^{2})
- Elevation: 1,510 ft (460 m)

Population (2020)
  - Total: 129
  - Density: 3.75/sq mi (1.45/km^{2})
- Time zone: UTC-6 (Central (CST))
  - Summer (DST): UTC-5 (CDT)
- FIPS code: 27-31508
- GNIS feature ID: 0664566

Itasca Township is a township in Clearwater County, Minnesota, United States. The population was 129 at the 2020 census.

== History ==
Itasca Township was organized in 1897. The township took its name from Lake Itasca.

== Geography ==
According to the United States Census Bureau, the township has a total area of 35.8 square miles (93 km^{2}), of which 34.4 square miles (89 km^{2}) is land and 1.5 square miles (3.9 km^{2}) (4.13%) is water.

== Demographics ==
As of the census of 2000, there were 136 people, 56 households, and 42 families residing in the township. The population density was 4.0 inhabitants per square mile (1.5/km^{2}). There were 117 housing units at an average density of 3.4 per square mile (1.3/km^{2}). The racial makeup of the township was 91.18% White, 1.47% African American, 2.21% Native American, 1.47% Asian, 0.74% from other races, and 2.94% from two or more races. Hispanic or Latino of any race were 0.74% of the population.

There were 56 households, out of which 25.0% had children under the age of 18 living with them, 71.4% were married couples living together, 1.8% had a female householder with no husband present, and 25.0% were non-families. 19.6% of all households were made up of individuals, and 10.7% had someone living alone who was 65 years of age or older. The average household size was 2.43 and the average family size was 2.76.

In the township the population was spread out, with 21.3% under the age of 18, 6.6% from 18 to 24, 26.5% from 25 to 44, 32.4% from 45 to 64, and 13.2% who were 65 years of age or older. The median age was 42 years. For every 100 females, there were 106.1 males. For every 100 females age 18 and over, there were 118.4 males.

The median income for a household in the township was $28,750, and the median income for a family was $41,250. Males had a median income of $31,875 versus $24,375 for females. The per capita income for the township was $14,296. There were 5.3% of families and 8.7% of the population living below the poverty line, including no under eighteens and 8.3% of those over 64.
