= Clearwater County, Minnesota =

County in Minnesota, United States

- County
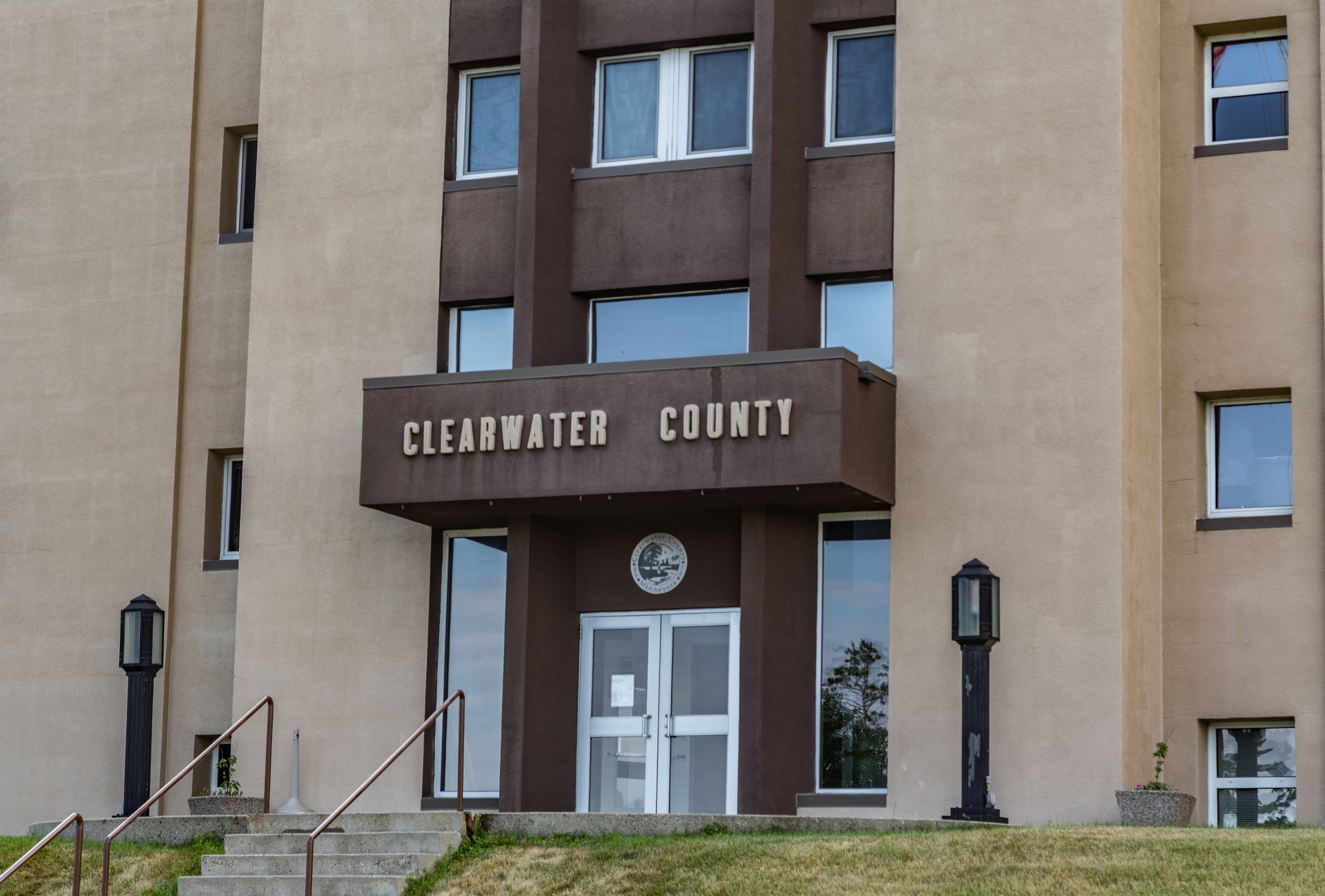
- Clearwater County Building and Courthouse in Bagley, Minnesota.

- Location within the U.S. state of Minnesota
- Coordinates: 47°34′N 95°23′W
- Country: United States
- State: Minnesota
- Founded: December 20, 1902
- Named for: Clearwater Lake; Clearwater River
- Seat: Bagley
- Largest city: Bagley

Area
  - Total: 1,030 sq mi (2,700 km^{2})
  - Land: 999 sq mi (2,590 km^{2})
  - Water: 31 sq mi (80 km^{2}) 3.0%

Population (2020)
  - Total: 8,524
  - Estimate (2025): 8,647 ▲
  - Density: 8.5/sq mi (3.3/km^{2})
- Time zone: UTC−6 (Central)
  - Summer (DST): UTC−5 (CDT)
- Congressional district: 8th
- Website: clearwatercountymn.gov

Clearwater County is a county in the northwestern part of the U.S. state of Minnesota. As of the 2020 census, the population was 8,524. Its county seat is Bagley.

Clearwater County is home to Lake Itasca, the source of the Mississippi River. Parts of the Red Lake and White Earth Indian reservations extend into the county.

== Geography ==
The Red Lake River flows west out of Red Lake across the top of Clearwater County on its way to discharge into the Red River at Grand Forks, North Dakota. The Clearwater River flows west-southwest across the central part of the county on its way to discharge into the Red Lake River. The county terrain consists of wooded rolling hills, dotted with lakes and ponds. The terrain slopes to the north, with the highest point on the lower west boundary, at 1,781 ft (543 m) ASL. The county has an area of 1,030 square miles (2,700 km^{2}), of which 999 square miles (2,590 km^{2}) is land and 31 square miles (80 km^{2}) (3.0%) is water.

Soils of Clearwater County

The county's high point, just south of Scoop Lake, is one of a few places to exceed 2000 feet in Minnesota, rising to 2005 feet at 47.2318°N, -95.5034°W.

=== Major highways ===
- U.S. Highway 2
- Minnesota State Highway 1
- Minnesota State Highway 92
- Minnesota State Highway 113
- Minnesota State Highway 200
- Minnesota State Highway 223

=== Adjacent counties ===
- Beltrami County - northeast
- Hubbard County - southeast
- Becker County - south
- Mahnomen County - southwest
- Polk County - west
- Pennington County - northwest

=== Protected areas ===
- Bagley Lake State Wildlife Management Area
- Clearwater State Wildlife Management Area
- Iron Springs Bog SNA
- Itasca State Park (part)
- Jackson Lake State Wildlife Management Area
- Little Pine State Wildlife Management Area
- Lower Rice Lake State Wildlife Management Area
- Old Red Lake Trail State Wildlife Management Area
- Upper Rice Lake State Wildlife Management Area

== Climate and weather ==
Bagley, Minnesota

Climate chart (precipitation, max. and min. temperature)
J	F	M	A	M	J	J	A	S	O	N	D
0.7 16 −5	0.7 22 0	0.9 35 14	1.6 53 29	3 66 42	4.6 74 51	3.9 79 55	3.2 78 52	2.9 68 43	2.4 54 32	1 35 18	0.6 21 2
- █ Average max. and min. temperatures in °F
- █ Precipitation totals in inches
- Source: The Weather Channel
Metric conversion
J	F	M	A	M	J	J	A	S	O	N	D
18 −9 −21	17 −6 −18	23 2 −10	41 12 −2	76 19 6	117 23 11	100 26 13	82 26 11	73 20 6	61 12 0	24 2 −8	16 −6 −17
- █ Average max. and min. temperatures in °C
- █ Precipitation totals in mm

In recent years average temperatures in Bagley have ranged from a low of −15 °F (−26 °C) in January to a high of 85 °F (29 °C) in July, with a record low of −53 °F (−47 °C) recorded in February 1996 and a record high of 103 °F (39 °C) recorded in August 1976. Average monthly precipitation ranged from 0.64 inches (16 mm) in December to 4.62 inches (117 mm) in June.

== Demographics ==
Historical population
Census	Pop.	Note	%±
1910	6,870		—
1920	8,569		24.7%
1930	9,546		11.4%
1940	11,153		16.8%
1950	10,204		−8.5%
1960	8,864		−13.1%
1970	8,013		−9.6%
1980	8,761		9.3%
1990	8,309		−5.2%
2000	8,423		1.4%
2010	8,695		3.2%
2020	8,524		−2.0%
2025 (est.)	8,647	▲	1.4%
U.S. Decennial Census; 1790-1960 1900-1990; 1990-2000 2010-2020

=== Racial and ethnic composition ===
Clearwater County, Minnesota – Racial and ethnic composition Note: the US Census treats Hispanic/Latino as an ethnic category. This table excludes Latinos from the racial categories and assigns them to a separate category. Hispanics/Latinos may be of any race.
Race / Ethnicity (NH = Non-Hispanic)	Pop 1980	Pop 1990	Pop 2000	Pop 2010	Pop 2020	% 1980	% 1990	% 2000	% 2010	% 2020
White alone (NH)	8,107	7,653	7,507	7,537	7,151	92.54%	92.10%	89.13%	86.68%	83.89%
Black or African American alone (NH)	2	2	16	30	19	0.02%	0.02%	0.19%	0.35%	0.22%
Native American or Alaska Native alone (NH)	627	628	704	752	752	7.16%	7.56%	8.36%	8.65%	8.82%
Asian alone (NH)	7	10	21	21	23	0.08%	0.12%	0.25%	0.24%	0.27%
Native Hawaiian or Pacific Islander alone (NH)	x	x	0	1	2	x	x	0.00%	0.01%	0.02%
Other race alone (NH)	2	0	0	1	22	0.02%	0.00%	0.00%	0.01%	0.26%
Mixed race or Multiracial (NH)	x	x	110	233	454	x	x	1.31%	2.68%	5.33%
Hispanic or Latino (any race)	16	16	65	120	101	0.18%	0.19%	0.77%	1.38%	1.18%
Total	8,761	8,309	8,423	8,695	8,524	100.00%	100.00%	100.00%	100.00%	100.00%

=== 2020 census ===
As of the 2020 census, the county had a population of 8,524. The median age was 42.3 years. 24.7% of residents were under the age of 18 and 21.4% of residents were 65 years of age or older. For every 100 females there were 102.2 males, and for every 100 females age 18 and over there were 100.1 males age 18 and over.

The racial makeup of the county was 84.4% White, 0.3% Black or African American, 8.9% American Indian and Alaska Native, 0.3% Asian, <0.1% Native Hawaiian and Pacific Islander, 0.4% from some other race, and 5.7% from two or more races. Hispanic or Latino residents of any race comprised 1.2% of the population.

<0.1% of residents lived in urban areas, while 100.0% lived in rural areas.

There were 3,487 households in the county, of which 27.6% had children under the age of 18 living in them. Of all households, 50.2% were married-couple households, 20.0% were households with a male householder and no spouse or partner present, and 23.8% were households with a female householder and no spouse or partner present. About 30.7% of all households were made up of individuals and 15.1% had someone living alone who was 65 years of age or older.

There were 4,448 housing units, of which 21.6% were vacant. Among occupied housing units, 79.9% were owner-occupied and 20.1% were renter-occupied. The homeowner vacancy rate was 1.2% and the rental vacancy rate was 5.6%.

=== 2000 census ===
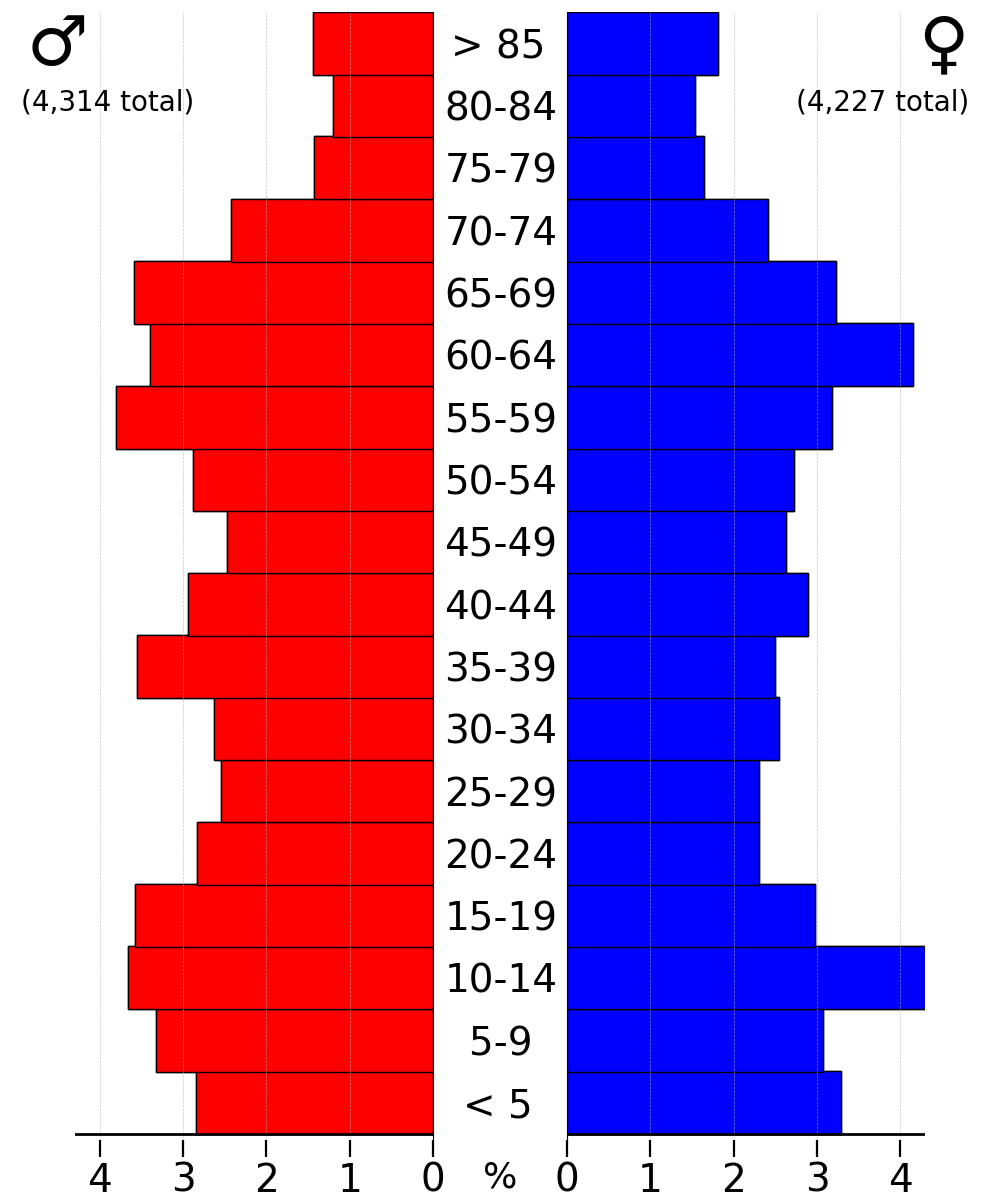
2022 US Census population pyramid for Clearwater County, from ACS 5-year estimates

As of the census of 2000, there were 8,423 people, 3,330 households, and 2,287 families in the county. The population density was 8.43 per square mile (3.25/km^{2}). There were 4,114 housing units at an average density of 4.12 per square mile (1.59/km^{2}). The racial makeup of the county was 89.26% White, 0.19% Black or African American, 8.58% Native American, 0.25% Asian, 0.01% Pacific Islander, 0.24% from other races, and 1.47% from two or more races. 0.77% of the population were Hispanic or Latino of any race. 43.6% were of Norwegian, 15.6% German, 6.5% Swedish, and 6.2% American ancestry.

There were 3,330 households, out of which 30.60% had children under the age of 18 living with them, 56.80% were married couples living together, 7.50% had a female householder with no husband present, and 31.30% were non-families. 27.90% of all households were made up of individuals, and 14.50% had someone living alone who was 65 years of age or older. The average household size was 2.48 and the average family size was 3.02.

The county population contained 26.00% under the age of 18, 7.60% from 18 to 24, 24.60% from 25 to 44, 24.30% from 45 to 64, and 17.50% who were 65 years of age or older. The median age was 40 years. For every 100 females there were 101.10 males. For every 100 females age 18 and over, there were 100.30 males.

The median income for a household in the county was $30,517, and the median income for a family was $39,698. Males had a median income of $29,338 versus $20,417 for females. The per capita income for the county was $15,694. About 11.00% of families and 15.10% of the population were below the poverty line, including 18.90% of those under age 18 and 18.20% of those age 65 or over.

== Communities ==
=== Cities ===
- Bagley (county seat)
- Clearbrook
- Gonvick
- Leonard
- Shevlin

=== Census-designated places ===
- Ebro
- Elbow Lake
- Rice Lake
- Roy Lake
- South End

=== Unincorporated communities ===
- Alida
- Big Bear Landing
- Bonga Landing
- Bush Landing
- Lake Itasca
- Mallard
- Ponsford Landing
- Vern
- Weme
- Zerkel

Townships and unorganized territories of Clearwater County

=== Townships ===
- Bear Creek Township
- Clover Township
- Copley Township
- Dudley Township
- Eddy Township
- Falk Township
- Greenwood Township
- Hangaard Township
- Holst Township
- Itasca Township
- La Prairie Township
- Leon Township
- Long Lost Lake Township
- Minerva Township
- Moose Creek Township
- Nora Township
- Pine Lake Township
- Popple Township
- Rice Township
- Shevlin Township
- Sinclair Township
- Winsor Township

=== Unorganized territories ===
- North Clearwater
- South Clearwater

== Government and politics ==
From 1932 to 1996, Clearwater County voted for the Democratic nominee all but twice, both during nationwide Republican landslides for Richard Nixon in 1972 and Ronald Reagan in 1984. Though the county went Democratic in the subsequent three elections, Reagan's victory foreshadowed the changing political landscape of Clearwater County, as the margins for Michael Dukakis and Bill Clinton were much reduced compared to the prior decades, with Dukakis winning the county by only 6 votes in 1988 and Clinton winning by less than 7.5% in both of his successful runs for the presidency. Beginning in 2000, Clearwater County has voted Republican in each election, and the only time the margin got under 10% was in 2008. In 2016, Donald Trump became the first Republican to win over 60% of the county's vote since 1928, defeating Hillary Clinton by an astounding 43%. In 2020, Trump increased his vote share again, defeating Joe Biden in the county by 45%, and in 2024 improved yet again, defeating Kamala Harris by almost a 50% margin of victory. It was the best Republican performance in the county's history outside of its inaugural election in 1904 for Theodore Roosevelt.

United States presidential election results for Clearwater County, Minnesota
Year	Republican		Democratic		Third party(ies)	
Year	No.	%	No.	%	No.	%
1904	903	85.27%	79	7.46%	77	7.27%
1908	779	66.07%	164	13.91%	236	20.02%
1912	125	11.42%	123	11.23%	847	77.35%
1916	493	39.92%	544	44.05%	198	16.03%
1920	1,788	70.73%	340	13.45%	400	15.82%
1924	1,020	37.54%	86	3.17%	1,611	59.29%
1928	1,898	60.01%	1,189	37.59%	76	2.40%
1932	845	22.89%	2,688	72.81%	159	4.31%
1936	939	22.05%	3,208	75.34%	111	2.61%
1940	1,354	28.94%	3,289	70.31%	35	0.75%
1944	1,125	29.47%	2,658	69.64%	34	0.89%
1948	1,171	27.80%	2,793	66.31%	248	5.89%
1952	1,971	47.89%	2,089	50.75%	56	1.36%
1956	1,464	40.11%	2,171	59.48%	15	0.41%
1960	1,651	39.93%	2,466	59.64%	18	0.44%
1964	1,137	30.41%	2,596	69.43%	6	0.16%
1968	1,284	36.06%	2,046	57.46%	231	6.49%
1972	1,819	49.39%	1,751	47.54%	113	3.07%
1976	1,374	34.22%	2,437	60.70%	204	5.08%
1980	1,919	46.39%	1,955	47.26%	263	6.36%
1984	2,066	51.33%	1,917	47.63%	42	1.04%
1988	1,763	49.43%	1,769	49.59%	35	0.98%
1992	1,315	34.99%	1,587	42.23%	856	22.78%
1996	1,423	40.50%	1,578	44.91%	513	14.60%
2000	2,137	55.88%	1,466	38.34%	221	5.78%
2004	2,438	55.90%	1,871	42.90%	52	1.19%
2008	2,291	53.77%	1,877	44.05%	93	2.18%
2012	2,359	56.21%	1,753	41.77%	85	2.03%
2016	2,925	68.90%	1,100	25.91%	220	5.18%
2020	3,372	71.62%	1,260	26.76%	76	1.61%
2024	3,575	74.26%	1,169	24.28%	70	1.45%

County Board of Commissioners
Position	Name	District	Next Election
Commissioner	Mark Titera	District 1	2026
Commissioner	Dean Newland	District 2	2024
Commissioner	Stuart Dukek	District 3	2026
Commissioner	John Nelson	District 4	2024
Commissioner	Mark Larson	District 5	2026

State Legislature (2018-2020)
Position	Name	Affiliation	District
Senate	Paul Utke	Republican	District 2
House of Representatives	Matt Grossell	Republican	District 2A
House of Representatives	Steve Green	Republican	District 2B

U.S Congress (2018-2020)
Position	Name	Affiliation	District
House of Representatives	Collin Peterson	Democrat	7th
Senate	Amy Klobuchar	Democrat	N/A
Senate	Tina Smith	Democrat	N/A

== See also ==
- National Register of Historic Places listings in Clearwater County MN
