= List of county roads in Roseau County, Minnesota =

- Standard county road markers

Highway names
- Interstates: Interstate X (I-X)
- US Highways: U.S. Highway X (US X)
- State: Trunk Highway X (MN X or TH X)
- County State-Aid Highways: County State-Aid Highway X (CSAH X)
- County Roads: County Road X (CR X)

System links
- County roads of Minnesota; Roseau County

The following is a list of county-maintained roads in Roseau County, Minnesota, United States. Some of the routes included in this list are also county-state-aid-highways (CSAH.)

== Route list ==
Number	Length (mi)	Length (km)	Southern or western terminus	Northern or eastern terminus	Local names	Formed	Removed	Notes
CSAH 2	—	—	County 7 in Barto Township	County 12 in Moranville Township		—	—	
CSAH 3	—	—	Marshall County line	Minnesota 89 in Dieter Township		—	—	
CSAH 4	—	—	Kittson County line	Dead end in Beaver Township		—	—	
CSAH 5	—	—	Thompson Forest Road in Unorganized Roseau County	Minnesota 11 in Warroad		—	—	
CSAH 6	—	—	Kittson County line	County 3 in Huss Township		—	—	
CSAH 7	—	—	Kittson County 25 in Unorganized Roseau County	County 4 in Greenbush		—	—	
CSAH 8	—	—	County 23 in Lind Township	Minnesota 89 in Palmville Township		—	—	
CSAH 9	—	—	Marshall County line; Beltrami County line	Minnesota 11 in Spruce Township		—	—	
CSAH 10	—	—	County 7 in Soler Township	County 3 in Pohlitz Township		—	—	
CSAH 11	—	—	County 26 in Soler Township	County 10 in Soler Township		—	—	
CSAH 12	—	—	County 9 in Enstrom Township	Lake of the Woods County line		—	—	
CSAH 13	—	—	County 9 in Beaver Township	Dead end in Lake Township		—	—	
CSAH 14	—	—	County 3 in Stokes Township	County 37, County 117 in Soler Township		—	—	
CSAH 15	—	—	County 4 in Grimstad Township	Minnesota 11 in JadisTownship		—	—	
CSAH 16	—	—	330th Street (County 10) in Moose Township	Minnesota 310 in Jadis Township		—	—	
CSAH 17	—	—	Minnesota 11 in Roosevelt	Lake of the Woods County line		—	—	
CSAH 18	—	—	Minnesota 89 in Golden Valley Township	Winner Forest Road (County 19) in Reine Township		—	—	
CSAH 19	—	—	County 9 in Reine Township	Harms Way Avenue (County 18) in Reine Township		—	—	
CSAH 20	—	—	Minnesota 89 in Mickinock Township	County 9 in Mickinock Township		—	—	
CSAH 21	—	—	County 20 in Mickinock Township	County 2 in Malung Township		—	—	
CSAH 22	—	—	Minnesota 32 in Hereim Township	County 3 in Barnett Township		—	—	
CSAH 23	—	—	County 6 in Lind Township	County 7 in Barto Township		—	—	
CSAH 24	—	—	County 28 in Spruce Township	Minnesota 11 in Roseau		—	—	
CSAH 25	—	—	County 8 in Huss Township	County 4 in Barnett Township		—	—	
CSAH 26	—	—	County 7 in Soler Township	Minnesota 11 in Ross Township		—	—	
CSAH 28	—	—	County 2 in Malung Township	Minnesota 310 in Jadis Township		—	—	
CSAH 29	—	—	County 8 in Deer Township	Minnesota 11 in Hereim Township		—	—	
CSAH 31	—	—	County 2 in Malung Township	Minnesota 11 in Spruce Township		—	—	
CSAH 33	—	—	160th Street (County 8) in Grimstad Township	Minnesota 89 in Grimstad Township		—	—	
CSAH 34	—	—	Minnesota 11 in Laona Township	Lake of the Woods County line		—	—	
CSAH 35	—	—	County 12 in Cedarbend Township	Minnesota 11 in Lake Township		—	—	Western Segment
CSAH 35	—	—	County 35 in Lake Township	Minnesota 11, Minnesota 313 in Warroad		—	—	Eastern Segment
CSAH 37	—	—	County 14, County 126 in Stokes Township	County 2 in Stokes Township		—	—	
CSAH 38	—	—	County 3 in Poplar Grove Township	County 8 in Poplar Grove Township		—	—	
CSAH 42	—	—	County 2 in Moranville Township	Minnesota 11 in Roosevelt		—	—	
CSAH 43	—	—	County 2 in Moranville Township	County 12 in Moranville Township		—	—	
CSAH 44	—	—	County 35 in Moranville Township	County 5 in Moranville Township		—	—	
CSAH 45	—	—	County 46 in Lake Township	County 13 in Lake Township		—	—	
CSAH 46	—	—	Minnesota 11 in Lake Township	County 35 in Lake Township		—	—	
CSAH 72	—	—	Minnesota 11 in Roseau	County 24 in Roseau		—	—	
CSAH 73	—	—	Minnesota 11 in Badger	Minnesota 11 in Badger		—	—	
CR 74	—	—	Minnesota 11 in Warroad	Minnesota 313 in Warroad		—	—	
CSAH 77	—	—	9th Street in Roseau	County 72 in Roseau		—	—	
CR 101	—	—	260th Street (County 23) in Polonia Township	270th Street in Polonia Township		—	—	
CR 102	—	—	100th Avenue in Polonia Township	County 7 in Barto Township		—	—	
CR 103	—	—	County 4 in Hereim Township	County 7 in Soler Township		—	—	
CR 104	—	—	120th Avenue in Dewey Township	Minnesota 11 in Hereim Township		—	—	
CR 105	—	—	County 6 in Lind Township	Minnesota 11 in Dewey Township		—	—	
CR 106	—	—	County 105 in Lind Township	County 23 in Lind Township		—	—	Western Segment
CR 106	—	—	County 29 in Deer Township	Minnesota 32 in Deer Township		—	—	Eastern Segment
CR 107	—	—	Marshall County line	County 8 in Lind Township		—	—	
CR 108	—	—	Minnesota 32 in Deer Township	County 3 in Poplar Grove Township		—	—	
CR 109	—	—	County 108 in Huss Township	County 8 in Huss Township		—	—	
CR 111	—	—	County 4 in Barnett Township	County 2 in Skagen Township		—	—	
CR 112	—	—	County 113 in Pohlitz Township	Minnesota 89 in Dieter Township		—	—	
CR 113	—	—	County 10 in Pohlitz Township	Main Dike Road in Pohlitz Township		—	—	
CR 114	—	—	Minnesota 11 in Stokes Township	Minnesota 89 in Stafford Township		—	—	
CR 115	—	—	County 26 in Ross Township	Minnesota 89 in Dieter Township		—	—	
CR 116	—	—	County 3 in Nereson Township	County 117 in Nereson Township		—	—	
CR 117	—	—	180th Street in Nereson Township	County 14, County 126 in Stokes Township		—	—	
CR 118	—	—	Minnesota 89 in Dieter Township	349th Avenue in Unorganized Roseau County		—	—	
CR 119	—	—	County 2 in Stokes Township	Minnesota 11, Minnesota 308 in Ross Township		—	—	
CR 120	—	—	County 72 in Roseau	Minnesota 89 in Jadis Township		—	—	
CR 121	—	—	County 126 in Stafford Township	County 2 in Stafford Township		—	—	
CR 122	—	—	County 125 in Palmville Township	Minnesota 89 in Palmville Township		—	—	
CR 123	—	—	County 16 in Jadis Township	350th Street in Unorganized Roseau County		—	—	
CR 124	—	—	County 28 in Spruce Township	County 13 in Enstrom Township		—	—	
CR 125	—	—	100th Street in Palmville Township	County 8 in Palmville Township		—	—	
CR 126	—	—	County 37, County 117 in Stokes Township	County 12 in Enstrom Township		—	—	
CR 127	—	—	County 4 in Mickinock Township	County 20 in Mickinock Township		—	—	
CR 128	—	—	Minnesota 89 in Mickinock Township	County 9 in Mickinock Township		—	—	
CR 129	—	—	County 126 in Malung Township	Minnesota 11 in Spruce Township		—	—	
CR 130	—	—	County 15 in Grimstad Township	County 33 in Grimstad Township		—	—	
CR 131	—	—	County 18 in Golden Valley Township	Minnesota 89 in Golden Valley Township		—	—	
CR 132	—	—	County 13 in Falun Township	County 126 in Falun Township		—	—	
CR 133	—	—	Minnesota 11 in Enstrom Township	County 13 in Unorganized Roseau County		—	—	
CR 134	—	—	560th Avenue in Cedarbend Township	County 35 in Cedarbend Township		—	—	Western Segment
CR 134	—	—	County 5 in Moranville Township	County 2 in Moranville Township		—	—	Eastern Segment
CR 135	—	—	County 2 in Unorganized Roseau County	County 12 in Cedarbend Township		—	—	
CR 136	—	—	County 5 in Unorganized Roseau County	Ditch 10 Road in Unorganized Roseau County		—	—	
CR 137	—	—	Minnesota 11 in Lake Township	Minnesota 313 in Lake Township		—	—	
CR 138	—	—	County 4 in Beaver Township	County 9 in Beaver Township		—	—	
CR 139	—	—	County 2 in Skagen Township	County 10 in Pohlitz Township		—	—	
CR 140	—	—	Minnesota 11 in Laona Township	County 34 in Laona Township		—	—	
CR 141	—	—	Lake of the Woods County line	Minnesota 11 in Unorganized Roseau County		—	—	
CR 147	—	—	County 12 in Laona Township	Dead end in Laona Township		—	—	
CR 148	—	—	County 3 in Dieter Township	Minnesota 89 in Dieter Township		—	—	
CR 149	—	—	Minnesota 11 in Barto Township	County 26 in Soler Township		—	—	
Former
