= List of townships in Minnesota =

Minnesota townships
- Map of the 1,806 townships in Minnesota, 853 cities, and 87 counties.
- Category: Lower-level administrative division
- Location: Minnesota
- Created by: Land Ordinance of 1785
- Created: May 20, 1785
- Number: 1,806
- Populations: 6 (Hangaard Township) – 11,049 (White Bear Township)
- Areas: 2.9 square miles (7.5 km^{2}) (Rhinehart Township) – 596.3 square miles (1,544 km^{2}) (Angle Township)
- Government: Township government

The U.S. state of Minnesota is divided into 1,806 townships in 87 counties.

Township	County
Aastad	Otter Tail
Acoma	McLeod
Acton	Meeker
Adams	Mower
Adrian	Watonwan
Aetna	Pipestone
Agassiz	Lac qui Parle
Agder	Marshall
Agram	Morrison
Aitkin	Aitkin
Akeley	Hubbard
Akron	Big Stone
Akron	Wilkin
Alango	St. Louis
Alaska	Beltrami
Alba	Jackson
Albany	Stearns
Albert Lea	Freeborn
Alberta	Benton
Albin	Brown
Albion	Wright
Alborn	St. Louis
Alden	Freeborn
Alden	St. Louis
Aldrich	Wadena
Alexandria	Douglas
Alfsborg	Sibley
Alliance	Clay
Alma	Marshall
Almond	Big Stone
Alta Vista	Lincoln
Alton	Waseca
Altona	Pipestone
Alvwood	Itasca
Amador	Chisago
Amboy	Cottonwood
Amherst	Fillmore
Amiret	Lyon
Amo	Cottonwood
Amor	Otter Tail
Andover	Polk
Andrea	Wilkin
Angle	Lake of the Woods
Angora	St. Louis
Angus	Polk
Ann Lake	Kanabec
Ann	Cottonwood
Ansel	Cass
Anthony	Norman
Antrim	Watonwan
Appleton	Swift
Arago	Hubbard
Arbo	Itasca
Arctander	Kandiyohi
Ardenhurst	Itasca
Arena	Lac qui Parle
Arendahl	Fillmore
Arlington	Sibley
Arlone	Pine
Arna	Pine
Arrowhead	St. Louis
Arthur	Kanabec
Arthur	Traverse
Artichoke	Big Stone
Arveson	Kittson
Ash Lake	Lincoln
Ashland	Dodge
Ashley	Stearns
Athens	Isanti
Atherton	Wilkin
Atkinson	Carlton
Atlanta	Becker
Audubon	Becker
Augsburg	Marshall
Augusta	Lac qui Parle
Ault	St. Louis
Aurdal	Otter Tail
Aurora	Steele
Austin	Mower
Automba	Carlton
Avon	Stearns
Badger	Polk
Badoura	Hubbard
Baker	Stevens
Balkan	St. Louis
Ball Bluff	Aitkin
Balsam	Aitkin
Balsam	Itasca
Bancroft	Freeborn
Bandon	Renville
Bangor	Pope
Barber	Faribault
Barclay	Cass
Barnesville	Clay
Barnett	Roseau
Barnum	Carlton
Barry	Pine
Barsness	Pope
Bartlett	Todd
Barto	Roseau
Bashaw	Brown
Bassett	St. Louis
Bath	Freeborn
Battle Plain	Rock
Battle	Beltrami
Baudette	Lake of the Woods
Baxter	Lac qui Parle
Bay Lake	Crow Wing
Baytown	Washington
Bear Creek	Clearwater
Bear Park	Norman
Bearville	Itasca
Beatty	St. Louis
Beauford	Blue Earth
Beaulieu	Mahnomen
Beaver Bay	Lake
Beaver Creek	Rock
Beaver Falls	Renville
Beaver	Aitkin
Beaver	Fillmore
Beaver	Roseau
Becker	Cass
Becker	Sherburne
Bejou	Mahnomen
Belfast	Murray
Belgium	Polk
Belgrade	Nicollet
Belle Creek	Goodhue
Belle Plaine	Scott
Belle Prairie	Morrison
Belle River	Douglas
Bellevue	Morrison
Belmont	Jackson
Belvidere	Goodhue
Bemidji	Beltrami
Ben Wade	Pope
Bennington	Mower
Benson	Swift
Benton	Carver
Benville	Beltrami
Bergen	McLeod
Berlin	Steele
Bernadotte	Nicollet
Bertha	Todd
Beseman	Carlton
Beulah	Cass
Big Bend	Chippewa
Big Lake	Sherburne
Big Stone	Big Stone
Big Woods	Marshall
Bigelow	Nobles
Bigfork	Itasca
Birch Cooley	Renville
Birch Creek	Pine
Birch Lake	Cass
Birch	Beltrami
Birchdale	Todd
Bird Island	Renville
Bismarck	Sibley
Biwabik	St. Louis
Black Hammer	Houston
Black River	Pennington
Blackberry	Itasca
Blackhoof	Carlton
Blakeley	Scott
Blind Lake	Cass
Bloom	Nobles
Bloomer	Marshall
Bloomfield	Fillmore
Blooming Grove	Waseca
Blooming Prairie	Steele
Blowers	Otter Tail
Blue Hill	Sherburne
Blue Mounds	Pope
Blueberry	Wadena
Bluffton	Otter Tail
Bogus Brook	Mille Lacs
Bondin	Murray
Boon Lake	Renville
Boone	Lake of the Woods
Borgholm	Mille Lacs
Bowstring	Itasca
Boxville	Marshall
Boy Lake	Cass
Boy River	Cass
Bradbury	Mille Lacs
Bradford	Isanti
Bradford	Wilkin
Brandon	Douglas
Brandrup	Wilkin
Brandsvold	Polk
Brandt	Polk
Bray	Pennington
Breckenridge	Wilkin
Breitung	St. Louis
Bremen	Pine
Brevator	St. Louis
Bridgewater	Rice
Brighton	Nicollet
Brislet	Polk
Bristol	Fillmore
Brockway	Stearns
Brook Park	Pine
Brookfield	Renville
Brookville	Redwood
Browns Creek	Red Lake
Browns Valley	Big Stone
Brownsville	Houston
Bruce	Todd
Bruno	Pine
Brunswick	Kanabec
Brush Creek	Faribault
Buckman	Morrison
Buffalo	Wright
Buh	Morrison
Bull Moose	Cass
Bullard	Wadena
Bungo	Cass
Burbank	Kandiyohi
Burke	Pipestone
Burleene	Todd
Burlington	Becker
Burnhamville	Todd
Burnstown	Brown
Burton	Yellow Medicine
Buse	Otter Tail
Butler	Otter Tail
Butterfield	Watonwan
Butternut Valley	Blue Earth
Buzzle	Beltrami
Bygland	Polk
Byron	Cass
Byron	Waseca
Cairo	Renville
Caledonia	Houston
Callaway	Becker
Cambria	Blue Earth
Cambridge	Isanti
Camden	Carver
Cameron	Murray
Camp 5	St. Louis
Camp Lake	Swift
Camp Release	Lac qui Parle
Camp	Renville
Campbell	Wilkin
Candor	Otter Tail
Canisteo	Dodge
Cannon City	Rice
Cannon Falls	Goodhue
Cannon	Kittson
Canosia	St. Louis
Canton	Fillmore
Caribou	Kittson
Carimona	Fillmore
Carlisle	Otter Tail
Carlos	Douglas
Carlston	Freeborn
Carpenter	Itasca
Carrolton	Fillmore
Carson	Cottonwood
Carsonville	Becker
Cascade	Olmsted
Cashel	Swift
Castle Rock	Dakota
Cedar Lake	Scott
Cedar Mills	Meeker
Cedar	Marshall
Cedar	Martin
Cedar Valley	St. Louis
Cedarbend	Roseau
Center Creek	Martin
Center	Crow Wing
Ceresco	Blue Earth
Cerro Gordo	Lac qui Parle
Champion	Wilkin
Chanarambie	Murray
Charlestown	Redwood
Chaska	Carver
Chatfield	Fillmore
Chatham	Wright
Chengwatana	Pine
Cherry Grove	Goodhue
Cherry	St. Louis
Chester	Polk
Chester	Wabasha
Chief	Mahnomen
Chilgren	Lake of the Woods
Chippewa Falls	Pope
Chisago Lake	Chisago
Christiania	Jackson
Claremont	Dodge
Clark	Aitkin
Clark	Faribault
Clay	Hubbard
Clayton	Mower
Clear Lake	Sherburne
Clearwater	Wright
Cleveland	Le Sueur
Clifton	Lyon
Clifton	Traverse
Clinton Falls	Steele
Clinton	Rock
Clinton	St. Louis
Clitherall	Otter Tail
Clontarf	Swift
Clover Leaf	Pennington
Clover	Clearwater
Clover	Hubbard
Clover	Mahnomen
Clover	Pine
Clow	Kittson
Cokato	Wright
Colfax	Kandiyohi
Collegeville	Stearns
Collins	McLeod
Collinwood	Meeker
Columbia	Polk
Colvin	St. Louis
Comfort	Kanabec
Como	Marshall
Compton	Otter Tail
Comstock	Marshall
Concord	Dodge
Connelly	Wilkin
Coon Creek	Lyon
Copley	Clearwater
Cordova	Le Sueur
Corinna	Wright
Corliss	Otter Tail
Cormant	Beltrami
Cormorant	Becker
Cornish	Aitkin
Cornish	Sibley
Cosmos	Meeker
Cotton	St. Louis
Cottonwood	Brown
Courtland	Nicollet
Crate	Chippewa
Croke	Traverse
Cromwell	Clay
Crooked Creek	Houston
Crooked Lake	Cass
Crooks	Renville
Crookston	Polk
Crosby	Pine
Crow Lake	Stearns
Crow River	Stearns
Crow Wing Lake	Hubbard
Crow Wing	Crow Wing
Crystal Bay	Lake
Cuba	Becker
Culdrum	Morrison
Culver	St. Louis
Cushing	Morrison
Custer	Lyon
Daggett Brook	Crow Wing
Dahlgren	Carver
Dailey	Mille Lacs
Dalbo	Isanti
Dale	Cottonwood
Dane Prairie	Otter Tail
Danforth	Pine
Danielson	Meeker
Danville	Blue Earth
Darling	Morrison
Darnen	Stevens
Darwin	Meeker
Dassel	Meeker
Davis	Kittson
Dead Lake	Otter Tail
Decoria	Blue Earth
Deer Creek	Otter Tail
Deer Park	Pennington
Deer River	Itasca
Deer	Roseau
Deerfield	Cass
Deerfield	Steele
Deerhorn	Wilkin
Deerwood	Crow Wing
Deerwood	Kittson
Delafield	Jackson
Delavan	Faribault
Delaware	Grant
Delhi	Redwood
Dell Grove	Pine
Delton	Cottonwood
Denmark	Washington
Denver	Rock
Derrynane	Le Sueur
Des Moines River	Murray
Des Moines	Jackson
Detroit	Becker
Dewald	Nobles
Dewey	Roseau
Dexter	Mower
Diamond Lake	Lincoln
Dieter	Roseau
Dollymount	Traverse
Donnelly	Marshall
Donnelly	Stevens
Dora	Otter Tail
Douglas	Dakota
Dover	Olmsted
Dovray	Murray
Dovre	Kandiyohi
Drammen	Lincoln
Dresbach	Winona
Dryden	Sibley
Dublin	Swift
Dudley	Clearwater
Duluth	St. Louis
Dunbar	Faribault
Dunn	Otter Tail
Durand	Beltrami
Eagle Lake	Otter Tail
Eagle Point	Marshall
Eagle	Carlton
Eagle Valley	Todd
Eagle View	Becker
Eagles Nest	St. Louis
East Chain	Martin
East Lake Lillian	Kandiyohi
East Park	Marshall
East Side	Mille Lacs
East Valley	Marshall
Eastern	Otter Tail
Echo	Yellow Medicine
Eckles	Beltrami
Eckvoll	Marshall
Eddy	Clearwater
Eden Lake	Stearns
Eden	Brown
Eden	Pipestone
Eden	Polk
Edison	Swift
Edna	Otter Tail
Edwards	Kandiyohi
Effington	Otter Tail
Eglon	Clay
Eidsvold	Lyon
Elba	Winona
Elbow Lake	Grant
Eldorado	Stevens
Elgin	Wabasha
Elizabeth	Otter Tail
Elk Lake	Grant
Elk	Nobles
Elkton	Clay
Ellington	Dodge
Ellsborough	Murray
Ellsburg	St. Louis
Ellsworth	Meeker
Elm Creek	Martin
Elmdale	Morrison
Elmer	Pipestone
Elmer	St. Louis
Elmira	Olmsted
Elmo	Otter Tail
Elmore	Faribault
Elmwood	Clay
Elysian	Le Sueur
Emardville	Red Lake
Embarrass	St. Louis
Emerald	Faribault
Emmet	Renville
Enstrom	Roseau
Enterprise	Jackson
Equality	Red Lake
Erdahl	Grant
Erhards Grove	Otter Tail
Ericson	Renville
Erie	Becker
Erin	Rice
Espelie	Marshall
Esther	Polk
Euclid	Polk
Eureka	Dakota
Evansville	Douglas
Everglade	Stevens
Evergreen	Becker
Everts	Otter Tail
Ewington	Jackson
Excel	Marshall
Eyota	Olmsted
Fahlun	Kandiyohi
Fair Haven	Stearns
Fairbanks	St. Louis
Fairfax	Polk
Fairfield	Crow Wing
Fairfield	Swift
Fairmont	Martin
Fairview	Cass
Fairview	Lyon
Falk	Clearwater
Fall Lake	Lake
Falun	Roseau
Fanny	Polk
Farden	Hubbard
Farley	Polk
Farm Island	Aitkin
Farming	Stearns
Farmington	Olmsted
Fawn Lake	Todd
Faxon	Sibley
Fayal	St. Louis
Featherstone	Goodhue
Feeley	Itasca
Felton	Clay
Fenton	Murray
Fergus Falls	Otter Tail
Fern	Hubbard
Field	St. Louis
Fieldon	Watonwan
Fillmore	Fillmore
Fine Lakes	St. Louis
Finlayson	Pine
Fish Lake	Chisago
Fisher	Polk
Fleming	Aitkin
Fleming	Pine
Flom	Norman
Floodwood	St. Louis
Flora	Renville
Florence	Goodhue
Florida	Yellow Medicine
Flowing	Clay
Foldahl	Marshall
Folden	Otter Tail
Folsom	Traverse
Ford	Kanabec
Forest Area	Lake of the Woods
Forest City	Meeker
Forest Prairie	Meeker
Forest	Becker
Forest	Rice
Forestville	Fillmore
Fork	Marshall
Fort Ripley	Crow Wing
Fortier	Yellow Medicine
Fossum	Norman
Foster	Big Stone
Foster	Faribault
Fountain Prairie	Pipestone
Fountain	Fillmore
Fox Lake	Martin
Foxhome	Wilkin
Framnas	Stevens
Franconia	Chisago
Frankford	Mower
Franklin	Wright
Fraser	Martin
Fredenberg	St. Louis
Freeborn	Freeborn
Freedom	Waseca
Freeland	Lac qui Parle
Freeman	Freeborn
Fremont	Winona
French Lake	Wright
French	St. Louis
Friberg	Otter Tail
Friendship	Yellow Medicine
Frohn	Beltrami
Gail Lake	Crow Wing
Galena	Martin
Gales	Redwood
Garden City	Blue Earth
Garden	Polk
Garfield	Lac qui Parle
Garfield	Polk
Garnes	Red Lake
Garrison	Crow Wing
Geneva	Freeborn
Gennessee	Kandiyohi
Gentilly	Polk
Georgetown	Clay
Germania	Todd
Germantown	Cottonwood
Gervais	Red Lake
Getty	Stearns
Gilchrist	Pope
Gillford	Wabasha
Gilmanton	Benton
Girard	Otter Tail
Glasgow	Wabasha
Glen	Aitkin
Glencoe	McLeod
Glendorado	Benton
Glenwood	Pope
Glyndon	Clay
Gnesen	St. Louis
Godfrey	Polk
Golden Valley	Roseau
Good Hope	Itasca
Good Hope	Norman
Goodhue	Goodhue
Goodland	Itasca
Goodridge	Pennington
Goose Prairie	Clay
Gordon	Todd
Gorman	Otter Tail
Gorton	Grant
Gould	Cass
Grace	Chippewa
Graceville	Big Stone
Grafton	Sibley
Graham Lakes	Nobles
Graham	Benton
Granby	Nicollet
Grand Forks	Polk
Grand Lake	St. Louis
Grand Meadow	Mower
Grand Plain	Marshall
Grand Prairie	Nobles
Grand Rapids	Itasca
Grandview	Lyon
Grange	Pipestone
Granite Falls	Chippewa
Granite Ledge	Benton
Granite Rock	Redwood
Granite	Morrison
Grant Valley	Beltrami
Granville	Kittson
Grass Lake	Kanabec
Grattan	Itasca
Gray	Pipestone
Great Bend	Cottonwood
Great Scott	St. Louis
Green Isle	Sibley
Green Lake	Kandiyohi
Green Meadow	Norman
Green Prairie	Morrison
Green Valley	Becker
Greenbush	Mille Lacs
Greenfield	Wabasha
Greenleaf	Meeker
Greenvale	Dakota
Greenway	Itasca
Greenwood	Clearwater
Greenwood	St. Louis
Gregory	Mahnomen
Grey Cloud Island	Washington
Grey Eagle	Todd
Grimstad	Roseau
Grove Lake	Pope
Grove Park-Tilden	Polk
Grove	Stearns
Gudrid	Lake of the Woods
Gully	Polk
Guthrie	Hubbard
Hagali	Beltrami
Hagen	Clay
Halden	St. Louis
Hale	McLeod
Hallock	Kittson
Halstad	Norman
Hamden	Becker
Hamlin	Lac qui Parle
Hammer	Yellow Medicine
Hammond	Polk
Hampden	Kittson
Hampton	Dakota
Hamre	Beltrami
Hancock	Carver
Hangaard	Clearwater
Hansonville	Lincoln
Hantho	Lac qui Parle
Harmony	Fillmore
Harris	Itasca
Harrison	Kandiyohi
Hart Lake	Hubbard
Hart	Winona
Hartford	Todd
Hartland	Freeborn
Harvey	Meeker
Hassan	Hennepin
Hassan Valley	McLeod
Haugen	Aitkin
Havana	Steele
Havelock	Chippewa
Haven	Sherburne
Haverhill	Olmsted
Hawk Creek	Renville
Hawley	Clay
Hay Brook	Kanabec
Hay Creek	Goodhue
Hayes	Swift
Hayfield	Dodge
Hayland	Mille Lacs
Hayward	Freeborn
Hazel Run	Yellow Medicine
Hazelton	Aitkin
Hazelton	Kittson
Hector	Renville
Hegbert	Swift
Hegne	Norman
Heier	Mahnomen
Height of Land	Becker
Helen	McLeod
Helena	Scott
Helga	Hubbard
Helgeland	Polk
Henderson	Sibley
Hendricks	Lincoln
Hendrickson	Hubbard
Hendrum	Norman
Henning	Otter Tail
Henrietta	Hubbard
Henryville	Renville
Hereim	Roseau
Heron Lake	Jackson
Hersey	Nobles
Hickory	Pennington
Higdem	Polk
High Forest	Olmsted
Highland Grove	Clay
Highland	Wabasha
Highlanding	Pennington
Highwater	Cottonwood
Hill Lake	Aitkin
Hill River	Polk
Hill	Kittson
Hillman	Kanabec
Hillman	Morrison
Hillsdale	Winona
Hinckley	Pine
Hines	Beltrami
Hiram	Cass
Hobart	Otter Tail
Hodges	Stevens
Hoff	Pope
Hokah	Houston
Holden	Goodhue
Holding	Stearns
Holland	Kandiyohi
Holly	Murray
Hollywood	Carver
Holmesville	Becker
Holst	Clearwater
Holt	Fillmore
Holt	Marshall
Holy Cross	Clay
Holyoke	Carlton
Home Brook	Cass
Home Lake	Norman
Home	Brown
Homer	Winona
Homestead	Otter Tail
Honner	Redwood
Hope	Lincoln
Hornet	Beltrami
Horton	Stevens
Houston	Houston
Hubbard	Hubbard
Hubbard	Polk
Hudson	Douglas
Humboldt	Clay
Hunter	Jackson
Huntersville	Wadena
Huntly	Marshall
Huntsville	Polk
Huss	Roseau
Hutchinson	McLeod
Hyde Park	Wabasha
Ida	Douglas
Ideal	Crow Wing
Idun	Aitkin
Indian Lake	Nobles
Industrial	St. Louis
Inguadona	Cass
Inman	Otter Tail
Iona	Murray
Iona	Todd
Iosco	Waseca
Iron Range	Itasca
Irondale	Crow Wing
Irving	Kandiyohi
Isanti	Isanti
Island Lake	Lyon
Island Lake	Mahnomen
Isle Harbor	Mille Lacs
Itasca	Clearwater
Jackson	Scott
Jadis	Roseau
Jamestown	Blue Earth
Janesville	Waseca
Jay	Martin
Jefferson	Houston
Jenkins	Crow Wing
Jessenland	Sibley
Jevne	Aitkin
Jo Daviess	Faribault
Johnson	Polk
Johnsonville	Redwood
Jones	Beltrami
Jordan	Fillmore
Judson	Blue Earth
Jupiter	Kittson
Kalevala	Carlton
Kalmar	Olmsted
Kanabec	Kanabec
Kanaranzi	Rock
Kandiyohi	Kandiyohi
Kandota	Todd
Kasota	Le Sueur
Kathio	Mille Lacs
Keene	Clay
Kego	Cass
Kelliher	Beltrami
Kelsey	St. Louis
Kelso	Sibley
Kenyon	Goodhue
Kerkhoven	Swift
Kerrick	Pine
Kertsonville	Polk
Kettle River	Pine
Keystone	Polk
Kiel	Lake of the Woods
Kiester	Faribault
Kildare	Swift
Kilkenny	Le Sueur
Kimball	Jackson
Kimberly	Aitkin
King	Polk
Kinghurst	Itasca
Kingman	Renville
Kingston	Meeker
Kintire	Redwood
Knife Lake	Kanabec
Knute	Polk
Kragero	Chippewa
Kragnes	Clay
Krain	Stearns
Kratka	Pennington
Kroschel	Kanabec
Kugler	St. Louis
Kurtz	Clay
La Crescent	Houston
La Crosse	Jackson
La Garde	Mahnomen
La Grand	Douglas
La Prairie	Clearwater
Lac qui Parle	Lac qui Parle
Lafayette	Nicollet
Lake Alice	Hubbard
Lake Andrew	Kandiyohi
Lake Belt	Martin
Lake Benton	Lincoln
Lake Edwards	Crow Wing
Lake Elizabeth	Kandiyohi
Lake Emma	Hubbard
Lake Eunice	Becker
Lake Fremont	Martin
Lake George	Hubbard
Lake George	Stearns
Lake Grove	Mahnomen
Lake Hanska	Brown
Lake Hattie	Hubbard
Lake Henry	Stearns
Lake Ida	Norman
Lake Jessie	Itasca
Lake Johanna	Pope
Lake Lillian	Kandiyohi
Lake Marshall	Lyon
Lake Mary	Douglas
Lake Park	Becker
Lake Pleasant	Red Lake
Lake Prairie	Nicollet
Lake Sarah	Murray
Lake Shore	Lac qui Parle
Lake Stay	Lincoln
Lake	Roseau
Lake	Wabasha
Lake Valley	Traverse
Lake View	Becker
Lakeport	Hubbard
Lakeside	Aitkin
Lakeside	Cottonwood
Laketown	Carver
Lakeview	Carlton
Lakewood	Lake of the Woods
Lakewood	St. Louis
Lakin	Morrison
Lambert	Red Lake
Lamberton	Redwood
Lammers	Beltrami
Land	Grant
Lanesburgh	Le Sueur
Langhei	Pope
Langola	Benton
Langor	Beltrami
Lansing	Mower
Laona	Roseau
Larkin	Nobles
Lavell	St. Louis
Lawrence	Grant
Lawrence	Itasca
Le Ray	Blue Earth
Le Roy	Mower
Le Sauk	Stearns
Leaf Lake	Otter Tail
Leaf Mountain	Otter Tail
Leaf River	Wadena
Leaf Valley	Douglas
Leavenworth	Brown
Lee	Aitkin
Lee	Beltrami
Lee	Norman
Leech Lake	Cass
Leeds	Murray
Leenthrop	Chippewa
Leiding	St. Louis
Leigh	Morrison
Lemond	Steele
Lent	Chisago
Leon	Clearwater
Leon	Goodhue
Leonardsville	Traverse
Leota	Nobles
Leslie	Todd
Lessor	Polk
Leven	Pope
Lewis	Mille Lacs
Lexington	Le Sueur
Libby	Aitkin
Liberty	Beltrami
Liberty	Itasca
Liberty	Polk
Lida	Otter Tail
Lien	Grant
Lima	Cass
Lime Lake	Murray
Lime	Blue Earth
Limestone	Lincoln
Lincoln	Blue Earth
Lincoln	Marshall
Lind	Roseau
Linden Grove	St. Louis
Linden	Brown
Linsell	Marshall
Linwood	Anoka
Lisbon	Yellow Medicine
Lismore	Nobles
Litchfield	Meeker
Little Elbow	Mahnomen
Little Elk	Todd
Little Falls	Morrison
Little Pine	Crow Wing
Little Rock	Nobles
Little Sauk	Todd
Livonia	Sherburne
Lockhart	Norman
Lodi	Mower
Logan	Aitkin
Logan	Grant
London	Freeborn
Lone Pine	Itasca
Lone Tree	Chippewa
Long Lake	Crow Wing
Long Lake	Watonwan
Long Lost Lake	Clearwater
Long Prairie	Todd
Loon Lake	Cass
Lorain	Nobles
Louisville	Red Lake
Louisville	Scott
Louriston	Chippewa
Lowell	Polk
Lowville	Murray
Lucas	Lyon
Lund	Douglas
Lura	Faribault
Lutsen	Cook
Luverne	Rock
Luxemburg	Stearns
Lyle	Mower
Lynd	Lyon
Lynden	Stearns
Lynn	McLeod
Lyons	Lyon
Lyons	Wadena
Lyra	Blue Earth
Macsville	Grant
Macville	Aitkin
Madelia	Watonwan
Madison	Lac qui Parle
Magnolia	Rock
Mahtowa	Carlton
Maine Prairie	Stearns
Maine	Otter Tail
Malmo	Aitkin
Malta	Big Stone
Malung	Roseau
Mamre	Kandiyohi
Manannah	Meeker
Manchester	Freeborn
Mandt	Chippewa
Manfred	Lac qui Parle
Mankato	Blue Earth
Mansfield	Freeborn
Manston	Wilkin
Mantorville	Dodge
Mantrap	Hubbard
Manyaska	Martin
Maple Grove	Becker
Maple Grove	Crow Wing
Maple Lake	Wright
Maple Ridge	Beltrami
Maple Ridge	Isanti
Maple	Cass
Mapleton	Blue Earth
Maplewood	Otter Tail
Marble	Lincoln
Marcell	Itasca
Marion	Olmsted
Marsh Creek	Mahnomen
Marsh Grove	Marshall
Marshall	Mower
Marshan	Dakota
Marshfield	Lincoln
Martin	Rock
Martinsburg	Renville
Mary	Norman
Marysland	Swift
Marysville	Wright
Mason	Murray
Max	Itasca
Maxwell	Lac qui Parle
May	Cass
May	Washington
Mayfield	Pennington
Mayhew Lake	Benton
Mayville	Houston
Maywood	Benton
Mazeppa	Wabasha
McCauleyville	Wilkin
McCrea	Marshall
McDavitt	St. Louis
McDonaldsville	Norman
McDougald	Lake of the Woods
McGregor	Aitkin
McKinley	Cass
McPherson	Blue Earth
Meadow Brook	Cass
Meadow	Wadena
Meadowlands	St. Louis
Meadows	Wilkin
Medford	Steele
Medo	Blue Earth
Mehurin	Lac qui Parle
Melrose	Stearns
Melville	Renville
Meriden	Steele
Merton	Steele
Mickinock	Roseau
Middle River	Marshall
Middletown	Jackson
Middleville	Wright
Midway	Cottonwood
Midway	St. Louis
Milaca	Mille Lacs
Milford	Brown
Millerville	Douglas
Millward	Aitkin
Millwood	Stearns
Milo	Mille Lacs
Milton	Dodge
Miltona	Douglas
Minden	Benton
Minerva	Clearwater
Minneiska	Wabasha
Minneola	Goodhue
Minneota	Jackson
Minnesota Falls	Yellow Medicine
Minnesota Lake	Faribault
Minnewaska	Pope
Minnie	Beltrami
Mission Creek	Pine
Mission	Crow Wing
Mitchell	Wilkin
Moe	Douglas
Moland	Clay
Moltke	Sibley
Money Creek	Houston
Monroe	Lyon
Monson	Traverse
Montgomery	Le Sueur
Monticello	Wright
Moonshine	Big Stone
Moore	Stevens
Moorhead	Clay
Moose Creek	Clearwater
Moose Lake	Beltrami
Moose Lake	Carlton
Moose Lake	Cass
Moose Park	Itasca
Moose River	Marshall
Moose	Roseau
Moran	Todd
Moranville	Roseau
Morcom	St. Louis
Morgan	Redwood
Morken	Clay
Morrill	Morrison
Morris	Stevens
Morrison	Aitkin
Morristown	Rice
Morse	Itasca
Morse	St. Louis
Moscow	Freeborn
Motley	Morrison
Moulton	Murray
Mound Prairie	Houston
Mound	Rock
Mount Morris	Morrison
Mount Pleasant	Wabasha
Mount Vernon	Winona
Mountain Lake	Cottonwood
Moyer	Swift
Moylan	Marshall
Mudgett	Mille Lacs
Mulligan	Brown
Munch	Pine
Munson	Stearns
Murray	Murray
Myhre	Lake of the Woods
Nashville	Martin
Nashwauk	Itasca
Nebish	Beltrami
Nelson Park	Marshall
Nelson	Watonwan
Nereson	Roseau
Nesbit	Polk
Ness	St. Louis
Nessel	Chisago
Nevada	Mower
Nevis	Hubbard
New Auburn	Sibley
New Avon	Redwood
New Dosey	Pine
New Folden	Marshall
New Hartford	Winona
New Haven	Olmsted
New Independence	St. Louis
New London	Kandiyohi
New Maine	Marshall
New Market	Scott
New Prairie	Pope
New Richland	Waseca
New Solum	Marshall
New Sweden	Nicollet
Newburg	Fillmore
Newry	Freeborn
Newton	Otter Tail
Nickerson	Pine
Nicollet	Nicollet
Nidaros	Otter Tail
Nilsen	Wilkin
Nininger	Dakota
Nokay Lake	Crow Wing
Nora	Clearwater
Nora	Pope
Norden	Pennington
Nordick	Wilkin
Nordland	Aitkin
Nordland	Lyon
Nore	Itasca
Norfolk	Renville
Norman	Pine
Norman	Yellow Medicine
Normania	Yellow Medicine
Normanna	St. Louis
North Branch	Isanti
North Fork	Stearns
North Germany	Wadena
North Hero	Redwood
North Ottawa	Grant
North Red River	Kittson
North Star	Brown
North Star	St. Louis
North	Pennington
Northern	Beltrami
Northfield	Rice
Northland	Polk
Northland	St. Louis
Norton	Winona
Norway Lake	Kandiyohi
Norway	Fillmore
Norway	Kittson
Norwegian Grove	Otter Tail
Numedal	Pennington
Nunda	Freeborn
Oak Lawn	Crow Wing
Oak Park	Marshall
Oak	Stearns
Oak Valley	Otter Tail
Oakland	Freeborn
Oakland	Mahnomen
Oakport	Clay
Oakwood	Wabasha
O'Brien	Beltrami
Odessa	Big Stone
Odin	Watonwan
Ogema	Pine
Olney	Nobles
Omro	Yellow Medicine
Onamia	Mille Lacs
Onstad	Polk
Orange	Douglas
Orion	Olmsted
Oronoco	Olmsted
Orrock	Sherburne
Orton	Wadena
Ortonville	Big Stone
Orwell	Otter Tail
Osage	Becker
Osakis	Douglas
Osborne	Pipestone
Oscar	Otter Tail
Osceola	Renville
Oshawa	Nicollet
Oshkosh	Yellow Medicine
Oteneagen	Itasca
Otisco	Waseca
Otrey	Big Stone
Ottawa	Le Sueur
Otter Tail Peninsula	Cass
Otter Tail	Otter Tail
Otto	Otter Tail
Owatonna	Steele
Owens	St. Louis
Oxford	Isanti
Paddock	Otter Tail
Page	Mille Lacs
Palmer	Sherburne
Palmville	Roseau
Palmyra	Renville
Parke	Clay
Parker	Marshall
Parker	Morrison
Parkers Prairie	Otter Tail
Parnell	Polk
Parnell	Traverse
Partridge	Pine
Paxton	Redwood
Paynesville	Stearns
Peace	Kanabec
Pelan	Kittson
Pelican Lake	Grant
Pelican	Crow Wing
Pelican	Otter Tail
Pembina	Mahnomen
Penn	McLeod
Pepin	Wabasha
Pepperton	Stevens
Pequaywan	St. Louis
Perch Lake	Carlton
Percy	Kittson
Perham	Otter Tail
Perry Lake	Crow Wing
Perry	Lac qui Parle
Petersburg	Jackson
Pickerel Lake	Freeborn
Pierz	Morrison
Pike Bay	Cass
Pike Creek	Morrison
Pike	St. Louis
Pillsbury	Swift
Pilot Grove	Faribault
Pilot Mound	Fillmore
Pine City	Pine
Pine Island	Goodhue
Pine Lake	Cass
Pine Lake	Clearwater
Pine Lake	Otter Tail
Pine Lake	Pine
Pine Point	Becker
Pine River	Cass
Plainview	Wabasha
Platte Lake	Crow Wing
Platte	Morrison
Pleasant Grove	Olmsted
Pleasant Hill	Winona
Pleasant Mound	Blue Earth
Pleasant Prairie	Martin
Pleasant Valley	Mower
Pleasant View	Norman
Pliny	Aitkin
Pohlitz	Roseau
Pokegama	Pine
Polk Centre	Pennington
Polonia	Roseau
Pomme de Terre	Grant
Pomroy	Itasca
Pomroy	Kanabec
Ponto Lake	Cass
Poplar Grove	Roseau
Poplar River	Red Lake
Poplar	Cass
Popple Grove	Mahnomen
Popple	Clearwater
Poppleton	Kittson
Port Hope	Beltrami
Portage	St. Louis
Posen	Yellow Medicine
Potamo	Lake of the Woods
Powers	Cass
Prairie Lake	St. Louis
Prairie View	Wilkin
Prairieville	Brown
Preble	Fillmore
Prescott	Faribault
Preston Lake	Renville
Preston	Fillmore
Princeton	Mille Lacs
Prior	Big Stone
Prosper	Lake of the Woods
Providence	Lac qui Parle
Pulaski	Morrison
Queen	Polk
Quincy	Olmsted
Quiring	Beltrami
Rabbit Lake	Crow Wing
Racine	Mower
Rail Prairie	Morrison
Randolph	Dakota
Ransom	Nobles
Rapid River	Lake of the Woods
Rapidan	Blue Earth
Ravenna	Dakota
Raymond	Stearns
Red Eye	Wadena
Red Lake Falls	Red Lake
Red Rock	Mower
Redpath	Traverse
Redwood Falls	Redwood
Reine	Roseau
Reiner	Pennington
Reis	Polk
Remer	Cass
Rendsville	Stevens
Reno	Pope
Reynolds	Todd
Rheiderland	Chippewa
Rhinehart	Polk
Rice River	Aitkin
Rice	Clearwater
Riceland	Freeborn
Riceville	Becker
Rich Valley	McLeod
Richardson	Morrison
Richardville	Kittson
Richland	Rice
Richmond	Winona
Richwood	Becker
Ridgely	Nicollet
Ripley	Dodge
Ripley	Morrison
River Falls	Pennington
River	Red Lake
Riverdale	Watonwan
Riverside	Lac qui Parle
Riverton	Clay
Roberts	Wilkin
Rochester	Olmsted
Rock Dell	Olmsted
Rock Lake	Lyon
Rock	Pipestone
Rockford	Wright
Rocksbury	Pennington
Rockville	Stearns
Rockwell	Norman
Rockwood	Hubbard
Rockwood	Wadena
Rogers	Cass
Rolling Forks	Pope
Rolling Green	Martin
Rollingstone	Winona
Rollis	Marshall
Rome	Faribault
Roome	Polk
Roosevelt	Beltrami
Roosevelt	Crow Wing
Roscoe	Goodhue
Rose Dell	Rock
Rose Hill	Cottonwood
Rosebud	Polk
Rosedale	Mahnomen
Roseland	Kandiyohi
Rosendale	Watonwan
Roseville	Grant
Roseville	Kandiyohi
Rosewood	Chippewa
Rosing	Morrison
Ross Lake	Crow Wing
Ross	Roseau
Rost	Jackson
Round Grove	McLeod
Round Lake	Becker
Round Lake	Jackson
Round Prairie	Todd
Royal	Lincoln
Royalton	Pine
Rulien	Lake of the Woods
Runeberg	Becker
Rush Lake	Otter Tail
Rushseba	Chisago
Russia	Polk
Rutland	Martin
Sacred Heart	Renville
Sago	Itasca
Salem	Cass
Salem	Olmsted
Salo	Aitkin
San Francisco	Carver
Sand Creek	Scott
Sand Lake	Itasca
Sanders	Pennington
Sandnes	Yellow Medicine
Sandstone	Pine
Sandsville	Polk
Sandy	St. Louis
Sanford	Grant
Santiago	Sherburne
Saratoga	Winona
Sargeant	Mower
Sauk Centre	Stearns
Sauk Rapids	Benton
Savannah	Becker
Scambler	Otter Tail
Scandia	Polk
Scandia Valley	Morrison
Schoolcraft	Hubbard
Schroeder	Cook
Sciota	Dakota
Scott	Stevens
Seavey	Aitkin
Seely	Faribault
Selma	Cottonwood
Severance	Sibley
Seward	Nobles
Shafer	Chisago
Shamrock	Aitkin
Shaokatan	Lincoln
Sharon	Le Sueur
Shelburne	Lyon
Shelby	Blue Earth
Sheldon	Houston
Shell Lake	Becker
Shell River	Wadena
Shell Rock	Freeborn
Shelly	Norman
Sheridan	Redwood
Sherman	Redwood
Shetek	Murray
Shevlin	Clearwater
Shible	Swift
Shieldsville	Rice
Shingobee	Cass
Shooks	Beltrami
Shotley	Beltrami
Sibley	Crow Wing
Sibley	Sibley
Sigel	Brown
Silver Brook	Carlton
Silver Creek	Lake
Silver Creek	Wright
Silver Lake	Martin
Silver Leaf	Becker
Silver	Carlton
Silverton	Pennington
Sinclair	Clearwater
Sinnott	Marshall
Sioux Agency	Yellow Medicine
Sioux Valley	Jackson
Six Mile Grove	Swift
Skagen	Roseau
Skandia	Murray
Skane	Kittson
Skelton	Carlton
Skree	Clay
Slater	Cass
Slayton	Murray
Sletten	Polk
Smiley	Pennington
Smoky Hollow	Cass
Sodus	Lyon
Solem	Douglas
Soler	Roseau
Solway	St. Louis
Somerset	Steele
South Bend	Blue Earth
South Branch	Watonwan
South Fork	Kanabec
South Harbor	Mille Lacs
South Red River	Kittson
Southbrook	Cottonwood
Southside	Wright
Spalding	Aitkin
Spang	Itasca
Sparta	Chippewa
Spencer Brook	Isanti
Spencer	Aitkin
Split Rock	Carlton
Splithand	Itasca
Spooner	Lake of the Woods
Spring Brook	Kittson
Spring Creek	Becker
Spring Creek	Norman
Spring Grove	Houston
Spring Hill	Stearns
Spring Lake	Scott
Spring Prairie	Clay
Spring Valley	Fillmore
Springdale	Redwood
Springfield	Cottonwood
Springvale	Isanti
Springwater	Rock
Spruce Grove	Becker
Spruce Grove	Beltrami
Spruce Hill	Douglas
Spruce	Roseau
Spruce Valley	Marshall
St. Charles	Winona
St. George	Benton
St. James	Watonwan
St. Johns	Kandiyohi
St. Joseph	Kittson
St. Joseph	Stearns
St. Lawrence	Scott
St. Martin	Stearns
St. Mary	Waseca
St. Mathias	Crow Wing
St. Olaf	Otter Tail
St. Vincent	Kittson
St. Wendel	Stearns
Stafford	Roseau
Stanchfield	Isanti
Stanford	Isanti
Stanley	Lyon
Stanton	Goodhue
Staples	Todd
Star Lake	Otter Tail
Star	Pennington
Stark	Brown
Stately	Brown
Steamboat River	Hubbard
Steenerson	Beltrami
Sterling	Blue Earth
Stevens	Stevens
Stillwater	Washington
Stockholm	Wright
Stokes	Itasca
Stokes	Roseau
Stoneham	Chippewa
Stoney Brook	St. Louis
Stony Brook	Grant
Stony River	Lake
Stony Run	Yellow Medicine
Storden	Cottonwood
Stowe Prairie	Todd
Straight River	Hubbard
Strand	Norman
Sturgeon Lake	Pine
Sturgeon	St. Louis
Sugar Bush	Becker
Sugar Bush	Beltrami
Sullivan	Polk
Summit Lake	Nobles
Summit	Beltrami
Summit	Steele
Sumner	Fillmore
Sumter	McLeod
Sundal	Norman
Sundown	Redwood
Sunnyside	Wilkin
Sunrise	Chisago
Svea	Kittson
Sverdrup	Otter Tail
Swan Lake	Stevens
Swan River	Morrison
Swanville	Morrison
Swede Grove	Meeker
Swede Prairie	Yellow Medicine
Swedes Forest	Redwood
Sweet	Pipestone
Swenoda	Swift
Swiftwater	Lake of the Woods
Sylvan	Cass
Synnes	Stevens
Tabor	Polk
Tamarac	Marshall
Tanberg	Wilkin
Tansem	Clay
Tara	Swift
Tara	Traverse
Taylor	Beltrami
Taylor	Traverse
Tegner	Kittson
Teien	Kittson
Ten Lake	Beltrami
Ten Mile Lake	Lac qui Parle
Tenhassen	Martin
Terrebonne	Red Lake
Thief Lake	Marshall
Third River	Itasca
Thomastown	Wadena
Thompson	Kittson
Thomson	Carlton
Thorpe	Hubbard
Three Lakes	Redwood
Thunder Lake	Cass
Timothy	Crow Wing
Tintah	Traverse
Toad Lake	Becker
Todd	Hubbard
Tofte	Cook
Toivola	St. Louis
Toqua	Big Stone
Tordenskjold	Otter Tail
Torning	Swift
Torrey	Cass
Township 157-30	Lake of the Woods
Township 158-30	Lake of the Woods
Transit	Sibley
Traverse	Nicollet
Trelipe	Cass
Trondhjem	Otter Tail
Trout Lake	Itasca
Troy	Pipestone
Troy	Renville
Tumuli	Otter Tail
Tunsberg	Chippewa
Turner	Aitkin
Turtle Creek	Todd
Turtle Lake	Beltrami
Turtle Lake	Cass
Turtle River	Beltrami
Twin Lakes	Carlton
Twin Lakes	Mahnomen
Two Inlets	Becker
Two Rivers	Morrison
Tynsid	Polk
Tyro	Yellow Medicine
Tyrone	Le Sueur
Udolpho	Mower
Ulen	Clay
Underwood	Redwood
Union Grove	Meeker
Union	Houston
Urness	Douglas
Utica	Winona
Vail	Redwood
Vallers	Lyon
Valley	Marshall
Van Buren	St. Louis
Vasa	Goodhue
Vega	Marshall
Veldt	Marshall
Verdi	Lincoln
Verdon	Aitkin
Vermilion Lake	St. Louis
Vermillion	Dakota
Vernon Center	Blue Earth
Vernon	Dodge
Verona	Faribault
Vesta	Redwood
Victor	Wright
Victory	Lake of the Woods
Viding	Clay
Vienna	Rock
Viking	Marshall
Villard	Todd
Vineland	Polk
Viola	Olmsted
Vivian	Waseca
Waasa	St. Louis
Wabana	Itasca
Wabanica	Lake of the Woods
Wabedo	Cass
Waconia	Carver
Wacouta	Goodhue
Wadena	Wadena
Wagner	Aitkin
Wakefield	Stearns
Walcott	Rice
Walden	Cass
Walden	Pope
Walhalla	Lake of the Woods
Walls	Traverse
Walnut Lake	Faribault
Walter	Lac qui Parle
Waltham	Mower
Walworth	Becker
Wanamingo	Goodhue
Wang	Renville
Wanger	Marshall
Ward	Todd
Warren	Winona
Warrenton	Marshall
Warsaw	Goodhue
Warsaw	Rice
Washington Lake	Sibley
Washington	Le Sueur
Wasioja	Dodge
Waskish	Beltrami
Watab	Benton
Waterbury	Redwood
Waterford	Dakota
Watertown	Carver
Waterville	Le Sueur
Watopa	Wabasha
Waukenabo	Aitkin
Waukon	Norman
Waverly	Martin
Wawina	Itasca
Wealthwood	Aitkin
Webster	Rice
Weimer	Jackson
Welch	Goodhue
Wellington	Renville
Wells	Rice
Wergeland	Yellow Medicine
West Albany	Wabasha
West Bank	Swift
West Heron Lake	Jackson
West Lakeland	Washington
West Newton	Nicollet
West Union	Todd
West Valley	Marshall
Westbrook	Cottonwood
Westerheim	Lyon
Western	Otter Tail
Westfield	Dodge
Westford	Martin
Westline	Redwood
Westport	Pope
Westside	Nobles
Wheatland	Rice
Wheeler	Lake of the Woods
Wheeling	Rice
White Bear Lake	Pope
White Bear	Ramsey
White Earth	Becker
White Oak	Hubbard
White Pine	Aitkin
White	St. Louis
Whited	Kanabec
Whitefield	Kandiyohi
Whiteford	Marshall
Whitewater	Winona
Wild Rice	Norman
Wildwood	Itasca
Wilkinson	Cass
Williams	Aitkin
Willmar	Kandiyohi
Willow Lake	Redwood
Willow Valley	St. Louis
Wilma	Pine
Wilmington	Houston
Wilmont	Nobles
Wilson	Cass
Wilson	Winona
Wilton	Waseca
Winchester	Norman
Windemere	Pine
Windom	Mower
Windsor	Traverse
Winfield	Renville
Wing River	Wadena
Winger	Polk
Winnebago	Houston
Winsor	Clearwater
Winsted	McLeod
Wirt	Itasca
Wisconsin	Jackson
Wiscoy	Winona
Wolf Lake	Becker
Wolford	Crow Wing
Wolverton	Wilkin
Wood Lake	Yellow Medicine
Woodland	Wright
Woodrow	Beltrami
Woodrow	Cass
Woods	Chippewa
Woodside	Otter Tail
Woodside	Polk
Woodville	Waseca
Workman	Aitkin
Worthington	Nobles
Wrenshall	Carlton
Wright	Marshall
Wuori	St. Louis
Wyandotte	Pennington
Wyanett	Isanti
Wykeham	Todd
Wylie	Red Lake
Wyoming	Chisago
Yellow Bank	Lac qui Parle
York	Fillmore
Young America	Carver
Yucatán	Houston
Zion	Stearns
Zippel	Lake of the Woods
Zumbro	Wabasha
Zumbrota	Goodhue

== See also ==
- List of cities in Minnesota
- List of Minnesota counties
