= Swift, Minnesota =

Swift
- Unincorporated community
- Location within Minnesota Location within the United States
- Coordinates: 48°51′12″N 95°13′17″W
- Country: United States
- State: Minnesota
- County: Roseau County
- Township: Laona Township and Moranville Township
- Elevation: 1,083 ft (330 m)
- Time zone: UTC-6 (Central (CST))
  - Summer (DST): UTC-5 (CDT)
- ZIP code: 56763, 56673, and 56682
- Area code: 218
- GNIS feature ID: 652953

Swift is an unincorporated community in Roseau County, Minnesota, United States.

The community is located east-southeast of Warroad on State Highway 11 (MN 11). Swift is located within Laona Township and Moranville Township.

Nearby places include Warroad, Roosevelt, Williams, and Lake of the Woods at Muskeg Bay.
