= Wannaska, Minnesota =

Wannaska
- Unincorporated community
- Location within Minnesota Location within the United States
- Coordinates: 48°39′30″N 95°44′05″W
- Country: United States
- State: Minnesota
- County: Roseau County
- Township: Grimstad Township and Mickinock Township
- Elevation: 1,109 ft (338 m)
- Time zone: UTC-6 (Central (CST))
  - Summer (DST): UTC-5 (CDT)
- ZIP code: 56761
- Area code: 218
- GNIS feature ID: 653768

Wannaska is an unincorporated community in Roseau County, Minnesota, United States.

The community is located 13 miles south of Roseau on State Highway 89 (MN 89). Wannaska is located within Grimstad Township and Mickinock Township. Wannaska has a post office with ZIP code 56761.

Nearby places include Roseau and Hayes Lake State Park. The South Fork of the Roseau River flows through the community.

== History ==
A post office called Wannaska has been in operation since 1896. According to Warren Upham, Wannaska is said to be from Okwewanashko-ziibi, the native Ojibwe name for the Roseau River.

The first organ built by the Moe Pipe Organ Company is located at Riverside Lutheran Church of Wannaska. It was installed in 2000, prior to the official start of the company.

The Wannaska School permanently closed in 2006 and was used as the community center until 2011. It has since been turned into a motorsport repair business, Mechanical Innovations. After the closing, all area students were added to the Roseau School District.
