= List of place names of Swedish origin in the United States =

This is a list of Swedish place names in the United States. Many places in the United States, especially smaller ones, have been named after Sweden-related topics.

== Alabama ==
- Silverhill
- Thorsby

== California ==
- Arboga
- Jenny Lind
- Kingsburg

== Delaware ==
- Christiana
- Christina River
- Governor Printz Boulevard
- Shellpot Creek
- Swedes' Landing

== Idaho ==
- New Sweden

== Illinois ==
- Andover
- Bishop Hill
- Bishop Hill Colony
- Dahlgren
- Dahlgren Township
- Galva

== Indiana ==
- Nora

== Iowa ==
- Boxholm
- Calmar (Kalmar)
- Stockholm
- Swedesburg

== Kansas ==
- Falun
- Lindsborg
- Salemsborg
- Smolan (Småland)
- Smolan Township (Småland)

== Kentucky ==
- Sweeden

== Maine ==
- Jemtland (Jämtland)
- New Sweden
- Stockholm
- Sweden
- Westmanland (Västmanland)

== Michigan ==
- Skandia Township

== Minnesota ==
- Almelund
- Borgholm
- Dahlgren
- Dahlgren Township
- Falun Township
- Kalmar Township
- Karlstad
- Larsmont
- Lindstrom
- Malmo Township
- Malung
- Mora
- New Sweden
- New Sweden Township
- Ronneby
- Scandia
- Stark
- Stockholm Township
- Svea Township
- Tegner
- Upsala

== Missouri ==
- Swedeborg

== Nebraska ==
- Gothenburg (Göteborg)
- Malmo (Malmö)
- Swedeburg
- Swedehome

== Nevada ==
- Lund

== New Jersey ==
- Stockholm
- Swedesboro

== New York ==
- Dannemora (town)
- Dannemora (village)
- Stockholm
- Sweden
- Taberg

== North Dakota ==
- Svea

== Pennsylvania ==
- Lykens
- Swedeland
- Sweden Township
- Swedesburg
- Upland

== South Carolina ==
- Sweden

== South Dakota ==
- Stockholm
- Norbeck

== Texas ==
- New Sweden

== Washington ==
- Carlsborg (Karlsborg)
- Venersborg (Vänersborg)

== Wisconsin ==
- Lund
- Stockholm (village)
- Stockholm (town)
- West Sweden (town)

== See also ==
- List of non-US places that have a US place named after them
