= Laona Township =

Laona Township may refer to the following townships in the United States:

- Laona Township, Roseau County, Minnesota
- Laona Township, Winnebago County, Illinois
