= Pencer, Minnesota =

Pencer
- Unincorporated community
- Location within Minnesota Location within the United States
- Coordinates: 48°41′57″N 95°38′16″W
- Country: United States
- State: Minnesota
- County: Roseau
- Elevation: 1,093 ft (333 m)
- Time zone: UTC-6 (Central (CST))
  - Summer (DST): UTC-5 (CDT)
- Area code: 218
- GNIS feature ID: 649257

Pencer is an unincorporated community in Mickinock Township, Roseau County, Minnesota, United States.
