= Southeast Roseau, Minnesota =

Unorganized territory in Roseau County, Minnesota, United States

Coordinates: 48°43′02″N 95°19′25″W

- Unorganized territory
- Location of Southeast Roseau, within Roseau County, Minnesota
- Country: United States
- State: Minnesota
- County: Roseau

Area
  - Total: 179.1 sq mi (464 km^{2})
  - Land: 178.72 sq mi (462.9 km^{2})
  - Water: 0.38 sq mi (0.98 km^{2})

Population (2020)
  - Total: 215
  - Density: 1.20/sq mi (0.464/km^{2})
- Time zone: UTC-6 (Central (CST))
  - Summer (DST): UTC-5 (CDT)
- Area code: 218

Southeast Roseau is an unorganized territory in Roseau County, Minnesota, United States. The population was 215 at the 2020 census.

== Geography ==
According to the United States Census Bureau, the unorganized territory has a total area of 179.2 square miles (464.3 km^{2}); 178.8 square miles (463.2 km^{2}) is land and 0.4 square mile (1.1 km^{2}) (0.23%) is water.

== Demographics ==
As of the census of 2020, there were 215 people, 88 households, and 60 families residing in the unorganized territory. There were 104 with a vacancy rate of 15.4%. The racial makeup of the unorganized territory was 86.5% White, 0.9% Native American, 0.9% African American, and 0.9% from other races.

There were 88 households, out of which 31.8% had children under the age of 18 living with them, 68.2% were married couples living together, 9.1% had a female householder with no husband present. 18.2% of all households were made up of individuals, and 4.5% had someone living alone who was 65 years of age or older.

In the unorganized territory the population was spread out, with 24.2% below the age of 18, 73.0% over the age of 21, 24.7% over the age of 62, and 16.7% over the age of 65. The median age was 42.4 years. 47.9% of the population was female, with 52.1% being male.

As of 2023, the median income for a household in the unorganized territory was USD168,750. 0% of the population was estimated to be below the poverty line.
