= Skime, Minnesota =

Skime
- Unincorporated community
- Location within Minnesota Location within the United States
- Coordinates: 48°32′49″N 95°36′10″W
- Country: United States
- State: Minnesota
- County: Roseau
- Elevation: 1,191 ft (363 m)
- Time zone: UTC-6 (Central (CST))
  - Summer (DST): UTC-5 (CDT)
- Area code: 218
- GNIS feature ID: 654945

Skime is an unincorporated community in Reine Township, Roseau County, Minnesota, United States.
