= Lind Township, Roseau County, Minnesota =

Township in Minnesota, United States

Lind Township, Minnesota
- Township
- Location of Lind Township, within Roseau County, Minnesota
- Coordinates: 48°34′43″N 96°19′9″W
- Country: United States
- State: Minnesota
- County: Roseau

Area
  - Total: 36.1 sq mi (93.6 km^{2})
  - Land: 36.1 sq mi (93.6 km^{2})
  - Water: 0 sq mi (0.0 km^{2})
- Elevation: 1,080 ft (330 m)

Population (2020)
  - Total: 32
  - Density: 0.89/sq mi (0.34/km^{2})
- Time zone: UTC-6 (Central (CST))
  - Summer (DST): UTC-5 (CDT)
- FIPS code: 27-37196
- GNIS feature ID: 0664787

Lind Township is a township in Roseau County, Minnesota, United States. The population was 32 at the 2020 census.

Lind Township was named for John Lind, 14th Governor of Minnesota.

== Geography ==
According to the United States Census Bureau, the township has a total area of 36.1 square miles (93.6 km^{2}), all land.

== Demographics ==
As of the census of 2000, there were 58 people, 22 households, and 17 families residing in the township. The population density was 1.6 inhabitants per square mile (0.62/km^{2}). There were 30 housing units at an average density of 0.8 per square mile (0.31/km^{2}). The racial makeup of the township was 100.00% White.

There were 22 households, out of which 31.8% had children under the age of 18 living with them, 81.8% were married couples living together, and 18.2% were non-families. 18.2% of all households were made up of individuals, and 9.1% had someone living alone who was 65 years of age or older. The average household size was 2.64 and the average family size was 3.00.

In the township the population was spread out, with 29.3% under the age of 18, 3.4% from 18 to 24, 24.1% from 25 to 44, 22.4% from 45 to 64, and 20.7% who were 65 years of age or older. The median age was 37 years. For every 100 females, there were 100.0 males. For every 100 females age 18 and over, there were 95.2 males.

The median income for a household in the township was $26,250, and the median income for a family was $33,750. Males had a median income of $8,438 versus $30,625 for females. The per capita income for the township was $11,005. None of the population and none of the families were below the poverty line.
