= Poplar Grove Township, Roseau County, Minnesota =

Township in Minnesota, United States

Poplar Grove Township, Minnesota
- Township
- Location of Poplar Grove Township, within Roseau County, Minnesota
- Coordinates: 48°35′4″N 95°56′20″W
- Country: United States
- State: Minnesota
- County: Roseau

Area
  - Total: 36.0 sq mi (93.2 km^{2})
  - Land: 35.9 sq mi (93.1 km^{2})
  - Water: 0.039 sq mi (0.1 km^{2})
- Elevation: 1,201 ft (366 m)

Population (2020)
  - Total: 81
  - Density: 2.3/sq mi (0.87/km^{2})
- Time zone: UTC-6 (Central (CST))
  - Summer (DST): UTC-5 (CDT)
- FIPS code: 27-51982
- GNIS feature ID: 0665338

Poplar Grove Township is a township in Roseau County, Minnesota, United States. The population was 81 at the 2020 census.

== Geography ==
According to the United States Census Bureau, the township has a total area of 36.0 square miles (93.2 km^{2}); 36.0 square miles (93.1 km^{2}) is land and 0.04 square mile (0.1 km^{2}) (0.06%) is water.

== Demographics ==
As of the census of 2000, there were 80 people, 31 households, and 22 families residing in the township. The population density was 2.2 people per square mile (0.9/km^{2}). There were 41 housing units at an average density of 1.1/sq mi (0.4/km^{2}). The racial makeup of the township was 98.75% White and 1.25% Asian.

There were 31 households, out of which 35.5% had children under the age of 18 living with them, 67.7% were married couples living together, and 29.0% were non-families. 29.0% of all households were made up of individuals, and 22.6% had someone living alone who was 65 years of age or older. The average household size was 2.58 and the average family size was 3.23.

In the township the population was spread out, with 25.0% under the age of 18, 6.3% from 18 to 24, 26.3% from 25 to 44, 26.3% from 45 to 64, and 16.3% who were 65 years of age or older. The median age was 40 years. For every 100 females, there were 116.2 males. For every 100 females age 18 and over, there were 100.0 males.

The median income for a household in the township was $36,875, and the median income for a family was $51,875. Males had a median income of $29,375 versus $26,250 for females. The per capita income for the township was $15,665. There were no families and 3.8% of the population living below the poverty line, including no under eighteens and 27.3% of those over 64.
