= Skagen Township, Roseau County, Minnesota =

Township in Minnesota, United States

Skagen Township, Minnesota
- Township
- Location of Skagen Township, within Roseau County, Minnesota
- Coordinates: 48°46′5″N 96°3′46″W
- Country: United States
- State: Minnesota
- County: Roseau

Area
  - Total: 35.1 sq mi (90.9 km^{2})
  - Land: 35.1 sq mi (90.8 km^{2})
  - Water: 0 sq mi (0.0 km^{2})
- Elevation: 1,053 ft (321 m)

Population (2020)
  - Total: 202
  - Density: 5.76/sq mi (2.22/km^{2})
- Time zone: UTC-6 (Central (CST))
  - Summer (DST): UTC-5 (CDT)
- FIPS code: 27-60610
- GNIS feature ID: 0665624

Skagen Township is a township in Roseau County, Minnesota, United States. The population was 202 at the 2020 census.

Skagen Township was named for Albert O. Skagen, a county official.

== Geography ==
According to the United States Census Bureau, the township has a total area of 35.1 square miles (90.9 km^{2}); 35.1 square miles (90.8 km^{2}) is land and 0.03% is water.

== Demographics ==
As of the census of 2000, there were 235 people, 88 households, and 68 families residing in the township. The population density was 6.7 people per square mile (2.6/km^{2}). There were 96 housing units at an average density of 2.7/sq mi (1.1/km^{2}). The racial makeup of the township was 99.57% White, and 0.43% from two or more races.

There were 88 households, out of which 38.6% had children under the age of 18 living with them, 68.2% were married couples living together, 6.8% had a female householder with no husband present, and 21.6% were non-families. 17.0% of all households were made up of individuals, and 3.4% had someone living alone who was 65 years of age or older. The average household size was 2.67 and the average family size was 3.06.

In the township the population was spread out, with 31.5% under the age of 18, 4.3% from 18 to 24, 31.5% from 25 to 44, 24.3% from 45 to 64, and 8.5% who were 65 years of age or older. The median age was 36 years. For every 100 females, there were 111.7 males. For every 100 females age 18 and over, there were 111.8 males.

The median income for a household in the township was $37,188, and the median income for a family was $44,000. Males had a median income of $28,846 versus $23,000 for females. The per capita income for the township was $16,456. About 9.0% of families and 9.4% of the population were below the poverty line, including 18.5% of those under the age of eighteen and 5.6% of those 65 or over.
