= Nereson Township, Roseau County, Minnesota =

Township in Minnesota, United States

Nereson Township, Minnesota
- Township
- Location of Nereson Township, within Roseau County, Minnesota
- Coordinates: 48°40′47″N 95°56′28″W
- Country: United States
- State: Minnesota
- County: Roseau

Area
  - Total: 36.3 sq mi (93.9 km^{2})
  - Land: 36.3 sq mi (93.9 km^{2})
  - Water: 0 sq mi (0.0 km^{2})
- Elevation: 1,125 ft (343 m)

Population (2020)
  - Total: 56
  - Density: 1.5/sq mi (0.60/km^{2})
- Time zone: UTC-6 (Central (CST))
  - Summer (DST): UTC-5 (CDT)
- FIPS code: 27-45178
- GNIS feature ID: 0665077

Nereson Township is a township in Roseau County, Minnesota, United States. The population was 56 at the 2020 census.

Nereson Township was named for Knut Neresen, a Norwegian settler.

== Geography ==
According to the United States Census Bureau, the township has a total area of 36.3 square miles (93.9 km^{2}), all land.

== Demographics ==
As of the census of 2000, there were 69 people, 29 households, and 20 families residing in the township. The population density was 1.9 people per square mile (0.7/km^{2}). There were 34 housing units at an average density of 0.9/sq mi (0.4/km^{2}). The racial makeup of the township was 100.00% White.

There were 29 households, out of which 27.6% had children under the age of 18 living with them, 69.0% were married couples living together, and 27.6% were non-families. 27.6% of all households were made up of individuals, and 6.9% had someone living alone who was 65 years of age or older. The average household size was 2.38 and the average family size was 2.90.

In the township the population was spread out, with 18.8% under the age of 18, 5.8% from 18 to 24, 30.4% from 25 to 44, 30.4% from 45 to 64, and 14.5% who were 65 years of age or older. The median age was 42 years. For every 100 females, there were 130.0 males. For every 100 females age 18 and over, there were 133.3 males.

The median income for a household in the township was $29,375, and the median income for a family was $50,833. Males had a median income of $23,000 versus $12,188 for females. The per capita income for the township was $13,899. There were no families and 2.3% of the population living below the poverty line, including no under eighteens and none of those over 64.
