= Soler Township, Roseau County, Minnesota =

Township in Minnesota, United States

Soler Township, Minnesota
- Township
- Location of Soler Township, within Roseau County, Minnesota
- Coordinates: 48°50′4″N 96°12′24″W
- Country: United States
- State: Minnesota
- County: Roseau

Area
  - Total: 36.4 sq mi (94.3 km^{2})
  - Land: 36.4 sq mi (94.3 km^{2})
  - Water: 0 sq mi (0.0 km^{2})
- Elevation: 1,030 ft (314 m)

Population (2020)
  - Total: 87
  - Density: 2.4/sq mi (0.92/km^{2})
- Time zone: UTC-6 (Central (CST))
  - Summer (DST): UTC-5 (CDT)
- FIPS code: 27-61096
- GNIS feature ID: 0665640

Soler Township is a township in Roseau County, Minnesota, United States. The population was 87 at the 2020 census.

Soler Township was named after Solør, in Norway.

== Geography ==
According to the United States Census Bureau, the township has a total area of 36.4 square miles (94.3 km^{2}), all land.

== Demographics ==
As of the census of 2000, there were 104 people, 39 households, and 28 families residing in the township. The population density was 2.9 people per square mile (1.1/km^{2}). There were 46 housing units at an average density of 1.3/sq mi (0.5/km^{2}). The racial makeup of the township was 96.15% White, 1.92% African American and 1.92% Native American. Hispanic or Latino of any race were 1.92% of the population.

There were 39 households, out of which 33.3% had children under the age of 18 living with them, 66.7% were married couples living together, 2.6% had a female householder with no husband present, and 28.2% were non-families. 23.1% of all households were made up of individuals, and 12.8% had someone living alone who was 65 years of age or older. The average household size was 2.67 and the average family size was 3.25.

In the township the population was spread out, with 26.0% under the age of 18, 9.6% from 18 to 24, 22.1% from 25 to 44, 29.8% from 45 to 64, and 12.5% who were 65 years of age or older. The median age was 39 years. For every 100 females, there were 153.7 males. For every 100 females age 18 and over, there were 126.5 males.

The median income for a household in the township was $42,000, and the median income for a family was $46,250. Males had a median income of $24,375 versus $23,438 for females. The per capita income for the township was $16,078. There were 2.9% of families and 5.1% of the population living below the poverty line, including no under eighteens and 18.8% of those over 64.
