= Polonia Township, Roseau County, Minnesota =

Township in Minnesota, United States

Polonia Township, Minnesota
- Township
- Location of Polonia Township, within Roseau County, Minnesota
- Coordinates: 48°46′6″N 96°19′42″W
- Country: United States
- State: Minnesota
- County: Roseau

Area
  - Total: 36.7 sq mi (95.1 km^{2})
  - Land: 36.7 sq mi (95.0 km^{2})
  - Water: 0.039 sq mi (0.1 km^{2})
- Elevation: 1,020 ft (310 m)

Population (2020)
  - Total: 26
  - Density: 0.71/sq mi (0.27/km^{2})
- Time zone: UTC-6 (Central (CST))
  - Summer (DST): UTC-5 (CDT)
- FIPS code: 27-51820
- GNIS feature ID: 0665332

Polonia Township is a township in Roseau County, Minnesota, United States. The population was 26 at the 2020 census.

Polonia Township was originally settled chiefly by Polish settlers, hence the name.

== Geography ==
According to the United States Census Bureau, the township has a total area of 36.7 square miles (95.1 km^{2}); 36.7 square miles (95.0 km^{2}) is land and 0.04 square mile (0.1 km^{2}) (0.08%) is water.

== Demographics ==
As of the census of 2000, there were 38 people, 14 households, and 11 families residing in the township. The population density was 1.0 people per square mile (0.4/km^{2}). There were 16 housing units at an average density of 0.4/sq mi (0.2/km^{2}). The racial makeup of the township was 94.74% White, 2.63% Asian, and 2.63% from two or more races.

There were 14 households, out of which 42.9% had children under the age of 18 living with them, 78.6% were married couples living together, and 21.4% were non-families. 21.4% of all households were made up of individuals, and 14.3% had someone living alone who was 65 years of age or older. The average household size was 2.71 and the average family size was 3.18.

In the township the population was spread out, with 31.6% under the age of 18, 2.6% from 18 to 24, 23.7% from 25 to 44, 15.8% from 45 to 64, and 26.3% who were 65 years of age or older. The median age was 41 years. For every 100 females, there were 153.3 males. For every 100 females age 18 and over, there were 116.7 males.

The median income for a household in the township was $35,000, and the median income for a family was $42,083. Males had a median income of $45,833 versus $28,750 for females. The per capita income for the township was $18,090. None of the population and none of the families were below the poverty line.
