= Barnett Township, Roseau County, Minnesota =

Township in Minnesota, United States

Barnett Township, Minnesota
- Township
- Location of Barnett Township, within Roseau County, Minnesota
- Coordinates: 48°40′50″N 96°2′57″W
- Country: United States
- State: Minnesota
- County: Roseau

Area
  - Total: 37.0 sq mi (95.9 km^{2})
  - Land: 37.0 sq mi (95.9 km^{2})
  - Water: 0 sq mi (0.0 km^{2})
- Elevation: 1,089 ft (332 m)

Population (2020)
  - Total: 137
  - Density: 3.70/sq mi (1.43/km^{2})
- Time zone: UTC-6 (Central (CST))
  - Summer (DST): UTC-5 (CDT)
- FIPS code: 27-03610
- GNIS feature ID: 0663508

Barnett Township is a township in Roseau County, Minnesota, United States. The population was 137 at the 2020 census.

Barnett Township was named for Myron E. Barnett, a pioneer settler.

== Geography ==
According to the United States Census Bureau, the township has a total area of 37.0 square miles (96 km^{2}), all land.

== Demographics ==
As of the census of 2000, there were 169 people, 62 households, and 51 families residing in the township. The population density was 4.6 people per square mile (1.8/km^{2}). There were 71 housing units at an average density of 1.9/sq mi (0.7/km^{2}). The racial makeup of the township was 99.41% White, and 0.59% from two or more races.

There were 62 households, out of which 32.3% had children under the age of 18 living with them, 64.5% were married couples living together, 6.5% had a female householder with no husband present, and 17.7% were non-families. 17.7% of all households were made up of individuals, and 8.1% had someone living alone who was 65 years of age or older. The average household size was 2.73 and the average family size was 3.06.

In the township the population was spread out, with 26.0% under the age of 18, 5.9% from 18 to 24, 25.4% from 25 to 44, 23.1% from 45 to 64, and 19.5% who were 65 years of age or older. The median age was 39 years. For every 100 females, there were 116.7 males. For every 100 females age 18 and over, there were 123.2 males.

The median income for a household in the township was $31,667, and the median income for a family was $32,083. Males had a median income of $29,375 versus $30,000 for females. The per capita income for the township was $13,255. About 20.0% of families and 24.4% of the population were below the poverty line, including 38.5% of those under the age of eighteen and none of those sixty five or over.
