= Cedarbend Township, Roseau County, Minnesota =

Township in Minnesota, United States

Cedarbend Township, Minnesota
- Township
- Location of Cedarbend Township, within Roseau County, Minnesota
- Coordinates: 48°50′32″N 95°24′25″W
- Country: United States
- State: Minnesota
- County: Roseau

Area
  - Total: 36.0 sq mi (93.3 km^{2})
  - Land: 36.0 sq mi (93.3 km^{2})
  - Water: 0 sq mi (0.0 km^{2})
- Elevation: 1,089 ft (332 m)

Population (2020)
  - Total: 157
  - Density: 4.36/sq mi (1.68/km^{2})
- Time zone: UTC-6 (Central (CST))
  - Summer (DST): UTC-5 (CDT)
- FIPS code: 27-10414
- GNIS feature ID: 0663766

Cedarbend Township is a township in Roseau County, Minnesota, United States. The population was 157 as per the 2020 census.

Cedarbend Township was named for the groves of white cedar within its borders.

== Geography ==
According to the United States Census Bureau, the township has a total area of 36.0 square miles (93 km^{2}), all land.

== Demographics ==
As of the census of 2000, there were 230 people, 82 households, and 61 families residing in the township. The population density was 6.4 inhabitants per square mile (2.5/km^{2}). There were 99 housing units at an average density of 2.7 per square mile (1.0/km^{2}). The racial makeup of the township was 97.83% White, 0.43% Native American, 0.87% from other races, and 0.87% from two or more races. Hispanic or Latino of any race were 0.87% of the population.

There were 82 households, out of which 41.5% had children under the age of 18 living with them, 62.2% were married couples living together, 4.9% had a female householder with no husband present, and 25.6% were non-families. 17.1% of all households were made up of individuals, and 3.7% had someone living alone who was 65 years of age or older. The average household size was 2.80 and the average family size was 3.23.

In the township the population was spread out, with 31.3% under the age of 18, 11.3% from 18 to 24, 31.3% from 25 to 44, 18.7% from 45 to 64, and 7.4% who were 65 years of age or older. The median age was 31 years. For every 100 females, there were 117.0 males. For every 100 females age 18 and over, there were 119.4 males.

The median income for a household in the township was $34,643, and the median income for a family was $33,750. Males had a median income of $28,125 versus $20,313 for females. The per capita income for the township was $15,654. About 3.7% of families and 4.1% of the population were below the poverty line, including 7.3% of those under the age of eighteen and none of those 65 or over.
