= Palmville Township, Roseau County, Minnesota =

Township in Minnesota, United States

Palmville Township, Minnesota
- Township
- Location of Palmville Township, within Roseau County, Minnesota
- Coordinates: 48°35′7″N 95°47′0″W
- Country: United States
- State: Minnesota
- County: Roseau

Area
  - Total: 35.8 sq mi (92.8 km^{2})
  - Land: 35.8 sq mi (92.7 km^{2})
  - Water: 0.039 sq mi (0.1 km^{2})
- Elevation: 1,145 ft (349 m)

Population (2020)
  - Total: 42
  - Density: 1.2/sq mi (0.45/km^{2})
- Time zone: UTC-6 (Central (CST))
  - Summer (DST): UTC-5 (CDT)
- FIPS code: 27-49588
- GNIS feature ID: 0665251

Palmville Township is a township in Roseau County, Minnesota, United States. The population was 42 at the 2020 census. The town was named for Louis Palm, a Swedish settler.

== Geography ==
According to the United States Census Bureau, the township has a total area of 35.8 square miles (92.8 km^{2}); 35.8 square miles (92.7 km^{2}) is land and 0.04 square miles (0.1 km^{2}) (0.08%) is water.

== Demographics ==
As of the census of 2000, there were 55 people, 19 households, and 14 families residing in the township. The population density was 1.5 people per square mile (0.6/km^{2}). There were 27 housing units at an average density of 0.8/sq mi (0.3/km^{2}). The racial makeup of the township was 94.55% White, 1.82% Asian, and 3.64% from two or more races.

There were 19 households, out of which 52.6% had children under the age of 18 living with them, 78.9% were married couples living together, and 21.1% were non-families. 21.1% of all households were made up of individuals, and 15.8% had someone living alone who was 65 years of age or older. The average household size was 2.89 and the average family size was 3.40.

In the township the population was spread out, with 30.9% under the age of 18, 7.3% from 18 to 24, 18.2% from 25 to 44, 27.3% from 45 to 64, and 16.4% who were 65 years of age or older. The median age was 43 years. For every 100 females, there were 129.2 males. For every 100 females age 18 and over, there were 123.5 males.

The median income for a household in the township was $40,000, and the median income for a family was $40,625. Males had a median income of $23,750 versus $38,750 for females. The per capita income for the township was $17,408. There were 20.0% of families and 10.4% of the population living below the poverty line, including 16.7% of under eighteens and none of those over 64.
