= Hereim Township, Roseau County, Minnesota =

Township in Minnesota, United States

Hereim Township, Minnesota
- Township
- Location of Hereim Township, within Roseau County, Minnesota
- Coordinates: 48°41′29″N 96°11′42″W
- Country: United States
- State: Minnesota
- County: Roseau

Area
  - Total: 33.2 sq mi (85.9 km^{2})
  - Land: 33.2 sq mi (85.9 km^{2})
  - Water: 0 sq mi (0.0 km^{2})
- Elevation: 1,066 ft (325 m)

Population (2020)
  - Total: 227
  - Density: 6.84/sq mi (2.64/km^{2})
- Time zone: UTC-6 (Central (CST))
  - Summer (DST): UTC-5 (CDT)
- FIPS code: 27-28628
- GNIS feature ID: 0664458

Hereim Township is a township in Roseau County, Minnesota, United States. The population was 227 at the 2020 census.

Hereim Township was named for Ole Hereim, a Norwegian settler.

== Geography ==
According to the United States Census Bureau, the township has a total area of 33.2 square miles (86 km^{2}), all land.

== Demographics ==
As of the census of 2000, there were 248 people, 99 households, and 76 families residing in the township. The population density was 7.5 inhabitants per square mile (2.9/km^{2}). There were 105 housing units at an average density of 3.2 per square mile (1.2/km^{2}). The racial makeup of the township was 97.98% White, 0.40% Native American, and 1.61% from two or more races.

There were 99 households, out of which 33.3% had children under the age of 18 living with them, 65.7% were married couples living together, 6.1% had a female householder with no husband present, and 23.2% were non-families. 18.2% of all households were made up of individuals, and 10.1% had someone living alone who was 65 years of age or older. The average household size was 2.51 and the average family size was 2.84.

In the township the population was spread out, with 25.4% under the age of 18, 5.6% from 18 to 24, 28.2% from 25 to 44, 27.4% from 45 to 64, and 13.3% who were 65 years of age or older. The median age was 40 years. For every 100 females, there were 103.3 males. For every 100 females age 18 and over, there were 103.3 males.

The median income for a household in the township was $38,750, and the median income for a family was $45,208. Males had a median income of $29,375 versus $23,333 for females. The per capita income for the township was $13,977. About 3.9% of families and 9.9% of the population were below the poverty line, including 10.0% of those under the age of eighteen and 42.9% of those 65 or over.
