= Spruce Township, Roseau County, Minnesota =

Township in Minnesota, United States

Spruce Township, Minnesota
- Township
- Location of Spruce Township, within Roseau County, Minnesota
- Coordinates: 48°50′27″N 95°41′29″W
- Country: United States
- State: Minnesota
- County: Roseau

Area
  - Total: 35.5 sq mi (92.0 km^{2})
  - Land: 35.5 sq mi (91.9 km^{2})
  - Water: 0.039 sq mi (0.1 km^{2})
- Elevation: 1,060 ft (323 m)

Population (2020)
  - Total: 582
  - Density: 16.4/sq mi (6.33/km^{2})
- Time zone: UTC-6 (Central (CST))
  - Summer (DST): UTC-5 (CDT)
- FIPS code: 27-62158
- GNIS feature ID: 0665684

Spruce Township is a township in Roseau County, Minnesota, United States. The population of the township was 582 at the 2020 census. The unincorporated community of Mandus is located within Spruce Township.

Spruce Township was named for groves of spruce trees within its borders.

== Geography ==
According to the United States Census Bureau, the township has a total area of 35.5 square miles (92.0 km^{2}); 35.5 square miles (91.9 km^{2}) is land and 0.1 square mile (0.1 km^{2}) (0.14%) is water.

== Demographics ==
As of the census of 2000, there were 614 people, 222 households, and 180 families residing in the township. The population density was 17.3 people per square mile (6.7/km^{2}). There were 235 housing units at an average density of 6.6/sq mi (2.6/km^{2}). The racial makeup of the township was 98.05% White, 0.16% African American, 0.81% Asian, and 0.98% from two or more races. Hispanic or Latino of any race were 0.16% of the population.

There were 222 households, out of which 45.0% had children under the age of 18 living with them, 71.2% were married couples living together, 4.5% had a female householder with no husband present, and 18.9% were non-families. 17.1% of all households were made up of individuals, and 7.7% had someone living alone who was 65 years of age or older. The average household size was 2.77 and the average family size was 3.13.

In the township the population was spread out, with 32.4% under the age of 18, 4.4% from 18 to 24, 27.4% from 25 to 44, 24.9% from 45 to 64, and 10.9% who were 65 years of age or older. The median age was 38 years. For every 100 females, there were 106.7 males. For every 100 females age 18 and over, there were 113.9 males.

The median income for a household in the township was $46,875, and the median income for a family was $51,667. Males had a median income of $34,306 versus $26,518 for females. The per capita income for the township was $19,985. About 2.4% of families and 3.4% of the population were below the poverty line, including 3.4% of those under age 18 and 6.1% of those age 65 or over.
