= Roseau County, Minnesota =

County in Minnesota, United States

- County
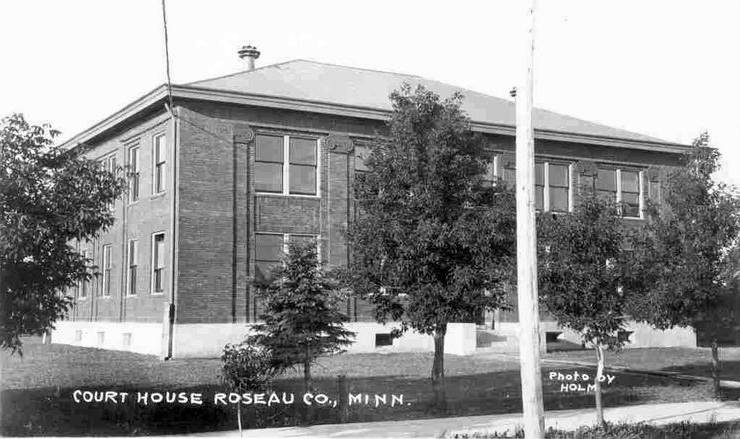
- Postcard of the Roseau County Courthouse

- Location within the U.S. state of Minnesota
- Coordinates: 48°46′N 95°48′W
- Country: United States
- State: Minnesota
- Founded: December 31, 1894
- Named for: Roseau River
- Seat: Roseau
- Largest city: Roseau

Area
  - Total: 1,678 sq mi (4,350 km^{2})
  - Land: 1,672 sq mi (4,330 km^{2})
  - Water: 6.5 sq mi (17 km^{2}) 0.4%

Population (2020)
  - Total: 15,331
  - Estimate (2025): 15,246 ▼
  - Density: 9.2/sq mi (3.6/km^{2})
- Time zone: UTC−6 (Central)
  - Summer (DST): UTC−5 (CDT)
- Congressional district: 7th
- Website: www.roseaucountymn.gov

Roseau County (/roʊˈzoʊ/) is a county in the northwestern part of the U.S. state of Minnesota, along the Canada–U.S. border. As of the 2020 census, the population was 15,331. Its county seat is Roseau. Roseau County borders the Canadian province of Manitoba.

The Red Lake Indian Reservation is partially in Roseau County.

== History ==
Roseau County was once the home of many Ojibwe, Sioux, and Mandan tribes. Archeologists have found artifacts within the county belonging to these tribes that date back 7,200 years. More recent history includes fur trappers and European-based explorers. By 1822, a fur-trading post was established in the area. In 1885, the future Roseau City hosted four settlers; by 1895 there were 600, and the area was incorporated as Roseau.

By the mid-1880s the early settlers of eastern Kittson County were feeling the disadvantage of their location, far from the county seat, and petitioned the government for a separate county. On December 31, 1894, Governor Knute Nelson proclaimed the eastern portion of Kittson a new county, to be named Roseau. On February 11, 1896, the next governor, David Marston Clough, added part of Beltrami County to Roseau County. Roseau was named the county seat.

Until May 1965, when county option was eliminated, Roseau County was a dry county; no beverages with over 3.2% alcohol could be sold.

== Geography ==
Soils of Roseau County

Roseau County is in far northern Minnesota. Its northern boundary abuts Canada. The Roseau River drains the upper part of the county, flowing west into Kittson County on its way to the Hudson Bay. The county terrain consists of low rolling hills, devoted to agriculture, and dotted with lakes and drainages. There is considerable wooded area, especially in the southeast portion. The county has an area of 1,678 square miles (4,350 km^{2}), of which 1,672 square miles (4,330 km^{2}) is land and 6.5 square miles (17 km^{2}) (0.4%) is water. Roseau is one of 17 Minnesota savanna counties with more savanna soils than prairie or forest soils.

== Transportation ==
=== Airports ===
- Warroad International Memorial Airport (KRRT) - two miles northwest of Warroad
- Piney Pinecreek Border Airport - extends into Canada; serves as a limited airport of entry between the two nations.
- Roseau Municipal Airport - 2 miles east of Roseau

=== Major highways ===
- Minnesota State Highway 11
- Minnesota State Highway 32
- Minnesota State Highway 89
- Minnesota State Highway 308
- Minnesota State Highway 310
- Minnesota State Highway 313

=== Adjacent counties and rural municipalities ===
- Rural Municipality of Stuartburn, Manitoba - northwest
- Rural Municipality of Piney, Manitoba - north
- Buffalo Point First Nation, Manitoba - northeast
- Lake of the Woods County - east
- Beltrami County - southeast
- Marshall County - south
- Kittson County - west

=== Protected areas ===
- Beltrami Island State Forest
- Hayes Lake State Park
- Lost River State Forest
- Luxemburg Peatland Scientific and Natural Area
- Roseau River State Wildlife Management Area
- Sprague Creek Peatland Scientific and Natural Area
- Two Rivers Aspen Park Scientific and Natural Area

== Demographics ==
Historical population
| Census | Pop. | Note | %± |
|---|---|---|---|
| 1900 | 6,994 | | — |
| 1910 | 11,338 | | 62.1% |
| 1920 | 13,305 | | 17.3% |
| 1930 | 12,621 | | −5.1% |
| 1940 | 15,103 | | 19.7% |
| 1950 | 14,505 | | −4.0% |
| 1960 | 12,154 | | −16.2% |
| 1970 | 11,569 | | −4.8% |
| 1980 | 12,574 | | 8.7% |
| 1990 | 15,026 | | 19.5% |
| 2000 | 16,338 | | 8.7% |
| 2010 | 15,629 | | −4.3% |
| 2020 | 15,331 | | −1.9% |
| 2025 (est.) | 15,246 | ▼ | −0.6% |
U.S. Decennial Census; 1790-1960 1900-1990; 1990-2000 2010-2020

=== Racial and ethnic composition ===
Roseau County, Minnesota – Racial and ethnic composition Note: the US Census treats Hispanic/Latino as an ethnic category. This table excludes Latinos from the racial categories and assigns them to a separate category. Hispanics/Latinos may be of any race.
| Race / Ethnicity (NH = Non-Hispanic) | Pop 1980 | Pop 1990 | Pop 2000 | Pop 2010 | Pop 2020 | % 1980 | % 1990 | % 2000 | % 2010 | % 2020 |
|---|---|---|---|---|---|---|---|---|---|---|
| White alone (NH) | 12,431 | 14,755 | 15,625 | 14,696 | 13,700 | 98.86% | 98.20% | 95.64% | 94.03% | 89.36% |
| Black or African American alone (NH) | 1 | 4 | 20 | 37 | 85 | 0.01% | 0.03% | 0.12% | 0.24% | 0.55% |
| Native American or Alaska Native alone (NH) | 86 | 146 | 224 | 199 | 229 | 0.68% | 0.97% | 1.37% | 1.27% | 1.49% |
| Asian alone (NH) | 18 | 94 | 279 | 385 | 398 | 0.14% | 0.63% | 1.71% | 2.46% | 2.60% |
| Native Hawaiian or Pacific Islander alone (NH) | x | x | 3 | 3 | 10 | x | x | 0.02% | 0.02% | 0.07% |
| Other race alone (NH) | 16 | 1 | 4 | 3 | 56 | 0.13% | 0.01% | 0.02% | 0.02% | 0.37% |
| Mixed race or Multiracial (NH) | x | x | 112 | 190 | 615 | x | x | 0.69% | 1.22% | 4.01% |
| Hispanic or Latino (any race) | 22 | 26 | 71 | 116 | 238 | 0.17% | 0.17% | 0.43% | 0.74% | 1.55% |
| Total | 12,574 | 15,026 | 16,338 | 15,629 | 15,331 | 100.00% | 100.00% | 100.00% | 100.00% | 100.00% |

=== 2020 census ===
As of the 2020 census, the county had a population of 15,331. The median age was 42.6 years. 23.9% of residents were under the age of 18 and 18.7% of residents were 65 years of age or older. For every 100 females there were 107.0 males, and for every 100 females age 18 and over there were 106.4 males age 18 and over.

The racial makeup of the county was 89.8% White, 0.6% Black or African American, 1.6% American Indian and Alaska Native, 2.6% Asian, 0.1% Native Hawaiian and Pacific Islander, 0.8% from some other race, and 4.6% from two or more races. Hispanic or Latino residents of any race comprised 1.6% of the population.

<0.1% of residents lived in urban areas, while 100.0% lived in rural areas.

There were 6,340 households in the county, of which 28.2% had children under the age of 18 living in them. Of all households, 51.9% were married-couple households, 21.8% were households with a male householder and no spouse or partner present, and 19.7% were households with a female householder and no spouse or partner present. About 30.0% of all households were made up of individuals and 12.2% had someone living alone who was 65 years of age or older.

There were 7,137 housing units, of which 11.2% were vacant. Among occupied housing units, 79.5% were owner-occupied and 20.5% were renter-occupied. The homeowner vacancy rate was 1.4% and the rental vacancy rate was 12.0%.

=== 2000 census ===
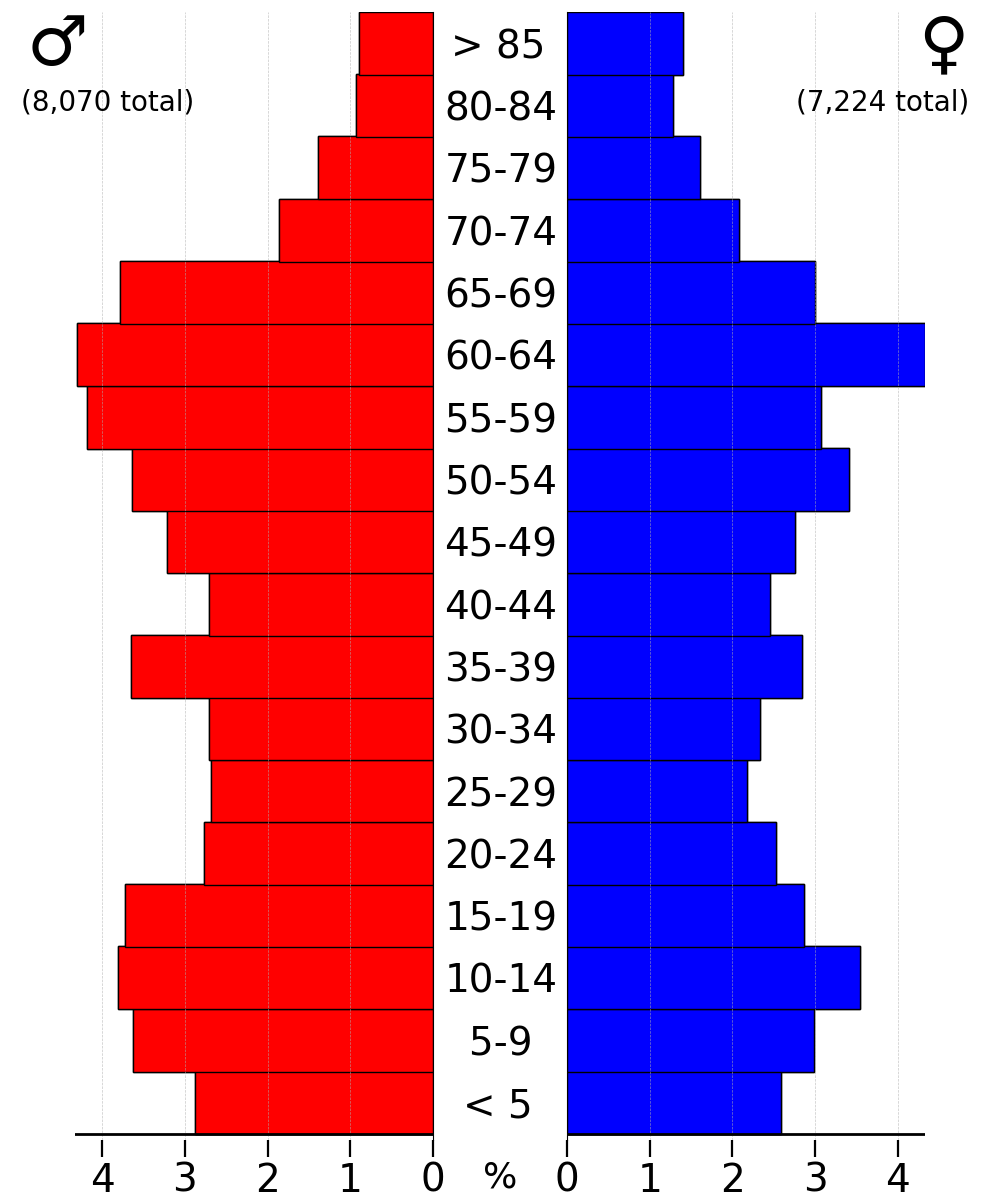
2022 U.S. census population pyramid for Roseau County, from ACS 5-year estimates

As of the census of 2000, there were 16,338 people, 6,190 households, and 4,438 families in the county. The population density was 9.77 per square mile (3.77/km^{2}). There were 7,101 housing units at an average density of 4.25 per square mile (1.64/km^{2}). The racial makeup of the county was 95.92% White, 0.13% Black or African American, 1.42% Native American, 1.73% Asian, 0.02% Pacific Islander, 0.08% from other races, and 0.70% from two or more races. 0.43% of the population were Hispanic or Latino of any race. 41.0% were of Norwegian, 18.8% German and 10.7% Swedish ancestry.

There were 6,190 households, out of which 38.40% had children under the age of 18 living with them, 60.00% were married couples living together, 6.80% had a female householder with no husband present, and 28.30% were non-families. 24.60% of all households were made up of individuals, and 9.90% had someone living alone who was 65 years of age or older. The average household size was 2.60 and the average family size was 3.11.

The county population contained 29.80% under the age of 18, 6.80% from 18 to 24, 29.90% from 25 to 44, 20.80% from 45 to 64, and 12.60% who were 65 years of age or older. The median age was 35 years. For every 100 females there were 105.00 males. For every 100 females age 18 and over, there were 104.00 males.

The median income for a household in the county was $39,852, and the median income for a family was $46,185. Males had a median income of $29,747 versus $23,630 for females. The per capita income for the county was $17,053. About 4.60% of families and 6.60% of the population were below the poverty line, including 6.50% of those under age 18 and 12.20% of those age 65 or over.

== Government and politics ==
In presidential elections, Roseau is Minnesota's most reliably Republican-voting county. John McCain's and George W. Bush's best performances in Minnesota were in Roseau County. Bush won it twice, with over 65% of the vote. It was also one of the few Minnesota counties that George H. W. Bush won in 1992 and Bob Dole won in 1996.

Roseau County is less reliably Republican in senatorial and gubernatorial elections. The Minnesota Democratic–Farmer–Labor Party has won two senatorial elections here since 1992. Independents do not perform as well in Roseau County as in the rest of Minnesota. In the 1998 gubernatorial election, Norm Coleman's best performance in Minnesota was in Roseau County, where he won with almost 50% of the vote.

United States presidential election results for Roseau County, Minnesota
| Year | Republican | | Democratic | | Third party(ies) | |
| Year | No. | % | No. | % | No. | % |
|---|---|---|---|---|---|---|
| 1896 | 287 | 34.66% | 527 | 63.65% | 14 | 1.69% |
| 1900 | 632 | 53.02% | 537 | 45.05% | 23 | 1.93% |
| 1904 | 1,042 | 73.38% | 182 | 12.82% | 196 | 13.80% |
| 1908 | 900 | 50.90% | 444 | 25.11% | 424 | 23.98% |
| 1912 | 278 | 14.49% | 299 | 15.59% | 1,341 | 69.92% |
| 1916 | 821 | 38.71% | 834 | 39.32% | 466 | 21.97% |
| 1920 | 2,387 | 64.13% | 500 | 13.43% | 835 | 22.43% |
| 1924 | 1,300 | 38.99% | 148 | 4.44% | 1,886 | 56.57% |
| 1928 | 2,618 | 63.16% | 1,342 | 32.38% | 185 | 4.46% |
| 1932 | 1,078 | 25.52% | 2,805 | 66.41% | 341 | 8.07% |
| 1936 | 1,326 | 25.18% | 3,761 | 71.42% | 179 | 3.40% |
| 1940 | 1,730 | 28.25% | 4,289 | 70.05% | 104 | 1.70% |
| 1944 | 1,513 | 28.82% | 3,697 | 70.42% | 40 | 0.76% |
| 1948 | 1,458 | 26.37% | 3,674 | 66.46% | 396 | 7.16% |
| 1952 | 2,596 | 45.33% | 3,062 | 53.47% | 69 | 1.20% |
| 1956 | 1,901 | 38.23% | 3,062 | 61.57% | 10 | 0.20% |
| 1960 | 2,274 | 41.48% | 3,198 | 58.34% | 10 | 0.18% |
| 1964 | 1,651 | 31.19% | 3,636 | 68.69% | 6 | 0.11% |
| 1968 | 2,048 | 40.68% | 2,649 | 52.61% | 338 | 6.71% |
| 1972 | 2,844 | 53.22% | 2,396 | 44.84% | 104 | 1.95% |
| 1976 | 2,382 | 41.41% | 3,215 | 55.89% | 155 | 2.69% |
| 1980 | 3,358 | 53.16% | 2,616 | 41.41% | 343 | 5.43% |
| 1984 | 3,445 | 59.28% | 2,319 | 39.91% | 47 | 0.81% |
| 1988 | 3,500 | 56.52% | 2,630 | 42.47% | 62 | 1.00% |
| 1992 | 2,785 | 38.31% | 2,346 | 32.27% | 2,138 | 29.41% |
| 1996 | 2,988 | 43.25% | 2,759 | 39.93% | 1,162 | 16.82% |
| 2000 | 4,695 | 65.52% | 2,128 | 29.70% | 343 | 4.79% |
| 2004 | 5,355 | 67.69% | 2,442 | 30.87% | 114 | 1.44% |
| 2008 | 4,438 | 57.64% | 3,097 | 40.22% | 165 | 2.14% |
| 2012 | 4,409 | 59.97% | 2,772 | 37.70% | 171 | 2.33% |
| 2016 | 5,451 | 69.85% | 1,856 | 23.78% | 497 | 6.37% |
| 2020 | 6,065 | 72.02% | 2,188 | 25.98% | 168 | 2.00% |
| 2024 | 6,279 | 73.88% | 2,093 | 24.63% | 127 | 1.49% |

County Board of Commissioners
| Position | Name | District | Next Election |
|---|---|---|---|
| Commissioner | Glenda Phillipe | District 1 | 2026 |
| Commissioner | Jack Swanson | District 2 | 2024 |
| Commissioner and Chairperson | Levi Novacek | District 3 | 2024 |
| Commissioner | Russell Walker | District 4 | 2024 |
| Commissioner | Daryl Wicklund | District 5 | 2026 |

State Legislature (2025–2027)
| Position | Name | Affiliation | District |
|---|---|---|---|
| Senate | Mark Johnson | Republican | District 1 |
| House of Representatives | John Burkel | Republican | District 1A |

U.S Congress (2025–2027)
| Position | Name | Affiliation | District |
|---|---|---|---|
| House of Representatives | Michelle Fischbach | Republican | 7th |
| Senate | Amy Klobuchar | Democrat | N/A |
| Senate | Tina Smith | Democrat | N/A |

== Communities ==
=== Cities ===
- Badger
- Greenbush
- Roosevelt (part)
- Roseau (county seat)
- Strathcona
- Warroad

=== Unincorporated communities ===
- Fox
- Mandus
- Pelan (part)
- Pencer
- Pinecreek
- Ross
- Salol
- Skime
- Swift
- Wannaska

=== Ghost towns ===
- Haug
- Winner

Townships and unorganized territories of Roseau County

=== Townships ===
- Barnett Township
- Barto Township
- Beaver Township
- Cedarbend Township
- Deer Township
- Dewey Township
- Dieter Township
- Enstrom Township
- Falun Township
- Golden Valley Township
- Grimstad Township
- Hereim Township
- Huss Township
- Jadis Township
- Lake Township
- Laona Township
- Lind Township
- Malung Township
- Mickinock Township
- Moose Township
- Moranville Township
- Nereson Township
- Palmville Township
- Pohlitz Township
- Polonia Township
- Poplar Grove Township
- Reine Township
- Ross Township
- Skagen Township
- Soler Township
- Spruce Township
- Stafford Township
- Stokes Township

=== Unorganized territories ===
- North Roseau
- Northwest Roseau
- Southeast Roseau

== See also ==
- National Register of Historic Places listings in Roseau County, Minnesota
