= Barto Township, Roseau County, Minnesota =

Township in Minnesota, United States

Barto Township, Minnesota
- Township
- Location of Barto Township, within Roseau County, Minnesota
- Coordinates: 48°45′14″N 96°11′42″W
- Country: United States
- State: Minnesota
- County: Roseau

Area
  - Total: 36.9 sq mi (95.5 km^{2})
  - Land: 36.9 sq mi (95.5 km^{2})
  - Water: 0 sq mi (0.0 km^{2})
- Elevation: 1,030 ft (314 m)

Population (2020)
  - Total: 116
  - Density: 3.15/sq mi (1.21/km^{2})
- Time zone: UTC-6 (Central (CST))
  - Summer (DST): UTC-5 (CDT)
- FIPS code: 27-03808
- GNIS feature ID: 0663516

Barto Township is a township in Roseau County, Minnesota, United States. The population was 116 at the 2020 census.

Barto Township was named for an immigrant settler from Bohemia.

== Geography ==
According to the United States Census Bureau, the township has a total area of 36.9 square miles (96 km^{2}), all land.

== Demographics ==
As of the census of 2000, there were 142 people, 51 households, and 44 families residing in the township. The population density was 3.9 people per square mile (1.5/km^{2}). There were 53 housing units at an average density of 1.4/sq mi (0.6/km^{2}). The racial makeup of the township was 100.00% White.

There were 51 households, out of which 37.3% had children under the age of 18 living with them, 80.4% were married couples living together, 2.0% had a female householder with no husband present, and 13.7% were non-families. 11.8% of all households were made up of individuals, and 7.8% had someone living alone who was 65 years of age or older. The average household size was 2.78 and the average family size was 3.05.

In the township the population was spread out, with 26.1% under the age of 18, 7.0% from 18 to 24, 31.7% from 25 to 44, 21.1% from 45 to 64, and 14.1% who were 65 years of age or older. The median age was 35 years. For every 100 females, there were 121.9 males. For every 100 females age 18 and over, there were 118.8 males.

The median income for a household in the township was $46,875, and the median income for a family was $48,333. Males had a median income of $29,688 versus $17,031 for females. The per capita income for the township was $20,125. None of the population and none of the families were below the poverty line.
