= Lake Township, Roseau County, Minnesota =

Township in Minnesota, United States

Lake Township, Minnesota
- Township
- Location of Lake Township, within Roseau County, Minnesota
- Coordinates: 48°55′12″N 95°21′49″W
- Country: United States
- State: Minnesota
- County: Roseau

Area
  - Total: 58.1 sq mi (150.6 km^{2})
  - Land: 57.8 sq mi (149.6 km^{2})
  - Water: 0.39 sq mi (1.0 km^{2})
- Elevation: 1,080 ft (330 m)

Population (2020)
  - Total: 1,980
  - Density: 34.3/sq mi (13.2/km^{2})
- Time zone: UTC-6 (Central (CST))
  - Summer (DST): UTC-5 (CDT)
- FIPS code: 27-34010
- GNIS feature ID: 0664658

Lake Township is a township in Roseau County, Minnesota, United States. The population was 1,980 at the 2020 census. This township was originally called Algoma Township, which bears a name of Indian derivation, "formed by Schoolcraft from Algonquin and goma meaning 'Algonquin waters.' It designates a large district in Canada, bordering Lakes Huron and Superior. The name was changed sometime between 1954 and 1965.

== Geography ==
According to the United States Census Bureau, the township has a total area of 58.2 square miles (151 km^{2}), of which 57.8 square miles (150 km^{2}) is land and 0.4 square miles (1.0 km^{2}) (0.67%) is water. The township includes the United States exclave of Elm Point.

== Demographics ==
As of the census of 2000, there were 2,087 people, 736 households, and 560 families residing in the township. The population density was 36.1 inhabitants per square mile (13.9/km^{2}). There were 982 housing units at an average density of 17.0 per square mile (6.6/km^{2}). The racial makeup of the township was 92.43% White, 0.05% African American, 2.44% Native American, 4.07% Asian, and 1.01% from two or more races. Hispanic or Latino of any race were 0.10% of the population.

There were 736 households, out of which 45.7% had children under the age of 18 living with them, 62.8% were married couples living together, 8.0% had a female householder with no husband present, and 23.9% were non-families. 18.3% of all households were made up of individuals, and 3.7% had someone living alone who was 65 years of age or older. The average household size was 2.84 and the average family size was 3.24.

In the township the population was spread out, with 33.4% under the age of 18, 8.0% from 18 to 24, 32.7% from 25 to 44, 19.8% from 45 to 64, and 6.0% who were 65 years of age or older. The median age was 31 years. For every 100 females, there were 110.0 males. For every 100 females age 18 and over, there were 108.4 males.

The median income for a household in the township was $44,034, and the median income for a family was $46,509. Males had a median income of $28,038 versus $24,075 for females. The per capita income of the township was $16,549. About 3.1% of families and 4.5% of the population were below the poverty line, including 4.4% of those under age 18 and 10.2% of those age 65 or over.
