= Deer Township, Roseau County, Minnesota =

Township in Minnesota, United States

Deer Township, Minnesota
- Township
- Location of Deer Township, within Roseau County, Minnesota
- Coordinates: 48°34′51″N 96°10′53″W
- Country: United States
- State: Minnesota
- County: Roseau

Area
  - Total: 36.1 sq mi (93.6 km^{2})
  - Land: 36.1 sq mi (93.6 km^{2})
  - Water: 0 sq mi (0.0 km^{2})
- Elevation: 1,102 ft (336 m)

Population (2020)
  - Total: 109
  - Density: 3.02/sq mi (1.16/km^{2})
- Time zone: UTC-6 (Central (CST))
  - Summer (DST): UTC-5 (CDT)
- FIPS code: 27-15166
- GNIS feature ID: 0663940

Deer Township is a township in Roseau County, Minnesota, United States. The population was 109 at the 2020 census.

Deer Township was named for the fact deer were commonly hunted there.

== Geography ==
According to the United States Census Bureau, the township has a total area of 36.2 square miles (94 km^{2}), all land.

== Demographics ==
As of the census of 2000, there were 92 people, 38 households, and 28 families residing in the township. The population density was 2.5 inhabitants per square mile (0.97/km^{2}). There were 53 housing units at an average density of 1.5 per square mile (0.58/km^{2}). The racial makeup of the township was 97.83% White, 1.09% Asian, and 1.09% from two or more races.

There were 38 households, out of which 26.3% had children under the age of 18 living with them, 71.1% were married couples living together, 2.6% had a female householder with no husband present, and 26.3% were non-families. 23.7% of all households were made up of individuals, and 10.5% had someone living alone who was 65 years of age or older. The average household size was 2.42 and the average family size was 2.89.

In the township the population was spread out, with 21.7% under the age of 18, 9.8% from 18 to 24, 18.5% from 25 to 44, 31.5% from 45 to 64, and 18.5% who were 65 years of age or older. The median age was 45 years. For every 100 females, there were 114.0 males. For every 100 females age 18 and over, there were 111.8 males.

The median income for a household in the township was $36,875, and the median income for a family was $45,417. Males had a median income of $26,071 versus $20,000 for females. The per capita income for the township was $14,301. There were no families and 2.5% of the population living below the poverty line, including no under eighteens and none of those over 64.
