= Jadis Township, Roseau County, Minnesota =

Township in Minnesota, United States

Jadis Township, Minnesota
- Township
- Location of Jadis Township, within Roseau County, Minnesota
- Coordinates: 48°52′11″N 95°47′44″W
- Country: United States
- State: Minnesota
- County: Roseau

Area
  - Total: 49.7 sq mi (128.6 km^{2})
  - Land: 49.7 sq mi (128.6 km^{2})
  - Water: 0 sq mi (0.0 km^{2})
- Elevation: 1,040 ft (317 m)

Population (2020)
  - Total: 624
  - Density: 12.6/sq mi (4.85/km^{2})
- Time zone: UTC-6 (Central (CST))
  - Summer (DST): UTC-5 (CDT)
- ZIP code: 56751
- Area code: 218
- FIPS code: 27-31634
- GNIS feature ID: 0664570

Jadis Township is a township in Roseau County, Minnesota, United States. The population was 624 at the 2020 census.

Jadis Township was named for Edward W. Jadis, a businessperson in the lumber industry.

== Geography ==
According to the United States Census Bureau, the township has a total area of 49.6 square miles (128 km^{2}), all land.

== Demographics ==
As of the census of 2000, there were 564 people, 203 households, and 163 families residing in the township. The population density was 11.4 inhabitants per square mile (4.4/km^{2}). There were 216 housing units at an average density of 4.4 per square mile (1.7/km^{2}). The racial makeup of the township was 98.94% White, 0.18% Asian, 0.35% Pacific Islander, and 0.53% from two or more races. Hispanic or Latino of any race were 0.71% of the population.

There were 203 households, out of which 39.9% had children under the age of 18 living with them, 68.0% were married couples living together, 7.4% had a female householder with no husband present, and 19.7% were non-families. 15.3% of all households were made up of individuals, and 3.9% had someone living alone who was 65 years of age or older. The average household size was 2.78 and the average family size was 3.04.

In the township the population was spread out, with 31.0% under the age of 18, 4.4% from 18 to 24, 28.9% from 25 to 44, 24.1% from 45 to 64, and 11.5% who were 65 years of age or older. The median age was 35 years. For every 100 females, there were 102.9 males. For every 100 females age 18 and over, there were 111.4 males.

The median income for a household in the township was $49,000, and the median income for a family was $49,167. Males had a median income of $32,500 versus $26,118 for females. The per capita income for the township was $19,434. About 1.2% of families and 1.1% of the population were below the poverty line, including none of those under the age of eighteen or sixty-five or over.
