= Stokes Township, Roseau County, Minnesota =

Township in Minnesota, United States

Stokes Township, Minnesota
- Township
- Location of Stokes Township, within Roseau County, Minnesota
- Coordinates: 48°46′6″N 95°57′13″W
- Country: United States
- State: Minnesota
- County: Roseau

Area
  - Total: 36.0 sq mi (93.3 km^{2})
  - Land: 36.0 sq mi (93.3 km^{2})
  - Water: 0 sq mi (0.0 km^{2})
- Elevation: 1,096 ft (334 m)

Population (2020)
  - Total: 219
  - Density: 6.08/sq mi (2.35/km^{2})
- Time zone: UTC-6 (Central (CST))
  - Summer (DST): UTC-5 (CDT)
- FIPS code: 27-62932
- GNIS feature ID: 0665716

Stokes Township is a township in Roseau County, Minnesota, United States. The population was 219 at the 2020 census.

Stokes Township bears the name of George Stokes, an early settler.

== Geography ==
According to the United States Census Bureau, the township has a total area of 36.0 square miles (93.3 km^{2}), all land.

== Demographics ==
As of the census of 2000, there were 229 people, 82 households, and 66 families residing in the township. The population density was 6.4 people per square mile (2.5/km^{2}). There were 88 housing units at an average density of 2.4/sq mi (0.9/km^{2}). The racial makeup of the township was 99.13% White, 0.44% from other races, and 0.44% from two or more races. Hispanic or Latino of any race were 1.31% of the population.

There were 82 households, out of which 45.1% had children under the age of 18 living with them, 67.1% were married couples living together, 8.5% had a female householder with no husband present, and 18.3% were non-families. 17.1% of all households were made up of individuals, and 9.8% had someone living alone who was 65 years of age or older. The average household size was 2.79 and the average family size was 3.03.

In the township the population was spread out, with 31.4% under the age of 18, 5.2% from 18 to 24, 31.9% from 25 to 44, 23.6% from 45 to 64, and 7.9% who were 65 years of age or older. The median age was 35 years. For every 100 females, there were 112.0 males. For every 100 females age 18 and over, there were 121.1 males.

The median income for a household in the township was $39,531, and the median income for a family was $40,313. Males had a median income of $27,708 versus $21,250 for females. The per capita income for the township was $17,653. About 4.5% of families and 9.6% of the population were below the poverty line, including 11.8% of those under the age of eighteen and 16.7% of those 65 or over.
