= Huss Township, Roseau County, Minnesota =

Township in Minnesota, United States

Huss Township, Minnesota
- Township
- Location of Huss Township, within Roseau County, Minnesota
- Coordinates: 48°35′14″N 96°4′12″W
- Country: United States
- State: Minnesota
- County: Roseau

Area
  - Total: 36.4 sq mi (94.4 km^{2})
  - Land: 36.4 sq mi (94.4 km^{2})
  - Water: 0 sq mi (0.0 km^{2})
- Elevation: 1,155 ft (352 m)

Population (2020)
  - Total: 106
  - Density: 2.91/sq mi (1.12/km^{2})
- Time zone: UTC-6 (Central (CST))
  - Summer (DST): UTC-5 (CDT)
- FIPS code: 27-30626
- GNIS feature ID: 0664535

Huss Township is a township in Roseau County, Minnesota, United States. The population was 106 at the 2020 census.

Huss Township was named for John Huss (14th century–1415), a Czech Catholic priest, philosopher, reformer, and master at Charles University in Prague.

== Geography ==
According to the United States Census Bureau, the township has a total area of 36.4 square miles (94 km^{2}), of which 36.4 square miles (94 km^{2}) is land and 0.03% is water.

== Demographics ==
As of the census of 2000, there were 145 people, 57 households, and 36 families residing in the township. The population density was 4.0 inhabitants per square mile (1.5/km^{2}). There were 66 housing units at an average density of 1.8 per square mile (0.69/km^{2}). The racial makeup of the township was 100.00% White.

There were 57 households, out of which 35.1% had children under the age of 18 living with them, 57.9% were married couples living together, 5.3% had a female householder with no husband present, and 36.8% were non-families. 35.1% of all households were made up of individuals, and 15.8% had someone living alone who was 65 years of age or older. The average household size was 2.54 and the average family size was 3.42.

In the township the population was spread out, with 30.3% under the age of 18, 6.2% from 18 to 24, 25.5% from 25 to 44, 22.8% from 45 to 64, and 15.2% who were 65 years of age or older. The median age was 38 years. For every 100 females, there were 110.1 males. For every 100 females age 18 and over, there were 119.6 males.

The median income for a household in the township was $21,458, and the median income for a family was $38,750. Males had a median income of $33,750 versus $20,625 for females. The per capita income for the township was $12,248. There were 17.6% of families and 19.1% of the population living below the poverty line, including 14.9% of under eighteens and 33.3% of those over 64.
