= Stafford Township, Roseau County, Minnesota =

Township in Minnesota, United States

Stafford Township, Minnesota
- Township
- Location of Stafford Township, within Roseau County, Minnesota
- Coordinates: 48°45′14″N 95°47′58″W
- Country: United States
- State: Minnesota
- County: Roseau

Area
  - Total: 36.1 sq mi (93.4 km^{2})
  - Land: 36.1 sq mi (93.4 km^{2})
  - Water: 0 sq mi (0.0 km^{2})
- Elevation: 1,096 ft (334 m)

Population (2020)
  - Total: 269
  - Density: 7.46/sq mi (2.88/km^{2})
- Time zone: UTC-6 (Central (CST))
  - Summer (DST): UTC-5 (CDT)
- FIPS code: 27-62338
- GNIS feature ID: 0665691

Stafford Township is a township in Roseau County, Minnesota, United States. The population was 269 at the 2020 census.

Stafford Township bears the name of William Stafford, an early settler.

== Geography ==
According to the United States Census Bureau, the township has a total area of 36.0 square miles (93.4 km^{2}), all of it land.

== Demographics ==
As of the census of 2000, there were 297 people, 107 households, and 83 families residing in the township. The population density was 8.2 people per square mile (3.2/km^{2}). There were 112 housing units at an average density of 3.1/sq mi (1.2/km^{2}). The racial makeup of the township was 98.65% White, 0.34% from other races, and 1.01% from two or more races. Hispanic or Latino of any race were 0.34% of the population.

There were 107 households, out of which 44.9% had children under the age of 18 living with them, 72.9% were married couples living together, 0.9% had a female householder with no husband present, and 22.4% were non-families. 18.7% of all households were made up of individuals, and 6.5% had someone living alone who was 65 years of age or older. The average household size was 2.78 and the average family size was 3.22.

In the township the population was spread out, with 31.3% under the age of 18, 5.1% from 18 to 24, 36.7% from 25 to 44, 17.2% from 45 to 64, and 9.8% who were 65 years of age or older. The median age was 32 years. For every 100 females, there were 112.1 males. For every 100 females age 18 and over, there were 121.7 males.

The median income for a household in the township was $51,071, and the median income for a family was $57,292. Males had a median income of $37,250 versus $22,500 for females. The per capita income for the township was $19,200. About 7.8% of families and 7.4% of the population were below the poverty line, including 6.4% of those under the age of eighteen and 22.2% of those 65 or over.
