= Dewey Township, Roseau County, Minnesota =

Township in Minnesota, United States

Dewey Township, Minnesota
- Township
- Location of Dewey Township, within Roseau County, Minnesota
- Coordinates: 48°40′21″N 96°20′0″W
- Country: United States
- State: Minnesota
- County: Roseau

Area
  - Total: 34.7 sq mi (90.0 km^{2})
  - Land: 34.7 sq mi (90.0 km^{2})
  - Water: 0 sq mi (0.0 km^{2})
- Elevation: 1,037 ft (316 m)

Population (2020)
  - Total: 98
  - Density: 2.8/sq mi (1.1/km^{2})
- Time zone: UTC-6 (Central (CST))
  - Summer (DST): UTC-5 (CDT)
- FIPS code: 27-15868
- GNIS feature ID: 0663975

Dewey Township is a township in Roseau County, Minnesota, United States. The population was 98 at the 2020 census. Dewey is in the 7th congressional district of Minnesota and is represented by Democrat Collin Peterson.

Dewey Township was named for George Dewey (1837–1917), an American admiral.

== Geography ==
According to the United States Census Bureau, the township has a total area of 34.8 square miles (90 km^{2}), all land.

== Demographics ==
As of the census of 2000, there were 114 people, 43 households, and 31 families residing in the township. The population density was 3.3 inhabitants per square mile (1.3/km^{2}). There were 52 housing units at an average density of 1.5 per square mile (0.58/km^{2}). The racial makeup of the township was 100.00% White. Hispanic or Latino of any race were 0.88% of the population.

There were 43 households, out of which 41.9% had children under the age of 18 living with them, 67.4% were married couples living together, 2.3% had a female householder with no husband present, and 27.9% were non-families. 27.9% of all households were made up of individuals, and 7.0% had someone living alone who was 65 years of age or older. The average household size was 2.65 and the average family size was 3.26.

In the township the population was spread out, with 32.5% under the age of 18, 3.5% from 18 to 24, 36.0% from 25 to 44, 18.4% from 45 to 64, and 9.6% who were 65 years of age or older. The median age was 33 years. For every 100 females, there were 103.6 males. For every 100 females age 18 and over, there were 120.0 males.

The median income for a household in the township was $35,179, and the median income for a family was $36,429. Males had a median income of $11,250 versus $18,750 for females. The per capita income for the township was $28,404. There were 5.6% of families and 9.2% of the population living below the poverty line, including 12.5% of under eighteens and none of those over 64.
