= Beaver Township, Roseau County, Minnesota =

Township in Minnesota, United States

Beaver Township, Minnesota
- Township
- Location of Beaver Township, within Roseau County, Minnesota
- Coordinates: 48°38′48″N 95°32′49″W
- Country: United States
- State: Minnesota
- County: Roseau

Area
  - Total: 35.6 sq mi (92.3 km^{2})
  - Land: 35.4 sq mi (91.8 km^{2})
  - Water: 0.23 sq mi (0.6 km^{2})
- Elevation: 1,168 ft (356 m)

Population (2020)
  - Total: 98
  - Density: 2.8/sq mi (1.1/km^{2})
- Time zone: UTC-6 (Central (CST))
  - Summer (DST): UTC-5 (CDT)
- FIPS code: 27-04420
- GNIS feature ID: 0663538

Beaver Township is a township in Roseau County, Minnesota, United States. The population was 98 at the 2020 census.

Beaver Township was named for the abundance of North American beavers formerly within its borders.

== Geography ==
According to the United States Census Bureau, the township has a total area of 35.7 square miles (92 km^{2}), of which 35.4 square miles (92 km^{2}) is land and 0.2 square miles (0.52 km^{2}) (0.62%) is water.

== Demographics ==
As of the census of 2000, there were 103 people, 44 households, and 31 families residing in the township. The population density was 2.9 inhabitants per square mile (1.1/km^{2}). There were 64 housing units at an average density of 1.8 per square mile (0.69/km^{2}). The racial makeup of the township was 100.00% White.

There were 44 households, out of which 25.0% had children under the age of 18 living with them, 56.8% were married couples living together, 9.1% had a female householder with no husband present, and 27.3% were non-families. 22.7% of all households were made up of individuals, and 11.4% had someone living alone who was 65 years of age or older. The average household size was 2.34 and the average family size was 2.69.

In the township the population was spread out, with 18.4% under the age of 18, 5.8% from 18 to 24, 23.3% from 25 to 44, 28.2% from 45 to 64, and 24.3% who were 65 years of age or older. The median age was 46 years. For every 100 females, there were 151.2 males. For every 100 females age 18 and over, there were 147.1 males.

The median income for a household in the township was $46,250, and the median income for a family was $50,000. Males had a median income of $28,125 versus $25,625 for females. The per capita income for the township was $17,265. There were no families and 4.8% of the population living below the poverty line, including no under eighteens and 10.5% of those over 64.
