= Golden Valley Township, Roseau County, Minnesota =

Township in Minnesota, United States

Golden Valley Township, Minnesota
- Township
- Location of Golden Valley Township, within Roseau County, Minnesota
- Coordinates: 48°34′0″N 95°40′23″W
- Country: United States
- State: Minnesota
- County: Roseau

Area
  - Total: 36.2 sq mi (93.7 km^{2})
  - Land: 36.2 sq mi (93.7 km^{2})
  - Water: 0 sq mi (0.0 km^{2})
- Elevation: 1,155 ft (352 m)

Population (2020)
  - Total: 180
  - Density: 5.0/sq mi (1.9/km^{2})
- Time zone: UTC-6 (Central (CST))
  - Summer (DST): UTC-5 (CDT)
- FIPS code: 27-24326
- GNIS feature ID: 0664287

Golden Valley Township is a township in Roseau County, Minnesota, United States. The population was 180 at the 2020 census.

== Geography ==
According to the United States Census Bureau, the township has a total area of 36.2 square miles (94 km^{2}), all land.

== Demographics ==
As of the census of 2000, there were 190 people, 74 households, and 50 families residing in the township. The population density was 5.2 inhabitants per square mile (2.0/km^{2}). There were 99 housing units at an average density of 2.7 per square mile (1.0/km^{2}). The racial makeup of the township was 98.42% White, and 1.58% from two or more races. Hispanic or Latino of any race were 2.11% of the population.

There were 74 households, out of which 41.9% had children under the age of 18 living with them, 52.7% were married couples living together, 6.8% had a female householder with no husband present, and 31.1% were non-families. 27.0% of all households were made up of individuals, and 10.8% had someone living alone who was 65 years of age or older. The average household size was 2.57 and the average family size was 3.08.

In the township the population was spread out, with 32.1% under the age of 18, 4.7% from 18 to 24, 35.8% from 25 to 44, 17.9% from 45 to 64, and 9.5% who were 65 years of age or older. The median age was 37 years. For every 100 females, there were 131.7 males. For every 100 females age 18 and over, there were 122.4 males.

The median income for a household in the township was $44,375, and the median income for a family was $48,625. Males had a median income of $29,167 versus $27,031 for females. The per capita income for the township was $15,513. About 6.1% of families and 9.1% of the population were below the poverty line, including 3.5% of those under the age of eighteen and 11.1% of those 65 or over.
