= Roosevelt, Minnesota =

City in Minnesota, United States

Roosevelt
- City
- Location of Roosevelt, Minnesota
- Coordinates: 48°48′13″N 95°5′51″W
- Country: United States
- State: Minnesota
- Counties: Roseau, Lake of the Woods

Area
  - Total: 1.03 sq mi (2.66 km^{2})
  - Land: 1.03 sq mi (2.66 km^{2})
  - Water: 0 sq mi (0.00 km^{2})
- Elevation: 1,161 ft (354 m)

Population (2020)
  - Total: 153
  - Density: 149.0/sq mi (57.53/km^{2})
- Time zone: UTC-6 (Central (CST))
  - Summer (DST): UTC-5 (CDT)
- ZIP codes: 56673, 56682
- Area code: 218
- FIPS code: 27-55438
- GNIS feature ID: 0650236

Roosevelt is a city in Lake of the Woods and Roseau counties in the State of Minnesota. As of the 2020 census, Roosevelt had a population of 153.

== History ==
A post office called Roosevelt has been in operation since 1901. Roosevelt also features a full service grocery store called Market on Main that has been in operation for over 100 years. The city was named for Theodore Roosevelt the 26th president of the United States.

== Geography ==
According to the United States Census Bureau, the city has a total area of 1.04 square miles (2.69 km^{2}), all land. Most of the city lies in Roseau County, with only a tiny percentage in Lake of the Woods County.

Roosevelt is located along Minnesota State Highway 11.

== Demographics ==
Historical population
Census	Pop.	Note	%±
1910	252		—
1920	276		9.5%
1930	287		4.0%
1940	304		5.9%
1950	228		−25.0%
1960	145		−36.4%
1970	104		−28.3%
1980	124		19.2%
1990	180		45.2%
2000	166		−7.8%
2010	151		−9.0%
2020	153		1.3%
U.S. Decennial Census; 2012 Estimate

=== 2010 census ===
As of the census of 2010, there were 151 people, 61 households, and 42 families living in the city. The population density was 145.2 inhabitants per square mile (56.1/km^{2}). There were 77 housing units at an average density of 74.0 per square mile (28.6/km^{2}). The racial makeup of the city was 97.4% White, 2.0% Native American, and 0.7% from two or more races. Hispanic or Latino of any race were 1.3% of the population.

There were 61 households, of which 26.2% had children under the age of 18 living with them, 54.1% were married couples living together, 6.6% had a female householder with no husband present, 8.2% had a male householder with no wife present, and 31.1% were non-families. 23.0% of all households were made up of individuals, and 9.8% had someone living alone who was 65 years of age or older. The average household size was 2.48 and the average family size was 2.86.

The median age in the city was 45.2 years. 25.8% of residents were under the age of 18; 2.6% were between the ages of 18 and 24; 21.2% were from 25 to 44; 39.8% were from 45 to 64; and 10.6% were 65 years of age or older. The gender makeup of the city was 57.0% male and 43.0% female.

=== 2000 census ===
As of the census of 2000, there were 166 people, 63 households, and 48 families living in the city. The population density was 160.7 inhabitants per square mile (62.0/km^{2}). There were 67 housing units at an average density of 64.9 per square mile (25.1/km^{2}). The racial makeup of the city was 100.00% White.

There were 63 households, out of which 36.5% had children under the age of 18 living with them, 57.1% were married couples living together, 7.9% had a female householder with no husband present, and 23.8% were non-families. 17.5% of all households were made up of individuals, and 3.2% had someone living alone who was 65 years of age or older. The average household size was 2.63 and the average family size was 3.02.

In the city, the population was spread out, with 26.5% under the age of 18, 9.0% from 18 to 24, 31.9% from 25 to 44, 24.7% from 45 to 64, and 7.8% who were 65 years of age or older. The median age was 39 years. For every 100 females, there were 124.3 males. For every 100 females age 18 and over, there were 114.0 males.

The median income for a household in the city was $31,875, and the median income for a family was $35,625. Males had a median income of $27,292 versus $23,036 for females. The per capita income for the city was $15,656. About 8.5% of families and 12.5% of the population were below the poverty line, including 11.4% of those under the age of eighteen and none of those 65 or over.
