= Pohlitz Township, Roseau County, Minnesota =

Township in Minnesota, United States

Pohlitz Township, Minnesota
- Township
- Location of Pohlitz Township, within Roseau County, Minnesota
- Coordinates: 48°55′39″N 96°3′43″W
- Country: United States
- State: Minnesota
- County: Roseau

Area
  - Total: 45.3 sq mi (117.2 km^{2})
  - Land: 42.4 sq mi (109.9 km^{2})
  - Water: 2.9 sq mi (7.4 km^{2})
- Elevation: 1,030 ft (314 m)

Population (2020)
  - Total: 37
  - Density: 0.87/sq mi (0.34/km^{2})
- Time zone: UTC-6 (Central (CST))
  - Summer (DST): UTC-5 (CDT)
- FIPS code: 27-51748
- GNIS feature ID: 0665329

Pohlitz Township is a township in Roseau County, Minnesota, United States. The population was 37 at the 2020 census.

Pohlitz Township was named for an Icelandic settler.

== Geography ==
According to the United States Census Bureau, the township has a total area of 45.3 square miles (117.2 km^{2}); 42.4 square miles (109.9 km^{2}) is land and 2.8 square miles (7.4 km^{2}) (6.30%) is water.

== Demographics ==
As of the census of 2000, there were 36 people, 17 households, and 9 families residing in the township. The population density was 0.8 people per square mile (0.3/km^{2}). There were 27 housing units at an average density of 0.6/sq mi (0.2/km^{2}). The racial makeup of the township was 100.00% White.

There were 17 households, out of which 23.5% had children under the age of 18 living with them, 47.1% were married couples living together, 5.9% had a female householder with no husband present, and 41.2% were non-families. 35.3% of all households were made up of individuals, and 17.6% had someone living alone who was 65 years of age or older. The average household size was 2.12 and the average family size was 2.80.

In the township the population was spread out, with 13.9% under the age of 18, 2.8% from 18 to 24, 25.0% from 25 to 44, 33.3% from 45 to 64, and 25.0% who were 65 years of age or older. The median age was 47 years. For every 100 females, there were 125.0 males. For every 100 females age 18 and over, there were 106.7 males.

The median income for a household in the township was $42,500, and the median income for a family was $43,500. Males had a median income of $27,917 versus $20,313 for females. The per capita income for the township was $19,144. None of the population and none of the families were below the poverty line.
