= Falun Township, Roseau County, Minnesota =

Township in Minnesota, United States

Falun Township, Minnesota
- Township
- Location of Falun Township, within Roseau County, Minnesota
- Coordinates: 48°45′20″N 95°33′36″W
- Country: United States
- State: Minnesota
- County: Roseau

Area
  - Total: 35.6 sq mi (92.2 km^{2})
  - Land: 35.6 sq mi (92.2 km^{2})
  - Water: 0 sq mi (0.0 km^{2})
- Elevation: 1,109 ft (338 m)

Population (2020)
  - Total: 242
  - Density: 6.80/sq mi (2.62/km^{2})
- Time zone: UTC-6 (Central (CST))
  - Summer (DST): UTC-5 (CDT)
- FIPS code: 27-20492
- GNIS feature ID: 0664140

Falun Township is a township in Roseau County, Minnesota, United States. The population was 242 at the 2020 census.

Falun Township was named after Falun, in Sweden.

== Geography ==
According to the United States Census Bureau, the township has a total area of 35.6 square miles (92 km^{2}), all land.

== Demographics ==
As of the census of 2000, there were 226 people, 96 households, and 67 families residing in the township. The population density was 6.4 people per square mile (2.5/km^{2}). There were 108 housing units at an average density of 3.0/sq mi (1.2/km^{2}). The racial makeup of the township was 100.00% White.

There were 96 households, out of which 29.2% had children under the age of 18 living with them, 59.4% were married couples living together, 5.2% had a female householder with no husband present, and 29.2% were non-families. 29.2% of all households were made up of individuals, and 10.4% had someone living alone who was 65 years of age or older. The average household size was 2.35 and the average family size was 2.82.

In the township the population was spread out, with 24.8% under the age of 18, 8.0% from 18 to 24, 27.0% from 25 to 44, 25.2% from 45 to 64, and 15.0% who were 65 years of age or older. The median age was 39 years. For every 100 females, there were 109.3 males. For every 100 females age 18 and over, there were 107.3 males.

The median income for a household in the township was $34,444, and the median income for a family was $36,250. Males had a median income of $29,000 versus $22,679 for females. The per capita income for the township was $16,702. About 3.8% of families and 8.4% of the population were below the poverty line, including 16.9% of those under the age of eighteen and none of those sixty five or over.
