= Moranville Township, Roseau County, Minnesota =

Moranville Township, Minnesota
- Township
- Location of Moranville Township, within Roseau County, Minnesota
- Coordinates: 48°51′28″N 95°17′0″W
- Country: United States
- State: Minnesota
- County: Roseau

Area
  - Total: 35.5 sq mi (91.9 km^{2})
  - Land: 35.5 sq mi (91.9 km^{2})
  - Water: 0 sq mi (0.0 km^{2})
- Elevation: 1,106 ft (337 m)

Population (2020)
  - Total: 911
  - Density: 25.7/sq mi (9.91/km^{2})
- Time zone: UTC-6 (Central (CST))
  - Summer (DST): UTC-5 (CDT)
- FIPS code: 27-44080
- GNIS feature ID: 0665031

Moranville Township is a township in Roseau County, Minnesota, United States. The population was 911 at the 2020 census.

Moranville Township was named for Patrick W. Moran, a pioneer settler.

== Geography ==
According to the United States Census Bureau, the township has a total area of 35.5 square miles (91.9 km^{2}), all land.

== Demographics ==
As of the census of 2000, there were 940 people, 303 households, and 257 families residing in the township. The population density was 26.5 inhabitants per square mile (10.2/km^{2}). There were 326 housing units at an average density of 9.2/sq mi (3.5/km^{2}). The racial makeup of the township was 97.87% White, 1.28% Native American, 0.11% Asian, and 0.74% from two or more races. Hispanic or Latino of any race were 0.32% of the population.

There were 303 households, out of which 50.2% had children under the age of 18 living with them, 75.6% were married couples living together, 4.3% had a female householder with no husband present, and 14.9% were non-families. 13.2% of all households were made up of individuals, and 3.6% had someone living alone who was 65 years of age or older. The average household size was 3.10 and the average family size was 3.40.

In the township the population was spread out, with 35.9% under the age of 18, 6.6% from 18 to 24, 31.3% from 25 to 44, 18.8% from 45 to 64, and 7.4% who were 65 years of age or older. The median age was 33 years. For every 100 females, there were 110.8 males. For every 100 females age 18 and over, there were 109.4 males.

The median income for a household in the township was $41,094, and the median income for a family was $46,071. Males had a median income of $29,464 versus $22,813 for females. The per capita income for the township was $14,975. About 6.7% of families and 7.8% of the population were below the poverty line, including 9.1% of those under age 18 and 22.7% of those age 65 or over.
