= Grimstad Township, Roseau County, Minnesota =

Township in Minnesota, United States

Grimstad Township, Minnesota
- Township
- Location of Grimstad Township, within Roseau County, Minnesota
- Coordinates: 48°39′49″N 95°47′22″W
- Country: United States
- State: Minnesota
- County: Roseau

Area
  - Total: 37.1 sq mi (96.0 km^{2})
  - Land: 37.1 sq mi (96.0 km^{2})
  - Water: 0 sq mi (0.0 km^{2})
- Elevation: 1,119 ft (341 m)

Population (2020)
  - Total: 121
  - Density: 3.26/sq mi (1.26/km^{2})
- Time zone: UTC-6 (Central (CST))
  - Summer (DST): UTC-5 (CDT)
- FIPS code: 27-26036
- GNIS feature ID: 0664357

Grimstad Township is a township in Roseau County, Minnesota, United States. The population was 121 at the 2020 census.

Grimstad Township bears the name of John Grimstad, a Norwegian settler.

== Geography ==
According to the United States Census Bureau, the township has a total area of 37.1 square miles (96 km^{2}), all land.

== Demographics ==
As of the census of 2020, there were 121 people, and as of the census of 2000, there were 76 households, and 58 families residing in the township. The population density was 5.1 inhabitants per square mile (2.0/km^{2}). There were 89 housing units at an average density of 2.4 per square mile (0.93/km^{2}). The racial makeup of the township was 100.00% White.

There were 76 households, out of which 31.6% had children under the age of 18 living with them, 67.1% were married couples living together, 3.9% had a female householder with no husband present, and 22.4% were non-families. 21.1% of all households were made up of individuals, and 5.3% had someone living alone who was 65 years of age or older. The average household size was 2.50 and the average family size was 2.86.

In the township the population was spread out, with 27.4% under the age of 18, 4.7% from 18 to 24, 30.0% from 25 to 44, 22.1% from 45 to 64, and 15.8% who were 65 years of age or older. The median age was 36 years. For every 100 females, there were 126.2 males. For every 100 females age 18 and over, there were 122.6 males.

The median income for a household in the township was $42,500, and the median income for a family was $42,917. Males had a median income of $31,607 versus $27,813 for females. The per capita income for the township was $15,762. About 7.4% of families and 5.2% of the population were below the poverty line, including none of those under the age of eighteen and 4.5% of those 65 or over.
