= Laona Township, Roseau County, Minnesota =

Township in Minnesota, United States

Laona Township, Minnesota
- Township
- Location of Laona Township, within Roseau County, Minnesota
- Coordinates: 48°51′1″N 95°9′2″W
- Country: United States
- State: Minnesota
- County: Roseau

Area
  - Total: 38.1 sq mi (98.6 km^{2})
  - Land: 38.1 sq mi (98.6 km^{2})
  - Water: 0 sq mi (0.0 km^{2})
- Elevation: 1,093 ft (333 m)

Population (2020)
  - Total: 508
  - Density: 13.3/sq mi (5.15/km^{2})
- Time zone: UTC-6 (Central (CST))
  - Summer (DST): UTC-5 (CDT)
- ZIP code: 56673
- Area code: 218
- FIPS code: 27-35594
- GNIS feature ID: 0664727

Laona Township is a township in Roseau County, Minnesota, United States. The population was 508 at the 2020 census.

== Geography ==
According to the United States Census Bureau, the township has a total area of 38.1 square miles (99 km^{2}), of which 38.1 square miles (99 km^{2}) is land and 0.03% is water.

== Demographics ==
As of the census of 2000, there were 578 people, 202 households, and 152 families residing in the township. The population density was 15.2 people per square mile (5.9/km^{2}). There were 223 housing units at an average density of 5.9/sq mi (2.3/km^{2}). The racial makeup of the township was 97.06% White, 0.52% African American, 1.56% Native American, and 0.87% from two or more races. Hispanic or Latino of any race were 0.17% of the population.

There were 202 households, out of which 42.1% had children under the age of 18 living with them, 64.9% were married couples living together, 5.0% had a female householder with no husband present, and 24.3% were non-families. 18.8% of all households were made up of individuals, and 6.9% had someone living alone who was 65 years of age or older. The average household size was 2.86 and the average family size was 3.33.

In the township the population was spread out, with 32.2% under the age of 18, 8.3% from 18 to 24, 29.9% from 25 to 44, 21.8% from 45 to 64, and 7.8% who were 65 years of age or older. The median age was 33 years. For every 100 females, there were 102.8 males. For every 100 females age 18 and over, there were 109.6 males.

The median income for a household in the township was $37,250, and the median income for a family was $40,500. Males had a median income of $26,845 versus $23,393 for females. The per capita income for the township was $15,112. About 5.0% of families and 7.1% of the population were below the poverty line, including 5.4% of those under age 18 and 8.0% of those age 65 or over.
