= Mickinock Township, Roseau County, Minnesota =

Township in Minnesota, United States

Mickinock Township, Minnesota
- Township
- Location of Mickinock Township, within Roseau County, Minnesota
- Coordinates: 48°40′39″N 95°40′51″W
- Country: United States
- State: Minnesota
- County: Roseau

Area
  - Total: 37.7 sq mi (97.6 km^{2})
  - Land: 37.7 sq mi (97.6 km^{2})
  - Water: 0 sq mi (0.0 km^{2})
- Elevation: 1,112 ft (339 m)

Population (2020)
  - Total: 261
  - Density: 6.93/sq mi (2.67/km^{2})
- Time zone: UTC-6 (Central (CST))
  - Summer (DST): UTC-5 (CDT)
- FIPS code: 27-41894
- GNIS feature ID: 0664962

Mickinock Township is a township in Roseau County, Minnesota, United States. The population of the township is 261 according to the 2020 census.

== History ==
Mickinock Township was named for an Ojibwe chief.

== Geography ==
According to the United States Census Bureau, the township has a total area of 37.7 square miles (98 km^{2}), all of which is land.

== Demographics ==
In the 2020 census, there are 261 people, as well as 115 households and 86 families residing in the township. The population density was 8.0 per square mile (3.1/km^{2}). There are 121 housing units at an average density of 3.3 per square mile (1.3/km^{2}). The racial make-up of the township is about 96.55% White, or about 252 people. The remaining 3.45% (about nine people) are from two or more races.

There are 115 households, of which 36.0% had children under the age of 18 living with them, 73.0% were married couples living together, 2.7% had a female householder with no husband present and 22.5% were non-families. 18.0% of all households were made up of individuals and 10.8% had someone living alone who was 65 years of age or older. The average household size was 2.72 and the average family size was 3.13.

28.8% of the population were under the age of 18, 6.0% from 18 to 24, 28.8% from 25 to 44, 23.8% from 45 to 64 and 12.6% were 65 years of age or older. The median age was 38 years. For every 100 females, there were 112.7 males. For every 100 females age 18 and over, there were 115.0 males.

The median household income is $68,375 and the median family income is about $70,000. Males had a median income of $29,750 and females $25,893. The per capita income was $17,697. Out of the town's 261 residents, 5.6% of them (about 14-15 people) are below the poverty line. In total, 1.7% of residents under the age of 18 live in poverty, as do 5.4% of those aged 18–64, and 11.1% of those 65 and older.
