= List of county roads in Pennington County, Minnesota =

- Standard county road markers

Highway names
- Interstates: Interstate X (I-X)
- US Highways: U.S. Highway X (US X)
- State: Trunk Highway X (MN X or TH X)
- County State-Aid Highways: County State-Aid Highway X (CSAH X)
- County Roads: County Road X (CR X)

System links
- County roads of Minnesota; Pennington County

The following is a list of county-maintained roads in Pennington County, Minnesota, United States. Some of the routes included in this list are also county state-aid highways (CSAH).

== Route list ==
Number	Length (mi)	Length (km)	Southern or western terminus	Northern or eastern terminus	Local names	Formed	Removed	Notes
CSAH 1	—	—	Pennington–Polk county line in Polk Centre Township	CSAH 10 north and CSAH 3 south at Pennington–Red Lake county line in Polk Centre Township	140th Street SW	—	—	1st segment
CSAH 1	—	—	CSAH 12 north and CSAH 9 south at Pennington–Red Lake county line in Black River Township	MN 32 at Pennington–Red Lake county line in River Falls Township	140th Street SW, 140th Street SE	—	—	2nd segment
CSAH 1	—	—	CSAH 23 north and CSAH 5 south at Pennington–Red Lake county line in Mayfield Township	CSAH 27 in Hickory Township	140th Street SE	—	—	3rd segment
CSAH 2	19.528	31.427	CSAH 17 in River Falls Township	CSAH 25 in Deer Park Township	120th Street SE	—	—	
CSAH 3	42.070	67.705	Pennington–Polk county line in Polk Centre Township	Pennington–Clearwater county line in Hickory Township	Center Street W, Center Street E	—	—	
CSAH 6	14.023	22.568	CSAH 22 in Kratka Township	CSAH 27 in Star Township	130th Street NE	—	—	
CSAH 7	7.787	12.532	CSAH 12 in Bray Township	MN 32 in Rocksbury Township	140th Street NW, 140th Street NE	—	—	Western segment
CSAH 7	11.012	17.722	CSAH 17 in Rocksbury Township	CSAH 22 in Kratka Township	140th Street NE	—	—	Eastern segment
CSAH 8	—	—	Pennington–Polk county line in Numedal Township	CSAH 13 in Norden Township	170th Street NW	—	—	Western segment
CSAH 8	—	—	CSAH 17 in Thief River Falls	US 59 in Rocksbury Township	150th Street NE	—	—	Eastern segment
CSAH 9	4.499	7.240	MN 219 in Goodridge Township	CR 95 north/CSAH 26 south in Goodridge Township	190th Street NE, 330th Avenue NE, 195th Street NE	—	—	
CSAH 10	15.148	24.378	Pennington–Red Lake county line in Polk Centre Township	Pennington–Marshall county line in Numedal Township	Pembina Trail S, Pembina Trail N	—	—	
CSAH 12	—	—	CSAH 3 in Bray Township	CSAH 7 in Bray Township	150th Avenue NW	—	—	Northern segment
CSAH 12	—	—	Pennington–Red Lake county line in Polk Centre Township	CSAH 3 in Polk Centre Township	140th Avenue SW	—	—	Southern segment
CSAH 13	3.090	4.973	CSAH 7 in Sanders Township	MN 1 in Norden Township	150th Avenue NW	—	—	
CSAH 14	3.699	5.953	MN 1 in Norden Township	Pennington–Marshall county line in Norden Township	120th Avenue NW	—	—	
CSAH 15	—	—	CSAH 3 in Black River Township	MN 1 in Norden Township	Center Avenue N	—	—	Northern segment
CSAH 15	—	—	Pennington–Red Lake county line in Black River Township	CSAH 3 in Black River Township	110th Avenue SW	—	—	Southern segment
CSAH 16	2.367	3.809	MN 32 in Thief River Falls	US 59/MN 1 in Thief River Falls	150th Street NE, 125th Avenue NE, Veterans Memorial Highway	—	—	
CSAH 17	—	—	Thief River Falls city limits	US 59 in North Township	132nd Avenue NE, 180th Street NE	—	—	1st segment
CSAH 17	—	—	CSAH 3 in River Falls Township	CSAH 8 in Thief River Falls	140th Avenue NE	—	—	2nd segment
CSAH 17	—	—	Pennington–Red Lake county line in River Falls Township	CSAH 3 in River Falls Township	140th Avenue SE	—	—	3rd segment
CSAH 18	—	—	MN 1 in Thief River Falls	Pennington–Marshall county line in North Township	150th Avenue NE	—	—	
CSAH 19	—	—	Pennington–Red Lake county line in River Falls Township	CSAH 3 in River Falls Township	170th Avenue SE	—	—	
CSAH 20	—	—	MN 1 in North Township	Pennington–Marshall county line in North Township	170th Avenue NE	—	—	Northern segment
CSAH 20	—	—	CSAH 3 in River Falls Township	US 59 in Rocksbury Township	170th Avenue NE	—	—	Southern segment
CSAH 21	—	—	MN 1 in Silverton Township	Pennington–Marshall county line in Silverton Township	200th Avenue NE	—	—	
CSAH 22	—	—	CSAH 3 in Mayfield Township	Pennington–Marshall county line in Clover Leaf Township	250th Avenue NE	—	—	Northern segment
CSAH 22	—	—	Pennington–Red Lake county line in Mayfield Township	CSAH 3 in Mayfield Township	260th Avenue SE	—	—	Southern segment
CSAH 23	—	—	CSAH 6 in Kratka Township	MN 1 in Clover Leaf Township	280th Avenue NE	—	—	Northern segment
CSAH 23	—	—	Pennington–Red Lake county line in Mayfield Township	CSAH 3 in Mayfield Township	290th Avenue SE	—	—	Southern segment
CSAH 24	—	—	CSAH 3 in Deer Park Township	MN 1/MN 219 north in Goodridge Township	310th Avenue NE	—	—	
CSAH 25	—	—	Pennington–Red Lake county line in Deer Park Township	CSAH 3 in Deer Park Township	330th Avenue SE	—	—	
CSAH 26	—	—	CSAH 3 in Deer Park Township	CSAH 9 west/CR 64 east in Goodridge Township	350th Avenue NE	—	—	
CSAH 27	—	—	Pennington–Polk county line in Hickory Township	MN 1 in Reiner Township	400th Avenue SE, 390th Avenue NE	—	—	
CSAH 28	—	—	MN 1 in Reiner Township	Pennington–Marshall county line in Reiner Township	400th Avenue NE	—	—	
CSAH 30	—	—	Barzen Avenue N south/130th Avenue NE north in Thief River Falls	MN 1 in Thief River Falls	6th Street W	—	—	
CSAH 31	—	—	MN 32 in North Township	CSAH 14 in Norden Township	190th Street NE, 190th Street NW	—	—	Western segment
CSAH 31	—	—	CSAH 18 in North Township	MN 1 in Thief River Falls	Dewey Avenue N, 140th Avenue NE, 190th Street NE	—	—	Eastern segment
CR 51	—	—	CR 97 in Hickory Township	Pennington–Clearwater county line in Hickory Township	150th Street SE	—	—	
CR 52	—	—	Pennington–Red Lake county line in Polk Centre Township	CSAH 12 north/ CSAH 9 south in Polk Centre Township	140th Street SW	—	—	1st segment
CR 52	—	—	CR 84 in Wyandotte Township	Pennington–Red Lake county line in Wyandotte Township	140th Street SW	—	—	2nd segment
CR 52	—	—	CSAH 27 in Hickory Township	in Hickory Township	140th Street SE	—	—	3rd segment
CR 53	—	—	CSAH 12 in Polk Centre Township	CR 69 in Black River Township	130th Street SW	—	—	1st segment
CR 53	—	—	CSAH 15 in Black River Township	CR 72 in Black River Township	130th Street SE	—	—	2nd segment
CR 53	—	—	CR 84 in Wyandotte Township	CR 85 in Wyandotte Township	130th Street SE	—	—	3rd segment
CR 53	—	—	CR 94 in Deer Park Township	in Deer Park Township	130th Street SE	—	—	4th segment
CR 54	—	—	CSAH 10 in Polk Centre Township	CR 69 in Black River Township	120th Street SW	—	—	1st segment
CR 54	—	—	CR 72 in Black River Township	MN 32 in River Falls Township	120th Street SE	—	—	2nd segment
CR 54	—	—	CSAH 25 in Deer Park Township	CSAH 27 in Hickory Township	120th Street SE	—	—	3rd segment
CR 55	—	—	CR 66 in Polk Centre Township	CR 69 in Black River Township	110th Street SW	—	—	1st segment
CR 55	—	—	CSAH 15 in Black River Township	MN 32 in St. Hilaire	110th Street SW, 110th Street SE, Ash Street	—	—	2nd segment
CR 55	—	—	CSAH 17 in River Falls Township	CSAH 19 in River Falls Township	110th Street SE	—	—	3rd segment
CR 55	—	—	US 59 in Wyandotte Township	CR 85 in Wyandotte Township	110th Street SE	—	—	4th segment
CR 55	—	—	CR 100 in Hickory Township	Pennington–Clearwater county line in Hickory Township	110th Street SE	—	—	5th segment
CR 57	—	—	in Bray Township	CSAH 12 in Bray Township	110th Street NW	—	—	1st segment
CR 57	—	—	CSAH 12 in Bray Township	in Sanders Township	115th Street NW	—	—	2nd segment
CR 57	—	—	in Sanders Township	CR 73 in Sanders Township	115th Street NW, 115th Street NE	—	—	3rd segment
CR 57	—	—	CR 73 in Sanders Township	MN 32 in Rocksbury Township	110th Street NE	—	—	4th segment
CR 57	—	—	CSAH 17 in Rocksbury Township	in Smiley Township	110th Street NE	—	—	5th segment
CR 57	—	—	CR 88 in Kratka Township	in Kratka Township	115th Street NE	—	—	6th segment
CR 58	—	—	CSAH 10 in Bray Township	CSAH 12 in Bray Township	120th Street NW	—	—	1st segment
CR 58	—	—	in Rocksbury Township	CSAH 20 in Rocksbury Township	120th Street NE	—	—	2nd segment
CR 58	—	—	US 59 in Smiley Township	CR 88 in Kratka Township	120th Street NE	—	—	3rd segment
CR 58	—	—	CR 92 in Highlanding Township	in Star Township	120th Street NE	—	—	4th segment
CR 59	—	—	CR 68 in Bray Township	MN 32 in Rocksbury Township	130th Street NW, 130th Street NE	—	—	Western segment
CR 59	—	—	CSAH 17 in Rocksbury Township	CR 84 in Smiley Township	130th Street NE	—	—	Eastern segment
CR 60	—	—	CSAH 26 in Highlanding Township	CSAH 27 in Star Township	140th Street NE	—	—	
CR 61	—	—	Pennington–Polk county line in Bray Township	CSAH 10 in Bray Township	150th Street NW	—	—	1st segment
CR 61	—	—	in Sanders Township	CSAH 16 in Thief River Falls	150th Street NW, 150th Street NE	—	—	2nd segment
CR 61	—	—	US 59 in Rocksbury Township	in Smiley Township	150th Street NE	—	—	3rd segment
CR 61	—	—	CR 81 in Smiley Township	CR 94 in Highlanding Township	150th Street NE	—	—	4th segment
CR 62	—	—	CR 74 in Rocksbury Township	CSAH 16 in Thief River Falls	160th Street NE	—	—	1st segment
CR 62	—	—	Kendall Avenue S in Thief River Falls	Hanson Drive in Thief River Falls	160th Street NE	—	—	2nd segment
CR 62	—	—	in North Township	CR 81 in Silverton Township	160th Street NE	—	—	3rd segment
CR 62	—	—	CR 82 in Silverton Township	CR 84 in Silverton Township	160th Street NE	—	—	4th segment
CR 62	—	—	in Clover Leaf Township	CR 89 in Clover Leaf Township	160th Street NE	—	—	5th segment
CR 63	—	—	CSAH 10 in Numedal Township	in Numedal Township	180th Street NW	—	—	1st segment
CR 63	—	—	CR 69 in Norden Township	US 59 in North Township	180th Street NW, 180th Street NE	—	—	2nd segment
CR 63	—	—	CSAH 31 in Thief River Falls	in Clover Leaf Township	142nd Avenue NE, 180th Street NE	—	—	3rd segment
CR 63	—	—	in Goodridge Township	CSAH 28 in Reiner Township	180th Street NE	—	—	4th segment
CR 64	—	—	CR 68 in Numedal Township	CR 69 in Norden Township	190th Street NW	—	—	1st segment
CR 64	—	—	CSAH 18 in North Township	CSAH 21 in Silverton Township	190th Street NE	—	—	2nd segment
CR 64	—	—	CR 87 in Clover Leaf Township	CSAH 22 in Clover Leaf Township	190th Street NE	—	—	3rd segment
CR 64	—	—	CR 90 in Clover Leaf Township	MN 219 in Goodridge Township	190th Street NE	—	—	4th segment
CR 64	—	—	CR 95 north/CSAH 26 south in Goodridge Township	CSAH 28 in Reiner Township	195th Street NE	—	—	5th segment
CR 65	—	—	Pennington–Polk county line in Numedal Township	CR 68 in Numedal Township	200th Street NW	—	—	1st segment
CR 65	—	—	in Norden Township	CSAH 14 in Norden Township	200th Street NW	—	—	2nd segment
CR 65	—	—	CR 73 in Norden Township	MN 32 in North Township	200th Street NE	—	—	3rd segment
CR 65	—	—	in North Township	MN 219 in Goodridge Township	200th Street NE	—	—	4th segment
CR 65A	—	—	CSAH 8 in Numedal Township	in Bray Township	195th Avenue NW	—	—	Historic Pembina Trail Road
CR 66	—	—	CR 54 in Polk Centre Township	CSAH 3 in Polk Centre Township	180th Avenue NW	—	—	
CR 67	—	—	CR 63 in Numedal Township	Pennington–Marshall county line in Numedal Township	170th Avenue NW	—	—	Northern segment
CR 67	—	—	CR 64 in Polk Centre Township	CSAH 3 in Polk Centre Township	152nd Avenue SW	—	—	Southern segment
CR 68	—	—	CSAH 8 in Numedal Township	CR 65 in Numedal Township	160th Avenue NW	—	—	Northern segment
CR 68	—	—	CSAH 3 in Polk Centre Township	CR 59 in Bray Township	160th Avenue NW	—	—	Southern segment
CR 69	—	—	MN 1 in Norden Township	CR 64 in Norden Township	143rd Avenue NW, 180th Street NW, 144th Avenue NW	—	—	1st segment
CR 69	—	—	CSAH 3 in Black River Township	CR 57 in Sanders Township	140th Avenue NW	—	—	2nd segment
CR 69	—	—	Pennington–Red Lake county line in Black River Township	CSAH 3 in Black River Township	130th Avenue SW	—	—	3rd segment
CR 70	—	—	in Sanders Township	MN 1 in Norden Township	130th Avenue NW	—	—	Northern segment
CR 70	—	—	CR 59 in Sanders Township	CSAH 7 in Sanders Township	130th Avenue NW	—	—	Southern segment
CR 71	—	—	CR 57 in Sanders Township	MN 1 in Norden Township	120th Avenue NW	—	—	
CR 72	—	—	MN 1 in Norden Township	Pennington–Marshall county line in Norden Township	Center Avenue N	—	—	Northern segment
CR 72	—	—	Pennington–Red Lake county line in River Falls Township	CR 57 in River Falls Township	Main Street	—	—	Southern segment
CR 73	—	—	CSAH 3 in Black River Township	CR 65 in Norden Township	110th Avenue NE	—	—	
CR 74	—	—	MN 1 in North Township	CSAH 31 in North Township	120th Avenue NE	—	—	Northern segment
CR 74	—	—	CR 57 in Rocksbury Township	CR 62 in Rocksbury Township	120th Avenue NE	—	—	Southern segment
CR 75	—	—	CSAH 16 in Thief River Falls	Greenwood Street in Thief River Falls	130th Avenue NE	—	—	Northern segment
CR 75	—	—	CSAH 3 in River Falls Township	in Rocksbury Township	135th Avenue NE, 130th Avenue NE	—	—	Southern segment
CR 78	—	—	CR 58 in Rocksbury Township	CR 59 in Rocksbury Township	150th Avenue NE	—	—	
CR 79	—	—	CR 57 in Rocksbury Township	CR 58 in Rocksbury Township	160th Avenue NE	—	—	Northern segment
CR 79	—	—	Pennington–Red Lake county line in River Falls Township	CSAH 2 in River Falls Township	165th Avenue SE	—	—	Southern segment
CR 80	—	—	CR 62 in Rocksbury Township	MN 1 in North Township	170th Avenue NE	—	—	Northern segment
CR 80	—	—	CSAH 2 in River Falls Township	CSAH 3 in River Falls Township	180th Avenue SE	—	—	Southern segment
CR 81	—	—	CR 61 in Smiley Township	MN 1 in Silverton Township	180th Avenue NE	—	—	1st segment
CR 81	—	—	CR 59 in Smiley Township	in Smiley Township	180th Avenue NE	—	—	2nd segment
CR 81	—	—	Pennington–Red Lake county line in Wyandotte Township	CR 2 in Wyandotte Township	190th Avenue NE	—	—	3rd segment
CR 82	—	—	CR 62 in Smiley Township	Pennington–Marshall county line in Silverton Township	190th Avenue NE	—	—	
CR 83	—	—	CR 62 in Smiley Township	MN 1 in Silverton Township	200th Avenue NE	—	—	Northern segment
CR 83	—	—	CR 59 in Smiley Township	CSAH 7 in Smiley Township	200th Avenue NE	—	—	Southern segment
CR 84	—	—	CSAH 7 in Smiley Township	CR 65 in Silverton Township	210th Avenue NE	—	—	1st segment
CR 84	—	—	CR 58 in Smiley Township	CR 59 in Smiley Township	210th Avenue NE	—	—	2nd segment
CR 84	—	—	Pennington–Red Lake county line in Wyandotte Township	CSAH 2 in Wyandotte Township	220th Avenue SE	—	—	3rd segment
CR 85	—	—	in Smiley Township	CR 65 in Silverton Township	220th Avenue NE	—	—	1st segment
CR 85	—	—	CSAH 2 in Wyandotte Township	CSAH 3 in Wyandotte Township	230th Avenue SE	—	—	2nd segment
CR 85	—	—	Pennington–Red Lake county line in Wyandotte Township	CR 53 in Wyandotte Township	230th Avenue SE	—	—	3rd segment
CR 87	—	—	CR 63 in Clover Leaf Township	CR 64 in Clover Leaf Township	240th Avenue NE	—	—	
CR 88	—	—	CR 63 in Clover Leaf Township	CR 65 in Clover Leaf Township	260th Avenue NE	—	—	Northern segment
CR 88	—	—	CR 57 in Kratka Township	CR 58 in Kratka Township	260th Avenue NE	—	—	Southern segment
CR 89	—	—	CSAH 6 in Kratka Township	MN 1 in Clover Leaf Township	270th Avenue NE	—	—	1st segment
CR 89	—	—	CSAH 3 in Mayfield Township	CR 57 in Kratka Township	270th Avenue NE	—	—	2nd segment
CR 89	—	—	Pennington–Red Lake county line in Mayfield Township	CSAH 2 in Mayfield Township	280th Avenue SE	—	—	3rd segment
CR 90	—	—	MN 1 in Clover Leaf Township	CR 65 in Clover Leaf Township	280th Avenue NE	—	—	Northern segment
CR 90	—	—	in Kratka Township	CSAH 6 in Kratka Township	280th Avenue NE	—	—	Southern segment
CR 91	—	—	Pennington–Red Lake county line in Mayfield Township	in Mayfield Township	300th Avenue NE	—	—	
CR 92	—	—	CR 61 in Highlanding Township	in Highlanding Township	300th Avenue NE	—	—	1st segment
CR 92	—	—	CR 58 in Highlanding Township	CSAH 6 in Highlanding Township	300th Avenue NE	—	—	2nd segment
CR 92	—	—	CSAH 2 in Deer Park Township	CSAH 3 in Deer Park Township	310th Avenue SE	—	—	3rd segment
CR 93	—	—	Pennington–Red Lake county line in Deer Park Township	CSAH 3 in Deer Park Township	320th Avenue SE	—	—	
CR 94	—	—	CSAH 3 in Deer Park Township	MN 1 in Goodridge Township	330th Avenue NE	—	—	1st segment
CR 94	—	—	in Deer Park Township	CSAH 3 in Deer Park Township	340th Avenue SE	—	—	2nd segment
CR 94	—	—	Pennington–Red Lake county line in Deer Park Township	in Deer Park Township	340th Avenue SE	—	—	3rd segment
CR 95	—	—	CSAH 9 west/CR 64 east in Goodridge Township	Pennington–Marshall county line in Goodridge Township	350th Avenue NE	—	—	
CR 96	—	—	CSAH 6 in Star Township	in Star Township	360th Avenue NE	—	—	1st segment
CR 96	—	—	in Star Township	CR 58 in Star Township	360th Avenue NE	—	—	2nd segment
CR 96	—	—	Pennington–Polk county line in Hickory Township	in Hickory Township	370th Avenue SE	—	—	3rd segment
CR 97	—	—	CSAH 3 in Hickory Township	CR 64 in Reiner Township	370th Avenue NE	—	—	Northern segment
CR 97	—	—	CSAH 1 in Hickory Township	CR 51 in Hickory Township	380th Avenue SE	—	—	Southern segment
CR 98	—	—	MN 1 in Reiner Township	CR 63 in Reiner Township	380th Avenue NE	—	2018	
CR 99	—	—	MN 1 in Reiner Township	CR 63 in Reiner Township	390th Avenue NE	—	2018	
CR 100	—	—	in Star Township	MN 1 in Reiner Township	400th Avenue NE	—	2018	Northern segment until 2018
CR 100	—	—	in Hickory Township	CSAH 3 in Hickory Township	410th Avenue SE	—	—	Southern segment until 2018
