= Minnesota State Highway 219 =

State highway in Minnesota, United States

Trunk Highway 219
- MN 219 highlighted in red

Route information
- Maintained by MnDOT
- Length: 15.331 mi (24.673 km)
- Existed: July 1, 1949–present

Major junctions
- South end: MN 1 / CSAH 24 in Goodridge Township
- North end: MN 89 in Eckvoll Township

Location
- Country: United States
- State: Minnesota
- Counties: Pennington, Marshall

Highway system
- Minnesota Trunk Highway System; Interstate; US; State; Legislative; Scenic
← US 218	→ MN 220

Minnesota State Highway 219 (MN 219) is a 15.331-mile-long (24.673 km) highway in northwest Minnesota, which runs from its intersection with State Highway 1 near Goodridge and continues north to its northern terminus at its intersection with State Highway 89 near Grygla.

MN 219 passes through the communities of Goodridge Township, Goodridge, Moylan Township, and Eckvoll Township.

== Route description ==
Highway 219 serves as a north–south connector route between State Highway 1 and State Highway 89, as well as serves the city of Goodridge. Highway 89 continues north to the city of Roseau.

Agassiz National Wildlife Refuge is located west of the junction of Highway 219 and County State-Aid Highway 7 in Marshall County. The nearby refuge surrounds Mud Lake on County State-Aid Highway 7.

The route is legally defined as Route 219 in the Minnesota Statutes.

== History ==
Highway 219 was authorized on July 1, 1949.

The short section between Highway 1 and Goodridge was paved in 1950. The remainder of the route was paved in 1954 or 1955.

== Major intersections ==
County	Location	mi	km	Destinations	Notes
Pennington	Goodridge Township	0.000	0.000	MN 1 – Thief River Falls, Red Lake CSAH 24 south (310th Avenue NE) – Highlanding	Southern terminus; roadway becomes CSAH 24 south
Pennington	Goodridge Township	1.007	1.621	CR 63 (180th Street NE)	
Pennington	Goodridge Township	1.992	3.206	CR 64 west, CSAH 9 east (190th Street NE)	
Pennington	Goodridge Township	2.983	4.801	CR 65 west (200th Street NE)	
Marshall	Moylan Township	5.067	8.155	CSAH 2 west (220th Street NE)	Southern end of CSAH 2 concurrency
Marshall	Moylan Township	7.014	11.288	CR 129 west, CSAH 2 east (240th Street NE)	Northern end of CSAH 2 concurrency
Marshall	Eckvoll Township	12.097	19.468	CSAH 7 west (290th Street NE)	
Marshall	Eckvoll Township	15.401	24.786	MN 89 – Grygla, Bemidji, Roseau	Northern terminus; roadway becomes MN 89 north
1.000 mi = 1.609 km; 1.000 km = 0.621 mi
