= Minnesota Northwestern Electric Railway =

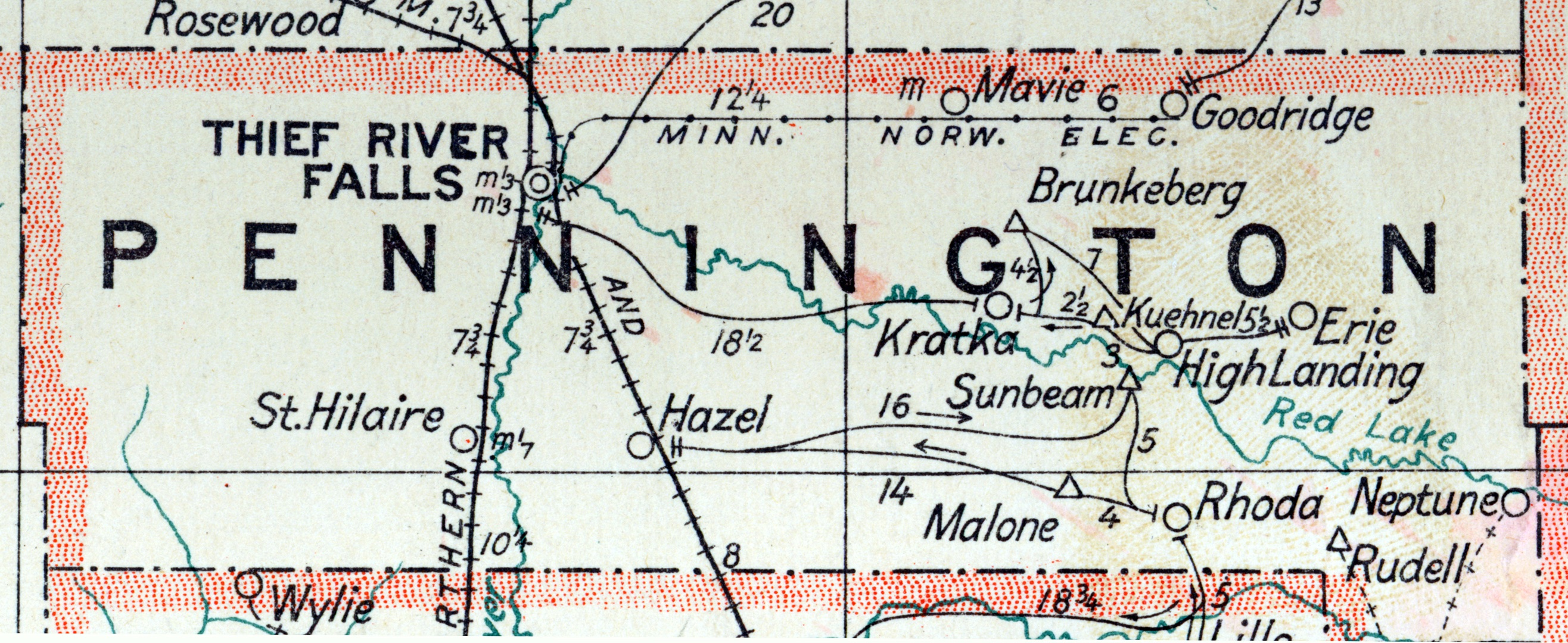
Postal map of Pennington County, including route of the Minnesota Northwestern Electric Railway

The Minnesota Northwestern Electric Railway was an interurban gasoline-electric railway which operated passenger and freight service between Thief River Falls, Minnesota and Goodridge, Minnesota, operating from 1914 to 1940. The railway also served Silverton Township and Mavie. There were several other stops along the way. The original plan was to extend the line all the way to International Falls, Minnesota, however due to poor finances, the line never extended beyond Goodridge.

The line was acquired by the Minneapolis, St. Paul and Sault Ste. Marie Railway ("Soo Line") in 1915, and then leased back to the original management. The railway continued to operate with its only piece of motive power – a General Electric gas-electric interurban car numbered 101 until it ceased operation on March 15, 1940.

The tracks were removed and now the grade is used as the Wapiti Trail which is a snowmobile trail connecting Thief River Falls, Goodridge, and Fourtown.
