= Hazel, Minnesota =

Hazel
- Unincorporated community
- Location within Minnesota Location within the United States
- Coordinates: 48°01′12″N 96°06′55″W
- Country: United States
- State: Minnesota
- County: Pennington
- Elevation: 1,112 ft (339 m)
- Time zone: UTC-6 (Central (CST))
  - Summer (DST): UTC-5 (CDT)
- Area code: 218
- GNIS feature ID: 644799

Hazel is an unincorporated community in Pennington County, Minnesota, United States, along the Canadian Pacific Railway. The community is only marked on county abstracts and has no postal code. Hazel is the location of a Cenex Harvest States shipping facility.

A post office called Hazel was established in 1904, and remained in operation until 1954. The community was named for the abundance of hazel trees near the original town site.

The village of Hazel is clearly designated on Pennington County maps from 1916, and Red Lake County maps from 1911. Pennington County was part of Red Lake County prior to being designated as its own county. An 1896 map of Northwest Minnesota makes no mention of Hazel, corroborating the likely village inception date as being in the very early 1900s.

While specific village census records are not available, the population of River Falls Township, which contains Hazel, was 323 in 1940, and had fallen to 204 by 1960. Some of those residents would have inhabited nearby farms and not necessarily lived in the Hazel village. By 2010, the population of River Falls township had dropped to 178.

Today, Hazel can be found along County State-Aid Highway 3, near the junction of 170th Avenue NE. Besides the Cenex shipping facility, most of the area is covered by cropland, farms, woods, and single-family rural homes. It is approximately eight miles southeast of Thief River Falls, a major regional town, and about five miles east of St. Hilaire. St. Pauli Lutheran Church is one mile north of Hazel, and the Seven Clans Casino is four miles east.

The Hazel area is home to desirable farmland, suitable for growing wheat, barley, alfalfa, sunflowers, corn, and soybeans. Much of the surrounding area has high crop productivity scores of 80 to 89 on a scale of 1 to 100. The Hazel area is serviced by the Pennington County Sheriff, and Thief River Falls Fire Department, and Public School District 564 (Thief River Falls area).
