= Wyandotte Township =

Wyandotte Township may refer to:

- Wyandotte Township, Pennington County, Minnesota
- Wyandotte Township, Ottawa County, Oklahoma

== See also ==
- Wyandotte (disambiguation)
