= Deer Park Township =

Deer Park Township may refer to the following townships in the United States:

- Deer Park Township, LaSalle County, Illinois
- Deer Park Township, Pennington County, Minnesota
