= Highlanding, Minnesota =

Highlanding
- Unincorporated community
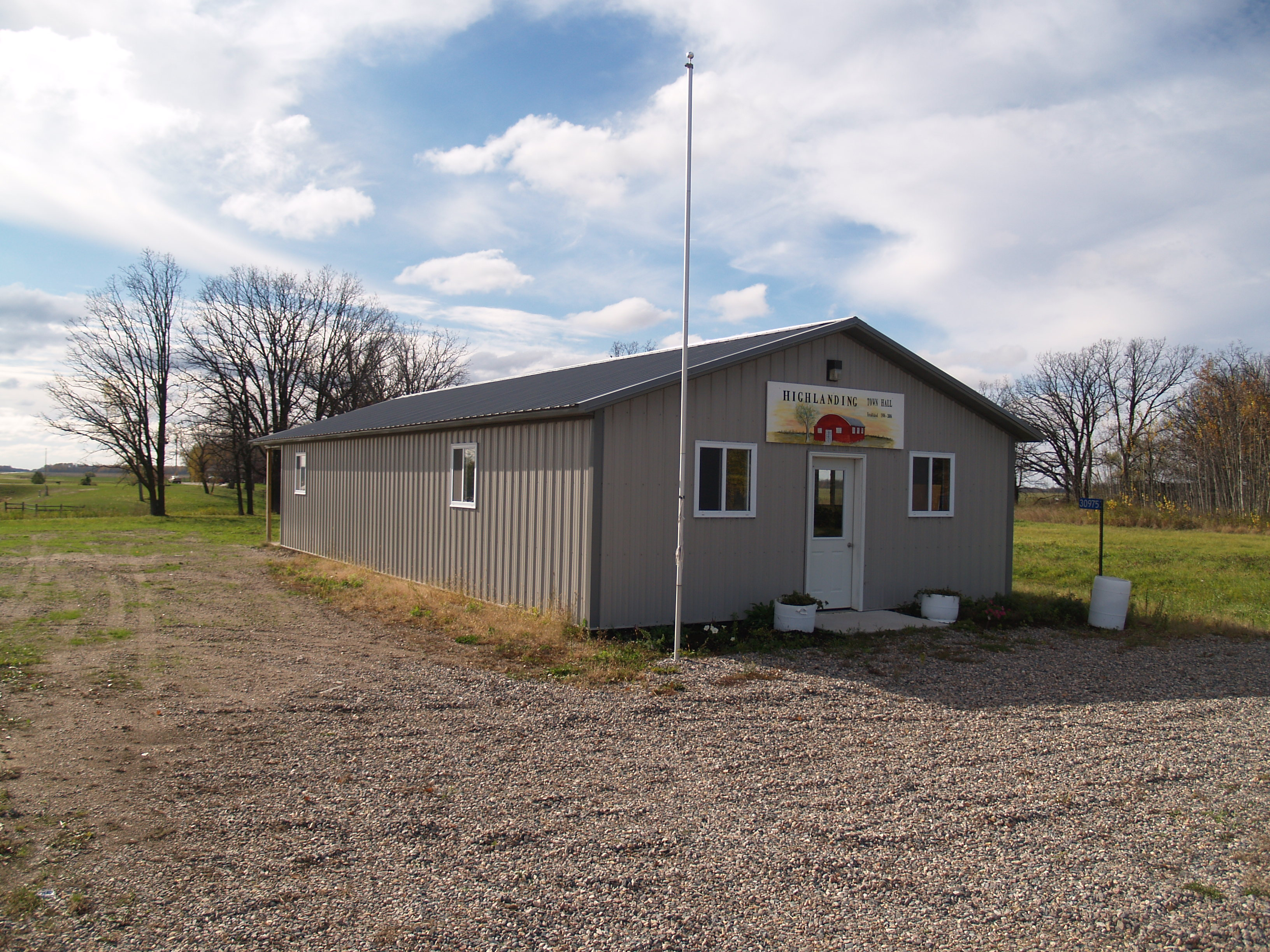
- Highlanding Town Hall

- Location within Minnesota Location within the United States
- Coordinates: 48°02′58″N 95°48′31″W
- Country: United States
- State: Minnesota
- County: Pennington
- Elevation: 1,158 ft (353 m)
- Time zone: UTC-6 (Central (CST))
  - Summer (DST): UTC-5 (CDT)
- Area code: 218
- GNIS feature ID: 654754

Highlanding is an unincorporated community in Highlanding Township in rural Pennington County, Minnesota, United States. The community has long been popular among locals as place to socialize. Highlanding dances date back to the early-to-mid 20th century. The community serves as a popular landing and launching point for canoes and other boaters on the Red Lake River. The USGS has a river monitoring station in the community.

Highlanding does not have a unique postal code but is served by Goodridge. The community is listed on county abstracts.

A post office called High Landing was established in 1905, and remained in operation until 1935. The community was named for its lofty elevation.
