= Thief River Falls Public Library =

- U.S. National Register of Historic Places
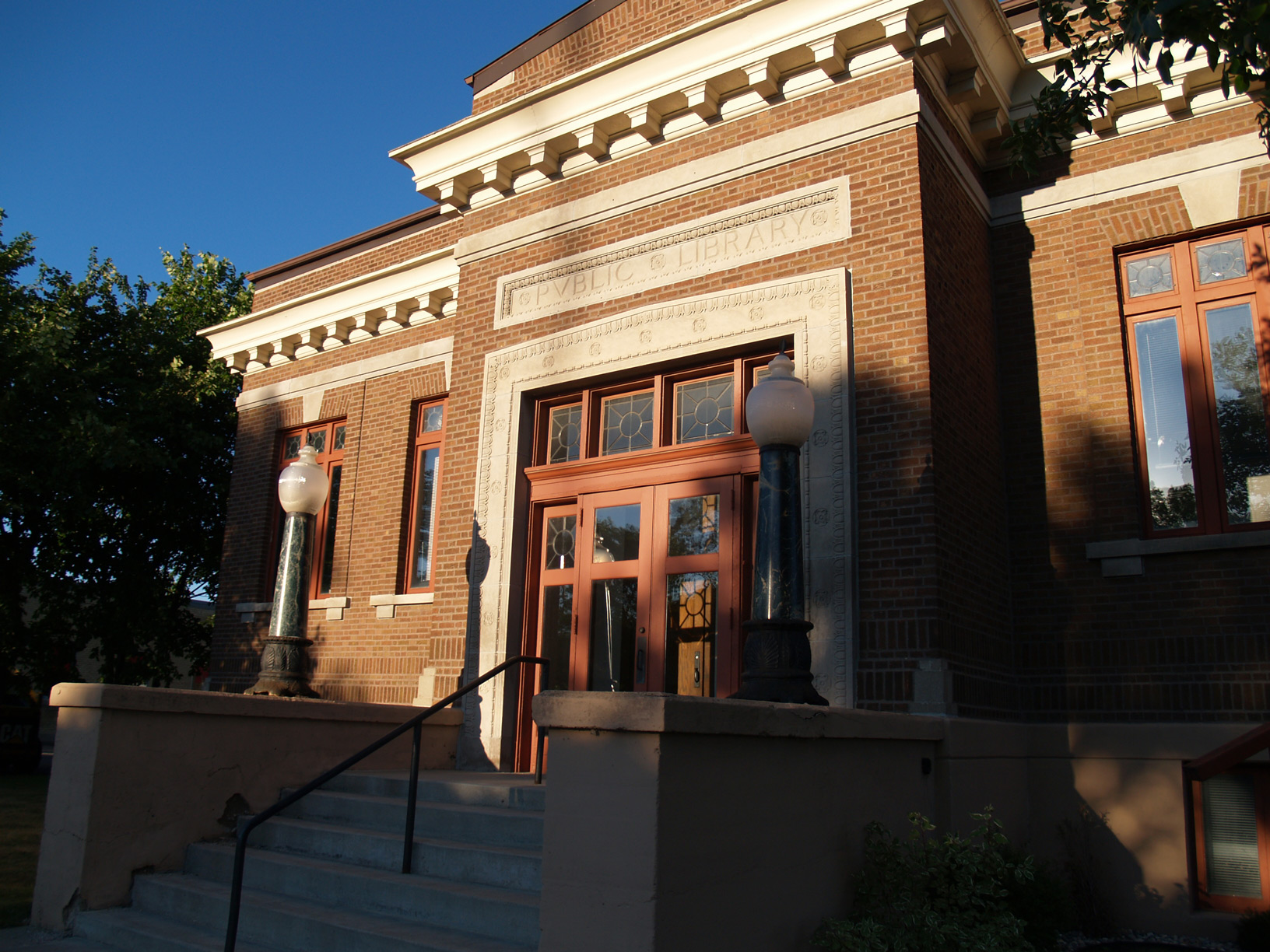

- Location within Minnesota Location within the United States
- Location: 102 N. Main Ave., Thief River Falls, Minnesota
- Coordinates: 48°7′2″N 96°10′51″W
- Built: 1914
- Architect: Lutz, Joseph C.
- NRHP reference No.: 83003763
- Added to NRHP: October 06, 1983

The Thief River Falls Library is a library and historic site in Thief River Falls, Minnesota, USA that dates from 1900.

== History ==
In 1900, a few civic leaders decided that a book collection was needed for everyone to use. Money was raised for a small collection of books which were then housed in the first library, a storefront on 2nd Street, which was provided rent-free.

In the spring of 1902, a small one-story annex was built for the library on the north side of the old City Fire Hall at the corner of First Street and Main Avenue. A Mr. L.G. Browning was hired as the first librarian that year, at the salary of $14 a month.

In 1906, the library became an official separate department of the City of Thief River Falls. When the city moved to its current location, the library also moved and was located in a large room in the basement. As the library grew, it was evident it needed more space. In 1914, the Carnegie Library was built in Thief River Falls and dedicated on May 12, 1915. The Carnegie Library provided the library with a children's section.

Hazel Halgrim, the librarian from 1912 to 1913, again assumed the librarianship in 1925 and remained in the position until 1953. During this time, she implemented county outreach library service. This became a model for the state. In 1929, Pennington County became the eleventh Minnesota County to receive library service. Halgrim became so well respected among librarians in the state, that they first elected her secretary, then president, of the Minnesota Library Association. Known as "Miss Library", Frances Shanahan became the TRF librarian in 1953 and served until her death in 1965. Named one of the three 1962 Outstanding Women of Thief River Falls by the Business and Professional Women's Club, Shanahan would not live to see her two dreams-a new library, and regionalization of library services—come to completion.

It became apparent that the Carnegie Library was crowded and the building was in need of repairs. It was in 1966, that the library moved to its present location across the street from the Carnegie Library, which still houses the library today.

In 1968, Pennington and Red Lake counties banded together to form the Northwest Regional Library system and established the Thief River Falls Public Library as its headquarters library. The regional system helped the TRF Public Library expand its resources through interlibrary loan services, savings from bulk purchases, savings from a centralized processing and administrative staff and much more.

In 1991, during the library's 90th anniversary celebration week, the TRF Public Library automated its circulation system. In late 1994, Internet access was added. During the 90th anniversary celebration, the library board noted a number of other changes that had occurred: the library had gone from a start-up collection of 200 books to over 55,000 books in that time frame. It had also increased the formats it offered from books only to books, newspapers, magazines, videos, audios, CDs and DVDs.

The library provides informational, educational and recreational opportunities to all.

The 1914 Carnegie library building is listed on the National Register of Historic Places.
