= Pennington County, Minnesota =

County in Minnesota, United States

- County
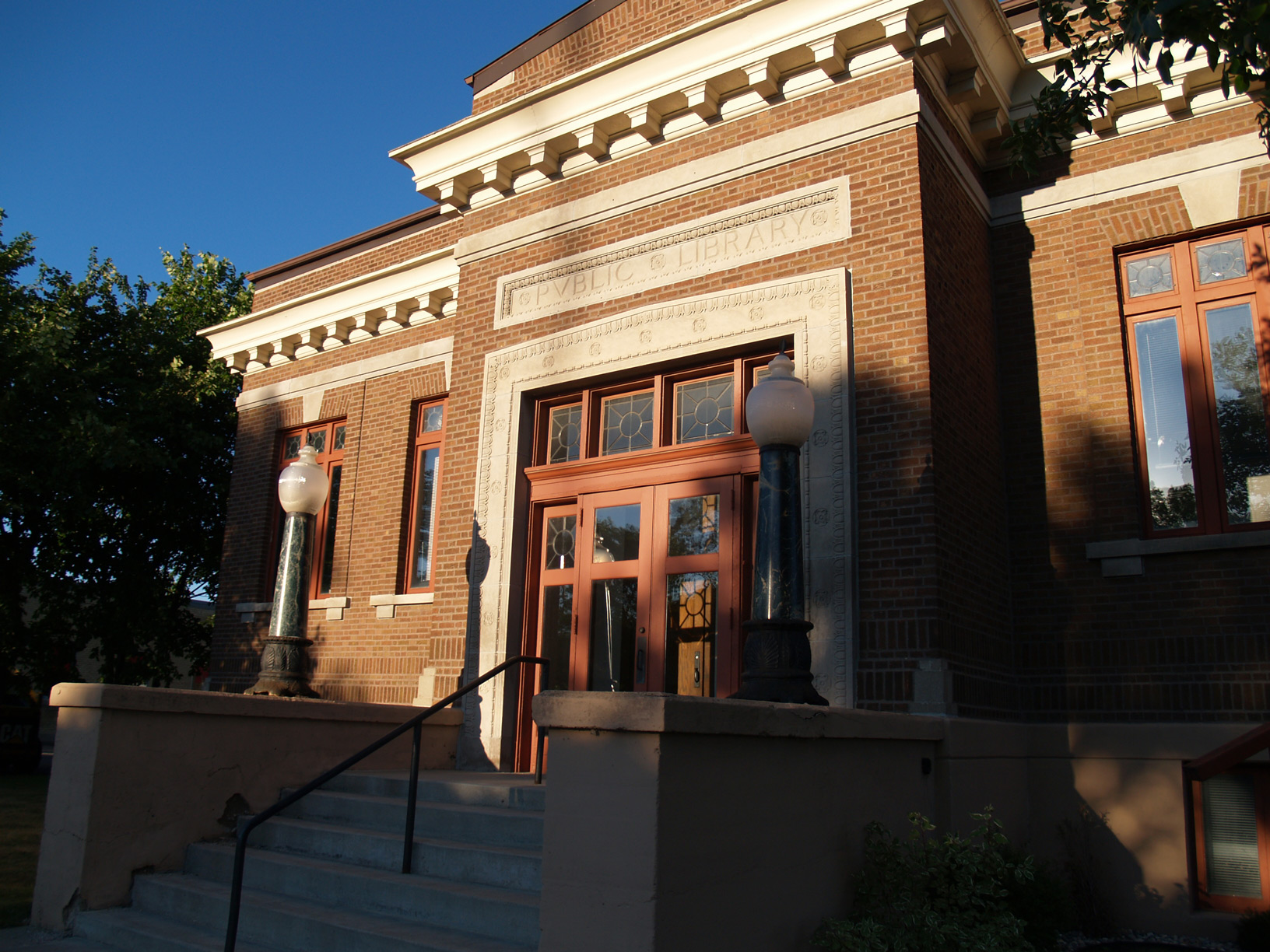
- Old Carnegie Library, downtown Thief River Falls, Minnesota.

- Location within the U.S. state of Minnesota
- Coordinates: 48°04′N 96°02′W
- Country: United States
- State: Minnesota
- Founded: November 23, 1910
- Named for: Edmund Pennington
- Seat: Thief River Falls
- Largest city: Thief River Falls

Area
  - Total: 618 sq mi (1,600 km^{2})
  - Land: 617 sq mi (1,600 km^{2})
  - Water: 1.7 sq mi (4.4 km^{2}) 0.3%

Population (2020)
  - Total: 13,992
  - Estimate (2025): 13,686 ▼
  - Density: 22.7/sq mi (8.8/km^{2})
- Time zone: UTC−6 (Central)
  - Summer (DST): UTC−5 (CDT)
- Congressional district: 7th
- Website: co.pennington.mn.us

Pennington County is a county in the northwestern part of the U.S. state of Minnesota. As of the 2020 census, the population was 13,992. Its county seat is Thief River Falls.

== History ==
The Wisconsin Territory was established by the federal government effective July 3, 1836, and existed until its eastern portion was granted statehood (as Wisconsin) in 1848. The federal government set up the Minnesota Territory in the remaining territory, effective March 3, 1849. The newly organized territorial legislature created nine counties across the territory in October of that year. One of those original counties, Pembina, had its lower portion partitioned in 1858 by the newly organized Minnesota State legislature to create Polk County. On December 24, 1896, the legislature partitioned the northern portion of Polk to create Red Lake County. Then on November 23, 1910, the northern part of Red Lake was sectioned off to create Pennington County, the penultimate Minnesota county to be created (followed by Lake of the Woods in 1922). The county was named for Edmund Pennington (1848-1926), a longtime Minnesota railroad executive, who was serving as president of the Minneapolis, St. Paul, and Sault Ste. Marie Railway when the county was formed. Thief River Falls, the area's major settlement (platted in 1887), was specified as the county seat.

== Geography ==
Soils of Pennington County

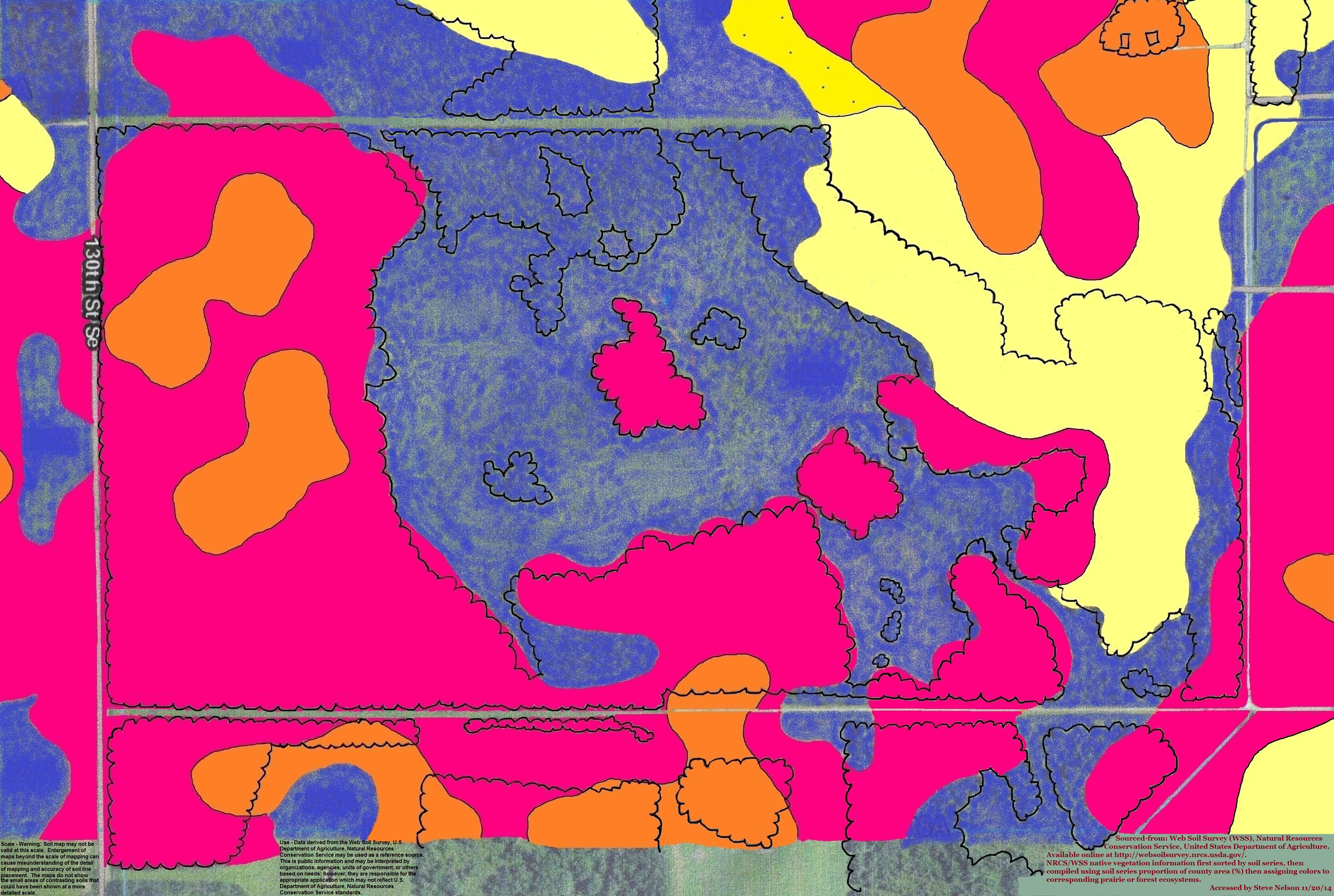
Soils of Oriniak WMA neighborhood

The Red Lake River flows westward into the county from Clearwater County through Pennington's central portion. Near Thief River Falls it is joined by the Thief River, flowing southward into the county from Marshall County. The combined flow exits Pennington County toward the south, then swings west- and northwestward as it moves to its confluence with the Red River near Grand Forks, North Dakota. The county terrain consists of low rolling hills, lightly wooded, with all available areas devoted to agriculture. The terrain slopes to the west and south, with its highest point near the lower east border, at 1,186 ft (361 m) ASL. The county has a total area of 618 square miles (1,600 km^{2}), of which 617 square miles (1,600 km^{2}) is land and 1.7 square miles (4.4 km^{2}) (0.3%) is water. Pennington is one of 17 Minnesota savanna region counties with more savanna soils than either prairie or forest soils.

=== Major highways ===
- U.S. Highway 59
- Minnesota State Highway 1
- Minnesota State Highway 32
- Minnesota State Highway 219
- Pennington County State-Aid Highway 3: Major connector between Pennington County and Grand Forks. Connects with Polk County State-Aid Highway 21.
- Pennington County State-Aid Highway 17: Connects Thief River Falls to the Airport
- Pennington County State-Aid Highway 10: Major route, also known as Pembina Trail
- Pennington County State-Aid Highway 16: US 59 Truck Bypass of Thief River Falls, connects US 59 / MN 1 on the west side of town to MN 32 on the south side of town
- Pennington County State-Aid Highways 27 & 28: Designated and designed for heavy truck traffic connecting US 2 to Roseau County and Marshall County

=== Airports ===
- Thief River Falls Regional Airport

=== Adjacent counties ===
- Marshall County - north
- Beltrami County - east
- Clearwater County - southeast
- Red Lake County - south
- Polk County - west

=== Protected areas ===
- Higinbotham State Wildlife Management Area
- Pembina State Wildlife Management Area

== Demographics ==
Historical population
Census	Pop.	Note	%±
1910	9,376		—
1920	12,091		29.0%
1930	10,487		−13.3%
1940	12,913		23.1%
1950	12,965		0.4%
1960	12,468		−3.8%
1970	13,266		6.4%
1980	15,258		15.0%
1990	13,306		−12.8%
2000	13,584		2.1%
2010	13,930		2.5%
2020	13,992		0.4%
2025 (est.)	13,686	▼	−2.2%
U.S. Decennial Census; 1790-1960 1900-1990; 1990-2000

=== Racial and ethnic composition ===
Pennington County, Minnesota – Racial and ethnic composition Note: the US Census treats Hispanic/Latino as an ethnic category. This table excludes Latinos from the racial categories and assigns them to a separate category. Hispanics/Latinos may be of any race.
Race / Ethnicity (NH = Non-Hispanic)	Pop 1980	Pop 1990	Pop 2000	Pop 2010	Pop 2020	% 1980	% 1990	% 2000	% 2010	% 2020
White alone (NH)	15,064	13,042	13,095	12,867	12,241	98.73%	98.02%	96.40%	92.37%	87.49%
Black or African American alone (NH)	12	10	27	181	177	0.08%	0.08%	0.20%	1.30%	1.27%
Native American or Alaska Native alone (NH)	61	100	108	193	166	0.40%	0.75%	0.80%	1.39%	1.19%
Asian alone (NH)	42	48	80	86	121	0.28%	0.36%	0.59%	0.62%	0.86%
Native Hawaiian or Pacific Islander alone (NH)	x	x	6	1	6	x	x	0.04%	0.01%	0.04%
Other race alone (NH)	9	0	6	6	48	0.06%	0.00%	0.04%	0.04%	0.34%
Mixed race or Multiracial (NH)	x	x	93	216	562	x	x	0.68%	1.55%	4.02%
Hispanic or Latino (any race)	70	106	169	380	671	0.46%	0.80%	1.24%	2.73%	4.80%
Total	15,258	13,306	13,584	13,930	13,992	100.00%	100.00%	100.00%	100.00%	100.00%

=== 2020 census ===
As of the 2020 census, the county had a population of 13,992. The median age was 39.8 years. 22.4% of residents were under the age of 18 and 18.8% of residents were 65 years of age or older. For every 100 females there were 100.0 males, and for every 100 females age 18 and over there were 100.5 males age 18 and over.

The racial makeup of the county was 88.9% White, 1.3% Black or African American, 1.5% American Indian and Alaska Native, 0.9% Asian, <0.1% Native Hawaiian and Pacific Islander, 1.9% from some other race, and 5.6% from two or more races. Hispanic or Latino residents of any race comprised 4.8% of the population.

63.6% of residents lived in urban areas, while 36.4% lived in rural areas.

There were 6,077 households in the county, of which 26.9% had children under the age of 18 living in them. Of all households, 43.8% were married-couple households, 22.0% were households with a male householder and no spouse or partner present, and 25.4% were households with a female householder and no spouse or partner present. About 33.9% of all households were made up of individuals and 13.9% had someone living alone who was 65 years of age or older.

There were 6,639 housing units, of which 8.5% were vacant. Among occupied housing units, 71.8% were owner-occupied and 28.2% were renter-occupied. The homeowner vacancy rate was 1.3% and the rental vacancy rate was 10.2%.

=== 2000 census ===
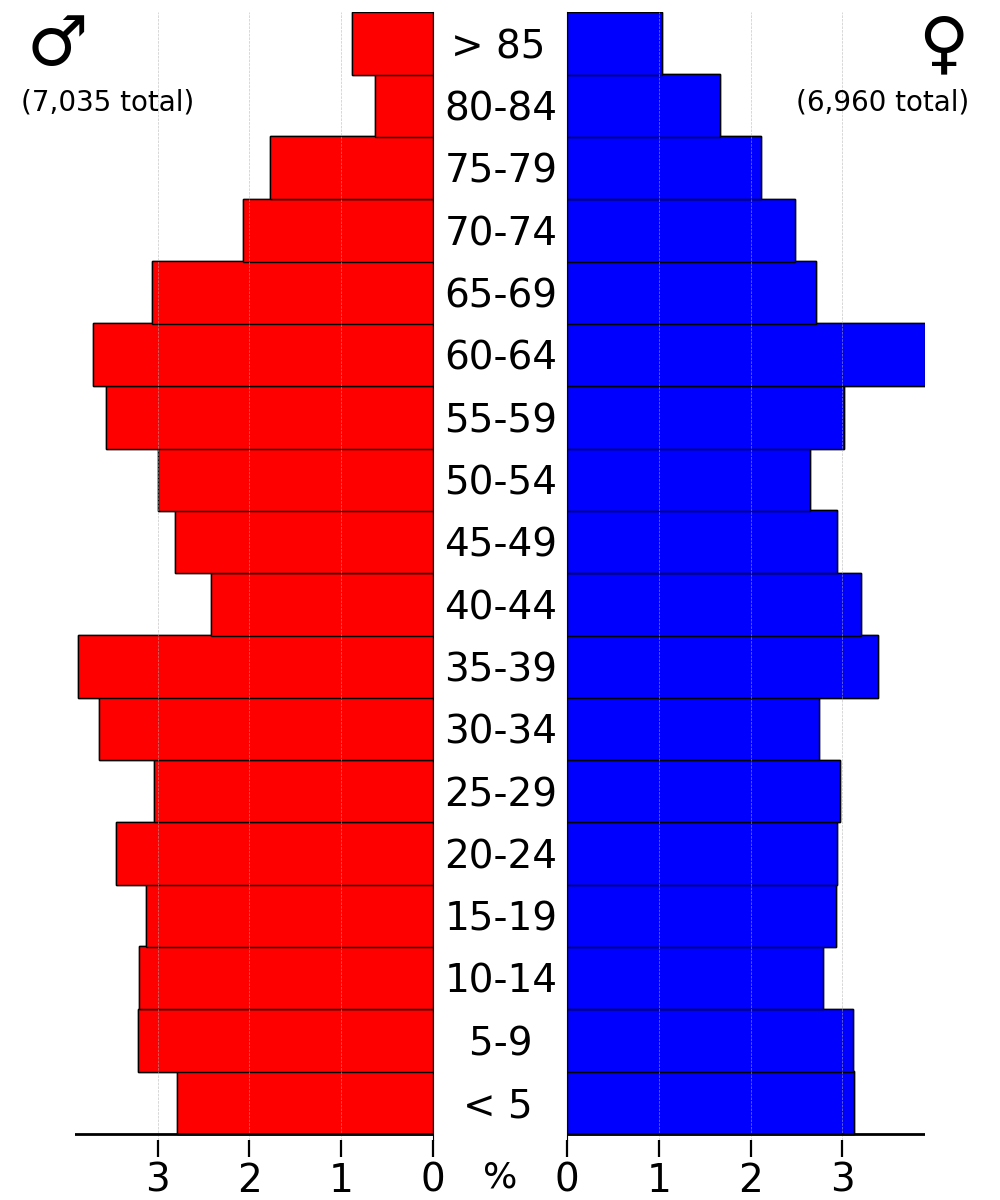
2022 US Census population pyramid for Pennington County, from ACS 5-year estimates

As of the census of 2000, there were 13,584 people, 5,525 households, and 3,552 families in the county. The population density was 22.0 per square mile (8.5/km^{2}). There were 6,033 housing units at an average density of 9.78 per square mile (3.78/km^{2}). The racial makeup of the county was 97.02% White, 0.21% Black or African American, 0.82% Native American, 0.59% Asian, 0.04% Pacific Islander, 0.51% from other races, and 0.81% from two or more races. 1.24% of the population were Hispanic or Latino of any race. 49.0% were of Norwegian, 15.4% German and 7.2% Swedish ancestry.

There were 5,525 households, out of which 30.60% had children under the age of 18 living with them, 51.70% were married couples living together, 9.10% had a female householder with no husband present, and 35.70% were non-families. 29.50% of all households were made up of individuals, and 12.60% had someone living alone who was 65 years of age or older. The average household size was 2.38 and the average family size was 2.95.

The county population contained 24.50% under the age of 18, 10.30% from 18 to 24, 26.50% from 25 to 44, 22.90% from 45 to 64, and 15.80% who were 65 years of age or older. The median age was 38 years. For every 100 females there were 97.50 males. For every 100 females age 18 and over, there were 94.60 males.

The median income for a household in the county was $34,216, and the median income for a family was $43,936. Males had a median income of $30,771 versus $21,078 for females. The per capita income for the county was $17,346. About 7.70% of families and 11.10% of the population were below the poverty line, including 10.70% of those under age 18 and 14.80% of those age 65 or over.

== Communities ==
=== Cities ===
- Goodridge
- St. Hilaire
- Thief River Falls (county seat)

=== Unincorporated communities ===
- Dakota Junction
- Erie
- Hazel
- Highlanding
- Kratka
- Mavie
- River Valley

Townships of Pennington County

=== Townships ===
- Black River Township
- Bray Township
- Clover Leaf Township
- Deer Park Township
- Goodridge Township
- Hickory Township
- Highlanding Township
- Kratka Township
- Mayfield Township
- Norden Township
- North Township
- Numedal Township
- Polk Centre Township
- Reiner Township
- River Falls Township
- Rocksbury Township
- Sanders Township
- Silverton Township
- Smiley Township
- Star Township
- Wyandotte Township

== Politics ==
In the first five elections after its founding, Pennington County had mixed results in presidential elections, voting for four different parties at least once in that span. From 1932 to 1996, the county voted Democratic, typically by moderately healthy margins, in every election save for three nationwide Republican landslides, Richard Nixon in 1972 and Ronald Reagan in both 1980 and 1984. Beginning in 2000, Pennington County has favored Republicans in six of the seven elections, with the exception being Barack Obama winning the county in 2008 by a fairly small margin of about 2%.

United States presidential election results for Pennington County, Minnesota
Year	Republican		Democratic		Third party(ies)	
Year	No.	%	No.	%	No.	%
1912	244	13.03%	423	22.60%	1,205	64.37%
1916	868	40.47%	1,004	46.81%	273	12.73%
1920	2,320	60.70%	768	20.09%	734	19.20%
1924	1,126	31.20%	146	4.05%	2,337	64.75%
1928	2,506	65.29%	1,198	31.21%	134	3.49%
1932	1,212	28.12%	2,743	63.64%	355	8.24%
1936	1,258	24.40%	3,736	72.47%	161	3.12%
1940	1,857	31.79%	3,886	66.53%	98	1.68%
1944	1,525	31.09%	3,330	67.89%	50	1.02%
1948	1,759	31.37%	3,402	60.66%	447	7.97%
1952	2,726	48.55%	2,802	49.90%	87	1.55%
1956	2,408	44.93%	2,947	54.99%	4	0.07%
1960	2,537	44.05%	3,204	55.63%	18	0.31%
1964	1,630	29.45%	3,894	70.37%	10	0.18%
1968	2,247	41.12%	2,998	54.86%	220	4.03%
1972	3,548	53.76%	2,892	43.82%	160	2.42%
1976	3,023	43.51%	3,787	54.50%	138	1.99%
1980	3,715	50.09%	3,101	41.81%	600	8.09%
1984	3,536	54.49%	2,913	44.89%	40	0.62%
1988	2,920	48.10%	3,105	51.14%	46	0.76%
1992	2,155	33.89%	2,578	40.54%	1,626	25.57%
1996	2,129	35.99%	2,814	47.57%	972	16.43%
2000	3,380	53.48%	2,458	38.89%	482	7.63%
2004	3,767	53.68%	3,117	44.42%	133	1.90%
2008	3,248	47.61%	3,394	49.75%	180	2.64%
2012	3,305	50.71%	3,024	46.40%	188	2.88%
2016	4,000	59.57%	2,147	31.97%	568	8.46%
2020	4,532	62.28%	2,568	35.29%	177	2.43%
2024	4,756	64.44%	2,439	33.04%	186	2.52%

== See also ==
- National Register of Historic Places listings in Pennington County, Minnesota
