= Kratka, Minnesota =

Former community in Minnesota, United States

Kratka
- Former community
- Location within Minnesota Location within the United States
- Coordinates: 48°04′30″N 95°54′30″W
- Country: United States
- State: Minnesota
- County: Pennington
- Time zone: UTC-6 (Central (CST))
  - Summer (DST): UTC-5 (CDT)

Kratka was a community in rural Pennington County, Minnesota, United States.

A post office called Kratka was established in 1904, and remained in operation until 1928. The community was named for Frank H. Kratka, a pioneer merchant.
