= Eckvoll Township, Marshall County, Minnesota =

Eckvoll Township, Minnesota
- Township
- Location of Eckvoll Township, within Marshall County, Minnesota
- Coordinates: 48°19′11″N 95°45′55″W
- Country: United States
- State: Minnesota
- County: Marshall

Area
  - Total: 35.4 sq mi (91.8 km^{2})
  - Land: 35.4 sq mi (91.8 km^{2})
  - Water: 0 sq mi (0.0 km^{2})
- Elevation: 1,155 ft (352 m)

Population (2020)
  - Total: 70
  - Density: 2.0/sq mi (0.76/km^{2})
- Time zone: UTC-6 (Central (CST))
  - Summer (DST): UTC-5 (CDT)
- FIPS code: 27-17972
- GNIS feature ID: 0664039

Eckvoll Township is a township in Marshall County, Minnesota, United States. The population was 70 at the 2020 census.

Eckvoll Township was organized in 1901. Eckvoll is a name derived from Norwegian, meaning "oak vale".

== Geography ==
According to the United States Census Bureau, the township has a total area of 35.5 square miles (92 km^{2}), all land.

== Demographics ==
As of the census of 2000, there were 104 people, 31 households, and 27 families residing in the township. The population density was 2.9 inhabitants per square mile (1.1/km^{2}). There were 38 housing units at an average density of 1.1 per square mile (0.42/km^{2}). The racial makeup of the township was 96.15% White, 0.96% Native American, and 2.88% from two or more races. Hispanic or Latino of any race were 2.88% of the population.

There were 31 households, out of which 45.2% had children under the age of 18 living with them, 83.9% were married couples living together, 6.5% had a female householder with no husband present, and 9.7% were non-families. 9.7% of all households were made up of individuals, and 6.5% had someone living alone who was 65 years of age or older. The average household size was 3.35 and the average family size was 3.61.

In the township the population was spread out, with 31.7% under the age of 18, 8.7% from 18 to 24, 24.0% from 25 to 44, 16.3% from 45 to 64, and 19.2% who were 65 years of age or older. The median age was 38 years. For every 100 females, there were 100.0 males. For every 100 females age 18 and over, there were 97.2 males.

The median income for a household in the township was $31,250, and the median income for a family was $32,500. Males had a median income of $18,750 versus $26,250 for females. The per capita income for the township was $20,180. There were 11.5% of families and 6.6% of the population living below the poverty line, including 3.4% of under eighteens and 17.2% of those over 64.
