= North Township, Pennington County, Minnesota =

North Township, Minnesota
- Township
- Location of North Township, within Pennington County, Minnesota
- Coordinates: 48°8′40″N 96°11′8″W
- Country: United States
- State: Minnesota
- County: Pennington

Area
  - Total: 23.4 sq mi (60.6 km^{2})
  - Land: 23.0 sq mi (59.5 km^{2})
  - Water: 0.42 sq mi (1.1 km^{2})
- Elevation: 1,119 ft (341 m)

Population (2020)
  - Total: 761
  - Density: 33.1/sq mi (12.8/km^{2})
- Time zone: UTC-6 (Central (CST))
  - Summer (DST): UTC-5 (CDT)
- ZIP code: 56701
- Area code: 218
- FIPS code: 27-46762
- GNIS feature ID: 0665142

North Township is a township in Pennington County, Minnesota, United States. The population at the 2020 census was 761. The unincorporated community of Dakota Junction is located within the township.

North Township was so named from its location in the northern part of Pennington County.

== Geography ==
According to the United States Census Bureau, the township has a total area of 23.4 square miles (60.6 km^{2}), of which 23.0 square miles (59.5 km^{2}) is land and 0.4 square mile (1.1 km^{2}) (1.84%) is water.

== Demographics ==
As of the census of 2000, there were 726 people, 268 households, and 221 families residing in the township. The population density was 31.6 inhabitants per square mile (12.2/km^{2}). There were 277 housing units at an average density of 12.1/sq mi (4.7/km^{2}). The racial makeup of the township was 98.07% White, 0.55% Native American, 0.69% Asian, 0.14% Pacific Islander, and 0.55% from two or more races.

There were 268 households, out of which 39.2% had children under the age of 18 living with them, 72.8% were married couples living together, 6.7% had a female householder with no husband present, and 17.5% were non-families. 13.8% of all households were made up of individuals, and 4.1% had someone living alone who was 65 years of age or older. The average household size was 2.71 and the average family size was 2.98.

In the township the population was spread out, with 28.8% under the age of 18, 5.0% from 18 to 24, 26.2% from 25 to 44, 26.4% from 45 to 64, and 13.6% who were 65 years of age or older. The median age was 39 years. For every 100 females, there were 103.4 males. For every 100 females age 18 and over, there were 106.8 males.

The median income for a household in the township was $46,406, and the median income for a family was $52,083. Males had a median income of $35,500 versus $21,731 for females. The per capita income for the township was $17,361. About 2.6% of families and 2.6% of the population were below the poverty line, including 0.9% of those under age 18 and 8.0% of those age 65 or over.
