= Numedal Township, Pennington County, Minnesota =

Numedal Township, Minnesota
- Township
- Location of Numedal Township, within Pennington County, Minnesota
- Coordinates: 48°8′36″N 96°25′29″W
- Country: United States
- State: Minnesota
- County: Pennington

Area
  - Total: 27.8 sq mi (72.0 km^{2})
  - Land: 27.8 sq mi (72.0 km^{2})
  - Water: 0 sq mi (0.0 km^{2})
- Elevation: 1,037 ft (316 m)

Population (2020)
  - Total: 97
  - Density: 3.5/sq mi (1.3/km^{2})
- Time zone: UTC-6 (Central (CST))
  - Summer (DST): UTC-5 (CDT)
- FIPS code: 27-47590
- GNIS feature ID: 0665183

Numedal Township is a township in Pennington County, Minnesota, United States. The population was 97 at the 2020 census.

== History ==
The township was named after Numedal, in Norway.

== Geography ==
According to the United States Census Bureau, the township has a total area of 27.8 square miles (72.0 km^{2}), all land.

== Demographics ==
As of the census of 2000, there were 91 people, 35 households, and 29 families residing in the township. The population density was 3.3 people per square mile (1.3/km^{2}). There were 43 housing units at an average density of 1.5/sq mi (0.6/km^{2}). The racial makeup of the township was 96.70% White, 1.10% Native American and 2.20% Asian.

There were 35 households, out of which 42.9% had children under the age of 18 living with them, 62.9% were married couples living together, 5.7% had a female householder with no husband present, and 14.3% were non-families. 11.4% of all households were made up of individuals, and 5.7% had someone living alone who was 65 years of age or older. The average household size was 2.60 and the average family size was 2.73.

In the township the population was spread out, with 28.6% under the age of 18, 3.3% from 18 to 24, 29.7% from 25 to 44, 26.4% from 45 to 64, and 12.1% who were 65 years of age or older. The median age was 36 years. For every 100 females, there were 133.3 males. For every 100 females age 18 and over, there were 140.7 males.

The median income for a household in the township was $41,250, and the median income for a family was $41,667. Males had a median income of $29,688 versus $22,188 for females. The per capita income for the township was $16,068. There were 6.3% of families and 6.0% of the population living below the poverty line, including 6.7% of under eighteens and none of those over 64.
