= Kratka Township, Pennington County, Minnesota =

Kratka Township, Minnesota
- Township
- Location of Kratka Township, within Pennington County, Minnesota
- Coordinates: 48°3′34″N 95°55′19″W
- Country: United States
- State: Minnesota
- County: Pennington

Area
  - Total: 36.1 sq mi (93.5 km^{2})
  - Land: 36.1 sq mi (93.4 km^{2})
  - Water: 0.039 sq mi (0.1 km^{2})
- Elevation: 1,145 ft (349 m)

Population (2020)
  - Total: 145
  - Density: 4.02/sq mi (1.55/km^{2})
- Time zone: UTC-6 (Central (CST))
  - Summer (DST): UTC-5 (CDT)
- FIPS code: 27-33740
- GNIS feature ID: 0664646

Kratka Township is a township in Pennington County, Minnesota, United States. The population was 145 at the 2020 census.

Kratka Township was named for Frank H. Kratka, a pioneer merchant.

== Geography ==
According to the United States Census Bureau, the township has a total area of 36.1 square miles (93 km^{2}), of which 36.1 square miles (93 km^{2}) is land and 0.04 square miles (0.10 km^{2}) (0.11%) is water.

== Demographics ==
As of the census of 2000, there were 139 people, 48 households, and 37 families residing in the township. The population density was 3.9 inhabitants per square mile (1.5/km^{2}). There were 58 housing units at an average density of 1.6 per square mile (0.62/km^{2}). The racial makeup of the township was 100.00% White.

There were 48 households, out of which 37.5% had children under the age of 18 living with them, 72.9% were married couples living together, 2.1% had a female householder with no husband present, and 22.9% were non-families. 20.8% of all households were made up of individuals, and 12.5% had someone living alone who was 65 years of age or older. The average household size was 2.90 and the average family size was 3.41.

In the township the population was spread out, with 25.2% under the age of 18, 11.5% from 18 to 24, 30.2% from 25 to 44, 19.4% from 45 to 64, and 13.7% who were 65 years of age or older. The median age was 40 years. For every 100 females, there were 107.5 males. For every 100 females age 18 and over, there were 108.0 males.

The median income for a household in the township was $46,250, and the median income for a family was $55,625. Males had a median income of $30,000 versus $21,667 for females. The per capita income for the township was $17,326. None of the population and none of the families were below the poverty line.
