= Black River Township, Pennington County, Minnesota =

Black River Township, Minnesota
- Township
- Location of Black River Township, within Pennington County, Minnesota
- Coordinates: 48°0′24″N 96°18′9″W
- Country: United States
- State: Minnesota
- County: Pennington

Area
  - Total: 24.0 sq mi (62.1 km^{2})
  - Land: 24.0 sq mi (62.1 km^{2})
  - Water: 0 sq mi (0.0 km^{2})
- Elevation: 1,086 ft (331 m)

Population (2020)
  - Total: 67
  - Density: 2.8/sq mi (1.1/km^{2})
- Time zone: UTC-6 (Central (CST))
  - Summer (DST): UTC-5 (CDT)
- FIPS code: 27-06364
- GNIS feature ID: 0663610

Black River Township is a township in Pennington County, Minnesota, United States. The population was 67 at the 2020 census.

This township was named for the Black River.

== Geography ==
According to the United States Census Bureau, the township has a total area of 24.0 square miles (62 km^{2}), all land.

== Demographics ==
As of the census of 2000, there were 98 people, 34 households, and 28 families residing in the township. The population density was 4.1 inhabitants per square mile (1.6/km^{2}). There were 41 housing units at an average density of 1.7 per square mile (0.66/km^{2}). The racial makeup of the township was 100.00% White.

There were 34 households, out of which 44.1% had children under the age of 18 living with them, 79.4% were married couples living together, and 17.6% were non-families. 17.6% of all households were made up of individuals, and 2.9% had someone living alone who was 65 years of age or older. The average household size was 2.88 and the average family size was 3.29.

In the township the population was spread out, with 31.6% under the age of 18, 3.1% from 18 to 24, 30.6% from 25 to 44, 29.6% from 45 to 64, and 5.1% who were 65 years of age or older. The median age was 38 years. For every 100 females, there were 127.9 males. For every 100 females age 18 and over, there were 116.1 males.

The median income for a household in the township was $53,750, and the median income for a family was $55,625. Males had a median income of $30,625 versus $25,250 for females. The per capita income for the township was $14,156. There were no families and 2.0% of the population living below the poverty line, including no under eighteens and none of those over 64.
