= Mavie, Minnesota =

Mavie
- Unincorporated community
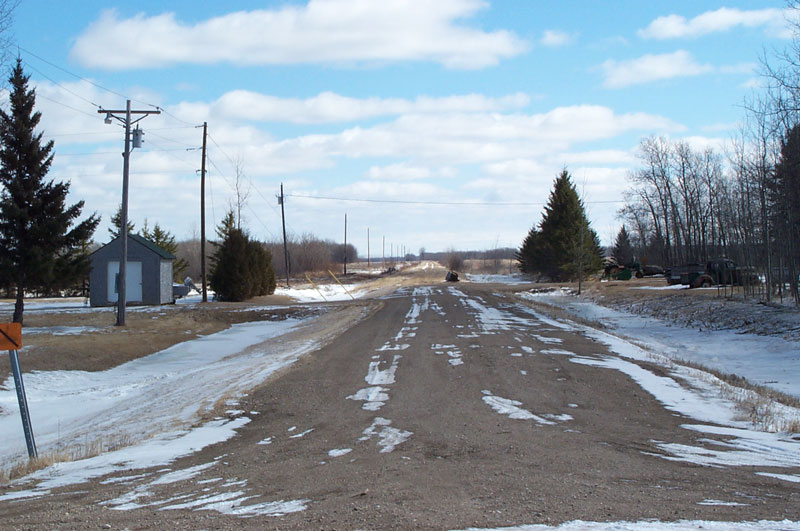

- Location within Minnesota Location within the United States
- Coordinates: 48°08′41″N 95°56′20″W
- Country: United States
- State: Minnesota
- County: Pennington
- Elevation: 1,161 ft (354 m)

Population
  - Total: 20
- Time zone: UTC-6 (Central (CST))
  - Summer (DST): UTC-5 (CDT)
- Area code: 218
- GNIS feature ID: 647625

Mavie is an unincorporated community in the township of Clover Leaf, Pennington County, Minnesota, United States.
