= Bray Township, Pennington County, Minnesota =

Bray Township, Minnesota
- Township
- Location of Bray Township, within Pennington County, Minnesota
- Coordinates: 48°3′36″N 96°25′15″W
- Country: United States
- State: Minnesota
- County: Pennington

Area
  - Total: 36.1 sq mi (93.5 km^{2})
  - Land: 35.9 sq mi (93.0 km^{2})
  - Water: 0.19 sq mi (0.5 km^{2})
- Elevation: 1,020 ft (311 m)

Population (2020)
  - Total: 53
  - Density: 1.5/sq mi (0.57/km^{2})
- Time zone: UTC-6 (Central (CST))
  - Summer (DST): UTC-5 (CDT)
- FIPS code: 27-07444
- GNIS feature ID: 0663656

Bray Township is a township in Pennington County, Minnesota, United States. The population was 53 at the 2020 census.

Bray Township was named for Damase Simon Bray, an early settler.

== Geography ==
According to the United States Census Bureau, the township has a total area of 36.1 square miles (93 km^{2}), of which 35.9 square miles (93 km^{2}) is land and 0.2 square miles (0.52 km^{2}) (0.53%) is water.

== Demographics ==
As of the census of 2000, there were 73 people, 24 households, and 19 families residing in the township. The population density was 2.0 inhabitants per square mile (0.77/km^{2}). There were 26 housing units at an average density of 0.7 per square mile (0.27/km^{2}). The racial makeup of the township was 97.26% White and 2.74% Asian.

There were 24 households, out of which 45.8% had children under the age of 18 living with them, 79.2% were married couples living together, 4.2% had a female householder with no husband present, and 16.7% were non-families. 8.3% of all households were made up of individuals, and none had someone living alone who was 65 years of age or older. The average household size was 3.04 and the average family size was 3.35.

In the township the population was spread out, with 27.4% under the age of 18, 8.2% from 18 to 24, 26.0% from 25 to 44, 28.8% from 45 to 64, and 9.6% who were 65 years of age or older. The median age was 40 years. For every 100 females, there were 102.8 males. For every 100 females age 18 and over, there were 112.0 males.

The median income for a household in the township was $41,563, and the median income for a family was $43,750. Males had a median income of $29,821 versus $20,417 for females. The per capita income for the township was $18,176. There were 11.1% of families and 13.6% of the population living below the poverty line, including 40.0% of under eighteens and none of those over 64.
