= Rocksbury Township, Pennington County, Minnesota =

Rocksbury Township, Minnesota
- Township
- Location of Rocksbury Township, within Pennington County, Minnesota
- Coordinates: 48°4′45″N 96°10′52″W
- Country: United States
- State: Minnesota
- County: Pennington

Area
  - Total: 34.9 sq mi (90.3 km^{2})
  - Land: 34.3 sq mi (88.8 km^{2})
  - Water: 0.54 sq mi (1.4 km^{2})
- Elevation: 1,120 ft (340 m)

Population (2020)
  - Total: 1,102
  - Density: 32.1/sq mi (12.4/km^{2})
- Time zone: UTC-6 (Central (CST))
  - Summer (DST): UTC-5 (CDT)
- ZIP code: 56701
- Area code: 218
- FIPS code: 27-55060
- GNIS feature ID: 0665438
- Website: https://rocksburytownship.com/

Rocksbury Township is a township in Pennington County, Minnesota, United States. The population was 1,102 at the 2020 census.

Rocksbury Township was named for Martin Rockstad, a pioneer farmer.

== Geography ==
According to the United States Census Bureau, the township has a total area of 34.8 square miles (90.3 km^{2}), of which 34.3 square miles (88.8 km^{2}) is land and 0.5 square mile (1.4 km^{2}) (1.55%) is water.

== Demographics ==
As of the census of 2000, there were 1,077 people, 382 households, and 299 families residing in the township. The population density was 31.4 inhabitants per square mile (12.1/km^{2}). There were 408 housing units at an average density of 11.9/sq mi (4.6/km^{2}). The racial makeup of the township was 96.19% White, 0.19% African American, 1.21% Native American, 0.09% Asian, 0.09% Pacific Islander, 1.49% from other races, and 0.74% from two or more races. Hispanic or Latino of any race were 1.95% of the population.

There were 382 households, out of which 36.6% had children under the age of 18 living with them, 70.2% were married couples living together, 4.2% had a female householder with no husband present, and 21.5% were non-families. 16.5% of all households were made up of individuals, and 6.0% had someone living alone who was 65 years of age or older. The average household size was 2.78 and the average family size was 3.11.

In the township the population was spread out, with 29.1% under the age of 18, 8.4% from 18 to 24, 25.9% from 25 to 44, 27.0% from 45 to 64, and 9.7% who were 65 years of age or older. The median age was 38 years. For every 100 females, there were 108.3 males. For every 100 females age 18 and over, there were 109.3 males.

The median income for a household in the township was $50,547, and the median income for a family was $55,446. Males had a median income of $36,719 versus $26,250 for females. The per capita income for the township was $19,491. About 7.4% of families and 10.1% of the population were below the poverty line, including 10.9% of those under age 18 and 10.5% of those age 65 or over.
