= Hickory Township, Pennington County, Minnesota =

Hickory Township, Minnesota
- Township
- Location of Hickory Township, within Pennington County, Minnesota
- Coordinates: 47°58′42″N 95°39′29″W
- Country: United States
- State: Minnesota
- County: Pennington

Area
  - Total: 35.1 sq mi (90.8 km^{2})
  - Land: 35.1 sq mi (90.8 km^{2})
  - Water: 0 sq mi (0.0 km^{2})
- Elevation: 1,165 ft (355 m)

Population (2020)
  - Total: 69
  - Density: 2.0/sq mi (0.76/km^{2})
- Time zone: UTC-6 (Central (CST))
  - Summer (DST): UTC-5 (CDT)
- FIPS code: 27-28808
- GNIS feature ID: 0664466

Hickory Township is a township in Pennington County, Minnesota, United States. The population was 69 at the 2020 census.

Hickory Township was named for its bitternut hickory trees.

== Geography ==
According to the United States Census Bureau, the township has a total area of 35.1 square miles (91 km^{2}), all land.

== Demographics ==
As of the census of 2000, there were 83 people, 34 households, and 21 families residing in the township. The population density was 2.4 inhabitants per square mile (0.93/km^{2}). There were 47 housing units at an average density of 1.3 per square mile (0.50/km^{2}). The racial makeup of the township was 96.39% White and 3.61% Native American. Hispanic or Latino of any race were 2.41% of the population.

There were 34 households, out of which 23.5% had children under the age of 18 living with them, 52.9% were married couples living together, 5.9% had a female householder with no husband present, and 38.2% were non-families. 29.4% of all households were made up of individuals, and 8.8% had someone living alone who was 65 years of age or older. The average household size was 2.44 and the average family size was 3.19.

In the township the population was spread out, with 16.9% under the age of 18, 18.1% from 18 to 24, 21.7% from 25 to 44, 25.3% from 45 to 64, and 18.1% who were 65 years of age or older. The median age was 40 years. For every 100 females, there were 97.6 males. For every 100 females age 18 and over, there were 102.9 males.

The median income for a household in the township was $36,563, and the median income for a family was $38,750. Males had a median income of $13,542 versus $20,313 for females. The per capita income for the township was $18,203. There were no families and 5.5% of the population living below the poverty line, including no under eighteens and none of those over 64.
