= River Falls Township, Pennington County, Minnesota =

River Falls Township, Minnesota
- Township
- Location of River Falls Township, within Pennington County, Minnesota
- Coordinates: 47°59′57″N 96°10′9″W
- Country: United States
- State: Minnesota
- County: Pennington

Area
  - Total: 22.7 sq mi (58.8 km^{2})
  - Land: 22.7 sq mi (58.7 km^{2})
  - Water: 0.039 sq mi (0.1 km^{2})
- Elevation: 1,099 ft (335 m)

Population (2020)
  - Total: 191
  - Density: 8.43/sq mi (3.25/km^{2})
- Time zone: UTC-6 (Central (CST))
  - Summer (DST): UTC-5 (CDT)
- FIPS code: 27-54574
- GNIS feature ID: 0665425

River Falls Township is a township in Pennington County, Minnesota, United States. The population was 191 at the 2020 census.

River Falls Township was named for the rapids on the Red Lake River.

== Geography ==
According to the United States Census Bureau, the township has a total area of 22.7 square miles (58.8 km^{2}), of which 22.7 square miles (58.7 km^{2}) is land and 0.04 square mile (0.1 km^{2}) (0.18%) is water.

== Demographics ==
As of the census of 2000, there were 194 people, 70 households, and 59 families residing in the township. The population density was 8.6 people per square mile (3.3/km^{2}). There were 80 housing units at an average density of 3.5/sq mi (1.4/km^{2}). The racial makeup of the township was 98.97% White, 0.52% African American and 0.52% Asian.

There were 70 households, out of which 32.9% had children under the age of 18 living with them, 75.7% were married couples living together, 5.7% had a female householder with no husband present, and 15.7% were non-families. 12.9% of all households were made up of individuals, and 5.7% had someone living alone who was 65 years of age or older. The average household size was 2.77 and the average family size was 3.03.

In the township the population was spread out, with 27.3% under the age of 18, 6.7% from 18 to 24, 26.3% from 25 to 44, 28.4% from 45 to 64, and 11.3% who were 65 years of age or older. The median age was 39 years. For every 100 females, there were 104.2 males. For every 100 females age 18 and over, there were 116.9 males.

The median income for a household in the township was $43,750, and the median income for a family was $46,250. Males had a median income of $33,750 versus $20,536 for females. The per capita income for the township was $17,186. About 3.4% of families and 5.1% of the population were below the poverty line, including 3.3% of those under the age of eighteen and none of those 65 or over.
