= Star Township, Pennington County, Minnesota =

Star Township, Minnesota
- Township
- Location of Star Township, within Pennington County, Minnesota
- Coordinates: 48°4′17″N 95°40′6″W
- Country: United States
- State: Minnesota
- County: Pennington

Area
  - Total: 36.3 sq mi (93.9 km^{2})
  - Land: 36.3 sq mi (93.9 km^{2})
  - Water: 0 sq mi (0.0 km^{2})
- Elevation: 1,171 ft (357 m)

Population (2020)
  - Total: 101
  - Density: 2.79/sq mi (1.08/km^{2})
- Time zone: UTC-6 (Central (CST))
  - Summer (DST): UTC-5 (CDT)
- FIPS code: 27-62482
- GNIS feature ID: 0665698

Star Township is a township in Pennington County, Minnesota, United States. The population was 101 at the 2020 census.

The name Star Township alludes to L'Étoile du Nord, the state motto of Minnesota.

== Geography ==
According to the United States Census Bureau, the township has a total area of 36.3 square miles (93.9 km^{2}), all land.

== Demographics ==
As of the census of 2000, there were 147 people, 54 households, and 40 families residing in the township. The population density was 4.1 people per square mile (1.6/km^{2}). There were 63 housing units at an average density of 1.7/sq mi (0.7/km^{2}). The racial makeup of the township was 98.64% White and 1.36% Asian.

There were 54 households, out of which 40.7% had children under the age of 18 living with them, 66.7% were married couples living together, 9.3% had a female householder with no husband present, and 24.1% were non-families. 20.4% of all households were made up of individuals, and 13.0% had someone living alone who was 65 years of age or older. The average household size was 2.72 and the average family size was 3.20.

In the township the population was spread out, with 27.2% under the age of 18, 8.2% from 18 to 24, 23.8% from 25 to 44, 23.8% from 45 to 64, and 17.0% who were 65 years of age or older. The median age was 42 years. For every 100 females, there were 101.4 males. For every 100 females age 18 and over, there were 94.5 males.

The median income for a household in the township was $21,250, and the median income for a family was $23,958. Males had a median income of $14,583 versus $22,917 for females. The per capita income for the township was $12,443. There were 25.6% of families and 32.3% of the population living below the poverty line, including 51.6% of under eighteens and 27.0% of those over 64.
