= Cloverleaf Township, Pennington County, Minnesota =

Clover Leaf Township, Minnesota
- Township
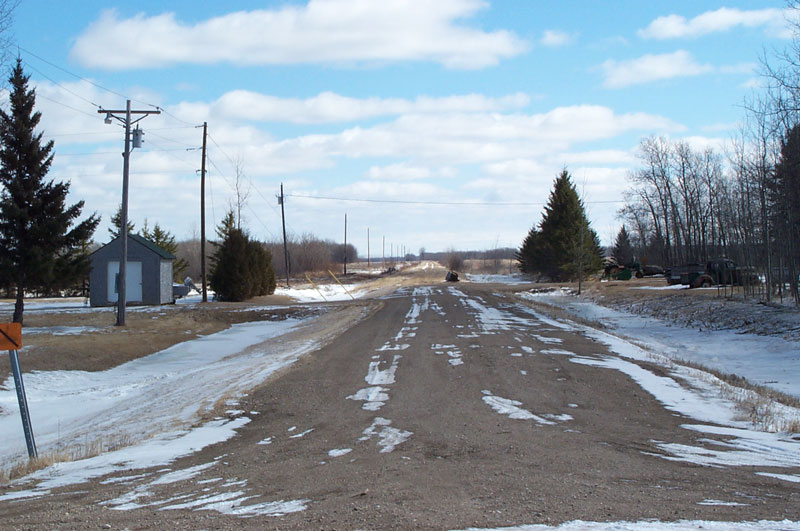
- Mavie, Minnesota

- Location of Cloverleaf Township, within Pennington County, Minnesota
- Coordinates: 48°8′47″N 95°55′43″W
- Country: United States
- State: Minnesota
- County: Pennington

Area
  - Total: 26.9 sq mi (69.6 km^{2})
  - Land: 26.9 sq mi (69.6 km^{2})
  - Water: 0 sq mi (0.0 km^{2})
- Elevation: 1,161 ft (354 m)

Population (2020)
  - Total: 90
  - Density: 3.3/sq mi (1.3/km^{2})
- Time zone: UTC-6 (Central (CST))
  - Summer (DST): UTC-5 (CDT)
- FIPS code: 27-12304
- GNIS feature ID: 0663838

Clover Leaf Township is a township in Pennington County, Minnesota, United States. The population was 90 at the 2020 census. The unincorporated community of Mavie is located within the township.

== History ==
Cloverleaf Township was named for the white clover within its borders.

== Geography ==
According to the United States Census Bureau, the township has a total area of 26.9 square miles (70 km^{2}), of which 26.9 square miles (70 km^{2}) is land and 0.04% is water.

== Demographics ==
As of the census of 2000, there were 70 people, 26 households, and 21 families residing in the township. The population density was 2.6 inhabitants per square mile (1.0/km^{2}). There were 31 housing units at an average density of 1.2 per square mile (0.46/km^{2}). The racial makeup of the township was 98.57% White and 1.43% Native American.

There were 26 households, out of which 42.3% had children under the age of 18 living with them, 80.8% were married couples living together, and 15.4% were non-families. 15.4% of all households were made up of individuals, and 7.7% had someone living alone who was 65 years of age or older. The average household size was 2.69 and the average family size was 2.95.

In the township the population was spread out, with 24.3% under the age of 18, 5.7% from 18 to 24, 27.1% from 25 to 44, 32.9% from 45 to 64, and 10.0% who were 65 years of age or older. The median age was 43 years. For every 100 females, there were 105.9 males. For every 100 females age 18 and over, there were 112.0 males.

The median income for a household in the township was $31,667, and the median income for a family was $31,250. Males had a median income of $20,625 versus $13,750 for females. The per capita income for the township was $14,026. There were no families and 1.4% of the population living below the poverty line, including no under eighteens and 10.0% of those over 64.
