= Polk Centre Township, Pennington County, Minnesota =

Polk Centre Township, Minnesota
- Township
- Location of Polk Centre Township, within Pennington County, Minnesota
- Coordinates: 47°59′59″N 96°24′19″W
- Country: United States
- State: Minnesota
- County: Pennington

Area
  - Total: 24.1 sq mi (62.4 km^{2})
  - Land: 24.1 sq mi (62.4 km^{2})
  - Water: 0 sq mi (0.0 km^{2})
- Elevation: 1,004 ft (306 m)

Population (2020)
  - Total: 66
  - Density: 2.7/sq mi (1.1/km^{2})
- Time zone: UTC-6 (Central (CST))
  - Summer (DST): UTC-5 (CDT)
- FIPS code: 27-51802
- GNIS feature ID: 0665331

Polk Centre Township is a township in Pennington County, Minnesota, United States. The population was 66 at the 2020 census.

Polk Centre Township, originally a part of Polk County, was so named from its former location near the geographical center of that territory.

== Geography ==
According to the United States Census Bureau, the township has a total area of 24.1 square miles (62.4 km^{2}), of which 24.1 square miles (62.4 km^{2}) is land and 0.04% is water.

== Demographics ==
As of the census of 2000, there were 79 people, 29 households, and 22 families residing in the township. The population density was 3.3 people per square mile (1.3/km^{2}). There were 31 housing units at an average density of 1.3/sq mi (0.5/km^{2}). The racial makeup of the township was 97.47% White, and 2.53% from two or more races. Hispanic or Latino of any race were 2.53% of the population.

There were 29 households, out of which 37.9% had children under the age of 18 living with them, 72.4% were married couples living together, and 24.1% were non-families. 20.7% of all households were made up of individuals, and 6.9% had someone living alone who was 65 years of age or older. The average household size was 2.72 and the average family size was 3.23.

In the township the population was spread out, with 29.1% under the age of 18, 5.1% from 18 to 24, 29.1% from 25 to 44, 24.1% from 45 to 64, and 12.7% who were 65 years of age or older. The median age was 42 years. For every 100 females, there were 119.4 males. For every 100 females age 18 and over, there were 115.4 males.

The median income for a household in the township was $31,250, and the median income for a family was $41,875. Males had a median income of $30,938 versus $16,250 for females. The per capita income for the township was $13,136. There were 10.5% of families and 8.2% of the population living below the poverty line, including 21.1% of under eighteens and none of those over 64.
