= Moylan Township, Marshall County, Minnesota =

Moylan Township, Minnesota
- Township
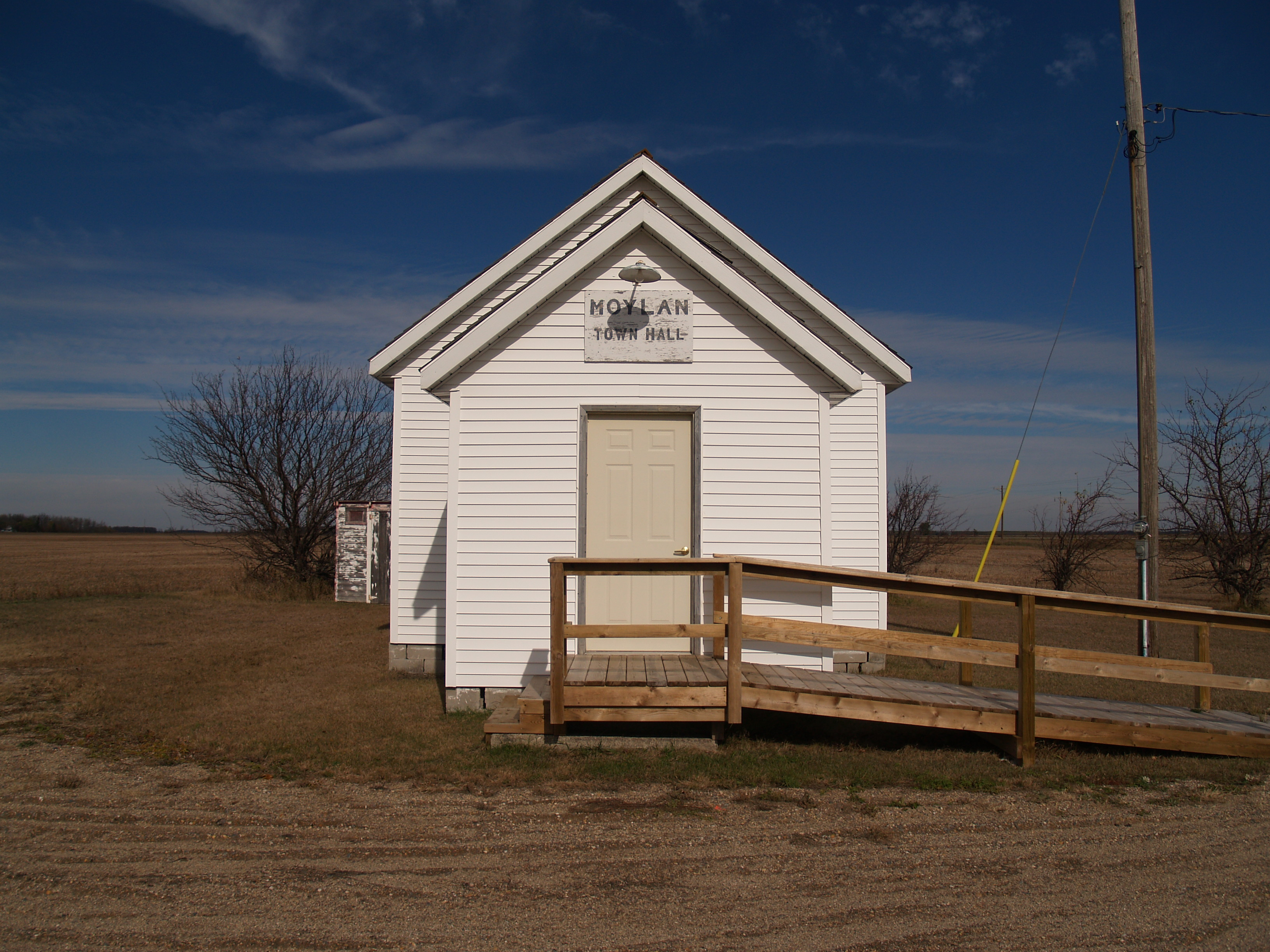
- Moylan Township Hall

- Location of Moylan Township, within Marshall County, Minnesota
- Coordinates: 48°13′24″N 95°47′14″W
- Country: United States
- State: Minnesota
- County: Marshall

Area
  - Total: 45.1 sq mi (116.9 km^{2})
  - Land: 45.1 sq mi (116.9 km^{2})
  - Water: 0 sq mi (0.0 km^{2})
- Elevation: 1,158 ft (353 m)

Population (2020)
  - Total: 96
  - Density: 2.1/sq mi (0.82/km^{2})
- Time zone: UTC-6 (Central (CST))
  - Summer (DST): UTC-5 (CDT)
- FIPS code: 27-44692
- GNIS feature ID: 0665060

Moylan Township is a township in Marshall County, Minnesota, United States. The population was 96 at the 2020 census.

Moylan Township was organized in 1902, and named for Patrick Moylan, an early settler.

== Geography ==
According to the United States Census Bureau, the township has a total area of 45.1 square miles (116.9 km^{2}), of which 45.1 square miles (116.9 km^{2}) is land and 0.02% is water.

== Demographics ==
As of the census of 2000, there were 128 people, 48 households, and 40 families residing in the township. The population density was 2.8 people per square mile (1.1/km^{2}). There were 56 housing units at an average density of 1.2/sq mi (0.5/km^{2}). The racial makeup of the township was 100.00% White.

There were 48 households, out of which 33.3% had children under the age of 18 living with them, 66.7% were married couples living together, 6.3% had a female householder with no husband present, and 14.6% were non-families. 14.6% of all households were made up of individuals, and 4.2% had someone living alone who was 65 years of age or older. The average household size was 2.67 and the average family size was 2.85.

In the township the population was spread out, with 27.3% under the age of 18, 5.5% from 18 to 24, 26.6% from 25 to 44, 25.0% from 45 to 64, and 15.6% who were 65 years of age or older. The median age was 38 years. For every 100 females, there were 120.7 males. For every 100 females age 18 and over, there were 121.4 males.

The median income for a household in the township was $25,833, and the median income for a family was $26,042. Males had a median income of $29,375 versus $17,500 for females. The per capita income for the township was $14,990. There were 22.6% of families and 32.7% of the population living below the poverty line, including 61.5% of under eighteens and 35.0% of those over 64.
