= Reiner Township, Pennington County, Minnesota =

Reiner Township, Minnesota
- Township
- Location of Reiner Township, within Pennington County, Minnesota
- Coordinates: 48°8′38″N 95°40′10″W
- Country: United States
- State: Minnesota
- County: Pennington

Area
  - Total: 26.9 sq mi (69.8 km^{2})
  - Land: 26.9 sq mi (69.8 km^{2})
  - Water: 0 sq mi (0.0 km^{2})
- Elevation: 1,180 ft (360 m)

Population (2020)
  - Total: 92
  - Density: 3.4/sq mi (1.3/km^{2})
- Time zone: UTC-6 (Central (CST))
  - Summer (DST): UTC-5 (CDT)
- FIPS code: 27-53746
- GNIS feature ID: 0665394

Reiner Township is a township in Pennington County, Minnesota, United States. The population was 92 at the 2020 census.

Reiner Township was named for Reinhart Johnsrud, a county official.

== Geography ==
According to the United States Census Bureau, the township has a total area of 27.0 square miles (69.8 km^{2}), all land.

== Demographics ==
As of the census of 2000, there were 94 people, 38 households, and 28 families residing in the township. The population density was 3.5 people per square mile (1.3/km^{2}). There were 41 housing units at an average density of 1.5/sq mi (0.6/km^{2}). The racial makeup of the township was 100.00% White.

There were 38 households, out of which 26.3% had children under the age of 18 living with them, 71.1% were married couples living together, 2.6% had a female householder with no husband present, and 26.3% were non-families. 23.7% of all households were made up of individuals, and 2.6% had someone living alone who was 65 years of age or older. The average household size was 2.47 and the average family size was 2.96.

In the township the population was spread out, with 20.2% under the age of 18, 9.6% from 18 to 24, 27.7% from 25 to 44, 28.7% from 45 to 64, and 13.8% who were 65 years of age or older. The median age was 40 years. For every 100 females, there were 113.6 males. For every 100 females age 18 and over, there were 114.3 males.

The median income for a household in the township was $31,563, and the median income for a family was $31,875. Males had a median income of $30,417 versus $17,083 for females. The per capita income for the township was $18,003. None of the population or the families were below the poverty line.
