= Smiley Township, Pennington County, Minnesota =

Smiley Township, Minnesota
- Township
- Location of Smiley Township, within Pennington County, Minnesota
- Coordinates: 48°4′13″N 96°3′27″W
- Country: United States
- State: Minnesota
- County: Pennington

Area
  - Total: 36.2 sq mi (93.8 km^{2})
  - Land: 36.0 sq mi (93.3 km^{2})
  - Water: 0.23 sq mi (0.6 km^{2})
- Elevation: 1,135 ft (346 m)

Population (2020)
  - Total: 620
  - Density: 17/sq mi (6.6/km^{2})
- Time zone: UTC-6 (Central (CST))
  - Summer (DST): UTC-5 (CDT)
- ZIP code: 56701
- Area code: 218
- FIPS code: 27-60898
- GNIS feature ID: 0665635
- Website: https://smileytownship.org/

Smiley Township is a township in Pennington County, Minnesota, United States. The population was 620 at the 2020 census.

Smiley Township was named for William C. Smiley, a county official.

== Geography ==
According to the United States Census Bureau, the township has a total area of 36.2 square miles (93.8 km^{2}), of which 36.0 square miles (93.3 km^{2}) is land and 0.2 square mile (0.6 km^{2}) (0.61%) is water.

== Demographics ==
As of the census of 2000, there were 528 people, 186 households, and 146 families residing in the township. The population density was 14.7 people per square mile (5.7/km^{2}). There were 202 housing units at an average density of 5.6/sq mi (2.2/km^{2}). The racial makeup of the township was 95.45% White, 0.95% Native American, 1.52% Asian, 0.19% Pacific Islander, and 1.89% from two or more races.

There were 186 households, out of which 40.9% had children under the age of 18 living with them, 65.6% were married couples living together, 8.1% had a female householder with no husband present, and 21.0% were non-families. 15.1% of all households were made up of individuals, and 3.8% had someone living alone who was 65 years of age or older. The average household size was 2.84 and the average family size was 3.12.

In the township the population was spread out, with 27.8% under the age of 18, 11.4% from 18 to 24, 27.5% from 25 to 44, 25.4% from 45 to 64, and 8.0% who were 65 years of age or older. The median age was 34 years. For every 100 females, there were 112.9 males. For every 100 females age 18 and over, there were 119.0 males.

The median income for a household in the township was $47,386, and the median income for a family was $50,250. Males had a median income of $28,750 versus $25,313 for females. The per capita income for the township was $17,431. About 9.7% of families and 12.0% of the population were below the poverty line, including 20.1% of those under age 18 and none of those age 65 or over.
