= Mayfield Township, Pennington County, Minnesota =

Mayfield Township, Minnesota
- Township
- Location of Mayfield Township, within Pennington County, Minnesota
- Coordinates: 48°0′4″N 95°53′53″W
- Country: United States
- State: Minnesota
- County: Pennington

Area
  - Total: 22.8 sq mi (59.1 km^{2})
  - Land: 22.8 sq mi (59.1 km^{2})
  - Water: 0 sq mi (0.0 km^{2})
- Elevation: 1,152 ft (351 m)

Population (2020)
  - Total: 49
  - Density: 2.1/sq mi (0.83/km^{2})
- Time zone: UTC-6 (Central (CST))
  - Summer (DST): UTC-5 (CDT)
- FIPS code: 27-41156
- GNIS feature ID: 0664934

Mayfield Township is a township in Pennington County, Minnesota, United States. The population was 49 at the 2020 census.

Mayfield Township was named for A. C. Mayfield, an early settler.

== Geography ==
According to the United States Census Bureau, the township has a total area of 22.8 square miles (59.1 km^{2}), all land.

== Demographics ==
As of the census of 2000, there were 76 people, 27 households, and 22 families residing in the township. The population density was 3.3 inhabitants per square mile (1.3/km^{2}). There were 35 housing units at an average density of 1.5 per square mile (0.58/km^{2}). The racial makeup of the township was 100.00% White.

There were 27 households, out of which 37.0% had children under the age of 18 living with them, 66.7% were married couples living together, 3.7% had a female householder with no husband present, and 18.5% were non-families. 14.8% of all households were made up of individuals, and 11.1% had someone living alone who was 65 years of age or older. The average household size was 2.81 and the average family size was 3.14.

In the township the population was spread out, with 25.0% under the age of 18, 14.5% from 18 to 24, 18.4% from 25 to 44, 26.3% from 45 to 64, and 15.8% who were 65 years of age or older. The median age was 43 years. For every 100 females, there were 105.4 males and for every 100 females age 18 and over, there were 119.2 males.

The median income for a household in the township was $36,250, and the median income for a family was $40,000. Males had a median income of $33,125 versus $0 for females. The per capita income for the township was $11,743. There were 20.0% of families and 20.6% of the population living below the poverty line, including 21.4% of under eighteens and 57.1% of those over 64.
