= Sanders Township, Pennington County, Minnesota =

Sanders Township, Minnesota
- Township
- Location of Sanders Township, within Pennington County, Minnesota
- Coordinates: 48°4′17″N 96°17′42″W
- Country: United States
- State: Minnesota
- County: Pennington

Area
  - Total: 36.2 sq mi (93.7 km^{2})
  - Land: 36.2 sq mi (93.7 km^{2})
  - Water: 0 sq mi (0.0 km^{2})
- Elevation: 1,112 ft (339 m)

Population (2020)
  - Total: 298
  - Density: 8.24/sq mi (3.18/km^{2})
- Time zone: UTC-6 (Central (CST))
  - Summer (DST): UTC-5 (CDT)
- FIPS code: 27-58342
- GNIS feature ID: 0665542

Sanders Township is a township in Pennington County, Minnesota, United States. The population was 298 at the 2020 census.

Sanders Township was named for Sander Engebretson, a Norwegian settler.

== Geography ==
According to the United States Census Bureau, the township has a total area of 36.2 square miles (93.7 km^{2}), all land.

== Demographics ==
As of the census of 2000, there were 285 people, 104 households, and 79 families residing in the township. The population density was 7.9 people per square mile (3.0/km^{2}). There were 113 housing units at an average density of 3.1/sq mi (1.2/km^{2}). The racial makeup of the township was 99.30% White, 0.35% Native American and 0.35% Asian. Hispanic or Latino of any race were 0.70% of the population.

There were 104 households, out of which 35.6% had children under the age of 18 living with them, 69.2% were married couples living together, 1.9% had a female householder with no husband present, and 24.0% were non-families. 20.2% of all households were made up of individuals, and 5.8% had someone living alone who was 65 years of age or older. The average household size was 2.74 and the average family size was 3.19.

In the township the population was spread out, with 26.7% under the age of 18, 6.0% from 18 to 24, 28.8% from 25 to 44, 28.1% from 45 to 64, and 10.5% who were 65 years of age or older. The median age was 39 years. For every 100 females, there were 120.9 males. For every 100 females age 18 and over, there were 117.7 males.

The median income for a household in the township was $36,250, and the median income for a family was $44,792. Males had a median income of $28,750 versus $26,667 for females. The per capita income for the township was $14,376. About 17.8% of families and 18.8% of the population were below the poverty line, including 17.6% of those under the age of eighteen and 36.1% of those 65 or over.
