= Goodridge, Minnesota =

City in Minnesota, United States

- City
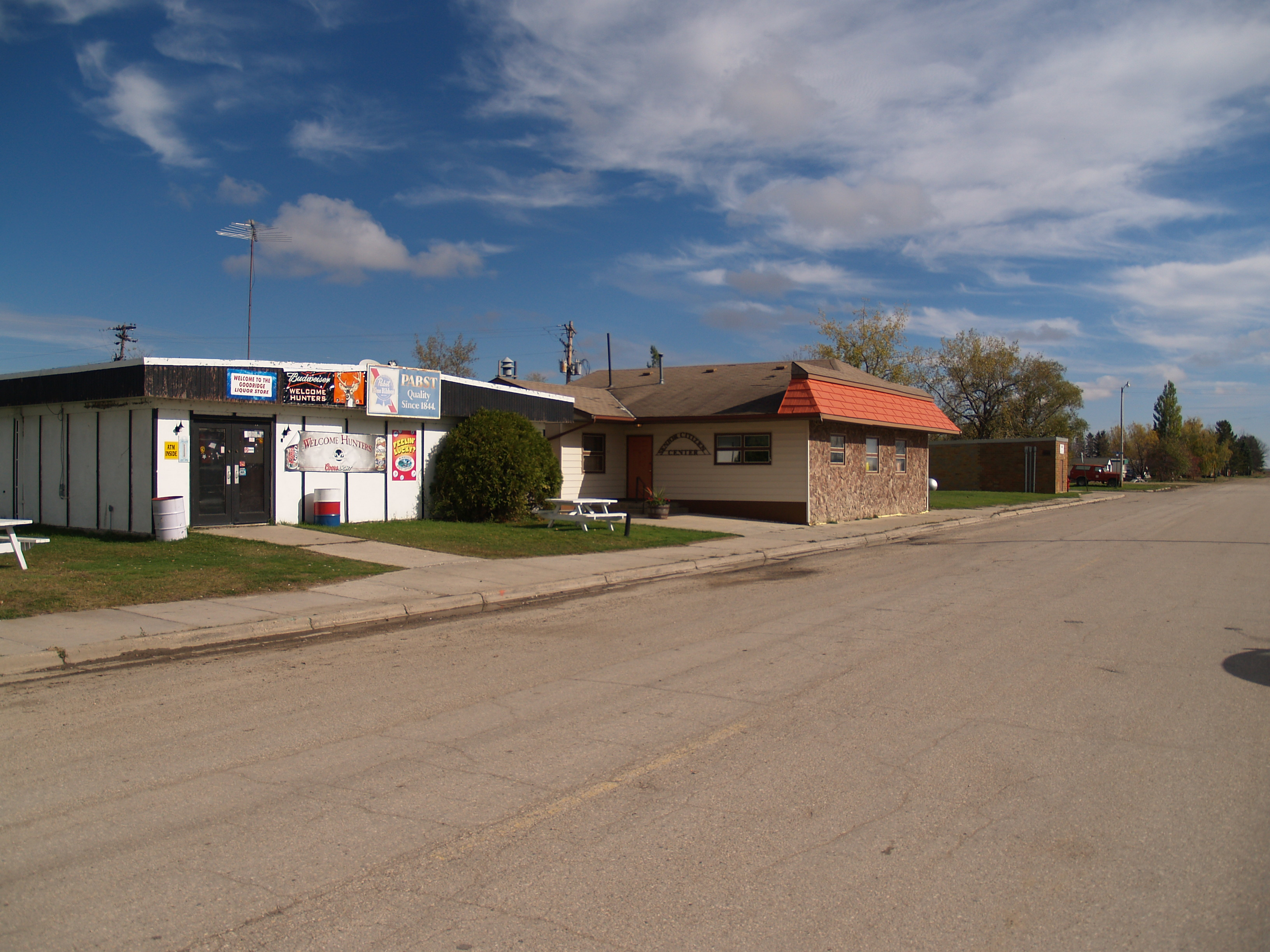
- Downtown Goodridge

- Location of Goodridge, Minnesota
- Coordinates: 48°8′38″N 95°48′21″W
- Country: United States
- State: Minnesota
- County: Pennington
- Incorporated: August 19, 1915

Government
  - Mayor: Kramer Hanson

Area
  - Total: 0.188 sq mi (0.487 km^{2})
  - Land: 0.188 sq mi (0.487 km^{2})
  - Water: 0 sq mi (0.000 km^{2})
- Elevation: 1,171 ft (357 m)

Population (2020)
  - Total: 112
  - Estimate (2022): 109
  - Density: 600/sq mi (230/km^{2})
- Time zone: UTC−6 (Central (CST))
  - Summer (DST): UTC−5 (CDT)
- ZIP Code: 56725
- Area code: 218
- FIPS code: 27-24470
- GNIS feature ID: 0644226
- Sales tax: 6.875%

Goodridge is a small city in Pennington County, Minnesota, United States. The population was 112 at the 2020 census. The city is located within Goodridge Township, but is politically independent.

== History ==
A post office called Goodridge has been in operation since 1915. The city was named for a ridge near the town site.

== Geography ==
According to the United States Census Bureau, the city has a total area of 0.188 square miles (0.49 km^{2}), all land.

State Highway 1, State Highway 219, and County State-Aid Highway 24 are three of the main routes in the community.

Goodridge was the eastern terminus of the Minnesota Northwestern Electric Railway from 1914 until that company's demise in 1940.

== Demographics ==
Historical population
Census	Pop.	Note	%±
1920	231		—
1930	171		−26.0%
1940	174		1.8%
1950	144		−17.2%
1960	134		−6.9%
1970	144		7.5%
1980	191		32.6%
1990	115		−39.8%
2000	98		−14.8%
2010	132		34.7%
2020	112		−15.2%
2022 (est.)	109		−2.7%
U.S. Decennial Census; 2020 Census

=== 2010 census ===
As of the 2010 census, there were 132 people, 60 households, and 36 families residing in the city. The population density was 694.7 inhabitants per square mile (268.2/km^{2}). There were 66 housing units at an average density of 347.4 per square mile (134.1/km^{2}). The racial makeup of the city was 97.0% White, 0.8% African American, 0.8% Native American, and 1.5% from other races. Hispanic or Latino of any race were 4.5% of the population.

There were 60 households, of which 35.0% had children under the age of 18 living with them, 33.3% were married couples living together, 21.7% had a female householder with no husband present, 5.0% had a male householder with no wife present, and 40.0% were non-families. 40.0% of all households were made up of individuals, and 10% had someone living alone who was 65 years of age or older. The average household size was 2.20 and the average family size was 2.89.

The median age in the city was 41.7 years. 30.3% of residents were under the age of 18; 5.3% were between the ages of 18 and 24; 26.5% were from 25 to 44; 27.3% were from 45 to 64; and 10.6% were 65 years of age or older. The gender makeup of the city was 49.2% male and 50.8% female.

=== 2000 census ===
As of the 2000 census, there were 98 people, 47 households, and 26 families residing in the city. The population density was 523.1 inhabitants per square mile (202.0/km^{2}). There were 53 housing units at an average density of 282.9 per square mile (109.2/km^{2}). The racial makeup of the city was 100.00% White. Hispanic or Latino of any race were 2.04% of the population.

There were 47 households, out of which 36.2% had children under the age of 18 living with them, 31.9% were married couples living together, 23.4% had a female householder with no husband present, and 42.6% were non-families. 42.6% of all households were made up of individuals, and 8.5% had someone living alone who was 65 years of age or older. The average household size was 2.09 and the average family size was 2.85.

In the city, the population was spread out, with 31.6% under the age of 18, 5.1% from 18 to 24, 31.6% from 25 to 44, 23.5% from 45 to 64, and 8.2% who were 65 years of age or older. The median age was 34 years. For every 100 females, there were 104.2 males. For every 100 females age 18 and over, there were 97.1 males.

The median income for a household in the city was $17,292, and the median income for a family was $23,125. Males had a median income of $26,250 versus $14,688 for females. The per capita income for the city was $12,636. There were 19.0% of families and 23.8% of the population living below the poverty line, including 43.5% of under eighteen and none of those over 64.

== Gallery ==
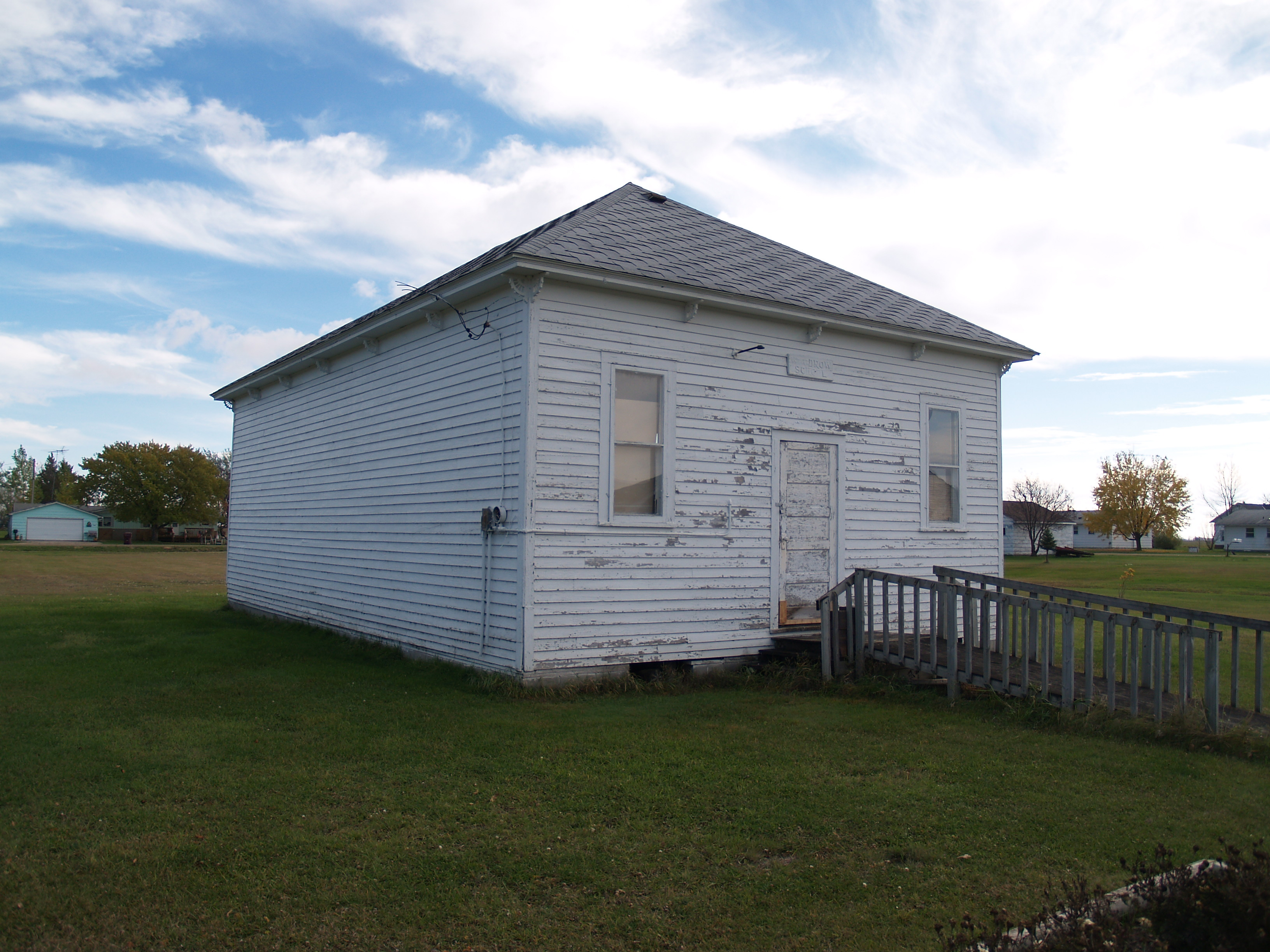
Woodrow School Museum

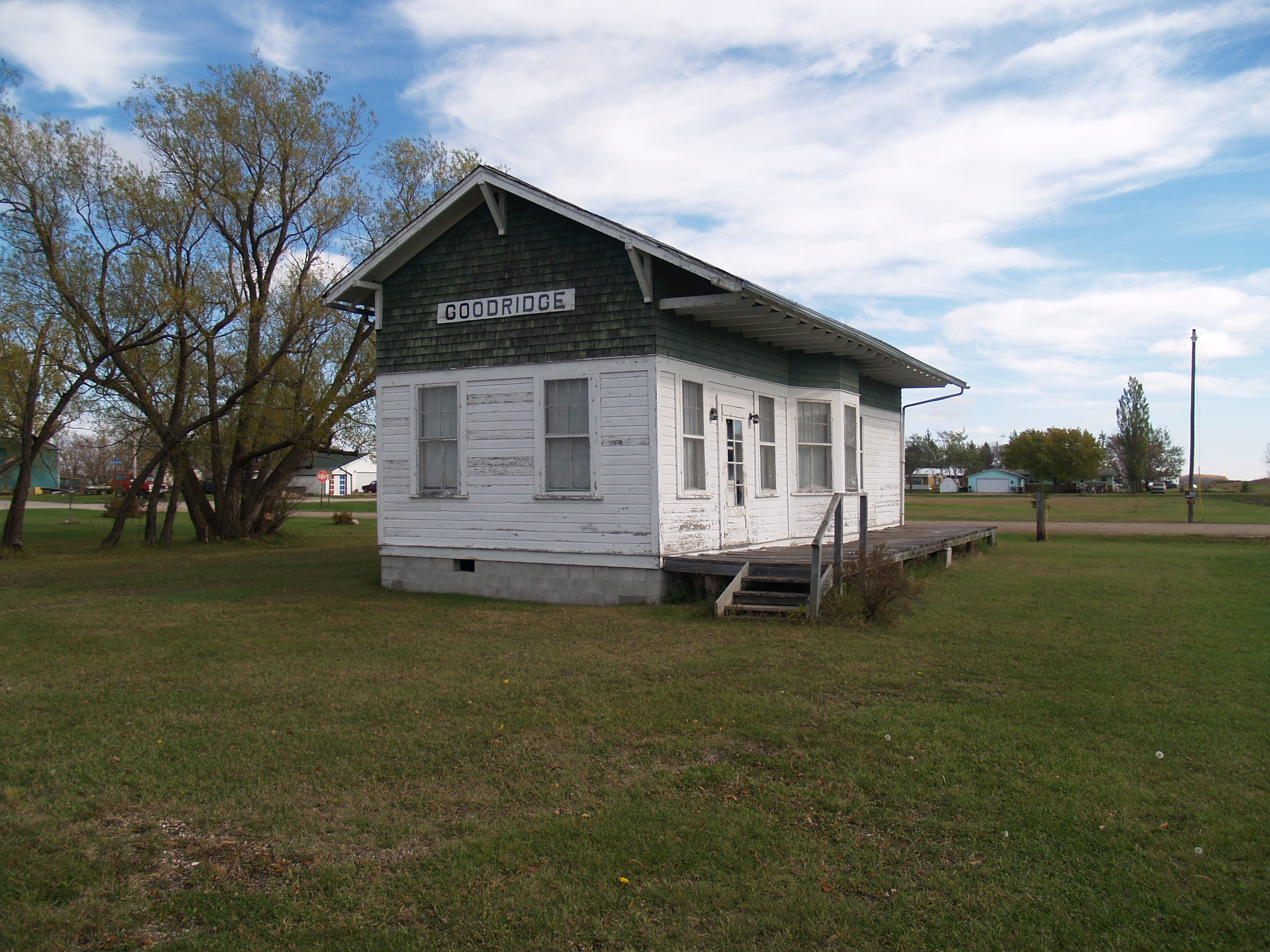
Depot Museum

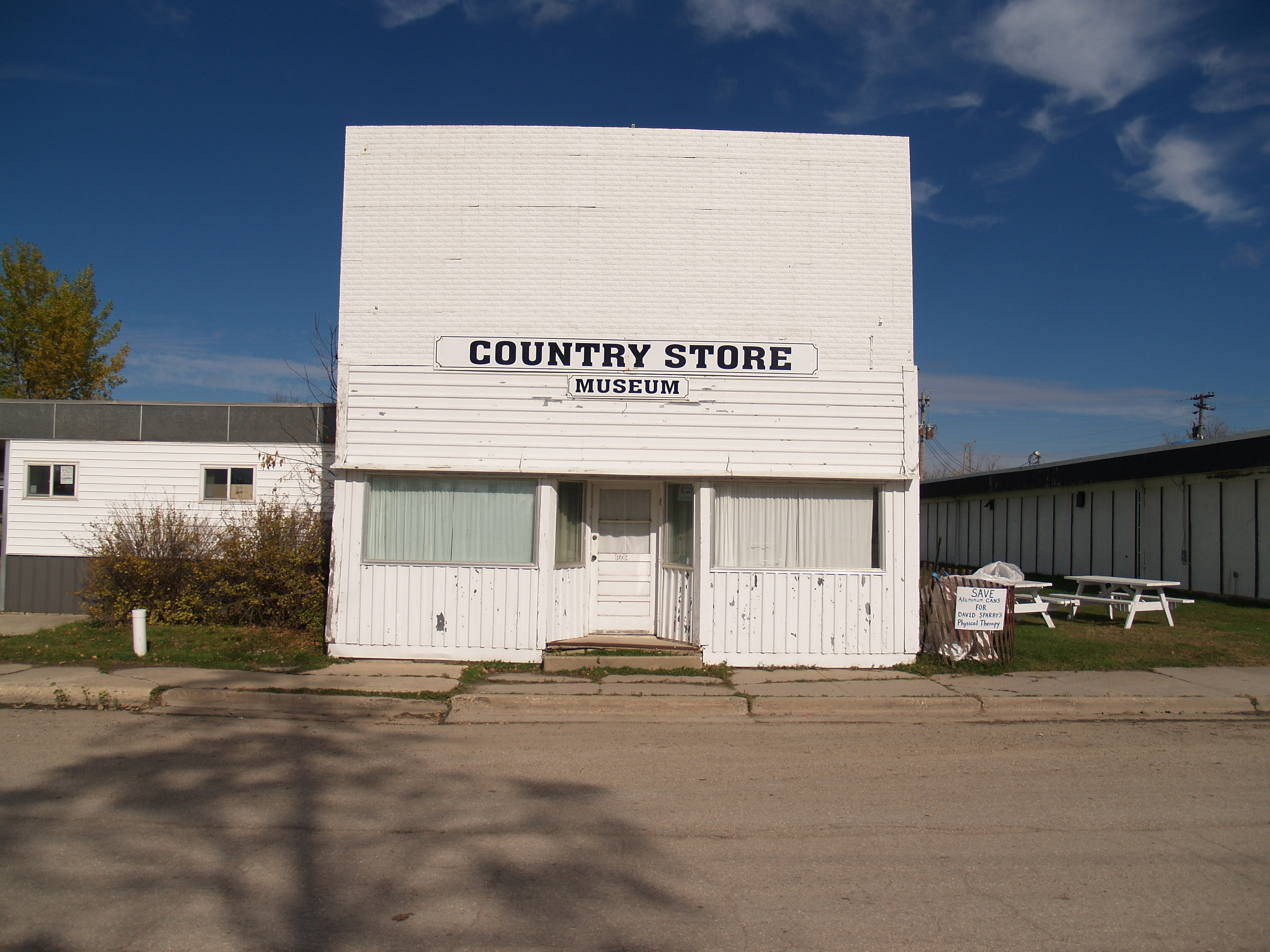
Country Store Museum

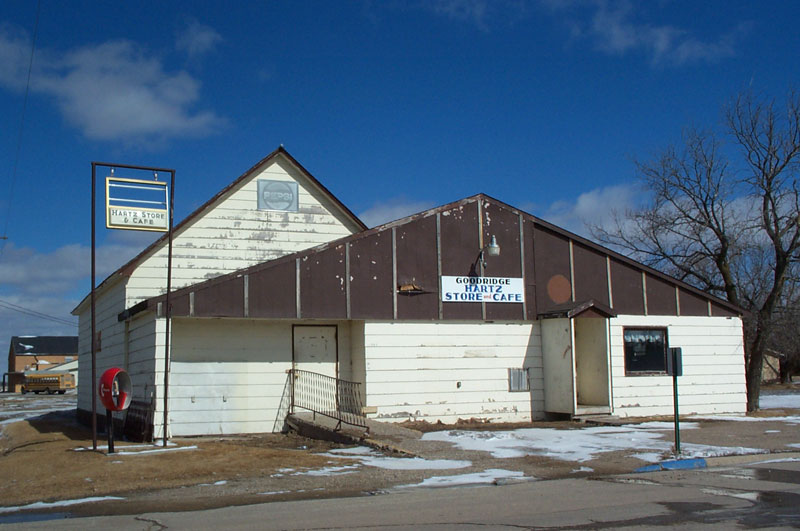
Store and cafe
