= Wyandotte Township, Pennington County, Minnesota =

Wyandotte Township, Minnesota
- Township
- Location of Wyandotte Township, within Pennington County, Minnesota
- Coordinates: 47°59′9″N 96°2′21″W
- Country: United States
- State: Minnesota
- County: Pennington

Area
  - Total: 22.6 sq mi (58.6 km^{2})
  - Land: 22.6 sq mi (58.6 km^{2})
  - Water: 0 sq mi (0.0 km^{2})
- Elevation: 1,125 ft (343 m)

Population (2020)
  - Total: 92
  - Density: 4.1/sq mi (1.6/km^{2})
- Time zone: UTC-6 (Central (CST))
  - Summer (DST): UTC-5 (CDT)
- FIPS code: 27-71878
- GNIS feature ID: 0666059

Wyandotte Township is a township in Pennington County, Minnesota, United States. The population was 92 at the 2020 census.

The township was named after the Wyandot people.

== Geography ==
According to the United States Census Bureau, the township has a total area of 22.6 square miles (58.6 km^{2}), all land.

== Demographics ==
As of the census of 2000, there were 101 people, 38 households, and 31 families residing in the township. The population density was 4.5 people per square mile (1.7/km^{2}). There were 46 housing units at an average density of 2.0/sq mi (0.8/km^{2}). The racial makeup of the township was 95.05% White, 0.99% Native American, 0.99% Asian, and 2.97% from two or more races.

There were 38 households, out of which 36.8% had children under the age of 18 living with them, 57.9% were married couples living together, 15.8% had a female householder with no husband present, and 15.8% were non-families. 13.2% of all households were made up of individuals, and none had someone living alone who was 65 years of age or older. The average household size was 2.66 and the average family size was 2.84.

In the township the population was spread out, with 23.8% under the age of 18, 10.9% from 18 to 24, 27.7% from 25 to 44, 24.8% from 45 to 64, and 12.9% who were 65 years of age or older. The median age was 40 years. For every 100 females, there were 140.5 males. For every 100 females age 18 and over, there were 156.7 males.

The median income for a household in the township was $39,583, and the median income for a family was $43,750. Males had a median income of $33,125 versus $16,250 for females. The per capita income for the township was $23,144. There were 5.9% of families and 4.0% of the population living below the poverty line, including no under eighteens and 13.3% of those over 64.
