= Highlanding Township, Pennington County, Minnesota =

Highlanding Township, Minnesota
- Township
- Location of Highlanding Township, within Pennington County, Minnesota
- Coordinates: 48°3′24″N 95°47′13″W
- Country: United States
- State: Minnesota
- County: Pennington

Area
  - Total: 36.2 sq mi (93.7 km^{2})
  - Land: 36.1 sq mi (93.6 km^{2})
  - Water: 0.039 sq mi (0.1 km^{2})
- Elevation: 1,161 ft (354 m)

Population (2020)
  - Total: 202
  - Density: 5.59/sq mi (2.16/km^{2})
- Time zone: UTC-6 (Central (CST))
  - Summer (DST): UTC-5 (CDT)
- FIPS code: 27-29024
- GNIS feature ID: 0664471

Highlanding Township is a township in Pennington County, Minnesota, United States. The population was 202 at the 2020 census.

== Geography ==
According to the United States Census Bureau, the township has a total area of 36.2 square miles (94 km^{2}), of which 36.1 square miles (93 km^{2}) is land and 0.04 square miles (0.10 km^{2}) (0.11%) is water.

== Demographics ==
At the 2000 census, there were 192 people, 69 households and 50 families residing in the township. The population density was 5.3 per square mile (2.0/km^{2}). There were 80 housing units at an average density of 2.2 per square mile (0.85/km^{2}). The racial make-up was 99.48% White and 0.52% African American.

There were 69 households, of which 40.6% had children under the age of 18 living with them, 63.8% were married couples living together, 4.3% had a female householder with no husband present, and 27.5% were non-families. 21.7% of all households were made up of individuals, and 10.1% had someone living alone who was 65 years of age or older. The average household size was 2.78 and the average family size was 3.36.

31.8% of the population were under the age of 18, 11.5% from 18 to 24, 25.5% from 25 to 44, 20.8% from 45 to 64 and 10.4% who were 65 years of age or older. The median age was 29 years. For every 100 females, there were 95.9 males. For every 100 females age 18 and over, there were 111.3 males.

The median household income was $34,688 and the median family income was $50,625. Males had a median income of $31,875 and females $14,583. The per capita income was $21,464. None of the families and 2.6% of the population were living below the poverty line.
