= St. Hilaire, Minnesota =

City in Minnesota, United States

St. Hilaire
- City
- Location of St. Hilaire, Minnesota

- Location in the United States
- Coordinates: 48°0′47″N 96°12′51″W
- Country: United States
- State: Minnesota
- County: Pennington
- Founded: Incorporated
- 1882: July 4, 1883

Area
  - Total: 0.84 sq mi (2.18 km^{2})
  - Land: 0.78 sq mi (2.03 km^{2})
  - Water: 0.062 sq mi (0.16 km^{2})
- Elevation: 1,089 ft (332 m)

Population (2020)
  - Total: 273
  - Estimate (2021): 266
  - Density: 349.1/sq mi (134.77/km^{2})
- Time zone: UTC-6 (CST)
  - Summer (DST): UTC-5 (CDT)
- ZIP code: 56754
- Area code: 218
- FIPS code: 27-57022
- GNIS feature ID: 0650607

St. Hilaire is a city in section 6 of River Falls Township in Pennington County, Minnesota, United States. The population was 273 at the 2020 census.

== History ==
St. Hilaire was platted in 1882 and incorporated as a village on the auspicious date of July 4, 1883. Also on that date, St. Hilaire had rail service for the first time, as the Great Northern Railway opened a branch line from Crookston, Minnesota through Shirley, seven miles north of Crookston, Dorothy and Ives Station, to St. Hilaire.

St. Hilaire received its name in one of three ways:

- A Frenchman named St. Hilaire lived in a shack by the Red Lake River, selling items like gunpowder and tobacco, and when an item was needed, residents would "go to St. Hilaire" for it, and the name stuck.
- A Frenchman named Arthur Yvernault bought land on which the townsite was then platted and named for his hometown in France.
- It was named by Hon. Frank Ives for the French Statesman and author Jules Barthélemy-Saint-Hilaire, who was born in Paris, August 19, 1805, and died November 24, 1895. Frank Ives was a judge in Crookston, MN, which was the county seat of Polk County (of which Pennington was then a part) and his son, Harry Ives, was the postmaster when the St. Hilaire post office began in 1882 while still part of Polk County. Frank Ives owned land in St. Hilaire, but never lived there. This third possibility was favored by historian Warren Upham, and by extension by the Minnesota Historical Society.

Harry Ives was also the publisher of the St. Hilaire Spectator, the first newspaper to serve this community. The Spectator was published from 1883 to 1942, when it closed and sold its subscription list to the Thief River Falls Times.

== Geography ==
According to the United States Census Bureau, the city has a total area of 0.83 square miles (2.15 km^{2}), of which 0.77 square miles (1.99 km^{2}) is land and 0.06 square miles (0.16 km^{2}) is water.

== Demographics ==
Historical population
Census	Pop.	Note	%±
1890	193		—
1900	840		335.2%
1910	468		−44.3%
1920	346		−26.1%
1930	280		−19.1%
1940	288		2.9%
1950	276		−4.2%
1960	270		−2.2%
1970	337		24.8%
1980	388		15.1%
1990	298		−23.2%
2000	272		−8.7%
2010	279		2.6%
2020	273		−2.2%
2021 (est.)	266		−2.6%
U.S. Decennial Census; 2020 Census

=== 2010 census ===
As of the census of 2010, there were 279 people, 123 households, and 71 families living in the city. The population density was 362.3 inhabitants per square mile (139.9/km^{2}). There were 131 housing units at an average density of 170.1 per square mile (65.7/km^{2}). The racial makeup of the city was 97.8% White, 1.1% Native American, 0.7% from other races, and 0.4% from two or more races. Hispanic or Latino of any race were 1.4% of the population.

There were 123 households, of which 30.9% had children under the age of 18 living with them, 43.1% were married couples living together, 6.5% had a female householder with no husband present, 8.1% had a male householder with no wife present, and 42.3% were non-families. 32.5% of all households were made up of individuals, and 8.2% had someone living alone who was 65 years of age or older. The average household size was 2.27 and the average family size was 2.87.

The median age in the city was 37.1 years. 25.1% of residents were under the age of 18; 9.7% were between the ages of 18 and 24; 22.9% were from 25 to 44; 30.9% were from 45 to 64; and 11.5% were 65 years of age or older. The gender makeup of the city was 53.0% male and 47.0% female.

=== 2000 census ===
As of the census of 2000, there were 272 people, 121 households, and 68 families living in the city. The population density was 354.0 inhabitants per square mile (136.7/km^{2}). There were 127 housing units at an average density of 165.3 per square mile (63.8/km^{2}). The racial makeup of the city was 98.53% White, and 1.47% from two or more races.

There were 121 households, out of which 32.2% had children under the age of 18 living with them, 36.4% were married couples living together, 13.2% had a female householder with no husband present, and 43.0% were non-families. 33.9% of all households were made up of individuals, and 8.3% had someone living alone who was 65 years of age or older. The average household size was 2.25 and the average family size was 2.88.

In the city, the population was spread out, with 26.5% under the age of 18, 11.8% from 18 to 24, 30.5% from 25 to 44, 23.5% from 45 to 64, and 7.7% who were 65 years of age or older. The median age was 34 years. For every 100 females, there were 106.1 males. For every 100 females age 18 and over, there were 98.0 males.

The median income for a household in the city was $26,250, and the median income for a family was $37,143. Males had a median income of $27,188 versus $19,583 for females. The per capita income for the city was $13,317. About 3.3% of families and 14.1% of the population were below the poverty line, including 3.2% of those under the age of eighteen and 40.0% of those 65 or over.
