= Silverton Township, Pennington County, Minnesota =

Silverton Township, Minnesota
- Township
- Location of Silverton Township, within Pennington County, Minnesota
- Coordinates: 48°8′35″N 96°3′28″W
- Country: United States
- State: Minnesota
- County: Pennington

Area
  - Total: 26.6 sq mi (69.0 km^{2})
  - Land: 26.6 sq mi (69.0 km^{2})
  - Water: 0 sq mi (0.0 km^{2})
- Elevation: 1,145 ft (349 m)

Population (2020)
  - Total: 187
  - Density: 7.02/sq mi (2.71/km^{2})
- Time zone: UTC-6 (Central (CST))
  - Summer (DST): UTC-5 (CDT)
- FIPS code: 27-60448
- GNIS feature ID: 0665618

Silverton Township is a township in Pennington County, Minnesota, United States. The population was 187 at the 2020 census.

== Geography ==
According to the United States Census Bureau, the township has a total area of 26.6 square miles (69.0 km^{2}), all land.

== Demographics ==
As of the census of 2000, there were 182 people, 71 households, and 50 families residing in the township. The population density was 6.8 people per square mile (2.6/km^{2}). There were 79 housing units at an average density of 3.0/sq mi (1.1/km^{2}). The racial makeup of the township was 100.00% White.

There were 71 households, out of which 33.8% had children under the age of 18 living with them, 64.8% were married couples living together, 4.2% had a female householder with no husband present, and 28.2% were non-families. 22.5% of all households were made up of individuals, and 7.0% had someone living alone who was 65 years of age or older. The average household size was 2.56 and the average family size was 3.06.

In the township the population was spread out, with 26.4% under the age of 18, 8.2% from 18 to 24, 28.6% from 25 to 44, 29.7% from 45 to 64, and 7.1% who were 65 years of age or older. The median age was 38 years. For every 100 females, there were 127.5 males. For every 100 females age 18 and over, there were 127.1 males.

The median income for a household in the township was $42,917, and the median income for a family was $48,929. Males had a median income of $26,875 versus $21,250 for females. The per capita income for the township was $15,265. About 7.7% of families and 5.4% of the population were below the poverty line, including none of those under the age of eighteen and 18.8% of those 65 or over.
