= Deer Park Township, Pennington County, Minnesota =

Deer Park Township, Minnesota
- Township
- Location of Deer Park Township, within Pennington County, Minnesota
- Coordinates: 47°59′11″N 95°47′10″W
- Country: United States
- State: Minnesota
- County: Pennington

Area
  - Total: 23.1 sq mi (59.7 km^{2})
  - Land: 23.1 sq mi (59.7 km^{2})
  - Water: 0 sq mi (0.0 km^{2})
- Elevation: 1,158 ft (353 m)

Population (2020)
  - Total: 128
  - Density: 5.55/sq mi (2.14/km^{2})
- Time zone: UTC-6 (Central (CST))
  - Summer (DST): UTC-5 (CDT)
- FIPS code: 27-15292
- GNIS feature ID: 0663947

Deer Park Township is a township in Pennington County, Minnesota, United States. The population was 128 at the 2020 census.

Deer Park Township was so named from the fact deer was often hunted within its borders.

== Geography ==
According to the United States Census Bureau, the township has a total area of 23.0 square miles (60 km^{2}), all land.

== Demographics ==
As of the census of 2000, there were 130 people, 43 households, and 31 families residing in the township. The population density was 5.6 inhabitants per square mile (2.2/km^{2}). There were 50 housing units at an average density of 2.2 per square mile (0.85/km^{2}). The racial makeup of the township was 99.23% White and 0.77% Asian.

There were 43 households, out of which 30.2% had children under the age of 18 living with them, 65.1% were married couples living together, 7.0% had a female householder with no husband present, and 25.6% were non-families. 20.9% of all households were made up of individuals, and 16.3% had someone living alone who was 65 years of age or older. The average household size was 3.02 and the average family size was 3.41.

In the township the population was spread out, with 30.8% under the age of 18, 4.6% from 18 to 24, 25.4% from 25 to 44, 22.3% from 45 to 64, and 16.9% who were 65 years of age or older. The median age was 41 years. For every 100 females, there were 116.7 males. For every 100 females age 18 and over, there were 104.5 males.

The median income for a household in the township was $38,750, and the median income for a family was $47,000. Males had a median income of $24,167 versus $18,750 for females. The per capita income for the township was $13,216. There were no families and 3.1% of the population living below the poverty line, including no under eighteens and 28.6% of those over 64.
