= Goodridge Township, Pennington County, Minnesota =

Goodridge Township, Minnesota
- Township
- Location of Goodridge Township, within Pennington County, Minnesota
- Coordinates: 48°8′27″N 95°47′55″W
- Country: United States
- State: Minnesota
- County: Pennington

Area
  - Total: 26.8 sq mi (69.4 km^{2})
  - Land: 26.8 sq mi (69.4 km^{2})
  - Water: 0 sq mi (0.0 km^{2})
- Elevation: 1,168 ft (356 m)

Population (2020)
  - Total: 79
  - Density: 2.9/sq mi (1.1/km^{2})
- Time zone: UTC-6 (Central (CST))
  - Summer (DST): UTC-5 (CDT)
- ZIP code: 56725
- Area code: 218
- FIPS code: 27-24488
- GNIS feature ID: 0664295

Goodridge Township is a township in Pennington County, Minnesota, United States. The population was 79 at the 2020 census. the city of Goodridge is located within the township, but is politically independent.

== Geography ==
According to the United States Census Bureau, the township has a total area of 26.8 square miles (69 km^{2}), all land.

== Demographics ==
As of the census of 2000, there were 54 people, 23 households, and 16 families residing in the township. The population density was 2.0 inhabitants per square mile (0.77/km^{2}). There were 27 housing units at an average density of 1.0 per square mile (0.39/km^{2}). The racial makeup of the township was 96.30% White, 1.85% from other races, and 1.85% from two or more races. Hispanic or Latino of any race were 3.70% of the population.

There were 23 households, out of which 34.8% had children under the age of 18 living with them, 56.5% were married couples living together, 13.0% had a female householder with no husband present, and 26.1% were non-families. 21.7% of all households were made up of individuals, and 13.0% had someone living alone who was 65 years of age or older. The average household size was 2.35 and the average family size was 2.59.

In the township the population was spread out, with 22.2% under the age of 18, 3.7% from 18 to 24, 25.9% from 25 to 44, 29.6% from 45 to 64, and 18.5% who were 65 years of age or older. The median age was 44 years. For every 100 females, there were 134.8 males. For every 100 females age 18 and over, there were 121.1 males.

The median income for a household in the township was $21,875, and the median income for a family was $21,250. Males had a median income of $8,750 versus $12,083 for females. The per capita income for the township was $13,643. There were 42.9% of families and 45.1% of the population living below the poverty line, including 63.6% of under eighteens and 37.5% of those over 64.
