= Camp Lake =

Camp Lake may refer to:

== Lakes ==
- Camp Lake (Alaska), a lake on Baranof Island in the Alaskan Panhandle
- Camp Lake (Antarctica)
- Camp Lake (California), a lake in Tuolumne County, California
- Camp Lake (Idaho), a glacial lake in Elmore County, Idaho
- Camp Lake (Oregon), an alpine lake in the Cascade Range
- Camp Lake (Swift County, Minnesota) a lake in Minnesota
- Lake Camp, a lake adjacent to Lake Clearwater in New Zealand
- Sugar Camp Lake, a lake in Oneida County, Wisconsin
- Camp Lake (Manitoba)

== Communities ==
- Camp Lake Township, Minnesota, a township in Swift County, Minnesota
- Camp Lake, Wisconsin, a census-designated place in Kenosha County, Wisconsin
- Camp A Lake, Minnesota, an unorganized territory in St. Louis County, Minnesota

== Other ==
- Camp Lake National Wildlife Refuge, located in North Dakota
