= Sugar Camp =

Sugar Camp may refer to the following places:

- Sugar Camp, Wisconsin, a town in Oneida County
- Sugar Camp (community), Wisconsin, an unincorporated community in Oneida County
- Sugar Camp Lake, a lake in Oneida County, Wisconsin
