= Frovold Lake =

Lake in the state of Minnesota, United States

- Location within Minnesota Location within the United States
- Location: Swift County, Minnesota
- Coordinates: 45°22′38″N 95°33′46″W
- Type: lake
- Basin countries: United States
- Surface elevation: 1,047 ft (319 m)

Frovold Lake is a lake in Swift County, in the U.S. state of Minnesota.

Frovold Lake was named for Knut P. Frovold, a pioneer settler.

== See also ==
- List of lakes in Minnesota
