= Pomme de Terre River (Minnesota) =

River in Minnesota, United States

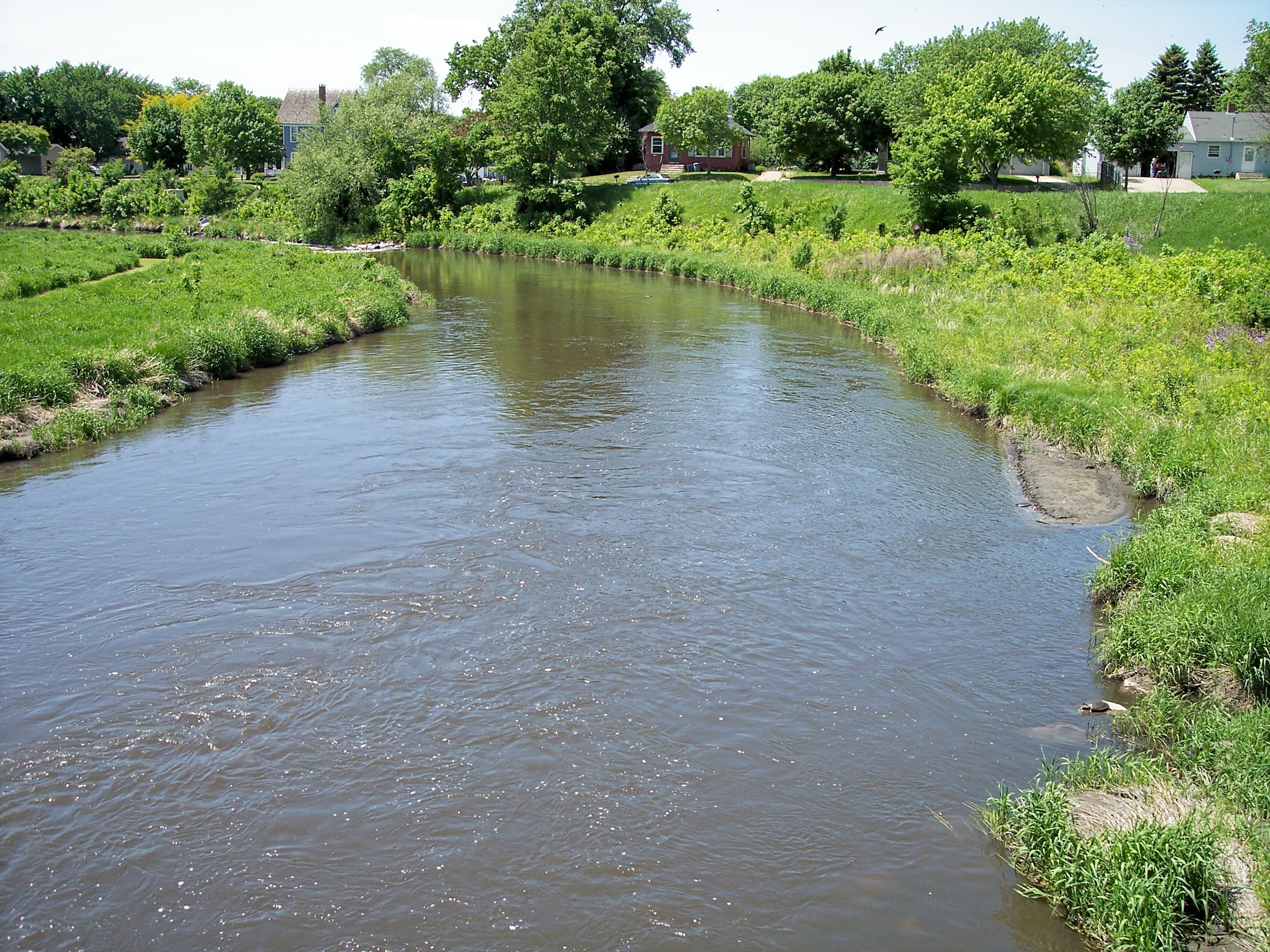
- The Pomme de Terre River in Appleton in 2007

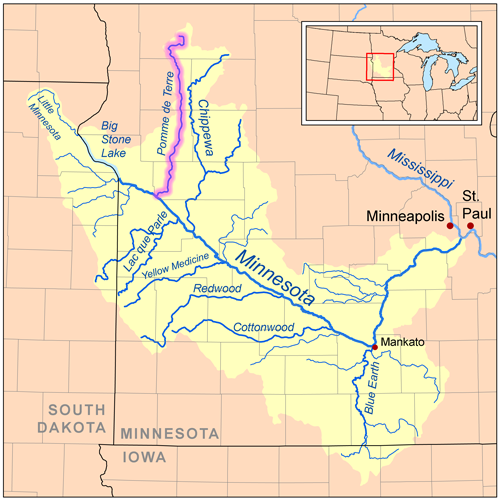

Location
- Country: United States
- State: Minnesota

Physical characteristics
- Source: Stalker Lake
  - location: Tordenskjold Township, Otter Tail County
  - coordinates: 46°11′55″N 95°51′20″W
  - elevation: 1,283 ft (391 m)
- Mouth: Minnesota River
  - location: Appleton Township, Swift County
  - coordinates: 45°10′33″N 96°05′13″W
  - elevation: 935 ft (285 m)
- Length: 124.5 mi (200.4 km)
- Basin size: 875 mi^{2} (2,270 km^{2})
- Discharge
  - location: Appleton
  - average: 132 cu ft/s (3.7 m^{3}/s)
  - minimum: 0 cu ft/s (0 m^{3}/s)
  - maximum: 8,890 cu ft/s (252 m^{3}/s)

The Pomme de Terre River is a 125-mile-long (201 km) tributary of the Minnesota River in western Minnesota in the United States. Via the Minnesota River, it is part of the watershed of the Mississippi River, draining an area of 875 square miles (2,270 km^{2}) in an agricultural region. The headwaters region of the Pomme de Terre River is the northernmost extremity of the Minnesota River's watershed.

== Etymology ==
The name Pomme de Terre is French and means literally "soil apple," usually meaning "potato." In this case, the river was named by early French explorers for a different root vegetable, the potato-like prairie turnip (Pediomelum esculentum, syn. Psoralea esculenta), which was commonly eaten by the Sioux. Similarly, the traditional Dakota name for this river is Owóbopte Wakpá, or the prairie-digging river.

== Geography ==
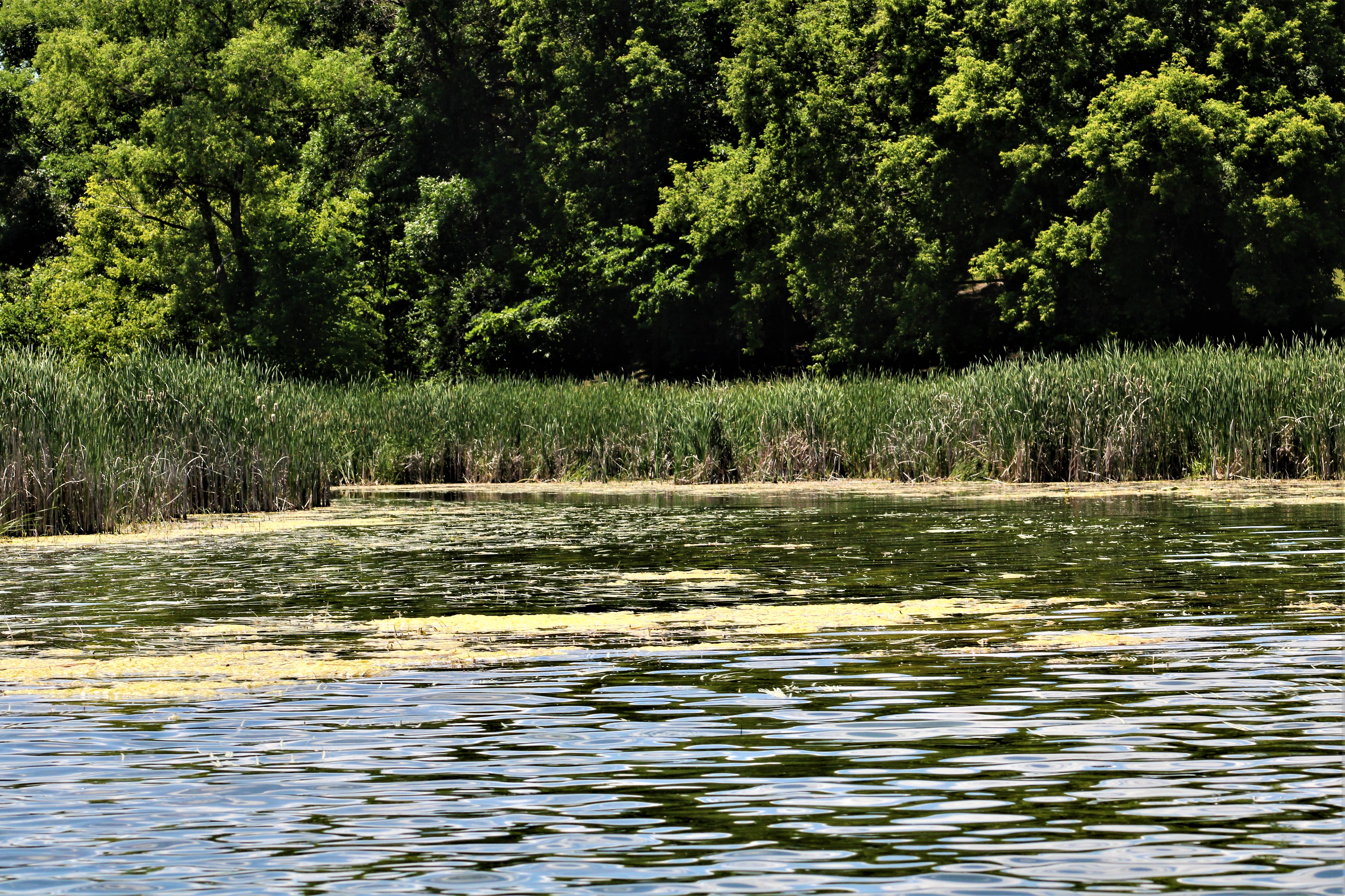
The source of the Pomme de Terre at Stalker Lake.

The Pomme de Terre River issues from Stalker Lake in Tordenskjold Township, approximately three miles (4.8 km) northeast of Dalton in southern Otter Tail County, and flows generally southwardly through eastern Grant and Stevens Counties and western Swift County, through the cities of Barrett, Morris, and Appleton. It flows into Marsh Lake on the Minnesota River in southwestern Swift County, approximately four miles (6.4 km) southwest of Appleton. Marsh Lake was formed by a backup of water caused by the Pomme de Terre's delta, and is presently maintained by a manmade dam.

In its upper course the river flows through a morainic region of numerous lakes, in a course characterized by meadows and wooded hills, as well as marshy stretches near areas where the river passes through lakes. The largest lakes on the river include Ten Mile Lake in Otter Tail County; Pomme de Terre and Barrett Lakes in Grant County; and Perkins Lake in Stevens County. The water levels of several lakes on the river's course are maintained by small dams. Downstream of Morris, the river flows on till plains between eroding banks and becomes increasingly turbid. According to the Minnesota Pollution Control Agency, approximately 81% of the land in the Pomme de Terre River's watershed is used for agriculture; of this area, half is used for the cultivation of corn and soybeans, and 43% for that of hay and small grains.

== Flow rate ==
At the United States Geological Survey's stream gauge in Appleton, eight miles (13 km) upstream from the river's mouth, the annual mean flow of the river between 1931 and 2005 was 132 cubic feet per second (3.7 cubic metres per second). The highest recorded flow during the period, resulting in part from a dam failure, was 8,890 cu ft/s (252 m^{3}/s) on April 7, 1997. Readings of zero were recorded on numerous days during several years.

== See also ==
- List of rivers in Minnesota
