= Edison Township =

Edison Township may refer to the following townships in the United States:

- Edison Township, Swift County, Minnesota
- Edison Township, New Jersey, in Middlesex County
