= Hayes Township, Swift County, Minnesota =

Hayes Township, Minnesota
- Township
- Location within the state of Minnesota Hayes Township, Minnesota (the United States)
- Coordinates: 45°17′5″N 95°18′27″W
- Country: United States
- State: Minnesota
- County: Swift

Area
  - Total: 35.9 sq mi (93.0 km^{2})
  - Land: 34.9 sq mi (90.3 km^{2})
  - Water: 1.0 sq mi (2.7 km^{2})
- Elevation: 1,158 ft (353 m)

Population (2000)
  - Total: 221
  - Density: 6.2/sq mi (2.4/km^{2})
- Time zone: UTC-6 (Central (CST))
  - Summer (DST): UTC-5 (CDT)
- FIPS code: 27-27854
- GNIS feature ID: 0664423

Hayes Township is a township in Swift County, Minnesota, United States. The population was 221 at the 2000 census.

Hayes Township was organized in 1877, and named for Rutherford B. Hayes, 19th President of the United States (1877–1881).

== Geography ==
According to the United States Census Bureau, the township has a total area of 35.9 square miles (93 km^{2}), of which 34.9 square miles (90 km^{2}) is land and 1.0 square mile (2.6 km^{2}) (2.87%) is water.

== Demographics ==
As of the census of 2000, there were 221 people, 85 households, and 69 families residing in the township. The population density was 6.3 inhabitants per square mile (2.4/km^{2}). There were 93 housing units at an average density of 2.7 per square mile (1.0/km^{2}). The racial makeup of the township was 100.00% White.

There were 85 households, out of which 34.1% had children under the age of 18 living with them, 77.6% were married couples living together, and 18.8% were non-families. 15.3% of all households were made up of individuals, and 3.5% had someone living alone who was 65 years of age or older. The average household size was 2.60 and the average family size was 2.90.

In the township the population was spread out, with 24.4% under the age of 18, 5.4% from 18 to 24, 27.6% from 25 to 44, 24.9% from 45 to 64, and 17.6% who were 65 years of age or older. The median age was 41 years. For every 100 females, there were 104.6 males. For every 100 females age 18 and over, there were 119.7 males.

The median income for a household in the township was $39,583, and the median income for a family was $44,643. Males had a median income of $30,625 versus $21,607 for females. The per capita income for the township was $29,279. About 6.1% of families and 10.8% of the population were below the poverty line, including 5.6% of those under the age of eighteen and 5.9% of those 65 or over.
