= Swenoda Township, Swift County, Minnesota =

Swenoda Township, Minnesota
- Township
- Location within the state of Minnesota Swenoda Township, Minnesota (the United States)
- Coordinates: 45°12′8″N 95°40′44″W
- Country: United States
- State: Minnesota
- County: Swift

Area
  - Total: 35.8 sq mi (92.7 km^{2})
  - Land: 35.8 sq mi (92.7 km^{2})
  - Water: 0 sq mi (0.0 km^{2})
- Elevation: 1,027 ft (313 m)

Population (2000)
  - Total: 159
  - Density: 4.4/sq mi (1.7/km^{2})
- Time zone: UTC-6 (Central (CST))
  - Summer (DST): UTC-5 (CDT)
- FIPS code: 27-63904
- GNIS feature ID: 0665756

Swenoda Township is a township in Swift County, Minnesota, United States. The population was 159 at the 2000 census.

== History ==
Swenoda Township was organized in 1873. Swenoda is a portmanteau of Swedish, Norwegian, and Danish, commemorating the nationalities of the pioneers who first settled in the area.

== Geography ==
According to the United States Census Bureau, the township has a total area of 35.8 square miles (92.7 km^{2}), all land.

== Demographics ==
As of the census of 2000, there were 159 people, 53 households, and 44 families residing in the township. The population density was 4.4 people per square mile (1.7/km^{2}). There were 58 housing units at an average density of 1.6/sq mi (0.6/km^{2}). The racial makeup of the township was 100.00% White.

There were 53 households, out of which 41.5% had children under the age of 18 living with them, 73.6% were married couples living together, 7.5% had a female householder with no husband present, and 15.1% were non-families. 15.1% of all households were made up of individuals, and 5.7% had someone living alone who was 65 years of age or older. The average household size was 3.00 and the average family size was 3.31.

In the township the population was spread out, with 32.1% under the age of 18, 9.4% from 18 to 24, 25.8% from 25 to 44, 20.8% from 45 to 64, and 11.9% who were 65 years of age or older. The median age was 34 years. For every 100 females, there were 123.9 males. For every 100 females age 18 and over, there were 120.4 males.

The median income for a household in the township was $50,179, and the median income for a family was $51,607. Males had a median income of $36,458 versus $16,607 for females. The per capita income for the township was $32,557. None of the families and 1.4% of the population were living below the poverty line, including no under eighteens and 10.5% of those over 64.
