= Sugar Camp (community), Wisconsin =

Sugar Camp, Wisconsin
- Unincorporated community
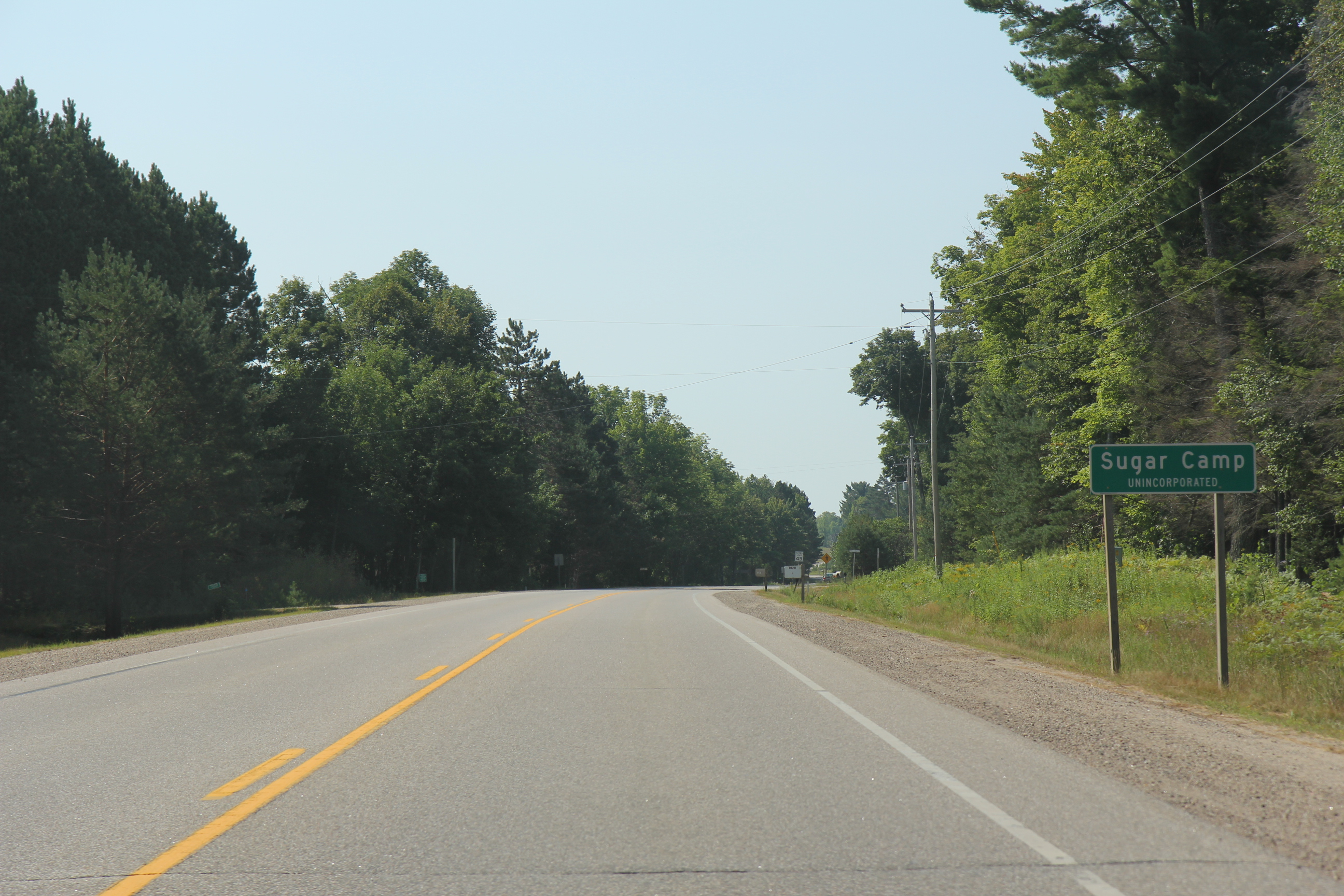
- The sign for Sugar Camp, Wisconsin on WIS17

- Location within Wisconsin Location within the United States
- Coordinates: 45°47′40″N 89°18′50″W
- Country: United States
- State: Wisconsin
- County: Oneida
- Elevation: 1,660 ft (510 m)
- Time zone: UTC-6 (Central (CST))
  - Summer (DST): UTC-5 (CDT)
- Area codes: 715 & 534
- GNIS feature ID: 1575015

Sugar Camp is an unincorporated community located in the town of Sugar Camp, Oneida County, Wisconsin, United States. Sugar Camp is located on Sugar Camp Lake along Wisconsin Highway 17, 11.5 miles (18.5 km) north-northeast of Rhinelander.

== Images ==
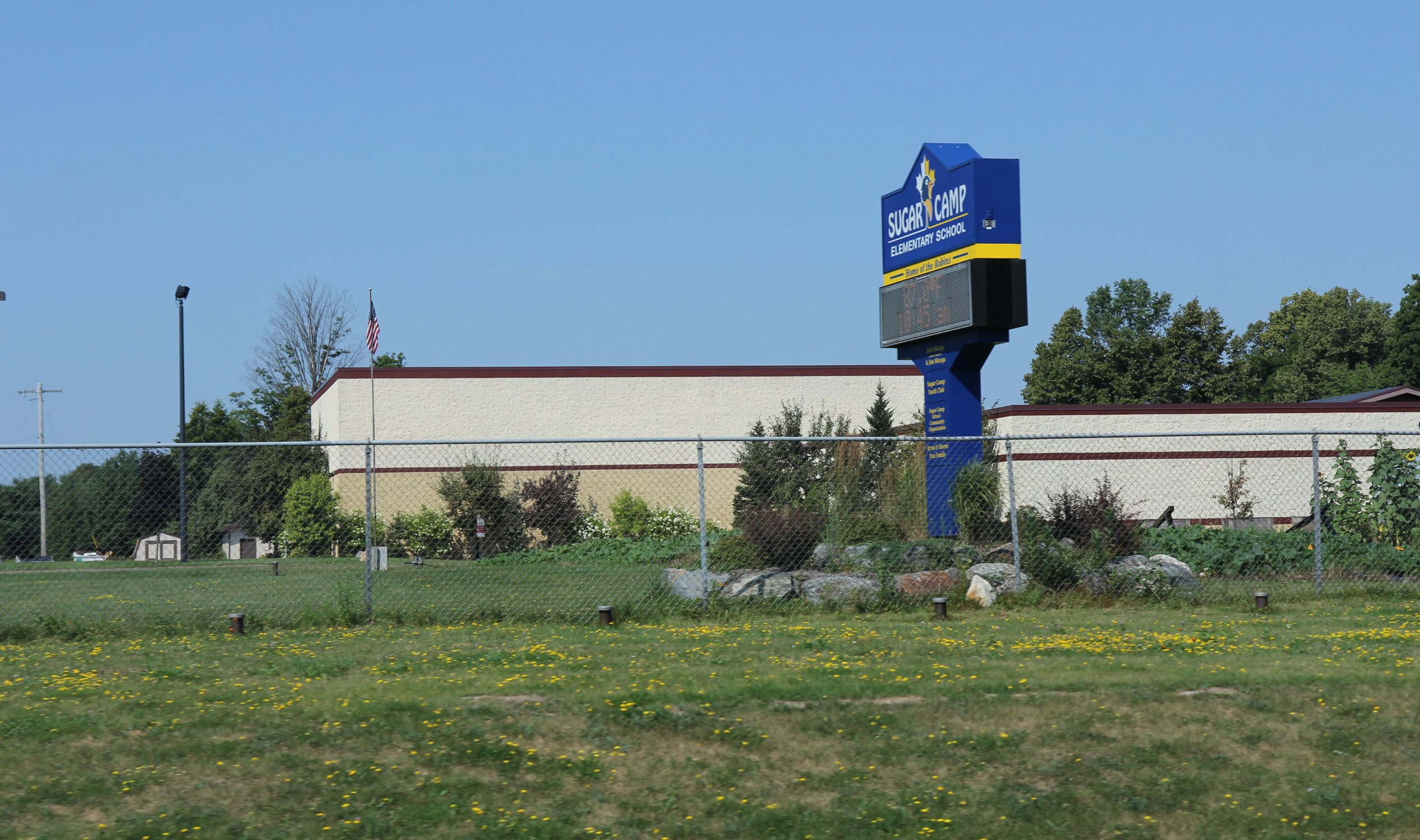
Sugar Camp Elementary School

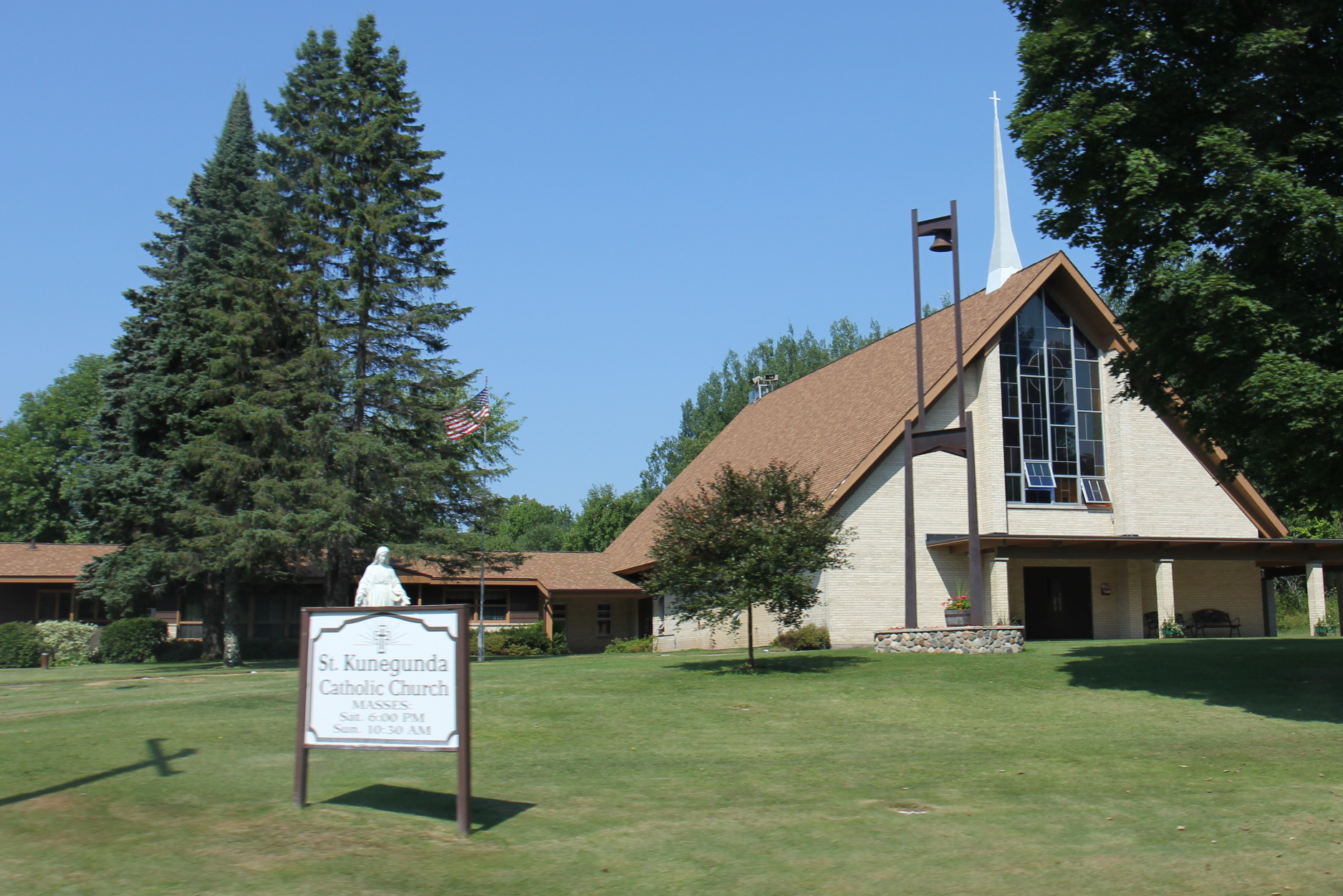
St. Kunegunda Catholic Church
