= Kerkhoven Township, Swift County, Minnesota =

Kerkhoven Township, Minnesota
- Township
- Location within the state of Minnesota Kerkhoven Township, Minnesota (the United States)
- Coordinates: 45°21′51″N 95°19′47″W
- Country: United States
- State: Minnesota
- County: Swift

Area
  - Total: 35.9 sq mi (93.1 km^{2})
  - Land: 35.5 sq mi (91.9 km^{2})
  - Water: 0.46 sq mi (1.2 km^{2})
- Elevation: 1,191 ft (363 m)

Population (2000)
  - Total: 286
  - Density: 8.0/sq mi (3.1/km^{2})
- Time zone: UTC-6 (Central (CST))
  - Summer (DST): UTC-5 (CDT)
- ZIP code: 56252
- Area code: 320
- FIPS code: 27-32894
- GNIS feature ID: 0664619

Kerkhoven Township (/ˈkɜːrkhoʊvən/ KURK-hoh-vən) is a township in Swift County, Minnesota, United States. The population was 286 at the 2000 census.

Settled in the 1860s, Kerkhoven Township was named for a railroad promoter.

== Geography ==
According to the United States Census Bureau, the township has a total area of 35.9 square miles (93 km^{2}), of which 35.5 square miles (92 km^{2}) is land and 0.5 square miles (1.3 km^{2}) (1.31%) is water.

== Demographics ==
As of the census of 2000, there were 286 people, 109 households, and 79 families residing in the township. The population density was 8.1 inhabitants per square mile (3.1/km^{2}). There were 118 housing units at an average density of 3.3 per square mile (1.3/km^{2}). The racial makeup of the township was 99.65% White, and 0.35% from two or more races. Hispanic or Latino of any race were 1.05% of the population.

There were 109 households, out of which 29.4% had children under the age of 18 living with them, 63.3% were married couples living together, 6.4% had a female householder with no husband present, and 27.5% were non-families. 23.9% of all households were made up of individuals, and 15.6% had someone living alone who was 65 years of age or older. The average household size was 2.62 and the average family size was 3.15.

In the township the population was spread out, with 22.7% under the age of 18, 11.5% from 18 to 24, 27.6% from 25 to 44, 21.7% from 45 to 64, and 16.4% who were 65 years of age or older. The median age was 36 years. For every 100 females, there were 97.2 males. For every 100 females age 18 and over, there were 110.5 males.

The median income for a household in the township was $32,500, and the median income for a family was $38,472. Males had a median income of $26,528 versus $22,750 for females. The per capita income for the township was $13,944. None of the families and 3.3% of the population were living below the poverty line, including no under eighteens and 10.3% of those over 64.
