= Pillsbury Township, Swift County, Minnesota =

Pillsbury Township, Minnesota
- Township
- Location within the state of Minnesota Pillsbury Township, Minnesota (the United States)
- Coordinates: 45°11′38″N 95°18′36″W
- Country: United States
- State: Minnesota
- County: Swift

Area
  - Total: 34.9 sq mi (90.3 km^{2})
  - Land: 34.8 sq mi (90.2 km^{2})
  - Water: 0.039 sq mi (0.1 km^{2})
- Elevation: 1,089 ft (332 m)

Population (2000)
  - Total: 306
  - Density: 8.8/sq mi (3.4/km^{2})
- Time zone: UTC-6 (Central (CST))
  - Summer (DST): UTC-5 (CDT)
- FIPS code: 27-50920
- GNIS feature ID: 0665298

Pillsbury Township is a township in Swift County, Minnesota, United States. The population was 306 at the 2000 census.

Pillsbury Township was organized in 1876, and named for John S. Pillsbury, eighth governor of Minnesota.

== Geography ==
According to the United States Census Bureau, the township has a total area of 34.9 square miles (90.3 km^{2}); 34.8 square miles (90.2 km^{2}) is land and 0.04 square mile (0.1 km^{2}) (0.09%) is water.

== Demographics ==
At the 2000 census, there were 306 people, 101 households and 84 families residing in the township. The population density was 8.8 per square mile (3.4/km^{2}). There were 106 housing units at an average density of 3.0/sq mi (1.2/km^{2}). The racial makeup of the township was 96.08% White, 0.65% Native American, 3.27% from other races. Hispanic or Latino of any race were 3.27% of the population.

There were 101 households, of which 40.6% had children under the age of 18 living with them, 75.2% were married couples living together, 5.9% had a female householder with no husband present, and 16.8% were non-families. 16.8% of all households were made up of individuals, and 7.9% had someone living alone who was 65 years of age or older. The average household size was 3.03 and the average family size was 3.43.

34.0% of the population were under the age of 18, 6.5% from 18 to 24, 28.8% from 25 to 44, 19.6% from 45 to 64, and 11.1% who were 65 years of age or older. The median age was 34 years. For every 100 females, there were 115.5 males. For every 100 females age 18 and over, there were 108.2 males.

The median household income was $43,125 and the median family income was $44,375. Males had a median income of $26,932 compared with $25,833 for females. The per capita income for the township was $16,021. About 4.7% of families and 6.3% of the population were below the poverty line, including 9.8% of those under the age of eighteen and 12.8% of those 65 or over.
