= Kerkhoven, Minnesota =

City in Minnesota, United States

Kerkhoven
- City
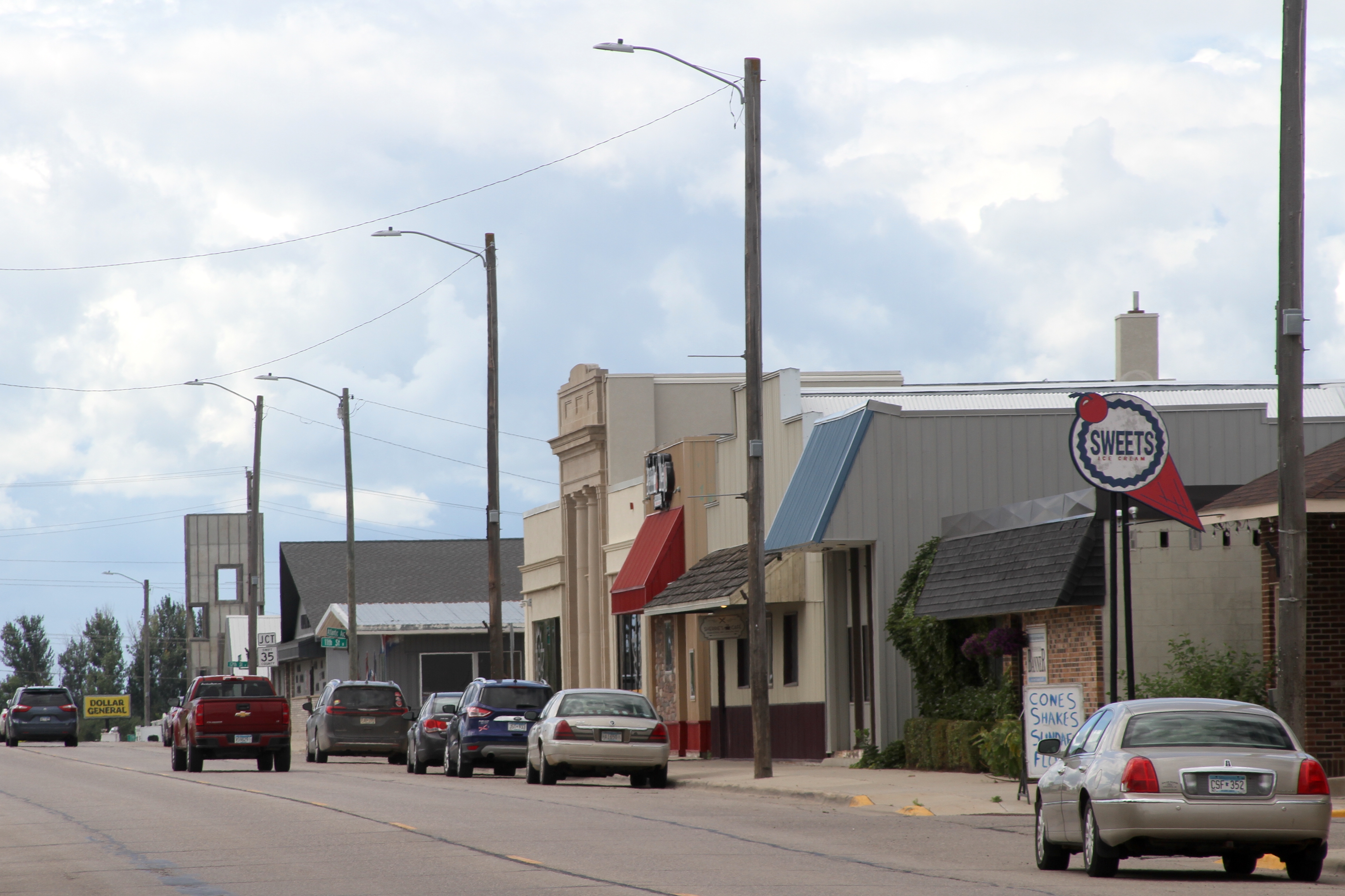
- Businesses on Atlantic Avenue
- Nickname: Kerk
- Motto: "A Small Town with Big Possibilities."
- Location of Kerkhoven, Minnesota
- Coordinates: 45°11′33″N 95°19′13″W
- Country: United States
- State: Minnesota
- County: Swift

Government
  - Mayor: Kordell Van Heuveln

Area
  - Total: 0.83 sq mi (2.16 km^{2})
  - Land: 0.83 sq mi (2.16 km^{2})
  - Water: 0 sq mi (0.00 km^{2})
- Elevation: 1,102 ft (336 m)

Population (2020)
  - Total: 805
  - Density: 966.3/sq mi (373.08/km^{2})
- Time zone: UTC-6 (Central (CST))
  - Summer (DST): UTC-5 (CDT)
- ZIP code: 56252
- Area code: 320
- FIPS code: 27-32876
- GNIS feature ID: 2395519
- Website: http://www.cityofkerk.com/

Kerkhoven (/ˈkɜːrkhoʊvən/ KURK-hoh-vən) is a city in Swift County, Minnesota, United States, located roughly 100 miles (160 km) west of the Twin Cities region of Minneapolis/St. Paul along U.S. Route 12. The population was 805 at the 2020 census.

== History ==
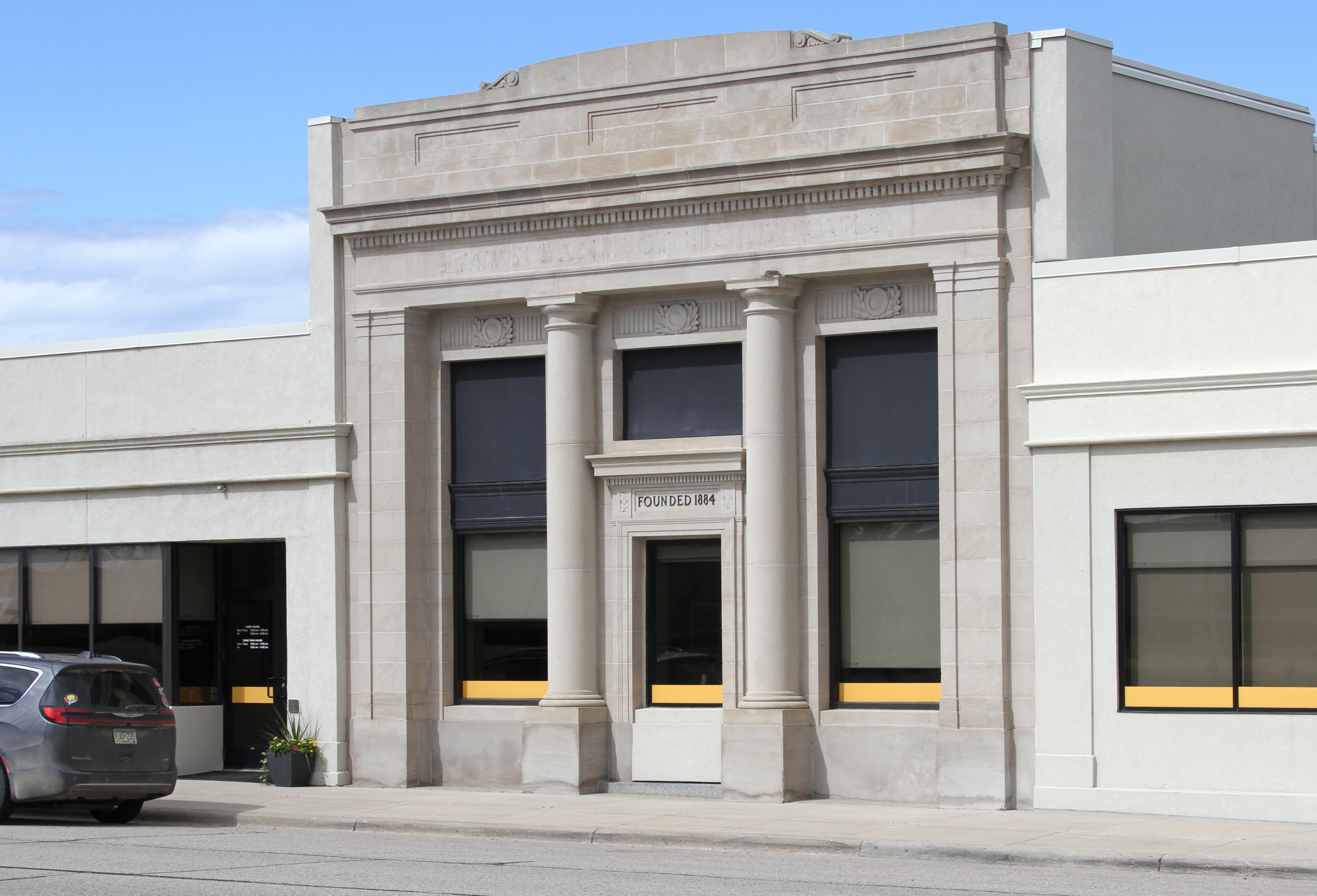
Former bank building

Kerkhoven was platted in 1870, and named for a railroad promoter. A post office has been in operation at Kerkhoven since 1871. Kerkhoven was incorporated in 1881.

The city name is Dutch meaning church cemeteries. It is from the persons who purchased bonds (Kerkhoven and Co. of Holland in 1864) of the St. Paul & Pacific Railroad (later the Great Northern etc.). The family name originally was van Kerckhoven (van=from, kerk=church and hoven=gardens or yards). They were financial persons purchasing interest-bearing bonds, but not active promoters of the fledgling prairie railroad.

== Geography ==
According to the United States Census Bureau, the city has a total area of 0.82 square miles (2.12 km^{2}), all land.

== Demographics ==
Historical population
| Census | Pop. | Note | %± |
|---|---|---|---|
| 1880 | 94 | | — |
| 1890 | 299 | | 218.1% |
| 1900 | 411 | | 37.5% |
| 1910 | 432 | | 5.1% |
| 1920 | 568 | | 31.5% |
| 1930 | 553 | | −2.6% |
| 1940 | 607 | | 9.8% |
| 1950 | 664 | | 9.4% |
| 1960 | 645 | | −2.9% |
| 1970 | 641 | | −0.6% |
| 1980 | 761 | | 18.7% |
| 1990 | 735 | | −3.4% |
| 2000 | 759 | | 3.3% |
| 2010 | 759 | | 0.0% |
| 2020 | 805 | | 6.1% |
U.S. Decennial Census

=== 2010 census ===
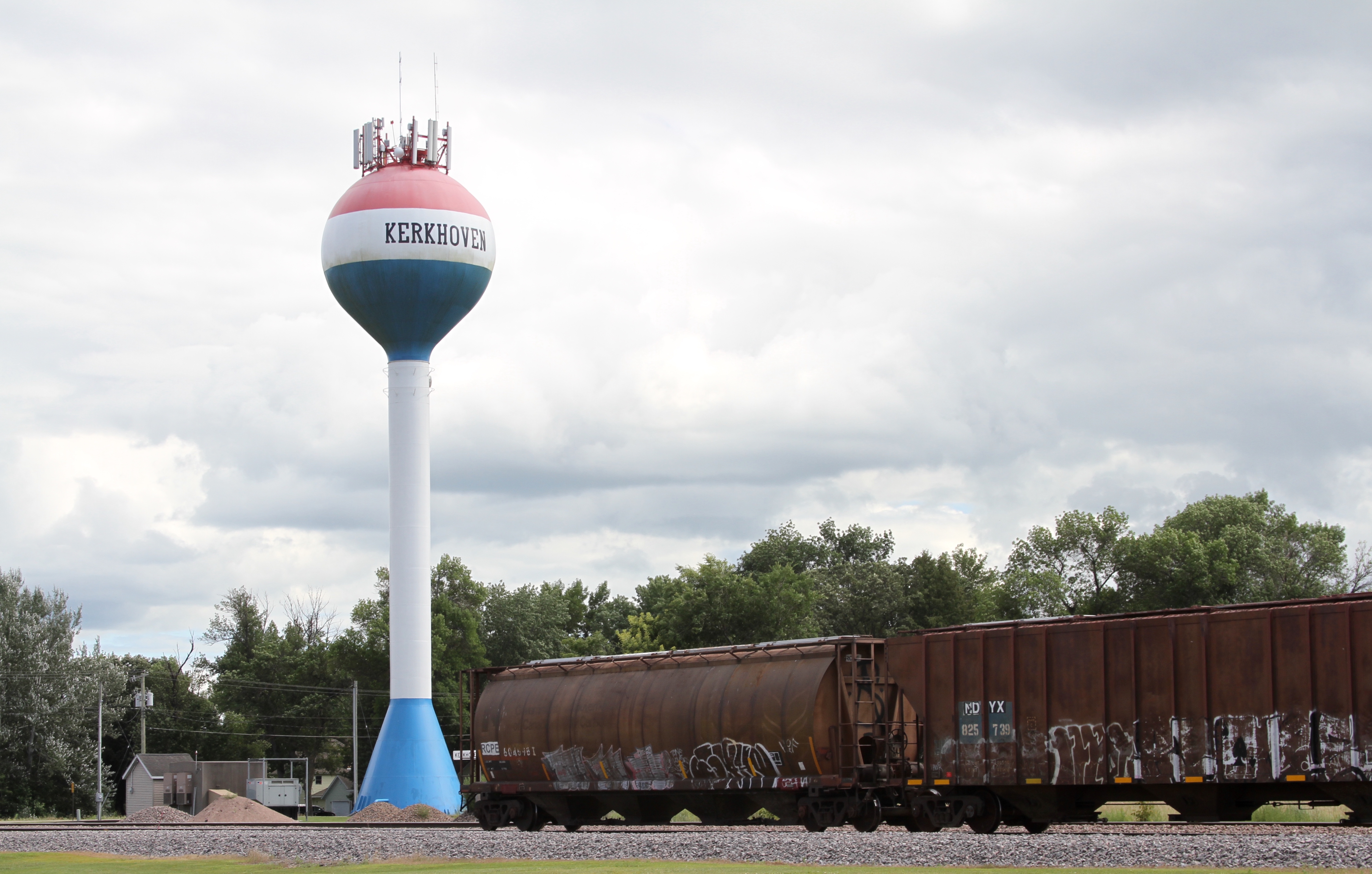
Water tower

As of the census of 2010, there were 759 people, 329 households, and 206 families residing in the city. The population density was 925.6 inhabitants per square mile (357.4/km^{2}). There were 352 housing units at an average density of 429.3 per square mile (165.8/km^{2}). The racial makeup of the city was 97.1% White, 0.3% Native American, 2.5% from other races, and 0.1% from two or more races. Hispanic or Latino of any race were 12.3% of the population.

There were 329 households, of which 31.0% had children under the age of 18 living with them, 49.5% were married couples living together, 9.7% had a female householder with no husband present, 3.3% had a male householder with no wife present, and 37.4% were non-families. 34.7% of all households were made up of individuals, and 16.2% had someone living alone who was 65 years of age or older. The average household size was 2.31 and the average family size was 2.97.

The median age in the city was 40.1 years. 26% of residents were under the age of 18; 8.6% were between the ages of 18 and 24; 21.1% were from 25 to 44; 26.4% were from 45 to 64; and 17.8% were 65 years of age or older. The gender makeup of the city was 49.7% male and 50.3% female.

=== 2000 census ===
As of the census of 2000, there were 759 people, 313 households, and 210 families residing in the city. The population density was 1,023.5 inhabitants per square mile (395.2/km^{2}). There were 338 housing units at an average density of 455.8 per square mile (176.0/km^{2}). The racial makeup of the city was 94.99% White, 0.13% African American, 0.40% Native American, 4.22% from other races, and 0.26% from two or more races. Hispanic or Latino of any race were 4.74% of the population.

There were 313 households, out of which 31.0% had children under the age of 18 living with them, 56.5% were married couples living together, 8.0% had a female householder with no husband present, and 32.6% were non-families. 30.0% of all households were made up of individuals, and 16.9% had someone living alone who was 65 years of age or older. The average household size was 2.42 and the average family size was 3.00.

In the city, the population was spread out, with 27.3% under the age of 18, 7.0% from 18 to 24, 26.9% from 25 to 44, 18.2% from 45 to 64, and 20.7% who were 65 years of age or older. The median age was 38 years. For every 100 females there were 88.8 males. For every 100 females age 18 and over, there were 85.9 males.

The median income for a household in the city was $32,375, and the median income for a family was $40,179. Males had a median income of $27,262 versus $22,656 for females. The per capita income for the city was $16,435. About 8.4% of families and 9.3% of the population were below the poverty line, including 15.0% of those under age 18 and 7.8% of those age 65 or over.

== Education ==
Kerkhoven is home to Kerkhoven-Murdock-Sunburg Junior Senior High School on the western side of the community. The current building (which replaced the 1904 McKinley Building complex) was constructed in 1994 during 1993-1994, adjacent to the old one. The original structure was demolished in the summer of 1994. The new and current building started during the 1994-1995 school year. The local high school (Kerkhoven-Murdock-Sunburg Fighting Saints) claimed the 2008 Minnesota High School Football Class A Championship by defeating Royalton, and reigned as 2009 Minnesota Class A Wrestling Champions.
