= West Bank Township, Swift County, Minnesota =

West Bank Township, Minnesota
- Township
- Location within the state of Minnesota West Bank Township, Minnesota (the United States)
- Coordinates: 45°11′17″N 95°47′13″W
- Country: United States
- State: Minnesota
- County: Swift

Area
  - Total: 36.2 sq mi (93.7 km^{2})
  - Land: 36.2 sq mi (93.7 km^{2})
  - Water: 0 sq mi (0.0 km^{2})
- Elevation: 1,027 ft (313 m)

Population (2000)
  - Total: 200
  - Density: 5.4/sq mi (2.1/km^{2})
- Time zone: UTC-6 (Central (CST))
  - Summer (DST): UTC-5 (CDT)
- FIPS code: 27-69214
- GNIS feature ID: 0665955

West Bank Township is a township in Swift County, Minnesota, United States. The population was 200 at the 2000 census.

West Bank Township was organized in 1879, and named for its location west of the Chippewa River.

== Geography ==
According to the United States Census Bureau, the township has a total area of 36.2 square miles (93.7 km^{2}), all land.

== Demographics ==
As of the census of 2000, there were 200 people, 74 households, and 54 families residing in the township. The population density was 5.5 people per square mile (2.1/km^{2}). There were 85 housing units at an average density of 2.4/sq mi (0.9/km^{2}). The racial makeup of the township was 97.00% White, 3.00% from other races. Hispanic or Latino of any race were 2.00% of the population.

There were 74 households, out of which 40.5% had children under the age of 18 living with them, 68.9% were married couples living together, 2.7% had a female householder with no husband present, and 25.7% were non-families. 23.0% of all households were made up of individuals, and 5.4% had someone living alone who was 65 years of age or older. The average household size was 2.70 and the average family size was 3.20.

In the township the population was spread out, with 33.5% under the age of 18, 3.0% from 18 to 24, 28.5% from 25 to 44, 19.5% from 45 to 64, and 15.5% who were 65 years of age or older. The median age was 37 years. For every 100 females, there were 129.9 males. For every 100 females age 18 and over, there were 107.8 males.

The median income for a household in the township was $34,063, and the median income for a family was $38,750. Males had a median income of $21,563 versus $20,625 for females. The per capita income for the township was $14,140. About 2.9% of families and 4.6% of the population were below the poverty line, including 3.4% of those under the age of eighteen and none of those 65 or over.
