= Danvers, Minnesota =

City in Minnesota, United States

- City
- Location of Danvers, Minnesota
- Coordinates: 45°16′53″N 95°45′21″W
- Country: United States
- State: Minnesota
- County: Swift
- Incorporated: January 19, 1900

Government
  - Mayor: Julie A. Commerford

Area
  - Total: 0.695 sq mi (1.799 km^{2})
  - Land: 0.695 sq mi (1.799 km^{2})
  - Water: 0 sq mi (0.000 km^{2})
- Elevation: 1,033 ft (315 m)

Population (2020)
  - Total: 103
  - Estimate (2022): 101
  - Density: 148.2/sq mi (57.23/km^{2})
- Time zone: UTC−6 (Central (CST))
  - Summer (DST): UTC−5 (CDT)
- ZIP Code: 56231
- Area code: 320
- FIPS code: 27-14734
- GNIS feature ID: 2393714
- Sales tax: 6.875%

Danvers is a city in Swift County, Minnesota, United States. The population was 103 at the 2020 census. The community is named after Danvers, Massachusetts.

== History ==
A post office called Danvers has been in operation since 1892. Danvers had a depot on the railroad.

== Geography ==
According to the United States Census Bureau, the city has a total area of 1.799 square miles (4.66 km^{2}), all land.

U.S. Route 12 serves as a main route in the community.

== Demographics ==
Historical population
Census	Pop.	Note	%±
1900	112		—
1910	215		92.0%
1920	253		17.7%
1930	177		−30.0%
1940	184		4.0%
1950	162		−12.0%
1960	132		−18.5%
1970	136		3.0%
1980	152		11.8%
1990	98		−35.5%
2000	108		10.2%
2010	97		−10.2%
2020	103		6.2%
2022 (est.)	101		−1.9%
U.S. Decennial Census; 2020 Census

=== 2010 census ===
As of the 2010 census, there were 97 people, 40 households, and 28 families living in the city. The population density was 131.1 inhabitants per square mile (50.6/km^{2}). There were 45 housing units at an average density of 60.8 per square mile (23.5/km^{2}). The racial makeup of the city was 97.9% White, 1.0% from other races, and 1.0% from two or more races. Hispanic or Latino of any race were 1.0% of the population.

There were 40 households, of which 35.0% had children under the age of 18 living with them, 57.5% were married couples living together, 2.5% had a female householder with no husband present, 10.0% had a male householder with no wife present, and 30.0% were non-families. 25.0% of all households were made up of individuals, and 15% had someone living alone who was 65 years of age or older. The average household size was 2.43 and the average family size was 2.86.

The median age in the city was 41.5 years. 25.8% of residents were under the age of 18; 6.1% were between the ages of 18 and 24; 24.8% were from 25 to 44; 28.8% were from 45 to 64; and 14.4% were 65 years of age or older. The gender makeup of the city was 52.6% male and 47.4% female.

=== 2000 census ===
As of the 2000 census, there were 108 people, 43 households, and 31 families living in the city. The population density was 153.4 inhabitants per square mile (59.2/km^{2}). There were 47 housing units at an average density of 66.8 per square mile (25.8/km^{2}). The racial makeup of the city was 100.00% White.

There were 43 households, out of which 37.2% had children under the age of 18 living with them, 65.1% were married couples living together, 2.3% had a female householder with no husband present, and 27.9% were non-families. 23.3% of all households were made up of individuals, and 16.3% had someone living alone who was 65 years of age or older. The average household size was 2.51 and the average family size was 3.00.

In the city, the population was spread out, with 28.7% under the age of 18, 6.5% from 18 to 24, 24.1% from 25 to 44, 25.0% from 45 to 64, and 15.7% who were 65 years of age or older. The median age was 39 years. For every 100 females, there were 100.0 males. For every 100 females age 18 and over, there were 87.8 males.

The median income for a household in the city was $44,000, and the median income for a family was $45,938. Males had a median income of $38,000 versus $20,313 for females. The per capita income for the city was $23,452. There were no families and 4.7% of the population living below the poverty line, including no under eighteens and 23.5% of those over 64.
