= Clontarf Township, Swift County, Minnesota =

Clontarf Township, Minnesota
- Township
- Location within the state of Minnesota Clontarf Township, Minnesota (the United States)
- Coordinates: 45°22′30″N 95°42′3″W
- Country: United States
- State: Minnesota
- County: Swift

Area
  - Total: 33.9 sq mi (87.9 km^{2})
  - Land: 33.8 sq mi (87.5 km^{2})
  - Water: 0.12 sq mi (0.3 km^{2})
- Elevation: 1,030 ft (314 m)

Population (2000)
  - Total: 80
  - Density: 2.3/sq mi (0.9/km^{2})
- Time zone: UTC-6 (Central (CST))
  - Summer (DST): UTC-5 (CDT)
- ZIP code: 56226
- Area code: 320
- FIPS code: 27-12142
- GNIS feature ID: 0663832

Clontarf Township is a township in Swift County, Minnesota, United States. The population was 80 at the 2000 census.

Clontarf Township was organized in 1876, and named after Clontarf in Ireland.

== Geography ==
According to the United States Census Bureau, the township has a total area of 33.9 square miles (88 km^{2}), of which 33.8 square miles (88 km^{2}) is land and 0.1 square miles (0.26 km^{2}) (0.38%) is water.

== Demographics ==
As of the census of 2000, there were 80 people, 32 households, and 22 families residing in the township. The population density was 2.4 inhabitants per square mile (0.93/km^{2}). There were 35 housing units at an average density of 1.0 per square mile (0.39/km^{2}). The racial makeup of the township was 98.75% White, and 1.25% from two or more races. Hispanic or Latino of any race were 5.00% of the population.

There were 32 households, out of which 31.3% had children under the age of 18 living with them, 59.4% were married couples living together, and 31.3% were non-families. 31.3% of all households were made up of individuals, and 18.8% had someone living alone who was 65 years of age or older. The average household size was 2.50 and the average family size was 3.14.

In the township the population was spread out, with 27.5% under the age of 18, 8.8% from 18 to 24, 30.0% from 25 to 44, 20.0% from 45 to 64, and 13.8% who were 65 years of age or older. The median age was 36 years. For every 100 females, there were 116.2 males. For every 100 females age 18 and over, there were 123.1 males.

The median income for a household in the township was $38,333, and the median income for a family was $40,625. Males had a median income of $26,250 versus $16,250 for females. The per capita income for the township was $15,617. There were 15.8% of families and 11.3% of the population living below the poverty line, including no under eighteens and none of those over 64.
