= Marysland Township, Swift County, Minnesota =

Marysland Township, Minnesota
- Township
- Location within the state of Minnesota Marysland Township, Minnesota (the United States)
- Coordinates: 45°16′18″N 95°48′53″W
- Country: United States
- State: Minnesota
- County: Swift

Area
  - Total: 35.3 sq mi (91.4 km^{2})
  - Land: 35.3 sq mi (91.4 km^{2})
  - Water: 0 sq mi (0.0 km^{2})
- Elevation: 1,020 ft (311 m)

Population (2000)
  - Total: 102
  - Density: 2.8/sq mi (1.1/km^{2})
- Time zone: UTC-6 (Central (CST))
  - Summer (DST): UTC-5 (CDT)
- FIPS code: 27-40904
- GNIS feature ID: 0664926

Marysland Township is a township in Swift County, Minnesota, United States. The population was 102 at the 2000 census.

Originally settled by a colony of Irish Catholics, Marysland Township was organized in 1879.

== Geography ==
According to the United States Census Bureau, the township has a total area of 35.3 square miles (91.4 km^{2}), all land.

== Demographics ==
As of the census of 2000, there were 102 people, 43 households, and 27 families residing in the township. The population density was 2.9 inhabitants per square mile (1.1/km^{2}). There were 48 housing units at an average density of 1.4 per square mile (0.54/km^{2}). The racial makeup of the township was 100.00% White.

There were 43 households, out of which 30.2% had children under the age of 18 living with them, 62.8% were married couples living together, 2.3% had a female householder with no husband present, and 34.9% were non-families. 32.6% of all households were made up of individuals, and 11.6% had someone living alone who was 65 years of age or older. The average household size was 2.37 and the average family size was 3.07.

In the township the population was spread out, with 27.5% under the age of 18, 5.9% from 18 to 24, 27.5% from 25 to 44, 27.5% from 45 to 64, and 11.8% who were 65 years of age or older. The median age was 42 years. For every 100 females, there were 92.5 males. For every 100 females age 18 and over, there were 94.7 males.

The median income for a household in the township was $46,250, and the median income for a family was $48,750. Males had a median income of $38,500 versus $20,625 for females. The per capita income for the township was $20,127. There were 8.7% of families and 13.3% of the population living below the poverty line, including 14.8% of under eighteens and 15.4% of those over 64.
