= Holloway, Minnesota =

City in Minnesota, United States

- City
- Location of Holloway, Minnesota
- Coordinates: 45°14′39″N 95°54′40″W
- Country: United States
- State: Minnesota
- County: Swift
- Incorporated: February 14, 1903

Government
  - Mayor: Bradley Oyen

Area
  - Total: 1.401 sq mi (3.629 km^{2})
  - Land: 1.400 sq mi (3.627 km^{2})
  - Water: 0.0015 sq mi (0.004 km^{2})
- Elevation: 1,020 ft (310 m)

Population (2020)
  - Total: 87
  - Estimate (2022): 86
  - Density: 62.1/sq mi (23.99/km^{2})
- Time zone: UTC−6 (Central (CST))
  - Summer (DST): UTC−5 (CDT)
- ZIP Code: 56249
- Area code: 320
- FIPS code: 27-29672
- GNIS feature ID: 2394405
- Sales tax: 6.875%

Holloway is a city in Swift County, Minnesota, United States. The population was 87 at the 2020 census.

== History ==
A post office called Holloway has been in operation since 1889. The city was named for an early settler.

== Geography ==
According to the United States Census Bureau, the city has a total area of 1.401 square miles (3.63 km^{2}), of which 1.400 square miles (3.63 km^{2}) is land and 0.001 square miles (0.00 km^{2}) is water.

U.S. Route 59 serves as a main route in the community.

== Demographics ==
Historical population
Census	Pop.	Note	%±
1910	215		—
1920	289		34.4%
1930	269		−6.9%
1940	286		6.3%
1950	264		−7.7%
1960	242		−8.3%
1970	146		−39.7%
1980	142		−2.7%
1990	123		−13.4%
2000	112		−8.9%
2010	92		−17.9%
2020	87		−5.4%
2022 (est.)	86		−1.1%
U.S. Decennial Census; 2020 Census

=== 2010 census ===
As of the 2010 census, there were 92 people, 50 households, and 29 families living in the city. The population density was 66.2 inhabitants per square mile (25.6/km^{2}). There were 58 housing units at an average density of 41.7 per square mile (16.1/km^{2}). The racial makeup of the city was 100.0% White.

There were 50 households, of which 12.0% had children under the age of 18 living with them, 48.0% were married couples living together, 10.0% had a female householder with no husband present, and 42.0% were non-families. 40.0% of all households were made up of individuals, and 16% had someone living alone who was 65 years of age or older. The average household size was 1.84 and the average family size was 2.38.

The median age in the city was 53 years. 13% of residents were under the age of 18; 4.5% were between the ages of 18 and 24; 19.5% were from 25 to 44; 40.3% were from 45 to 64; and 22.8% were 65 years of age or older. The gender makeup of the city was 51.1% male and 48.9% female.

=== 2000 census ===
As of the 2000 census, there were 112 people, 54 households, and 30 families living in the city. The population density was 81.1 inhabitants per square mile (31.3/km^{2}). There were 59 housing units at an average density of 42.7 per square mile (16.5/km^{2}). The racial makeup of the city was 99.11% White, and 0.89% from two or more races. Hispanic or Latino of any race were 7.14% of the population.

There were 54 households, out of which 27.8% had children under the age of 18 living with them, 40.7% were married couples living together, 11.1% had a female householder with no husband present, and 44.4% were non-families. 40.7% of all households were made up of individuals, and 20.4% had someone living alone who was 65 years of age or older. The average household size was 2.07 and the average family size was 2.83.

In the city, the population was spread out, with 25.0% under the age of 18, 7.1% from 18 to 24, 24.1% from 25 to 44, 19.6% from 45 to 64, and 24.1% who were 65 years of age or older. The median age was 41 years. For every 100 females, there were 96.5 males. For every 100 females age 18 and over, there were 90.9 males.

The median income for a household in the city was $31,250, and the median income for a family was $37,500. Males had a median income of $26,042 versus $21,250 for females. The per capita income for the city was $14,882. There were 6.3% of families and 9.2% of the population living below the poverty line, including no under eighteens and 10.7% of those over 64.
