= Camp Lake Township, Swift County, Minnesota =

Camp Lake Township, Minnesota
- Township
- Location within the state of Minnesota Camp Lake Township, Minnesota (the United States)
- Coordinates: 45°22′53″N 95°25′31″W
- Country: United States
- State: Minnesota
- County: Swift

Area
  - Total: 35.8 sq mi (92.8 km^{2})
  - Land: 35.4 sq mi (91.7 km^{2})
  - Water: 0.42 sq mi (1.1 km^{2})
- Elevation: 1,079 ft (329 m)

Population (2000)
  - Total: 222
  - Density: 6.2/sq mi (2.4/km^{2})
- Time zone: UTC-6 (Central (CST))
  - Summer (DST): UTC-5 (CDT)
- FIPS code: 27-09532
- GNIS feature ID: 0663736

Camp Lake Township is a township in Swift County, Minnesota, United States. The population was 222 at the 2000 census.

Settled in the 1860s, Camp Lake Township was named after Camp Lake.

== Geography ==
According to the United States Census Bureau, the township has a total area of 35.8 square miles (93 km^{2}), of which 35.4 square miles (92 km^{2}) is land and 0.4 square miles (1.0 km^{2}) (1.14%) is water.

== Demographics ==
As of the 2000 census, there were 222 people, 94 households, and 65 families residing in the township. The population density was 6.3 inhabitants per square mile (2.4/km^{2}). There were 113 housing units at an average density of 3.2 per square mile (1.2/km^{2}). The racial makeup of the township was 98.65% White, 0.45% African American, 0.45% from other races, and 0.45% from two or more races. Hispanic or Latino of any race were 0.90% of the population.

There were 94 households, out of which 25.5% had children under the age of 18 living with them, 66.0% were married couples living together, 2.1% had a female householder with no husband present, and 29.8% were non-families. 25.5% of all households were made up of individuals, and 12.8% had someone living alone who was 65 years of age or older. The average household size was 2.36 and the average family size was 2.79.

In the township the population was spread out, with 22.5% under the age of 18, 6.8% from 18 to 24, 22.1% from 25 to 44, 25.2% from 45 to 64, and 23.4% who were 65 years of age or older. The median age was 44 years. For every 100 females, there were 109.4 males. For every 100 females age 18 and over, there were 107.2 males.

The median income for a household in the township was $31,875, and the median income for a family was $36,875. Males had a median income of $26,591 versus $23,125 for females. The per capita income for the township was $17,084. About 5.3% of families and 6.0% of the population were below the poverty line, including 2.4% of those under the age of eighteen and 23.4% of those 65 or over.
