= Tara Township, Swift County, Minnesota =

Tara Township, Minnesota
- Township
- Location within the state of Minnesota Tara Township, Minnesota (the United States)
- Coordinates: 45°21′44″N 95°49′10″W
- Country: United States
- State: Minnesota
- County: Swift

Area
  - Total: 35.9 sq mi (92.9 km^{2})
  - Land: 35.8 sq mi (92.8 km^{2})
  - Water: 0.039 sq mi (0.1 km^{2})
- Elevation: 1,109 ft (338 m)

Population (2000)
  - Total: 121
  - Density: 3.4/sq mi (1.3/km^{2})
- Time zone: UTC-6 (Central (CST))
  - Summer (DST): UTC-5 (CDT)
- FIPS code: 27-64228
- GNIS feature ID: 0665764

Tara Township is a township in Swift County, Minnesota, United States. The population was 121 at the 2000 census.

Tara Township was organized in 1878, and named after the Hill of Tara in Ireland.

== Geography ==
According to the United States Census Bureau, the township has a total area of 35.9 square miles (92.9 km^{2}), of which 35.8 square miles (92.8 km^{2}) is land and 0.1 square mile (0.1 km^{2}) (0.14%) is water.

== Demographics ==
As of the census of 2000, there were 121 people, 42 households, and 34 families residing in the township. The population density was 3.4 people per square mile (1.3/km^{2}). There were 48 housing units at an average density of 1.3/sq mi (0.5/km^{2}). The racial makeup of the township was 100.00% White.

There were 42 households, out of which 35.7% had children under the age of 18 living with them, 76.2% were married couples living together, 4.8% had a female householder with no husband present, and 16.7% were non-families. 11.9% of all households were made up of individuals, and none had someone living alone who was 65 years of age or older. The average household size was 2.88 and the average family size was 3.14.

In the township the population was spread out, with 24.0% under the age of 18, 9.9% from 18 to 24, 26.4% from 25 to 44, 25.6% from 45 to 64, and 14.0% who were 65 years of age or older. The median age was 40 years. For every 100 females, there were 120.0 males. For every 100 females age 18 and over, there were 124.4 males.

The median income for a household in the township was $54,167, and the median income for a family was $55,227. Males had a median income of $28,750 versus $18,750 for females. The per capita income for the township was $15,656. None of the population and none of the families were below the poverty line.
