= Torning Township, Swift County, Minnesota =

Township, Minnesota
- Township
- Location within the state of Minnesota Township, Minnesota (the United States)
- Coordinates: 45°17′19″N 95°33′7″W
- Country: United States
- State: Minnesota
- County: Swift

Area
  - Total: 34.0 sq mi (88.1 km^{2})
  - Land: 34.0 sq mi (88.1 km^{2})
  - Water: 0 sq mi (0.0 km^{2})
- Elevation: 1,053 ft (321 m)

Population (2000)
  - Total: 505
  - Density: 15/sq mi (5.7/km^{2})
- Time zone: UTC-6 (Central (CST))
  - Summer (DST): UTC-5 (CDT)
- FIPS code: 27-65236
- GNIS feature ID: 0665799

Torning Township is a township in Swift County, Minnesota, United States. The population was 505 at the 2000 census.

Torning Township was organized in 1879, and probably named after a place in Denmark.

== Geography ==
According to the United States Census Bureau, the township has a total area of 34.0 square miles (88.1 km^{2}), all land.

== Demographics ==
As of the census of 2000, there were 505 people, 169 households, and 139 families residing in the township. The population density was 14.8 people per square mile (5.7/km^{2}). There were 177 housing units at an average density of 5.2/sq mi (2.0/km^{2}). The racial makeup of the township was 99.01% White, 0.20% African American, and 0.79% from two or more races. Hispanic or Latino of any race were 1.39% of the population.

There were 169 households, out of which 46.2% had children under the age of 18 living with them, 76.3% were married couples living together, 2.4% had a female householder with no husband present, and 17.2% were non-families. 13.6% of all households were made up of individuals, and 5.9% had someone living alone who was 65 years of age or older. The average household size was 2.99 and the average family size was 3.29.

In the township the population was spread out, with 31.3% under the age of 18, 7.7% from 18 to 24, 29.5% from 25 to 44, 21.2% from 45 to 64, and 10.3% who were 65 years of age or older. The median age was 36 years. For every 100 females, there were 109.5 males. For every 100 females age 18 and over, there were 112.9 males.

The median income for a household in the township was $47,344, and the median income for a family was $49,643. Males had a median income of $29,886 versus $20,000 for females. The per capita income for the township was $15,961. About 5.7% of families and 7.5% of the population were below the poverty line, including 7.2% of those under age 18 and 4.3% of those age 65 or over.
