= Swift County Courthouse =

- U.S. National Register of Historic Places
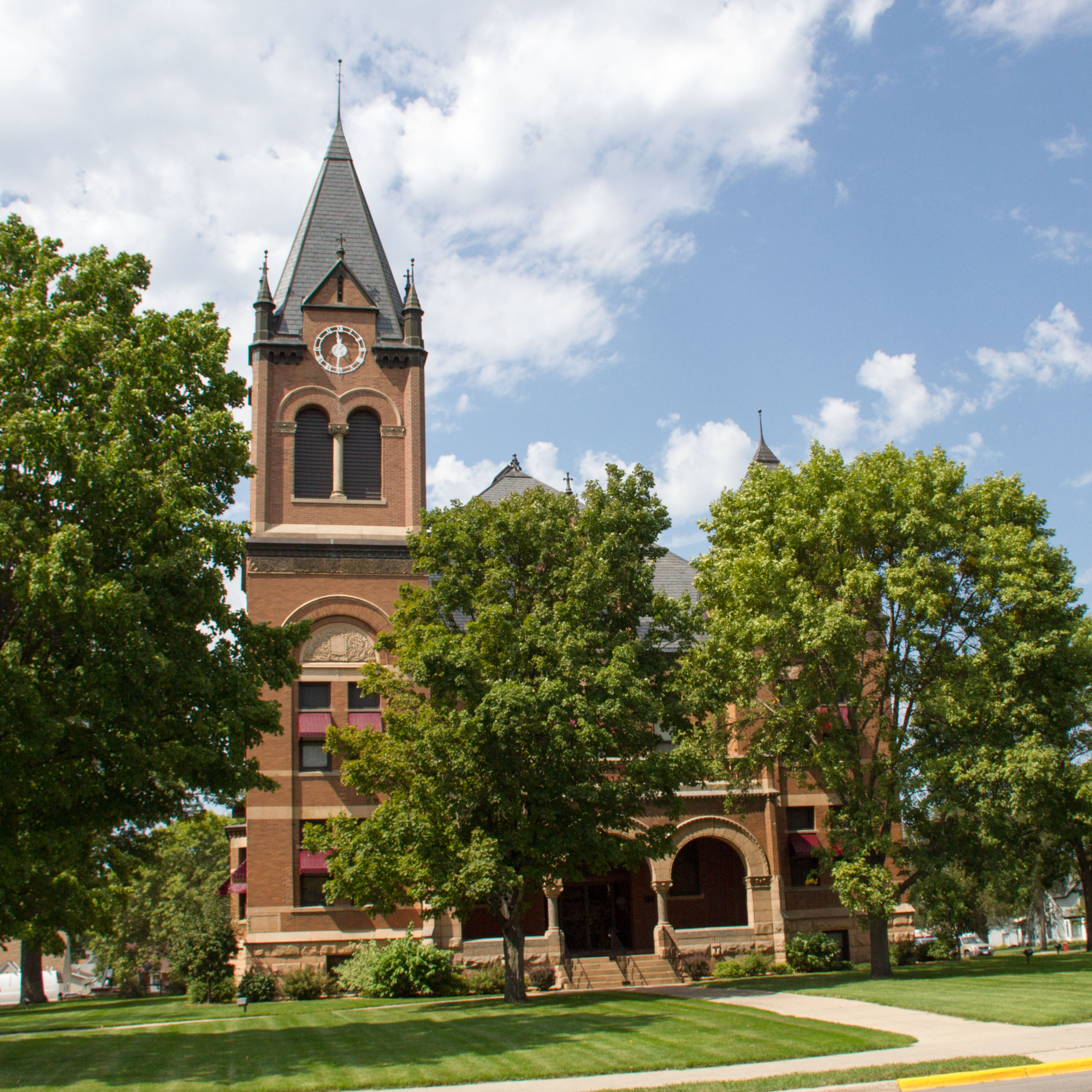
- The Swift County Courthouse from the southeast

- Location within Minnesota Location within the United States
- Location: 301 14th Street North, Benson, Minnesota
- Coordinates: 45°19′1.5″N 95°36′4″W
- Area: Less than one acre
- Built: 1897–98
- Built by: Deeks & Co.
- Architect: Buechner & Jacobson
- Architectural style: Richardsonian Romanesque
- NRHP reference No.: 77000771
- Designated: September 19, 1977

The Swift County Courthouse is the seat of government for Swift County, Minnesota, United States, located in the city of Benson. It has been in continual use since its dedication in 1898. The building was designed in Richardsonian Romanesque style by the architectural firm of Buechner & Jacobson. The courthouse was listed on the National Register of Historic Places in 1977 for having local significance in the themes of architecture and politics/government. It was nominated for its longstanding service as the center of Swift County government and for exemplifying the influence of Richardsonian Romanesque style on late-19th-century public buildings.

== Gallery ==
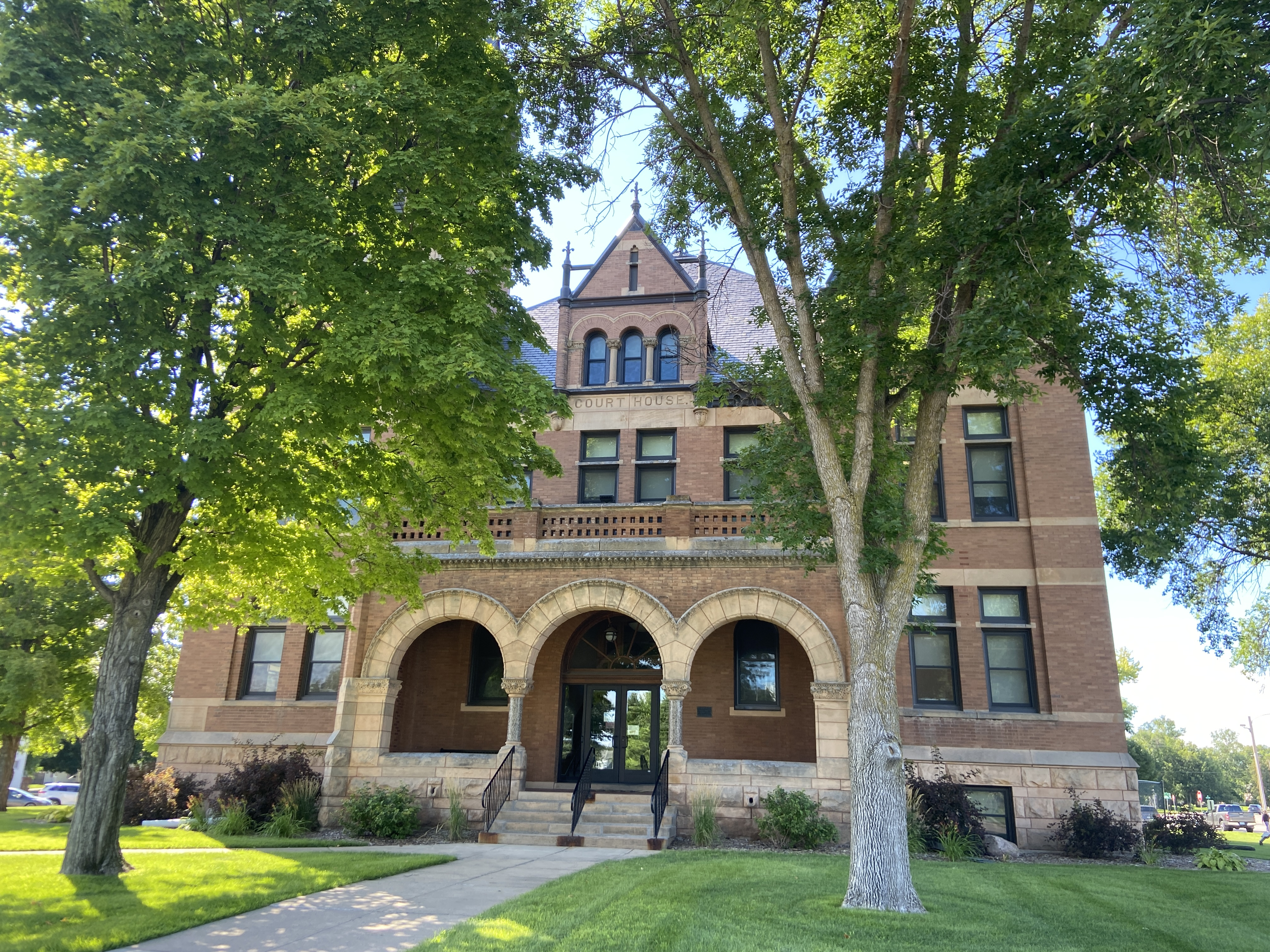

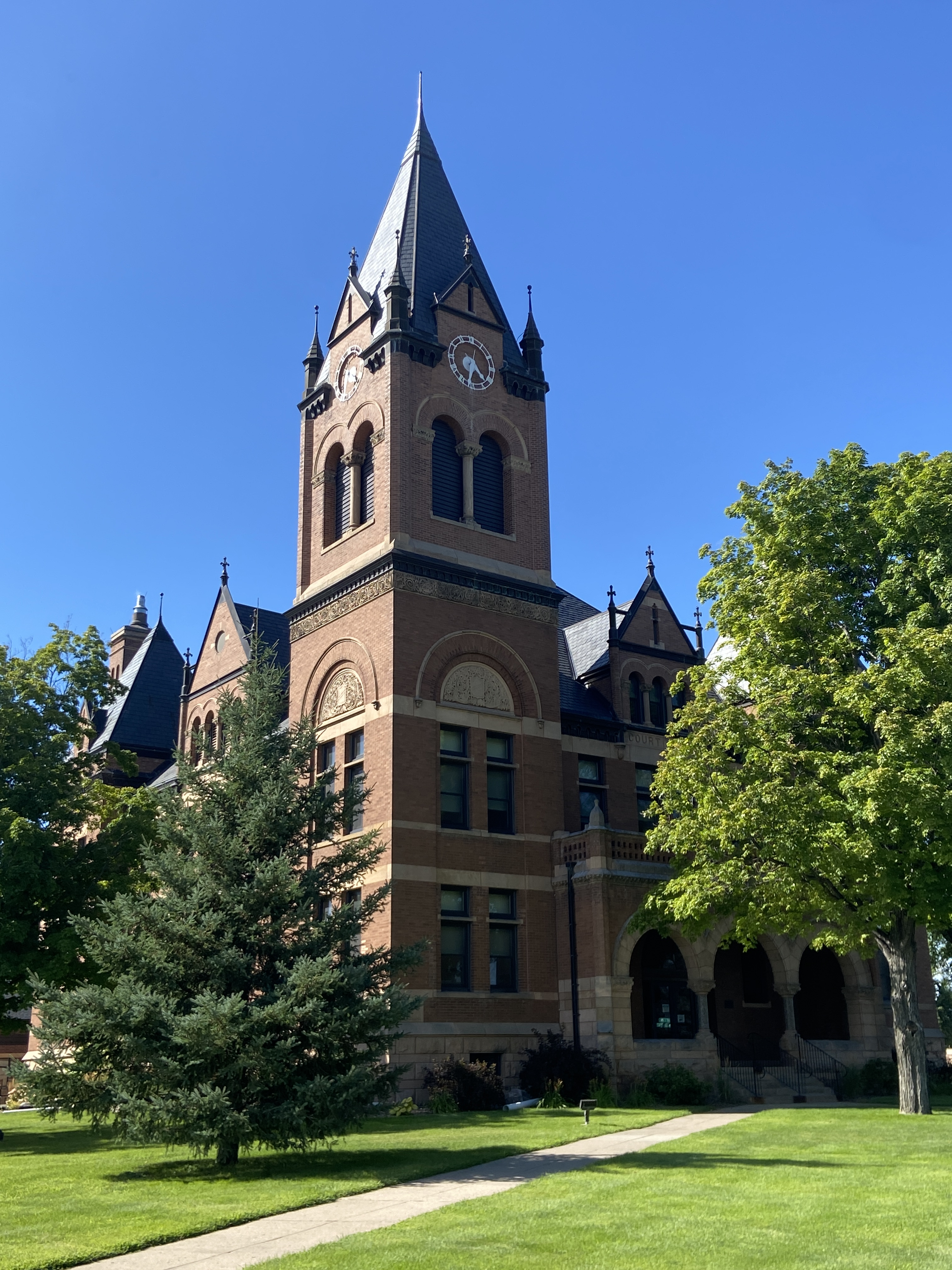

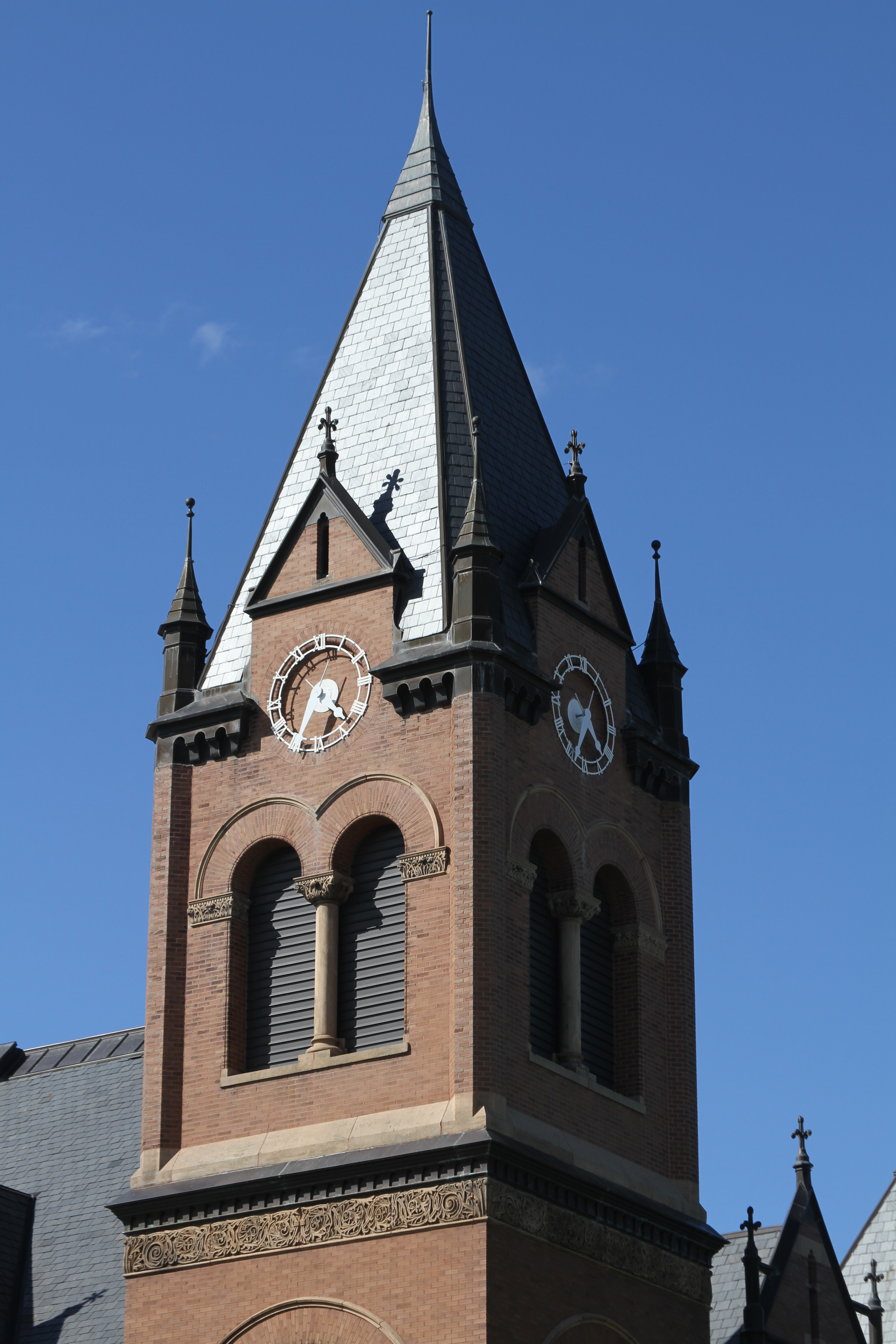

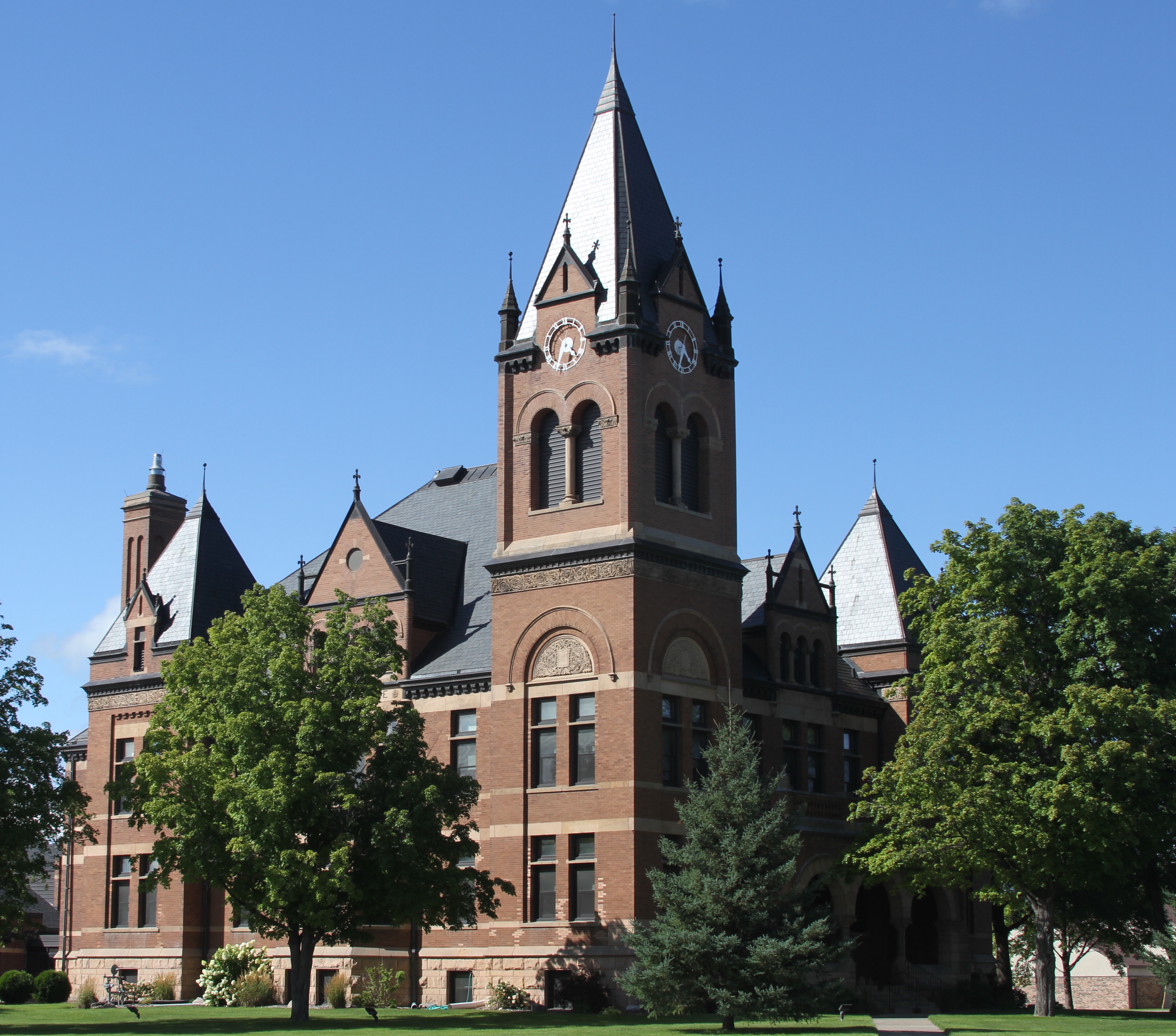

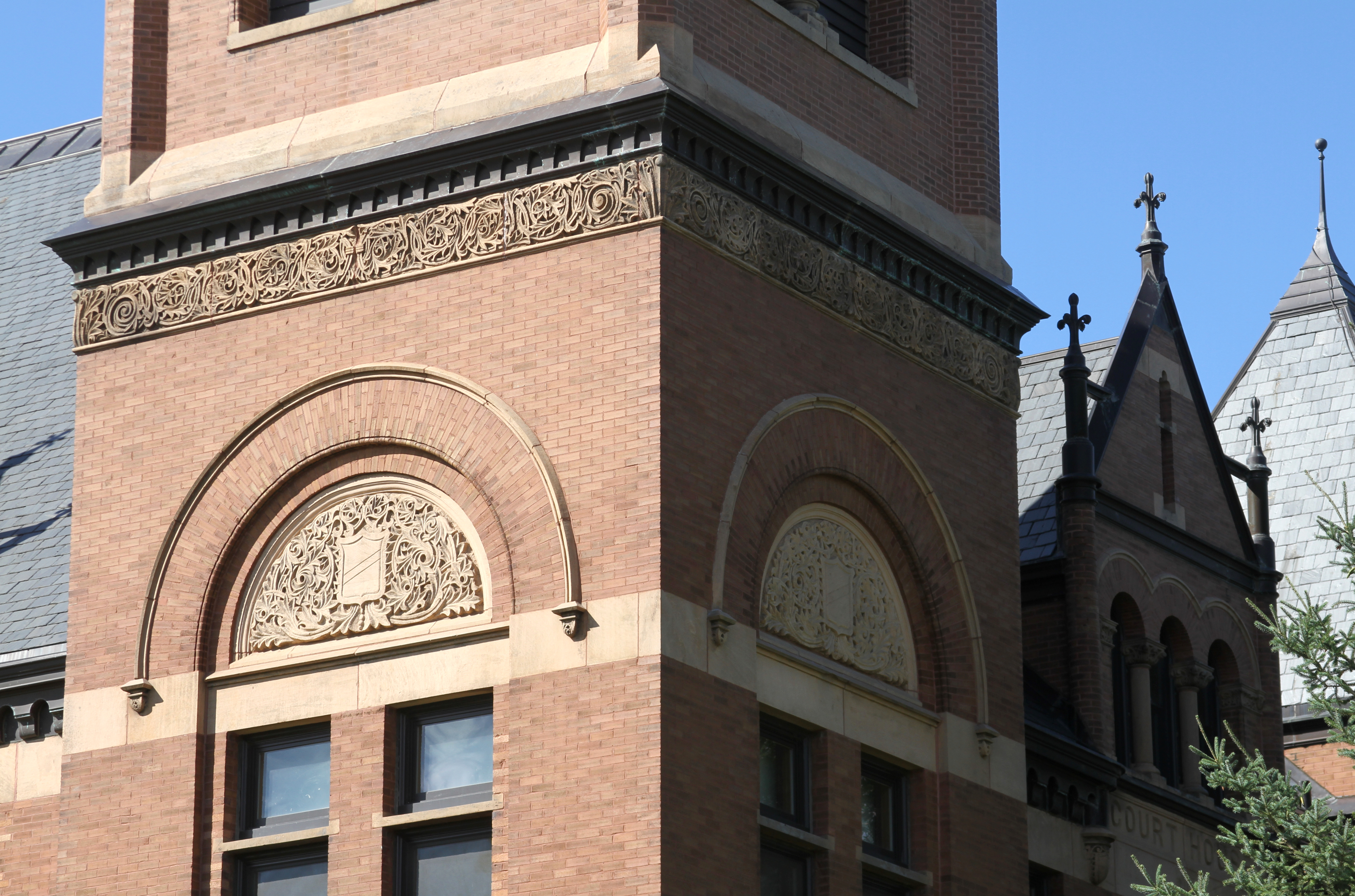

== See also ==
- List of county courthouses in Minnesota
- National Register of Historic Places listings in Swift County, Minnesota
