= Six Mile Grove Township, Swift County, Minnesota =

Six Mile Grove Township, Minnesota
- Township
- Location within the state of Minnesota Six Mile Grove Township, Minnesota (the United States)
- Coordinates: 45°17′0″N 95°40′36″W
- Country: United States
- State: Minnesota
- County: Swift

Area
  - Total: 35.9 sq mi (93.1 km^{2})
  - Land: 35.9 sq mi (93.0 km^{2})
  - Water: 0.039 sq mi (0.1 km^{2})
- Elevation: 1,030 ft (314 m)

Population (2000)
  - Total: 171
  - Density: 4.7/sq mi (1.8/km^{2})
- Time zone: UTC-6 (Central (CST))
  - Summer (DST): UTC-5 (CDT)
- FIPS code: 27-60592
- GNIS feature ID: 0665623

Six Mile Grove Township is a township in Swift County, Minnesota, United States. The population was 171 at the 2000 census.

Six Mile Grove Township was organized in 1866 and named from the fact that a grove was located there stood six miles (9.7 km) from Benson.

== Geography ==
According to the United States Census Bureau, the township has a total area of 36.0 square miles (93.1 km^{2}), of which 35.9 square miles (93.0 km^{2}) is land and 0.04 square mile (0.1 km^{2}) (0.11%) is water.

== Demographics ==
As of the census of 2000, there were 171 people, 63 households, and 51 families residing in the township. The population density was 4.8 people per square mile (1.8/km^{2}). There were 66 housing units at an average density of 1.8/sq mi (0.7/km^{2}). The racial makeup of the township was 100.00% White.

There were 63 households, out of which 30.2% had children under the age of 18 living with them, 77.8% were married couples living together, 3.2% had a female householder with no husband present, and 17.5% were non-families. 15.9% of all households were made up of individuals, and 4.8% had someone living alone who was 65 years of age or older. The average household size was 2.71 and the average family size was 3.02.

In the township, the population was spread out, with 27.5% under the age of 18, 4.7% from 18 to 24, 31.6% from 25 to 44, 25.1% from 45 to 64, and 11.1% who were 65 years of age or older. The median age was 40 years. For every 100 females, there were 103.6 males. For every 100 females age 18 and over, there were 106.7 males.

The median income for a household in the township was $42,083, and the median income for a family was $48,125. Males had a median income of $28,750 versus $20,000 for females. The per capita income for the township was $20,035. None of the families and 0.6% of the population were living below the poverty line, including no under eighteens and 5.9% of those over 64.
