= Fairfield, Minnesota =

Fairfield
- Unincorporated community
- Location within Minnesota Location within the United States
- Coordinates: 45°23′02″N 95°58′25″W
- Country: United States
- State: Minnesota
- County: Swift
- Elevation: 1,112 ft (339 m)
- Time zone: UTC-6 (Central (CST))
  - Summer (DST): UTC-5 (CDT)
- Area code: 320
- GNIS feature ID: 654701

Fairfield is an unincorporated community in Swift County, Minnesota, United States.
