= Appleton Township, Swift County, Minnesota =

Appleton Township, Minnesota
- Township
- Location within the state of Minnesota Appleton Township, Minnesota (the United States)
- Coordinates: 45°11′46″N 96°2′2″W
- Country: United States
- State: Minnesota
- County: Swift

Area
  - Total: 31.9 sq mi (82.5 km^{2})
  - Land: 30.8 sq mi (79.8 km^{2})
  - Water: 1.0 sq mi (2.7 km^{2})
- Elevation: 981 ft (299 m)

Population (2021)
  - Total: 223
  - Density: 7.5/sq mi (2.9/km^{2})
- Time zone: UTC-6 (Central (CST))
  - Summer (DST): UTC-5 (CDT)
- ZIP code: 56208
- Area code: 320
- FIPS code: 27-01882
- GNIS feature ID: 0663445

Appleton Township is a township in Swift County, Minnesota, United States. The population was 223 at the 2021 census.

== History ==
Appleton Township was originally called Phelps Township, after Addison Phelps, a pioneer settler, and under the latter name was organized in 1870. The present name dates from 1872.

== Geography ==
According to the United States Census Bureau, the township has a total area of 31.9 square miles (83 km^{2}), of which 30.8 square miles (80 km^{2}) of it is land and 1.0 square mile (2.6 km^{2}) (3.29%) is water.

== Demographics ==
As of the census of 2000, there were 232 people, 92 households, and 72 families residing in the township. The population density was 7.5 inhabitants per square mile (2.9/km^{2}). There were 102 housing units at an average density of 3.3 per square mile (1.3/km^{2}). The racial makeup of the township was 90.95% White, 0.43% Native American, 5.17% Asian, 2.16% from other races, and 1.29% from two or more races. Hispanic or Latino of any race were 2.16% of the population.

There were 92 households, out of which 27.2% had children under the age of 18 living with them, 66.3% were married couples living together, 6.5% had a female householder with no husband present, and 21.7% were non-families. 16.3% of all households were made up of individuals, and 5.4% had someone living alone who was 65 years of age or older. The average household size was 2.52 and the average family size was 2.81.

In the township the population was spread out, with 22.0% under the age of 18, 3.9% from 18 to 24, 19.8% from 25 to 44, 36.2% from 45 to 64, and 18.1% who were 65 years of age or older. The median age was 47 years. For every 100 females, there were 88.6 males. For every 100 females age 18 and over, there were 96.7 males.

The median income for a household in the township was $48,125, and the median income for a family was $51,071. Males had a median income of $35,714 versus $21,458 for females. The per capita income for the township was $20,714. About 2.6% of families and 4.1% of the population were below the poverty line, including none of those under the age of eighteen and 13.0% of those 65 or over.
