= Edison Township, Swift County, Minnesota =

Edison Township, Minnesota
- Township
- Location within the state of Minnesota Edison Township, Minnesota (the United States)
- Coordinates: 45°11′52″N 95°54′36″W
- Country: United States
- State: Minnesota
- County: Swift

Area
  - Total: 35.8 sq mi (92.6 km^{2})
  - Land: 35.7 sq mi (92.4 km^{2})
  - Water: 0.039 sq mi (0.1 km^{2})
- Elevation: 1,030 ft (314 m)

Population (2000)
  - Total: 131
  - Density: 3.6/sq mi (1.4/km^{2})
- Time zone: UTC-6 (Central (CST))
  - Summer (DST): UTC-5 (CDT)
- FIPS code: 27-18206
- GNIS feature ID: 0664049

Edison Township is a township in Swift County, Minnesota, United States. The population was 131 at the 2000 census.

== History ==
Edison Township was originally called New Posen Township, after Posen, Poland, and under the latter name was organized in 1878. The present name honors Thomas Edison.

== Geography ==
According to the United States Census Bureau, the township has a total area of 35.8 square miles (93 km^{2}), of which 35.7 square miles (92 km^{2}) is land and 0.1 square miles (0.26 km^{2}) (0.17%) is water.

== Demographics ==
As of the census of 2000, there were 131 people, 55 households, and 42 families residing in the township. The population density was 3.7 inhabitants per square mile (1.4/km^{2}). There were 61 housing units at an average density of 1.7 per square mile (0.66/km^{2}). The racial makeup of the township was 93.89% White, 0.76% Asian, 4.58% from other races, and 0.76% from two or more races. Hispanic or Latino of any race were 4.58% of the population.

There were 55 households, out of which 25.5% had children under the age of 18 living with them, 67.3% were married couples living together, 3.6% had a female householder with no husband present, and 23.6% were non-families. 21.8% of all households were made up of individuals, and 10.9% had someone living alone who was 65 years of age or older. The average household size was 2.38 and the average family size was 2.71.

In the township the population was spread out, with 22.1% under the age of 18, 6.1% from 18 to 24, 21.4% from 25 to 44, 32.8% from 45 to 64, and 17.6% who were 65 years of age or older. The median age was 45 years. For every 100 females, there were 98.5 males. For every 100 females age 18 and over, there were 112.5 males.

The median income for a household in the township was $39,375, and the median income for a family was $44,375. Males had a median income of $31,250 versus $21,250 for females. The per capita income for the township was $22,796. There were no families and 0.9% of the population living below the poverty line, including no under eighteens and none of those over 64.
