= Camp A Lake, Minnesota =

Unorganized territory in St. Louis County, Minnesota, United States

Coordinates: 47.61°N 92.62°W

Camp A Lake was an unorganized territory in Saint Louis County, Minnesota, United States. It was annexed into the city of Mountain Iron in 2003. The population was 16 at the 2000 census.

== Geography ==
According to the United States Census Bureau, the unorganized territory has a total area of 18.9 square miles (48.8 km^{2}), of which 18.5 square miles (47.8 km^{2}) is land and 0.4 square mile (1.0 km^{2}; 2.02%) is water.

== Demographics ==
At the 2000 United States census there were 16 people, 6 households, and 4 families living in the unorganized territory. The population density was 0.9 inhabitants per square mile (0.35/km^{2}). There were 6 housing units at an average density of 0.3 per square mile (0.12/km^{2}). The racial makeup of the unorganized territory was 93.75% White, and 6.25% from two or more races. Of the 6 households 33.3% had children under the age of 18 living with them, 33.3% were married couples living together, 16.7% had a female householder with no husband present, and 33.3% were non-families. 16.7% of households were one person and 16.7% were one person aged 65 or older. The average household size was 2.67 and the average family size was 2.75.

The age distribution was 18.8% under the age of 18, 37.5% from 18 to 24, 18.8% from 25 to 44, 18.8% from 45 to 64, and 6.3% 65 or older. The median age was 23 years. For every 100 females, there were 100.0 males. For every 100 females age 18 and over, there were 160.0 males.

The median household income was $25,000 and the median family income was $25,000. Males had a median income of $18,750 versus $14,375 for females. The per capita income for the unorganized territory was $11,978. There were no families and 16.7% of the population living below the poverty line, including no under eighteens and none of those over 64.
