= Camp Lake (California) =

Lake in the state of California, United States

- Location within California
- Location: Emigrant Wilderness; Tuolumne County, California
- Coordinates: 38.166028°N 119.880180°W
- Type: Tarn Lake
- Basin countries: United States
- Surface elevation: 2,314 m (7,592 ft)

Camp Lake is a small tarn located in the Emigrant Wilderness in Tuolumne County, California, approximately 10 km (6.2 mi) north of Yosemite National Park. It is accessible only to hikers and equestrians via the popular Deer Lake Trail.

Once a good fishing lake for Brook Trout, Camp Lake is no longer stocked by the California Department of Fish and Game due to the ongoing restoration of the Mountain Yellow Legged Frog in the Sierra Nevada. The lake once suffered from both winter and summer kills and relied on annual plants to sustain the fish population. The lake no longer contains trout.

== Trail information ==
The Crabtree Camp Trailhead is large and usually full. The trail to Deer Lake descends a little, then begins climbing. Camp Lake, the destination for most hikers, is 2.8 mi (4.5 km) off the trailhead, at 7,590 ft (2,310 m) elevation. Backpackers continue to other lakes beyond.

== See also ==
- List of lakes in California
