= Camp Lake (Swift County, Minnesota) =

Lake in the state of Minnesota, United States

- Location within Minnesota
- Location: Swift County, Minnesota
- Coordinates: 45°24′13″N 95°23′22″W
- Type: Lake
- Surface elevation: 1,142 feet (348 m)

Camp Lake is a lake in Swift County, in the U.S. state of Minnesota.

Camp Lake was so named for a surveyors' camp established near its shore.

== See also ==
- List of lakes in Minnesota
