= Swift County, Minnesota =

County in Minnesota, United States

- County
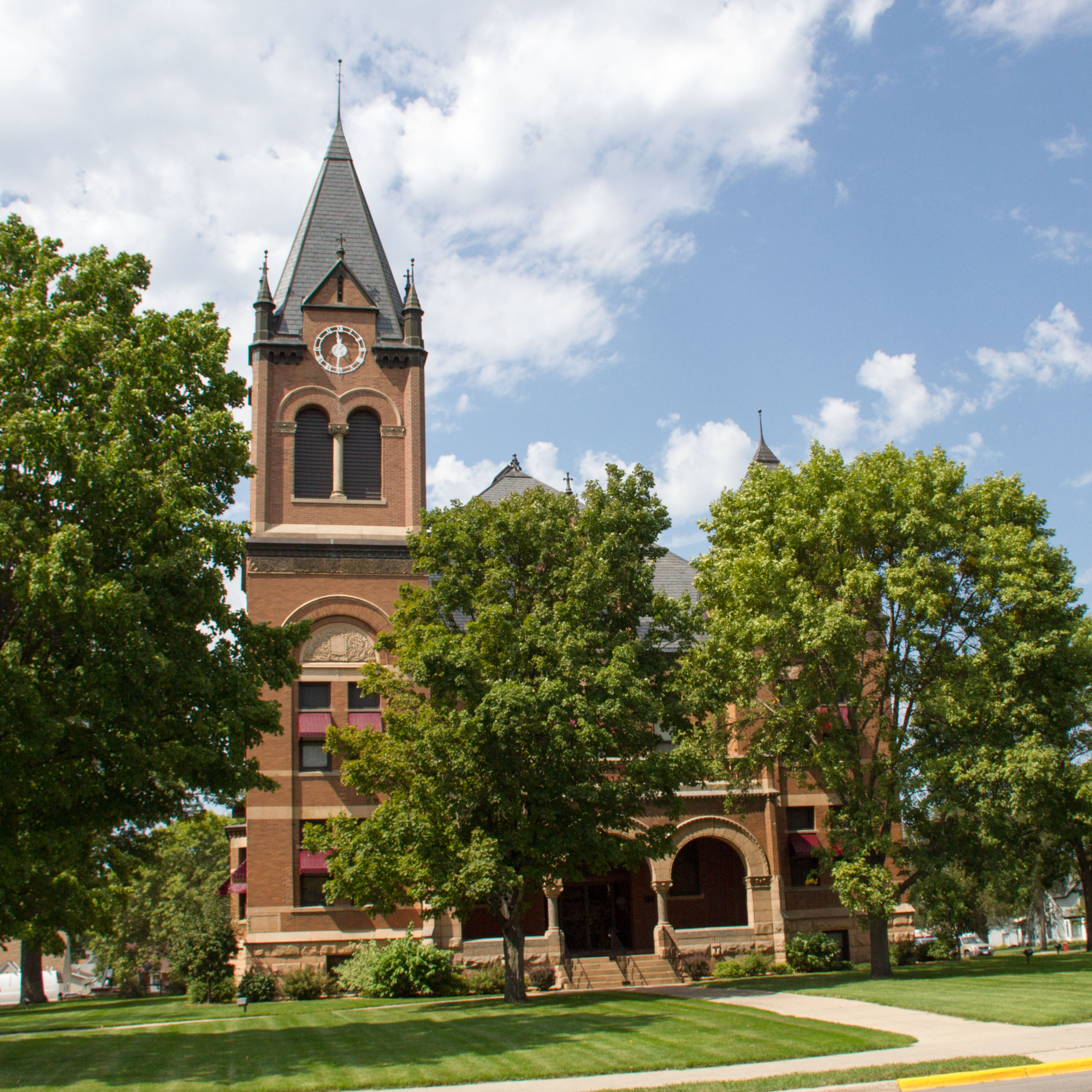
- Swift County Courthouse, Benson

- Location within the U.S. state of Minnesota
- Coordinates: 45°17′N 95°41′W
- Country: United States
- State: Minnesota
- Founded: February 18, 1870
- Named for: Henry Adoniram Swift
- Seat: Benson
- Largest city: Benson

Area
  - Total: 752 sq mi (1,950 km^{2})
  - Land: 742 sq mi (1,920 km^{2})
  - Water: 8.82 sq mi (22.8 km^{2}) 1.3%

Population (2020)
  - Total: 9,838
  - Estimate (2025): 9,763 ▼
  - Density: 13.3/sq mi (5.1/km^{2})
- Time zone: UTC−6 (Central)
  - Summer (DST): UTC−5 (CDT)
- Congressional district: 7th
- Website: swiftcounty.gov

Swift County is a county in the U.S. state of Minnesota. As of the 2020 census, the population was 9,838. Its county seat is Benson.

Swift County is in west central Minnesota and consists of 757 square miles (2,000 km^{2}) with three tiers of seven townships each.

== History ==
The Native Americans in the area before American settlement were the Dakota.

The Indians had grievances against the United States government, including delays in sending annuities that caused near starvation several times. In August 1862, the Dakota War broke out in Minnesota. The warfare reached the settlements just getting started in what was to become northeastern Swift County. By late September 1862, the war was almost over but the settlers hesitated to venture back to the area until 1865, when all danger was apparently over due to the forcible removal of all Native Americans. Scandinavians and Germans were in decided majority among the early settlers. Norwegian settlers were the first in 1866 at Camp Lake and Swenoda.

In 1869, the St. Paul & Pacific Railroad reached Willmar, and the next year it arrived in Benson. The railroad company determined the number of future trading centers (Kerkhoven, DeGraff, Benson, Randall) in the county by locating sites at intervals of approximately 8 miles (13 km).

Swift County was established on February 18, 1870 from Chippewa County and named for Henry Adoniram Swift, the third governor of Minnesota (1863–64) with Benson as the county seat.

The Swift County Courthouse was built in 1897 and was listed on the National Register of Historic Places in 1976. Railroad tracks run through Benson's downtown business district with parks on each side.

=== Historic buildings ===
Historic buildings in Swift County include:

- Gethsemane Episcopal Church in Appleton built in 1879 and listed on the National Register of Historic Places in 2011.

== Geography ==
The Minnesota River flows southeast along the county's lower western border. The Pomme de Terre River flows south-southwest through the county's western part, discharging into the Minnesota. The Chippewa River flows south-southwest through the county's central part, discharging into the Minnesota south of the county. The county's terrain consists of rolling hills, largely devoted to agriculture. It slopes to south and the west, with its highest point near its northeast corner at 1,240 ft (380 m) ASL. The county has an area of 752 square miles (1,950 km^{2}), of which 742 square miles (1,920 km^{2}) is land and 10 square miles (26 km^{2}) (1.3%) is water.

Swift County is primarily agricultural, but also hosts agriculture equipment manufacturers and an ethanol plant. It has 24 lakes and nine rivers and streams. Lake Oliver is one of the county's biggest, at 416 acres (1.7 km^{2}). Caltopo shows the true highpoint to be 1300 ft in elevation about 1/3 of a mile southwest of the Monson State Wildlife Management Area:latitude 45.3046&longitude=-95.3031

Soils of Swift County

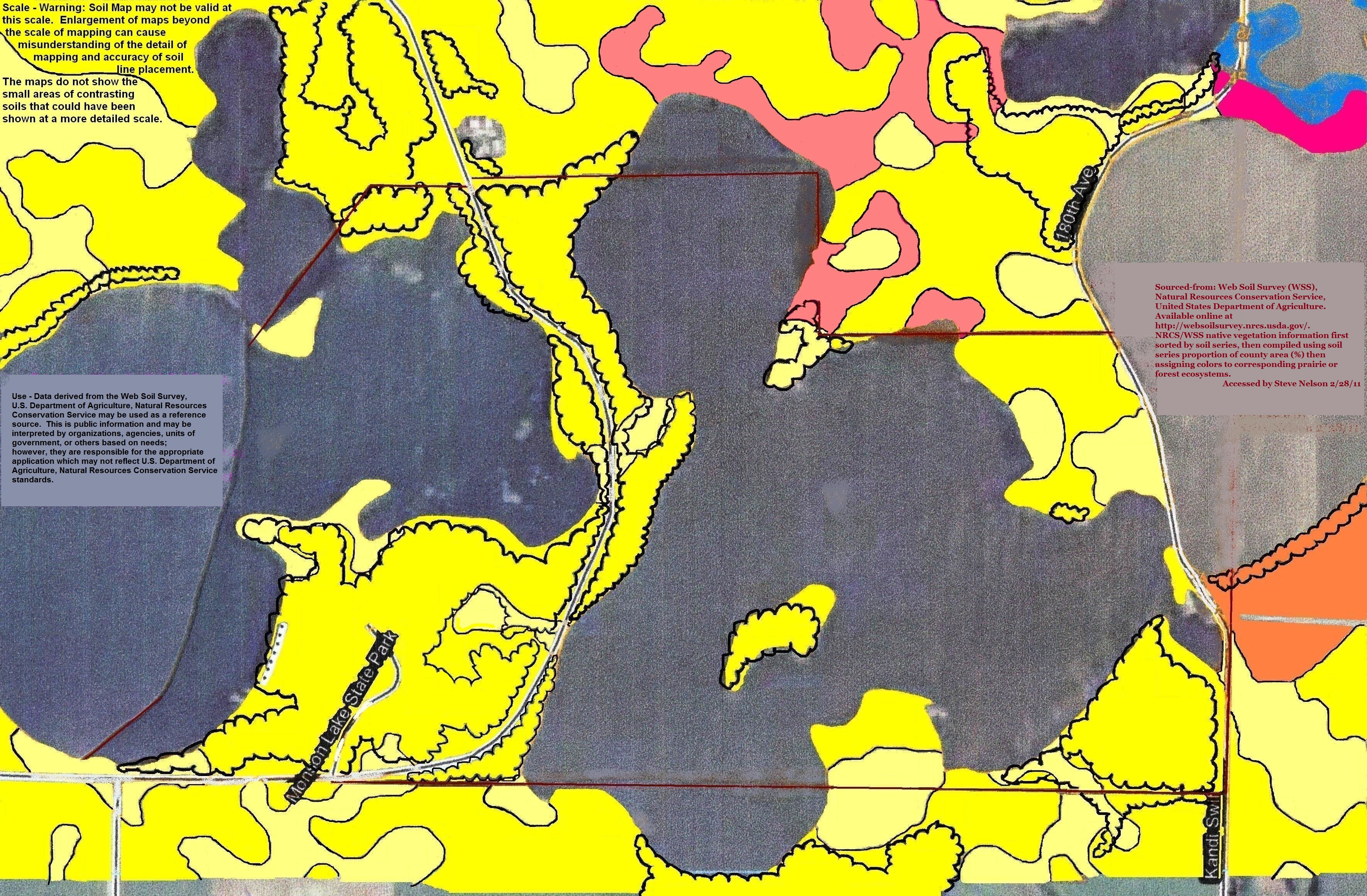
Soils of Monson Lake State Park area

== Major highways ==
- U.S. Highway 12
- U.S. Highway 59
- Minnesota State Highway 7
- Minnesota State Highway 9
- Minnesota State Highway 29
- Minnesota State Highway 104
- Minnesota State Highway 119

=== Adjacent counties ===
- Stevens County - northwest
- Pope County - northeast
- Kandiyohi County - east
- Chippewa County - south
- Lac qui Parle County - southwest
- Big Stone County - west

=== Airport ===
Appleton Municipal Airport provides general aviation service for Swift County.

=== Protected areas ===
- Bench State Wildlife Management Area
- Camp Kerk State Wildlife Management Area
- Danvers State Wildlife Management Area
- Ehrenburg State Wildlife Management Area
- Hayes-Myhre State Wildlife Management Area
- Henry X State Wildlife Management Area
- Hollerberg Lake State Wildlife Management Area
- Monson Lake State Park

== Demographics ==
Historical population
Census	Pop.	Note	%±
1880	7,473		—
1890	10,161		36.0%
1900	13,503		32.9%
1910	12,949		−4.1%
1920	15,093		16.6%
1930	14,735		−2.4%
1940	15,469		5.0%
1950	15,837		2.4%
1960	14,936		−5.7%
1970	13,177		−11.8%
1980	12,920		−2.0%
1990	10,724		−17.0%
2000	11,956		11.5%
2010	9,783		−18.2%
2020	9,838		0.6%
2025 (est.)	9,763	▼	−0.8%
U.S. Decennial Census; 1790-1960 1900-1990; 1990-2000 2010-2020

=== Racial and ethnic composition ===
Swift County, Minnesota – Racial and ethnic composition Note: the US Census treats Hispanic/Latino as an ethnic category. This table excludes Latinos from the racial categories and assigns them to a separate category. Hispanics/Latinos may be of any race.
Race / Ethnicity (NH = Non-Hispanic)	Pop 1980	Pop 1990	Pop 2000	Pop 2010	Pop 2020	% 1980	% 1990	% 2000	% 2010	% 2020
White alone (NH)	12,824	10,566	10,728	9,271	8,618	99.26%	98.53%	89.73%	94.77%	87.60%
Black or African American alone (NH)	2	4	319	48	79	0.02%	0.04%	2.67%	0.49%	0.80%
Native American or Alaska Native alone (NH)	19	37	59	30	26	0.15%	0.35%	0.49%	0.31%	0.26%
Asian alone (NH)	36	37	167	21	78	0.28%	0.35%	1.40%	0.21%	0.79%
Native Hawaiian or Pacific Islander alone (NH)	x	x	179	3	133	x	x	1.50%	0.03%	1.35%
Other race alone (NH)	6	1	3	0	5	0.05%	0.01%	0.03%	0.00%	0.05%
Mixed race or Multiracial (NH)	x	x	181	60	237	x	x	1.51%	0.61%	2.41%
Hispanic or Latino (any race)	33	79	320	350	662	0.26%	0.74%	2.68%	3.58%	6.73%
Total	12,920	10,724	11,956	9,783	9,838	100.00%	100.00%	100.00%	100.00%	100.00%

=== 2020 census ===
As of the 2020 census, the county had a population of 9,838. The median age was 42.6 years. 23.3% of residents were under the age of 18 and 22.5% of residents were 65 years of age or older. For every 100 females there were 101.0 males, and for every 100 females age 18 and over there were 99.9 males age 18 and over.

The racial makeup of the county was 89.5% White, 0.9% Black or African American, 0.5% American Indian and Alaska Native, 0.8% Asian, 1.4% Native Hawaiian and Pacific Islander, 2.8% from some other race, and 4.2% from two or more races. Hispanic or Latino residents of any race comprised 6.7% of the population.

<0.1% of residents lived in urban areas, while 100.0% lived in rural areas.

There were 4,064 households in the county, of which 27.1% had children under the age of 18 living in them. Of all households, 48.5% were married-couple households, 21.2% were households with a male householder and no spouse or partner present, and 23.5% were households with a female householder and no spouse or partner present. About 32.3% of all households were made up of individuals and 15.1% had someone living alone who was 65 years of age or older.

There were 4,693 housing units, of which 13.4% were vacant. Among occupied housing units, 73.0% were owner-occupied and 27.0% were renter-occupied. The homeowner vacancy rate was 2.9% and the rental vacancy rate was 9.6%.

=== 2000 census ===
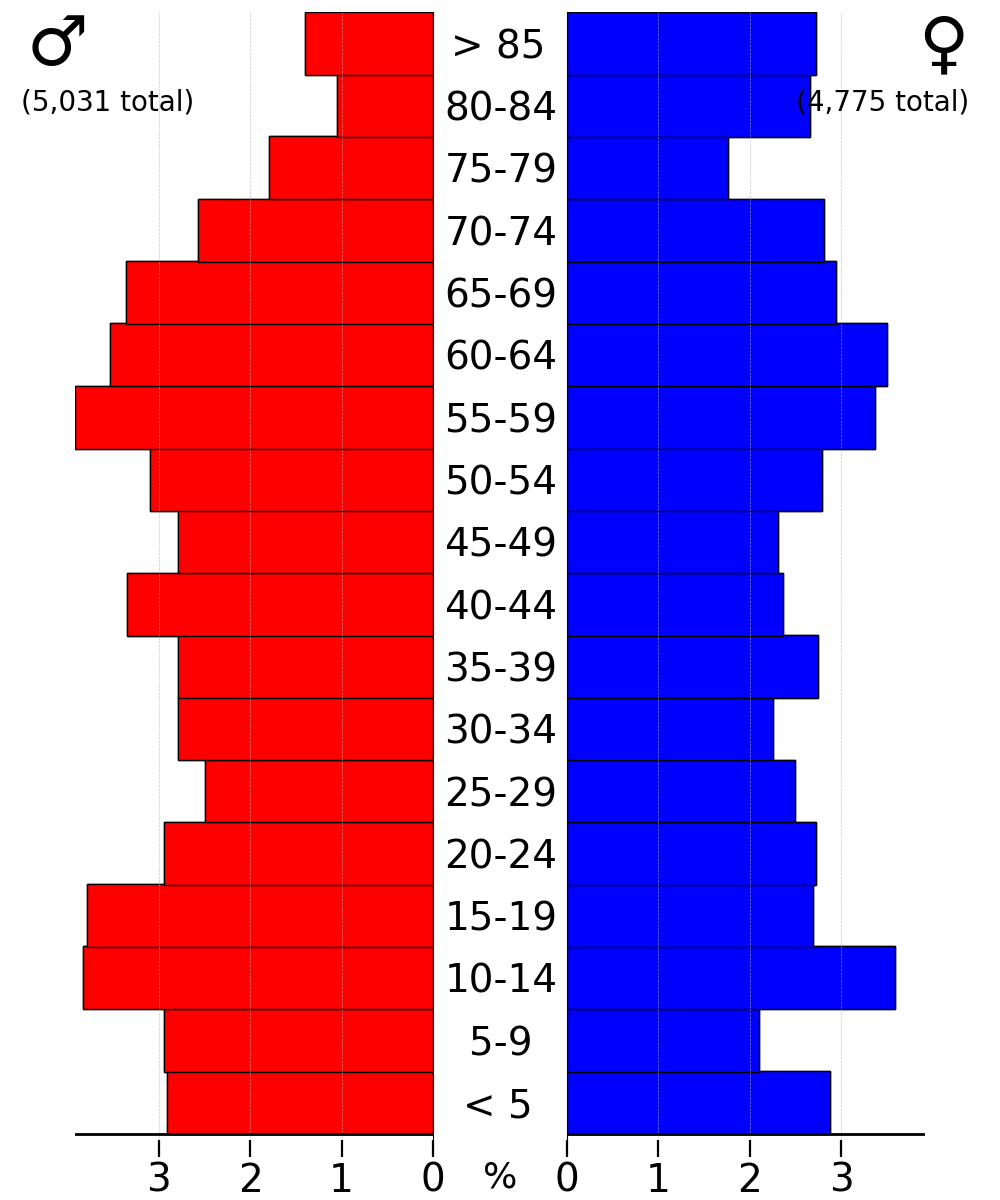
2022 US Census population pyramid for Swift County, from ACS 5-year estimates

As of the census of 2000, there were 11,956 people, 4,353 households, and 2,881 families in the county. The population density was 16.1 per square mile (6.2/km^{2}). There were 4,821 housing units at an average density of 6.50 per square mile (2.51/km^{2}). The racial makeup of the county was 90.67% White, 2.69% Black or African American, 0.50% Native American, 1.43% Asian, 1.52% Pacific Islander, 1.40% from other races, and 1.79% from two or more races. 2.68% of the population were Hispanic or Latino of any race. Swift County has the highest percentage of Pacific Islander natives out of any U.S. county outside Hawaii. 34.4% were of German, 30.5% Norwegian, 5.2% Swedish and 5.1% Irish ancestry.

There were 4,353 households, out of which 30.00% had children under the age of 18 living with them, 56.90% were married couples living together, 6.10% had a female householder with no husband present, and 33.80% were non-families. 30.90% of all households were made up of individuals, and 17.60% had someone living alone who was 65 years of age or older. The average household size was 2.39 and the average family size was 3.00.

The county population contained 23.00% under the age of 18, 7.30% from 18 to 24, 29.60% from 25 to 44, 21.60% from 45 to 64, and 18.50% who were 65 years of age or older. The median age was 39 years. For every 100 females there were 120.60 males. For every 100 females age 18 and over, there were 124.60 males.

The median income for a household in the county was $34,820, and the median income for a family was $44,208. Males had a median income of $29,362 versus $21,667 for females. The per capita income for the county was $16,360. About 5.30% of families and 8.40% of the population were below the poverty line, including 6.90% of those under age 18 and 13.80% of those age 65 or over.

== Communities ==
=== Cities ===
- Appleton
- Benson (county seat)
- Clontarf
- Danvers
- De Graff
- Holloway
- Kerkhoven
- Murdock

=== Unincorporated communities ===
- Fairfield
- Swift Falls

=== Townships ===
- Appleton Township
- Benson Township
- Camp Lake Township
- Cashel Township
- Clontarf Township
- Dublin Township
- Edison Township
- Fairfield Township
- Hayes Township
- Hegbert Township
- Kerkhoven Township
- Kildare Township
- Marysland Township
- Moyer Township
- Pillsbury Township
- Shible Township
- Six Mile Grove Township
- Swenoda Township
- Tara Township
- Torning Township
- West Bank Township

== Politics ==
Swift County was traditionally a Democratic stronghold, as it voted Democratic in every election from 1932 to 2012 with the exception of the 1952 landslide victory of Dwight D. Eisenhower. In 2016, a dramatic swing against the Democrats in the Rust Belt saw Swift County shifting a massive 36% toward the Republican Party, with Donald Trump winning it over Hillary Clinton by 26%, and further increasing his margin of victory to nearly 30% against Joe Biden in 2020, and to over 34% against Kamala Harris in 2024. Each of these were the best Republican performances in the county since 1920.

United States presidential election results for Swift County, Minnesota
Year	Republican		Democratic		Third party(ies)	
Year	No.	%	No.	%	No.	%
1892	762	37.39%	712	34.94%	564	27.67%
1896	1,273	49.78%	1,222	47.79%	62	2.42%
1900	1,378	55.25%	1,028	41.22%	88	3.53%
1904	1,784	76.37%	462	19.78%	90	3.85%
1908	1,343	56.17%	921	38.52%	127	5.31%
1912	442	16.92%	937	35.86%	1,234	47.23%
1916	1,335	50.21%	1,181	44.42%	143	5.38%
1920	3,553	70.22%	985	19.47%	522	10.32%
1924	1,654	33.60%	334	6.79%	2,934	59.61%
1928	2,791	49.72%	2,733	48.69%	89	1.59%
1932	1,308	22.62%	4,339	75.04%	135	2.33%
1936	1,618	27.03%	3,749	62.63%	619	10.34%
1940	2,815	41.59%	3,899	57.61%	54	0.80%
1944	2,519	42.87%	3,310	56.33%	47	0.80%
1948	2,109	32.61%	4,082	63.11%	277	4.28%
1952	3,532	51.40%	3,291	47.90%	48	0.70%
1956	2,637	41.43%	3,720	58.44%	8	0.13%
1960	2,848	41.11%	4,062	58.63%	18	0.26%
1964	2,132	32.68%	4,380	67.14%	12	0.18%
1968	2,476	38.38%	3,716	57.60%	259	4.01%
1972	2,673	40.40%	3,823	57.78%	121	1.83%
1976	2,190	32.39%	4,428	65.48%	144	2.13%
1980	2,943	43.13%	3,245	47.56%	635	9.31%
1984	2,893	44.59%	3,531	54.42%	64	0.99%
1988	2,156	37.19%	3,579	61.73%	63	1.09%
1992	1,603	26.76%	2,980	49.74%	1,408	23.50%
1996	1,541	28.91%	3,054	57.30%	735	13.79%
2000	2,376	43.70%	2,698	49.62%	363	6.68%
2004	2,481	43.26%	3,165	55.19%	89	1.55%
2008	2,184	41.65%	2,907	55.43%	153	2.92%
2012	2,248	43.91%	2,751	53.74%	120	2.34%
2016	2,963	59.33%	1,686	33.76%	345	6.91%
2020	3,316	63.86%	1,784	34.35%	93	1.79%
2024	3,340	66.09%	1,618	32.01%	96	1.90%

== See also ==
- National Register of Historic Places listings in Swift County, Minnesota
