= Sugar Camp Lake =

Lake in Wisconsin, United States

- Location within Wisconsin Location within the United States
- Coordinates: 45°48′06″N 89°18′21″W
- Surface area: 519 acres (210 ha)
- Max. depth: 38 feet (12 m)
- Surface elevation: 1,650 feet (500 m)
- Settlements: Sugar Camp

Sugar Camp Lake is a freshwater lake located in Sugar Camp, Oneida County, Wisconsin, United States. The town of Sugar Camp has a public beach on this lake off of Wisconsin Highway 17.

Activities at the lake include fishing, slalom and barefoot ski. Slightly elevated levels of mercury exist. Curiously this lake is split into an northern and southern portion connected by a narrow channel (5-30 feet across depending on the water level).
