= National Register of Historic Places listings in Swift County, Minnesota =

Location of Swift County in Minnesota

This is a list of the National Register of Historic Places listings in Swift County, Minnesota. It is intended to be a complete list of the properties and districts on the National Register of Historic Places in Swift County, Minnesota, United States. The locations of National Register properties and districts for which the latitude and longitude coordinates are included below, may be seen in an online map.

There are eight properties and districts listed on the National Register in the county, and one former listing.

This National Park Service list is complete through NPS recent listings posted May 1, 2026.

== Current listings ==
	Name on the Register	Image	Date listed	Location	City or town	Description
1	Appleton City Hall	Appleton City Hall	June 17, 1977 (#77000770)	23 S. Miles St. 45°11′59″N 96°01′09″W	Appleton	One of rural western Minnesota's few monumental 19th-century buildings, constructed in 1895; noted for its Richardsonian Romanesque architecture and long civic use.
2	Christ Church-Episcopal	Christ Church-Episcopal	August 15, 1985 (#85001761)	310 13th St. N. 45°18′57″N 95°35′57″W	Benson	Benson's oldest church, built in early Gothic Revival style in 1879, symbolizing the missionary efforts of the Episcopal Church in rural Minnesota and the city's English and New Englander settlers.
3	Church of St. Bridget-Catholic	Church of St. Bridget-Catholic	August 15, 1985 (#85001768)	501 3rd St. S. 45°15′33″N 95°28′09″W	De Graff	Large 1901 church anchoring the first parish established during Archbishop John Ireland's major drive to resettle Catholics in western Minnesota. Also noted as a rare outstate church designed by Saint Paul architect Edward J. Donahue.
4	Church of St. Francis Xavier-Catholic	Church of St. Francis Xavier-Catholic	August 15, 1985 (#85001753)	508 13th St. N. 45°19′06″N 95°35′52″W	Benson	One of west-central Minnesota's most architecturally sophisticated churches, designed in Renaissance Revival style by Emmanuel Louis Masqueray and built in 1917 for a parish of Swift County's substantial Catholic population.
5	Gethsemane Episcopal Church	Gethsemane Episcopal Church	July 20, 2011 (#11000469)	40 N. Hering St. 45°12′03″N 96°01′02″W	Appleton	1879 church representing the westernmost expansion of the Episcopal Church in southern Minnesota under Bishop Henry Benjamin Whipple.
6	Monson Lake State Park CCC/WPA/Rustic Style Historic Resources	Monson Lake State Park CCC/WPA/Rustic Style Historic Resources	October 25, 1989 (#89001666)	1690 15th St. N.E. 45°19′16″N 95°16′31″W	Sunburg vicinity	Early and largely unchanged memorial park with two buildings constructed 1937–38, significant as examples of New Deal federal work relief, early Minnesota state park development, and NPS Rustic architecture.
7	Swift County Courthouse	Swift County Courthouse	September 19, 1977 (#77000771)	301 14th St. N. 45°19′01″N 95°36′04″W	Benson	1898 courthouse, the longstanding seat of Swift County government and an exemplary late-19th-century Richardsonian Romanesque public building.
8	Christian F. Uytendale Farmstead	Christian F. Uytendale Farmstead	September 5, 1985 (#85001989)	Off County Highway 25; 45°23′10″N 95°34′19″W	Benson vicinity	One of Swift County's first and most prominent farmsteads, established in 1868 and owned 1879–1902 by a wealthy Danish immigrant, who added an 1887 farmhouse with regionally unique ethnic design features.

== Former listings ==
	Name on the Register	Image	Date listed	Date removed	Location	City or town	Description
1	Sabin S. Murdock House	Sabin S. Murdock House	August 15, 1985 (#85001752)	May 7, 2026	631 Clara Ave. 45°13′26″N 95°23′26″W	Murdock	West-central Minnesota's most prominent house of a single individual who established and promoted a rural townsite, the 1878 home of Murdock's founder Sabin S. Murdock (1830–1900). Demolished in 2025.

== See also ==
- List of National Historic Landmarks in Minnesota
- National Register of Historic Places listings in Minnesota
