= Christian F. Uytendale Farmstead =

- U.S. National Register of Historic Places
- U.S. Historic district
- Uytendale barn in 2020

- Location within Minnesota Location within the United States
- Location: Off County Highway 25, Benson Township, Minnesota
- Coordinates: 45°23′11″N 95°34′18″W
- Area: 2.5 acres (1.0 ha)
- Built: 1887–1935
- NRHP reference No.: 85001989
- Designated HD: September 5, 1985

The Christian F. Uytendale Farmstead is a historic farm in Benson Township, Minnesota, United States. The property was established as one of the first farms in Swift County, Minnesota, in 1868, by Norwegian immigrant Johannes Torgerson (1823–1909). In 1879 Torgerson sold it to "Captain" Christian F. Uytendale (1842–1912), a wealthy Danish immigrant who turned the 280-acre (110 ha) farm into a prominent local landmark.

The farmhouse in 2020

In 1887 Uytendale had a new farmhouse built with distinctive Danish architectural features.

The farm was listed on the National Register of Historic Places in 1985 for having local significance in the themes of architecture and exploration/settlement. The 2.5-acre (1.0 ha) historic district consists of the 1887 farmhouse, a granary built for Uytendale around 1900, and six early-20th-century outbuildings constructed by later owners. The farm was nominated for its status as one of Swift County's first farms, its association with one of the county's most famous turn-of-the-20th-century farmers, and its unique ethnically inspired farmhouse.

== See also ==
- National Register of Historic Places listings in Swift County, Minnesota
