= Torrey Westrom =

American politician

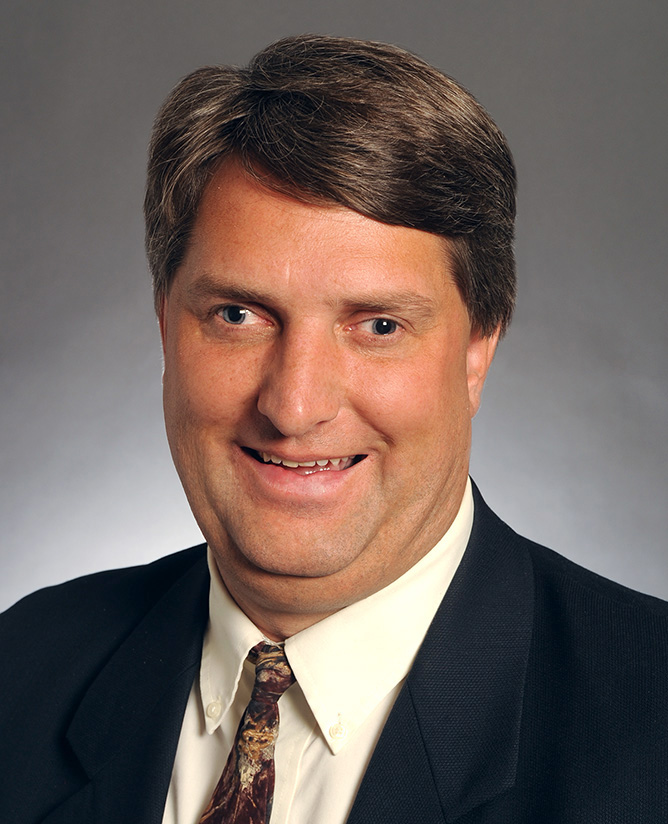

Member of the Minnesota Senate from the 12th district
- Incumbent
- Assumed office January 8, 2013
- Preceded by: Paul Gazelka

Member of the Minnesota House of Representatives from the 11A district 13A (1997–2003)
- In office January 7, 1997 – January 7, 2013
- Preceded by: Chuck Brown
- Succeeded by: district redrawn

Personal details
- Born: March 27, 1973 (age 53) Golden Valley, Minnesota, U.S.
- Party: Republican
- Education: Bemidji State University; William Mitchell College of Law
- Profession: Attorney, businessman, legislator

Torrey Westrom (born March 27, 1973) is an American businessman and politician and member of the Minnesota Senate. A Republican, he represents District 12, which includes all or parts of Big Stone, Douglas, Grant, Pope, Stearns, Stevens, Traverse and Wilkin Counties. He is the first known blind person to be elected to the Minnesota Legislature.

== Political career ==
Westrom has served on several legislative commissions, including the Rural Health Care Advisory Task Force, the Secretary of State's voting equipment task force, and the Minnesota Legislative Audit Commission. In 2002, President George W. Bush appointed him to a four-year term on a federal advisory panel called the Ticket to Work. The panel advised Congress and the White House on return-to-work programs for people with disabilities.

=== Minnesota House of Representatives ===
Westrom is a former member of the Minnesota House of Representatives representing District 11A. He was first elected in 1996 and was reelected every two years until he ran for the Minnesota Senate. Before the 2002 legislative redistricting, he represented the old District 13A. On May 17, 2011 he was called upon to act as Speaker Pro Tempore, making him the first known blind person to oversee a state legislative debate in the United States.

=== Minnesota Senate ===
Westrom was elected to the Minnesota Senate in 2012. As a senator, he has promoted affordable, reliable energy for Minnesota and supported investments in clean energy, such as research into "green ammonia" at the University of Minnesota-Morris and other carbon-free gas energy solutions. In March 2023 he advocated for private prisons, particularly Prairie Correctional Facility in Appleton, Minnesota.

=== Run for Congress ===
In December 2013, less than a year into his Senate term, Westrom announced that he would challenge incumbent Collin Peterson in Minnesota's 7th congressional district in 2014. He kicked off his campaign with events in Elbow Lake and Moorhead. He raised over $84,000 in the first month of his campaign. In the November general election, he won 46% of the vote, the highest Republican tally against Peterson since 1990.

== Personal life ==
Westrom graduated from Bemidji State University in 1995 with a B.A. in political science and business administration and from Mitchell Hamline School of Law in 2003 with a J.D.

Westrom and his wife own TSI Real Estate, based in Elbow Lake, with properties in Hutchinson, Saint Paul, Madelia, and elsewhere.
