= Appleton City Hall =

- U.S. National Register of Historic Places
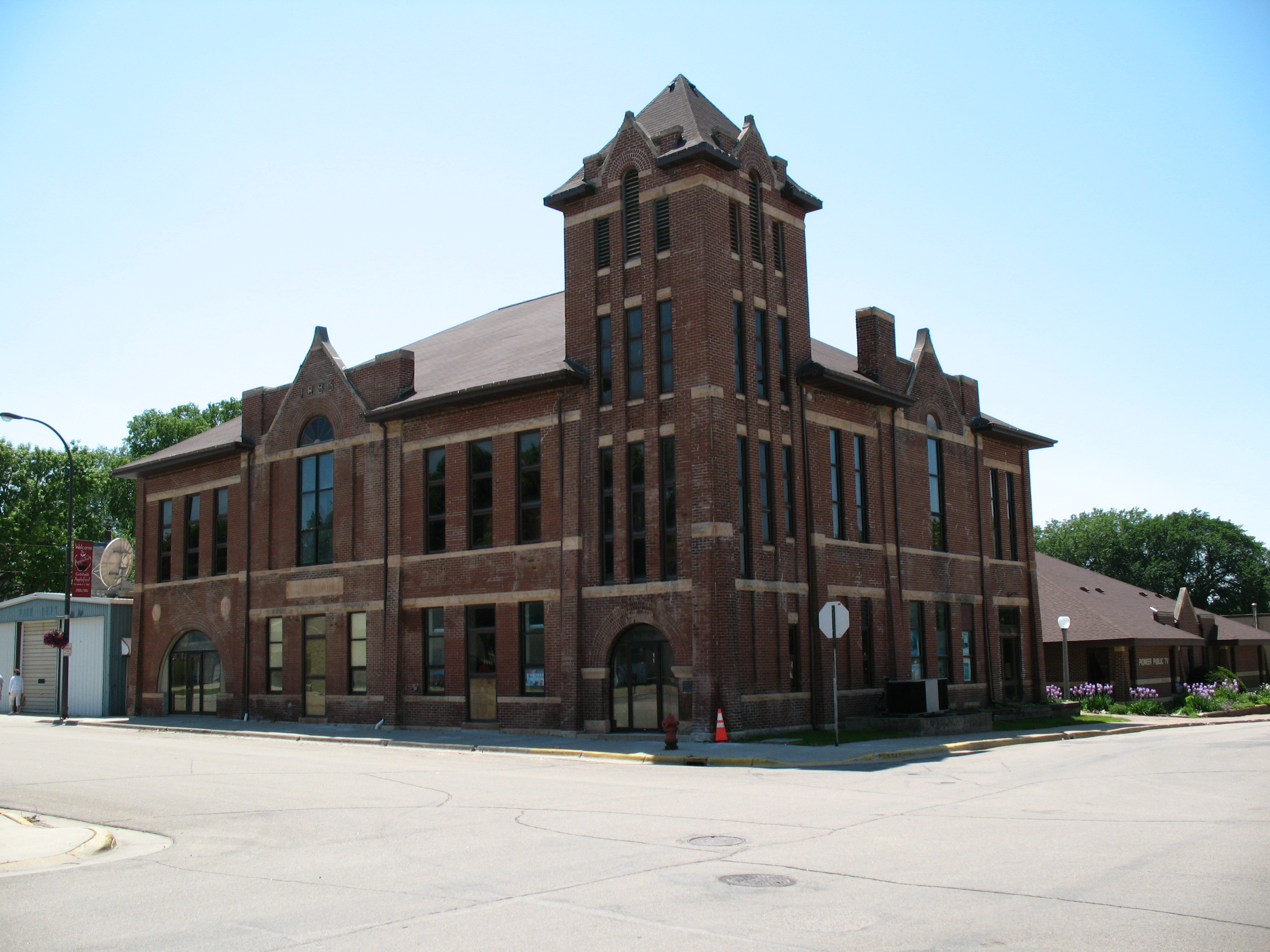
- Appleton City Hall from the northeast

- Location within Minnesota Location within the United States
- Location: 23 South Miles Street, Appleton, Minnesota
- Coordinates: 45°11′59″N 96°1′9″W
- Area: .25 acres (0.10 ha)
- Built: 1895
- Architect: N.W. Hawkinson
- Architectural style: Romanesque Revival
- NRHP reference No.: 77000770
- Designated: June 17, 1977

Appleton City Hall is a historic municipal building in Appleton, Minnesota, United States. It was built in 1895 as one of the few monumental 19th-century buildings in rural western Minnesota. It initially housed Appleton's government offices, fire department, and jail on the ground floor and an auditorium on the upper floor. The city hall was listed on the National Register of Historic Places in 1977 for having local significance in the themes of architecture and politics/government. It was nominated for supposedly being an example of Richardsonian Romanesque architecture and for its long service as a local government and community center. However other sources describe the building's style less specifically as Romanesque Revival, and its municipal services relocated to other facilities in 1976.

== See also ==
- List of city and town halls in the United States
- National Register of Historic Places listings in Swift County, Minnesota
