= Aaron Peterson =

American politician

Member of the Minnesota House of Representatives from the 20A district
- In office January 7, 2003 – January 5, 2009
- Preceded by: Doug Peterson
- Succeeded by: Andrew Falk

Personal details
- Born: September 25, 1970 (age 56)
- Party: Democratic (DFL)
- Spouse: Leah
- Education: Colorado State University; University of Washington
- Profession: land use consultant, legislator

Aaron Peterson (born September 25, 1970) is a former Democratic-Farmer-Labor Party member of the Minnesota House of Representatives, having represented District 20A in southwestern Minnesota. From the town of Madison, Peterson was first elected in 2002 and served three terms, leaving office in January 2009.

Peterson has expressed interest in one day running for the United States Senate.
