= Murdock, Minnesota =

City in Minnesota, United States

Murdock
- City
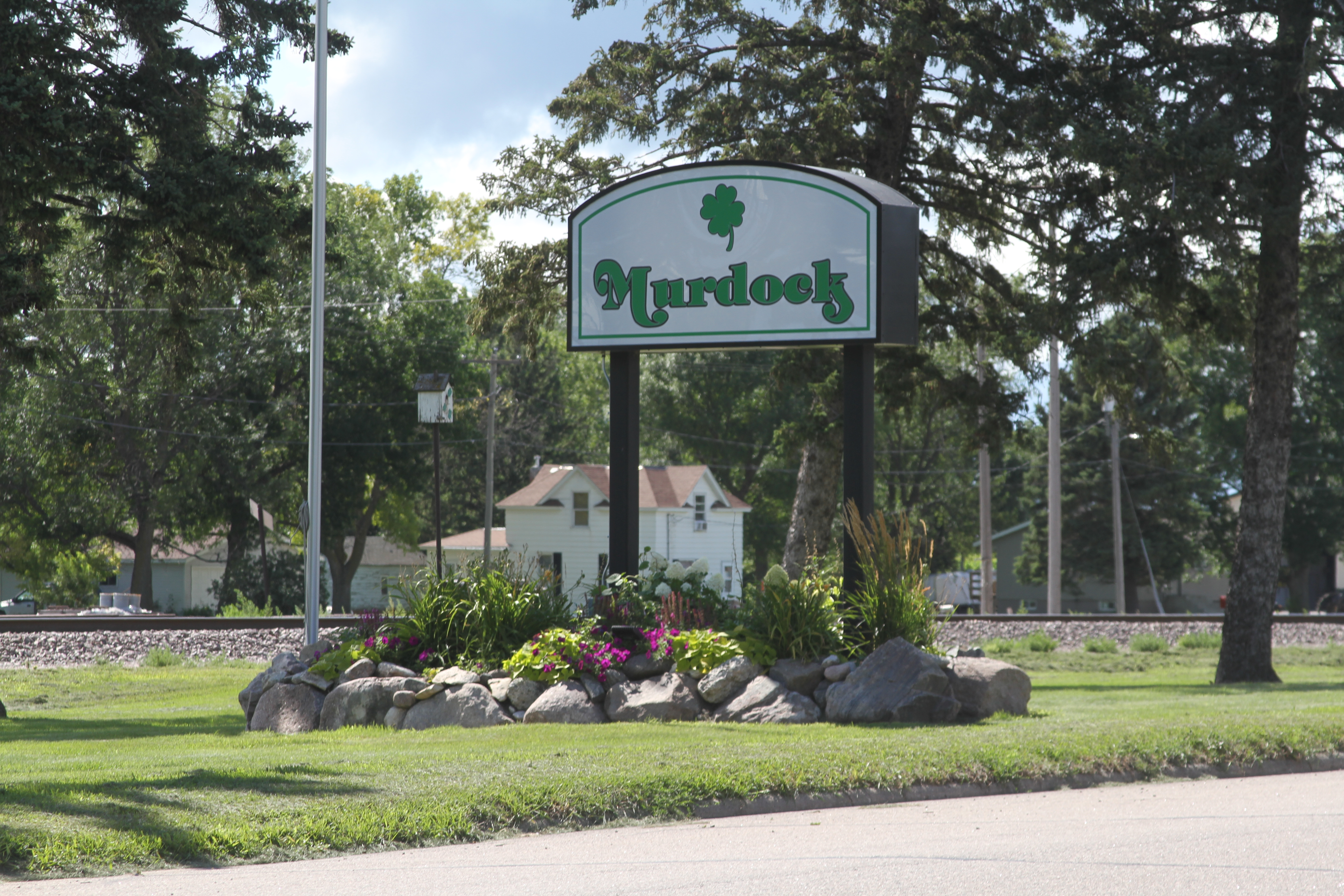

- Location of Murdock, Minnesota
- Coordinates: 45°13′24″N 95°23′41″W
- Country: United States
- State: Minnesota
- County: Swift

Area
  - Total: 0.62 sq mi (1.61 km^{2})
  - Land: 0.62 sq mi (1.61 km^{2})
  - Water: 0 sq mi (0.00 km^{2})
- Elevation: 1,086 ft (331 m)

Population (2020)
  - Total: 306
  - Density: 492/sq mi (189.9/km^{2})
- Time zone: UTC-6 (Central (CST))
  - Summer (DST): UTC-5 (CDT)
- ZIP code: 56271
- Area code: 320
- FIPS code: 27-44818
- GNIS feature ID: 2395140
- Website: City website

Murdock is a rural town in Swift County, Minnesota, United States. The population was 306 at the 2020 census. The city is part of the Kerkhoven-Murdock-Sunburg (KMS) school district. Murdock has Kerkhoven-Murdock-Sunburg Elementary School which is for grades PreK-5.

== History ==
A post office has been in operation at Murdock since 1878. Murdock was platted in 1881 by S. S. Murdock, and named for him. Murdock was incorporated in 1881.

Sabin S. Murdock, who platted the town that was to bear his name, had purchased 3,000 acres of land from the St. Paul and Pacific Railroad in Dublin Township in 1876 for the purpose of developing a new business district along the rail line midway between DeGraff and Kerkhoven. In the town's first years, Murdock was the dominant landowner as well as a farmer, a grain elevator and one of the largest stables in the community.

The Asatru Folk Assembly (AFA), a neo-pagan organization, purchased the former Calvary Lutheran Church in the town for use as a gathering place for members of the Northern Great Plains. The Murdock Town Council voted on December 9, 2020 to allow the AFA conditional approval to use the former church, which caused uproar as the AFA only allows white people to become members of the religion, leading to accusations of racism against the AFA and Murdock.

== Geography ==
According to the United States Census Bureau, the city has a total area of 0.56 square miles (1.45 km^{2}), all land.

U.S. Route 12 serves as a main route in the community.

== Demographics ==
Historical population
Census	Pop.	Note	%±
1890	130		—
1900	275		111.5%
1910	288		4.7%
1920	391		35.8%
1930	326		−16.6%
1940	334		2.5%
1950	393		17.7%
1960	381		−3.1%
1970	358		−6.0%
1980	343		−4.2%
1990	282		−17.8%
2000	303		7.4%
2010	278		−8.3%
2020	306		10.1%
U.S. Decennial Census

=== 2010 census ===
As of the census of 2010, there were 278 people, 117 households, and 74 families living in the city. The population density was 496.4 inhabitants per square mile (191.7/km^{2}). There were 131 housing units at an average density of 233.9 per square mile (90.3/km^{2}). The racial makeup of the city was 95.0% White, 4.0% from other races, and 1.1% from two or more races. Hispanic or Latino of any race were 7.2% of the population.

There were 117 households, of which 32.5% had children under the age of 18 living with them, 47.9% were married couples living together, 9.4% had a female householder with no husband present, 6.0% had a male householder with no wife present, and 36.8% were non-families. 33.3% of all households were made up of individuals, and 12.8% had someone living alone who was 65 years of age or older. The average household size was 2.38 and the average family size was 3.07.

The median age in the city was 37.4 years. 27% of residents were under the age of 18; 7% were between the ages of 18 and 24; 27.8% were from 25 to 44; 28.1% were from 45 to 64; and 10.4% were 65 years of age or older. The gender makeup of the city was 48.2% male and 51.8% female.

=== 2000 census ===
As of the census of 2000, there were 303 people, 126 households, and 77 families living in the city. The population density was 538.5 inhabitants per square mile (207.9/km^{2}). There were 150 housing units at an average density of 266.6 per square mile (102.9/km^{2}). The racial makeup of the city was 95.05% White, 0.66% African American, 3.96% from other races, and 0.33% from two or more races. Hispanic or Latino of any race were 8.25% of the population.

There were 126 households, out of which 32.5% had children under the age of 18 living with them, 49.2% were married couples living together, 11.1% had a female householder with no husband present, and 38.1% were non-families. 34.9% of all households were made up of individuals, and 17.5% had someone living alone who was 65 years of age or older. The average household size was 2.40 and the average family size was 3.15.

In the city, the population was spread out, with 30.0% under the age of 18, 7.9% from 18 to 24, 27.1% from 25 to 44, 14.5% from 45 to 64, and 20.5% who were 65 years of age or older. The median age was 35 years. For every 100 females, there were 98.0 males. For every 100 females age 18 and over, there were 96.3 males.

The median income for a household in the city was $28,750, and the median income for a family was $40,000. Males had a median income of $25,781 versus $16,477 for females. The per capita income for the city was $17,011. About 8.3% of families and 7.4% of the population were below the poverty line, including 10.1% of those under the age of eighteen and 6.5% of those 65 or over.

== Notable people ==
- Andrew Falk - farmer and state legislator
- David Frederickson - former Commissioner of the Minnesota Department of Agriculture
- Howard Wads Rundquist - businessman, teacher, and state legislator

== Gallery ==
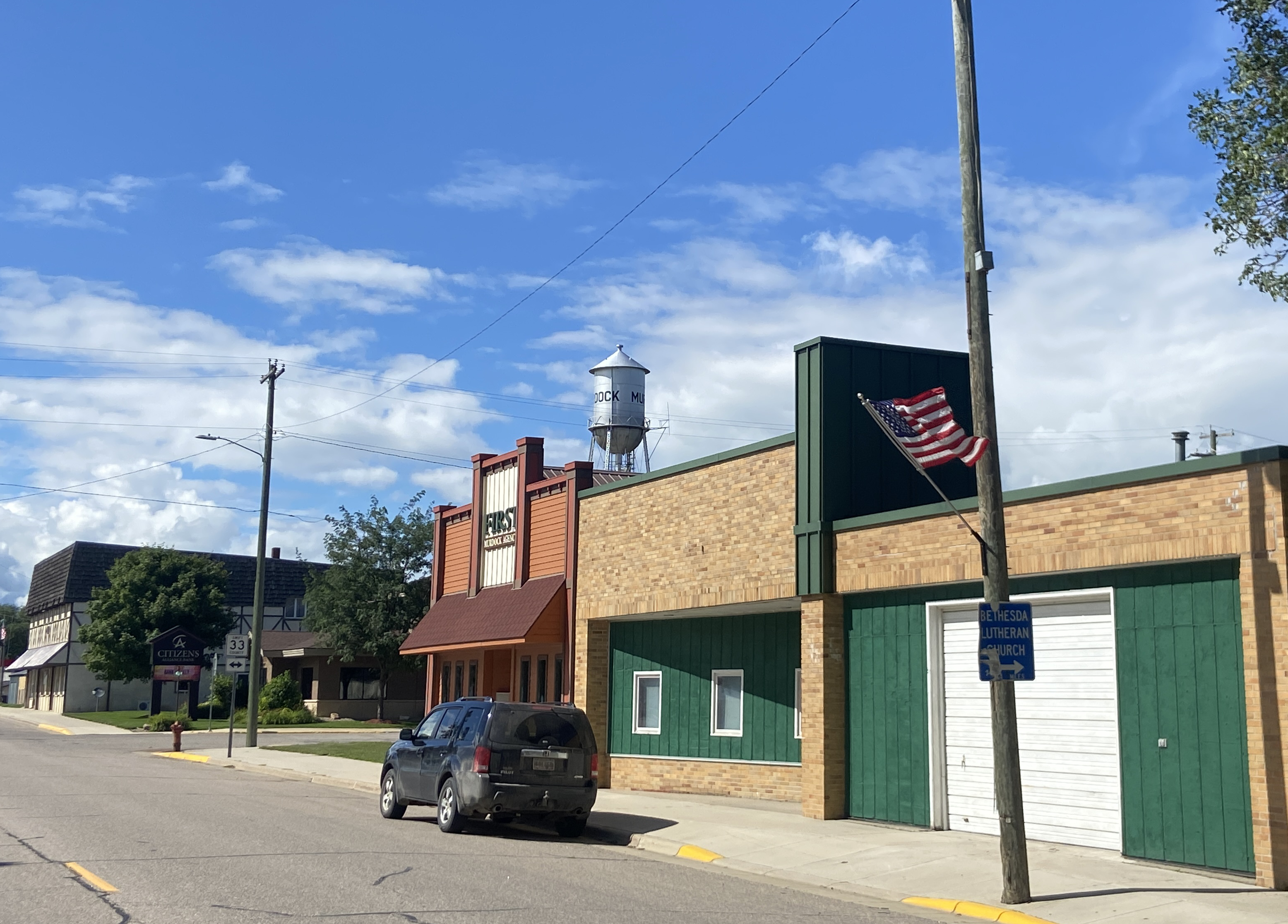
Business District Main Ave at Hollis Street, Murdock, Minnesota

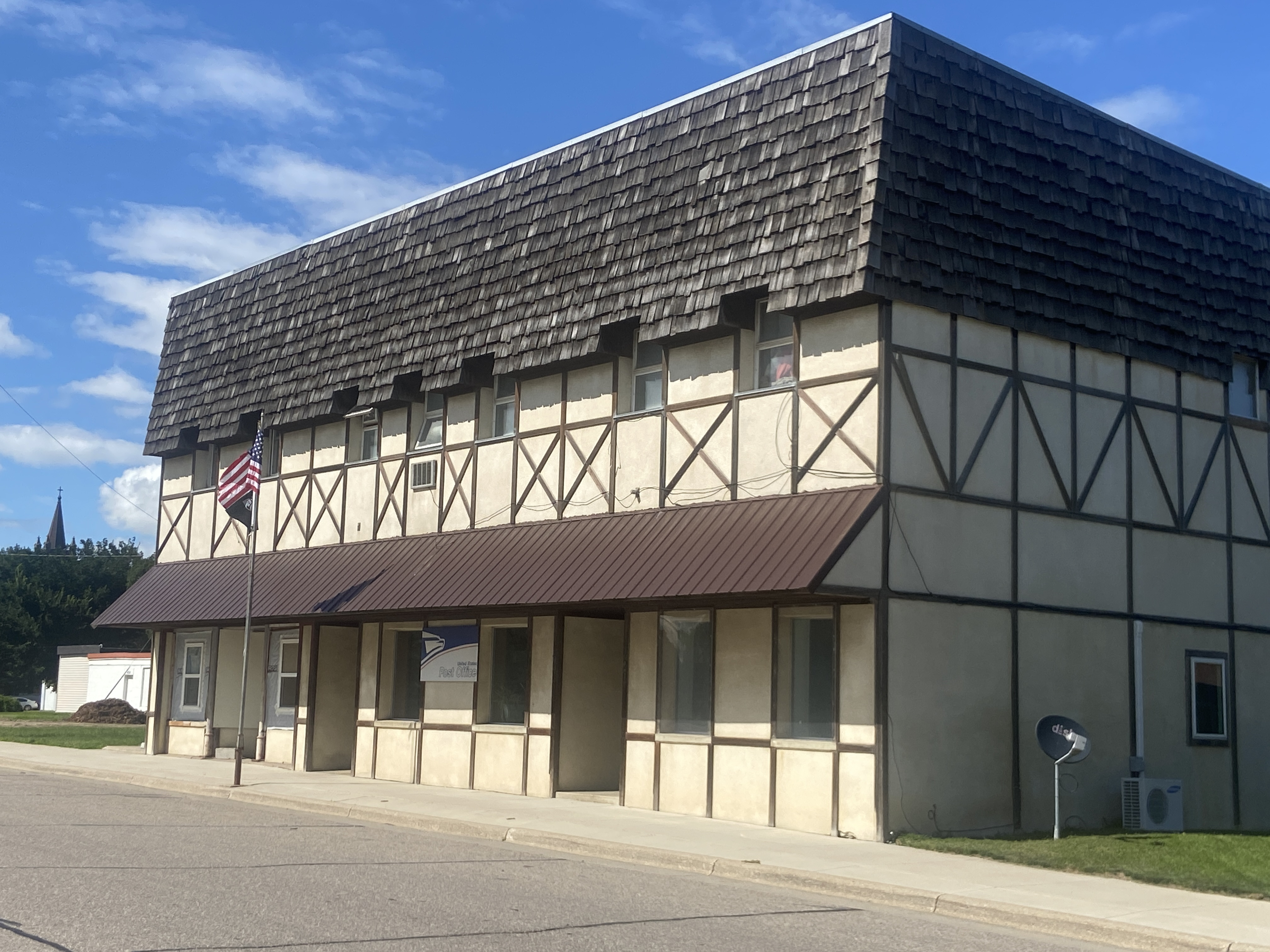
Post Office

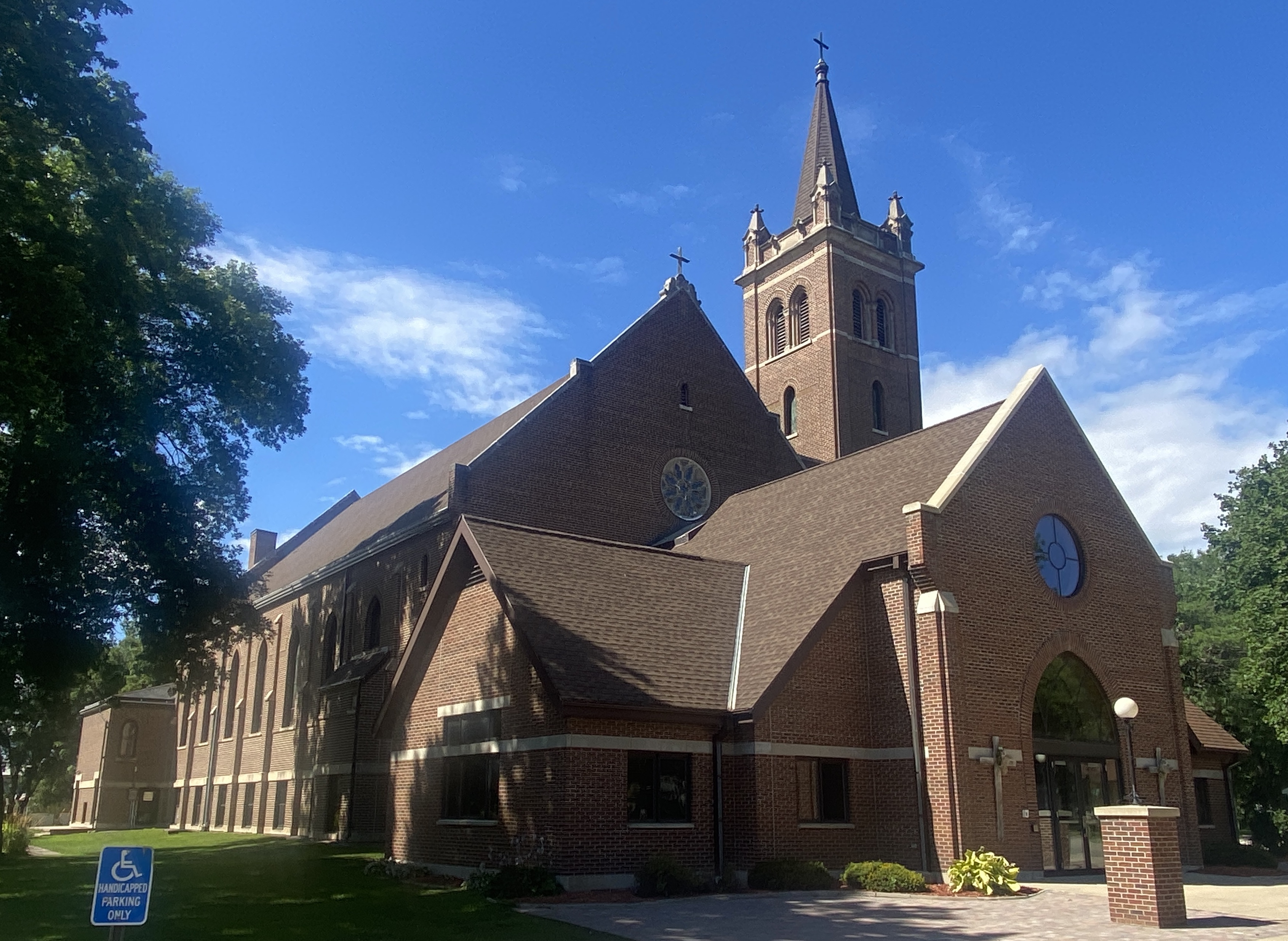
Sacred Heart Catholic Church

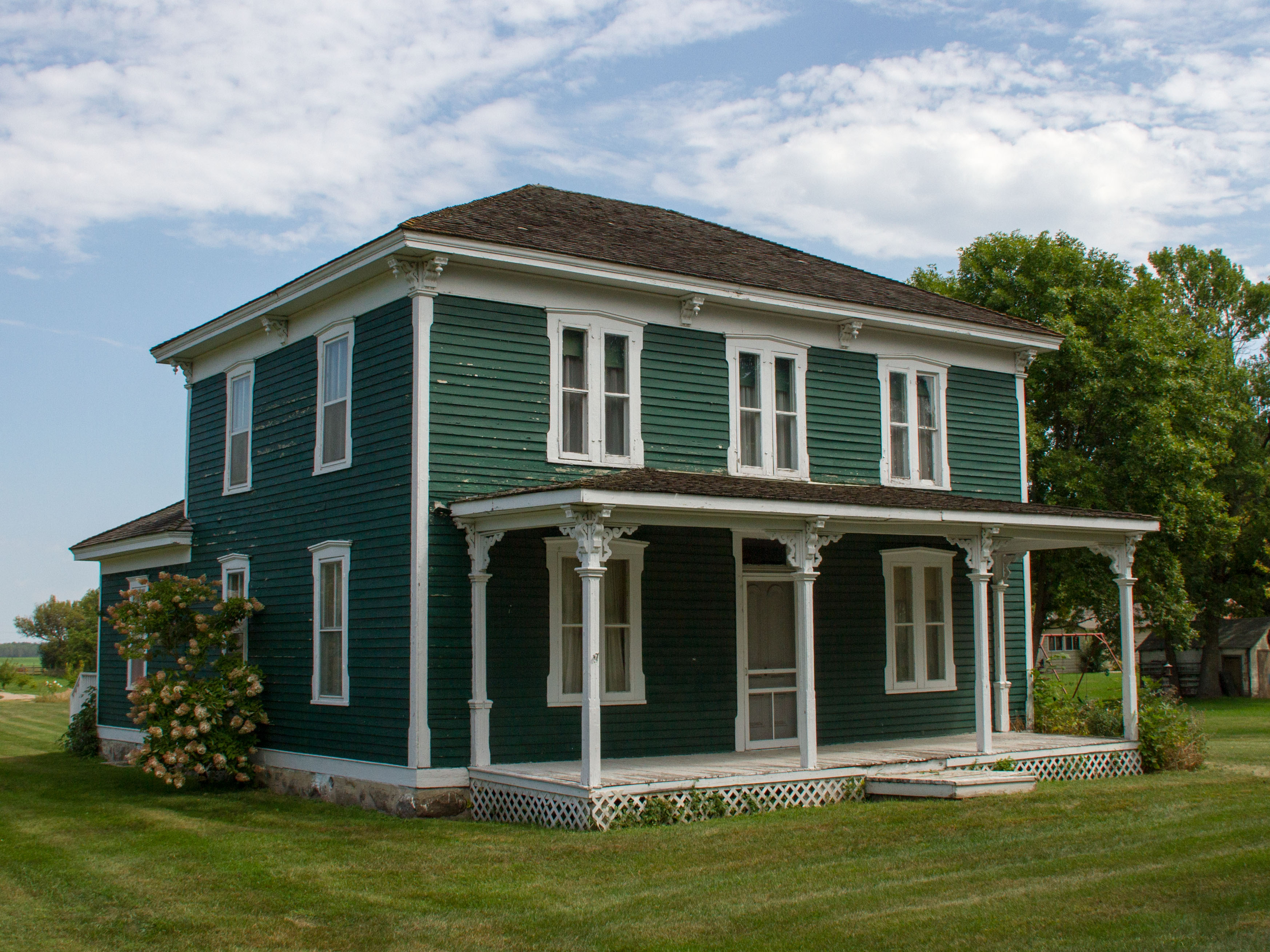
Sabin S. Murdock House, on the National Register of Historic Places.

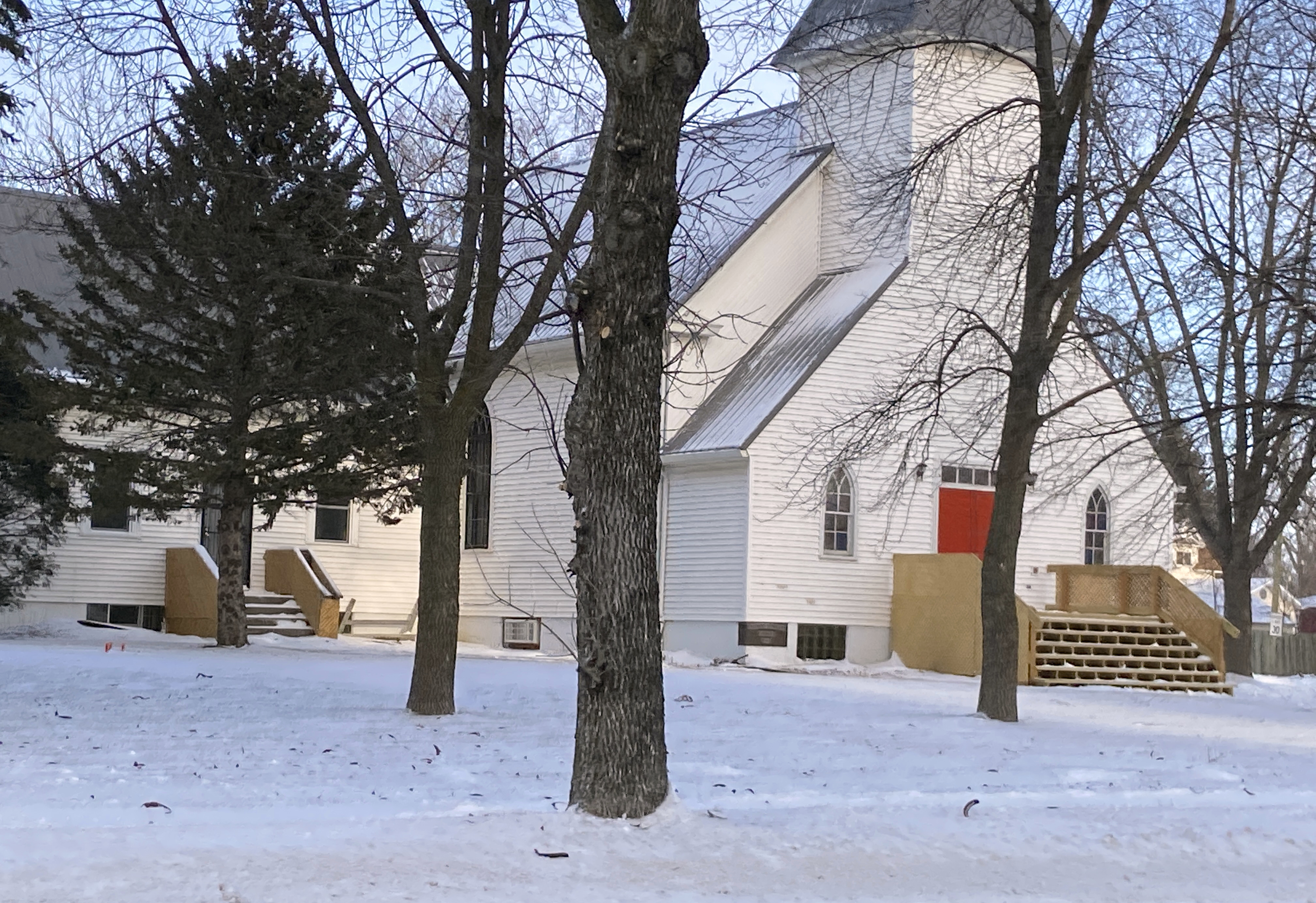
Former Calvary Lutheran Church, now neopagan Asatru Folk Assembly (AFA)
