= Howard Wads Rundquist =

American politician (1901–1985)

Howard Wads Rundquist (May 21, 1901 – February 28, 1985) was an American businessman and politician.

Rundquist was born in Murdock, Swift County, Minnesota and graduated from Murdock High School in 1919. He graduated from Gustavus Adolphus College in 1923 and went to the University of Minnesota for graduate studies. Rundquist also went to Fuller Theological Seminary for graduate studies. He lived in Dawson, Lac qui Parle, Minnesota, with his wife and family and was involved in the grocery business. Rundquist was also a high school teacher in the Lewiston and Willmar schools. Rundquist served in the Minnesota House of Representatives from 1943 to 1950. He died at Rice Memorial Hospital in Willmar, Minnesota. He was buried in Murdock, Minnesota after the funeral in Willmar, Minnesota.
