= Prairie Correctional Facility =

Closed prison in Appleton, Minnesota

- Interactive map of Prairie Correctional Facility
- Location: Appleton, Minnesota; 45.190°N 96.025°W
- Status: Closed
- Capacity: 1,600
- Population: 0 (2010)
- Closed: 2010
- Managed by: CoreCivic

The Prairie Correctional Facility is a 1,600-bed private prison in Appleton, Minnesota, United States, built by the city in 1991. It was sold in 1997 to CoreCivic and closed in 2010.

The private prison is projected to be used for immigrant detention in the fall or winter of 2026 as CoreCivic acquired a contract over more than $536 million for the next five years from U.S. Immigration and Customs Enforcement (ICE) in 2026.

== History ==
The prison was built by the city of Appleton, Minnesota and first opened, empty, in 1992. In March 1993 the city reached an agreement with the Puerto Rico Department of Corrections and Rehabilitation to fill all 516 beds. Through the years the prison was expanded twice, housed prisoners from Colorado, Idaho, Wisconsin, Hawaii, Washington, Minnesota and North Dakota, and was a significant local employer.

CoreCivic bought the facility in 1997, and closed the prison in 2010 following declining demand for the facility by the State of Minnesota, which had recently constructed four new 416-bed housing units at Minnesota Correctional Facility – Faribault and added 250 new beds to Minnesota Correctional Facility – Moose Lake.

The Prairie Correctional Facility was the only privately owned prison in the state of Minnesota. In 2023, HF1200 was introduced to the Minnesota Legislature, which would ban the Department of Corrections from housing prisoners in privately owned prisons. Supporters of the bill stated that the Prairie Correctional Facility is too far from a major hospital and the Twin Cities, where many of the inmates families would be visiting from. Opponents to the bill like State Senator Torrey Westrom (R) stated that opening the Prairie Correctional Facility would provide jobs to Swift County and reduce overcrowding in Minnesota prisons.

=== Immigrant detention ===
In August of 2025, CoreCivic began pursuing a contract with ICE to hold detained immigrants in the Prairie Correctional Facility. An ICE roadmap from July 2025 showed that the agency planned to expand to different parts of the country during President Trump's second term including the use of the Appleton facility. In October 2025, residents and faith leaders from across the state protested the plan. Residents of Appleton were divided on whether or not they wanted the ICE facility in their community.

During Operation Metro Surge, the widespread deployment of ICE agents in the Twin Cities and greater Minnesota, ICE detained more than 1000 people from Minnesota and surrounding states. ICE marked the Prairie Correctional Facility as a potential long-term facility in an Upper Midwestern detention and transportation network. ICE's Enforcement and Removal Operations forecast spending up to $50 million to gain a jail space in Minnesota to help develop a privately-run detainee transfer network.

On August 4, 2026, CoreCivic announced that a 5-year contract with ICE had been reached. The contract started August 11th and the facility will begin receiving detainees in the fall or winter. The contract is worth more than $536 million over five years creating $75 million in revenue per year for CoreCivic . The Department of Homeland Security purchased the facility for $495.6 million on August 5 while continuing to have it operated by CoreCivic.

KARE 11 reported that in 2025, CoreCivic had offered to sell the facility to the state of Minnesota of $75 million, while DHS paid $495.6 million in 2026, a difference in value of over $420 million. CoreCivic and its CEO were major donors to the second inauguration of Donald Trump and Trump-related PACs. Democratic congressional representatives, including Maggie Hassan, called for investigations into the sale and sent a letter to DHS requesting them to preserve all related records.
