= Church of St. Bridget =

Historic church in Minnesota, United States

- Church of St. Bridget-Catholic
- U.S. National Register of Historic Places
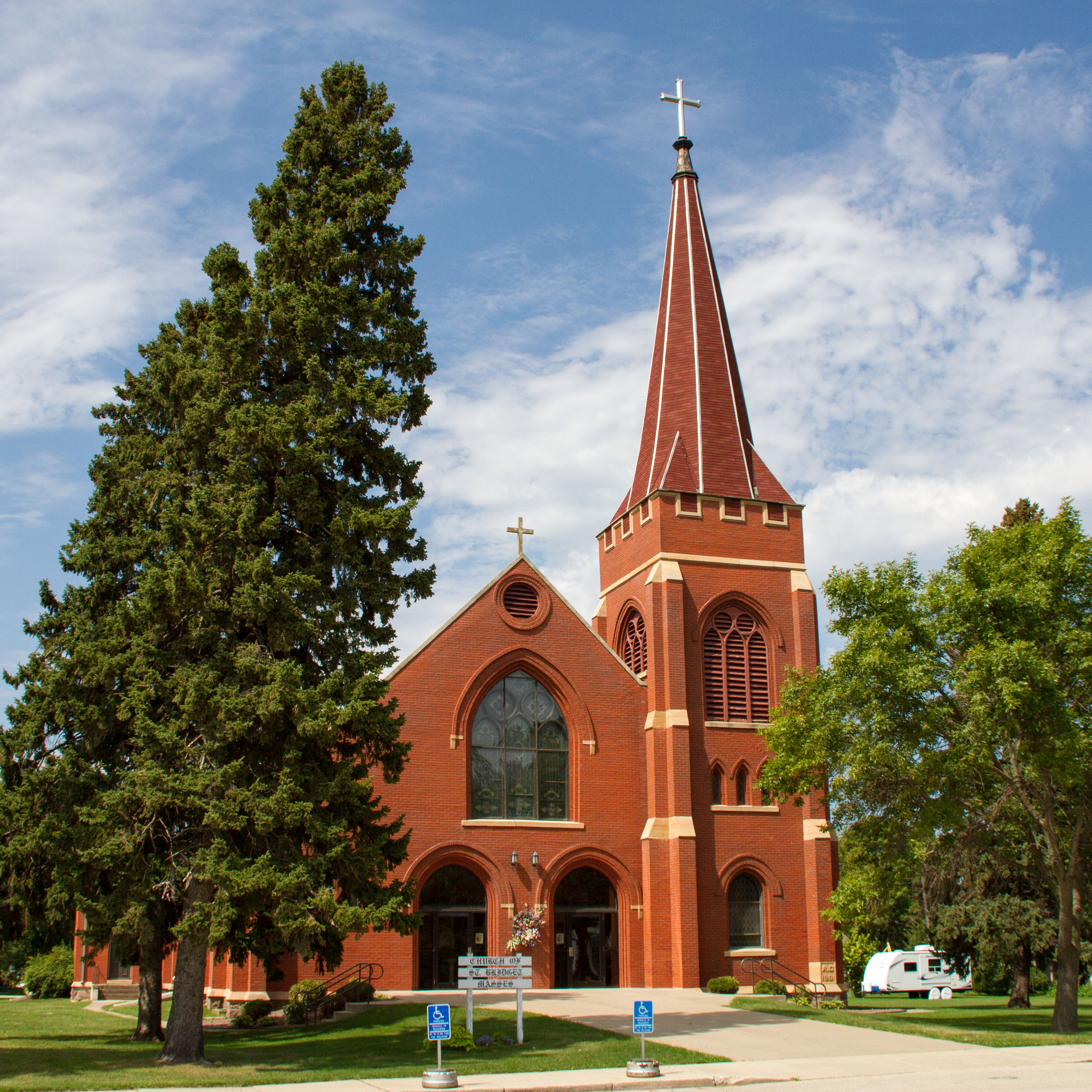
- The Church of St. Bridget from the southeast

- Location within Minnesota Location within the United States
- Location: 501 3rd Street South, De Graff, Minnesota
- Coordinates: 45°15′33″N 95°28′8″W
- Area: Less than one acre
- Built: 1901
- Built by: E.C. Richmond
- Architect: Edward J. Donahue
- Architectural style: Gothic Revival
- NRHP reference No.: 85001768
- Designated: August 15, 1985

The Church of St. Bridget is a Roman Catholic church in De Graff, Minnesota, United States. The parish, founded in 1876, was the first established in a major drive by Archbishop John Ireland to settle western Minnesota with Catholics. Its current building was constructed in 1901 and was listed on the National Register of Historic Places in 1985 for having local significance in the themes of architecture, community planning and development, exploration/settlement, and religion. It was nominated for its association with the beginning of Archbishop Ireland's colonization effort, the influence of the Catholic church on De Graff's development and population, and for being a rare outstate church building designed by Saint Paul architect Edward J. Donahue.

== Description ==
The Church of St. Bridget measures 115 feet (35 m) long and 50 feet (15 m) wide, with a 3 1/2-story bell tower. The foundation is made of granite from St. Cloud and the walls are red brick trimmed with Kasota limestone. The interior has exposed wooden beams, an ornate oak Gothic Revival altar, and large murals illustrating the Stations of the Cross.

== History ==
In the late 19th century, Archbishop John Ireland was organizing an effort to populate areas of western Minnesota, including Swift County and nearby counties, with Irish Catholics. De Graff was one of the settlements that he sponsored, along with Graceville, Clontarf, Currie, Minneota, Ghent, Iona, Avoca, and Fulda. The current Church of St. Bridget was designed in 1901 by Edward J. Donohue of Saint Paul, who designed other Catholic churches. The building was constructed by E.C. Richmond of Melrose.

== See also ==
- List of Catholic churches in the United States
- National Register of Historic Places listings in Swift County, Minnesota
