= Tim Miller (politician) =

American politician

Member of the Minnesota House of Representatives from the 17A district
- Incumbent
- Assumed office January 6, 2015
- Preceded by: Andrew Falk

Personal details
- Born: December 20, 1965 (age 60)
- Party: Republican Party of Minnesota
- Spouse: Cherie
- Children: 7
- Education: University of Iowa (B.S.)
- Occupation: Business Owner

Tim Miller (born December 20, 1965) is a Minnesota politician and member of the Minnesota House of Representatives. A member of the Republican Party of Minnesota, he represents District 17A in the west-central Minnesota.

== Early life and education ==
Miller was raised in Streamwood, Illinois. He attended the University of Iowa, graduating with a B.S.

== Minnesota House of Representatives ==
Miller was first elected to the Minnesota House of Representatives in 2014. In December 2018, Miller, along with three other House members, formed a separate 'New House Republican Caucus' out of dissatisfaction with the House minority leadership. Miller wrote a letter to his GOP colleagues stating that "the attitudes and actions by the HRC leader and some of his supporters have become too hostile toward me" and pledged to continue opposing "radical liberalism".

== Electoral history ==
2020 Minnesota State Representative- House 17A
Party	Candidate	Votes	%
Republican	Tim Miller (Incumbent)	13,272	64.3%
Democratic (DFL)	Ben Dolan	6,357	30.8%
Legal Marijuana Now	Ed Engelmann	1,007	4.9%
Write-in		4	0.0%

2018 Minnesota State Representative- House 17A
Party	Candidate	Votes	%
Republican	Tim Miller (Incumbent)	10,069	60.2%
Democratic (DFL)	Lyle Koenen	6,645	39.7%
Write-In		10	0.1%

2016 Minnesota State Representative- House 17A
Party	Candidate	Votes	%
Republican	Tim Miller (Incumbent)	11,603	59.01
Democratic (DFL)	Andrew Falk	8,045	40.91
Write-In		15	0.08%

2014 Minnesota State Representative- House 17A
Party	Candidate	Votes	%
Republican	Tim Miller	8,453	55.37
Democratic (DFL)	Andrew Falk (Incumbent)	6,789	44.47
Write-In		25	0.16%

== Personal life ==
Miller and his wife Cherie have seven children and reside in Prinsburg, Minnesota.
