= Chuck Brown (politician) =

American politician (1951–2003)

Member of the Minnesota House of Representatives from the 11A, 13A district
- In office January 8, 1985 – January 6, 1997
- Preceded by: Gary Findlay
- Succeeded by: Torrey Westrom

Personal details
- Born: April 3, 1951 Appleton, Minnesota, U.S.
- Died: August 14, 2003 (aged 52) Appleton, Minnesota, U.S.
- Party: Democratic Farmer Labor Party
- Spouse: Rebecca "Becky"
- Children: 4
- Education: Brown Institute; Southwest State University
- Occupation: auctioneer, politician

Charles Peter Brown (April 3, 1951 – August 14, 2003) was an American politician and member of the Minnesota House of Representatives from southwestern Minnesota. Narrowly elected in 1984, he was solidly re-elected in 1986 in the Democratic-Farmer-Labor Party's “firestorm” that swept through the region, giving Democrats unprecedented control of southwestern Minnesota for the next several election cycles. Re-elected again in 1988, 1990, 1992 and 1994, he serving six terms before retiring. He represented the old District 11A and, later, District 13A, which included all or portions of Big Stone, Douglas, Grant, Pope, Stevens, Swift and Traverse counties, changing somewhat through redistricting in 1990.

While in the legislature, Brown was a member of the House Agriculture, Appropriations, Capital Investment, Education, General Legislation & Veterans Affairs, Judiciary, Labor-Management Relations, Local Government & Metropolitan Affairs, Taxes, Transportation, and Ways & Means committees, and of various sub-committees relevant to each area. He chaired the Local Government & Metropolitan Affairs Committee during the 1993-94 Session.

From the town of Appleton, Brown was an auctioneer by trade. After leaving the legislature in 1997, he became a contract lobbyist for several groups, including the Tubman Family Alliance. Through his work for the Domestic Violence Legislative Alliance, he represented the interests of Tubman and numerous other service providers across Minnesota. He died unexpectedly in August 2003.
