= Christ Episcopal Church (Benson, Minnesota) =

Historic church in Minnesota, United States

- Christ Church-Episcopal
- U.S. National Register of Historic Places
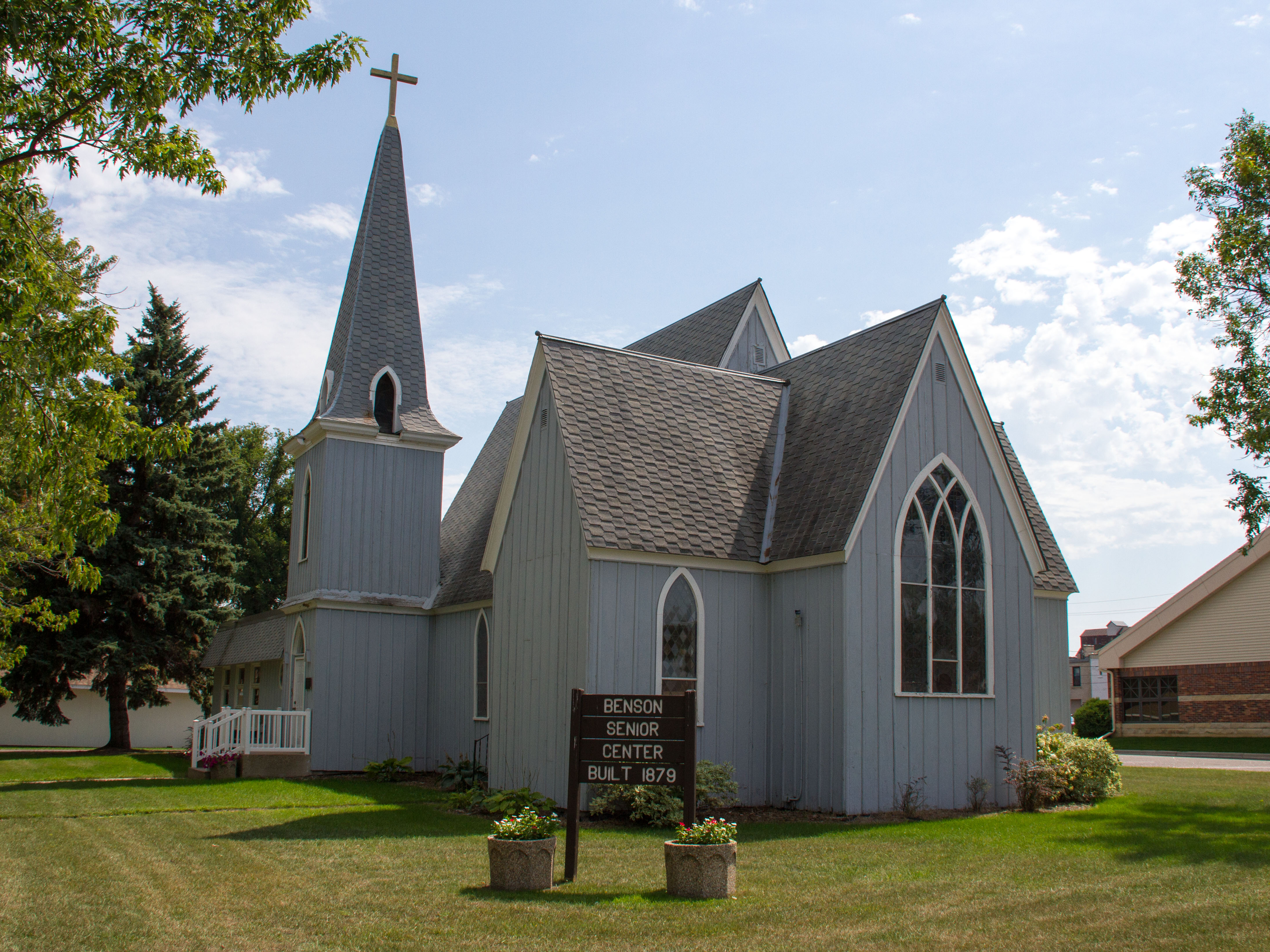
- Christ Episcopal Church from the northwest

- Location within Minnesota Location within the United States
- Location: 310 13th Street North, Benson, Minnesota
- Coordinates: 45°18′57″N 95°35′57″W
- Area: Less than one acre
- Built: 1879
- Architectural style: Carpenter Gothic
- NRHP reference No.: 85001761
- Designated: August 15, 1985

Christ Episcopal Church is a historic church building in Benson, Minnesota, United States. It is Benson's oldest church, built in 1879 as part of the Episcopal Church's ambitious expansion into western Minnesota under Bishop Henry Benjamin Whipple.

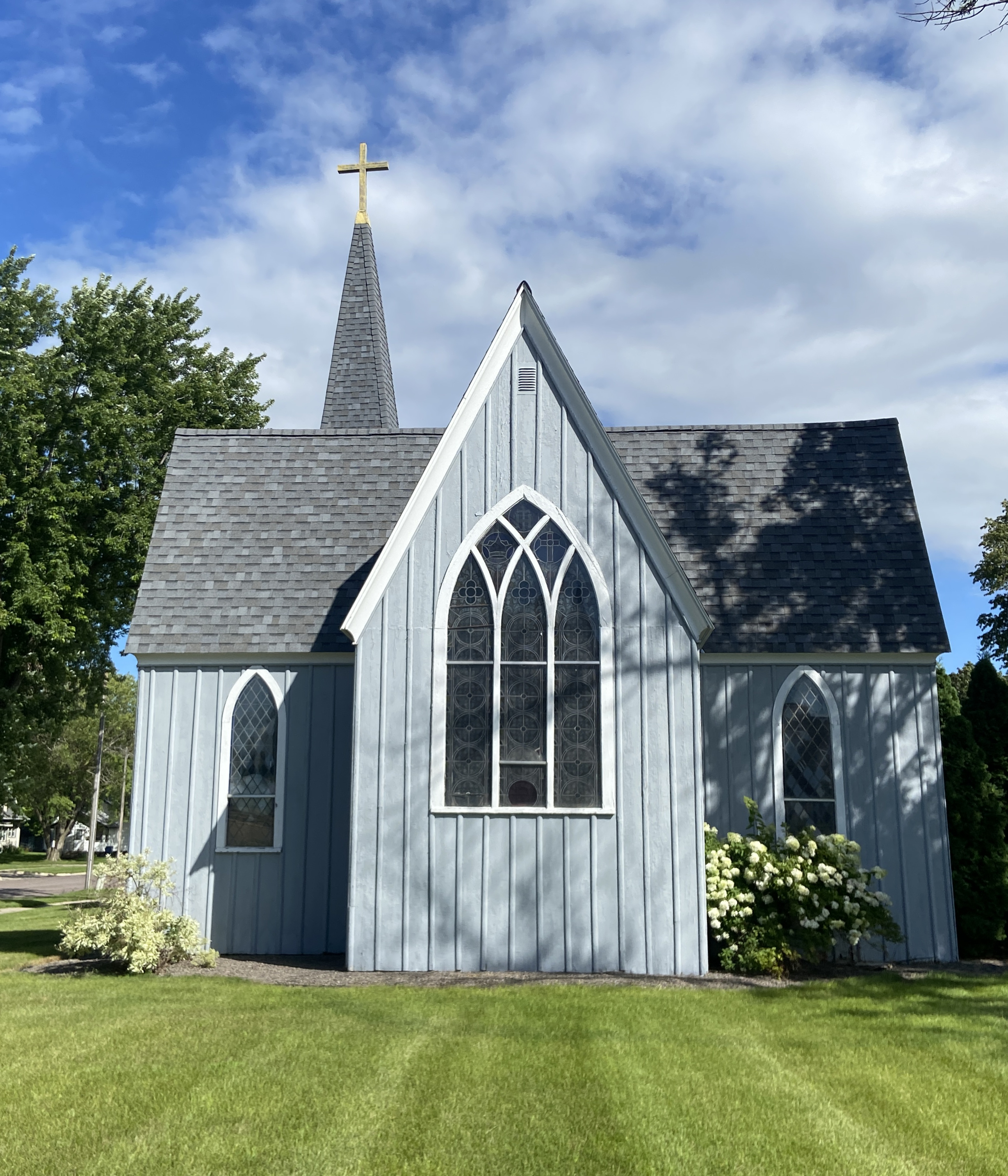
Back of church building

It was listed on the National Register of Historic Places in 1985 as Christ Church-Episcopal for having local significance in the themes of architecture and religion. It was nominated for its association with Bishop Whipple's missionary program, for symbolizing Benson's English and New Englander settlers, for being Benson's oldest church building, and for its early Gothic Revival architecture.

Its board and batten walls, side-entry bell tower, and lancet windows and door are all typical of Carpenter Gothic architecture. The congregation sold the building in 1966 to make way for construction of a high-rise apartment. The 87-year-old church building escaped demolition; it was moved south across the road (at which point it was rotated 180° to maintain its street-facing façade). It was repurposed as a senior center and currently houses the Swift County Drop-In Center.

== See also ==
- List of Anglican churches
- National Register of Historic Places listings in Swift County, Minnesota
