= Gethsemane Episcopal Church (Appleton, Minnesota) =

Historic church in Minnesota, United States

- U.S. National Register of Historic Places
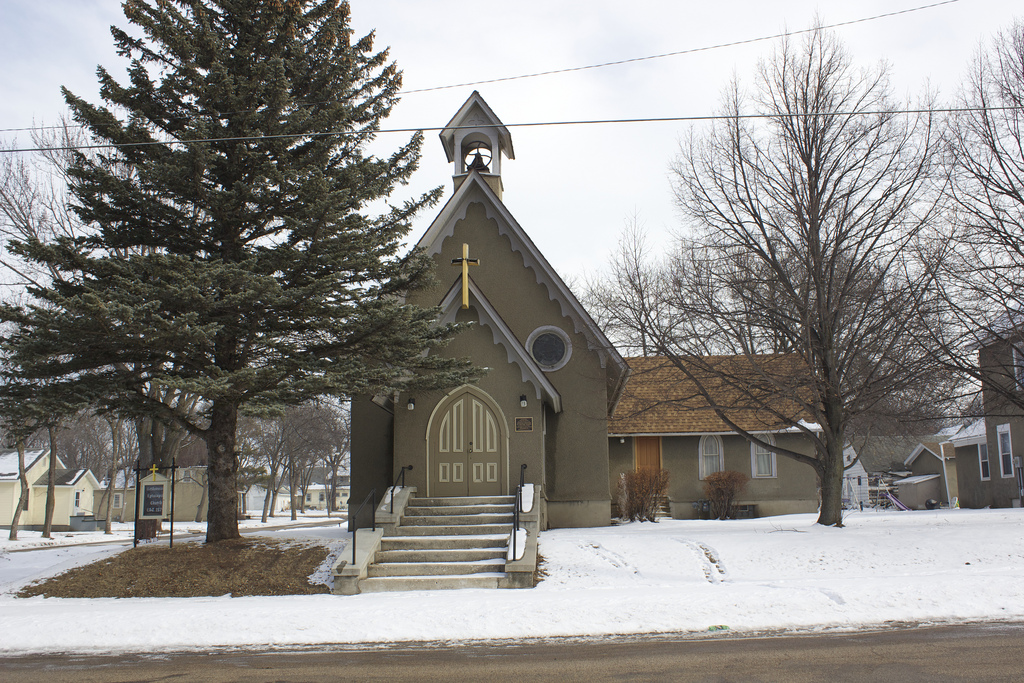
- The Gethsemane Episcopal Church from the west

- Location within Minnesota Location within the United States
- Location: 40 North Hering Street, Appleton, Minnesota
- Coordinates: 45°12′2.6″N 96°1′2″W
- Area: Less than one acre
- Built: 1879
- Architectural style: Gothic Revival
- NRHP reference No.: 11000469
- Designated: July 20, 2011

Gethsemane Episcopal Church is a historic Episcopal church building in Appleton, Minnesota, United States. It was built in 1879 during the episcopate of pioneer Bishop Henry Benjamin Whipple. It was originally a wooden-frame structure with the board and batten walls and lancet windows typical of Carpenter Gothic style. Around 1920 the interior and exterior walls were plastered over, which greatly changed its appearance and obscured its Carpenter Gothic origin. Over the years additions were made to the building and a basement was added.

The church was listed on the National Register of Historic Places in 2011 for its local significance in the theme of religion. It was nominated for representing the westernmost expansion of the Episcopal church in southern Minnesota under Bishop Whipple.

Gethsemane Episcopal Church ceased to be an active parish in 1991, but it is still owned by the Episcopal Diocese of Minnesota and is occasionally used for funerals and other services.

== See also ==
- List of Anglican churches
- National Register of Historic Places listings in Swift County, Minnesota
