= Andrew Falk =

American politician

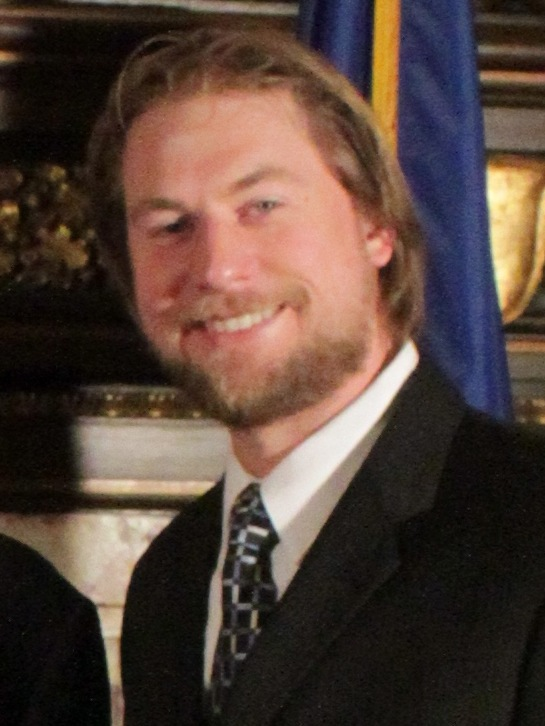

Member of the Minnesota House of Representatives from the 17A district 20A (2009–2013)
- In office January 6, 2009 – January 5, 2015
- Preceded by: Aaron Peterson
- Succeeded by: Tim Miller

Personal details
- Born: April 1983 (age 43) Murdock, Minnesota
- Party: Minnesota Democratic–Farmer–Labor Party
- Spouse: Marnie Moore
- Education: University of Minnesota
- Occupation: farmer, renewable energy developer

Andrew J. Falk (born April 1983) is a Minnesota politician and former member of the Minnesota House of Representatives. A member of the Minnesota Democratic–Farmer–Labor Party (DFL), he represented District 17A, which included all or portions of Chippewa, Kandiyohi, Renville, Swift counties in southwestern Minnesota. He is also a fifth generation farmer and renewable energy developer.

== Early life, education, and career ==
Falk graduated from the Kerkhoven-Murdock-Sunburg Public School System, then went on to the University of Minnesota's Carlson School of Management in Minneapolis, earning his bachelor's degree in Entrepreneurial Management and Finance. He is a soybean and seed processing farmer, and is the co-founder of Knight Energy LLC, a wind-power company.

== Minnesota House of Representatives ==
Falk was first elected in 2008, opting to run after Rep. Aaron Peterson decided not to seek re-election. He was re-elected in 2010 and 2012. He lost re-election in 2014 and sought election to his old seat again in 2016, losing both times to Republican Tim Miller.
