= Sabin S. Murdock House =

Historic house in Minnesota, United States

- Formerly listed on the U.S. National Register of Historic Places
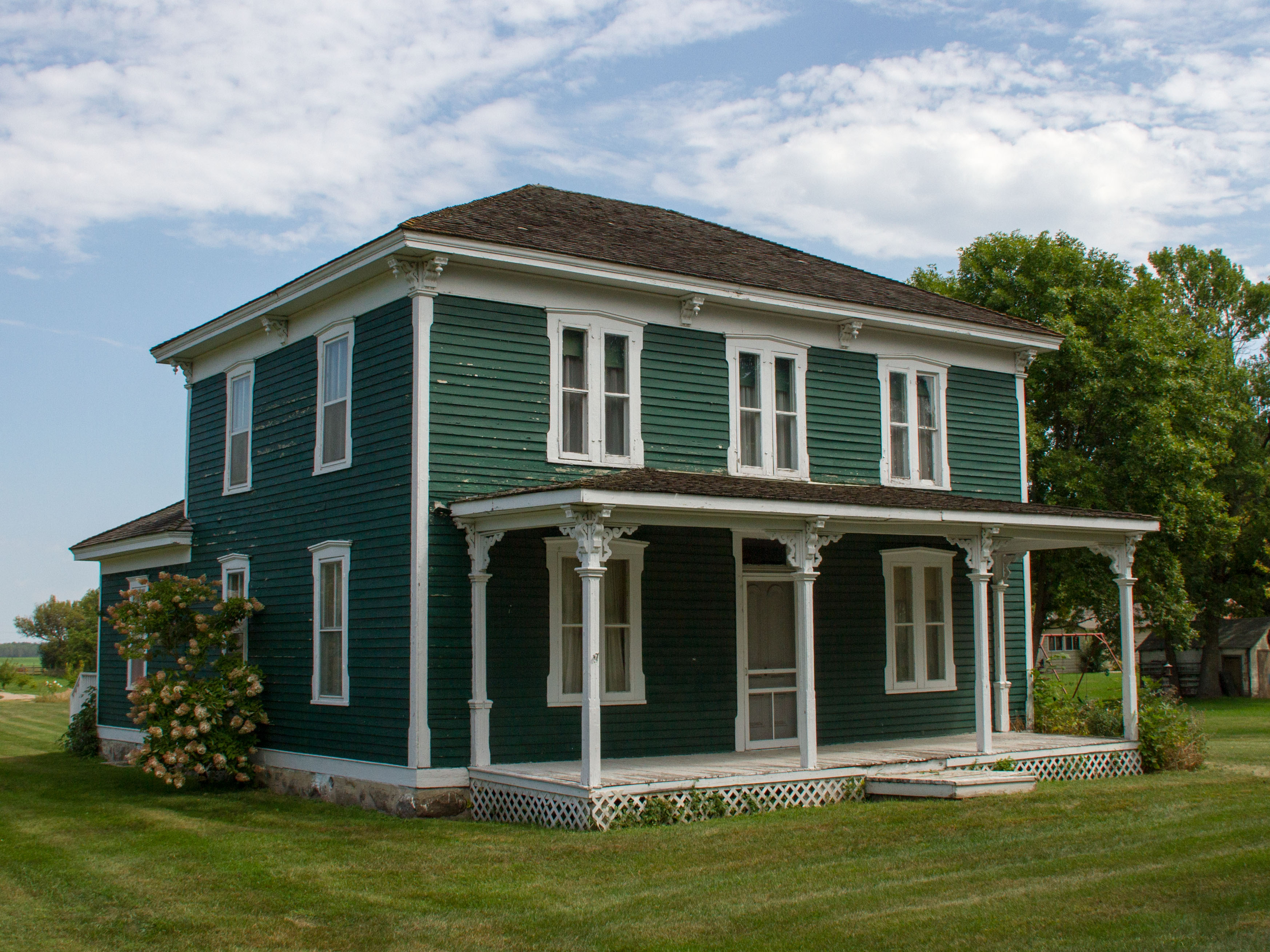
- The Sabin S. Murdock House from the west

- Location within Minnesota Location within the United States
- Location: Clara Avenue, Murdock, Minnesota
- Coordinates: 45°13′26.3″N 95°23′25.8″W
- Area: Less than one acre
- Built: 1878
- Architect: Sabin S. Murdock
- Architectural style: Carpenter Gothic/Italianate
- NRHP reference No.: 85001752

Significant dates
- Added to NRHP: August 15, 1985
- Removed from NRHP: May 7, 2026

The Sabin S. Murdock House was a historic house in Murdock, Minnesota, United States. It was built in 1878 for Sabin S. Murdock (1830–1900), who almost singlehandedly founded and promoted the community he named after himself. The house was listed on the National Register of Historic Places in 1985 for its local significance in the themes of architecture, European ethnic heritage, and exploration/settlement. It was nominated for being West-central Minnesota's most prominent house of a single individual who established and promoted a rural townsite, and for being the oldest and most architecturally significant Victorian house in Murdock.

The house fell into disrepair and was scheduled to be demolished in May 2025 after an unsuccessful effort to find a buyer for it.

== See also ==
- National Register of Historic Places listings in Swift County, Minnesota
