= De Graff, Minnesota =

City in Minnesota, United States

- City
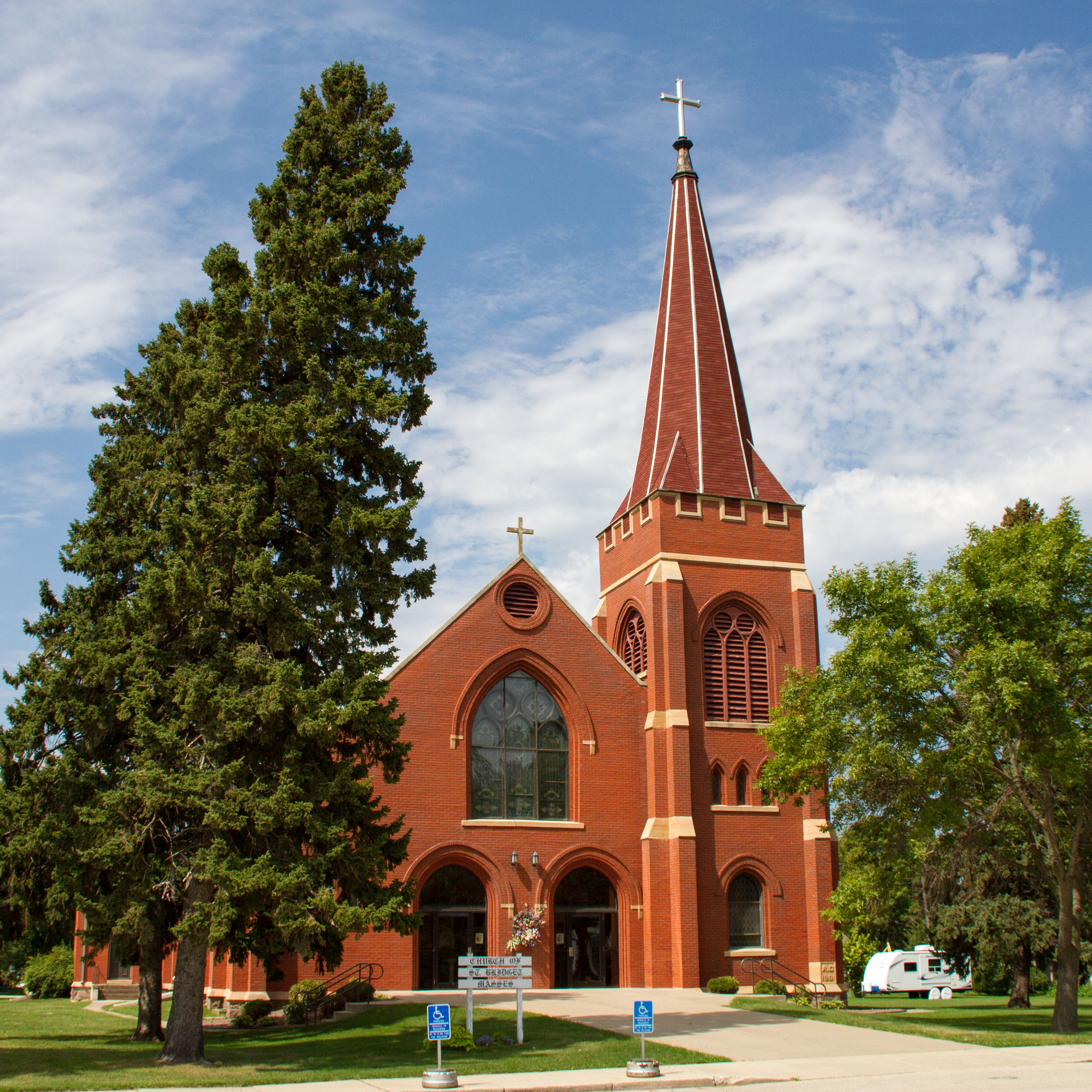
- The Church of St. Bridget is on the National Register of Historic Places

- Location in Minnesota
- Coordinates: 45°15′36″N 95°28′06″W
- Country: United States
- State: Minnesota
- County: Swift
- Founded: 1875
- Incorporated: February 10, 1881

Government
  - Mayor: Randy Simmonds

Area
  - Total: 0.826 sq mi (2.139 km^{2})
  - Land: 0.826 sq mi (2.139 km^{2})
  - Water: 0 sq mi (0.000 km^{2})
- Elevation: 1,056 ft (322 m)

Population (2020)
  - Total: 110
  - Estimate (2022): 111
  - Density: 131.5/sq mi (50.76/km^{2})
- Time zone: UTC−6 (Central (CST))
  - Summer (DST): UTC−5 (CDT)
- ZIP Code: 56271
- Area code: 320
- FIPS code: 27-15418
- GNIS feature ID: 2394473
- Sales tax: 6.875%

De Graff is a city in Swift County, Minnesota, United States. The population was 110 at the 2020 census.

== History ==
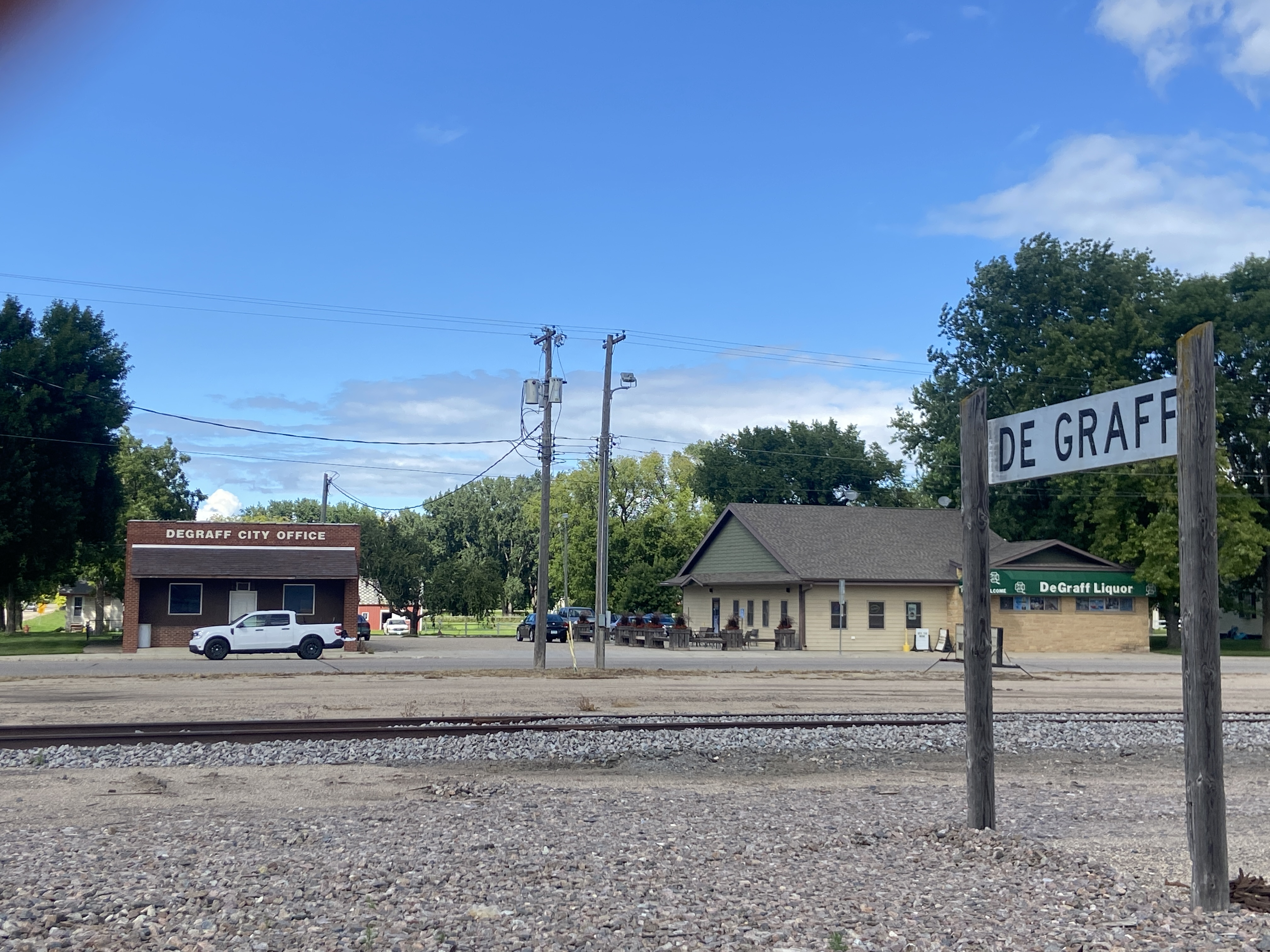
City Office in background past track

De Graff was laid out in 1875, and named for Andrew De Graff, a railroad agent. A post office was established at De Graff in 1873, and remained in operation until 1996. De Graff was incorporated in 1881.

== Geography ==
According to the United States Census Bureau, the city has a total area of 0.826 square miles (2.14 km^{2}), all land.

U.S. Route 12 serves as a main route in the community.

== Demographics ==
Historical population
Census	Pop.	Note	%±
1900	165		—
1910	215		30.3%
1920	246		14.4%
1930	274		11.4%
1940	291		6.2%
1950	270		−7.2%
1960	196		−27.4%
1970	195		−0.5%
1980	179		−8.2%
1990	149		−16.8%
2000	133		−10.7%
2010	115		−13.5%
2020	110		−4.3%
2022 (est.)	111		0.9%
U.S. Decennial Census; 2020 Census

=== 2010 census ===
As of the 2010 census, there were 115 people, 53 households, and 34 families residing in the city. The population density was 142.0 inhabitants per square mile (54.8/km^{2}). There were 67 housing units at an average density of 82.7 per square mile (31.9/km^{2}). The racial makeup of the city was 94.8% White, 4.3% African American, and 0.9% from two or more races.

There were 53 households, of which 26.4% had children under the age of 18 living with them, 54.7% were married couples living together, 5.7% had a female householder with no husband present, 3.8% had a male householder with no wife present, and 35.8% were non-families. 34.0% of all households were made up of individuals, and 17% had someone living alone who was 65 years of age or older. The average household size was 2.17 and the average family size was 2.71.

The median age in the city was 45.3 years. 15.7% of residents were under the age of 18; 10.4% were between the ages of 18 and 24; 23.4% were from 25 to 44; 40.1% were from 45 to 64; and 10.4% were 65 years of age or older. The gender makeup of the city was 53.9% male and 46.1% female.

=== 2000 census ===
As of the 2000 census, there were 133 people, 60 households, and 31 families residing in the city. The population density was 164.8 inhabitants per square mile (63.6/km^{2}). There were 67 housing units at an average density of 83.0 per square mile (32.0/km^{2}). The racial makeup of the city was 99.25% White, and 0.75% from two or more races. Hispanic or Latino of any race were 2.26% of the population.

There were 60 households, out of which 28.3% had children under the age of 18 living with them, 43.3% were married couples living together, 5.0% had a female householder with no husband present, and 46.7% were non-families. 43.3% of all households were made up of individuals, and 21.7% had someone living alone who was 65 years of age or older. The average household size was 2.22 and the average family size was 3.13.

In the city, the population was spread out, with 29.3% under the age of 18, 5.3% from 18 to 24, 30.1% from 25 to 44, 21.1% from 45 to 64, and 14.3% who were 65 years of age or older. The median age was 36 years. For every 100 females, there were 107.8 males. For every 100 females age 18 and over, there were 108.9 males.

The median income for a household in the city was $38,000, and the median income for a family was $40,625. Males had a median income of $29,286 versus $22,813 for females. The per capita income for the city was $14,987. There were 9.8% of families and 9.7% of the population living below the poverty line, including 3.4% of under eighteens and 18.2% of those over 64.
