= Benson Township, Swift County, Minnesota =

Benson Township, Minnesota
- Township
- Location within the state of Minnesota Benson Township, Minnesota (the United States)
- Coordinates: 45°21′39″N 95°34′44″W
- Country: United States
- State: Minnesota
- County: Swift

Area
  - Total: 36.0 sq mi (93.2 km^{2})
  - Land: 34.3 sq mi (88.8 km^{2})
  - Water: 1.7 sq mi (4.3 km^{2})
- Elevation: 1,047 ft (319 m)

Population (2000)
  - Total: 367
  - Density: 11/sq mi (4.1/km^{2})
- Time zone: UTC-6 (Central (CST))
  - Summer (DST): UTC-5 (CDT)
- ZIP code: 56215
- Area code: 320
- FIPS code: 27-05230
- GNIS feature ID: 0663570

Benson Township is a township in Swift County, Minnesota, United States. The population was 367 at the 2000 census.

== Geography ==
According to the United States Census Bureau, the township has a total area of 36.0 square miles (93 km^{2}), of which 34.3 square miles (89 km^{2}) is land and 1.7 square miles (4.4 km^{2}) (4.64%) is water.

== Demographics ==
As of the census of 2000, there were 367 people, 121 households, and 102 families residing in the township. The population density was 10.7 inhabitants per square mile (4.1/km^{2}). There were 128 housing units at an average density of 3.7 per square mile (1.4/km^{2}). The racial makeup of the township was 97.82% White, 0.27% Asian, 1.91% from other races. Hispanic or Latino of any race were 4.09% of the population.

There were 121 households, out of which 38.0% had children under the age of 18 living with them, 79.3% were married couples living together, 4.1% had a female householder with no husband present, and 15.7% were non-families. 11.6% of all households were made up of individuals, and 5.8% had someone living alone who was 65 years of age or older. The average household size was 2.96 and the average family size was 3.23.

In the township the population was spread out, with 32.4% under the age of 18, 4.1% from 18 to 24, 27.0% from 25 to 44, 19.9% from 45 to 64, and 16.6% who were 65 years of age or older. The median age was 37 years. For every 100 females, there were 112.1 males. For every 100 females age 18 and over, there were 100.0 males.

The median income for a household in the township was $47,143, and the median income for a family was $49,107. Males had a median income of $32,813 versus $17,188 for females. The per capita income for the township was $16,446. About 5.3% of families and 4.1% of the population were below the poverty line, including none of those under age 18 and 7.4% of those age 65 or over.
