= Appleton, Minnesota =

City in Minnesota, United States

- City
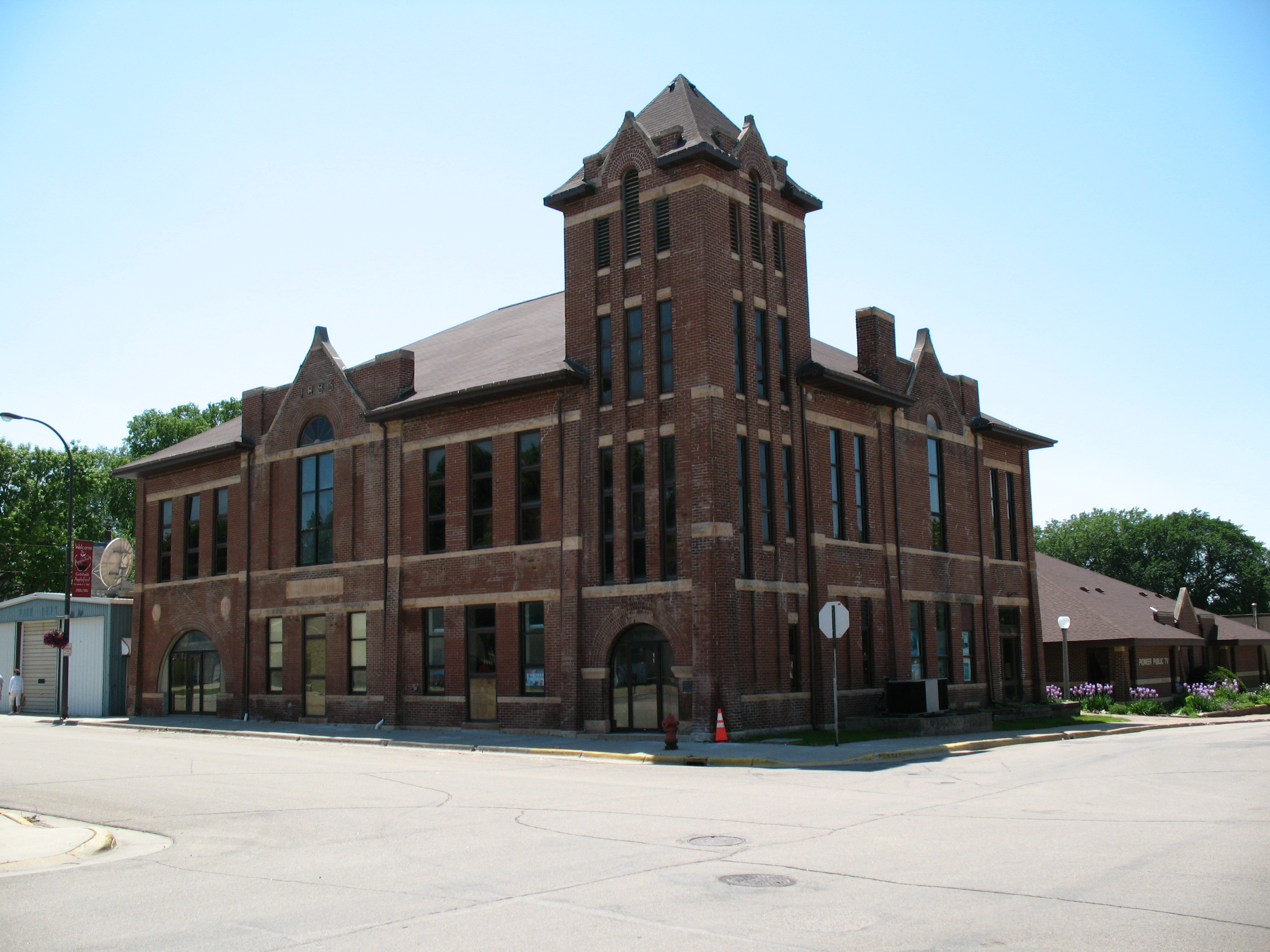
- Appleton's Old City Hall
- Nickname: "Home of Honored Veterans"
- Location of Appleton within Swift County, Minnesota
- Coordinates: 45°11′59″N 96°01′21″W
- Country: United States
- State: Minnesota
- County: Swift

Area
  - Total: 1.92 sq mi (4.98 km^{2})
  - Land: 1.87 sq mi (4.84 km^{2})
  - Water: 0.054 sq mi (0.14 km^{2})
- Elevation: 1,007 ft (307 m)

Population (2020)
  - Total: 1,392
  - Density: 744.2/sq mi (287.34/km^{2})
- Time zone: UTC-6 (Central (CST))
  - Summer (DST): UTC-5 (CDT)
- ZIP code: 56208
- Area code: 320
- FIPS code: 27-01864
- GNIS feature ID: 2393968
- Website: https://appletonmn.gov/

Appleton is a small city in Swift County, Minnesota, United States. Its population was 1,392 at the 2020 census. The town has a high unemployment rate, lower household incomes, and higher number of families living in poverty. It is home to a vacant medium-security prison, the Prairie Correctional Facility, which is wholly owned and operated by Corrections Corporation of America. Appleton also includes a plant-protein factory operated by Eat Just, Inc.

Elmer A. Benson, who served as a United States Senator and as governor of Minnesota, was born in Appleton on September 22, 1895. All of its twenty-odd streets, except Minnesota Street, are named for local veterans who died in combat.

== History ==
Appleton was laid out in 1872, and named after the founder ´s birthplace in Appleton, Wisconsin. A post office has been in operation at Appleton since 1873. A flour mill on the banks of the Pomme de Terre River was in operation from 1872 until the late 1960’s. The Hastings and Dakota Railroad (out of Milwaukee, WI) was extended from Benson, Minnesota to Appleton in 1872. Appleton was incorporated in 1881. Gethsemane Episcopal Church, on North Hering Street at Snelling Avenue, was built in 1879 like Appleton City Hall and was listed on the National Register of Historic Places in 2011.

In 1946, then Appleton Mayor Robert P. Miller noticed that the number of WWII fatalities was the same as Appleton´s number of streets, so the streets were named after vetereans and became a living memorial. To date, Appleton is the only town in the U.S., where all its streets and avenues are named for its fallen soldiers.

In 1991, the city built a prison and in 1993 accepted prisoners not only from Minnesota, but neighboring Wisconsin, and the West Coast including Idaho, Washington, and even Hawaii. The Prairie Correctional Facility closed after only 5 years in 1996. A private company, Corrections Corporation of America (CCA), bought the 1600 bed facility and ran it until 2010, again closing it for low demand. According to the 2018 Appleton Comprehensive Plan Task Force it had a positive economic impact on businesses in the community.

== Geography ==
According to the United States Census Bureau, the city has a total area of 2.04 sq mi (5.28 km^{2}); 1.97 square miles (5.10 km^{2}) are land and 0.07 square miles (0.18 km^{2}) is covered by water. The Pomme de Terre River flows through the city and continues 10 miles to the west and south into Marsh Lake on the Minnesota River.

U.S. Highway 59 and Minnesota State Highways 7 and 119 are the main routes in the city. It has two railroad spurs namely BNSF and TC&W.

== Demographics ==
Historical population
Census	Pop.	Note	%±
1880	400		—
1890	994		148.5%
1900	1,184		19.1%
1910	1,221		3.1%
1920	1,579		29.3%
1930	1,625		2.9%
1940	1,877		15.5%
1950	2,256		20.2%
1960	2,172		−3.7%
1970	1,789		−17.6%
1980	1,842		3.0%
1990	1,552		−15.7%
2000	2,871		85.0%
2010	1,412		−50.8%
2020	1,392		−1.4%
U.S. Decennial Census

=== 2010 census ===
As of the census of 2010, 1,412 people, 677 households, and 342 families were living in the city. The population density was 716.8 inhabitants per square mile (276.8/km^{2}). The 851 housing units averaged 432.0/sq mi (166.8/km^{2}). The racial makeup of the city was 92.8% White, 1.3% African American, 1.1% Native American, 0.5% Asian, 0.1% Pacific Islander, 2.3% from other races, and 1.8% from two or more races. Hispanics or Latinos of any race were 4.2% of the population.

Of the 677 households, 22.3% had children under 18 living with them, 35.6% were married couples living together, 10.8% had a female householder with no husband present, 4.1% had a male householder with no wife present, and 49.5% were not families. About 44.9% of all households were made up of individuals, and 24.8% had someone living alone who was 65 or older. The average household size was 2.00, and the average family size was 2.78.

The median age in the city was 48.5 years; 20% of residents were under the age of 18; 6.5% were between 18 and 24; 20% were from 25 to 44; 26.2% were from 45 to 64; and 27.5% were 65 or older. The gender makeup of the city was 46.6% male and 53.4% female.

=== 2000 census ===
As of the census of 2000, 2,871 people, 729 households, and 376 families were living in the city. The population density was 1,442.2 inhabitants per square mile (556.8/km^{2}). The racial makeup of the city was 68.13% White, 10.73% African American, 1.57% Native American, 5.02% Asian, 6.27% Pacific Islander, 2.40% from other races, and 5.89% from two or more races. Hispanics or Latinos of any race were 4.84% of the population. Totals include about 1,000 inmates in the prison.

Of the 729 households, 23.5% had children under the age of 18 living with them, 40.1% were married couples living together, 8.6% had a female householder with no husband present, and 48.4% were not families. About 45.5% of all households were made up of individuals, and 27.4% had someone living alone who was 65 years of age or older. The average household size was 2.02, and the average family size was 2.82.

In the city, the age distribution was 12.1% under 18, 9.2% from 18 to 24, 42.7% from 25 to 44, 19.9% from 45 to 64, and 16.2% who were 65 or older. The median age was 39 years. For every 100 females, there were 240.6 males. For every 100 females age 18 and over, there were 266.9 males.

The median income for a household in the city was $25,950, and for a family was $40,313. Males had a median income of $26,991 versus $20,991 for females. The per capita income for the city was $12,429. About 9.9% of families and 14.7% of the population were below the poverty line, including 14.9% of those under age 18 and 23.2% of those age 65 or over.

== Education ==
Appleton Public Schools are part of the Lac qui Parle Valley School District. Schools in the district include MMN Elementary School, Appleton Elementary School, LqPV Middle School and Lac qui Parle Valley High School.

Appleton Elementary School is located in Appleton.

== Administration and politics ==
As of 2026, the City Administrator was John Olinger.

== Media ==
=== Newspaper ===
The Appleton Press provides local news.

=== Television stations ===
Appleton did have one full-service television station, PBS member station KWCM-TV. Pioneer Public TV moved from Appleton to Granite Falls in 2016. Appleton is also home to several low-power free-to-air and pay TV stations that show programming normally seen on cable television. While this phenomenon is fairly common in Canada, it is unusual in the United States. These stations are licensed to Appleton:

Free-to-air stations:

- KWCM-TV analog 10/digital 31 (PBS)
- K56BZ analog 56 - KARE via K50AG (NBC)
- K58EO analog 58 - WFTC (MyNetworkTV)

Defunct TV stations:

- K15DC analog 15 - A&E
- K17CS analog 17 - TBS (not WTBS)
- K19CW analog 19 - USA Network
- K21AK analog 21 - Nickelodeon (owned by Teleview Systems of Minnesota, Inc.)
- K23DF analog 23 - Discovery Channel
- K29CC analog 29 - ABC Family
- K31BT - (formerly CNN, shut down for KWCM-DT's signal)
- K33CR - (formerly Showtime)
- K49ED analog 49 - TNT
- K52AH analog 52 - Spike TV (formerly TNN)
- K54AK - KMSP-TV (Fox)
- K60AB - (formerly FSN North)

== Notable people ==
- Elmer Austin Benson (September 22, 1895 – March 13, 1985) was an American lawyer and politician from Appleton, Minnesota. In 1935, Elmer Benson was appointed to the U.S. Senate following the death of Thomas Schall and in 1936 he was elected as Governor of Minnesota (1937 – 1939).
- Charles Peter “Chuck” Brown (April 3, 1951 – August 14, 2003) - politician and former member of the Minnesota House of Representatives (1985 – 1996)
- Jerry Koosman - former Major League Baseball pitcher
- Martin J. McGowan, Jr. (October 28, 1920 – August 13, 2009) - editor, publisher of the Appleton Press, (1942 - 1964), and former member of the Minnesota House of Representatives (1959 – 1966)
- Brad Rheingans - former professional wrestler
- Clinton Sundberg - Hollywood actor
- Herbert A. Winkelmann - pioneering rubber chemist at B.F. Goodrich
- Edward T. Young (October 27, 1858 – September 19, 1940) - Minnesota Attorney General (1905 - 1909), Minnesota House of Representatives (1889 - 1890 and 1893 - 1894) and Minnesota Senate (1895 - 1902)
