= North Roseau, Minnesota =

Unorganized territory of Roseau County, Minnesota

Coordinates: 48°57′59″N 95°40′49″W

- Unorganized territory
- Location of North Roseau, within Roseau County, Minnesota
- Country: United States
- State: Minnesota
- County: Roseau

Area
  - Total: 119.7 sq mi (310 km^{2})
  - Land: 119.68 sq mi (310.0 km^{2})
  - Water: 0.01 sq mi (0.026 km^{2})

Population (2020)
  - Total: 161
  - Density: 1.35/sq mi (0.519/km^{2})
- Time zone: UTC-6 (Central (CST))
  - Summer (DST): UTC-5 (CDT)
- Area code: 218

North Roseau is an unorganized territory in Roseau County, Minnesota, United States. The population was 161 at the 2020 census.

== Geography ==
According to the United States Census Bureau, the unorganized territory has a total area of 119.8 square miles (310.2 km^{2}); 119.8 square miles (310.2 km^{2}) is land and 0.01% is water.

== Demographics ==
As of the census of 2000, there were 160 people, 55 households, and 47 families residing in the unorganized territory. The population density was 1.3 inhabitants per square mile (0.50/km^{2}). There were 65 housing units at an average density of 0.5 per square mile (0.19/km^{2}). The racial makeup of the unorganized territory was 98.12% White, 1.25% Asian, and 0.62% from two or more races.

There were 55 households, out of which 45.5% had children under the age of 18 living with them, 70.9% were married couples living together, 7.3% had a female householder with no husband present, and 14.5% were non-families. 12.7% of all households were made up of individuals, and 5.5% had someone living alone who was 65 years of age or older. The average household size was 2.91 and the average family size was 3.17.

In the unorganized territory the population was spread out, with 30.0% under the age of 18, 6.9% from 18 to 24, 28.8% from 25 to 44, 21.3% from 45 to 64, and 13.1% who were 65 years of age or older. The median age was 37 years. For every 100 females, there were 105.1 males. For every 100 females age 18 and over, there were 115.4 males.

The median income for a household in the unorganized territory was $43,750, and the median income for a family was $44,583. Males had a median income of $31,528 versus $20,972 for females. The per capita income for the unorganized territory was $18,447. None of the population or families were below the poverty line.
