= Northwest Roseau, Minnesota =

Unorganized territory in Roseau County, Minnesota

Coordinates: 48°55′15″N 96°16′21″W

- Unorganized territory
- Location of Northwest Roseau, within Roseau County, Minnesota
- Country: United States
- State: Minnesota
- County: Roseau

Area
  - Total: 125.97 sq mi (326.3 km^{2})
  - Land: 122.84 sq mi (318.2 km^{2})
  - Water: 3.13 sq mi (8.1 km^{2})

Population (2020)
  - Total: 28
  - Density: 0.23/sq mi (0.088/km^{2})
- Time zone: UTC-6 (Central (CST))
  - Summer (DST): UTC-5 (CDT)
- Area code: 218

Northwest Roseau is an unorganized territory in Roseau County, Minnesota, United States. The population was 28 at the 2020 census.

== Geography ==
According to the United States Census Bureau, the unorganized territory has a total area of 125.9 square miles (326.2 km^{2}); 114.4 square miles (296.3 km^{2}) is land and 11.5 square miles (29.9 km^{2}) (9.16%) is water.

== Demographics ==
As of the census of 2000, there were 18 people, 7 households, and 4 families residing in the unorganized territory. The population density was 0.2 inhabitants per square mile (0.077/km^{2}). There were 22 housing units at an average density of 0.2 per square mile (0.077/km^{2}). The racial makeup of the unorganized territory was 100.00% White.

There were 7 households, out of which 28.6% had children under the age of 18 living with them, 71.4% were married couples living together, and 28.6% were non-families. 28.6% of all households were made up of individuals, and none had someone living alone who was 65 years of age or older. The average household size was 2.57 and the average family size was 3.20.

In the unorganized territory the population was spread out, with 16.7% under the age of 18, 11.1% from 18 to 24, 11.1% from 25 to 44, 50.0% from 45 to 64, and 11.1% who were 65 years of age or older. The median age was 48 years. For every 100 females, there were 80.0 males. For every 100 females age 18 and over, there were 87.5 males.

The median income for a household in the unorganized territory was $55,625, and the median income for a family was $56,250. Males had a median income of $0 versus $0 for females. The per capita income for the unorganized territory was $25,867. None of the population or the families were below the poverty line.
