= St. Cloud metropolitan area =

Metropolitan area in Minnesota, United States

- Metropolitan statistical area
- St. Cloud, MN Metropolitan Statistical Area
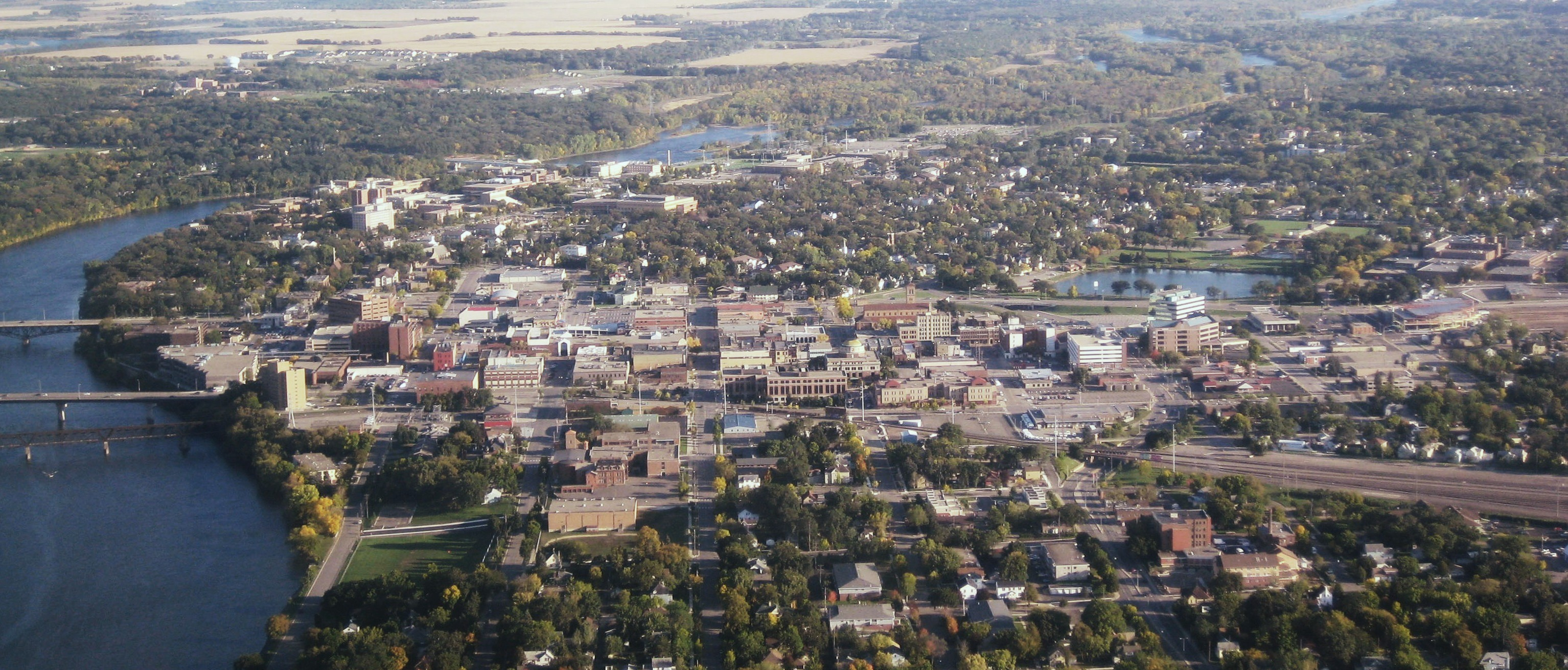
- Downtown St. Cloud
Interactive map of St. Cloud, MN MSA
City of St. Cloud
St. Cloud, MN MSA
Other Counties in the Minneapolis–St. Paul, MN-WI CSA
- Country: United States
- State: Minnesota
- Largest city: St. Cloud

Area
  - Total: 1,803 sq mi (4,670 km^{2})

Population (2020)
  - Total: 199,671 (Metro); 4,078,788 (Combined)
  - Estimate (2025): 205,854 (Metro); 4,188,378 (Combined)
  - Rank: Metro: 231st in the U.S. Combined: 16th in the U.S.
- Time zone: UTC–6 (Central (CST))
  - Summer (DST): UTC–5 (CDT)

Map of the 21 counties of the Minneapolis-St. Paul, MN-WI Combined Statistical Area as of 2018. MSA counties under the Metropolitan Council Minneapolis-St. Paul-Bloomington MSA counties defined by the Census as "central" Minneapolis-St. Paul-Bloomington MSA counties defined by the Census as "outlying" Counties included in the St. Cloud Metropolitan Statistical Area Counties that are separate Micropolitan Statistical Areas

The St. Cloud Metropolitan Statistical Area, as defined by the Office of Management and Budget, consists of two counties in central Minnesota, anchored by the city of St. Cloud. As of the 2020 census, the MSA had a population of 199,671, increasing to an estimated 205,854 in 2025.

The St. Cloud Metropolitan Statistical Area is part of the Minneapolis-Saint Paul, MN-WI Combined Statistical Area.

== Counties ==
County	Seat	2025 Estimate	2020 Census	Change	Area	Density
Stearns	St. Cloud	164,110	158,292	+3.68%	1,390 sq mi (3,600 km^{2})	118/sq mi (46/km^{2})
Benton	Foley	41,744	41,379	+0.88%	413 sq mi (1,070 km^{2})	101/sq mi (39/km^{2})
Total		205,854	199,671	+3.10%	1,803 sq mi (4,670 km^{2})	114/sq mi (44/km^{2})

== Communities ==
The following are cities, towns, and villages in the St. Cloud Metropolitan Statistical Area categorized based on United States Census Bureau 2025 population estimates. No population estimates are released for census-designated places (CDPs), which are marked with an asterisk (*). They are categorized based on their 2020 Census population.

=== Principal city ===
- St. Cloud (partial) (Note: St. Cloud lies in three counties – Stearns, Benton, and Sherburne. Most of the city is in Stearns County with small portions extending into the neighboring counties. The portion of St. Cloud in Sherburne County is part of the Minneapolis–St. Paul–Bloomington Metropolitan Statistical Area, while the Stearns and Benton County portions are part of the St. Cloud Metropolitan Statistical Area.) (72,647)

=== Places with 5,000 to 20,000 inhabitants ===
- Sartell (19,918)
- Sauk Rapids (13,768)
- Waite Park (8,450)
- St. Joseph (6,846)

=== Places with 1,000 to 5,000 inhabitants ===
- Sauk Centre (4,663)
- Cold Spring (4,329)
- Melrose (3,888)
- St. Augusta (3,799)
- Albany (2,873)
- Foley (2,650)
- Paynesville (2,591)
- Rockville (2,492)
- Clearwater (partial) (2,225)
- Rice (2,212)
- Avon (1,777)
- St. John's University* (1,585)
- Richmond (1,515)
- Royalton (partial) (1,274)
- Eden Valley (partial) (1,062)

=== Places with fewer than 1,000 inhabitants ===
- Kimball (924)
- St. Stephen (827)
- Holdingford (745)
- Belgrade (737)
- Freeport (678)
- Brooten (partial) (650)
- Fairhaven* (392)
- New Munich (363)
- St. Martin (313)
- Gilman (255)
- Elrosa (218)
- Greenwald (207)
- Meire Grove (185)
- Roscoe (133)
- St. Anthony (92)
- Lake Henry (76)
- Ronneby* (71)
- Spring Hill (70)
- St. Rosa (58)

=== Unincorporated places ===
- Brennyville
- Duelm
- Fruitville
- Glendorado
- Granite Ledge
- Jakeville
- Mayhew
- North Benton
- Oak Park
- Opole
- Parent
- Popple Creek
- Rum River
- Silver Corners
- Watab

== Townships ==
=== Benton County ===
- Alberta Township
- Gilmanton Township
- Glendorado Township
- Graham Township
- Granite Ledge Township
- Langola Township
- Mayhew Lake Township
- Maywood Township
- Minden Township
- Sauk Rapids Township
- St. George Township
- Watab Township

=== Stearns County ===
- Albany Township
- Ashley Township
- Avon Township
- Brockway Township
- Collegeville Township
- Crow Lake Township
- Crow River Township
- Eden Lake Township
- Fair Haven Township
- Farming Township
- Getty Township
- Grove Township
- Holding Township
- Krain Township
- Lake George Township
- Lake Henry Township
- Le Sauk Township
- Luxemburg Township
- Lynden Township
- Maine Prairie Township
- Melrose Township
- Millwood Township
- Munson Township
- North Fork Township
- Oak Township
- Paynesville Township
- Raymond Township
- Sauk Centre Township
- Spring Hill Township
- St. Joseph Township
- St. Martin Township
- St. Wendel Township
- Wakefield Township
- Zion Township

== Demographics ==
Historical population
Census	Pop.	Note	%±
1850	418		—
1860	5,132		1,127.8%
1870	15,764		207.2%
1880	24,968		58.4%
1890	41,128		64.7%
1900	54,376		32.2%
1910	59,348		9.1%
1920	69,814		17.6%
1930	77,177		10.5%
1940	83,306		7.9%
1950	86,592		3.9%
1960	97,632		12.7%
1970	116,241		19.1%
1980	133,348		14.7%
1990	148,976		11.7%
2000	167,392		12.4%
2010	189,093		13.0%
2020	199,671		5.6%
2025 (est.)	205,854		3.1%
U.S. Decennial Census

At the 2000 census, there were 167,392 people, 60,669 households and 40,650 families residing within the MSA. The racial makeup of the MSA was 96.04% White, 0.82% African American, 0.31% Native American, 1.49% Asian, 0.04% Pacific Islander, 0.45% from other races, and 0.84% from two or more races. Hispanic or Latino of any race were 1.27% of the population.

The median household income was $42,197 and the median family income was $51,415. Males had a median income of $33,741 compared with $23,065 for females. The per capita income was $19,110.

== See also ==
- Minnesota census statistical areas
