= Minnesota's 7th congressional district =

U.S. House district for Minnesota

Coordinates: 46°33′11″N 95°40′33″W

- Interactive map of district boundaries from January 3, 2023
- Representative: Michelle Fischbach; R–Regal
- Area: 31,796 mi^{2} (82,350 km^{2})
- Distribution: 64.13% rural; 35.87% urban
- Population (2025): 720,120
- Median household income: $79,172
- Ethnicity: 88.1% White; 5.3% Hispanic; 3.0% Two or more races; 1.6% Black; 0.9% Asian; 0.8% Native American; 0.3% other
- Cook PVI: R+18

Minnesota's 7th congressional district covers the majority of western Minnesota. It is by far the state's largest district, and has a very rural character. Except for a few southern counties in the 1st district, the 7th includes almost all of Western Minnesota. Cities in the district include Moorhead (its largest city), Willmar, Alexandria, and Fergus Falls.

The district is currently represented by Republican Michelle Fischbach. With a Cook Partisan Voting Index rating of R+18, it is the most Republican district in Minnesota. Despite this, it was represented by DFL member Collin Peterson from 1991 to 2021; Peterson was considered one of the most conservative Democrats in the House.

== Recent election results from statewide races ==
Year	Office	Results
2008	President	McCain 51% - 45%
2008	Senate	Coleman 48% - 35%
2010	Governor	Emmer 49% - 38%
2010	Secretary of State	Severson 51% - 42%
2010	Auditor	Anderson 54% - 41%
2010	Attorney General	Swanson 47% - 46%
2012	President	Romney 55% - 42%
2012	Senate	Klobuchar 61% - 35%
2014	Senate	McFadden 48% - 47%
2014	Governor	Johnson 52% - 42%
2014	Secretary of State	Severson 54% - 39%
2014	Auditor	Gilbert 47% - 45%
2014	Attorney General	Newman 47% - 45%
2016	President	Trump 63% - 29%
2018	Senate (Reg.)	Newberger 50% - 47%
2018	Senate (Spec.)	Housley 57% - 39%
2018	Governor	Johnson 59% - 38%
2018	Secretary of State	Howe 60% - 36%
2018	Auditor	Myhra 59% - 35%
2018	Attorney General	Wardlow 61% - 34%
2020	President	Trump 66% - 32%
2020	Senate	Lewis 61% - 32%
2022	Governor	Jensen 65% - 31%
2022	Secretary of State	Crockett 65% - 34%
2022	Auditor	Wilson 66% - 29%
2022	Attorney General	Schultz 69% - 31%
2024	President	Trump 67% - 31%
2024	Senate	White 57% - 40%
2026	Senate	Tafoya 65% - 32%
2026	Governor	Demuth 65% - 34%
2026	Secretary of State	Jude 63% - 34%
2026	Auditor	Jensen 66% - 31%
2026	Attorney General	Schutz 67% - 33%

== Composition ==
For the 118th and successive Congresses (based on redistricting following the 2020 census), the district contains all or portions of the following counties, townships, and municipalities:

Becker County (29)

Atlanta Township, Audubon, Burlington Township, Carsonville Township, Cormorant Township, Cuba Township, Detroit Lakes, Detroit Township, Erie Township, Evergreen Township, Frazee, Green Valley Township, Hamden Township, Height of Land Township, Holmesville Township, Lake Eunice Township, Lake Park, Lake Park Township, Lake View Township, Osage Township, Richwood Township, Runeberg Township, Shell Lake Township, Silver Leaf Township, Spruce Grove Township, Toad Lake Township, Walworth Township, Wolf Lake, Wolf Lake Township

Big Stone County (22)

All 22 townships and municipalities

Brown County (10)

Bashaw Township, Burnstown Township, Cobden, Comfrey (shared with Cottonwood County), Leavenworth Township, Mulligan Township, North Star Township, Prairieville Township (part; also 1st), Springfield, Stately Township

Chippewa County (22)

All 22 townships and municipalities

Clay County (41)

All 41 townships and municipalities

Cottonwood County (25)

All 25 townships and municipalities

Douglas County (31)

All 31 townships and municipalities

Grant County (23)

All 23 townships and municipalities

Hubbard County (13)

Akeley, Akeley Township (part; also 8th), Badoura Township, Crow Wing Lake Township, Henrietta Township, Hubbard Township, Mantrap Township, Nevis, Nevis Township, Park Rapids, Straight River Township, Todd Township, White Oak Township

Kandiyohi County (36)

All 36 townships and municipalities

Kittson County (38)

All 38 townships and municipalities

Lac qui Parle County (29)

All 29 townships and municipalities

Lincoln County (20)

All 20 townships and municipalities

Lyon County (31)

All 31 townships and municipalities

McLeod County (23)

All 23 townships and municipalities

Marshall County (59)

All 59 townships and municipalities

Meeker County (26)

All 26 townships and municipalities

Morrison County (46)

All 46 townships and municipalities

Murray County (29)

All 29 townships and municipalities

Norman County (32)

All 32 townships and municipalities

Otter Tail County (83)

All 83 townships and municipalities

Pennington County (24)

All 24 townships and municipalities

Pipestone County (21)

All 21 townships and municipalities

Polk County (73)

All 73 townships and municipalities

Pope County (30)

All 30 townships and municipalities

Red Lake County (17)

All 17 townships and municipalities

Redwood County (41)

All 41 townships and municipalities

Renville County (37)

All 37 townships and municipalities

Roseu County (39)

All 39 townships and municipalities

Sibley County (25)

All 25 townships and municipalities

Stearns County (52)

Albany, Albany Township, Ashley Township, Avon, Avon Township, Belgrade, Brockway Township, Cold Spring, Crow Lake Township, Crow River Township, Eden Lake Township, Eden Valley (shared with Meeker County), Elrosa, Farming Township, Freeport, Getty Township, Greenwald, Grove Township, Holding Township, Holdingford, Kimball, Krain Township, Lake George Township, Lake Henry, Lake Henry Township, Luxemberg Township, Maine Prairie Township, Meire Grove, Melrose, Melrose Township, Millwood Township, Munson Township, New Munich, North Fork Township, Oak Township, Paynesville, Paynesville Township, Raymond Township, Richmond, Roscoe, Sauk Centre, Sauk Centre Township, Spring Hill, Spring Hill Township, St. Anthony, St. Martin, St. Martin Township, St. Rosa, St. Stephen, St. Wendel Township (part; 6th), Wakefield Township, Zion Township

Stevens County (29)

All 29 townships and municipalities

Swift County (29)

All 29 townships and municipalities

Todd County (39)

All 39 townships and municipalities

Traverse County (19)

All 19 townships and municipalities

Wadena County (23)

All 23 townships and municipalities

Wilkin County (30)

All 30 townships and municipalities

Yellow Medicine County (30)

All 30 townships and municipalities

== Demographics ==
According to the APM Research Lab's Voter Profile Tools (featuring the U.S. Census Bureau's 2019 American Community Survey), the district contained about 501,000 potential voters (citizens, age 18+). Of these, 91% are White and 9% are people of color. Immigrants make up 2% of the district's potential voters. Median income among households (with one or more potential voter) in the district is about $61,000, while 9% of households live below the poverty line. As for the educational attainment of potential voters in the district, 8% of those 25 and older have not earned a high school degree, while 22% hold a bachelor's or higher degree.

== List of members representing the district ==
Member	Party	Years	Cong ress	Electoral history
District created March 4, 1893
Haldor Boen (Fergus Falls)	Populist	March 4, 1893 – March 3, 1895	53rd	Elected in 1892. Lost re-election.
Frank Eddy (Glenwood)	Republican	March 4, 1895 – March 3, 1903	54th 55th 56th 57th	Elected in 1894. Re-elected in 1896. Re-elected in 1898. Re-elected in 1900. Retired.
Andrew Volstead (Granite Falls)	Republican	March 4, 1903 – March 3, 1923	58th 59th 60th 61st 62nd 63rd 64th 65th 66th 67th	Elected in 1902. Re-elected in 1904. Re-elected in 1906. Re-elected in 1908. Re-elected in 1910. Re-elected in 1912. Re-elected in 1914. Re-elected in 1916. Re-elected in 1918. Re-elected in 1920. Lost re-election.
Ole J. Kvale (Benson)	Farmer–Labor	March 4, 1923 – September 11, 1929	68th 69th 70th 71st	Elected in 1922. Re-elected in 1924. Re-elected in 1926. Re-elected in 1928. Died.
Vacant		September 11, 1929 – October 16, 1929	71st	
Paul John Kvale (Benson)	Farmer–Labor	October 16, 1929 – March 3, 1933	71st 72nd	Elected to finish his father's term. Re-elected in 1930. Redistricted to the at-large district.
District inactive		March 4, 1933 – January 3, 1935	73rd	All representatives elected at-large on a general ticket.
Paul John Kvale (Benson)	Farmer–Labor	January 3, 1935 – January 3, 1939	74th 75th	Redistricted from the at-large district and re-elected in 1934. Re-elected in 1936. Lost re-election.
Herman Carl Andersen (Tyler)	Republican	January 3, 1939 – January 3, 1963	76th 77th 78th 79th 80th 81st 82nd 83rd 84th 85th 86th 87th	Elected in 1938. Re-elected in 1940. Re-elected in 1942. Re-elected in 1944. Re-elected in 1946. Re-elected in 1948. Re-elected in 1950. Re-elected in 1952. Re-elected in 1954. Re-elected in 1956. Re-elected in 1958. Re-elected in 1960. Redistricted to the 6th district and lost renomination.
Odin Langen (Kennedy)	Republican	January 3, 1963 – January 3, 1971	88th 89th 90th 91st	Redistricted from the 9th district and re-elected in 1962. Re-elected in 1964. Re-elected in 1966. Re-elected in 1968. Lost re-election.
Robert Bergland (Roseau)	Democratic (DFL)	January 3, 1971 – January 22, 1977	92nd 93rd 94th 95th	Elected in 1970. Re-elected in 1972. Re-elected in 1974. Re-elected in 1976. Resigned to become U.S. Secretary of Agriculture.
Vacant		January 22, 1977 – February 22, 1977	95th	
Arlan Stangeland (Barnesville)	Republican	February 22, 1977 – January 3, 1991	95th 96th 97th 98th 99th 100th 101st	Elected to finish Bergland's term. Re-elected in 1978. Re-elected in 1980. Re-elected in 1982. Re-elected in 1984. Re-elected in 1986. Re-elected in 1988. Lost re-election.
Collin Peterson (Detroit Lakes)	Democratic (DFL)	January 3, 1991 – January 3, 2021	102nd 103rd 104th 105th 106th 107th 108th 109th 110th 111th 112th 113th 114th 115th 116th	Elected in 1990. Re-elected in 1992. Re-elected in 1994. Re-elected in 1996. Re-elected in 1998. Re-elected in 2000. Re-elected in 2002. Re-elected in 2004. Re-elected in 2006. Re-elected in 2008. Re-elected in 2010. Re-elected in 2012. Re-elected in 2014. Re-elected in 2016. Re-elected in 2018. Lost re-election.
Michelle Fischbach (Regal)	Republican	January 3, 2021 – present	117th 118th 119th	Elected in 2020. Re-elected in 2022. Re-elected in 2024. Re-elected in 2026.

== Recent election results ==
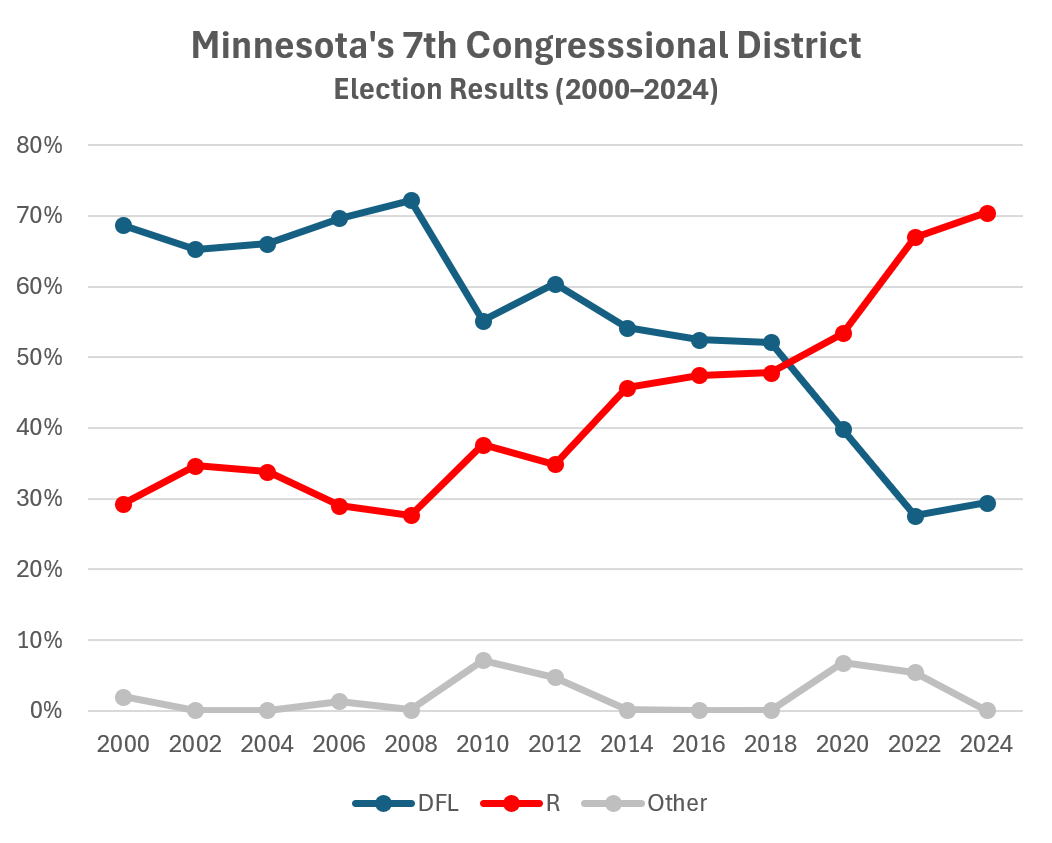
Minnesota's 7th Congressional District election history (2000–2024)

=== 2002 ===
2002 Minnesota's 7th congressional district election
Party	Candidate	Votes	%	±%
Democratic (DFL)	Collin Peterson (incumbent)	170,234	65.3	▼3.4
Republican	Dan Stevens	90,342	34.6	▲5.4
Write-In	Others	237	0.1	N/A
Total votes		260,813	100.00	
Democratic (DFL) hold				

=== 2004 ===
2004 Seventh Congressional District of Minnesota election
Party	Candidate	Votes	%	±%
Democratic (DFL)	Collin Peterson (incumbent)	207,628	66.1	▲0.8
Republican	David Sturrock	106,349	33.8	▼0.8
Write-in		280	0.1	Steady
Total votes		314,257	100.00	
Democratic (DFL) hold				

=== 2006 ===
2006 Seventh Congressional District of Minnesota election
Party	Candidate	Votes	%	±%
Democratic (DFL)	Collin Peterson (incumbent)	179,164	69.7	▲3.6
Republican	Michael Barrett	74,557	29.0	▼4.9
Constitution	Ken Lucier	3,303	1.3	N/A
Write-in		170	0.1	Steady
Total votes		257,194	100.0	
Democratic (DFL) hold				

=== 2008 ===
2008 Seventh Congressional District of Minnesota election
Party	Candidate	Votes	%	±%
Democratic (DFL)	Collin Peterson (incumbent)	227,180	72.2	▲2.5
Republican	Glen Menze	87,062	27.7	▼1.3
Write-in		431	0.1	▲0.1
Total votes		314,680	100.0	
Democratic (DFL) hold				

=== 2010 ===
2010 Seventh Congressional District of Minnesota election
Party	Candidate	Votes	%	±%
Democratic (DFL)	Collin Peterson (incumbent)	159,479	55.2	▼17.0
Republican	Lee Byberg	90,650	37.6	▲9.9
Independent	Gene Waldorf	9,317	3.9	N/A
Independence	Glen R. Menze	7,839	3.3	N/A
Write-in		193	0.1	▼0.1
Total votes		241,097	100.0	
Democratic (DFL) hold				

=== 2012 ===
2012 Seventh Congressional District of Minnesota election
Party	Candidate	Votes	%	±%
Democratic (DFL)	Collin Peterson (incumbent)	197,791	60.4	▲5.2
Republican	Lee Byberg	114,151	34.8	▼2.8
Independence	Adam Steele	15,298	4.7	▲1.4
Write-in		336	0.1	Steady
Total votes		327,576	100.0	
Democratic (DFL) hold				

=== 2014 ===
2014 Seventh Congressional District of Minnesota election
Party	Candidate	Votes	%	±%
Democratic (DFL)	Collin Peterson (incumbent)	130,546	54.2	▼6.2
Republican	Torrey Westrom	109,955	45.7	▲10.8
Write-in		334	0.1	Steady
Total votes		240,835	100.0	
Democratic (DFL) hold				

=== 2016 ===
2016 Seventh Congressional District of Minnesota election
Party	Candidate	Votes	%	±%
Democratic (DFL)	Collin Peterson (incumbent)	173,589	52.5	▼1.7
Republican	Dave Hughes	156,952	47.4	▲1.8
Write-in		307	0.1	Steady
Total votes		330,848	100.0	
Democratic (DFL) hold				

=== 2018 ===
2018 Seventh Congressional District of Minnesota election
Party	Candidate	Votes	%	±%
Democratic (DFL)	Collin Peterson (incumbent)	146,672	52.1	▼0.4
Republican	Dave Hughes	134,668	47.8	▲0.4
Write-in		168	0.1	Steady
Total votes		281,509	100.0	
Democratic (DFL) hold				

=== 2020 ===
Minnesota's 7th congressional district, 2020
Party	Candidate	Votes	%	±%
Republican	Michelle Fischbach	194,066	53.4	▲5.6
Democratic (DFL)	Collin Peterson (incumbent)	144,840	39.8	▼12.3
Legal Marijuana Now	Slater Johnson	17,710	4.9	N/A
Grassroots	Rae Hart Anderson	6,499	1.8	N/A
Write-in		362	0.1	Steady
Total votes		363,477	100.0	
Republican gain from Democratic (DFL)				

=== 2022 ===
Minnesota's 7th congressional district, 2022
Party	Candidate	Votes	%	±%
Republican	Michelle Fischbach (incumbent)	204,766	66.9	▲13.6
Democratic (DFL)	Jill Abahsain	84,455	27.6	▼12.2
Legal Marijuana Now	Travis Johnson	16,421	5.4	▲0.5
Write-in		224	0.1	Steady
Total votes		305,866	100.0	
Republican hold				

=== 2024 ===
2024 Minnesota's 7th congressional district election
Party	Candidate	Votes	%	±%
Republican	Michelle Fischbach (incumbent)	275,098	70.4	▲3.5
Democratic (DFL)	John Peters	114,979	29.4	▲1.8
Write-in		433	0.1	Steady
Total votes		390,510	100.0	
Republican hold				

== Historical district boundaries ==
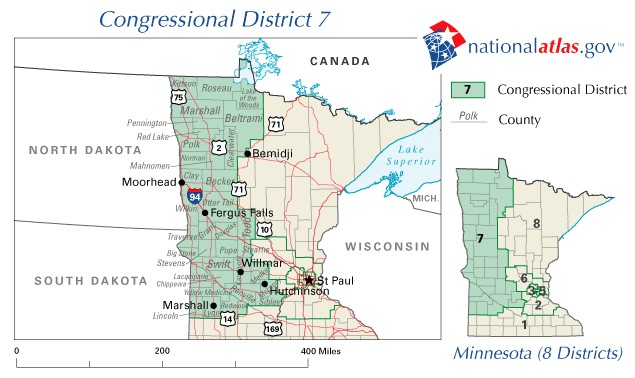
2003–2013

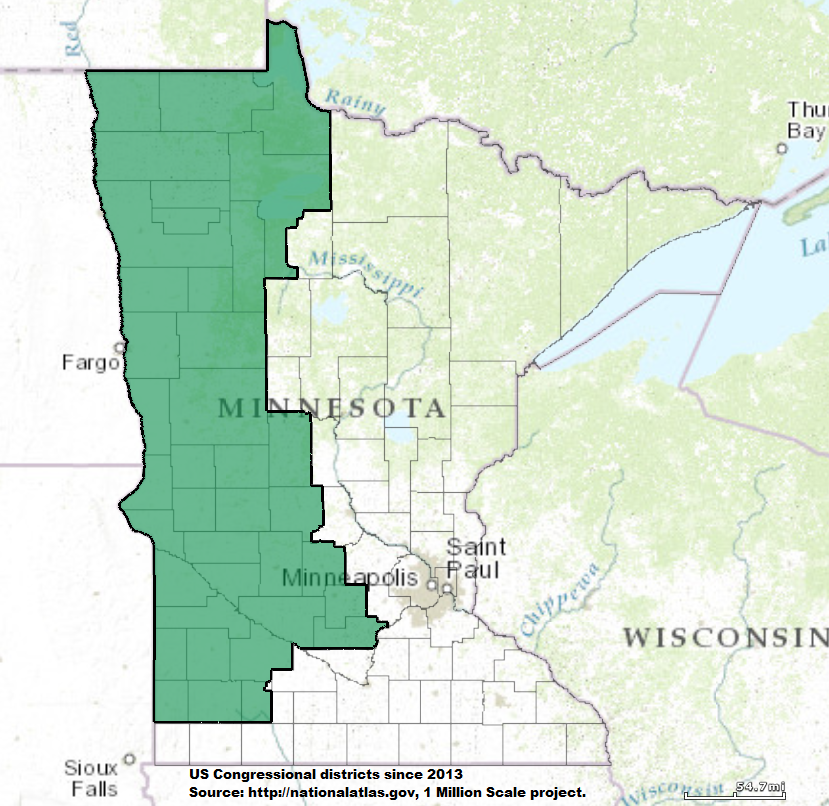
2013–2023

== See also ==
- Minnesota's congressional districts
- List of United States congressional districts
