= Farming, Minnesota =

Farming
- Unincorporated community
- Location within Minnesota Location within the United States
- Coordinates: 45°30′55″N 94°35′53″W
- Country: United States
- State: Minnesota
- County: Stearns
- Township: Farming Township
- Elevation: 1,184 ft (361 m)
- Time zone: UTC-6 (Central (CST))
  - Summer (DST): UTC-5 (CDT)
- ZIP code: 56307 and 56368
- Area code: 320
- GNIS feature ID: 643569

Farming is an unincorporated community in Farming Township, Stearns County, Minnesota, United States. The community is located near the junction of Stearns County Roads 23, 41, and 42. Nearby places include Albany, Richmond, and St. Martin.
