= Brockway Township =

Brockway Township may refer to:

- Brockway Township, Michigan
- Brockway Township, Minnesota
