= Collegeville, Minnesota =

Collegeville
- Unincorporated community
- Location within Minnesota Location within the United States
- Coordinates: 45°35′40″N 94°21′47″W
- Country: United States
- State: Minnesota
- County: Stearns
- Township: St. Wendel Township
- Elevation: 1,096 ft (334 m)
- Time zone: UTC-6 (Central (CST))
  - Summer (DST): UTC-5 (CDT)
- ZIP Codes: 56321 and 56374
- Area code: 320
- GNIS feature ID: 641398

Collegeville is an unincorporated community in St. Wendel Township, Stearns County, Minnesota, United States, near St. Joseph. The community is located near the junction of Collegeville Road and Old Collegeville Road. Nearby is Saint John's Abbey, a large Benedictine monastery.

== History ==
The community was named for Saint John's University.

St. John's Indian Industrial School was a Native American residential school that operated in Collegeville from 1885 to 1896 that was run by Saint John's University. In 1888, Native residential school students made up 47 percent of the student population of Saint John's.

The disappearance of Joshua Guimond, a student at Saint John's University, happened on campus in 2002.

== Geography ==
Collegeville is located within section 32 of St. Wendel Township. Collegeville Township lies to the southwest.

=== Climate ===
Climate data for Saint John's University (1991–2020 normals, extremes 1893–present)
Month	Jan	Feb	Mar	Apr	May	Jun	Jul	Aug	Sep	Oct	Nov	Dec	Year
Record high °F (°C)	56 (13)	60 (16)	81 (27)	95 (35)	103 (39)	102 (39)	106 (41)	100 (38)	103 (39)	89 (32)	78 (26)	61 (16)	106 (41)
Mean daily maximum °F (°C)	20.8 (−6.2)	26.1 (−3.3)	38.7 (3.7)	54.1 (12.3)	67.3 (19.6)	76.6 (24.8)	80.9 (27.2)	78.4 (25.8)	70.5 (21.4)	55.8 (13.2)	38.9 (3.8)	25.7 (−3.5)	52.8 (11.6)
Daily mean °F (°C)	12.3 (−10.9)	17.0 (−8.3)	29.5 (−1.4)	43.6 (6.4)	56.6 (13.7)	66.3 (19.1)	70.9 (21.6)	68.6 (20.3)	60.6 (15.9)	46.8 (8.2)	31.5 (−0.3)	18.3 (−7.6)	43.5 (6.4)
Mean daily minimum °F (°C)	3.8 (−15.7)	7.8 (−13.4)	20.2 (−6.6)	33.1 (0.6)	46.0 (7.8)	55.9 (13.3)	60.8 (16.0)	58.8 (14.9)	50.7 (10.4)	37.9 (3.3)	24.1 (−4.4)	10.9 (−11.7)	34.2 (1.2)
Record low °F (°C)	−39 (−39)	−37 (−38)	−30 (−34)	2 (−17)	19 (−7)	33 (1)	40 (4)	39 (4)	23 (−5)	7 (−14)	−19 (−28)	−35 (−37)	−39 (−39)
Average precipitation inches (mm)	0.82 (21)	0.89 (23)	1.72 (44)	2.72 (69)	3.96 (101)	4.60 (117)	3.90 (99)	4.09 (104)	2.96 (75)	2.75 (70)	1.63 (41)	1.00 (25)	31.04 (788)
Average snowfall inches (cm)	11.2 (28)	10.2 (26)	10.1 (26)	6.6 (17)	0.1 (0.25)	0.0 (0.0)	0.0 (0.0)	0.0 (0.0)	0.0 (0.0)	0.7 (1.8)	8.0 (20)	10.5 (27)	57.4 (146)
Average precipitation days (≥ 0.01 in)	6.8	6.1	7.7	8.7	11.3	11.3	9.7	9.4	9.4	9.0	6.7	7.2	103.3
Average snowy days (≥ 0.1 in)	7.2	6.0	4.9	1.9	0.0	0.0	0.0	0.0	0.0	0.5	3.7	8.0	32.2
Source: NOAA
