= Georgeville =

Georgeville may refer to:

United States

- Georgeville, Minnesota
- Georgeville, Missouri

Canada

- Georgeville, Nova Scotia
