= St. Wendel, Minnesota =

St. Wendel
- Unincorporated community
- Location within Minnesota Location within the United States
- Coordinates: 45°39′58″N 94°22′40″W
- Country: United States
- State: Minnesota
- County: Stearns
- Township: St. Wendel Township
- Elevation: 1,211 ft (369 m)
- Time zone: UTC-6 (Central (CST))
  - Summer (DST): UTC-5 (CDT)
- ZIP code: 56374 and 56310
- Area code: 320
- GNIS feature ID: 651083

St. Wendel is an unincorporated community in St. Wendel Township, Stearns County, Minnesota, United States, near St. Joseph and Avon. The community is located along Stearns County Road 4 near 130th Avenue. Stearns County Road 3 is also in the immediate area.
