= St. Nicholas, Minnesota =

St. Nicholas
- Unincorporated community
- Location within Minnesota Location within the United States
- Coordinates: 45°22′51″N 94°26′12″W
- Country: United States
- State: Minnesota
- County: Stearns
- Township: Luxemburg Township
- Elevation: 1,188 ft (362 m)
- Time zone: UTC-6 (Central (CST))
  - Summer (DST): UTC-5 (CDT)
- ZIP code: 55389 and 56368
- Area code: 320
- GNIS feature ID: 650921

St. Nicholas is an unincorporated community in Luxemburg Township, Stearns County, Minnesota, United States. The community is located along Stearns County Road 21 near County Road 165. Nearby places include Cold Spring, Richmond, and Watkins.
