= Lake George Township =

Lake George Township may refer to:

- Lake George Township, Hubbard County, Minnesota
- Lake George Township, Stearns County, Minnesota
- Lake George Township, McHenry County, North Dakota, in McHenry County, North Dakota
- Lake George Township, Charles Mix County, South Dakota, in Charles Mix County, South Dakota
