= Georgeville, Minnesota =

Georgeville
- Unincorporated community
- Location within Minnesota Location within the United States
- Coordinates: 45°25′43″N 94°55′38″W
- Country: United States
- State: Minnesota
- County: Stearns
- Township: Crow River Township
- Elevation: 1,240 ft (380 m)
- Time zone: UTC-6 (Central (CST))
  - Summer (DST): UTC-5 (CDT)
- ZIP code: 56312
- Area code: 320
- GNIS feature ID: 644086

Georgeville is an unincorporated community in Crow River Township, Stearns County, Minnesota, United States, near Belgrade. The community is located along State Highway 55 (MN 55) near its junction with County Road 69, 393rd Avenue.

== History ==
In the 1970s, Georgeville was the site of a hippie commune that inspired the Minnesota co-op movement.
