= Opole, Minnesota =

Opole
- Unincorporated community
- Location within Minnesota Location within the United States
- Coordinates: 45°44′48″N 94°22′08″W
- Country: United States
- State: Minnesota
- County: Stearns
- Township: Brockway Township
- Elevation: 1,165 ft (355 m)
- Time zone: UTC-6 (Central (CST))
  - Summer (DST): UTC-5 (CDT)
- ZIP code: 56340
- Area code: 320
- GNIS feature ID: 648980

Opole is an unincorporated community in Brockway Township, Stearns County, Minnesota, United States. The community is located along Stearns County Road 17 near 125th Avenue. Stearns County Road 3 is also in the immediate area. Nearby places include Holdingford, St. Stephen, and Rice.
