= Adley Creek =

Stream in Stearns County, Minnesota, U.S.

Coordinates: 45°43′7.55″N 94°47′3.11″W

Adley Creek is a stream in Stearns County, in the U.S. state of Minnesota.

Adley Creek was named for Warren Adley, an early settler and state legislator.

== See also ==
- List of rivers of Minnesota
