= Stearns County, Minnesota =

County in Minnesota, United States

- County
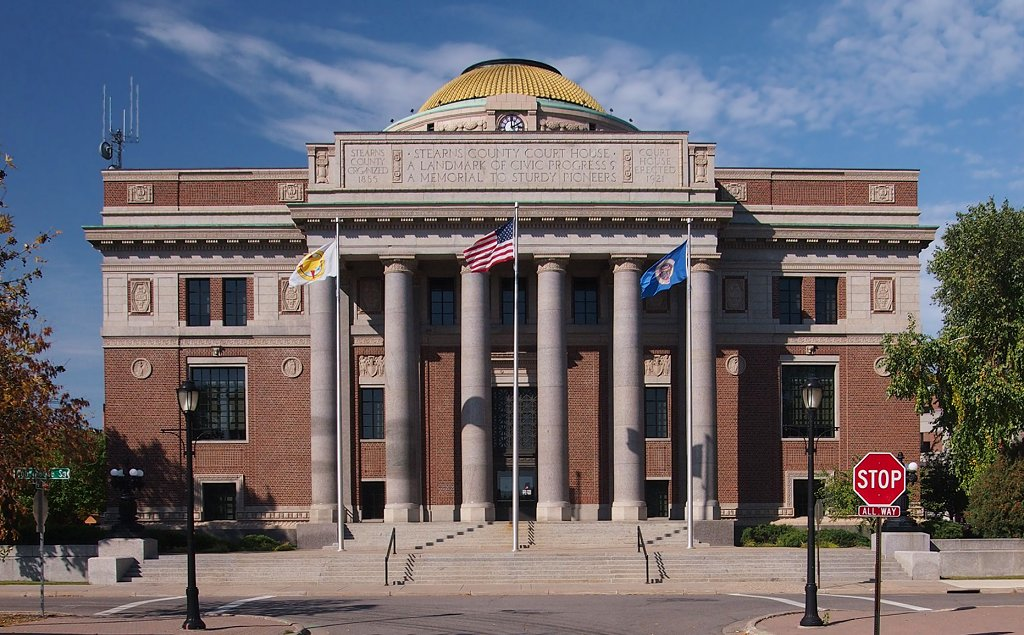
- Stearns County Courthouse

- Location within the U.S. state of Minnesota
- Coordinates: 45°33′N 94°37′W
- Country: United States
- State: Minnesota
- Founded: February 20, 1855
- Named for: Charles Thomas Stearns
- Seat: St. Cloud
- Largest city: St. Cloud

Area
  - Total: 1,390 sq mi (3,600 km^{2})
  - Land: 1,343 sq mi (3,480 km^{2})
  - Water: 47 sq mi (120 km^{2}) 3.4%

Population (2020)
  - Total: 158,292
  - Estimate (2025): 164,110 ▲
  - Density: 117.9/sq mi (45.51/km^{2})
- Time zone: UTC−6 (Central)
  - Summer (DST): UTC−5 (CDT)
- Congressional districts: 6th, 7th
- Website: www.stearnscountymn.gov

Stearns County is a county in the U.S. state of Minnesota. As of the 2020 census, the population was 158,292. Its county seat and largest city is St. Cloud.

Included within the Minnesota Territory since 1849, the county was founded by European Americans in 1855. It was originally named for Isaac Ingalls Stevens, then renamed for Charles Thomas Stearns. Stearns County is part of the St. Cloud Metropolitan Statistical Area, which is also included in the Minneapolis-Saint Paul Combined Statistical Area.

== History ==
The Stearns County area was formerly occupied by numerous indigenous tribes, such as the Dakota, Ojibwe, and Ho-chunk. The first large immigration was of German Catholics in the 1850s. Early arrivals also came from eastern states. The Wisconsin Territory was established by the federal government effective July 3, 1836, and existed until its eastern portion was granted statehood (as Wisconsin) in 1848.

The federal government set up the Minnesota Territory effective March 3, 1849. The newly organized territorial legislature created nine counties across the territory in October of that year. The original counties had portions partitioned off in 1851 to create Cass County and in 1853 to create Sibley, Pierce, and Nicollet Counties. In 1855 parts of those counties were partitioned off to create Stearns County. It was to be named Stevens County for territorial governor Isaac Ingalls Stevens, who had conducted an expedition through the area in 1853, but due to a clerical error, the county was named for Charles Thomas Stearns, a member of the Territorial Council. (To compensate for this error the area two counties west was later named Stevens County.)

The February 20, 1855, act that created the county directed the naming of three county commissioners and specified St. Cloud as the county seat.

In 1997, historian of American religious architecture Marilyn J. Chiat wrote, "Father Francis X. Pierz, a missionary to Indians in central Minnesota, published a series of articles in 1851 in German Catholic newspapers advocating Catholic settlement in central Minnesota. Large numbers of immigrants, mainly German, but also Slovenian and Polish, responded. Over 20 parishes were formed in what is now Stearns County, each centered on a church-oriented hamlet. As the farmers prospered, the small frame churches were replaced by more substantial buildings of brick or stone such as St. Mary, Help of Christians, a Gothic Revival stone structure built in 1873. Stearns County retains in its German character and is still home to one of the largest rural Catholic populations in Anglo-America."

Furthermore, according to Kathleen Neils Conzen, "Stearns County Germans early established daughter settlements at West Union in Todd County, Millerville in Douglas County, and Pierz in Morrison County, later flooded into North Dakota (where 'Stearns County German' remains a recognized ethnicity today), and in 1905 negotiated with the Canadian authorities to establish the St. Peter Colony in north-central Saskatchewan."

The first courthouse was put into service on July 12, 1864, and remained in use until the present courthouse was dedicated in 1922. In 1913 a campaign was mounted to shift the county seat to Albany, due to its more central location. The effort was not successful.

Stearns County also had many farmers' markets and crop trades, making it one of Minnesota's top-grossing crop-producing counties.

== Geography ==
Soils of Stearns County

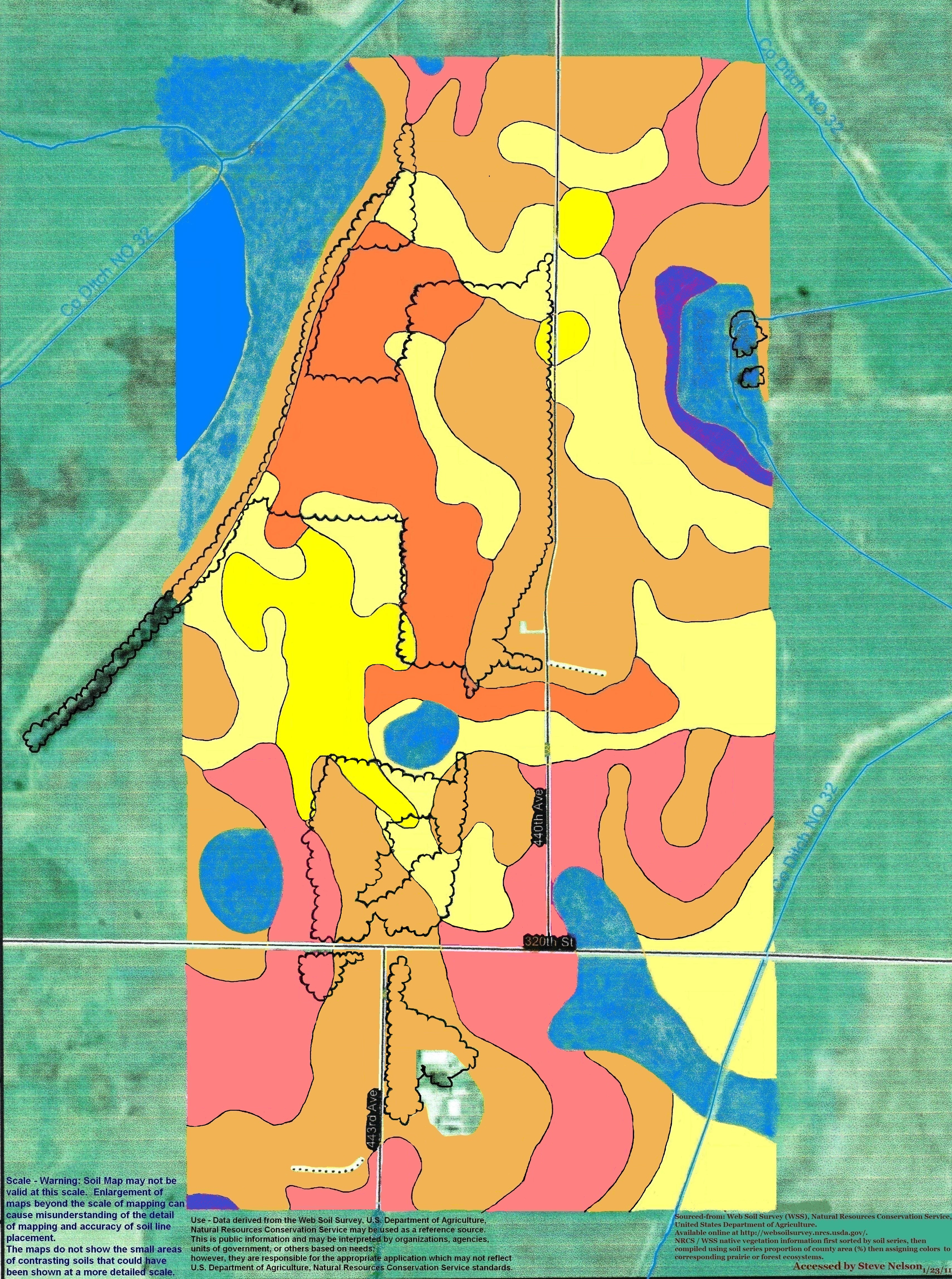
Soils of Padua area

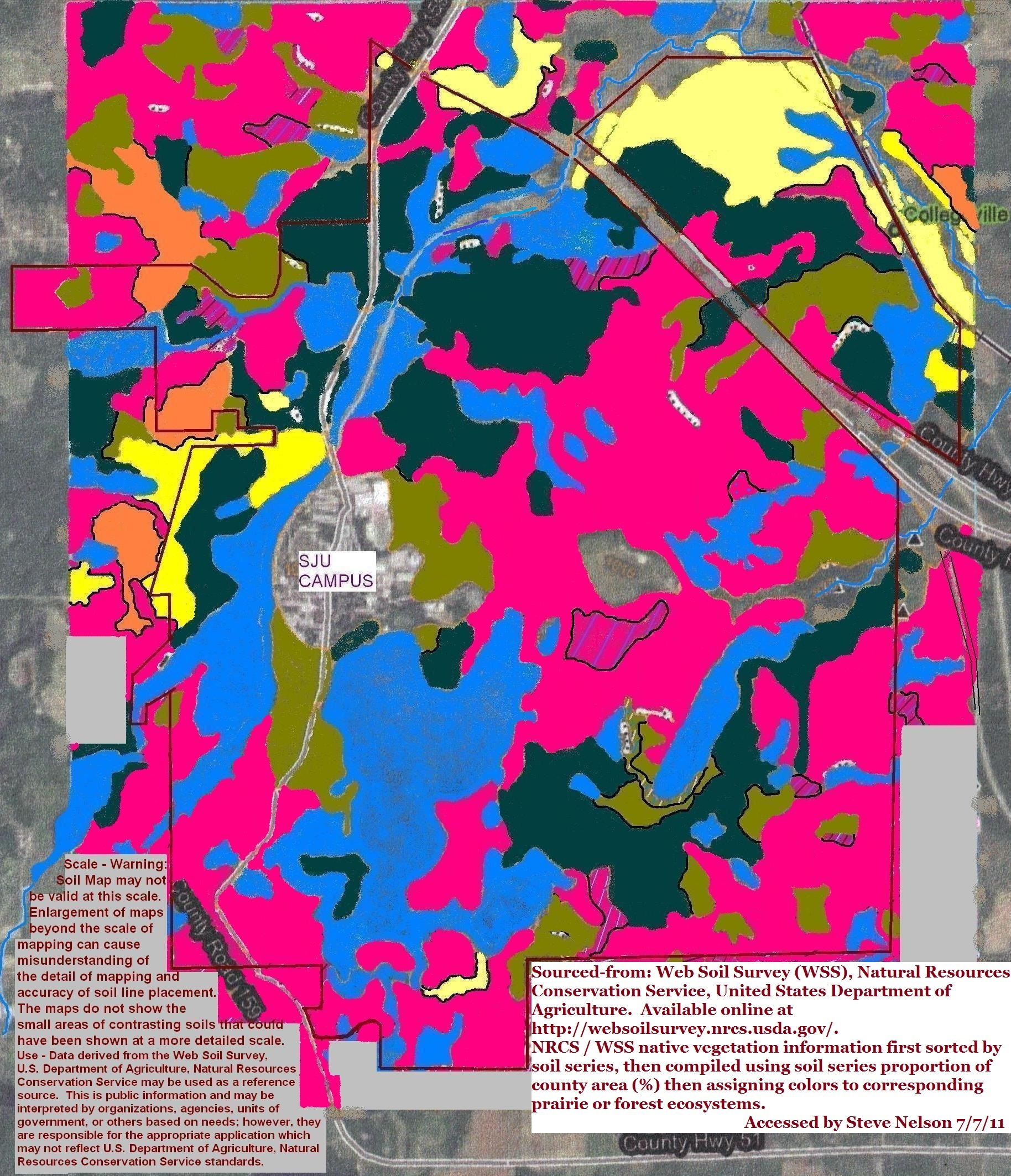
Soils of St. John's University area

Stearns County borders nine counties. The Mississippi River flows southeast along its northeast border, and the Sauk River drains the central part of the county into the Mississippi at St. Cloud. The county terrain consists of low rolling hills, lightly wooded, dotted with lakes and ponds, and carved with drainages. All available area is devoted to agriculture or has been developed. The terrain slopes to the east and south, with its highest point a local protuberance at 7.6 miles (12.2 km) west and 1.6 miles (2.6 km) south of St. Joseph, at 1,461 ft (445 m) ASL. The county has an area of 1,390 square miles (3,600 km^{2}), of which 1,343 square miles (3,480 km^{2}) is land and 47 square miles (120 km^{2}) (3.4%) is water.

The Mississippi River forms Stearns County's northeastern border. The land consists of rolling hills, scenic lakes, prairies, savannas, and woodlands of a mixture of coniferous and deciduous trees. Stearns is one of 17 Minnesota savanna region counties with more savanna soils than either prairie or forest soils. The county has 166 lakes.

=== Major highways ===
- Interstate 94
- U.S. Highway 52
- U.S. Highway 71
- Minnesota State Highway 4
- Minnesota State Highway 15
- Minnesota State Highway 22
- Minnesota State Highway 23
- Minnesota State Highway 24
- Minnesota State Highway 28
- Minnesota State Highway 55
- Minnesota State Highway 237
- Minnesota State Highway 238
- List of county roads

=== Airports ===
- Brooten Municipal Airport (6D1) - east of Brooten
- Paynesville Municipal Airport (PEX) - west of Paynesville
- Sauk Centre Municipal Airport (D39) - south-southeast of Sauk Centre
- St. Cloud Regional Airport (STC) - east-southeast of St. Cloud

=== Adjacent counties ===
- Todd County - north
- Morrison County - northeast
- Benton County - northeast
- Sherburne County - east
- Wright County - southeast
- Meeker County - south
- Kandiyohi County - southwest
- Pope County - west
- Douglas County - northwest

=== Protected areas ===
Sources:

- Avon Hills Forest Scientific and Natural Area
- Birch Lakes State Forest
- Christopher Kurilla Wildlife Management Area
- Cold Spring Heron Colony Scientific and Natural Area
- Crow River Wildlife Management Area
- Edward Raymond Mohs Wildlife Management Area
- Follies Wildlife Management Area (part)
- Lake Koronis Regional Park
- Legacy Marsh Wildlife Management Area
- Miller Wildlife Management Area
- Milton Kjedahl Wildlife Management Area
- Norman T. Dahlman Wildlife Management Area
- Oxcart Crossing Wildlife Management Area
- Padua State Wildlife Management Area
- Patch Woods Scientific and Natural Area
- Quarry Park and Nature Preserve
- Quarry Park Scientific and Natural Area
- Rockville County Park and Nature Preserve
- Roscoe Prairie Scientific and Natural Area
- Saint Wendel Tamarack Bog Scientific and Natural Area
- Sauk River Wildlife Management Area
- Sedan Brook Prairie Scientific and Natural Area
- Stearns Prairie Heritage Wildlife Management Area
- Tamarack State Wildlife Management Area
- Tower State Wildlife Management Area
- Tribute Wildlife Management Area
- Victor Winder Wildlife Management Area
- Warner Lake County Park
- Zion State Wildlife Management Area

=== Lakes and streams ===
- Adley Creek
- Crow Lake

== Demographics ==
Historical population
Census	Pop.	Note	%±
1860	4,505		—
1870	14,206		215.3%
1880	21,956		54.6%
1890	34,844		58.7%
1900	44,464		27.6%
1910	47,733		7.4%
1920	55,741		16.8%
1930	62,121		11.4%
1940	67,200		8.2%
1950	70,681		5.2%
1960	80,345		13.7%
1970	95,400		18.7%
1980	108,161		13.4%
1990	118,791		9.8%
2000	133,166		12.1%
2010	150,642		13.1%
2020	158,292		5.1%
2025 (est.)	164,110	▲	3.7%
U.S. Decennial Census; 1790-1960 1900-1990; 1990-2000 2010-2020

=== 2020 census ===
As of the 2020 census, the county had a population of 158,292. The median age was 36.5 years. 23.6% of residents were under the age of 18 and 16.1% of residents were 65 years of age or older. For every 100 females there were 101.4 males, and for every 100 females age 18 and over there were 100.7 males age 18 and over.

The racial makeup of the county was 82.7% White, 8.4% Black or African American, 0.4% American Indian and Alaska Native, 2.0% Asian, <0.1% Native Hawaiian and Pacific Islander, 2.2% from some other race, and 4.2% from two or more races. Hispanic or Latino residents of any race comprised 4.4% of the population.

62.0% of residents lived in urban areas, while 38.0% lived in rural areas.

There were 60,448 households in the county, of which 29.3% had children under the age of 18 living in them. Of all households, 50.3% were married-couple households, 19.1% were households with a male householder and no spouse or partner present, and 22.9% were households with a female householder and no spouse or partner present. About 27.6% of all households were made up of individuals and 10.5% had someone living alone who was 65 years of age or older.

There were 65,684 housing units, of which 8.0% were vacant. Among occupied housing units, 68.8% were owner-occupied and 31.2% were renter-occupied. The homeowner vacancy rate was 1.0% and the rental vacancy rate was 6.8%.

=== Racial and ethnic composition ===
Stearns County, Minnesota – Racial and ethnic composition Note: the US Census treats Hispanic/Latino as an ethnic category. This table excludes Latinos from the racial categories and assigns them to a separate category. Hispanics/Latinos may be of any race.
Race / Ethnicity (NH = Non-Hispanic)	Pop 1980	Pop 1990	Pop 2000	Pop 2010	Pop 2020	% 1980	% 1990	% 2000	% 2010	% 2020
White alone (NH)	106,798	116,726	126,764	136,414	129,276	98.74%	98.26%	95.19%	90.56%	81.67%
Black or African American alone (NH)	153	408	1,064	4,595	13,224	0.14%	0.34%	0.80%	3.05%	8.35%
Native American or Alaska Native alone (NH)	198	294	328	392	439	0.18%	0.25%	0.25%	0.26%	0.28%
Asian alone (NH)	455	821	2,086	2,949	3,159	0.42%	0.69%	1.57%	1.96%	2.00%
Native Hawaiian or Pacific Islander alone (NH)	x	x	38	38	61	x	x	0.03%	0.03%	0.04%
Other race alone (NH)	200	30	64	107	435	0.18%	0.03%	0.05%	0.07%	0.27%
Mixed race or Multiracial (NH)	x	x	995	1,957	4,747	x	x	0.75%	1.30%	3.00%
Hispanic or Latino (any race)	357	512	1,827	4,190	6,951	0.33%	0.43%	1.37%	2.78%	4.39%
Total	108,161	118,791	133,166	150,642	158,292	100.00%	100.00%	100.00%	100.00%	100.00%

=== 2000 census ===
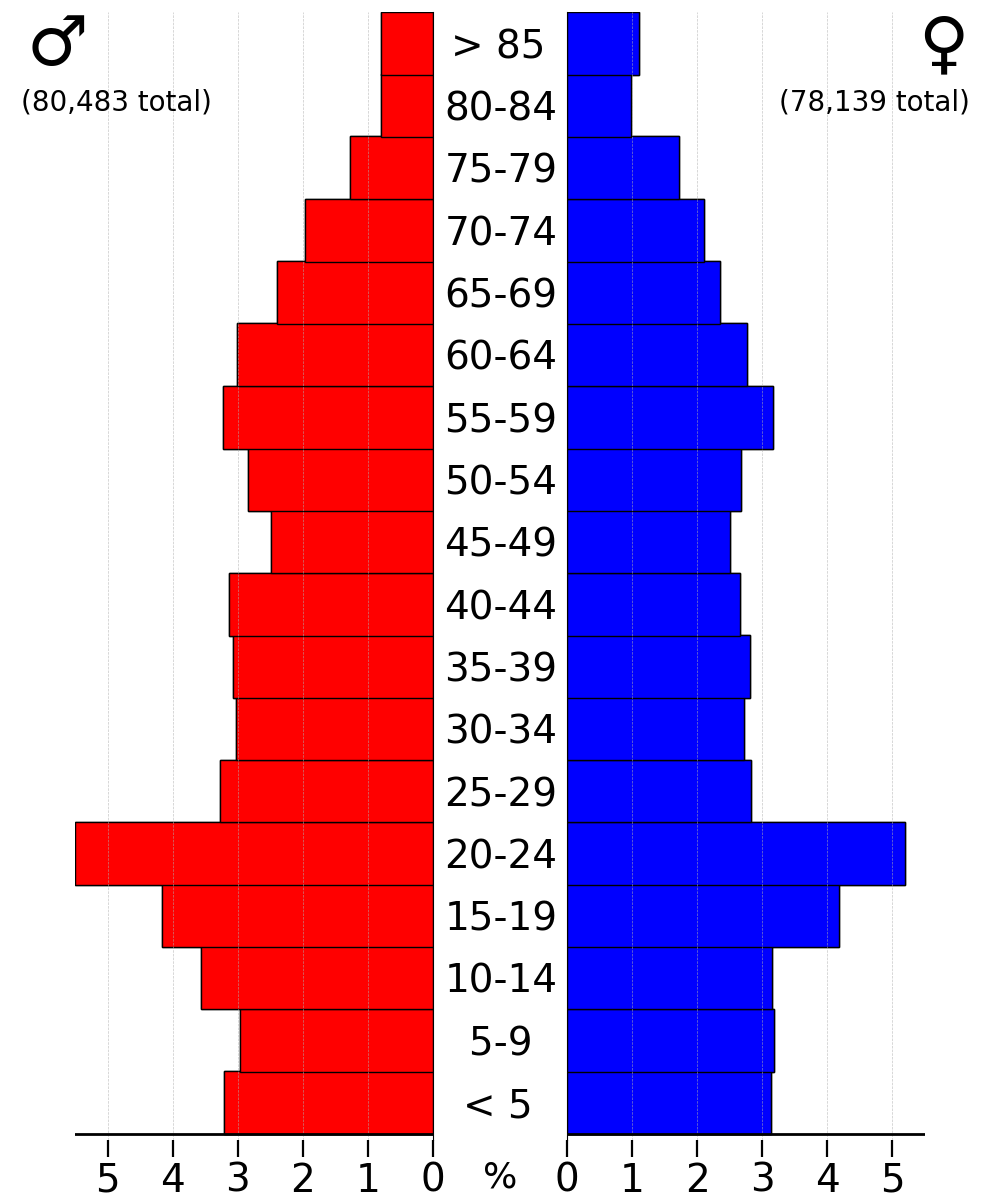
2022 US Census population pyramid for Stearns County, from ACS 5-year estimates

As of the census of 2000, there were 133,166 people, 47,604 households, and 32,132 families in the county. The population density was 99.2 per square mile (38.3/km^{2}). There were 50,291 housing units at an average density of 37.4 per square mile (14.4/km^{2}). The racial makeup of the county was 95.99% White, 0.83% Black or African American, 0.26% Native American, 1.58% Asian, 0.03% Pacific Islander, 0.47% from other races, and 0.82% from two or more races. 1.37% of the population were Hispanic or Latino of any race. 56.9% were of German and 9.4% Norwegian ancestry.

There were 47,604 households, out of which 35.00% had children under the age of 18 living with them, 56.30% were married couples living together, 7.50% had a female householder with no husband present, and 32.50% were non-families. 23.60% of all households were made up of individuals, and 8.40% had someone living alone who was 65 years of age or older. The average household size was 2.64 and the average family size was 3.15.

The county population contained 25.70% under the age of 18, 16.10% from 18 to 24, 28.00% from 25 to 44, 19.10% from 45 to 64, and 11.00% who were 65 years of age or older. The median age was 32 years. For every 100 females, there were 101.20 males. For every 100 females age 18 and over, there were 99.80 males.

The median income for a household in the county was $42,426, and the median income for a family was $51,553. Males had a median income of $34,268 versus $23,393 for females. The per capita income for the county was $19,211. About 4.30% of families and 8.70% of the population were below the poverty line, including 6.70% of those under age 18 and 8.60% of those age 65 or over.

== Communities ==
=== Cities ===
- Albany
- Avon
- Belgrade
- Brooten (part)
- Clearwater (part)
- Cold Spring
- Eden Valley (part)
- Elrosa
- Freeport
- Greenwald
- Holdingford
- Kimball
- Lake Henry
- Meire Grove
- Melrose
- New Munich
- Paynesville
- Richmond
- Rockville
- Roscoe
- Saint Anthony
- Saint Augusta
- Saint Cloud (county seat; partial)
- Saint Joseph
- Saint Martin
- Saint Rosa
- Saint Stephen
- Sartell (part)
- Sauk Centre
- Spring Hill
- Waite Park

=== Census-designated place ===
- Fairhaven
- St. John's University

=== Unincorporated communities ===
- Collegeville
- Farming
- Five Points
- Georgeville
- Jacobs Prairie
- Marty
- Opole
- Padua
- Saint Anna
- Saint Francis
- Saint Nicholas
- Saint Wendel

=== Townships ===
- Albany Township
- Ashley Township
- Avon Township
- Brockway Township
- Collegeville Township
- Crow Lake Township
- Crow River Township
- Eden Lake Township
- Fair Haven Township
- Farming Township
- Getty Township
- Grove Township
- Holding Township
- Krain Township
- Lake George Township
- Lake Henry Township
- Le Sauk Township
- Luxemburg Township
- Lynden Township
- Maine Prairie Township
- Melrose Township
- Millwood Township
- Munson Township
- North Fork Township
- Oak Township
- Paynesville Township
- Raymond Township
- Saint Joseph Township
- Saint Martin Township
- Saint Wendel Township
- Sauk Centre Township
- Spring Hill Township
- Wakefield Township
- Zion Township

== Politics and government ==
In its early history, Stearns County was heavily Democratic due to being largely German Catholic and opposed to the pietistic Scandinavian Lutheran Republican Party of that era. It did not vote Republican until Theodore Roosevelt swept every Minnesota county in 1904. Anti-Woodrow Wilson feeling from World War I caused the county to shift overwhelmingly to Warren G. Harding in 1920 before swinging to Robert M. La Follette, coreligionist Al Smith and fellow “wet” Democrat Franklin D. Roosevelt.

In 1936, the county's isolationism gave strong support to William Lemke’s Union Party. Stearns County turned Republican until another Catholic nominee, John F. Kennedy, returned it to the Democratic ranks after being one of only 130 counties nationwide to back George McGovern in 1972. Since the “Reagan Revolution”, Stearns County has voted reliably Republican, with no Democrat gaining a majority since Jimmy Carter in 1976, and Bill Clinton in 1996 the only one to manage a plurality. The county's growing social conservative bent has fueled the Republican trend.

In 2016, Donald Trump won the county with 59.8% of the vote, the highest percentage any presidential candidate has received since Dwight Eisenhower in 1956. Trump improved on that in 2020 with 60.1% of the vote.

As of 2024, one city in the county leans Democratic: St. Cloud, the largest city.

United States presidential election results for Stearns County, Minnesota
Year	Republican		Democratic		Third party(ies)	
Year	No.	%	No.	%	No.	%
1892	1,624	23.68%	4,461	65.04%	774	11.28%
1896	2,873	36.06%	4,911	61.64%	183	2.30%
1900	2,460	35.55%	4,244	61.33%	216	3.12%
1904	2,849	50.43%	2,625	46.47%	175	3.10%
1908	2,614	38.75%	3,835	56.86%	296	4.39%
1912	1,134	17.63%	3,317	51.55%	1,983	30.82%
1916	4,312	54.44%	3,350	42.29%	259	3.27%
1920	13,566	86.33%	1,616	10.28%	532	3.39%
1924	6,469	37.36%	1,354	7.82%	9,491	54.82%
1928	6,459	28.56%	16,104	71.21%	52	0.23%
1932	4,499	19.52%	18,293	79.36%	258	1.12%
1936	5,262	23.30%	12,760	56.51%	4,558	20.19%
1940	16,027	63.01%	9,305	36.58%	102	0.40%
1944	13,298	60.37%	8,647	39.25%	84	0.38%
1948	10,153	39.50%	15,261	59.37%	292	1.14%
1952	18,267	64.75%	9,907	35.12%	39	0.14%
1956	17,364	63.70%	9,829	36.06%	64	0.23%
1960	13,522	41.50%	19,026	58.40%	33	0.10%
1964	13,009	40.44%	19,063	59.26%	94	0.29%
1968	15,422	45.93%	15,990	47.62%	2,168	6.46%
1972	18,951	45.78%	19,315	46.65%	3,134	7.57%
1976	19,574	40.93%	25,027	52.33%	3,220	6.73%
1980	24,888	48.31%	21,862	42.43%	4,772	9.26%
1984	30,216	58.51%	20,944	40.55%	485	0.94%
1988	27,529	52.85%	23,798	45.68%	766	1.47%
1992	22,502	37.92%	21,451	36.15%	15,387	25.93%
1996	21,474	39.01%	24,238	44.03%	9,333	16.96%
2000	32,402	51.86%	24,800	39.70%	5,274	8.44%
2004	41,726	55.21%	32,659	43.21%	1,192	1.58%
2008	41,194	52.31%	35,690	45.32%	1,872	2.38%
2012	43,015	54.81%	33,551	42.75%	1,911	2.44%
2016	47,617	59.83%	25,576	32.13%	6,399	8.04%
2020	50,959	60.07%	31,879	37.58%	1,997	2.35%
2024	53,932	62.25%	30,829	35.59%	1,871	2.16%

== See also ==
- National Register of Historic Places listings in Stearns County, Minnesota
