= St. Francis, Stearns County, Minnesota =

St. Francis
- Unincorporated community
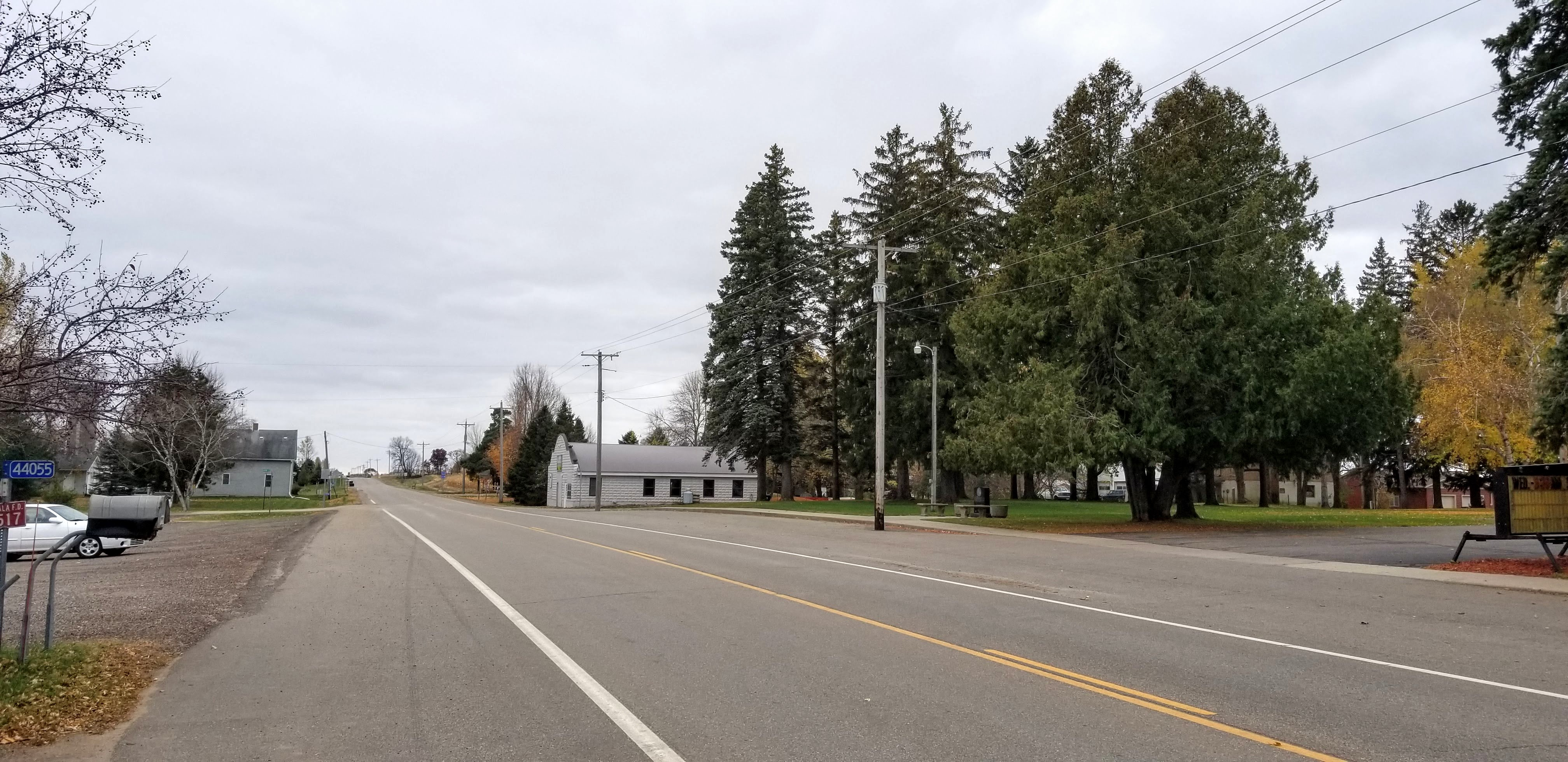
- Minnesota Highway 238 at St. Francis

- Location within Minnesota Location within the United States
- Coordinates: 45°45′36″N 94°35′06″W
- Country: United States
- State: Minnesota
- County: Stearns
- Township: Krain Township
- Elevation: 1,250 ft (380 m)
- Time zone: UTC-6 (Central (CST))
  - Summer (DST): UTC-5 (CDT)
- ZIP code: 56331
- Area code: 320
- GNIS feature ID: 650580

St. Francis is an unincorporated community in Krain Township, Stearns County, Minnesota, United States, near Albany and Freeport.

The community is located along State Highway 238 (MN 238) near its junction with 440th Street.

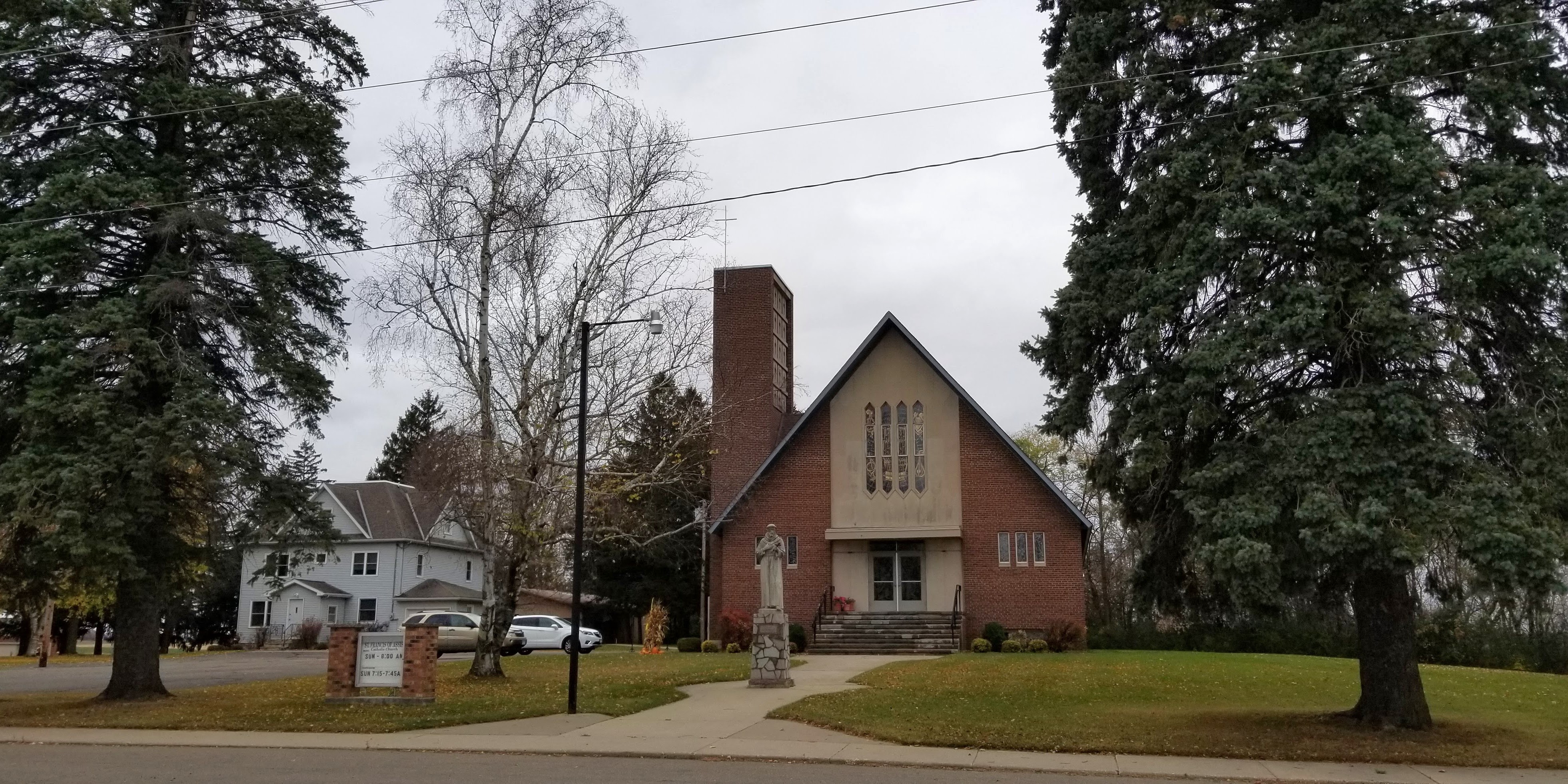
St. Francis of Assisi Catholic Church
