= Five Points, Minnesota =

Five Points
- Unincorporated community
- Location within Minnesota Location within the United States
- Coordinates: 45°36′28″N 94°15′40″W
- Country: United States
- State: Minnesota
- County: Stearns
- Township: Le Sauk Township
- Elevation: 1,060 ft (320 m)
- Time zone: UTC-6 (Central (CST))
  - Summer (DST): UTC-5 (CDT)
- ZIP code: 56374 and 56377
- Area code: 320
- GNIS feature ID: 654705

Five Points is an unincorporated community in Le Sauk Township, Stearns County, Minnesota, United States, near Sartell and St. Cloud. It is located at the junction of Stearns County Roads 4 and 133, 6th Street South.
