= Lynden Township, Stearns County, Minnesota =

Lynden Township, Minnesota
- Township
- Location within the state of Minnesota
- Coordinates: 45°24′N 94°6′W
- Country: United States
- State: Minnesota
- County: Stearns

Area
  - Total: 25.5 sq mi (66.0 km^{2})
  - Land: 23.9 sq mi (62.0 km^{2})
  - Water: 1.6 sq mi (4.1 km^{2})
- Elevation: 971 ft (296 m)

Population (2010)
  - Total: 1,938
  - Density: 81.0/sq mi (31.3/km^{2})
- Time zone: UTC-6 (Central (CST))
  - Summer (DST): UTC-5 (CDT)
- FIPS code: 27-38780
- GNIS feature ID: 0664847
- Website: https://www.lyndenmn.gov/

Lynden Township is a township in Stearns County, Minnesota, United States. The population was 1,938 at the 2010 census.

Lynden Township was organized in 1859.

== Geography ==
According to the United States Census Bureau, the township has a total area of 25.5 mi^{2} (66 km^{2}), of which 23.9 mi^{2} (62 km^{2}) is land and 1.6 mi^{2} (4.1 km^{2}) (6.20%) is water.

It is bounded on the east by the Mississippi River.

Lynden Township is located mainly in Township 122 North of the Arkansas Base Line and Range 27 West of the 5th Principal Meridian.

== Demographics ==
As of the census of 2000, there were 1,919 people, 642 households, and 541 families residing in the township. The population density was 80.2 inhabitants per square mile (31.0/km^{2}). There were 688 housing units at an average density of 28.8 per square mile (11.1/km^{2}). The racial makeup of the township was 99.22% White, 0.31% Asian, 0.26% from other races, and 0.21% from two or more races. Hispanic or Latino of any race were 0.57% of the population.

There were 642 households, out of which 44.5% had children under the age of 18 living with them, 74.9% were married couples living together, 4.7% had a female householder with no husband present, and 15.7% were non-families. 10.6% of all households were made up of individuals, and 2.6% had someone living alone who was 65 years of age or older. The average household size was 2.99 and the average family size was 3.24.

In the township the population was spread out, with 31.0% under the age of 18, 6.8% from 18 to 24, 31.9% from 25 to 44, 24.1% from 45 to 64, and 6.1% who were 65 years of age or older. The median age was 35 years. For every 100 females, there were 108.1 males. For every 100 females age 18 and over, there were 107.2 males.

The median income for a household in the township was $57,765, and the median income for a family was $59,259. Males had a median income of $39,306 versus $26,042 for females. The per capita income for the township was $21,405. About 2.8% of families and 3.2% of the population were below the poverty line, including 2.1% of those under the age of 18 and 2.6% of those 65 and older.
