= Millwood Township, Stearns County, Minnesota =

Millwood Township, Minnesota
- Township
- Location within the state of Minnesota Millwood Township, Minnesota (the United States)
- Coordinates: 45°43′N 94°42′W
- Country: United States
- State: Minnesota
- County: Stearns

Area
  - Total: 41.4 sq mi (107.3 km^{2})
  - Land: 39.0 sq mi (100.9 km^{2})
  - Water: 2.5 sq mi (6.4 km^{2})
- Elevation: 1,211 ft (369 m)

Population (2010)
  - Total: 972
  - Density: 25.0/sq mi (9.63/km^{2})
- Time zone: UTC-6 (Central (CST))
  - Summer (DST): UTC-5 (CDT)
- FIPS code: 27-42308
- GNIS feature ID: 0664978

Millwood Township is a township in Stearns County, Minnesota, United States. The population was 972 at the 2010 census. The township includes the city of St. Rosa.

Millwood Township was organized in 1871.

== Geography ==
According to the United States Census Bureau, the township has a total area of 41.4 square miles (107.3 km^{2}); 39.0 square miles (100.9 km^{2}) is land and 2.5 square miles (6.4 km^{2}), or 6.01%, is water.

Millwood Township is located in Township 126 North of the Arkansas Base Line and Range 32 West of the 5th Principal Meridian.

== Government ==
The township board meets on the last Monday of every month in St. Rosa.

== Demographics ==
As of the census of 2000, there were 986 people, 318 households, and 271 families residing in the township. The population density was 25.3 people per square mile (9.8/km^{2}). There were 380 housing units at an average density of 9.8/sq mi (3.8/km^{2}). The racial makeup of the township was 99.80% White and 0.20% African American.

There were 318 households, out of which 41.8% had children under the age of 18 living with them, 77.7% were married couples living together, 3.5% had a female householder with no husband present, and 14.5% were non-families. 12.3% of all households were made up of individuals, and 6.0% had someone living alone who was 65 years of age or older. The average household size was 3.10 and the average family size was 3.39.

In the township the population was spread out, with 31.4% under the age of 18, 7.5% from 18 to 24, 28.7% from 25 to 44, 23.3% from 45 to 64, and 9.0% who were 65 years of age or older. The median age was 34 years. For every 100 females, there were 114.3 males. For every 100 females age 18 and over, there were 116.0 males.

The median income for a household in the township was $46,071, and the median income for a family was $49,844. Males had a median income of $32,692 versus $22,619 for females. The per capita income for the township was $18,236. About 7.1% of families and 8.0% of the population were below the poverty line, including 7.3% of those under age 18 and 9.4% of those age 65 or over.
