= Crow Lake (Stearns County, Minnesota) =

Lake in the state of Minnesota, United States

- Location within Minnesota
- Location: Stearns County, Minnesota
- Coordinates: 45°26′18″N 95°02′16″W
- Basin countries: United States
- Surface elevation: 1,260 ft (380 m)

Crow Lake is a lake in Stearns County, Minnesota. Crow Lake lies at an elevation of 1260 feet (384 m).
