= St. Martin Township, Stearns County, Minnesota =

St. Martin Township, Minnesota
- Township
- Location within the state of Minnesota St. Martin Township, Minnesota (the United States)
- Coordinates: 45°32′N 94°42′W
- Country: United States
- State: Minnesota
- County: Stearns

Area
  - Total: 34.6 sq mi (89.5 km^{2})
  - Land: 34.4 sq mi (89.1 km^{2})
  - Water: 0.15 sq mi (0.4 km^{2})
- Elevation: 1,178 ft (359 m)

Population (2010)
  - Total: 545
  - Density: 15.8/sq mi (6.12/km^{2})
- Time zone: UTC-6 (Central (CST))
  - Summer (DST): UTC-5 (CDT)
- FIPS code: 27-57256
- GNIS feature ID: 0665523

St. Martin Township is a township in Stearns County, Minnesota, United States. The population was 545 at the 2010 census. The township includes the City of St. Martin.

St. Martin Township was organized in 1863, and named after Martin of Tours.

== Geography ==
According to the United States Census Bureau, the township has a total area of 34.6 square miles (89.5 km^{2}); 34.4 square miles (89.1 km^{2}) is land and 0.15 square miles (0.4 km^{2}), or 0.41%, is water.

St. Martin Township is located in Township 124 North of the Arkansas Base Line and Range 32 West of the 5th Principal Meridian.

== Demographics ==
As of the census of 2000, there were 472 people, 132 households, and 118 families residing in the township. The population density was 13.7 people per square mile (5.3/km^{2}). There were 134 housing units at an average density of 3.9/sq mi (1.5/km^{2}). The racial makeup of the township was 99.79% White, 0.21% from other races. Hispanic or Latino of any race were 0.21% of the population.

There were 132 households, out of which 53.0% had children under the age of 18 living with them, 84.1% were married couples living together, 1.5% had a female householder with no husband present, and 10.6% were non-families. 9.1% of all households were made up of individuals, and 3.0% had someone living alone who was 65 years of age or older. The average household size was 3.58 and the average family size was 3.81.

In the township the population was spread out, with 36.7% under the age of 18, 7.6% from 18 to 24, 27.1% from 25 to 44, 17.6% from 45 to 64, and 11.0% who were 65 years of age or older. The median age was 32 years. For every 100 females, there were 111.7 males. For every 100 females age 18 and over, there were 121.5 males.

The median income for a household in the township was $40,000, and the median income for a family was $41,250. Males had a median income of $26,339 versus $19,135 for females. The per capita income for the township was $15,123. About 10.3% of families and 12.1% of the population were below the poverty line, including 16.0% of those under age 18 and 12.7% of those age 65 or over.
