= Crow Lake Township, Stearns County, Minnesota =

Crow Lake Township, Minnesota
- Township
- Location within the state of Minnesota Crow Lake Township, Minnesota (the United States)
- Coordinates: 45°28′15″N 95°4′34″W
- Country: United States
- State: Minnesota
- County: Stearns

Area
  - Total: 35.1 sq mi (90.9 km^{2})
  - Land: 33.7 sq mi (87.2 km^{2})
  - Water: 1.4 sq mi (3.7 km^{2})
- Elevation: 1,286 ft (392 m)

Population (2010)
  - Total: 318
  - Density: 9.45/sq mi (3.65/km^{2})
- Time zone: UTC-6 (Central (CST))
  - Summer (DST): UTC-5 (CDT)
- FIPS code: 27-14032
- GNIS feature ID: 0663898

Crow Lake Township is in Stearns County, Minnesota, United States. The population was 318 at the 2010 census.

Crow Lake Township was organized in 1868, and named after Crow Lake.

== Geography ==
According to the United States Census Bureau, the township has a total area of 35.1 square miles (91 km^{2}); 33.7 square miles (87 km^{2}) is land and 1.4 square miles (3.6 km^{2}), or 4.10%, is water.

== Demographics ==
As of the census of 2000, there were 345 people, 126 households, and 100 families residing in the township. The population density was 10.2 inhabitants per square mile (3.9/km^{2}). There were 134 housing units at an average density of 4.0 per square mile (1.5/km^{2}). The racial makeup of the township was 98.26% White, 0.29% African American, 0.87% from other races, and 0.58% from two or more races. Hispanic or Latino of any race were 0.29% of the population.

There were 126 households, out of which 37.3% had children under the age of 18 living with them, 70.6% were married couples living together, 5.6% had a female householder with no husband present, and 20.6% were non-families. 19.8% of all households were made up of individuals, and 6.3% had someone living alone who was 65 years of age or older. The average household size was 2.74 and the average family size was 3.15.

In the township the population was spread out, with 28.4% under the age of 18, 9.3% from 18 to 24, 23.2% from 25 to 44, 30.1% from 45 to 64, and 9.0% who were 65 years of age or older. The median age was 38 years. For every 100 females, there were 113.0 males. For every 100 females age 18 and over, there were 118.6 males.

The median income for a household in the township was $41,042, and the median income for a family was $50,714. Males had a median income of $27,500 versus $22,500 for females. The per capita income for the township was $19,108. About 6.0% of families and 7.8% of the population were below the poverty line, including 14.0% of those under age 18 and 8.3% of those age 65 or over.
