= Spring Hill Township, Stearns County, Minnesota =

Spring Hill Township, Minnesota
- Township
- Location within the state of Minnesota Spring Hill Township, Minnesota (the United States)
- Coordinates: 45°32′31″N 94°49′0″W
- Country: United States
- State: Minnesota
- County: Stearns

Area
  - Total: 34.9 sq mi (90.5 km^{2})
  - Land: 34.9 sq mi (90.5 km^{2})
  - Water: 0 sq mi (0 km^{2})
- Elevation: 1,204 ft (367 m)

Population (2010)
  - Total: 368
  - Density: 10.5/sq mi (4.07/km^{2})
- Time zone: UTC-6 (Central (CST))
  - Summer (DST): UTC-5 (CDT)
- FIPS code: 27-61906
- GNIS feature ID: 0665675

Spring Hill Township is a township in Stearns County, Minnesota, United States. The population was 368 at the 2010 census.

Spring Hill Township was organized in 1871, and was so named on account of the springs and hills within its borders.

== Geography ==
According to the United States Census Bureau, the township has a total area of 34.9 square miles (90.5 km^{2}), all land.

Spring Hill Township is located in Township 124 North of the Arkansas Base Line and Range 33 West of the 5th Principal Meridian.

== Demographics ==
As of the census of 2000, there were 438 people, 128 households, and 109 families residing in the township. The population density was 12.6 people per square mile (4.9/km^{2}). There were 131 housing units at an average density of 3.8/sq mi (1.5/km^{2}). The racial makeup of the township was 100.00% White.

There were 128 households, out of which 49.2% had children under the age of 18 living with them, 81.3% were married couples living together, 2.3% had a female householder with no husband present, and 14.1% were non-families. 11.7% of all households were made up of individuals, and 5.5% had someone living alone who was 65 years of age or older. The average household size was 3.42 and the average family size was 3.76.

In the township the population was spread out, with 36.3% under the age of 18, 8.7% from 18 to 24, 28.8% from 25 to 44, 19.2% from 45 to 64, and 7.1% who were 65 years of age or older. The median age was 30 years. For every 100 females, there were 136.8 males. For every 100 females age 18 and over, there were 113.0 males.

The median income for a household in the township was $41,406, and the median income for a family was $42,917. Males had a median income of $24,375 versus $21,429 for females. The per capita income for the township was $12,267. About 9.7% of families and 14.8% of the population were below the poverty line, including 22.2% of those under age 18 and 8.3% of those age 65 or over.
