= Ashley Township, Minnesota =

- Township
- Location within the state of Minnesota Ashley Township, Minnesota (the United States)
- Coordinates: 45°43′58″N 95°4′26″W
- Country: United States
- State: Minnesota
- County: Stearns

Area
  - Total: 42.0 sq mi (108.9 km^{2})
  - Land: 41.9 sq mi (108.6 km^{2})
  - Water: 0.12 sq mi (0.3 km^{2})
- Elevation: 1,342 ft (409 m)

Population (2010)
  - Total: 262
  - Density: 6.25/sq mi (2.41/km^{2})
- Time zone: UTC-6 (Central (CST))
  - Summer (DST): UTC-5 (CDT)
- FIPS code: 27-02530
- GNIS feature ID: 0663468

Ashley Township is a township in Stearns County, Minnesota, United States. The population was 262 at the 2010 census.

Ashley Township was organized in 1870, and named after Ashley Creek.

== Geography ==
According to the United States Census Bureau, the township has a total area of 42.1 square miles (109 km^{2}); 41.9 square miles (109 km^{2}) is land and 0.1 square miles (0.26 km^{2}), or 0.26%, is water.

== Demographics ==
As of the census of 2000, there were 244 people, 84 households, and 67 families residing in the township. The population density was 5.8 people per square mile (2.2/km^{2}). There were 90 housing units at an average density of 2.1/sq mi (0.8/km^{2}). The racial makeup of the township was 100.00% White.

There were 84 households, out of which 36.9% had children under the age of 18 living with them, 77.4% were married couples living together, and 20.2% were non-families. 13.1% of all households were made up of individuals, and 6.0% had someone living alone who was 65 years of age or older. The average household size was 2.90 and the average family size was 3.28.

In the township the population was spread out, with 29.1% under the age of 18, 8.2% from 18 to 24, 26.2% from 25 to 44, 20.1% from 45 to 64, and 16.4% who were 65 years of age or older. The median age was 38 years. For every 100 females, there were 117.9 males. For every 100 females age 18 and over, there were 116.3 males.

The median income for a household in the township was $45,179, and the median income for a family was $46,875. Males had a median income of $30,625 versus $20,000 for females. The per capita income for the township was $15,347. About 6.5% of families and 8.3% of the population were below the poverty line, including 12.5% of those under the age of eighteen and 5.4% of those sixty five or over.
