= Sauk Centre Township, Stearns County, Minnesota =

Sauk Centre Township, Minnesota
- Township
- Location within the state of Minnesota Sauk Centre Township, Minnesota (the United States)
- Coordinates: 45°43′49″N 94°56′20″W
- Country: United States
- State: Minnesota
- County: Stearns

Area
  - Total: 37.8 sq mi (97.9 km^{2})
  - Land: 35.9 sq mi (92.9 km^{2})
  - Water: 1.9 sq mi (5.0 km^{2})
- Elevation: 1,273 ft (388 m)

Population (2010)
  - Total: 1,088
  - Density: 30.3/sq mi (11.7/km^{2})
- Time zone: UTC-6 (Central (CST))
  - Summer (DST): UTC-5 (CDT)
- ZIP code: 56378
- Area code: 320
- FIPS code: 27-58666
- GNIS feature ID: 0665558

Sauk Centre Township is a township in Stearns County, Minnesota, United States. The population was 1,088 at the 2010 census. The township was settled in 1856 and organized in 1858.

== Geography ==
According to the United States Census Bureau, the township has a total area of 37.8 square miles (97.9 km^{2}); 35.9 square miles (92.9 km^{2}) is land and 1.9 square miles (5.0 km^{2}), or 5.16%, is water.

It entirely surrounds the city of Sauk Centre.

== Demographics ==
As of the census of 2000, there were 996 people, 344 households, and 278 families residing in the township. The population density was 27.5 inhabitants per square mile (10.6/km^{2}). There were 385 housing units at an average density of 10.6/sq mi (4.1/km^{2}). The racial makeup of the township was 99.30% White, 0.10% African American, 0.30% Native American, 0.10% from other races, and 0.20% from two or more races. Hispanic or Latino of any race were 0.60% of the population.

There were 344 households, out of which 37.8% had children under the age of 18 living with them, 70.9% were married couples living together, 7.0% had a female householder with no husband present, and 18.9% were non-families. 14.2% of all households were made up of individuals, and 5.8% had someone living alone who was 65 years of age or older. The average household size was 2.90 and the average family size was 3.19.

In the township the population was spread out, with 29.2% under the age of 18, 8.4% from 18 to 24, 27.0% from 25 to 44, 23.5% from 45 to 64, and 11.8% who were 65 years of age or older. The median age was 36 years. For every 100 females, there were 101.2 males. For every 100 females age 18 and over, there were 106.1 males.

The median income for a household in the township was $43,365, and the median income for a family was $48,452. Males had a median income of $32,448 versus $20,119 for females. The per capita income for the township was $18,905. About 5.3% of families and 5.7% of the population were below the poverty line, including 3.4% of those under age 18 and 16.3% of those age 65 or over.
