= Eden Lake Township, Stearns County, Minnesota =

Eden Lake Township, Minnesota
- Township
- Location within the state of Minnesota Eden Lake Township, Minnesota (the United States)
- Coordinates: 45°22′N 94°34′W
- Country: United States
- State: Minnesota
- County: Stearns

Area
  - Total: 38.6 sq mi (99.9 km^{2})
  - Land: 33.8 sq mi (87.6 km^{2})
  - Water: 4.7 sq mi (12.3 km^{2})
- Elevation: 1,211 ft (369 m)

Population (2010)
  - Total: 1,542
  - Density: 45.6/sq mi (17.6/km^{2})
- Time zone: UTC-6 (Central (CST))
  - Summer (DST): UTC-5 (CDT)
- FIPS code: 27-18098
- GNIS feature ID: 0664044

Eden Lake Township is a township in Stearns County, Minnesota, United States. The population was 1,542 at the 2010 census.

Eden Lake Township was organized in 1867.

== Geography ==
According to the United States Census Bureau, the township has a total area of 38.6 square miles (100 km^{2}); 33.8 square miles (88 km^{2}) is land and 4.8 square miles (12 km^{2}), or 12.32%, is water.

Eden Lake Township is located in Township 122 North of the Arkansas Base Line and Range 31 West of the 5th Principal Meridian.

== Demographics ==
As of the census of 2000, there were 1,526 people, 532 households, and 425 families residing in the township. The population density was 45.1 inhabitants per square mile (17.4/km^{2}). There were 773 housing units at an average density of 22.9 per square mile (8.8/km^{2}). The racial makeup of the township was 98.62% White, 0.20% African American, 0.13% Native American, 0.13% Asian, 0.07% Pacific Islander, 0.46% from other races, and 0.39% from two or more races. Hispanic or Latino of any race were 0.52% of the population.

There were 532 households, out of which 37.8% had children under the age of 18 living with them, 73.7% were married couples living together, 3.8% had a female householder with no husband present, and 20.1% were non-families. 16.0% of all households were made up of individuals, and 5.8% had someone living alone who was 65 years of age or older. The average household size was 2.87 and the average family size was 3.22.

In the township the population was spread out, with 28.3% under the age of 18, 7.7% from 18 to 24, 27.8% from 25 to 44, 25.0% from 45 to 64, and 11.2% who were 65 years of age or older. The median age was 37 years. For every 100 females, there were 110.8 males. For every 100 females age 18 and over, there were 114.9 males.

The median income for a household in the township was $48,295, and the median income for a family was $51,250. Males had a median income of $34,226 versus $22,180 for females. The per capita income for the township was $17,727. About 4.5% of families and 5.9% of the population were below the poverty line, including 6.7% of those under age 18 and 4.1% of those age 65 or over.
