= Getty Township, Stearns County, Minnesota =

Getty Township, Minnesota
- Township
- Location within the state of Minnesota Getty Township, Minnesota (the United States)
- Coordinates: 45°38′N 94°57′W
- Country: United States
- State: Minnesota
- County: Stearns

Area
  - Total: 36.2 sq mi (93.7 km^{2})
  - Land: 35.7 sq mi (92.5 km^{2})
  - Water: 0.42 sq mi (1.1 km^{2})
- Elevation: 1,299 ft (396 m)

Population (2010)
  - Total: 376
  - Density: 10.5/sq mi (4.06/km^{2})
- Time zone: UTC-6 (Central (CST))
  - Summer (DST): UTC-5 (CDT)
- FIPS code: 27-23606
- GNIS feature ID: 0664264

Getty Township is a township in Stearns County, Minnesota, United States. The population was 376 at the 2010 census.

Getty Township was organized in 1865, and named for John J. Getty, a pioneer settler.

== Geography ==
According to the United States Census Bureau, the township has a total area of 36.2 square miles (93.7 km^{2}); 35.7 square miles (92.5 km^{2}) is land and 0.42 square miles (1.1 km^{2}), or 1.19%, is water.

== Demographics ==
As of the census of 2000, there were 405 people, 116 households, and 99 families residing in the township. The population density was 11.2 inhabitants per square mile (4.3/km^{2}). There were 119 housing units at an average density of 3.3 per square mile (1.3/km^{2}). The racial makeup of the township was 98.27% White, 0.25% African American, 0.25% Native American, 0.49% Asian, 0.25% Pacific Islander, and 0.49% from two or more races. Hispanic or Latino of any race were 0.25% of the population.

There were 116 households, out of which 48.3% had children under the age of 18 living with them, 75.0% were married couples living together, 1.7% had a female householder with no husband present, and 13.8% were non-families. 11.2% of all households were made up of individuals, and 4.3% had someone living alone who was 65 years of age or older. The average household size was 3.49 and the average family size was 3.78.

In the township the population was spread out, with 36.8% under the age of 18, 7.9% from 18 to 24, 26.9% from 25 to 44, 21.0% from 45 to 64, and 7.4% who were 65 years of age or older. The median age was 32 years. For every 100 females, there were 107.7 males. For every 100 females age 18 and over, there were 118.8 males.

The median income for a household in the township was $43,839, and the median income for a family was $44,643. Males had a median income of $26,250 versus $20,385 for females. The per capita income for the township was $13,948. About 3.9% of families and 3.1% of the population were below the poverty line, including 2.4% of those under age 18 and 5.4% of those age 65 or over.
