= St. Rosa, Minnesota =

City in Minnesota, United States

Saint Rosa, Minnesota
- City
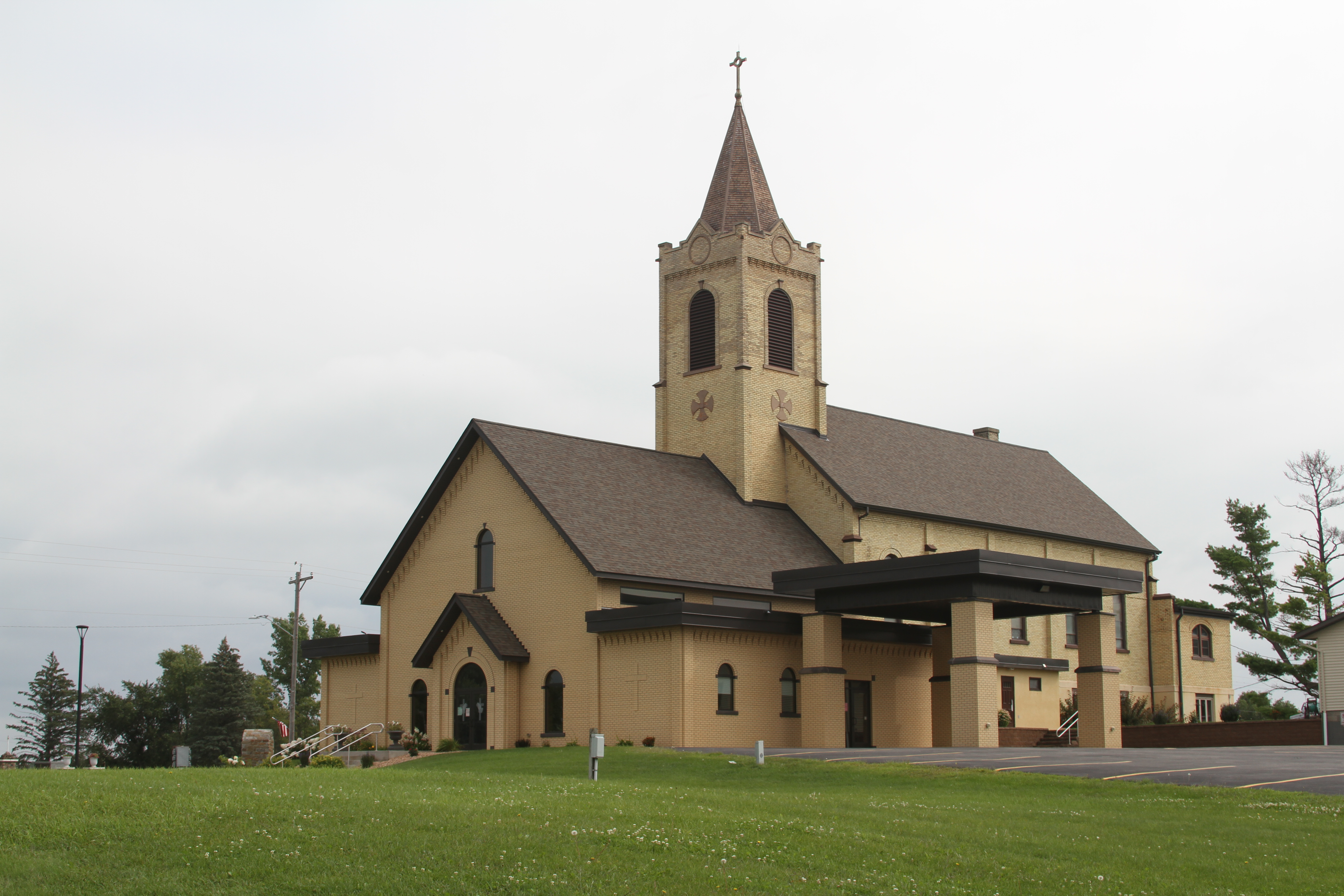
- Saint Rose of Lima Catholic Church

- Location of Saint Rosa within Stearns County, Minnesota
- Coordinates: 45°43′43″N 94°42′58″W
- Country: United States
- State: Minnesota
- County: Stearns
- Founded: 1904
- Incorporated: August 9, 1939

Government
  - Mayor: John Arnzen

Area
  - Total: 0.373 sq mi (0.967 km^{2})
  - Land: 0.368 sq mi (0.953 km^{2})
  - Water: 0.0054 sq mi (0.014 km^{2})
- Elevation: 1,280 ft (390 m)

Population (2020)
  - Total: 58
  - Estimate (2022): 55
  - Density: 157.7/sq mi (60.87/km^{2})
- Time zone: UTC−6 (Central (CST))
  - Summer (DST): UTC−5 (CDT)
- ZIP Code: 56331
- Area code: 320
- FIPS code: 27-58072
- GNIS feature ID: 2396520
- Sales tax: 7.125%

Saint Rosa is a city in Stearns County, Minnesota, United States. The population was 58 at the 2020 census. It is part of the St. Cloud Metropolitan Statistical Area.

== Geography ==
According to the United States Census Bureau, the city has a total area of 0.373 square miles (0.97 km^{2}); 0.368 square miles (0.95 km^{2}) is land and 0.005 square miles (0.01 km^{2}) is water.

Saint Rosa is located near the junction of Stearns County Roads 17 and 167, and 421st Street. Nearby places include Freeport, Melrose, and St. Anthony.

== Demographics ==
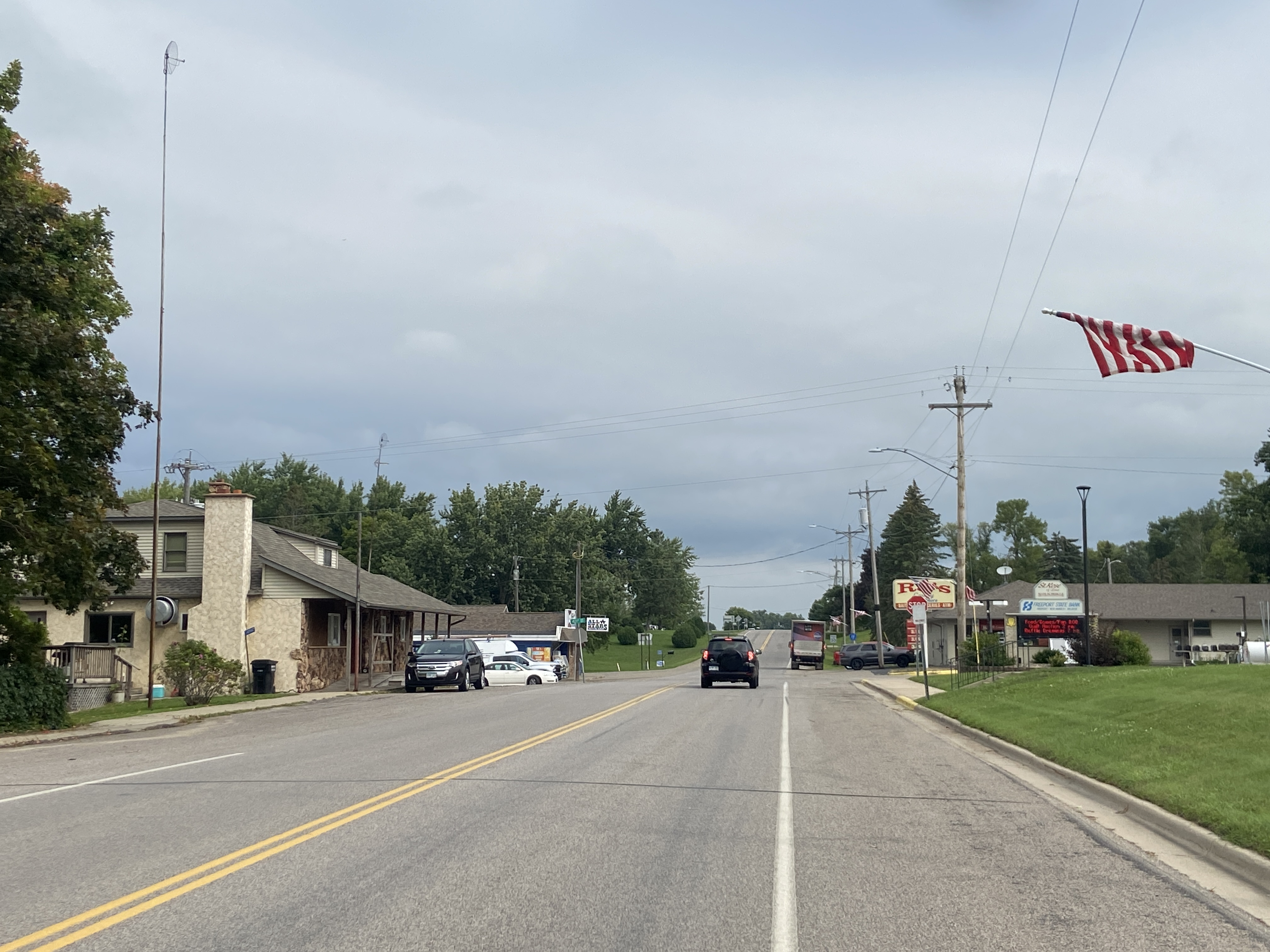
Cnty Rd 17 at 421st Street

Historical population
Census	Pop.	Note	%±
1950	69		—
1960	62		−10.1%
1970	93		50.0%
1980	77		−17.2%
1990	75		−2.6%
2000	44		−41.3%
2010	68		54.5%
2020	58		−14.7%
2022 (est.)	55		−5.2%
U.S. Decennial Census; 2020 Census

=== 2010 census ===
As of the 2010 census, there were 68 people, 29 households, and 17 families living in the city. The population density was 178.9 inhabitants per square mile (69.1/km^{2}). There were 31 housing units at an average density of 81.6 per square mile (31.5/km^{2}). The racial makeup of the city was 100.0% White.

There were 29 households, of which 31.0% had children under the age of 18 living with them, 51.7% were married couples living together, 3.4% had a female householder with no husband present, 3.4% had a male householder with no wife present, and 41.4% were non-families. 41.4% of all households were made up of individuals, and 10.3% had someone living alone who was 65 years of age or older. The average household size was 2.34 and the average family size was 3.18.

The median age in the city was 38.8 years. 26.5% of residents were under the age of 18; 3% were between the ages of 18 and 24; 29.4% were from 25 to 44; 25% were from 45 to 64; and 16.2% were 65 years of age or older. The gender makeup of the city was 51.5% male and 48.5% female.

=== 2000 census ===
As of the 2000 census, there were 44 people, 16 households, and 12 families living in the city. The population density was 118.0 inhabitants per square mile (45.6/km^{2}). There were 16 housing units at an average density of 42.9 per square mile (16.6/km^{2}). The racial makeup of the city was 97.73% White, and 2.27% from two or more races.

There were 16 households, out of which 50.0% had children under the age of 18 living with them, 68.8% were married couples living together, and 25.0% were non-families. 25.0% of all households were made up of individuals, and 12.5% had someone living alone who was 65 years of age or older. The average household size was 2.75 and the average family size was 3.33.

In the city, the population was spread out, with 34.1% under the age of 18, 6.8% from 18 to 24, 40.9% from 25 to 44, 9.1% from 45 to 64, and 9.1% who were 65 years of age or older. The median age was 28 years. For every 100 females, there were 131.6 males. For every 100 females age 18 and over, there were 141.7 males.

The median income for a household in the city was $48,125, and the median income for a family was $43,438. Males had a median income of $28,750 versus $70,000 for females. The per capita income for the city was $28,282. None of the population and none of the families were below the poverty line.
