= Raymond Township, Stearns County, Minnesota =

Raymond Township, Minnesota
- Township
- Location within the state of Minnesota Raymond Township, Minnesota (the United States)
- Coordinates: 45°37′36″N 95°4′24″W
- Country: United States
- State: Minnesota
- County: Stearns

Area
  - Total: 36.1 sq mi (93.6 km^{2})
  - Land: 36.0 sq mi (93.2 km^{2})
  - Water: 0.15 sq mi (0.4 km^{2})
- Elevation: 1,352 ft (412 m)

Population (2020 United States census)
  - Total: 227
  - Density: 6.31/sq mi (2.44/km^{2})
- Time zone: UTC-6 (Central (CST))
  - Summer (DST): UTC-5 (CDT)
- FIPS code: 27-53314
- GNIS feature ID: 0665383

Raymond Township is a township in Stearns County, Minnesota, United States. The population was 227 at the 2022 census.

== History ==
Raymond Township was organized in 1867, and named for Liberty B. Raymond, a pioneer settler.

== Geography ==
According to the United States Census Bureau, the township has a total area of 36.1 square miles (93.6 km^{2}); 36.0 square miles (93.2 km^{2}) is land and 0.15 square miles (0.4 km^{2}), or 0.47%, is water.

== Demographics ==
As of the census of 2000, there were 255 people, 72 households, and 57 families residing in the township. The population density was 7.1 people per square mile (2.7/km^{2}). There were 78 housing units at an average density of 2.2/sq mi (0.8/km^{2}). The racial makeup of the township was 96.86% White, 0.39% African American, and 2.75% from two or more races. Hispanic or Latino of any race were 1.57% of the population.

There were 72 households, out of which 51.4% had children under the age of 18 living with them, 70.8% were married couples living together, 2.8% had a female householder with no husband present, and 20.8% were non-families. 20.8% of all households were made up of individuals, and 11.1% had someone living alone who was 65 years of age or older. The average household size was 3.54, and the average family size was 4.11.

In the township the population was spread out, with 45.1% under the age of 18, 3.9% from 18 to 24, 23.5% from 25 to 44, 22.0% from 45 to 64, and 5.5% who were 65 years of age or older. The median age was 26 years. For every 100 females, there were 110.7 males. For every 100 females age 18 and over, there were 122.2 males.

The median income for a household in the township was $30,000, and the median income for a family was $31,094. Males had a median income of $25,938 versus $18,750 for females. The per capita income for the township was $15,223. About 11.9% of families and 16.7% of the population were below the poverty line, including 22.9% of those under the age of eighteen and none of those 65 or over.
