= Lake George Township, Stearns County, Minnesota =

Lake George Township, Minnesota
- Township
- Location within the state of Minnesota Lake George Township, Minnesota (the United States)
- Coordinates: 45°32′59″N 94°56′13″W
- Country: United States
- State: Minnesota
- County: Stearns

Area
  - Total: 35.4 sq mi (91.6 km^{2})
  - Land: 34.6 sq mi (89.7 km^{2})
  - Water: 0.73 sq mi (1.9 km^{2})
- Elevation: 1,299 ft (396 m)

Population (2010)
  - Total: 335
  - Density: 9.67/sq mi (3.73/km^{2})
- Time zone: UTC-6 (Central (CST))
  - Summer (DST): UTC-5 (CDT)
- FIPS code: 27-34406
- GNIS feature ID: 0664676

Lake George Township is a township in Stearns County, Minnesota, United States. The population was 335 at the 2010 census.

Lake George Township was organized in 1877, and named after a lake which bears the name of George Kraemer, an early settler.

== Geography ==
According to the United States Census Bureau, the township has a total area of 35.3 square miles (91 km^{2}); 34.6 square miles (90 km^{2}) is land and 0.7 square miles (1.8 km^{2}), or 2.04%, is water.

== Demographics ==
As of the census of 2000, there were 371 people, 113 households, and 95 families residing in the township. The population density was 10.7 inhabitants per square mile (4.1/km^{2}). There were 116 housing units at an average density of 3.3 per square mile (1.3/km^{2}). The racial makeup of the township was 100.00% White.

There were 113 households, out of which 47.8% had children under the age of 18 living with them, 76.1% were married couples living together, 1.8% had a female householder with no husband present, and 15.9% were non-families. 15.0% of all households were made up of individuals, and 5.3% had someone living alone who was 65 years of age or older. The average household size was 3.28 and the average family size was 3.69.

In the township the population was spread out, with 38.0% under the age of 18, 5.9% from 18 to 24, 29.4% from 25 to 44, 17.0% from 45 to 64, and 9.7% who were 65 years of age or older. The median age was 31 years. For every 100 females, there were 123.5 males. For every 100 females age 18 and over, there were 132.3 males.

The median income for a household in the township was $36,029, and the median income for a family was $37,232. Males had a median income of $25,469 versus $15,750 for females. The per capita income for the township was $13,662. About 12.4% of families and 18.5% of the population were below the poverty line, including 30.1% of those under age 18 and 6.7% of those age 65 or over.
