= Melrose Township, Stearns County, Minnesota =

Melrose Township, Minnesota
- Township
- Location within the state of Minnesota Melrose Township, Minnesota (the United States)
- Coordinates: 45°43′N 94°50′W
- Country: United States
- State: Minnesota
- County: Stearns

Area
  - Total: 40.0 sq mi (103.6 km^{2})
  - Land: 39.3 sq mi (101.8 km^{2})
  - Water: 0.66 sq mi (1.7 km^{2})
- Elevation: 1,260 ft (384 m)

Population (2010)
  - Total: 759
  - Density: 19.3/sq mi (7.46/km^{2})
- Time zone: UTC-6 (Central (CST))
  - Summer (DST): UTC-5 (CDT)
- ZIP code: 56352
- Area code: 320
- FIPS code: 27-41588
- GNIS feature ID: 0664954

Melrose Township is a township in Stearns County, Minnesota, United States. The population was 759 at the 2010 census. The township includes the northern two-thirds of the City of Melrose.

== History ==
The area of Melrose Township was first settled in the 1840s and was formally founded in 1866. The township's name is a portmanteau of Melissa and Rose, the names of two local pioneer women.

== Geography ==
According to the United States Census Bureau, the township has a total area of 40.0 square miles (103.6 km^{2}); 39.3 square miles (101.8 km^{2}) is land and 0.66 square miles (1.7 km^{2}), or 1.66%, is water.

Melrose Township is located in Township 126 North of the Arkansas Base Line and Range 33 West of the 5th Principal Meridian.

== Demographics ==
At the 2000 census, there were 772 people, 255 households and 207 families residing in the township. The population density was 19.5 per square mile (7.5/km^{2}). There were 281 housing units at an average density of 7.1/sq mi (2.7/km^{2}). The racial makeup of the township was 99.09% White, 0.13% Native American, 0.26% Asian, 0.39% from other races, and 0.13% from two or more races. Hispanic or Latino of any race were 0.39% of the population.

There were 255 households, of which 42.0% had children under the age of 18 living with them, 73.3% were married couples living together, 2.4% had a female householder with no husband present, and 18.8% were non-families. 14.9% of all households were made up of individuals, and 7.5% had someone living alone who was 65 years of age or older. The average household size was 3.03 and the average family size was 3.41.

Age distribution was 31.0% under the age of 18, 7.8% from 18 to 24, 27.3% from 25 to 44, 19.3% from 45 to 64, and 14.6% who were 65 years of age or older. The median age was 36 years. For every 100 females, there were 111.5 males. For every 100 females age 18 and over, there were 121.2 males.

The median household income was $42,589, and the median family income was $45,865. Males had a median income of $28,571 versus $22,396 for females. The per capita income for the township was $16,462. About 3.9% of families and 5.7% of the population were below the poverty line, including 5.8% of those under age 18 and 5.7% of those age 65 or over.
