= Lake Henry Township, Stearns County, Minnesota =

Lake Henry Township, Minnesota
- Township
- Location within the state of Minnesota Lake Henry Township, Minnesota (the United States)
- Coordinates: 45°27′49″N 94°49′58″W
- Country: United States
- State: Minnesota
- County: Stearns

Area
  - Total: 35.6 sq mi (92.1 km^{2})
  - Land: 35.4 sq mi (91.8 km^{2})
  - Water: 0.12 sq mi (0.3 km^{2})
- Elevation: 1,283 ft (391 m)

Population (2010)
  - Total: 278
  - Density: 7.84/sq mi (3.03/km^{2})
- Time zone: UTC-6 (Central (CST))
  - Summer (DST): UTC-5 (CDT)
- FIPS code: 27-34496
- GNIS feature ID: 0664681

Lake Henry Township is a township in Stearns County, Minnesota, United States. The population was 278 at the 2010 census.

Lake Henry Township was organized in 1869.

== Geography ==
According to the United States Census Bureau, the township has a total area of 35.6 square miles (92 km^{2}); 35.5 square miles (92 km^{2}) is land and 0.1 square miles (0.26 km^{2}), or 0.31%, is water.

Lake Henry Township is located in Township 123 North of the Arkansas Base Line and Range 33 West of the 5th Principal Meridian.

== Demographics ==
As of the census of 2000, there were 330 people, 101 households, and 83 families residing in the township. The population density was 9.3 inhabitants per square mile (3.6/km^{2}). There were 103 housing units at an average density of 2.9 per square mile (1.1/km^{2}). The racial makeup of the township was 100.00% White.

There were 101 households, out of which 38.6% had children under the age of 18 living with them, 76.2% were married couples living together, 1.0% had a female householder with no husband present, and 17.8% were non-families. 14.9% of all households were made up of individuals, and 5.9% had someone living alone who was 65 years of age or older. The average household size was 3.27 and the average family size was 3.67.

In the township the population was spread out, with 31.8% under the age of 18, 8.2% from 18 to 24, 28.5% from 25 to 44, 24.5% from 45 to 64, and 7.0% who were 65 years of age or older. The median age was 35 years. For every 100 females, there were 121.5 males. For every 100 females age 18 and over, there were 134.4 males.

The median income for a household in the township was $42,188, and the median income for a family was $47,500. Males had a median income of $29,250 versus $21,250 for females. The per capita income for the township was $15,036. About 6.4% of families and 4.7% of the population were below the poverty line, including 3.8% of those under age 18 and none of those age 65 or over.
