= Holding Township, Stearns County, Minnesota =

Holding Township, Minnesota
- Township
- Location within the state of Minnesota Holding Township, Minnesota (the United States)
- Coordinates: 45°43′N 94°28′W
- Country: United States
- State: Minnesota
- County: Stearns

Area
  - Total: 41.8 sq mi (108.2 km^{2})
  - Land: 41.1 sq mi (106.4 km^{2})
  - Water: 0.73 sq mi (1.9 km^{2})
- Elevation: 1,155 ft (352 m)

Population (2010)
  - Total: 1,139
  - Density: 27.73/sq mi (10.70/km^{2})
- Time zone: UTC-6 (Central (CST))
  - Summer (DST): UTC-5 (CDT)
- FIPS code: 27-29564
- GNIS feature ID: 0664495
- Website: https://holdingtownshipmn.gov/

Holding Township is a township in Stearns County, Minnesota, United States. It includes the city of Holdingford. The township population was 1,139 at the 2010 census.

== History ==
Holding Township was organized in 1867, and named for Randolph Holding, an early settler and afterward state legislator.

== Geography ==
According to the United States Census Bureau, the township has a total area of 41.8 square miles (108 km^{2}); 41.1 square miles (106 km^{2}) is land and 0.7 square miles (1.8 km^{2}), or 1.72%, is water.

Holding Township is located in Township 126 North of the Arkansas Base Line and Range 30 West of the 5th Principal Meridian.

== Demographics ==
As of the census of 2000, there were 1,147 people, 361 households, and 303 families residing in the township. The population density was 27.9 inhabitants per square mile (10.8/km^{2}). There were 393 housing units at an average density of 9.6 per square mile (3.7/km^{2}). The racial makeup of the township was 99.48% White, 0.17% Native American, 0.09% Asian, and 0.26% from two or more races.

There were 361 households, out of which 44.0% had children under the age of 18 living with them, 76.2% were married couples living together, 2.5% had a female householder with no husband present, and 15.8% were non-families. 13.6% of all households were made up of individuals, and 7.5% had someone living alone who was 65 years of age or older. The average household size was 3.11 and the average family size was 3.43.

In the township the population was spread out, with 31.0% under the age of 18, 8.6% from 18 to 24, 29.5% from 25 to 44, 20.2% from 45 to 64, and 10.6% who were 65 years of age or older. The median age was 34 years. For every 100 females, there were 106.7 males. For every 100 females age 18 and over, there were 107.6 males.

The median income for a household in the township was $42,212, and the median income for a family was $45,526. Males had a median income of $31,905 versus $21,033 for females. The per capita income for the township was $14,879. About 7.7% of families and 11.3% of the population were below the poverty line, including 11.0% of those under age 18 and 9.4% of those age 65 or over.
