= Albany Township, Stearns County, Minnesota =

Albany Township, Minnesota
- Township
- Location within the state of Minnesota Albany Township, Minnesota (the United States)
- Coordinates: 45°38′N 94°35′W
- Country: United States
- State: Minnesota
- County: Stearns

Area
  - Total: 36.6 sq mi (94.9 km^{2})
  - Land: 36.4 sq mi (94.3 km^{2})
  - Water: 0.27 sq mi (0.7 km^{2})
- Elevation: 1,191 ft (363 m)

Population (2010)
  - Total: 980
  - Density: 27/sq mi (10/km^{2})
- Time zone: UTC-6 (Central (CST))
  - Summer (DST): UTC-5 (CDT)
- ZIP code: 56307
- Area code: 320
- FIPS code: 27-00640
- GNIS feature ID: 0663398

Albany Township (/ˈɔːlbəni/ AWL-bə-nee) is a township in Stearns County, Minnesota, United States. The population was 980 at the 2010 census. The city of Albany is surrounded by the township.

Albany Township was organized in 1868.

== Geography ==
According to the United States Census Bureau, the township (T125N R31W) has a total area of 36.6 square miles (94.9 km^{2}); 36.4 square miles (94.3 km^{2}) is land and 0.27 square miles (0.7 km^{2}), or 0.71%, is water.

Albany Township is located in Township 125 North of the Arkansas Base Line and Range 31 West of the 5th Principal Meridian.

== Demographics ==
As of the census of 2000, there were 884 people, 281 households, and 245 families residing in the township. The population density was 23.8 people per square mile (9.2/km^{2}). There were 289 housing units at an average density of 7.8/sq mi (3.0/km^{2}). The racial makeup of the township was 98.64% White, 0.11% African American, 0.23% Asian, 0.45% from other races, and 0.57% from two or more races. Hispanic or Latino of any race were 0.23% of the population.

There were 281 households, out of which 47.7% had children under the age of 18 living with them, 79.7% were married couples living together, 3.2% had a female householder with no husband present, and 12.5% were non-families. 10.7% of all households were made up of individuals, and 2.8% had someone living alone who was 65 years of age or older. The average household size was 3.13 and the average family size was 3.39.

In the township the population was spread out, with 32.0% under the age of 18, 7.8% from 18 to 24, 26.1% from 25 to 44, 24.4% from 45 to 64, and 9.6% who were 65 years of age or older. The median age was 35 years. For every 100 females, there were 109.0 males. For every 100 females age 18 and over, there were 113.1 males.

The median income for a household in the township was $47,656, and the median income for a family was $52,750. Males had a median income of $32,917 versus $22,396 for females. The per capita income for the township was $16,572. About 5.1% of families and 6.8% of the population were below the poverty line, including 5.8% of those under age 18 and 7.7% of those age 65 or over.
