= Grove Township, Stearns County, Minnesota =

Grove Township, Minnesota
- Township
- Location within the state of Minnesota Grove Township, Minnesota (the United States)
- Coordinates: 45°38′N 94°50′W
- Country: United States
- State: Minnesota
- County: Stearns

Area
  - Total: 33.7 sq mi (87.4 km^{2})
  - Land: 33.3 sq mi (86.2 km^{2})
  - Water: 0.50 sq mi (1.3 km^{2})
- Elevation: 1,296 ft (395 m)

Population (2010)
  - Total: 493
  - Density: 14.8/sq mi (5.72/km^{2})
- Time zone: UTC-6 (Central (CST))
  - Summer (DST): UTC-5 (CDT)
- FIPS code: 27-26090
- GNIS feature ID: 0664358

Grove Township is a township in Stearns County, Minnesota, United States. The population was 493 at the 2010 census. The township includes the southern one-third of the City of Melrose and the City of Greenwald.

Grove Township was organized in 1867.

== Geography ==
According to the United States Census Bureau, the township has a total area of 33.8 square miles (88 km^{2}); 33.3 square miles (86 km^{2}) is land and 0.5 square miles (1.3 km^{2}), or 1.45%, is water.

Grove Township is located in Township 125 North of the Arkansas Base Line and Range 33 West of the 5th Principal Meridian.

== Demographics ==
As of the census of 2000, there were 505 people, 158 households, and 137 families residing in the township. The population density was 15.2 inhabitants per square mile (5.9/km^{2}). There were 160 housing units at an average density of 4.8 per square mile (1.9/km^{2}). The racial makeup of the township was 99.80% White, and 0.20% from two or more races.

There were 158 households, out of which 51.3% had children under the age of 18 living with them, 80.4% were married couples living together, 3.2% had a female householder with no husband present, and 12.7% were non-families. 12.0% of all households were made up of individuals, and 3.8% had someone living alone who was 65 years of age or older. The average household size was 3.20 and the average family size was 3.49.

In the township the population was spread out, with 34.7% under the age of 18, 5.3% from 18 to 24, 30.1% from 25 to 44, 23.6% from 45 to 64, and 6.3% who were 65 years of age or older. The median age was 35 years. For every 100 females, there were 117.7 males. For every 100 females age 18 and over, there were 107.5 males.

The median income for a household in the township was $45,750, and the median income for a family was $50,250. Males had a median income of $37,125 versus $20,000 for females. The per capita income for the township was $18,533. About 11.6% of families and 12.6% of the population were below the poverty line, including 15.3% of those under age 18 and 12.5% of those age 65 or over.
