= North Fork Township, Stearns County, Minnesota =

North Fork Township, Minnesota
- Township
- Location within the state of Minnesota North Fork Township, Minnesota (the United States)
- Coordinates: 45°32′33″N 95°3′54″W
- Country: United States
- State: Minnesota
- County: Stearns

Area
  - Total: 34.8 sq mi (90.1 km^{2})
  - Land: 34.8 sq mi (90.1 km^{2})
  - Water: 0 sq mi (0.0 km^{2})
- Elevation: 1,289 ft (393 m)

Population (2010)
  - Total: 247
  - Density: 7.10/sq mi (2.74/km^{2})
- Time zone: UTC-6 (Central (CST))
  - Summer (DST): UTC-5 (CDT)
- FIPS code: 27-46960
- GNIS feature ID: 0665156

North Fork Township is a township in Stearns County, Minnesota, United States. The population was 247 at the 2010 census.

North Fork Township was organized in 1867, and named after the North Fork Crow River.

== Geography ==
According to the United States Census Bureau, the township has a total area of 34.8 square miles (90.1 km^{2}), all land.

== Demographics ==
As of the census of 2000, there were 253 people, 87 households, and 64 families residing in the township. The population density was 7.3 people per square mile (2.8/km^{2}). There were 92 housing units at an average density of 2.6/sq mi (1.0/km^{2}). The racial makeup of the township was 98.81% White, and 1.19% from two or more races. Hispanic or Latino of any race were 0.40% of the population.

There were 87 households, out of which 40.2% had children under the age of 18 living with them, 67.8% were married couples living together, 3.4% had a female householder with no husband present, and 26.4% were non-families. 20.7% of all households were made up of individuals, and 8.0% had someone living alone who was 65 years of age or older. The average household size was 2.86 and the average family size was 3.38.

In the township the population was spread out, with 32.4% under the age of 18, 4.3% from 18 to 24, 28.5% from 25 to 44, 22.1% from 45 to 64, and 12.6% who were 65 years of age or older. The median age was 36 years. For every 100 females, there were 112.6 males. For every 100 females age 18 and over, there were 111.1 males.

The median income for a household in the township was $30,000, and the median income for a family was $33,750. Males had a median income of $17,083 versus $23,750 for females. The per capita income for the township was $13,326. About 10.8% of families and 15.2% of the population were below the poverty line, including 19.3% of those under the age of eighteen and 13.9% of those 65 or over.
