= Paynesville Township, Stearns County, Minnesota =

Paynesville Township, Minnesota
- Township
- Location within the state of Minnesota Paynesville Township, Minnesota (the United States)
- Coordinates: 45°22′N 94°42′W
- Country: United States
- State: Minnesota
- County: Stearns

Area
  - Total: 33.5 sq mi (86.8 km^{2})
  - Land: 29.0 sq mi (75.1 km^{2})
  - Water: 4.5 sq mi (11.7 km^{2})
- Elevation: 1,240 ft (378 m)

Population (2010)
  - Total: 1,421
  - Density: 49.0/sq mi (18.9/km^{2})
- Time zone: UTC-6 (Central (CST))
  - Summer (DST): UTC-5 (CDT)
- ZIP code: 56362
- Area code: 320
- FIPS code: 27-49984
- GNIS feature ID: 0665266
- Website: https://www.paynesvilletownship.com/

Paynesville Township is a township in Stearns County, Minnesota, United States. The population was 1,421 at the 2010 census.

Paynesville Township was originally called New Paynesville Township, and under the latter name was organized in 1890.

== Geography ==
According to the United States Census Bureau, the township has a total area of 33.5 square miles (86.8 km^{2}); 29.0 square miles (75.1 km^{2}) is land and 4.5 square miles (11.7 km^{2}), or 13.47%, is water.

Paynesville Township is located in Township 122 North of the Arkansas Base Line and Range 32 West of the 5th Principal Meridian.

== Demographics ==
As of the census of 2000, there were 1,376 people, 510 households, and 415 families residing in the township. The population density was 45.9 inhabitants per square mile (17.7/km^{2}). There were 752 housing units at an average density of 25.1/sq mi (9.7/km^{2}). The racial makeup of the township was 98.47% White, 0.15% African American, 0.07% Native American, 0.29% Asian, 0.22% from other races, and 0.80% from two or more races. Hispanic or Latino of any race were 0.87% of the population.

There were 510 households, out of which 33.7% had children under the age of 18 living with them, 73.3% were married couples living together, 5.3% had a female householder with no husband present, and 18.6% were non-families. 15.9% of all households were made up of individuals, and 7.3% had someone living alone who was 65 years of age or older. The average household size was 2.70 and the average family size was 3.02.

In the township the population was spread out, with 27.0% under the age of 18, 5.3% from 18 to 24, 25.9% from 25 to 44, 28.1% from 45 to 64, and 13.7% who were 65 years of age or older. The median age was 40 years. For every 100 females, there were 108.8 males. For every 100 females age 18 and over, there were 103.4 males.

The median income for a household in the township was $49,792, and the median income for a family was $53,750. Males had a median income of $32,634 versus $21,793 for females. The per capita income for the township was $19,936. About 5.1% of families and 5.9% of the population were below the poverty line, including 7.1% of those under age 18 and 8.8% of those age 65 or over.
