= Farming Township, Stearns County, Minnesota =

Farming Township, Minnesota
- Township
- Location within the state of Minnesota Farming Township, Minnesota (the United States)
- Coordinates: 45°33′N 94°33′W
- Country: United States
- State: Minnesota
- County: Stearns

Area
  - Total: 38.9 sq mi (100.8 km^{2})
  - Land: 37.5 sq mi (97.2 km^{2})
  - Water: 1.4 sq mi (3.6 km^{2})
- Elevation: 1,191 ft (363 m)

Population (2010)
  - Total: 987
  - Density: 26.3/sq mi (10.2/km^{2})
- Time zone: UTC-6 (Central (CST))
  - Summer (DST): UTC-5 (CDT)
- FIPS code: 27-20600
- GNIS feature ID: 0664145
- Website: http://www.farmingtownship.org/

Farming Township is a township in Stearns County, Minnesota, United States. The population was 987 at the 2010 census.

Farming Township was organized in 1873, and named for the fact a large share of the first settlers engaged in farming.

== Geography ==
According to the United States Census Bureau, the township has a total area of 38.9 square miles (101 km^{2}); 37.5 square miles (97 km^{2}) is land and 1.4 square miles (3.6 km^{2}), or 3.52%, is water.

Farming Township is located in Township 124 North of the Arkansas Base Line and Range 31 West of the 5th Principal Meridian.

== Demographics ==
As of the census of 2000, there were 875 people, 280 households, and 227 families residing in the township. The population density was 23.3 inhabitants per square mile (9.0/km^{2}). There were 289 housing units at an average density of 7.7 per square mile (3.0/km^{2}). The racial makeup of the township was 99.20% White, 0.11% Native American, 0.46% Asian, and 0.23% from two or more races. Hispanic or Latino of any race were 0.11% of the population.

There were 280 households, out of which 47.1% had children under the age of 18 living with them, 74.6% were married couples living together, 2.9% had a female householder with no husband present, and 18.9% were non-families. 15.7% of all households were made up of individuals, and 4.6% had someone living alone who was 65 years of age or older. The average household size was 3.13 and the average family size was 3.54.

In the township the population was spread out, with 32.8% under the age of 18, 9.0% from 18 to 24, 33.7% from 25 to 44, 18.2% from 45 to 64, and 6.3% who were 65 years of age or older. The median age was 30 years. For every 100 females, there were 112.9 males. For every 100 females age 18 and over, there were 125.3 males.

The median income for a household in the township was $50,170, and the median income for a family was $52,216. Males had a median income of $30,586 versus $21,012 for females. The per capita income for the township was $18,431. About 3.5% of families and 4.8% of the population were below the poverty line, including 4.0% of those under age 18 and 14.3% of those age 65 or over.
