= Crow River Township, Stearns County, Minnesota =

Crow River Township, Minnesota
- Township
- Location within the state of Minnesota Crow River Township, Minnesota (the United States)
- Coordinates: 45°26′35″N 94°56′28″W
- Country: United States
- State: Minnesota
- County: Stearns

Area
  - Total: 34.3 sq mi (88.8 km^{2})
  - Land: 34.3 sq mi (88.8 km^{2})
  - Water: 0 sq mi (0.0 km^{2})
- Elevation: 1,250 ft (381 m)

Population (2010)
  - Total: 327
  - Density: 9.54/sq mi (3.68/km^{2})
- Time zone: UTC-6 (Central (CST))
  - Summer (DST): UTC-5 (CDT)
- ZIP code: 56312
- Area code: 320
- FIPS code: 27-14086
- GNIS feature ID: 0663899

Crow River Township is a township in Stearns County, Minnesota, United States. The population was 327 at the 2010 census.

Crow River Township was organized in 1877, and named after the Crow River.

== Geography ==
According to the United States Census Bureau, the township has a total area of 34.3 sq mi (89 km^{2}), of which 34.3 sq mi (89 km^{2}) is land and 0.03% is water.

== Demographics ==
As of the census of 2000, there were 352 people, 115 households, and 99 families residing in the township. The population density was 10.3/sq mi (4.0/km^{2}). There were 119 housing units at an average density of 3.5/sq mi (1.3/km^{2} ). The racial makeup of the township was 100.00% White.

There were 115 households, out of which 45.2% had children under the age of 18 living with them, 75.7% were married couples living together, 6.1% had a female householder with no husband present, and 13.9% were non-families. 12.2% of all households were made up of individuals, and 3.5% had someone living alone who was 65 years of age or older. The average household size was 3.06 and the average family size was 3.32.

In the township, the population was spread out, with 33.5% under the age of 18, 3.1% from 18 to 24, 29.5% from 25 to 44, 21.6% from 45 to 64, and 12.2% who were 65 years of age or older. The median age was 37 years. For every 100 females, there were 101.1 males. For every 100 females age 18 and over, there were 110.8 males.

The median income for a household in the township was $39,107, and the median income for a family was $39,000. Males had a median income of $27,708 versus $19,688 for females. The per capita income for the township was $13,765. About 13.3% of families and 12.7% of the population were below the poverty line, including 20.7% of those under age 18 and 7.1% of those age 65 or over.
