= Luxemburg Township, Stearns County, Minnesota =

Luxemburg Township, Minnesota
- Township
- Location within the state of Minnesota Luxemburg Township, Minnesota (the United States)
- Coordinates: 45°23′N 94°27′W
- Country: United States
- State: Minnesota
- County: Stearns

Area
  - Total: 35.8 sq mi (92.7 km^{2})
  - Land: 35.6 sq mi (92.2 km^{2})
  - Water: 0.23 sq mi (0.6 km^{2})
- Elevation: 1,168 ft (356 m)

Population (2010)
  - Total: 637
  - Density: 17.9/sq mi (6.91/km^{2})
- Time zone: UTC-6 (Central (CST))
  - Summer (DST): UTC-5 (CDT)
- FIPS code: 27-38618
- GNIS feature ID: 0664842

Luxemburg Township is a township in Stearns County, Minnesota, United States. It is named for Luxembourg, whence many of its earliest settlers came. The population was 637 at the 2010 census.

Luxemburg Township was organized in 1866, and named after Luxembourg (German: Luxemburg).

== Geography ==
According to the United States Census Bureau, the township has an area of 35.8 square miles (92.7 km^{2}), of which 35.6 square miles (92.2 km^{2}) is land and 0.23 square miles (0.6 km^{2}) (0.63%) is water.

Luxemburg Township is in Township 122 North of the Arkansas Base Line and Range 30 West of the 5th Principal Meridian.

== Demographics ==
As of the census of 2000, there were 689 people, 213 households, and 172 families residing in the township. The population density was 7.5/km^{2} (19.4/sq mi). There were 218 housing units at an average density of 2.4/km^{2} (6.1/sq mi). The racial makeup of the township was 98.55% White, 0.15% African American, 0.29% Native American, and 1.02% from two or more races. Hispanic or Latino of any race were 0.15% of the population.

There were 213 households, out of which 42.3% had children under the age of 18 living with them, 75.6% were married couples living together, 2.8% had a female householder with no husband present, and 18.8% were non-families. 13.6% of all households were made up of individuals, and 3.3% had someone living alone who was 65 years of age or older. The average household size was 3.23 and the average family size was 3.64.

In the township the population was spread out, with 30.5% under the age of 18, 9.6% from 18 to 24, 29.2% from 25 to 44, 24.2% from 45 to 64, and 6.5% who were 65 years of age or older. The median age was 34 years. For every 100 females, there were 120.8 males. For every 100 females age 18 and over, there were 115.8 males.

The median income for a household in the township was $57,083, and the median income for a family was $62,375. Males had a median income of $28,295 versus $21,316 for females. The per capita income for the township was $20,067. About 5.5% of families and 5.9% of the population were below the poverty line, including 9.5% of those under age 18 and none of those age 65 or over.
