= St. Martin, Minnesota =

City in Minnesota, United States

St. Martin
- City
- Location of St. Martin within Stearns County, Minnesota
- Coordinates: 45°30′10″N 94°40′04″W
- Country: United States
- State: Minnesota
- County: Stearns

Area
  - Total: 0.87 sq mi (2.26 km^{2})
  - Land: 0.87 sq mi (2.26 km^{2})
  - Water: 0 sq mi (0.00 km^{2})
- Elevation: 1,247 ft (380 m)

Population (2020)
  - Total: 312
  - Density: 357.2/sq mi (137.92/km^{2})
- Time zone: UTC-6 (Central (CST))
  - Summer (DST): UTC-5 (CDT)
- FIPS code: 27-57238
- GNIS feature ID: 2396502
- Website: https://stmartinmn.com/

St. Martin or Saint Martin, Smartin to locals, is a city in Stearns County, Minnesota, United States. The population was 322 at the 2023 census. It is part of the St. Cloud Metropolitan Statistical Area.

== History ==
St. Martin was laid out in 1866, and named after Martin of Tours. St. Martin was incorporated in 1891.

== Geography ==
According to the United States Census Bureau, the city has a total area of 0.86 square miles (2.23 km^{2}), all land.

Main routes include Stearns County Roads 12 and 195. Stearns County Road 10 is also in the immediate area.

== Demographics ==
Historical population
Census	Pop.	Note	%±
1900	170		—
1910	177		4.1%
1920	177		0.0%
1930	165		−6.8%
1940	183		10.9%
1950	195		6.6%
1960	215		10.3%
1970	188		−12.6%
1980	220		17.0%
1990	274		24.5%
2000	278		1.5%
2010	308		10.8%
2020	312		1.3%
U.S. Decennial Census

=== 2010 census ===
As of the census of 2010, there were 308 people, 119 households, and 81 families living in the city. The population density was 358.1 inhabitants per square mile (138.3/km^{2}). There were 126 housing units at an average density of 146.5 per square mile (56.6/km^{2}). The racial makeup of the city was 98.1% White and 1.9% from other races. Hispanic or Latino of any race were 3.2% of the population.

There were 119 households, of which 36.1% had children under the age of 18 living with them, 59.7% were married couples living together, 4.2% had a female householder with no husband present, 4.2% had a male householder with no wife present, and 31.9% were non-families. 25.2% of all households were made up of individuals, and 13.4% had someone living alone who was 65 years of age or older. The average household size was 2.59 and the average family size was 3.09.

The median age in the city was 31.4 years. 26.3% of residents were under the age of 18; 9.4% were between the ages of 18 and 24; 31.2% were from 25 to 44; 19.1% were from 45 to 64; and 14% were 65 years of age or older. The gender makeup of the city was 51.0% male and 49.0% female.

=== 2000 census ===
As of the census of 2000, there were 278 people, 95 households, and 74 families living in the city. The population density was 292.8 inhabitants per square mile (113.1/km^{2}). There were 98 housing units at an average density of 103.2 per square mile (39.8/km^{2}). The racial makeup of the city was 99.28% White, 0.72% from other races. Hispanic or Latino of any race were 0.72% of the population.

There were 95 households, out of which 46.3% had children under the age of 18 living with them, 69.5% were married couples living together, 6.3% had a female householder with no husband present, and 21.1% were non-families. 17.9% of all households were made up of individuals, and 12.6% had someone living alone who was 65 years of age or older. The average household size was 2.93 and the average family size was 3.32.

In the city, the population was spread out, with 32.7% under the age of 18, 11.9% from 18 to 24, 22.7% from 25 to 44, 14.4% from 45 to 64, and 18.3% who were 65 years of age or older. The median age was 32 years. For every 100 females, there were 93.1 males. For every 100 females age 18 and over, there were 101.1 males.

The median income for a household in the city was $36,786, and the median income for a family was $41,667. Males had a median income of $26,705 versus $21,750 for females. The per capita income for the city was $12,497. About 4.8% of families and 8.3% of the population were below the poverty line, including none of those under the age of eighteen and 41.7% of those 65 or over.

== Arts and culture ==
St. Martin is the home to a large bikers gathering every summer sponsored by Doochie's Bad Company Bar. It occurs every July. It is also the home city of the St. Martin Martins amateur baseball team. The Martins have become a state tournament regular in recent years—returning nearly every year. The Martins recently added lights to their baseball field, allowing them to play at night.
