= St. Wendel Township, Stearns County, Minnesota =

St. Wendel Township, Minnesota
- Township
- Location within the state of Minnesota St. Wendel Township, Minnesota (the United States)
- Coordinates: 45°36′N 94°20′W
- Country: United States
- State: Minnesota
- County: Stearns

Area
  - Total: 36.1 sq mi (93.4 km^{2})
  - Land: 35.8 sq mi (92.6 km^{2})
  - Water: 0.31 sq mi (0.8 km^{2})
- Elevation: 1,125 ft (343 m)

Population (2010)
  - Total: 2,150
  - Density: 60.1/sq mi (23.2/km^{2})
- Time zone: UTC-6 (Central (CST))
  - Summer (DST): UTC-5 (CDT)
- FIPS code: 27-58198
- GNIS feature ID: 0665536

St. Wendel Township is a township in Stearns County, Minnesota, United States. The population was 2,150 at the 2010 census.

St. Wendel Township was organized in 1868.

== Geography ==
According to the United States Census Bureau, the township has a total area of 36.1 square miles (93.4 km^{2}); 35.8 square miles (92.6 km^{2}) is land and 0.31 square miles (0.8 km^{2}), or 0.86%, is water.

St. Wendel Township is located in Township 125 North of the Arkansas Base Line and Range 29 West of the 5th Principal Meridian.

== Demographics ==
As of the census of 2000, there were 2,313 people, 737 households, and 649 families residing in the township. The population density was 64.7 inhabitants per square mile (25.0/km^{2}). There were 747 housing units at an average density of 20.9/sq mi (8.1/km^{2}). The racial makeup of the township was 98.96% White, 0.30% Asian, 0.04% from other races, and 0.69% from two or more races. Hispanic or Latino of any race were 0.56% of the population.

There were 737 households, out of which 47.8% had children under the age of 18 living with them, 80.9% were married couples living together, 4.5% had a female householder with no husband present, and 11.9% were non-families. 10.2% of all households were made up of individuals, and 3.7% had someone living alone who was 65 years of age or older. The average household size was 3.13 and the average family size was 3.38.

In the township the population was spread out, with 32.2% under the age of 18, 7.1% from 18 to 24, 28.8% from 25 to 44, 25.2% from 45 to 64, and 6.6% who were 65 years of age or older. The median age was 36 years. For every 100 females, there were 104.7 males. For every 100 females age 18 and over, there were 105.2 males.

The median income for a household in the township was $57,946, and the median income for a family was $61,576. Males had a median income of $38,194 versus $21,914 for females. The per capita income for the township was $20,116. About 2.5% of families and 2.8% of the population were below the poverty line, including 3.3% of those under age 18 and 3.7% of those age 65 or over.
