= Brockway Township, Stearns County, Minnesota =

Brockway Township, Minnesota
- Township
- Location within the state of Minnesota Brockway Township, Minnesota (the United States)
- Coordinates: 45°43′N 94°17′W
- Country: United States
- State: Minnesota
- County: Stearns

Area
  - Total: 48.5 sq mi (125.6 km^{2})
  - Land: 47.5 sq mi (122.9 km^{2})
  - Water: 1.0 sq mi (2.7 km^{2})
- Elevation: 1,152 ft (351 m)

Population (2010)
  - Total: 2,702
  - Density: 56.94/sq mi (21.99/km^{2})
- Time zone: UTC-6 (Central (CST))
  - Summer (DST): UTC-5 (CDT)
- FIPS code: 27-07840
- GNIS feature ID: 0663669
- Website: https://brockwaytwpmn.gov/

Brockway Township is a township in Stearns County, Minnesota, United States. The population was 2,701 at the 2010 census. The township includes the City of St. Stephen.

== History ==
Brockway Township was originally called Winnebago Township, and under the latter name was organized in 1858. The present name, named in honor of an early settler, was adopted in 1860.

== Geography ==
According to the United States Census Bureau, the township (mainly T126N R29W) has a total area of 48.5 square miles (125.6 km^{2}); 47.5 square miles (122.9 km^{2}) is land and 1.0 square mile (2.7 km^{2}), or 2.16%, is water.

Brockway Township is located in Township 126 North of the Arkansas Base Line and Ranges 28 and 29 West of the 5th Principal Meridian.

== Demographics ==
As of the census of 2000, there were 2,551 people, 864 households, and 693 families residing in the township. The population density was 53.3 inhabitants per square mile (20.6/km^{2}). There were 885 housing units at an average density of 18.5 per square mile (7.1/km^{2}). The racial makeup of the township was 99.26% White, 0.04% Native American, 0.31% Asian, 0.16% from other races, and 0.24% from two or more races. Hispanic or Latino of any race were 0.16% of the population.

There were 864 households, out of which 44.8% had children under the age of 18 living with them, 71.4% were married couples living together, 3.4% had a female householder with no husband present, and 19.7% were non-families. 14.7% of all households were made up of individuals, and 3.6% had someone living alone who was 65 years of age or older. The average household size was 2.95 and the average family size was 3.32.

In the township the population was spread out, with 31.4% under the age of 18, 7.6% from 18 to 24, 32.9% from 25 to 44, 21.1% from 45 to 64, and 6.9% who were 65 years of age or older. The median age was 34 years. For every 100 females, there were 111.7 males. For every 100 females age 18 and over, there were 115.3 males.

The median income for a household in the township was $54,375, and the median income for a family was $60,625. Males had a median income of $37,865 versus $25,781 for females. The per capita income for the township was $22,041. About 3.2% of families and 4.3% of the population were below the poverty line, including 6.1% of those under age 18 and 7.9% of those age 65 or over.
