= Fifth Avenue Historic District =

Fifth Avenue Historic District may refer to:

in the United States

(by state)

- Fifth Avenue Historic District (Pine Bluff, Arkansas), listed on the listed on the NRHP in Jefferson County, Arkansas
- Fifth Avenue Commercial Buildings, a historic district in St. Cloud, Minnesota, listed on the NRHP in Stearns County, Minnesota
- Fifth Avenue-Fulton Street Historic District, Troy, New York, a historic district subsumed into Central Troy Historic District
- Fifth Avenue and North High Historic District, Columbus, Ohio, listed on the NRHP in Columbus, Ohio
- Fifth Avenue Historic District (Nashville, Tennessee), listed on the NRHP in Nashville, Tennessee
- Fifth Avenue Historic District (Kenbridge, Virginia), listed on the NRHP in Lunenburg County, Virginia
