= The Palmer House (Sauk Centre) =

- Palmer House Hotel
- U.S. National Register of Historic Places
- U.S. Historic district – Contributing property
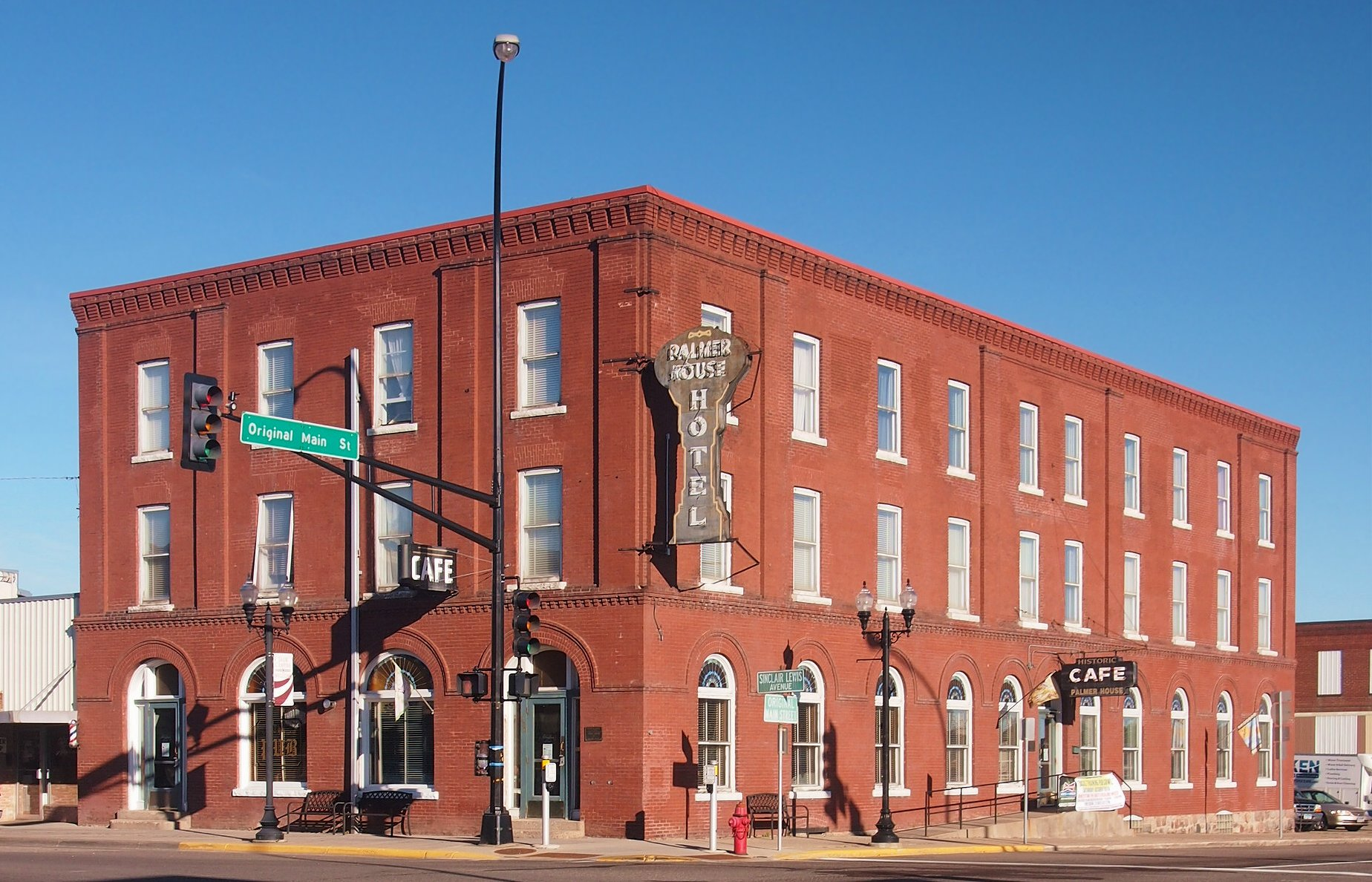
- The Palmer House Hotel viewed from the southeast

- Location within Minnesota Location within the United States
- Location: 500 Sinclair Lewis Avenue, Sauk Centre, Minnesota
- Coordinates: 45°44′15″N 94°57′8″W
- Area: Less than one acre
- Built: 1901, 1916
- Architect: Roland C. Buckley (1916 expansion)
- Architectural style: Commercial Queen Anne
- Part of: Original Main Street Historic District (ID94000758)
- NRHP reference No.: 82003047

Significant dates
- Added to NRHP: February 11, 1982
- Designated CP: August 5, 1994

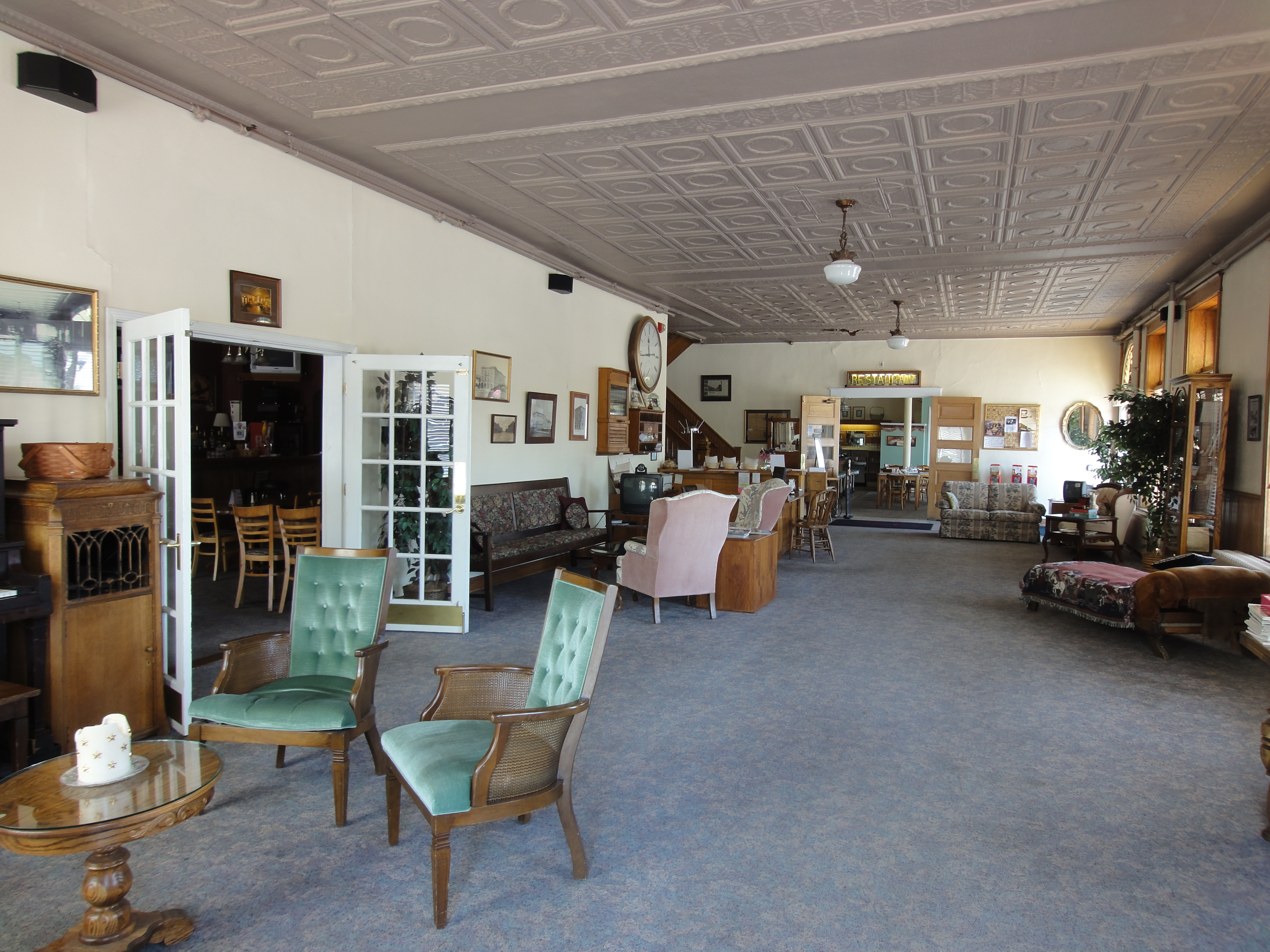
Lobby of the Palmer House

The Palmer House is a historic hotel in Sauk Centre, Minnesota, United States. It was built in 1901 and expanded in 1916. The hotel was listed on the National Register of Historic Places in 1982 for having local significance in the themes of commerce and social history. It was nominated for being an example of a once-common hotel type catering specifically to traveling salesmen. In 1994 the Palmer House was also listed as a contributing property to the Original Main Street Historic District.

Still in business as a hotel, restaurant, and pub, the Palmer House is a member of the Minnesota Hotel & Lodging Association and the National Restaurant Association.

== Description ==
The Palmer House is a three-story brick building on the northwest corner of Sauk Centre's principal intersection. Round-arched windows and doors line the ground floor of the two street-facing elevations, accentuated by decorative brickwork. The arched windows that open into the lobby and restaurant contain stained glass imported from Vienna. The windows of the upper floor are rectangular. Light corbeling marks a belt course just below the second-floor windowsills and along the cornice. Bays of the upper floors are defined by brick pilasters.

The rear addition, built 15 years later, perfectly replicates the design of the original section. The roofline once had low parapets at the corners, but they have been removed.

== History ==
The Palmer House was built in 1901 by Ralph and Christena Palmer on the site of the Sauk Centre House, the city's first hotel, which had burned down on June 26, 1900. It was ideally situated in the heart of Sauk Centre's business district and just over a block from the train station. The Palmer House was the first building in Sauk Centre to have electricity. The Palmers lived on the premises with their two children, and were assisted in running the establishment by Christena's mother and brother.

The Palmer House catered especially to traveling salesmen, arriving by rail, who found not only overnight lodging but meeting space and after-hours relaxation at the hotel. Local residents also used the hotel as a gathering place.

The young Sinclair Lewis worked two summers as a desk clerk at the Palmer House. He later used it as the model for the "Minniemashie House" in his 1920 novel Main Street, set in a town modeled in turn on Sauk Centre.

When it first opened, the Palmer House contained 24 guest rooms. In 1916 the hotel's second owners hired architect Roland C. Buckley of St. Cloud, Minnesota, to expand the building with a rear addition containing another 20 rooms. Guests originally shared a common lavatory off the hall.

The Palmer House was extensively remodeled in 1993. The interior was reconfigured to contain 19 guest rooms, each with its own bathroom.

The Palmer House was purchased by Dave Schrader & Winifred Schrader in December 2025.

== The supernatural ==
The Palmer House held its first paranormal seminar January 18–20, 2008; attendees included television personalities Chris Fleming and Patrick Burns, Darkness on the Edge of Town radio host David Schrader, and other paranormal experts. The Palmer House is featured in the fourth episode of season 8 on Ghost Adventures, where they investigate the building with Dave Schrader. It was also featured in episode 4 of the ninth season of The Dead Files. In 2023, Chasing Paranormal featured the location in Season 1 of their series on The Spirit Realm Network, with Brady & Lexi Goble.

== See also ==
- National Register of Historic Places listings in Stearns County, Minnesota
