= Anton Gogala Farmstead =

- U.S. National Register of Historic Places
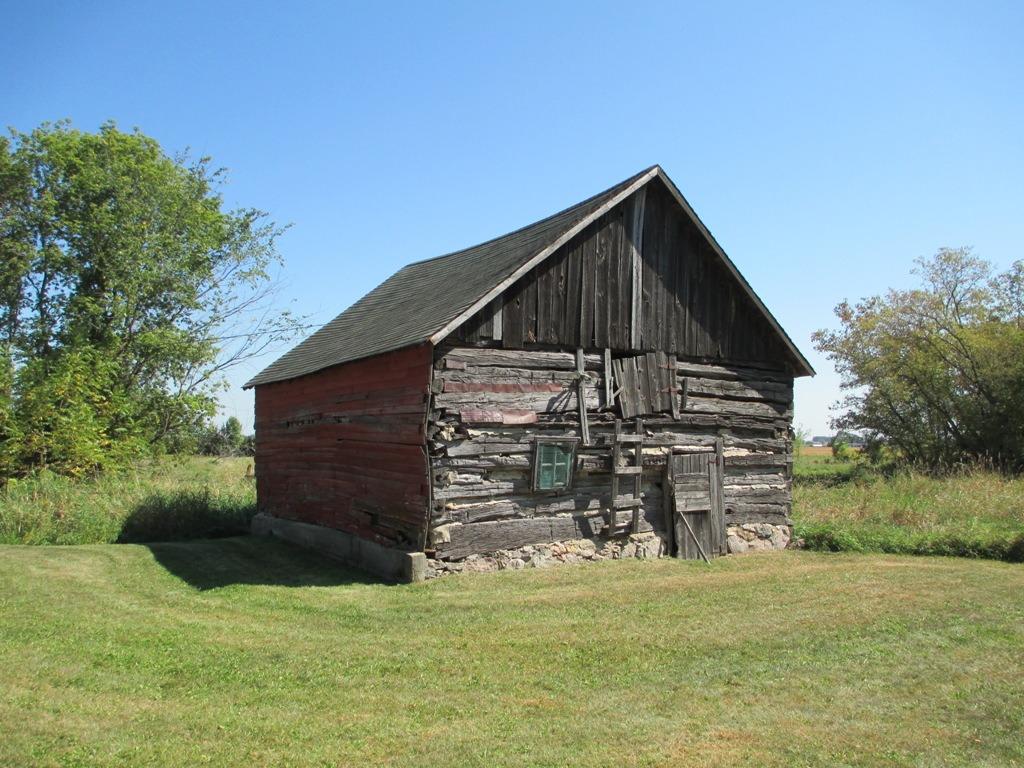
- An outbuilding at the Anton Gogala Farmstead

- Location within Minnesota Location within the United States
- Location: Minnesota Highway 238 and County Highway 39, Krain Township, Minnesota
- Nearest city: St. Anthony
- Coordinates: 45°40′25″N 94°36′20″W
- Area: 10 acres (4.0 ha)
- Built: 1875–1965
- Architect: Gogala family
- MPS: Stearns County MRA
- NRHP reference No.: 82003048
- Added to NRHP: April 15, 1982

The Anton Gogala Farmstead is a historic farmstead in Krain Township, Minnesota, United States. For over a century it remained a small-scale dairy farm operated by a Slovene American family, and contains traditionally constructed buildings and structures dating back to 1875, including several built of logs. The farm was listed on the National Register of Historic Places in 1982 for its local significance in the themes of agriculture, architecture, and exploration/settlement. It was nominated as the best surviving illustration of Stearns County's settlement-era farmsteads of the late 19th century, and for the Gogala family's key role in establishing the Slovene American community of St. Anthony a mile to the north.

== See also ==
- National Register of Historic Places listings in Stearns County, Minnesota
