= St. Anthony, Minnesota (disambiguation) =

St. Anthony is the name of more than one place in the U.S. state of Minnesota:

- St. Anthony, Stearns County, Minnesota
- St. Anthony, Hennepin County, Minnesota
- St. Anthony, Minneapolis' old twin city along St. Anthony Falls

== See also ==
- Saint Anthony Park (Saint Paul), a neighborhood in Saint Paul, Minnesota
- Nicollet Island/East Bank, Minneapolis, a neighborhood commonly known as Old Saint Anthony
