= John N. Bensen House =

Historic house in Minnesota, United States

- U.S. National Register of Historic Places
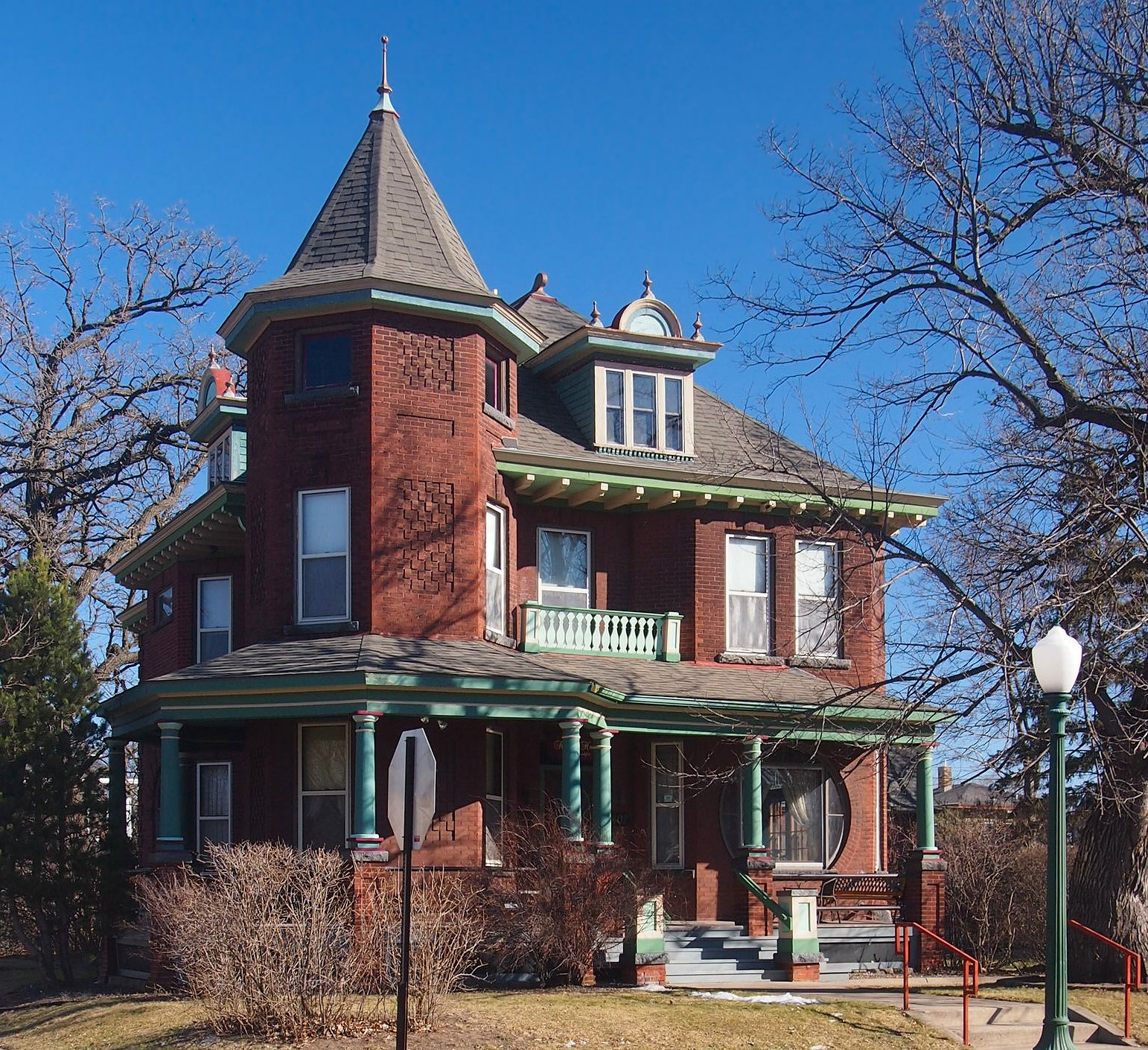
- The John N. Bensen House viewed from the northwest

- Location within Minnesota Location within the United States
- Interactive map showing the location for John N. Bentsen House
- Location: 402 6th Avenue S., St. Cloud, Minnesota
- Coordinates: 45°33′20.7″N 94°9′20.5″W
- Area: Less than one acre
- Built: 1904
- Architect: Samuel H. Haas
- Architectural style: Queen Anne
- NRHP reference No.: 82003050
- Added to NRHP: February 11, 1982

The John N. Bensen House is a historic house in St. Cloud, Minnesota, United States. It was built in 1904 for John N. Bensen (1850–1917), a German immigrant who settled in St. Cloud in 1872, found success in the grocery business, and went on to serve as mayor and bank president. The Bensen House was listed on the National Register of Historic Places in 1982 for its local significance in the themes of architecture and commerce. It was nominated for being one of St. Cloud's finest examples of Queen Anne architecture and for its association with Bensen.

The house now operates as the Heritage House Bed & Breakfast.

== See also ==
- National Register of Historic Places listings in Stearns County, Minnesota
