= Church of St. Stephen (St. Stephen, Minnesota) =

Historic church in Minnesota, United States

- Church of St. Stephen–Catholic
- U.S. National Register of Historic Places
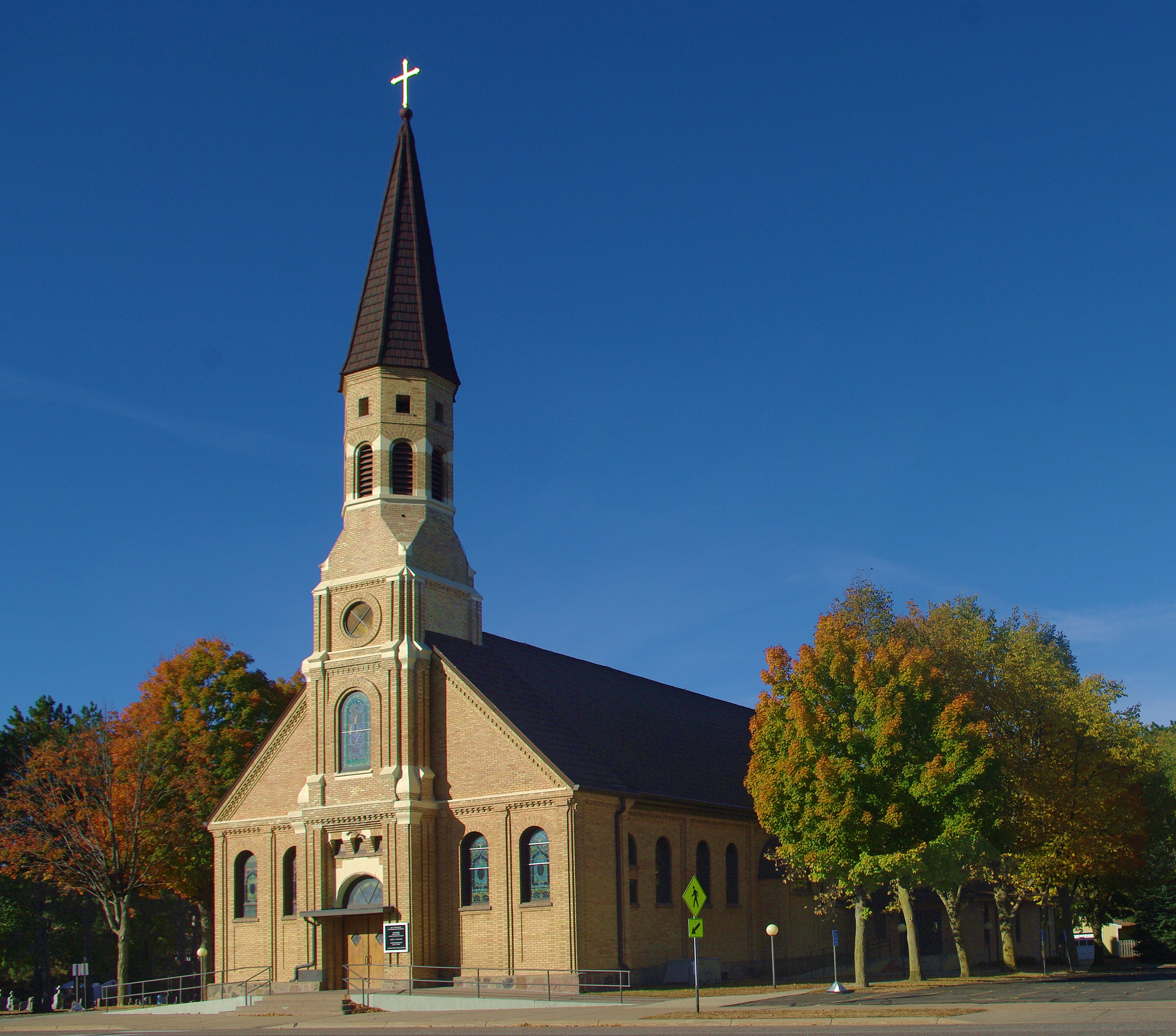
- The Church of St. Stephen viewed from the northeast

- Location within Minnesota Location within the United States
- Location: 103 Central Avenue S., St. Stephen, Minnesota
- Coordinates: 45°42′5.5″N 94°16′30″W
- Area: 2.5 acres (1.0 ha)
- Built: 1890 (rectory), 1903 (church)
- Architect: John Jager
- Architectural style: Romanesque Revival
- MPS: Ethnic Hamlet Churches–Stearns County Catholic Settlement Churches TR
- NRHP reference No.: 82003059
- Added to NRHP: April 15, 1982

The Church of St. Stephen is a historic Roman Catholic church building in St. Stephen, Minnesota, United States. It is part of the Roman Catholic Diocese of Saint Cloud. The church was constructed in 1903 in a rural community settled by Slovene immigrants. An 1890 rectory stands behind the church. Both buildings were listed on the National Register of Historic Places in 1982 for their state-level significance in the themes of architecture, exploration/settlement, and religion. The property was nominated for reflecting the settlement of rural Stearns County by Catholic immigrant groups clustered in small, ethnic hamlets dominated by a central church.

== See also ==
- List of Catholic churches in the United States
- National Register of Historic Places listings in Stearns County, Minnesota
