= Carter Block =

- U.S. National Register of Historic Places
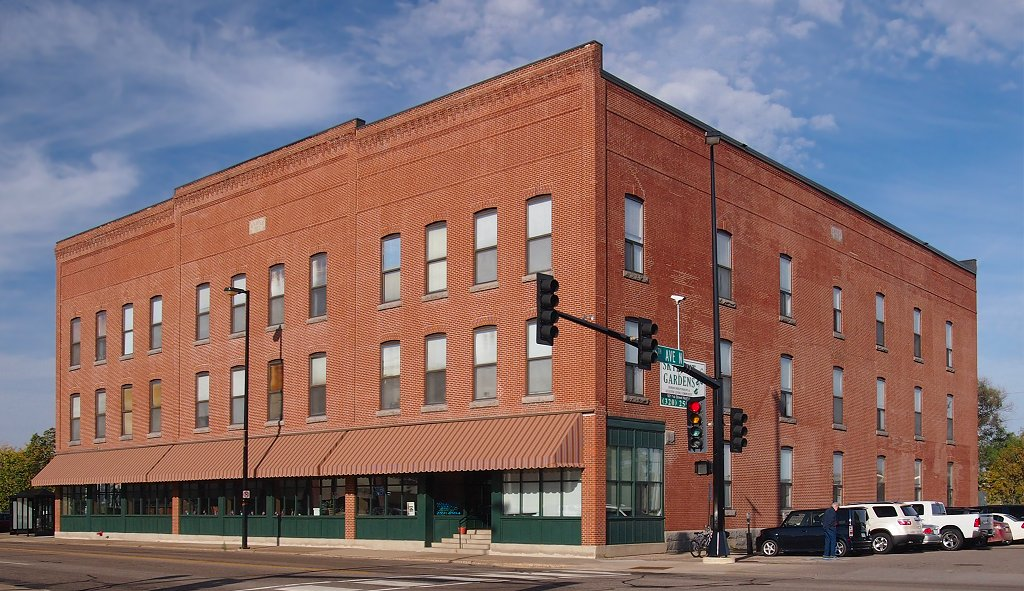
- The Carter Block viewed from the east

- Location within Minnesota Location within the United States
- Location: 501–511 1st Street N., St. Cloud, Minnesota
- Coordinates: 45°33′44″N 94°9′34″W
- Area: .78 acres (0.32 ha)
- Built: 1902
- NRHP reference No.: 86001297
- Added to NRHP: June 13, 1986

The Carter Block is a historic mixed-use commercial building in St. Cloud, Minnesota, United States. It was established in 1902 by businessman Wesley Carter to provide retail, office, warehousing, and meeting space in the developing city. The Carter Block was listed on the National Register of Historic Places in 1986 for its local significance in the themes of commerce and social history. It was nominated for encapsulating the social impact of Carter's entrepreneurship.

== See also ==
- National Register of Historic Places listings in Stearns County, Minnesota
