= Francis Arnold House =

Historic house in Minnesota, United States

- U.S. National Register of Historic Places
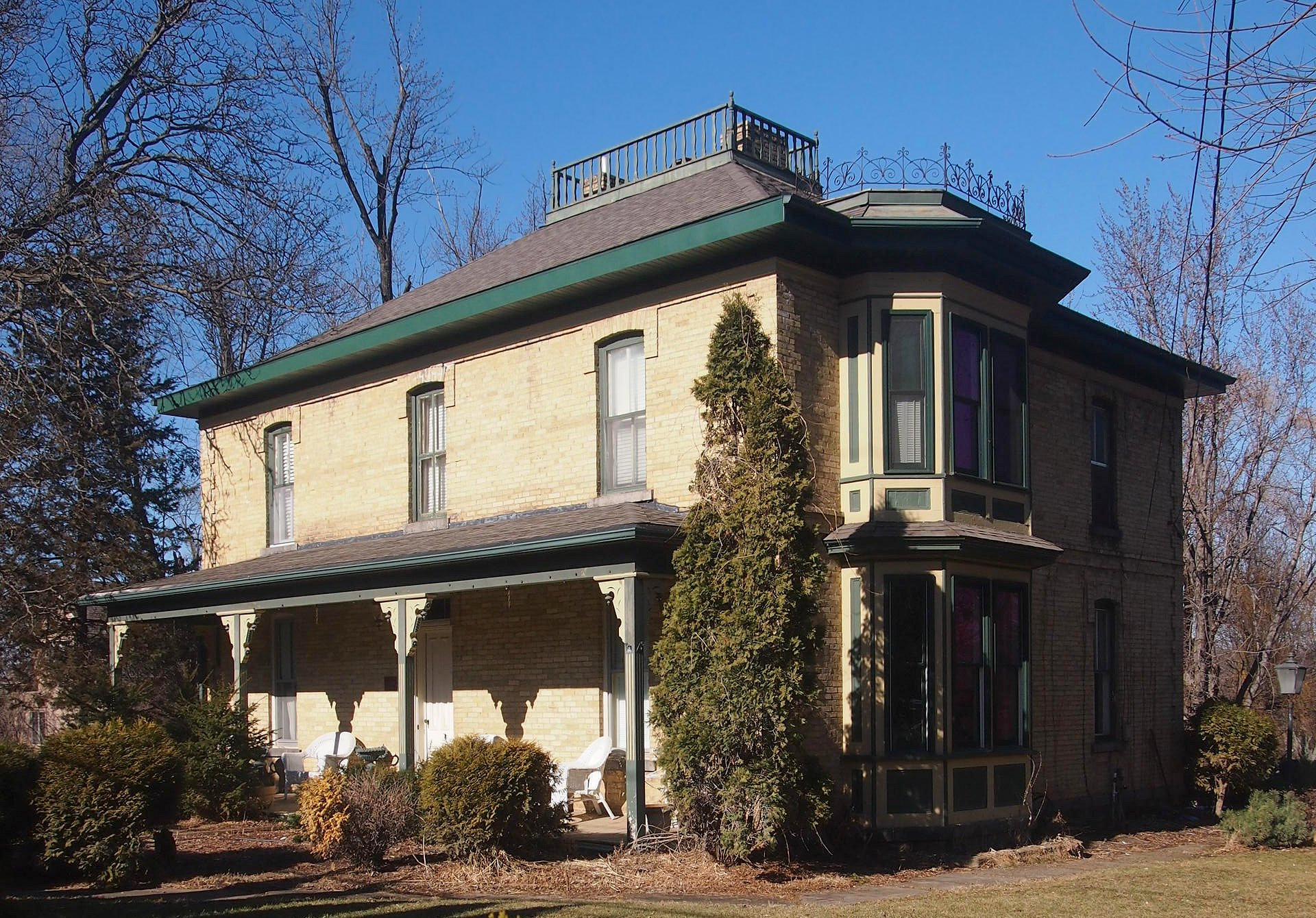
- The Francis Arnold House viewed from the south

- Location within Minnesota Location within the United States
- Location: 32268 County Road 1, LeSauk Township, Minnesota
- Nearest city: St. Cloud, Minnesota
- Coordinates: 45°35′25″N 94°10′35″W
- Area: 1.4 acres (0.57 ha)
- Built: 1884
- Architect: Allan E. Hussey
- Architectural style: Italianate
- NRHP reference No.: 94001409
- Added to NRHP: December 1, 1994

The Francis Arnold House is a historic house in LeSauk Township, Minnesota, United States. It was built in 1884 for the owner and operator of a gristmill that stood just west of the house, on the bank of the Sauk River just above its confluence with the Mississippi. The Arnold House was listed on the National Register of Historic Places in 1994 for its local significance in the theme of industry. It was nominated for symbolizing the family-owned, water-powered mills once common in rural Stearns County.

== See also ==
- National Register of Historic Places listings in Stearns County, Minnesota
