= Belgrade, Minnesota =

City in Minnesota, United States

Belgrade
- City
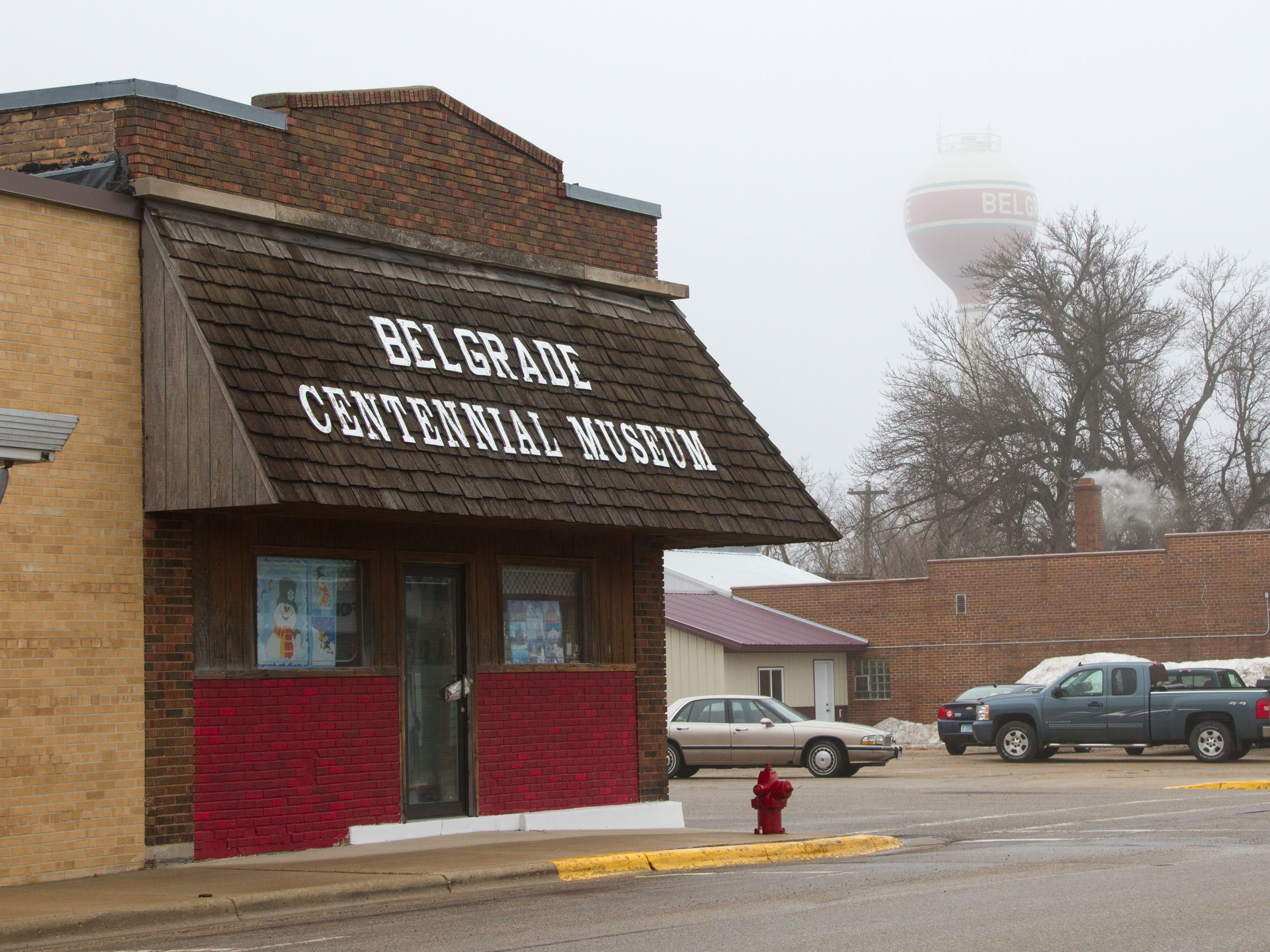
- Belgrade Centennial Museum and city water tower
- Nickname: The Big Crow
- Location of Belgrade within Stearns County, Minnesota
- Coordinates: 45°27′05″N 95°00′12″W
- Country: United States
- State: Minnesota
- County: Stearns

Area
  - Total: 1.20 sq mi (3.11 km^{2})
  - Land: 1.20 sq mi (3.11 km^{2})
  - Water: 0 sq mi (0.00 km^{2})
- Elevation: 1,266 ft (386 m)

Population (2020)
  - Total: 738
  - Density: 614.2/sq mi (237.14/km^{2})
- Time zone: UTC-6 (Central (CST))
  - Summer (DST): UTC-5 (CDT)
- ZIP code: 56312
- Area code: 320
- FIPS code: 27-04762
- GNIS feature ID: 2394108
- Website: www.belgrademn.com

Belgrade is a city in Stearns County, Minnesota, United States. As of the 2020 census, Belgrade had a population of 738. It is part of the St. Cloud Metropolitan Statistical Area. Belgrade is home to the world's largest black Crow.

== History ==
Belgrade is a city in sections 18 and 19 of Crow River Township. It shares its name with the capital of Serbia, a township and its village in Maine, as well as villages in Missouri, Nebraska, and Montana. It was platted in 1887 by the Pacific Land Company and incorporated as a village on March 19, 1888; the post office began as Crow Lake in 1871, changing to Belgrade in 1886. When the railroad came in 1886, there already were a number of businesses; it had a station of the Minneapolis and Pacific Railroad. The first house in Belgrade was built by Norwegian immigrant, Otto Christianson in 1874. Belgrade was named after the first child born in the township right before the town incorporation, Isabella Theolina Christianson in 1887. The city contains one property listed on the National Register of Historic Places, the 1904 Christopher Borgerding House. Arthur Michael Braun (1910-1989), politician and businessman, was born in Belgrade. When building their Centennial Memorial park Belgrade broke the world record for largest Crow in the world.

== Geography ==
According to the United States Census Bureau, the city has a total area of 1.22 square miles (3.16 km^{2}), all land.

U.S. Highway 71 and Minnesota State Highway 55 are two of the main routes in the community.

== Demographics ==
Historical population
Census	Pop.	Note	%±
1890	366		—
1900	450		23.0%
1910	448		−0.4%
1920	487		8.7%
1930	508		4.3%
1940	553		8.9%
1950	659		19.2%
1960	666		1.1%
1970	713		7.1%
1980	805		12.9%
1990	700		−13.0%
2000	750		7.1%
2010	740		−1.3%
2020	738		−0.3%
U.S. Decennial Census

=== 2010 census ===
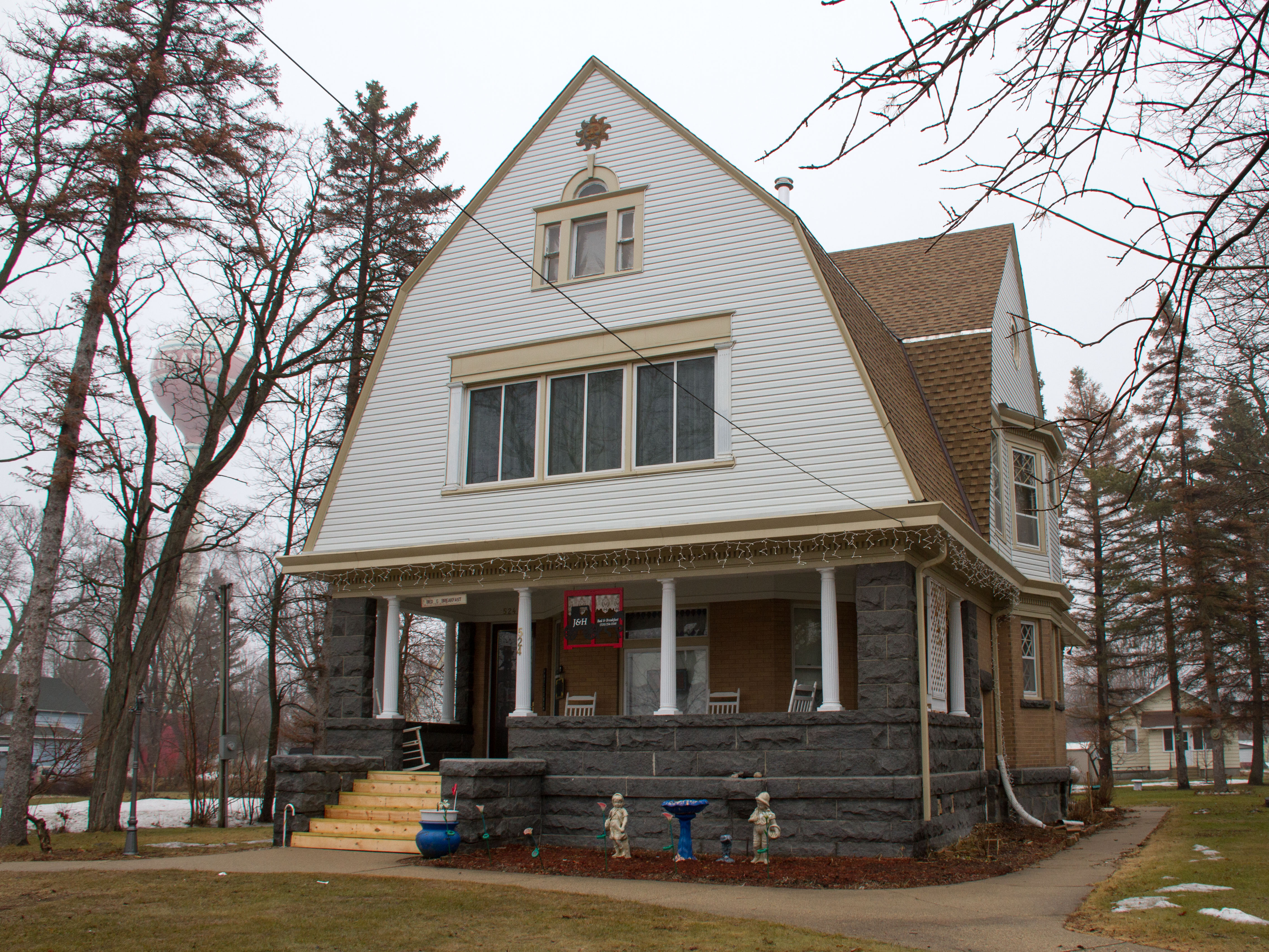
The Christopher Borgerding House, a historic home now used as a bed and breakfast, is listed on the National Register of Historic Places.

As of the census of 2010, there were 740 people, 312 households, and 185 families living in the city. The population density was 606.6 inhabitants per square mile (234.2/km^{2}). There were 363 housing units at an average density of 297.5 per square mile (114.9/km^{2}). The racial makeup of the city was 97.0% White, 0.3% African American, 0.5% Native American, 0.4% Asian, 0.1% from other races, and 1.6% from two or more races. Hispanic or Latino of any race were 0.9% of the population.

There were 312 households, of which 28.2% had children under the age of 18 living with them, 44.6% were married couples living together, 8.3% had a female householder with no husband present, 6.4% had a male householder with no wife present, and 40.7% were non-families. 36.5% of all households were made up of individuals, and 20.8% had someone living alone who was 65 years of age or older. The average household size was 2.24 and the average family size was 2.93.

The median age in the city was 42.1 years. 24.6% of residents were under the age of 18; 6.7% were between the ages of 18 and 24; 21.8% were from 25 to 44; 20.5% were from 45 to 64; and 26.5% were 65 years of age or older. The gender makeup of the city was 48.0% male and 52.0% female.

=== 2000 census ===
As of the census of 2000, there were 750 people, 316 households, and 183 families living in the city. The population density was 636.7 inhabitants per square mile (245.8/km^{2}). There were 342 housing units at an average density of 290.3 per square mile (112.1/km^{2}). The racial makeup of the city was 98.67% White, 0.13% Asian, 1.07% from other races, and 0.13% from two or more races. Hispanic or Latino of any race were 0.80% of the population.

There were 316 households, out of which 23.7% had children under the age of 18 living with them, 46.5% were married couples living together, 9.2% had a female householder with no husband present, and 41.8% were non-families. 38.3% of all households were made up of individuals, and 24.7% had someone living alone who was 65 years of age or older. The average household size was 2.19 and the average family size was 2.94.

In the city, the population was spread out, with 21.9% under the age of 18, 6.8% from 18 to 24, 22.3% from 25 to 44, 17.1% from 45 to 64, and 32.0% who were 65 years of age or older. The median age was 44 years. For every 100 females, there were 84.3 males. For every 100 females age 18 and over, there were 77.6 males.

The median income for a household in the city was $22,098, and the median income for a family was $32,500. Males had a median income of $27,500 versus $19,821 for females. The per capita income for the city was $19,293. About 9.0% of families and 13.6% of the population were below the poverty line, including 16.4% of those under age 18 and 20.8% of those age 65 or over.
