= Pan Motor Company Office and Sheet Metal Works =

- U.S. National Register of Historic Places
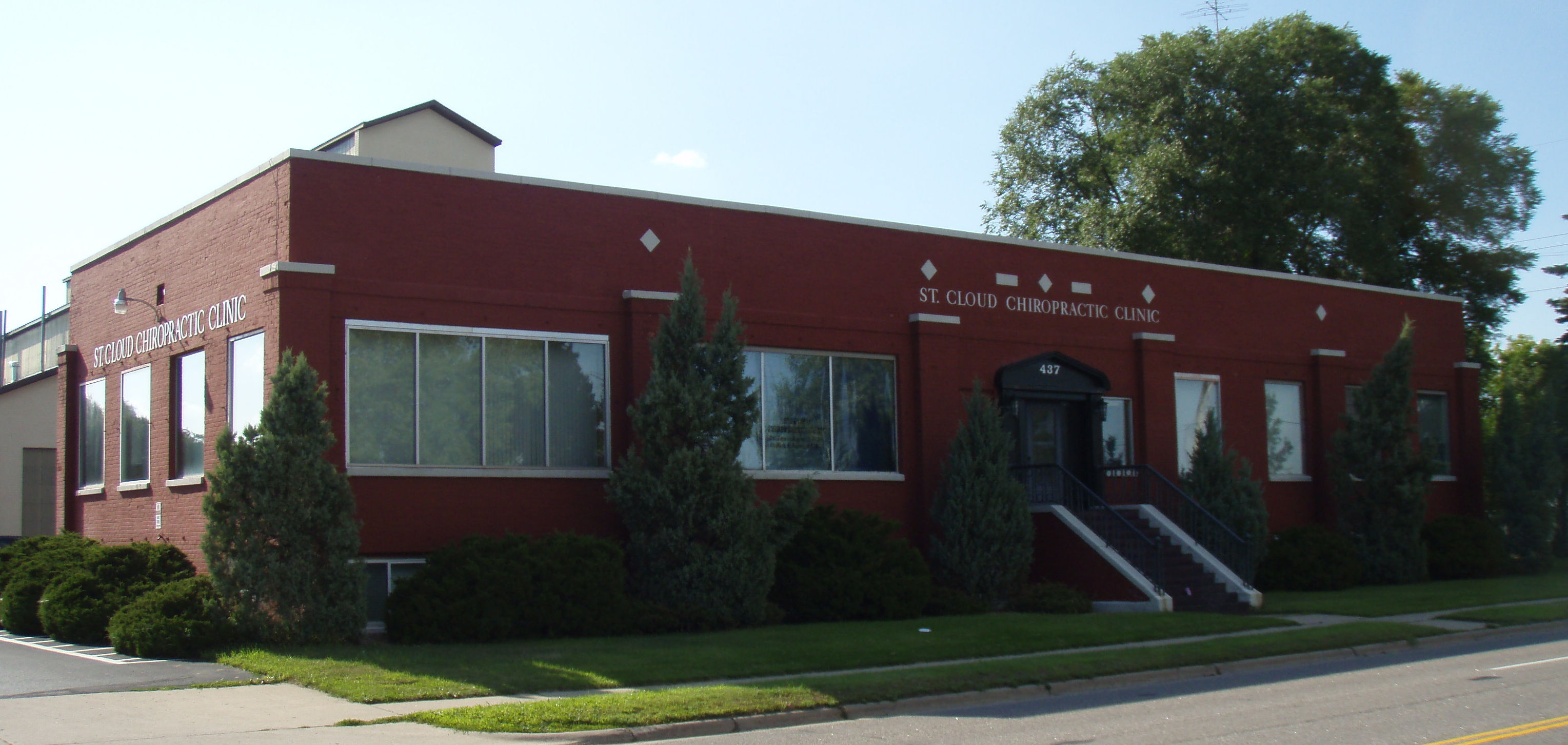
- The Pan Motor Company Office viewed from the southeast

- Location within Minnesota Location within the United States
- Location: 435–437 33rd Avenue N., St. Cloud, Minnesota
- Coordinates: 45°33′43″N 94°11′55″W
- Area: 1 acre (0.40 ha)
- Built: 1919–1920
- NRHP reference No.: 84001694
- Added to NRHP: January 31, 1984

The Pan Motor Company Office and Sheet Metal Works are the two surviving buildings of a former motor vehicle manufacturing complex in St. Cloud, Minnesota, United States. They were built from 1919 to 1920 for Samuel Pandolfo's Pan Motor Company, which produced about 750 vehicles between 1917 and its failure in 1922. The office is a single-story brick building with a flat roof, while the sheet metal works is a much larger steel and concrete structure topped by a double monitor roof. The buildings were jointly listed on the National Register of Historic Places in 1984 for having local significance in the theme of industry. They were nominated for being the remnants of St. Cloud's first large industrial complex and Minnesota's leading, if short-lived, auto manufacturer.

== History ==
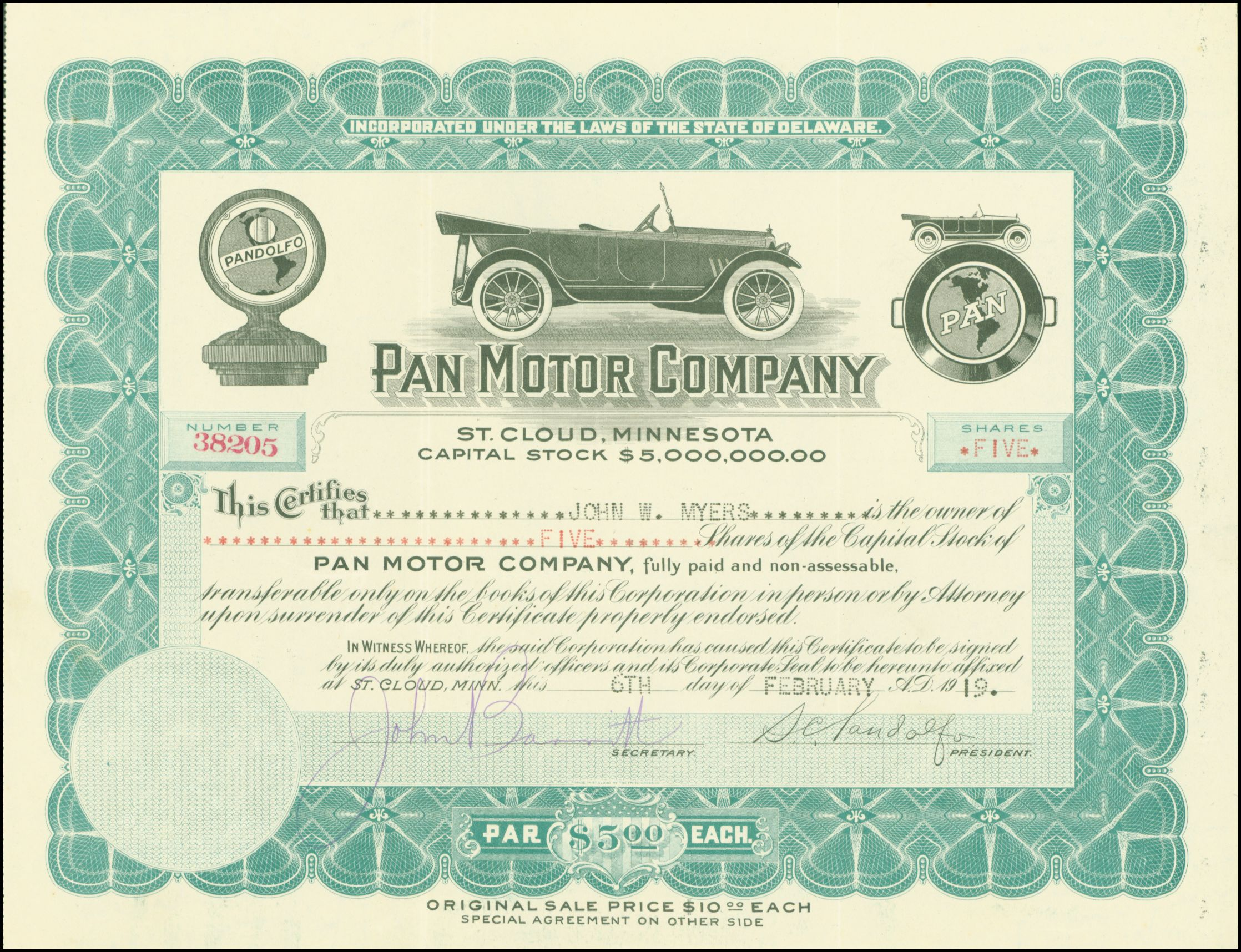
Share of the Pan Motor Company, issued 6. February 1919

Samuel (Sam) Connor Pandolfo (1874–1960) was first a teacher, then an insurance salesman, and finally an automobile entrepreneur. Pandolfo's extensive travels as an insurance salesman inspired him to dream up a new car design, one that suited a traveler. His new automobile would have fold-down seats for sleeping, a compartment for tools and extra gasoline, clearance for bumpy country roads, and a place for food and drink.

Beginning in 1916, Pandolfo took to the road to sell stock for his car company. From New Mexico to Chicago, the $10 stocks (equivalent to $296 in 2025) sold easily. There were 9,000 stockholders by 1917. In March 1917, St. Cloud became the official site for the new Pan Motor Company. The site was chosen because of its proximity to the harbors and iron ore mines of Duluth, Minnesota. St. Cloud had two major rail lines and two power dams on its eastern border, the Mississippi River.

On the Fourth of July 1917, Sam Pandolfo threw the picnic of all picnics. With an immense crowd in attendance, the Pan Automobile prototype premiered; 15,434 pounds of beef and 8,000 loaves of bread were not enough to feed everyone. There were, however, stocks sold to satisfy Pandolfo.

Along with the largest drop forge plant west of Chicago, offices, and massive production buildings, the company built a town called Pan-Town on the Mississippi to house its workers. There were fifty-eight homes, a fire department, and hotel. The company continued to raise capital by selling stock to pay for construction of these facilities. It also spent an excessive amount on postage—$30,000 to $40,000 a year—to promote and sell stock.

Only 735 cars were produced and stockholders were not getting any dividends. The Associated Advertising Clubs of Minneapolis (forerunner of the Better Business Bureau) lodged a complaint against the Pan Motor Company. They claimed Pandolfo spent more money on promotion than his Minnesota charter permitted. Although the suit was dismissed the claim continued to attract attention.

On February 1, 1919, a Chicago federal grand jury indicted Sam Pandolfo and all of the company's officers on seven counts of mail fraud and one count of attempted mail fraud. The judge in the case, Kenesaw Mountain Landis, was not sympathetic. The counts against the officers of the company were dropped but Pandolfo was convicted and served three years in the United States Penitentiary, Leavenworth. The Pan Motor Company struggled as it produced car parts for other companies and metal products under their own name until finally closing in 1922. Car production stopped and the St. Cloud community lost its bid to become a premier auto-manufacturing city to rival Detroit.

== See also ==
- National Register of Historic Places listings in Stearns County, Minnesota
