= Christopher Borgerding House =

Historic house in Minnesota, United States

- U.S. National Register of Historic Places
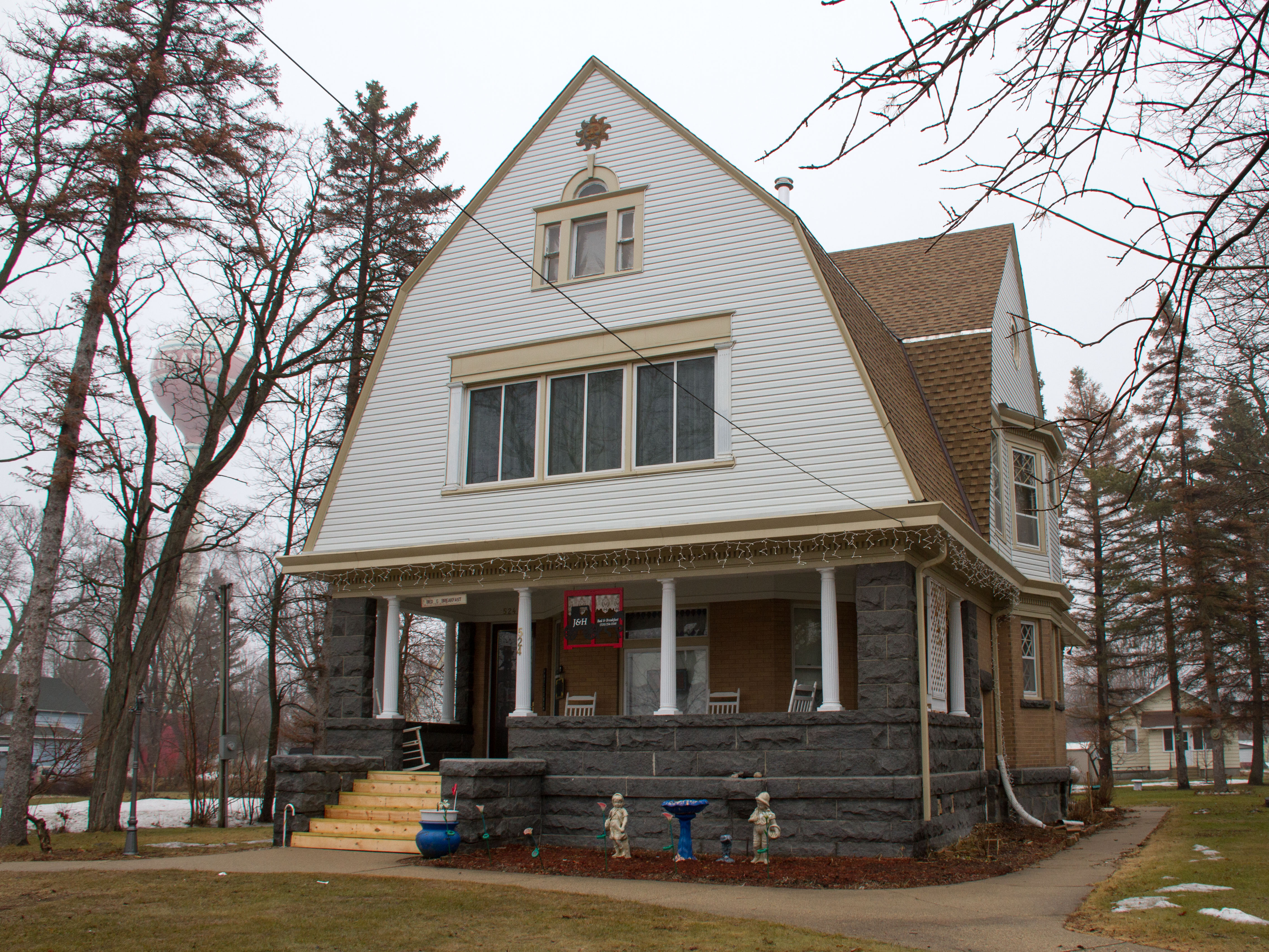
- The Christopher Borgerding House viewed from the west-southwest

- Location within Minnesota Location within the United States
- Location: 524 Washburn Avenue, Belgrade, Minnesota
- Coordinates: 45°27′6.2″N 95°0′13.5″W
- Area: Less than one acre
- Built: 1904
- Architectural style: Colonial Revival
- MPS: Stearns County MRA
- NRHP reference No.: 82003039
- Added to NRHP: April 15, 1982

The Christopher Borgerding House is a historic house in Belgrade, Minnesota, United States. It was built from 1904 to 1905 for an early settler of Belgrade who became a successful businessman and platted an expansion to the town. The house's design exhibits Colonial Revival architecture but with unusual features, such as a deeply recessed porch, granite-and-brick first floor, and cross-gambrel roof. The Borgerding House was listed on the National Register of Historic Places in 1982 for its local significance in the themes of architecture and commerce. It was nominated for its unique and well preserved design and for its first owner's role in the development of Belgrade.

== See also ==
- National Register of Historic Places listings in Stearns County, Minnesota
