= Le Sauk Township, Stearns County, Minnesota =

Le Sauk Township, Minnesota
- Township
- Location within the state of Minnesota
- Coordinates: 45°37′N 94°13′W
- Country: United States
- State: Minnesota
- County: Stearns

Area
  - Total: 10.6 sq mi (27.5 km^{2})
  - Land: 10.2 sq mi (26.4 km^{2})
  - Water: 0.39 sq mi (1.0 km^{2})
- Elevation: 1,040 ft (317 m)

Population (2010)
  - Total: 1,766
  - Density: 173/sq mi (66.9/km^{2})
- Time zone: UTC-6 (Central (CST))
  - Summer (DST): UTC-5 (CDT)
- FIPS code: 27-36656
- GNIS feature ID: 0664763
- Website: http://www.lesauktownshipmn.org/

Le Sauk Township is a township in Stearns County, Minnesota, United States. The population was 1,766 at the 2010 census.

Le Sauk Township was organized in 1860. The township contains one property listed on the National Register of Historic Places, the 1884 Francis Arnold House.

== Geography ==
According to the United States Census Bureau, the township has a total area of 10.6 square miles (27.5 km^{2}); 10.2 square miles (26.4 km^{2}) is land and 0.39 square miles (1.0 km^{2}), or 3.81%, is water. The residents have a St. Cloud mailing address.

Le Sauk Township is located in Township 125 North of the Arkansas Base Line and Range 28 West of the 5th Principal Meridian.

== Demographics ==
As of the census of 2000, there were 1,880 people, 639 households, and 531 families residing in the township. The population density was 133.6 inhabitants per square mile (51.6/km^{2}). There were 643 housing units at an average density of 45.7 per square mile (17.6/km^{2}). The racial makeup of the township was 97.50% White, 0.74% African American, 0.05% Native American, 1.06% Asian, 0.05% Pacific Islander, 0.05% from other races, and 0.53% from two or more races. Hispanic or Latino of any race were 0.64% of the population.

There were 639 households, out of which 44.3% had children under the age of 18 living with them, 75.9% were married couples living together, 4.2% had a female householder with no husband present, and 16.9% were non-families. 13.9% of all households were made up of individuals, and 5.6% had someone living alone who was 65 years of age or older. The average household size was 2.94 and the average family size was 3.25.

In the township the population was spread out, with 30.1% under the age of 18, 6.9% from 18 to 24, 29.5% from 25 to 44, 24.3% from 45 to 64, and 9.1% who were 65 years of age or older. The median age was 37 years. For every 100 females, there were 103.0 males. For every 100 females age 18 and over, there were 105.6 males.

The median income for a household in the township was $60,750, and the median income for a family was $63,125. Males had a median income of $38,980 versus $24,877 for females. The per capita income for the township was $26,510. None of the families and 0.9% of the population were living below the poverty line, including no under eighteens and none of those over 64.
