= First State Bank (St. Joseph, Minnesota) =

- U.S. National Register of Historic Places
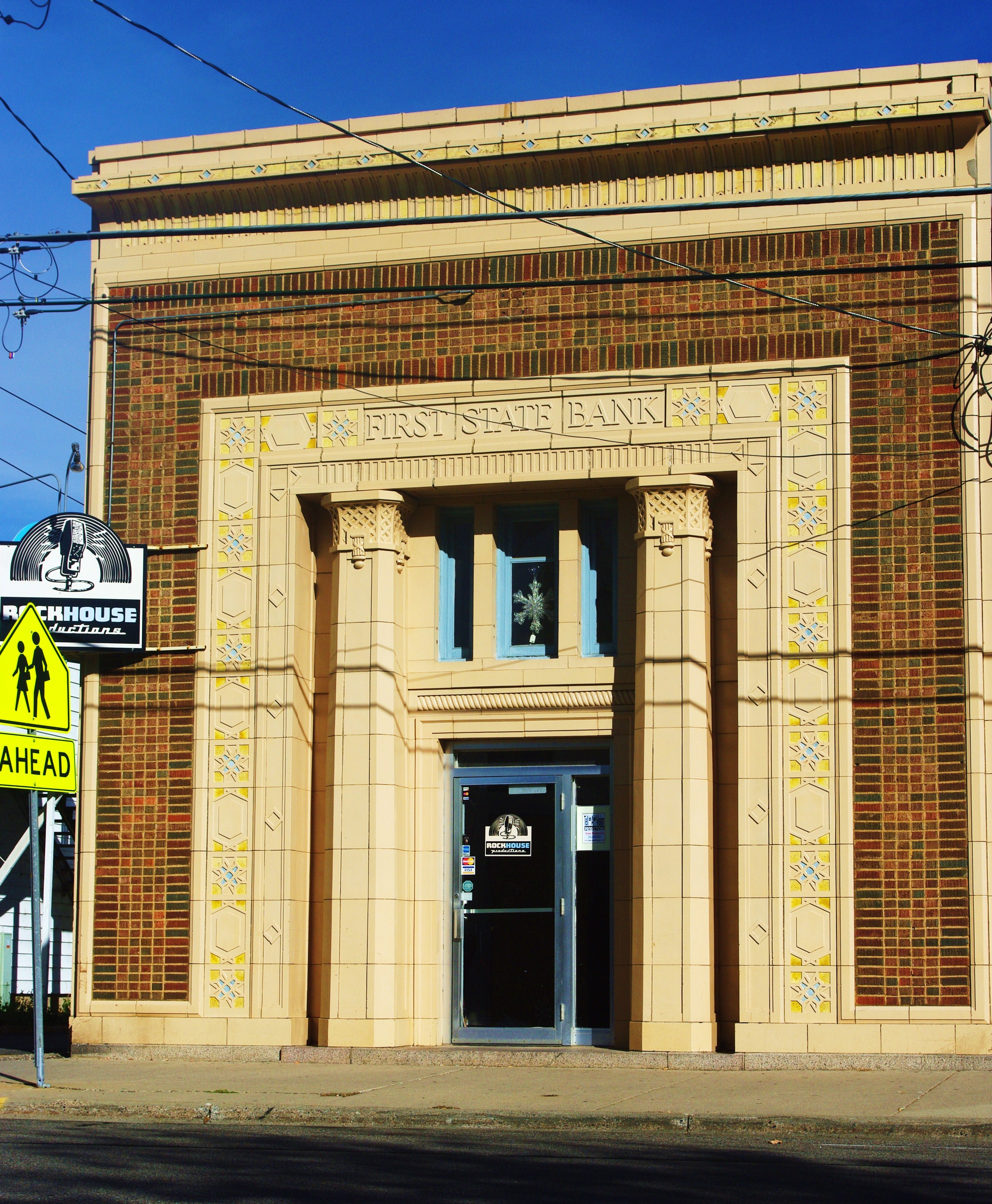
- The First State Bank from the southeast

- Location within Minnesota Location within the United States
- Interactive map showing the location for First State Bank
- Location: 23 Minnesota Street W., St. Joseph, Minnesota
- Coordinates: 45°33′53″N 94°19′7.7″W
- Area: Less than one acre
- Built: 1918
- Architectural style: Egyptian Revival
- MPS: Stearns County MRA
- NRHP reference No.: 82003058
- Added to NRHP: April 15, 1982

The First State Bank of St. Joseph, Minnesota, United States, is a historic bank building constructed in 1918. Its elaborate terracotta façade suggests Egyptian Revival architecture, a rarely used style in Minnesota. The building was listed on the National Register of Historic Places in 1982 for its local significance in the theme of architecture. It was nominated for the aesthetic value its sophisticated and atypical design lends to St. Joseph's principal commercial street.

== See also ==
- National Register of Historic Places listings in Stearns County, Minnesota
