= Foley–Brower–Bohmer House =

Historic house in Minnesota, United States

- U.S. National Register of Historic Places
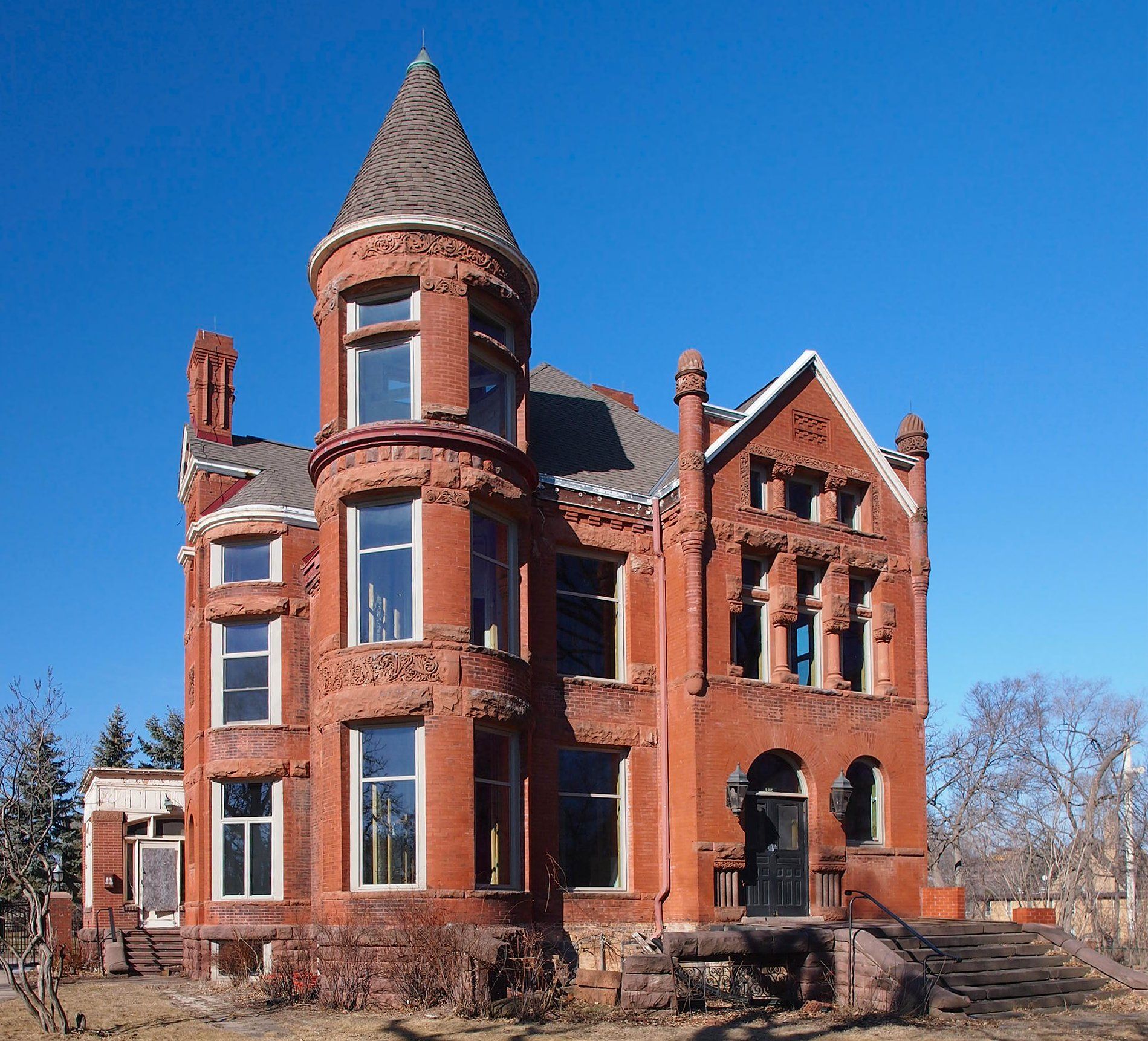
- The Foley–Brower–Bohmer House viewed from the southeast

- Location within Minnesota Location within the United States
- Location: 385 3rd Avenue S., St. Cloud, Minnesota
- Coordinates: 45°33′24.3″N 94°9′8.5″W
- Area: 2 acres (0.8 ha)
- Built: 1889
- Built by: J.S. McCleary
- Architect: A.E. Hussey
- Architectural style: Richardsonian Romanesque
- NRHP reference No.: 78001563
- Added to NRHP: May 5, 1978

The Foley–Brower–Bohmer House is a historic house in St. Cloud, Minnesota, United States. It was built in 1889 for lumber and railroad magnate Timothy Foley, transferred to his brother Thomas Foley in 1895, bought by lawyer and politician Ripley B. Brower in 1902, and sold to businessman and banker William J. Bohmer in 1923. The Foley–Brower–Bohmer House was listed on the National Register of Historic Places in 1978 for its local significance in the themes of architecture, industry, and politics/government. It was nominated for being an outstanding example of Richardsonian Romanesque architecture applied to a large, late-19th-century house, and for the accomplishments of its various late-19th- and early-20th-century inhabitants.

== See also ==
- National Register of Historic Places listings in Stearns County, Minnesota
