= Michael Majerus House =

Historic house in Minnesota, United States

- U.S. National Register of Historic Places
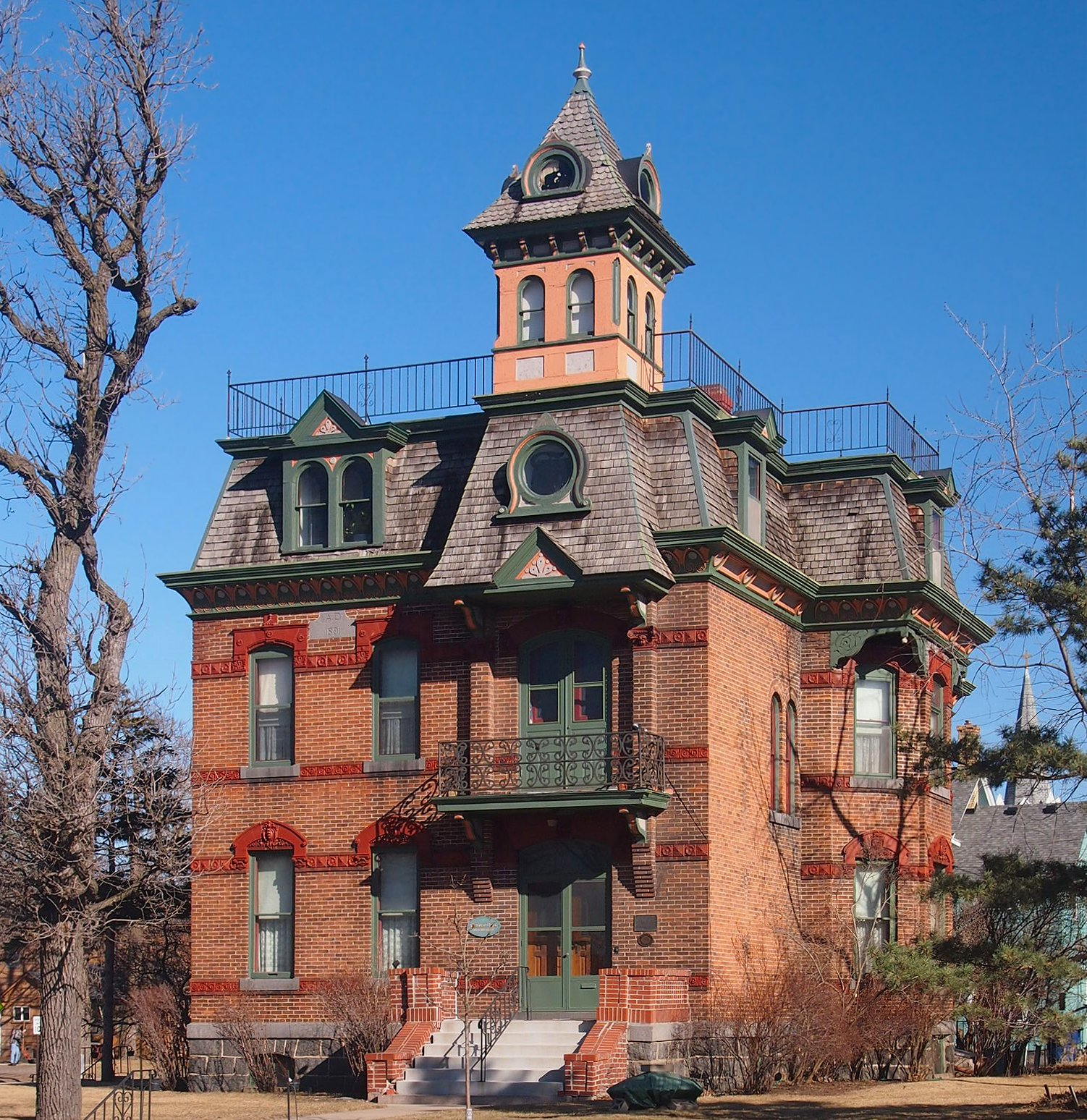
- The Michael Majerus House viewed from the west-southwest

- Location within Minnesota Location within the United States
- Location: 404 9th Avenue S., St. Cloud, Minnesota
- Coordinates: 45°33′20.5″N 94°9′35.5″W
- Area: Less than one acre
- Built: 1891
- Architect: Theodore Kevenhoerster
- Architectural style: Second Empire
- NRHP reference No.: 78001564
- Added to NRHP: May 5, 1978

The Michael Majerus House is a historic house in St. Cloud, Minnesota, United States. It was built in 1891. The Michael Majerus House was listed on the National Register of Historic Places in 1978 for its local significance in the theme of architecture. It was nominated for its status as St. Cloud's finest house in Second Empire style.

== Description ==
The Michael Majerus House is a three-story brick building on a prominent corner lot just south of downtown St. Cloud. The house has a roughly rectangular footprint, with a granite foundation. The dominant feature is a five-story tower rising over the front door. The walls are red pressed brick with smooth granite windowsills. Stone trim adorns the first- and second-floor walls, forming beltcourses and arched window hoods carved with intricate rosettes, scrolls, and cherub faces. Elaborate eaves support the mansard roof, which subsumes the third floor.

A short staircase leads up to the double doors of the main entry, in the southwest corner of the building facing west. Directly above the entryway is a second-floor balcony of wrought-iron. A dormer projection of the mansard roof tops the balcony, decorated with a small pediment and a circular window. A square tower room rises above the roofline. It has two semicircular arched windows facing each direction, with small panels below. Scroll-sawn brackets define the tower's fifth story, consisting of a pyramidal roof with round dormer windows topped by small finials.

Southeast of the main residence is a detached garage that originally served as a carriage house, with two stories and a hayloft.

== History ==
The Michael Majerus House was built in 1891 as a second home for its owner. The architect was Theodore Kevenhoerster and the project came in under $5,000 (equivalent to $179,167 in 2025). It is uncertain why Majerus selected Second Empire architecture, a style that was more than a decade out of fashion and strongly associated with the years immediately after the American Civil War. More popular choices for 1891 would have been Queen Anne or Richardsonian Romanesque. Historian Charles Nelson speculates that Second Empire style had a romantic association for many of Minnesota's German American residents, of whom Majerus was one, as it still saw use throughout the 1880s and 1890s in many German American-owned breweries.

The house received extensive preservation efforts in the 1970s following its 1971 purchase by a new owner. In 2015 the latest owners (only the house's fifth) received a local heritage preservation award for their own restoration work. The exterior of the house is virtually unchanged from its appearance 135 years ago.

== See also ==
- National Register of Historic Places listings in Stearns County, Minnesota
