= National Register of Historic Places listings in Stearns County, Minnesota =

Location of Stearns County in Minnesota

This is a list of the National Register of Historic Places listings in Stearns County, Minnesota. It is intended to be a complete list of the properties and districts on the National Register of Historic Places in Stearns County, Minnesota, United States. The locations of National Register properties and districts for which the latitude and longitude coordinates are included below, may be seen in an online map.

There are 35 properties and districts listed on the National Register in the county, including one National Historic Landmark. A supplementary list includes four additional sites that were formerly on the National Register.

This National Park Service list is complete through NPS recent listings posted August 29, 2025.

== Current listings ==
	Name on the Register	Image	Date listed	Location	City or town	Description
1	Francis Arnold House	Francis Arnold House	December 1, 1994 (#94001409)	32268 County Road 1; 45°35′25″N 94°10′35″W	St. Cloud vicinity	1884 owner/operator's house of the gristmill opposite, representative of the rural water-powered flour milling industry.
2	John N. Bensen House	John N. Bensen House	February 11, 1982 (#82003050)	402 6th Ave. S. 45°33′21″N 94°09′21″W	St. Cloud	1904 house and carriage house significant for their Queen Anne architecture and association with a prosperous German-born businessman. Now a bed and breakfast.
3	Bishop's House/Chancery Office	Bishop's House/Chancery Office	April 15, 1982 (#82003051)	214 3rd Ave. S. 45°33′36″N 94°09′12″W	St. Cloud	Exemplary work of leading local architect Louis Pinault, built 1916 with French-influenced Second Renaissance Revival architecture.
4	Christopher Borgerding House	Christopher Borgerding House	April 15, 1982 (#82003039)	524 Washburn Ave. 45°27′06″N 95°00′14″W	Belgrade	Unusual 1904 Colonial Revival house of one of Belgrade's developers.
5	Carter Block	Carter Block	June 13, 1986 (#86001297)	501–511 1st St. N. 45°33′44″N 94°09′34″W	St. Cloud	1902 mixed-use commercial building that provided key retail, warehousing, and meeting space in developing St. Cloud.
6	Church of St. Boniface	Church of St. Boniface	November 12, 1993 (#93001234)	203 S. 5th Ave. East; 45°40′21″N 94°48′28″W	Melrose	1899 church and 1907 rectory embodying the importance of ethnic parishes in the cultural and religious life of Minnesota's rural German American populace. Renamed the Church of St. Mary. Damaged by arson in 2016 and demolished in 2020.
7	Church of St. Joseph-Catholic	Church of St. Joseph-Catholic	April 15, 1982 (#82003057)	12 W. Minnesota St. 45°33′50″N 94°19′06″W	St. Joseph	1869 church and rectory of a German community, reflecting the settlement of rural Stearns County by Catholic immigrant groups in ethnic hamlets dominated by a central church.
8	Church of St. Mary Help of Christians-Catholic	Church of St. Mary Help of Christians-Catholic	April 15, 1982 (#82003049)	24588 County Rd. 7; 45°28′47″N 94°09′08″W	St. Augusta	1873 church and 1890 rectory of a German community, reflecting the settlement of rural Stearns County by Catholic immigrant groups in ethnic hamlets dominated by a central church.
9	Church of St. Stephen-Catholic	Church of St. Stephen-Catholic	April 15, 1982 (#82003059)	103 Central Ave. S. 45°42′06″N 94°16′30″W	St. Stephen	1903 church and 1890 rectory of a Slovene community, reflecting the settlement of rural Stearns County by Catholic immigrant groups in ethnic hamlets dominated by a central church.
10	Church of the Immaculate Conception-Catholic	Church of the Immaculate Conception-Catholic	April 15, 1982 (#82003038)	37186 County Rd. 9; 45°39′42″N 94°28′29″W	St. Anna	1902 church of a Polish community, reflecting the settlement of rural Stearns County by Catholic immigrant groups in ethnic hamlets dominated by a central church.
11	Church of the Sacred Heart (Catholic)	Church of the Sacred Heart (Catholic)	July 12, 1991 (#91000906)	110 3rd Ave. NE. 45°39′46″N 94°41′10″W	Freeport	1905 church that anchored a Catholic German American community settled in 1876.
12	Clark and McCormack Quarry and House	Clark and McCormack Quarry and House	April 15, 1982 (#82003046)	Minnesota Highway 23 at Pine St. 45°28′24″N 94°20′05″W	Rockville	Leading granite quarry established in 1907—source of "Rockville Pink" structural stone—and owner's 1924 house, representatives of a major regional industry.
13	Nehemiah P. Clarke House	Nehemiah P. Clarke House	April 15, 1982 (#82003052)	356 3rd Ave. S. 45°33′30″N 94°09′07″W	St. Cloud	1893 Queen Anne house of a pioneer merchant and lumberman.
14	Fair Haven Flour Mill	Fair Haven Flour Mill	April 14, 1978 (#78001574)	5001 Birchdale Rd. 45°19′01″N 94°12′53″W	Fairhaven	1867 water-powered gristmill, Minnesota's third-oldest surviving mill. Now preserved in a county park.
15	Fifth Avenue Commercial Buildings	Fifth Avenue Commercial Buildings	April 15, 1982 (#82003053)	14–30 5th Ave., S. 45°33′38″N 94°09′26″W	St. Cloud	Block of six commercial buildings built 1883–1914, representing the history and architecture of St. Cloud's central business district.
16	First National Bank	First National Bank	April 15, 1982 (#82003054)	501 St. Germain St. 45°33′41″N 94°09′31″W	St. Cloud	St. Cloud's "finest designed and best preserved commercial building," built for an influential bank in 1889 and expanded circa 1918.
17	First State Bank	First State Bank	April 15, 1982 (#82003058)	23 Minnesota St., W. 45°33′53″N 94°19′08″W	St. Joseph	1918 bank building noted for its sophisticated terracotta façade; a rare Minnesota example of Egyptian Revival architecture.
18	Foley-Brower-Bohmer House	Foley-Brower-Bohmer House	May 5, 1978 (#78001563)	385 3rd Ave., S. 45°33′24″N 94°09′08″W	St. Cloud	Exemplary 1889 Richardsonian Romanesque house successively owned by industrialist brothers Timothy and Thomas Foley and politician Ripley B. Brower.
19	Anton Gogala Farmstead	Anton Gogala Farmstead	April 15, 1982 (#82003048)	Minnesota Highway 238 and County Highway 39; 45°40′25″N 94°36′20″W	St. Anthony vicinity	Well-preserved example of a traditional small-scale farmstead, with several log buildings dating as far back as 1875. Also associated with an immigrant family that helped found the Slovene American community of St. Anthony.
20	Eugene Hermanutz House	Eugene Hermanutz House	April 15, 1982 (#82003040)	302 N. Red River Ave. 45°27′34″N 94°25′43″W	Cold Spring	One of three adjacent houses—built in 1912—of the co-owners of the Cold Spring Brewing Company, representing the entrepreneurship and importance of Stearns County's brewing industry.
21	Kimball Prairie Village Hall	Kimball Prairie Village Hall	April 15, 1982 (#82003045)	1 Main St. N. 45°18′45″N 94°18′03″W	Kimball	1908 municipal hall built to co-house several government and public services. Now Kimball City Hall.
22	Sinclair Lewis Boyhood Home	Sinclair Lewis Boyhood Home	May 23, 1968 (#68000027)	812 Sinclair Lewis Ave. 45°44′14″N 94°57′27″W	Sauk Centre	Childhood home from 1885 to 1902 of Sinclair Lewis, who would become the most famous American novelist of the 1920s. Now a house museum.
23	Michael Majerus House	Michael Majerus House	May 5, 1978 (#78001564)	404 9th Ave., S. 45°33′20″N 94°09′36″W	St. Cloud	1891 house significant as St. Cloud's finest example of Second Empire architecture. Now a bed & breakfast.
24	Minnesota Home School for Girls Historic District	Minnesota Home School for Girls Historic District	January 19, 1989 (#88003090)	310 U.S. Route 71; 45°45′06″N 94°56′49″W	Sauk Centre	Minnesota's first all-female youth detention center, established in 1911 on a Cottage Plan design by Clarence H. Johnston, Sr. Now Eagle's Healing Nest veteran care center.
25	Model School	Model School	December 29, 1988 (#88003072)	826 1st Ave. S. 45°33′05″N 94°08′54″W	St. Cloud	Minnesota's oldest surviving laboratory school building, constructed in 1913 for a normal school established in 1869. Now Riverview at St. Cloud State University.
26	Original Main Street Historic District	Original Main Street Historic District	August 5, 1994 (#94000758)	Main St. between S. 8th and N. 3rd Sts. 45°44′14″N 94°57′07″W	Sauk Centre	10-block district with 90 contributing properties, considered the inspiration for Sinclair Lewis's 1920 novel Main Street and the concept of "Main Street" as a symbol of American small towns.
27	John Oster House	John Oster House	April 15, 1982 (#82003041)	201 N. Red River Ave. 45°27′29″N 94°25′46″W	Cold Spring	One of three adjacent houses—built in 1907—of the co-owners of the Cold Spring Brewing Company, representing the entrepreneurship and importance of Stearns County's brewing industry.
28	Palmer House Hotel	Palmer House Hotel	February 11, 1982 (#82003047)	500 Sinclair Lewis Ave. 45°44′15″N 94°57′08″W	Sauk Centre	Example of a once-common hotel type catering specifically to traveling salesmen, built 1901 and expanded 1916. Also a contributing property to the Original Main Street Historic District.
29	Pan Motor Company Office and Sheet Metal Works	Pan Motor Company Office and Sheet Metal Works	January 31, 1984 (#84001694)	435-437 33rd Ave. N. 45°33′43″N 94°11′55″W	St. Cloud	1919 remnants of St. Cloud's first large industrial complex and Minnesota's leading, if short-lived, auto manufacturer (in operation 1917–1922).
30	Ferdinand Peters House	Ferdinand Peters House	April 15, 1982 (#82003042)	214 N. Red River Ave. 45°27′32″N 94°25′43″W	Cold Spring	One of three adjacent houses—built in 1907—of the co-owners of the Cold Spring Brewing Company, representing the entrepreneurship and importance of Stearns County's brewing industry.
31	St. Benedict's Convent and College Historic District	St. Benedict's Convent and College Historic District	March 20, 1989 (#89000160)	College Ave. and Minnesota St. 45°33′47″N 94°19′07″W	St. Joseph	Convent and girls' boarding school campus representing the impact and growth of the world's largest Sisters of the Order of Saint Benedict community.
32	St. Cloud Commercial Historic District	St. Cloud Commercial Historic District	February 26, 1998 (#98000153)	Roughly along W. St. Germain St. between 5th and 10th Aves. 45°33′36″N 94°09′40″W	St. Cloud	Central business district with 41 contributing properties built primarily 1870–1947.
33	St. Cloud Veterans Administration Hospital Historic District	St. Cloud Veterans Administration Hospital Historic District	August 21, 2012 (#12000524)	4801 Veterans Dr. 45°34′28″N 94°12′49″W	St. Cloud	Veterans Administration Hospital significant for the local political efforts towards its establishment, its impact on health care for Minnesota veterans, and its Colonial and Classical Revival architecture. Contains 34 contributing properties built 1923–1950.
34	St. John's Abbey and University Historic District	St. John's Abbey and University Historic District	March 23, 1979 (#79001256)	2900 Abbey Plaza; 45°34′47″N 94°23′37″W	Collegeville	Historically and architecturally significant campus of a leading religious and educational institution of the Order of Saint Benedict, with 17 contributing properties built 1868–1959.
35	Stearns County Courthouse and Jail	Stearns County Courthouse and Jail	April 15, 1982 (#82003056)	705 Courthouse Sq. 45°33′38″N 94°09′45″W	St. Cloud	1921 Beaux-Arts courthouse and 1922 Prairie School jail, prominent symbols of Stearns County government. Jail demolished in 1987.

== Former listings ==
	Name on the Register	Image	Date listed	Date removed	Location	City or town	Description
1	Catholic Church of the Sacred Heart		April 15, 1982 (#82003044)	June 17, 1993	Off County Highway 9 (original address); Current coordinates are 45°38′29″N 94°33′23″W	Holdingford vicinity	Frame church reflecting the first stage of Catholic settlement in rural Stearns County. Moved to the grounds of the Stearns County Pioneer Club in 1989.
2	Freeport Roller Mill and Miller's House	Freeport Roller Mill and Miller's House	April 15, 1982 (#82003043)	March 28, 2024	206–210 2nd Street SE; 45°39′43″N 94°41′18″W	Freeport	Representative small milling complex better known as Swany White Flour Mills, with an 1898 mill and adjacent 1900 house. The mill burned down in December 2011.
3	St. Cloud Post Office/City Hall		June 7, 1976 (#76001074)	May 15, 1987	314 W St. Germain St.	St. Cloud	1902 Renaissance Revival post office relocated and converted to city hall in 1937. Demolished in 1986 to make way for a convention center.
4	St. Cloud Public Library		April 15, 1982 (#82003055)	March 19, 1984	124 5th Ave. S.	St. Cloud	1939 library. Demolished on November 18, 1981.

== See also ==
- List of National Historic Landmarks in Minnesota
- National Register of Historic Places listings in Minnesota
