= Riverview (St. Cloud State University) =

Building at St. Cloud State University, Minnesota, United States

- Model School
- U.S. National Register of Historic Places
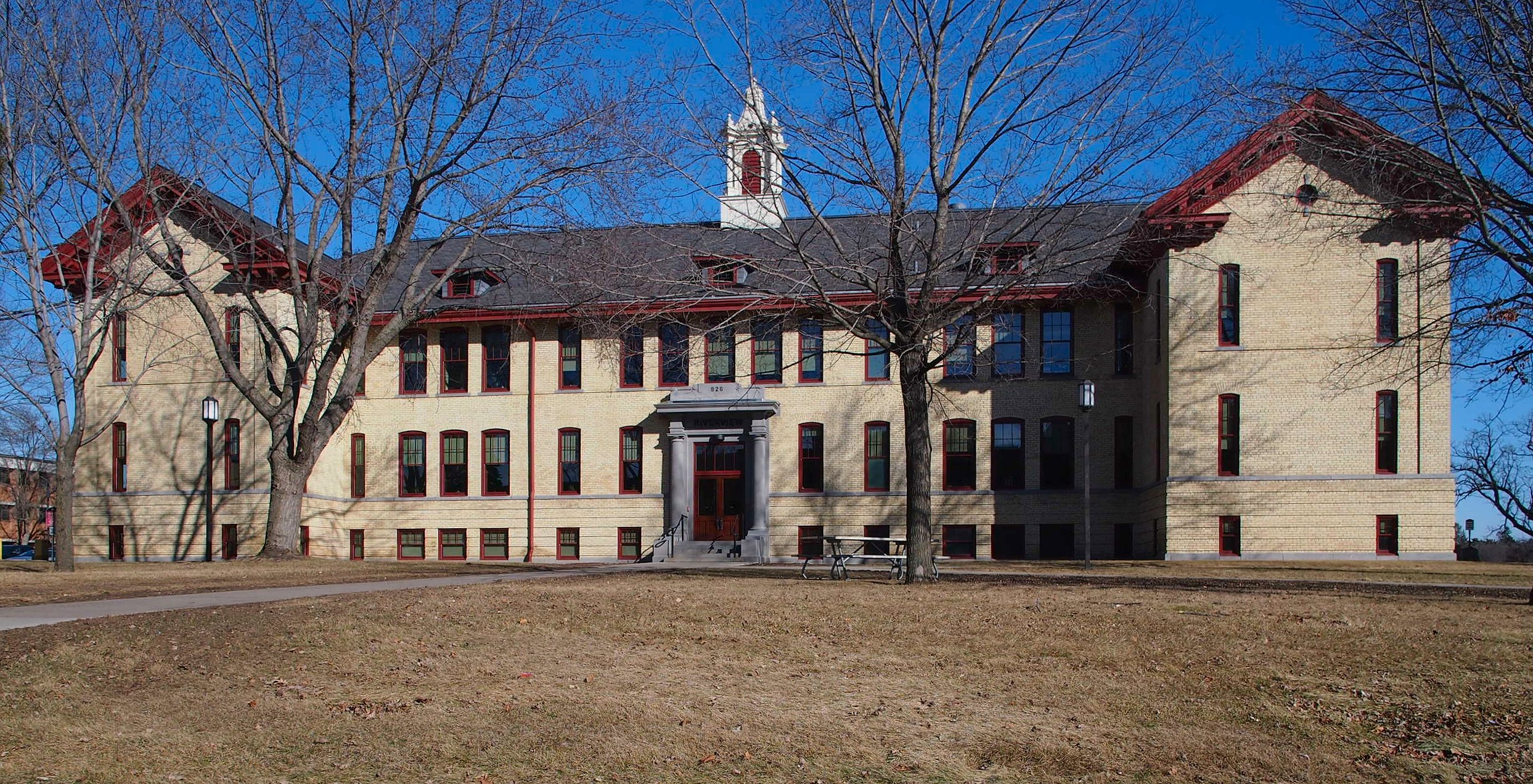
- Riverview viewed from the west

- Location within Minnesota Location within the United States
- Location: 826 1st Avenue S., St. Cloud, Minnesota
- Coordinates: 45°33′5″N 94°8′54″W
- Area: Less than one acre
- Built: 1913
- Architect: Clarence H. Johnston Sr.
- Architectural style: Colonial Revival
- NRHP reference No.: 88003072
- Added to NRHP: December 29, 1988

Riverview is a historic building on the campus of St. Cloud State University in St. Cloud, Minnesota, United States. It was built in 1913 for what was then a teacher training college, to serve as a laboratory school where student teachers gained practical experience instructing local children. The building was listed on the National Register of Historic Places in 1988 as the Model School for its state-level significance in the theme of education. It was nominated for being Minnesota's oldest surviving teacher-training facility.

The St. Cloud Model School continued to serve its original role into the 1950s, but moved into the nearby Thomas J. Gray Campus Lab School in 1958. From 1958 to 2008, the renamed Riverview Hall was home to the university's English department. The hall then underwent a $6.2 million renovation, reopening in 2010. The project retained the historic features of the original building while adding up-to-date innovations. Two historic classrooms, furnished in 1913 style, stand next to smart classrooms and modern communication labs. It now houses the Department of Communication Studies.

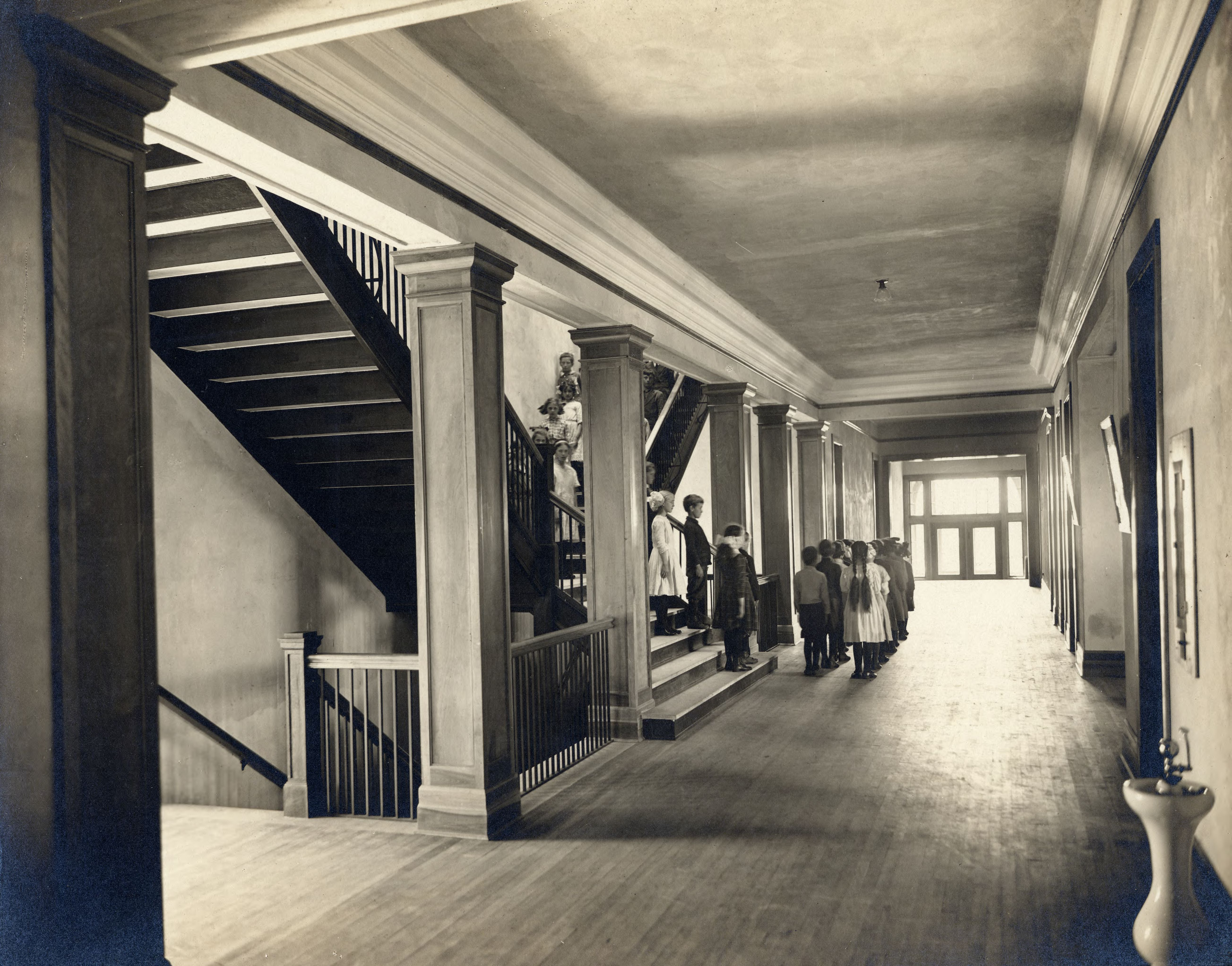
Children line up in a hallway at Riverview Lab School, St. Cloud State University, 1913

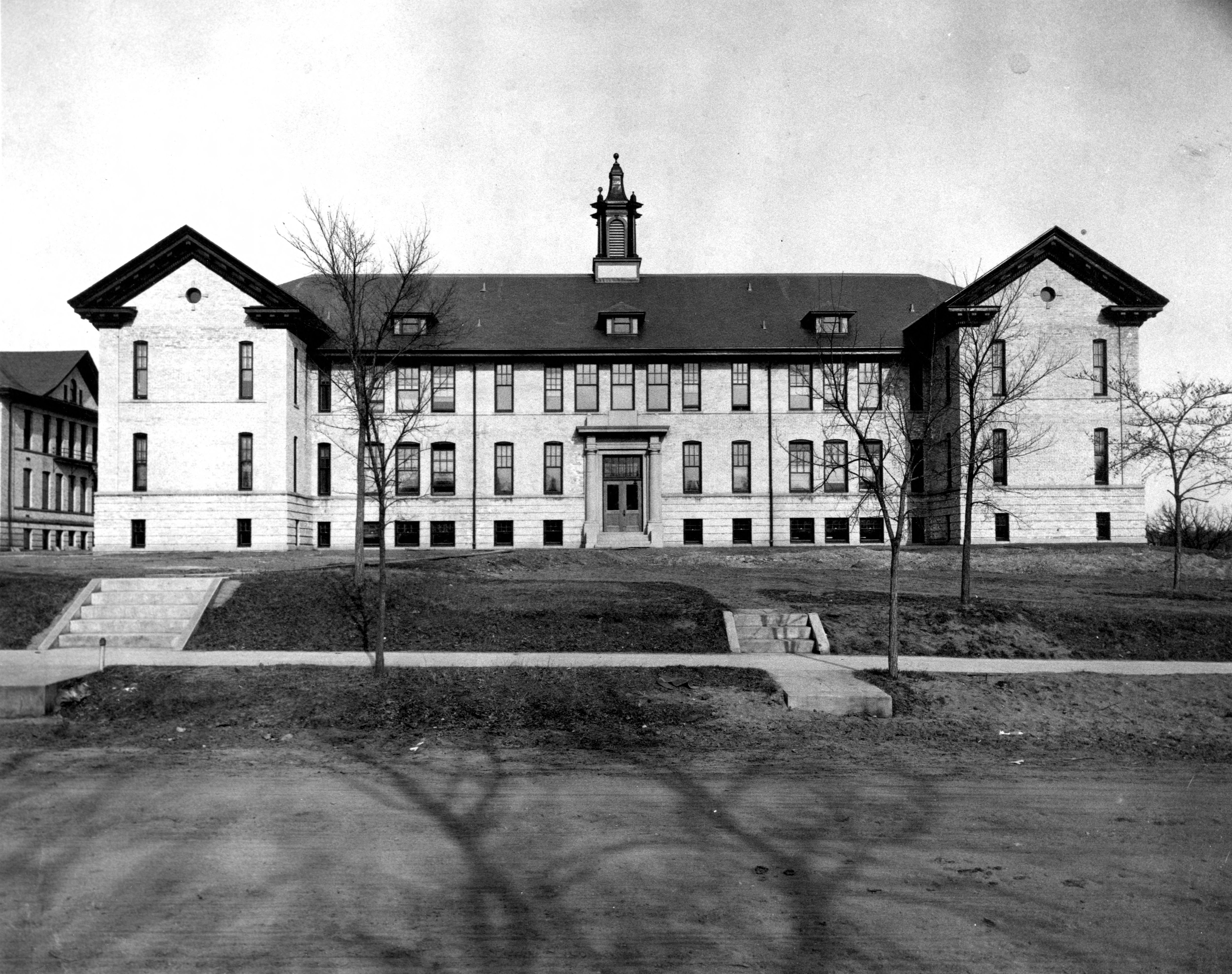
Riverview Lab School, St. Cloud State University, 1913

== See also ==
- National Register of Historic Places listings in Stearns County, Minnesota
