= Chancery House =

Historic house in Minnesota, United States

- Bishop's House/Chancery Office
- U.S. National Register of Historic Places
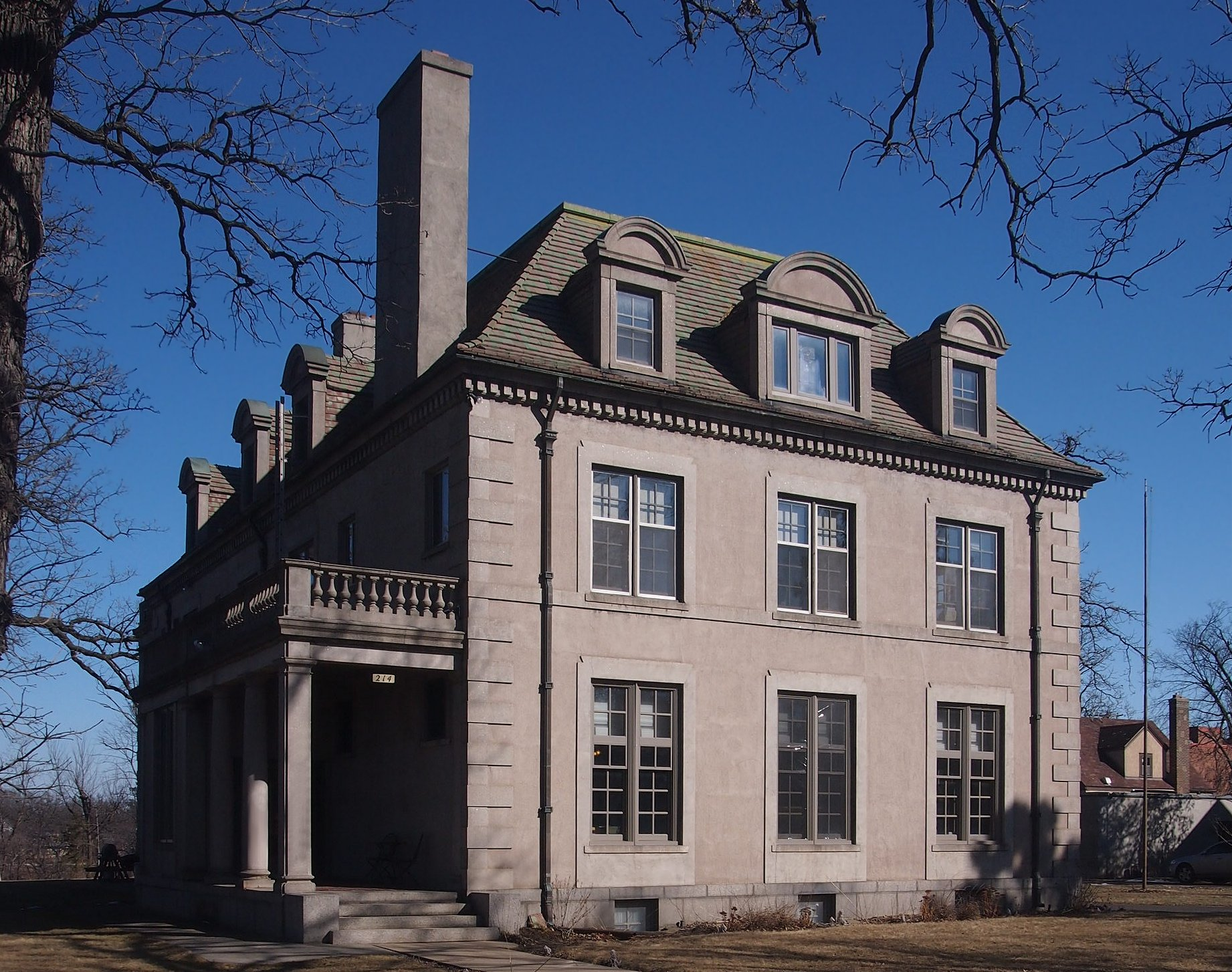
- The Chancery House viewed from the west

- Location within Minnesota Location within the United States
- Location: 214 3rd Avenue S., St. Cloud, Minnesota
- Coordinates: 45°33′36″N 94°9′12″W
- Area: Less than one acre
- Built: 1916
- Architect: Louis Pinault
- Architectural style: Renaissance Revival
- MPS: Stearns County MRA
- NRHP reference No.: 82003051
- Added to NRHP: April 15, 1982

The Chancery House in St. Cloud, Minnesota, United States, is the current chancery for the Diocese of Saint Cloud and the former residence for the Bishop of St. Cloud. It was built in 1916 for Bishop Joseph Francis Busch. The Chancery House was an early work of Louis Pinault, St. Cloud's most prominent early-20th-century architect. He employed Renaissance Revival style, with a mansard roof that gives the house a strong French character. The building was listed on the National Register of Historic Places as the Bishop's House/Chancery Office in 1982 for its local significance in the theme of architecture. It was nominated for being one of Pinault's best designs and a prominent member of St. Cloud's housing stock.

== See also ==
- National Register of Historic Places listings in Stearns County, Minnesota
