= Krain Township, Stearns County, Minnesota =

Krain Township, Minnesota
- Township
- Location within the state of Minnesota Krain Township, Minnesota (the United States)
- Coordinates: 45°43′N 94°34′W
- Country: United States
- State: Minnesota
- County: Stearns

Area
  - Total: 44.1 sq mi (114.2 km^{2})
  - Land: 43.4 sq mi (112.3 km^{2})
  - Water: 0.73 sq mi (1.9 km^{2})
- Elevation: 1,266 ft (386 m)

Population (2010)
  - Total: 981
  - Density: 22.6/sq mi (8.74/km^{2})
- Time zone: UTC-6 (Central (CST))
  - Summer (DST): UTC-5 (CDT)
- FIPS code: 27-33722
- GNIS feature ID: 0664645

Krain Township is a township in Stearns County, Minnesota, United States. The population was 981 at the 2010 census. The township includes the city of St. Anthony.

Krain Township was organized in 1872, and named for the Austrian Krain region (now part of Slovenia), the native home of a share of the early settlers. The township contains one property listed on the National Register of Historic Places: the Anton Gogala Farmstead, established around 1875.

== Geography ==
According to the United States Census Bureau, the township has a total area of 44.1 square miles (114 km^{2}); 43.4 square miles (112 km^{2}) is land and 0.7 square miles (1.8 km^{2}), or 1.66%, is water.

Krain Township is located in Township 126 North of the Arkansas Base Line and Range 31 West of the 5th Principal Meridian.

== Demographics ==
As of the census of 2000, there were 901 people, 274 households, and 235 families residing in the township. The population density was 20.8 inhabitants per square mile (8.0/km^{2}). There were 289 housing units at an average density of 6.7 per square mile (2.6/km^{2}). The racial makeup of the township was 99.11% White, 0.44% Native American, and 0.44% from two or more races.

There were 274 households, out of which 44.9% had children under the age of 18 living with them, 76.6% were married couples living together, 4.7% had a female householder with no husband present, and 13.9% were non-families. 13.1% of all households were made up of individuals, and 5.5% had someone living alone who was 65 years of age or older. The average household size was 3.29 and the average family size was 3.56.

In the township the population was spread out, with 32.0% under the age of 18, 10.2% from 18 to 24, 25.9% from 25 to 44, 22.3% from 45 to 64, and 9.7% who were 65 years of age or older. The median age was 32 years. For every 100 females, there were 122.5 males. For every 100 females age 18 and over, there were 122.9 males.

The median income for a household in the township was $40,550, and the median income for a family was $42,228. Males had a median income of $27,768 versus $20,875 for females. The per capita income for the township was $17,556. About 6.9% of families and 8.6% of the population were below the poverty line, including 10.5% of those under age 18 and 7.4% of those age 65 or over.
