= Original Main Street Historic District =

Historic district in Minnesota, United States

- U.S. National Register of Historic Places
- U.S. Historic district
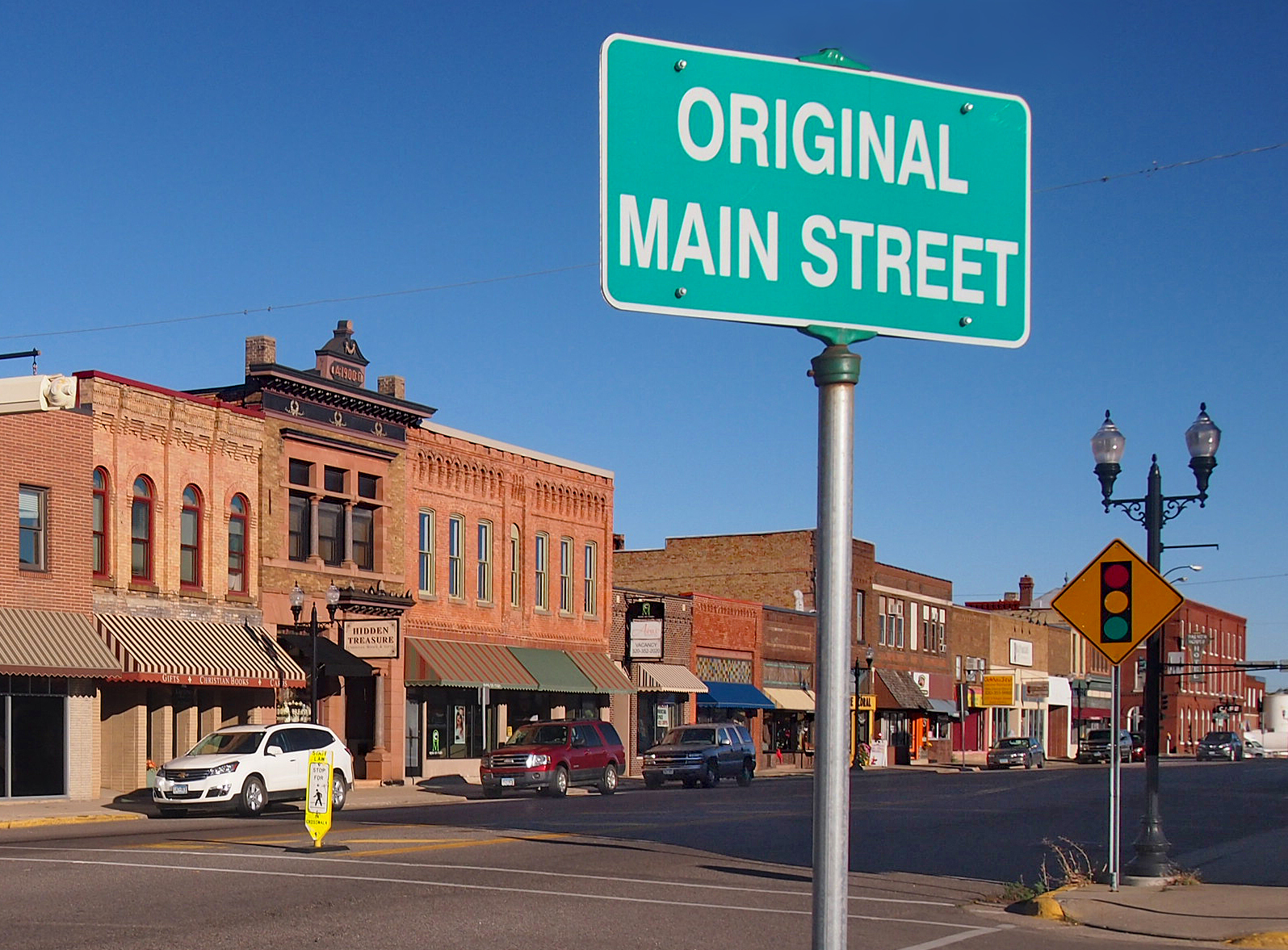
- Part of the Original Main Street in downtown Sauk Centre

- Location within Minnesota Location within the United States
- Location: Main Street between S. 8th and N. 3rd Streets, Sauk Centre, Minnesota
- Coordinates: 45°44′14″N 94°57′7″W
- Area: 45 acres (18 ha)
- Built: 1920–1947
- Architect: Multiple
- Architectural style: Greek Revival, Late 19th and 20th Century Revivals, Late Victorian
- NRHP reference No.: 94000758
- Added to NRHP: August 5, 1994

The Original Main Street Historic District stretches for ten blocks along Main Street in downtown Sauk Centre, Minnesota, United States. It is considered the inspiration for the 1920 novel Main Street by locally born author Sinclair Lewis, which in turn inspired the concept of "Main Street" as a symbol of American small towns. It was listed as a historic district on the National Register of Historic Places in 1994 for its national significance in the theme of social history. It was nominated for its close identification with the bestselling novel of the 1920s and the enduring concept it popularized.

At the time of the district's accession to the National Register, it contained 90 contributing properties and 55 non-contributing properties. The contributing properties include the 82.5-foot-wide (25.1 m) Main Street itself and the various surviving features along its length from the period 1920 to 1947. These include commercial and civic buildings, houses, parks, and a bridge and dam on the Sauk River.

== See also ==
- National Register of Historic Places listings in Stearns County, Minnesota
