= Fifth Avenue Commercial Buildings =

- U.S. National Register of Historic Places
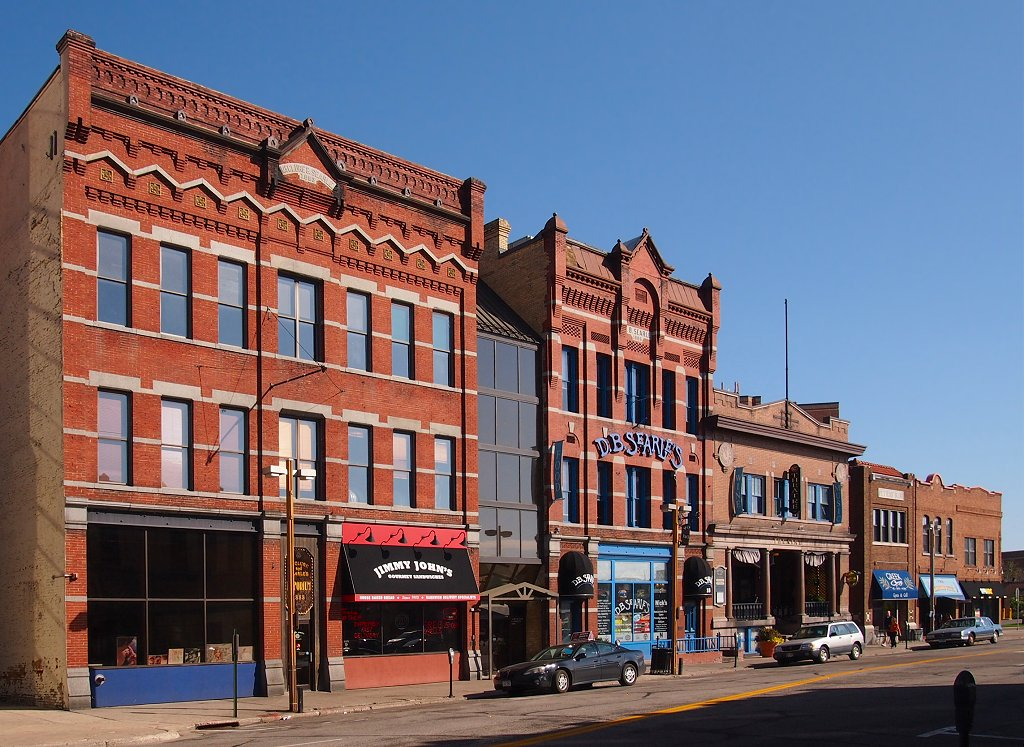
- The Fifth Avenue Commercial Buildings viewed from the west

- Location within Minnesota Location within the United States
- Location: 14–30 5th Avenue S., St. Cloud, Minnesota
- Coordinates: 45°33′38″N 94°9′26″W
- Area: 2 acres (0.81 ha)
- Built: 1883–1914
- Architect: Roland C. Buckley, et al.
- Architectural style: Neoclassical, Queen Anne
- MPS: Stearns County MRA
- NRHP reference No.: 82003053
- Added to NRHP: April 15, 1982

The Fifth Avenue Commercial Buildings comprise a row of six buildings in St. Cloud, Minnesota, United States, constructed between 1883 and 1914. The buildings were listed on the National Register of Historic Places in 1982 for their local significance in the themes of architecture and commerce. As St. Cloud's best preserved commercial block from the turn of the 20th century, it was nominated for reflecting the commercial architecture and history of the city's downtown business district.

== See also ==
- National Register of Historic Places listings in Stearns County, Minnesota
