= St. Stephen, Minnesota =

City in Minnesota, United States

Saint Stephen
- City
- Motto: "A Place To Call Home"
- Location of Saint Stephen within Stearns County, Minnesota
- Coordinates: 45°42′04″N 94°16′27″W
- Country: United States
- State: Minnesota
- County: Stearns
- Founded: 1903
- Incorporated: 1914

Government
  - Mayor: Lisa Marvin

Area
  - Total: 3.72 sq mi (9.64 km^{2})
  - Land: 3.72 sq mi (9.64 km^{2})
  - Water: 0 sq mi (0.00 km^{2})
- Elevation: 1,207 ft (368 m)

Population (2020)
  - Total: 797
  - Estimate (2022): 800
  - Density: 214.1/sq mi (82.67/km^{2})
- Time zone: UTC–6 (Central (CST))
  - Summer (DST): UTC–5 (CDT)
- ZIP Code: 56375
- Area code: 320
- FIPS code: 27-58090
- GNIS feature ID: 2396521
- Sales tax: 7.125%
- Website: cityofststephen.com

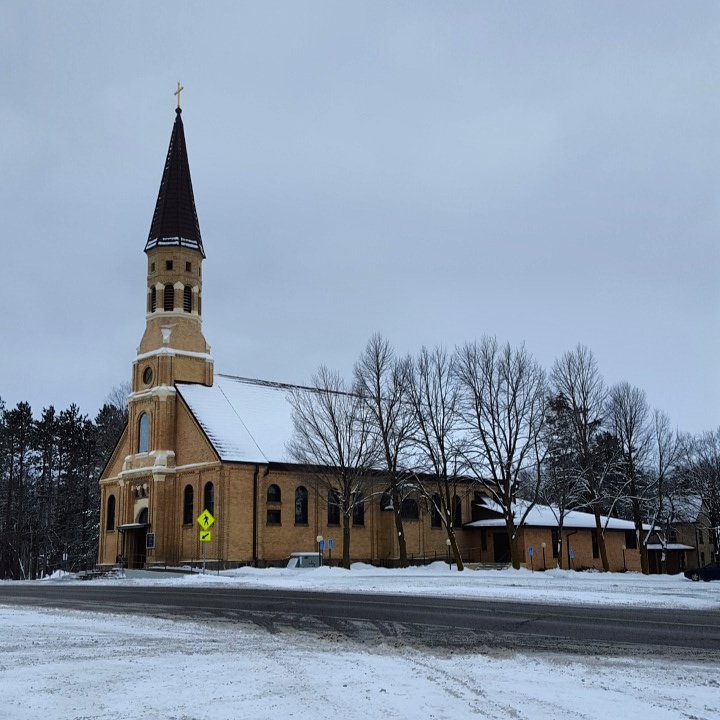
Catholic Church in St. Stephen.

Saint Stephen is a city in Stearns County, Minnesota, United States. The population was 797 at the 2020 census.

Saint Stephen is part of the Saint Cloud Metropolitan Statistical Area.

== History ==
St. Stephen was incorporated in 1914. The city was founded by Slovene immigrants. The city contains one property listed on the National Register of Historic Places: the 1903 Church of St. Stephen and its 1890 rectory.

== Geography ==
According to the United States Census Bureau, the city has a total area of 3.68 square miles (9.53 km^{2}), all land.

Main routes include Stearns County Roads 2 and 5. Stearns County Roads 1 and 17 are both nearby.

== Demographics ==
Historical population
Census	Pop.	Note	%±
1920	246		—
1930	229		−6.9%
1940	247		7.9%
1950	234		−5.3%
1960	276		17.9%
1970	331		19.9%
1980	453		36.9%
1990	607		34.0%
2000	860		41.7%
2010	851		−1.0%
2020	797		−6.3%
2022 (est.)	800		0.4%
U.S. Decennial Census; 2020 Census

=== 2010 census ===
As of the census of 2010, there were 851 people, 305 households, and 234 families living in the city. The population density was 231.3 inhabitants per square mile (89.3/km^{2}). There were 316 housing units at an average density of 85.9 per square mile (33.2/km^{2}). The racial makeup of the city was 99.1% White, 0.1% Native American, 0.1% Pacific Islander, and 0.7% from two or more races. Hispanic or Latino of any race were 0.7% of the population.

There were 305 households, of which 42.0% had children under the age of 18 living with them, 65.9% were married couples living together, 6.2% had a female householder with no husband present, 4.6% had a male householder with no wife present, and 23.3% were non-families. 17.7% of all households were made up of individuals, and 6.2% had someone living alone who was 65 years of age or older. The average household size was 2.79 and the average family size was 3.19.

The median age in the city was 36.4 years. 30.1% of residents were under the age of 18; 6.3% were between the ages of 18 and 24; 28.4% were from 25 to 44; 23.9% were from 45 to 64; and 11.2% were 65 years of age or older. The gender makeup of the city was 51.6% male and 48.4% female.

=== 2000 census ===
As of the census of 2000, there were 860 people, 289 households, and 238 families living in the city. The population density was 233.9 inhabitants per square mile (90.3/km^{2}). There were 294 housing units at an average density of 80.0 per square mile (30.9/km^{2}). The racial makeup of the city was 99.07% White, and 0.93% from two or more races. Hispanic or Latino of any race were 1.05% of the population.

There were 289 households, out of which 51.2% had children under the age of 18 living with them, 73.7% were married couples living together, 4.2% had a female householder with no husband present, and 17.6% were non-families. 14.2% of all households were made up of individuals, and 4.8% had someone living alone who was 65 years of age or older. The average household size was 2.98 and the average family size was 3.31.

In the city, the population was spread out, with 32.9% under the age of 18, 7.0% from 18 to 24, 38.0% from 25 to 44, 15.0% from 45 to 64, and 7.1% who were 65 years of age or older. The median age was 31 years. For every 100 females, there were 108.2 males. For every 100 females age 18 and over, there were 106.1 males.

The median income for a household in the city was $55,078, and the median income for a family was $56,328. Males had a median income of $34,740 versus $25,313 for females. The per capita income for the city was $20,445. About 1.7% of families and 2.8% of the population were below the poverty line, including 2.6% of those under age 18 and 5.1% of those age 65 or over.

== Education ==
Saint Stephen is part of the Sartell-Saint Stephen School District 748.
