= St. Anthony, Stearns County, Minnesota =

City in Minnesota, United States

St. Anthony, Minnesota
- City
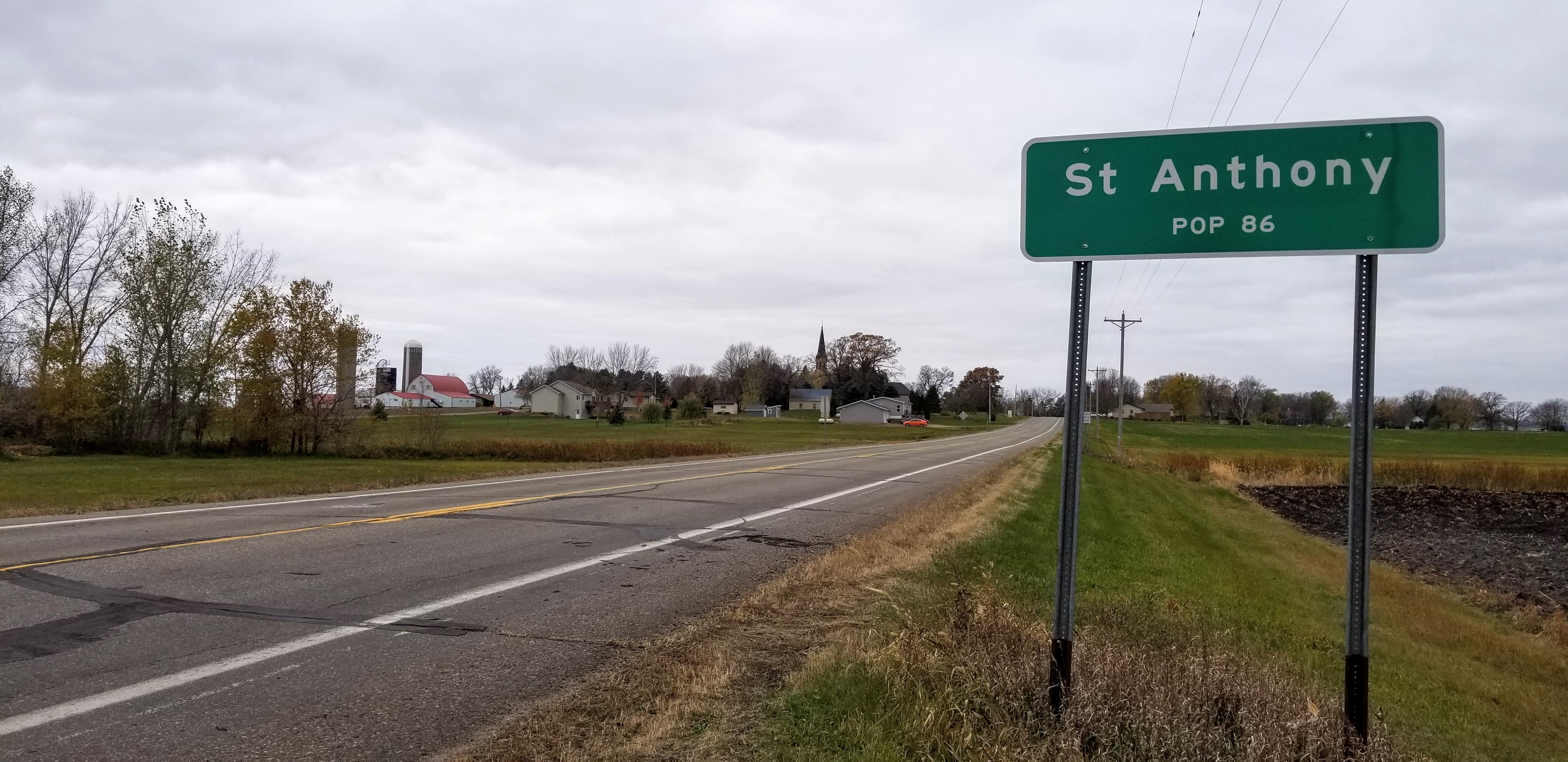
- St. Anthony, Stearns County

- Location of the city of St. Anthony within Stearns County, Minnesota
- Coordinates: 45°41′20″N 94°36′42″W
- Country: United States
- State: Minnesota
- County: Stearns
- Founded: 1880
- Incorporated: May 31, 1911

Government
  - Mayor: Robert Cremers

Area
  - Total: 0.493 sq mi (1.276 km^{2})
  - Land: 0.493 sq mi (1.276 km^{2})
  - Water: 0 sq mi (0.000 km^{2})
- Elevation: 1,273 ft (388 m)

Population (2020)
  - Total: 91
  - Estimate (2022): 92
  - Density: 184.5/sq mi (71.22/km^{2})
- Time zone: UTC–6 (Central (CST))
  - Summer (DST): UTC–5 (CDT)
- ZIP Code: 56307
- Area code: 320
- FIPS code: 27-56698
- GNIS feature ID: 2396472
- Sales tax: 7.125%

St. Anthony or Saint Anthony is a city in Stearns County, Minnesota, United States. The population was 91 at the 2020 census. It is part of the St. Cloud Metropolitan Statistical Area. Main routes include Minnesota State Highway 238, Stearns County Road 153, and Trobec Street.

== History ==
St. Anthony in Stearns County was settled circa 1880 and incorporated on May 31, 1911.

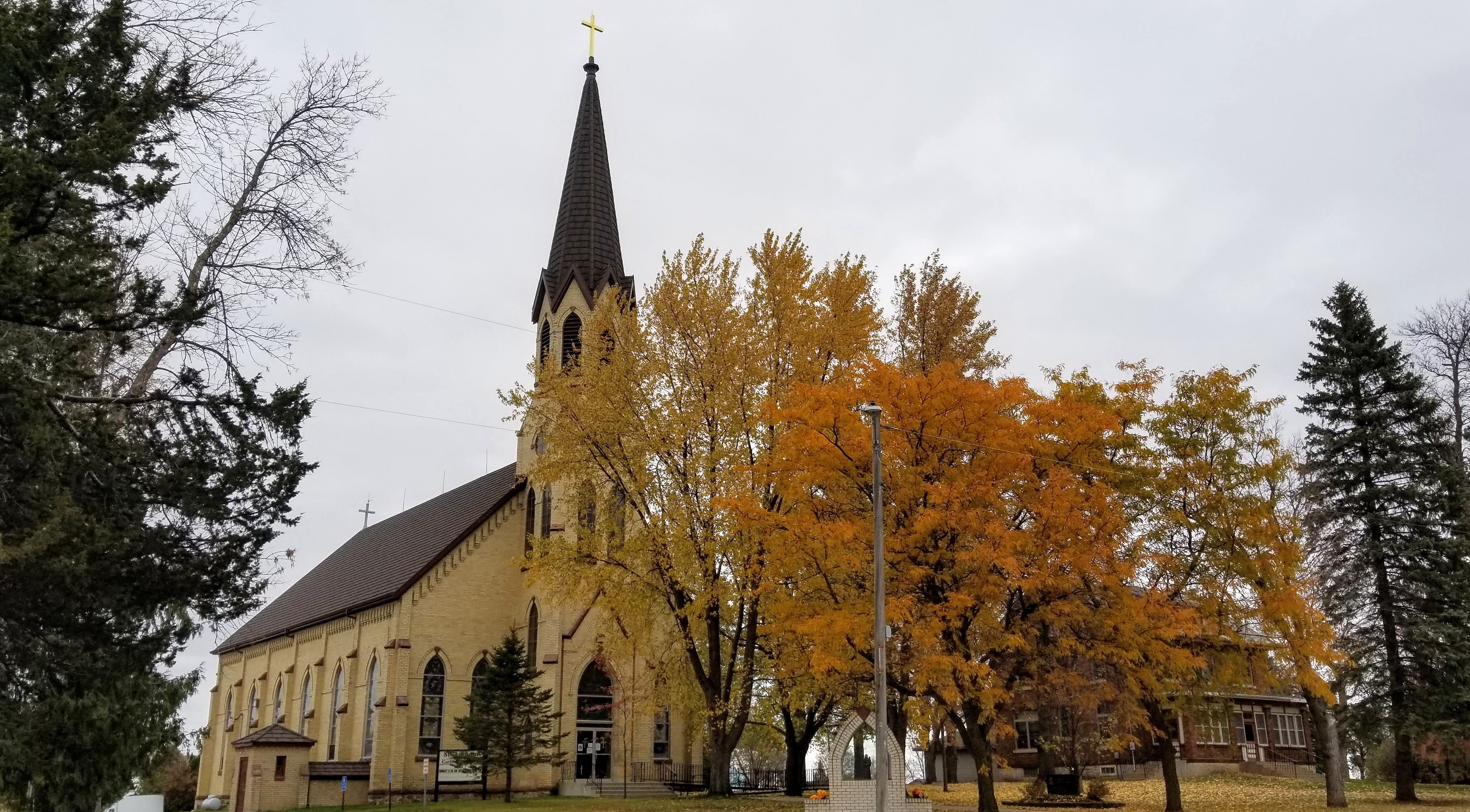
St. Anthony Catholic Church

== Geography ==
According to the United States Census Bureau, the city has a total area of 0.493 square miles (1.28 km^{2}), all land.

The city of St. Anthony is located within Krain Township geographically but is a separate entity. Nearby places include Albany and Freeport.

== Demographics ==
Historical population
Census	Pop.	Note	%±
1920	161		—
1930	62		−61.5%
1940	90		45.2%
1950	66		−26.7%
1960	72		9.1%
1970	66		−8.3%
1980	78		18.2%
1990	81		3.8%
2000	90		11.1%
2010	86		−4.4%
2020	91		5.8%
2022 (est.)	92		1.1%
U.S. Decennial Census; 2020 Census

=== 2010 census ===
As of the 2010 census, there were 86 people, 30 households, and 23 families living in the city. The population density was 175.5 inhabitants per square mile (67.8/km^{2}). There were 33 housing units at an average density of 67.3 per square mile (26.0/km^{2}). The racial makeup of the city was 98.8% White and 1.2% from other races. Hispanic or Latino of any race were 1.2% of the population.

There were 30 households, of which 43.3% had children under the age of 18 living with them, 73.3% were married couples living together, 3.3% had a male householder with no wife present, and 23.3% were non-families. 20.0% of all households were made up of individuals, and 10% had someone living alone who was 65 years of age or older. The average household size was 2.87 and the average family size was 3.39.

The median age in the city was 33.3 years. 36% of residents were under the age of 18; 5.9% were between the ages of 18 and 24; 34.9% were from 25 to 44; 15.2% were from 45 to 64; and 8.1% were 65 years of age or older. The gender makeup of the city was 47.7% male and 52.3% female.

=== 2000 census ===
As of the 2000 census there were 90 people, 32 households, and 24 families living in the city. The population density was 183.7 inhabitants per square mile (70.9/km^{2}). There were 36 housing units at an average density of 73.5 per square mile (28.4/km^{2}). The racial makeup of the city was 98.89% White, and 1.11% Asian. 81.9% were of German, 5.3% Irish and 5.3% Norwegian ancestry.

There were 32 households, out of which 37.5% had children under the age of 18 living with them, 71.9% were married couples living together, 3.1% had a female householder with no husband present, and 21.9% were non-families. 15.6% of all households were made up of individuals, and 6.3% had someone living alone who was 65 years of age or older. The average household size was 2.81 and the average family size was 3.16.

In the city, the population was spread out, with 24.4% under the age of 18, 11.1% from 18 to 24, 33.3% from 25 to 44, 20.0% from 45 to 64, and 11.1% who were 65 years of age or older. The median age was 32 years. For every 100 females, there were 95.7 males. For every 100 females age 18 and over, there were 88.9 males.

The median income for a household in the city was $29,107, and the median income for a family was $30,000. Males had a median income of $26,875 versus $18,750 for females. The per capita income for the city was $13,736. There were 8.3% of families and 15.2% of the population living below the poverty line, including 32.0% of under eighteens and 11.8% of those over 64.
