= Pulaski Institution =

American think tank

The Pulaski Institution
- Founder: Alan Elrod
- Type: Public policy think tank
- Tax ID no.: 862911972
- Headquarters: Little Rock, Arkansas
- President: Alan Elrod
- Website: www.pulaskiinstitution.org

The Pulaski Institution is an American liberal think tank founded by Alan Elrod which focuses on heartland regions.

== Political Positions ==
The Pulaski institution supports free trade, globalization and liberal democracy and is opposed to nationalism.
