= Leaving Home: A Collection of Lake Wobegon Stories =

1987 anthology by Garrison Keillor

- Dust jacket from the first edition
- Author: Garrison Keillor
- Language: English
- Series: Lake Wobegon
- Genre: Short story
- Publisher: Viking Penguin
- Publication date: 1987
- Publication place: United States
- Media type: Print (hardcover)
- Pages: 244
- ISBN: 0-670-81976-X
- OCLC: 16227460
- Dewey Decimal: 813/.54 19
- LC Class: PS3561.E3755 L43 1987
- Preceded by: Lake Wobegon Days
- Followed by: We Are Still Married

Leaving Home: A Collection of Lake Wobegon Stories is a short story anthology written by Garrison Keillor, a humorous fictional account of life in small-town Minnesota set in the fictitious heartland town of Lake Wobegon. It was first published in hardcover by Viking Penguin, Inc. in 1987.

The book is a collection of thirty-six of the author's "News from Lake Wobegon" monologues from his radio program A Prairie Home Companion, slightly revised for print publication. They are prefaced by "A Letter from Copenhagen." At the time of the book's initial publication, Keillor had left A Prairie Home Companion, and this was apparently a farewell to Lake Wobegon. He would, however, return to the program and to creating Lake Wobegon monologues in the 1990s.

== Contents ==
1. Untitled poem
2. "Introduction: A Letter from Copenhagen"
3. "A Trip to Grand Rapids"
4. "A Ten-dollar Bill"
5. "Easter"
6. "Corinne"
7. "A Glass of Wendy"
8. "The Speeding Ticket"
9. "Seeds"
10. "Chicken"
11. "How the Crab Apple Grew"
12. "Truckstop"
13. "Dale"
14. "High Rise"
15. "Collection"
16. "Life is Good"
17. "Lyle's Roof"
18. "Pontoon Boat"
19. "State Fair"
20. "David and Agnes, a Romance"
21. "The Killer"
22. "Eloise"
23. "The Royal Family"
24. "Homecoming"
25. "Brethren"
26. "Thanksgiving"
27. "Darlene Makes a Move"
28. "Christmas Dinner"
29. "Exiles"
30. "New Year's"
31. "Where Did It Go Wrong?"
32. "Post Office"
33. "Out in the Cold"
34. "Hawaii"
35. "Hansel"
36. "Du, Du Liegst Mir im Herzen"
37. "Aprille"
38. "Goodbye to the Lake"

== Reception ==
Spalding Gray, reviewing the collection in The New York Times, called its contents "perfect bedtime stories ... exactly the right length and mood to put you out at the end and not in the middle, so you can slip off with a well-rounded sense of joyful completion." He found them "primarily wholesome American images that often begin with a description of local weather and glide through a landscape of meat loaf, roasted wieners, homemade jam and unconditional love, all falling cozily into place like a Norman Rockwell painting," but "also perversely peppered with such contrasting earthy items as the autoignition of flatulence, cutting the heads off chickens, cancer and 68 dead pigs all on their backs with their legs turned up toward the sun. ... At their best these stories are contemporary folk tales of American comic-karma, always demonstrating that you reap what you sow. ... At their worst many of these stories are like honey-coated breakfast cereal. They give you a sugar rush only to let you crash by midmorning." He concludes "Leaving Home will most likely make Garrison Keillor's fans love him all the more. For you who don't like him or have not taken the time to shape an opinion, I recommend that you at least go to a bookstore and open the book to a story at random and read it while standing up. They're short enough to do that without getting tired. For some of you, they will make you remember the home you never had."
