= Happy to Be Here =

Short stories

- First edition cover
- Author: Garrison Keillor
- Language: English
- Publisher: Atheneum
- Publication date: 1981
- Publication place: United States
- Media type: Print (hardcover)
- Pages: x, 212 pp
- ISBN: 0-06-811201-7

Happy to Be Here is a collection of short stories by Garrison Keillor, first published in hardcover by Viking in 1981. It is Keillor's first published full-length book. Many of the stories first appeared in magazines Keillor wrote for between 1969 and 1981.

The work focuses mainly on the everyday lives of ordinary people, especially in Minnesota and North Dakota. Among them are musings about trains, baseball, politics, farming, marriage, and the rights of shy people.

== Contents ==
First publication in brackets, assume in The New Yorker unless stated otherwise. "The Tip-Top Club", "Jack Schmidt on the Burning Sands", "The New Washington: An Inside Story", "My Stepmother, Myself" and "After a Fall" did not appear in the first edition, but only from 1983. The 1983 edition also omits a 5-page introduction and moves two pieces: "Railroad Days" was after "Don" and "Shy Rights" was after "How It Was in America" in the first edition.

=== Part One ===
- "Jack Schmidt, Arts Administrator" (Apr 30, 1979) - An ex-private investigator describes his career change and the challenges he faces as an arts administrator in Minneapolis to thirty-seven arts organizations.
- "Don: The True Story of a Young Person" (May 30, 1977) - 17-year-old Don, lead singer of a punk rock group Trash must decide between his music and family as his group becomes infamous for supposedly eating a live chicken on stage.
- "WLT (The Edgar Era)" - (Apr 12, 1976) - An account of the early years of radio station WLT (With Lettuce and Tomato) founded in 1925 by Edgar and Roy Elmore to promote, Elmore Court, their up-market Minneapolis 'sandwich palace'. (This and the following three stories were early prototypes of incidents and characters that appeared in greatly altered form in Keillor's 1991 novel WLT: A Radio Romance).
- "The Slim Graves show" (Feb 10, 1973) - A fan tells of an early morning radio show sponsored by Sunrise Waffles in which the breakdown of Slim's marriage to Billie Ann is played out in front of the show's listeners who vote to decide whether Billie Ann should remain with Slim or leave him for 'Courteous Carl Harper the Guitar Man'.
- "Friendly Neighbor" (Dec 31, 1973) - The story of Walter "Dad" Bensons radio show on station WLT and later broadcast nationally, as told by his nephew on the occasion of the Dad Benson Friendship Dinner, held every other year, alternating between Chaffee, North Dakota (Dad's birthplace) and Freeport, Minnesota (where he died).
- "The Tip-top club" (The Atlantic Monthly, Aug 1981) - The history of a popular radio show on WLT, hosted by Bud Swenson for 25 years until his retirement 1969, and its subsequent decline.
- "Jack Schmidt on the Burning Sands" (Twin Cities, Jan 1981) - Jack Schmidt recounts being sacked from his position as an arts administrator followed by the revelation that 'oil money' from the Gulf States could resurrect his career.
- "My North Dakota Railroad Days" (Dec 01, 1975) - The story of the "Prairie Queen" an express rail service which ran east from Fargo, North Dakota told in retrospect by its conductor. The train ran for twelve years until disaster struck in 1942.

=== Part Two ===
- "Attitude" (Aug 27, 1979) - Criticizing the attitude of the players of a Slow-pitch softball team and suggesting rules to be followed.
- "Around the Horne" (Sep 30, 1974) - A sports journalist examines the failings of the local baseball team.
- "The New Baseball" (May 15, 1971) - Considers the future of baseball, extrapolating to absurd conclusions.
- "How Are the Legs, Sam" (Jan 30, 1971) - A man discusses his weaknesses as a baseball player

=== Part Three ===
- "The New Washington: An Inside Story" (Oct 26, 1981) - On a bus tour to see the extreme decadence of the Reagan administration, Vice President George Bush is in disguise.
- "U.S. Still on Top, Says Rest of World" (Oct 2, 1971) - It's 1971 and for the 28th year running, the United States is named Number One Country as voted for by the Association of World Leaders.
- "Congress in Crisis: The Proximity Bill" (7 Apr 1973) - Congressmen are being manhandled by dissident individuals and so plan a draconian bill to prevent such contact.
- "Re the Tower Project" (28 Aug 1971) - The company reassures its personnel that the Tower project in Washington will still go ahead.
- "How It Was in America a Week Ago Tuesday" (10 Mar 1975) - Considers a magazine article attempting to reflect the myriad different events occurring across America one Tuesday.
- "Mission to Mandala" (May 25, 1981) - Army comic book parody including letters to the editors and their replies.
- "Nana Hami Ba Reba" (Feb 4, 1980) - The narrator is responsible for the total metrification of America in 1984, including time and language (of which the story title is an example) but is finding hard to cope with the latest changes.

=== Part Four ===
- "My Stepmother, Myself" (The Atlantic Monthly, Mar 1982) As step-mothers face increasing discrimination, a case is made in their defence, with testimony from Snow White, Gretel and Cinderella.
- "Plainfolks" (Nov 4, 1974) - Excerpts from a 12th grade project interviewing local people covering subjects like bookcases, smoke rings, snowmen, model railways and car customization.
- "People's Shopper" (Feb 24, 1973) - Statements from various local alternative forward-thinking establishments.
- "Your Wedding and You" (Jun 16, 1975) - Discusses the trend for 'new weddings' and 'alternative weddings' with specific examples.
- "Shy Rights: Why Not Pretty Soon" - A call (albeit a quiet one) for the rights of shy people to be recognized. (online)
- "Lowliest Bush a Purple Sage would be" - The world of nature, literally speaking to poets who are willing to listen.
- "Local Family Keeps Son Happy" (1970) - A live in prostitute is hired by a family for their 16-year-old son.
- "Oya Life These Days" (17 Feb 1975) - Anthropological study of the Oya people is made difficult by their tendency to gather round the scholar asking questions.
- "Your Transit Commission" (The Atlantic Monthly, May 1981) - Innovative changes transform the bus service into 'an experience unto itself'.
- "Be Careful" (Aug 6, 1979) - After fears over the fall of Skylab, a plea for people to eliminate danger in their daily lives.
- "Ten Stories for Mr. Richard Brautigan, and Other Stories" (18 Mar 1972) - Ten vignettes in the style of Richard Brautigan.

=== Part Five ===
- "After a Fall" (Jun 21, 1982) - the author recounts the real and imagined dangers of falling for tall people, from personal experience.
- "Drunkard's Sunday" (28 Feb 1982) - The highs and lows of a drunkard's typical Sunday.
- "Happy to Be Here" (Sep 18, 1971, as Found Paradise) - A writer moves from the city to a farm and adjusts his writing style to suit.
- "Drowning 1954" (16 Aug 1976) - After the narrator's cousin drowns in Lake Independence, his mother insists he takes twice-weekly swimming lessons, but instead he watches Cedric Adams in a WCCO radio show.
