= Happy to Be Here (disambiguation) =

Happy to Be Here is a 1981 collection of short stories.

Happy to Be Here may also refer to:

- Happy to Be Here (EP), a 2024 EP by Bodie
- "Happy to Be Here" (Homicide: Life on the Street), a 1994 television episode
- Happy 2 Be Here, a 2020 album by Ant Clemons
