= Pontoon: A Novel of Lake Wobegon =

2007 novel by Garrison Keillor

- Dust-jacket from first edition
- Author: Garrison Keillor
- Language: English
- Series: Lake Wobegon
- Genre: Novel
- Publisher: Viking Press
- Publication date: 2007
- Publication place: United States
- Media type: Print (Hardcover)
- Pages: 256 pp
- ISBN: 0-670-06356-8
- OCLC: 124166751
- Preceded by: Lake Wobegon Summer 1956

Pontoon: A Novel of Lake Wobegon is a novel by Garrison Keillor, a humorous fictional account of life in the fictitious heartland town of Lake Wobegon, Minnesota. It was first published in hardcover by Viking Press in September 2007.

Lake Wobegon is one of the habitats of the radio show Prairie Home Companion.

== Plot ==
The novel begins with the death of 81-year-old Evelyn Peterson in her sleep. Evelyn was a widow who had a reputation for staying positive yet straightforward with the way she lived life in her later years, in direct counter to the negative and passive-aggressive personalities of the Lake Wobegon townsfolk. Barbara, Evelyn's daughter, discovers her mother's body the next morning. Barbara is divorced, works as a school lunchlady, and lives a life troubled by her past and complicated by recurring alcoholism. The death is a shock, since Evelyn had been in seemingly-great health in the days prior. Barbara soon notifies both her overbearing aunt Flo, and her son Kyle, a college student at the University of Minnesota-Twin Cities.

Going through her mother's personal effects, Barbara soon comes across two huge tidbits of information. One is a last will and testament, in which Evelyn instructs that her body be cremated and her ashes stuffed into a hollowed-out bowling ball, to be thrown into Lake Wobegon. This is to the deep chagrin of Flo, yet to the delight of Kyle, who offers to drop the bowling ball from a mid-air para-sail. The second is a voicemail left the night before by a man named Raoul Olson, a retired entertainer who lives in Minneapolis, and, as Barbara discovers, an on-again, off-again flame whom her mother had been seeing for years without anyone's knowledge. Barbara makes a trip to Minneapolis to look for Raoul and inform him of Evelyn's death. He reminisces, both on the voicemail and to Barbara, of how he and Evelyn met, and how they would meet again, especially after the death of Evelyn's estranged husband, Jack, from a heart attack. Reliving her mother's later years, as well as assessing her life for what it is and how far it's come, Barbara quits alcohol cold turkey and declares herself to be an atheist. (She apparently forgets this in times of stress, however, sometimes praying frantically during emergencies.)

Meanwhile, Debbie Detmer, in her 30s and living and working in California at an alternative pet health store, returns to Lake Wobegon for her marriage to Brent, an arrogant CEO of a private jet rental company. Debbie's father, the former CEO of an energy company, suffers from the lingering effects of a concussion from a fall in his bathroom, leaving her mother to take care of him. When Brent arrives to Lake Wobegon, he is none too pleased with the backwards nature of the town, not to mention the lack of cellular coverage, and has a poor attitude, which Debbie tries to manage during her time home. Eventually, plans for the marriage fall apart after Debbie gets fed up with Brent's attitude about the trip, Lake Wobegon, and her family. Additionally, Kyle makes the snap decision to leave his girlfriend Sarah and to quit college, but has a car accident on the way back to Lake Wobegon. He is uninjured, but his brush with death causes him to reevaluate his life.

Having read some her mother's old papers, Barbara realizes that she is Raoul's biological daughter, and tells him this.

After a memorial service, Kyle gets ready to para-sail over the Lake to deposit Evelyn's ashes. Due to a series of mishaps (which include a burning hot-air balloon, two giant duck decoys, and a capsizing pontoon boat that dumps two dozen visiting pastors from Denmark into the lake), Kyle ends up airborne without any clothing at all, and narrowly escapes a fatal accident. Barbara convinces Kyle to return to the University of Minnesota, where he changes his major to history (eventually becoming a very successful author and lecturer).

A few years later, having settled her mother's affairs, Barbara embarks optimistically upon a road trip in search of a new life, unsure when or if she will ever return to Lake Wobegon.

== History ==
In The Keillor Reader, in an exposition prior to an excerpt of the novel, Keillor wrote that the story for Pontoon originated from a storytelling tour he did in the early 90s to pay for a divorce.

== Reception ==
Thomas Mallon reviewed the book for the Sunday Book Review of the New York Times.
