= We Are Still Married: Stories & Letters =

Book by Garrison Keillor

- Dust jacket from the first edition (US)
- Author: Garrison Keillor
- Language: English
- Series: Lake Wobegon
- Genre: Short story
- Publisher: Viking Penguin (US); Faber & Faber (UK)
- Publication date: 1989
- Publication place: United States
- Media type: Print (hardcover)
- Pages: 330
- ISBN: 9780670826476
- OCLC: 18740437
- Dewey Decimal: 813/.54 19
- LC Class: PS3561.E3755 W4 1989
- Preceded by: Leaving Home: A Collection of Lake Wobegon Stories
- Followed by: Wobegon Boy

We Are Still Married: Stories & Letters is a collection of short stories and poems by Garrison Keillor, including several set in the fictitious heartland town of Lake Wobegon, Minnesota. It was first published in hardcover by Viking Penguin, Inc. in 1989. An expanded edition was published in 1990.

== Contents ==
- 1. Pieces.
  - "End of the trail"
  - "Three new twins join club in spring"
  - "Your book saved my life, Mister"
  - "Who we were and what we meant by it"
  - "The current crisis in remorse"
  - "The people vs Jim"
  - "The young Lutheran's guide to the orchestra"
  - "Maybe you can, too"
  - "A little help"
  - "A liberal reaches for her whip"
  - "Hollywood in the fifties"
  - "Lifestyle"
  - "He didn't go to Canada"
- 2. The lake.
  - "Letters from Jack"
  - "Three marriages"
    - "Mrs. Roy Tollerud to Mr. and Mrs. Floyd C. Olson"
    - "Mrs Ruth Luger to Mrs. Joanne Lienenkranz"
    - "Clarence Bunsen to his wife, Arlene"
  - "The babe"
  - "How I came to give the Memorial Day address at the Lake Wobegon Cemetery this year"
  - "Who do you think you are?"
- 3. Letters.
  - "How to write a letter"
  - "Estate"
  - "O the porch"
  - "Traveler"
  - "Sneezes"
  - "Pool table"
  - "Cold"
  - "Puck drop"
  - "Lutheran pie"
  - "Sexy"
  - "Regrets"
  - "The Pennsylvania Dept. of Agr."
  - "Family honeymoon"
  - "Home team"
  - "Basketball"
  - "Woodlawn"
  - "Episcopal"
  - "Nu er der jul igen"
  - "Glad bags"
  - "Hoppers"
  - "Mills "
  - "Atlanta Airport"
  - "The talk of the town squad"
  - "Subway"
  - "Gettysburg"
  - "Postcards"
  - "Nineteen"
  - "Patmos"
  - "Reagan"
  - "Laying on our backs looking up at the stars"
  - "The meaning of life"
  - "Stinson Beach"
- 4. House poems.
  - "O what a luxury"
  - "Lamour
  - "In memory of our cat, Ralph"
  - "The solo sock"
  - "Mrs. Sullivan"
  - "Guilt & shame"
  - "Obedience"
  - "Upon becoming a doctor"
  - "The old shower stall"
  - "Mother's poem"
  - "The Finn who would not take a sauna"
- 5. Stories.
  - "Meeting famous people"
  - "The lover of invention"
  - "Lonely boy"
  - "What did we do wrong?"
  - "Yon"
  - "The art of self-defense"
  - "End of an era"
  - "Glasnost"
  - "After a fall"
  - "My life in prison"
  - "We are still married"

== Reception ==
Bill Henderson, reviewing the collection in The New York Times, wrote:

The worst I could probably say about the 11 poems and 61 prose pieces brought together in We Are Still Married ... is that I liked some pieces better than others, but—and this is more than one can say for most such collections—I liked them all.
