= Lake Wobegon =

Fictional town created by Garrison Keillor

- Country: United States
- State: Minnesota
- County: Stearns
- Founder: Garrison Keillor

Lake Wobegon is a fictional town created by Garrison Keillor as the setting of the recurring segment "News from Lake Wobegon" for the radio program A Prairie Home Companion broadcast from Saint Paul, Minnesota. The fictional town serves as the setting for many of Keillor's stories and novels, gaining an international audience with Lake Wobegon Days in 1985. Described as a small rural town in central Minnesota, the events and adventures of the townspeople provided Keillor with a wealth of humorous and often touching stories.

Keillor has said that people often ask him if it is a real town, and when he replied that it was not, they seemed disappointed because "people want stories to be true". So he began to say it was in "central Minnesota, near Stearns County, up around Holdingford, not far from St. Rosa and Albany and Freeport, northwest of St. Cloud", which he says is "sort of the truth, I guess".

== Name ==
External videos
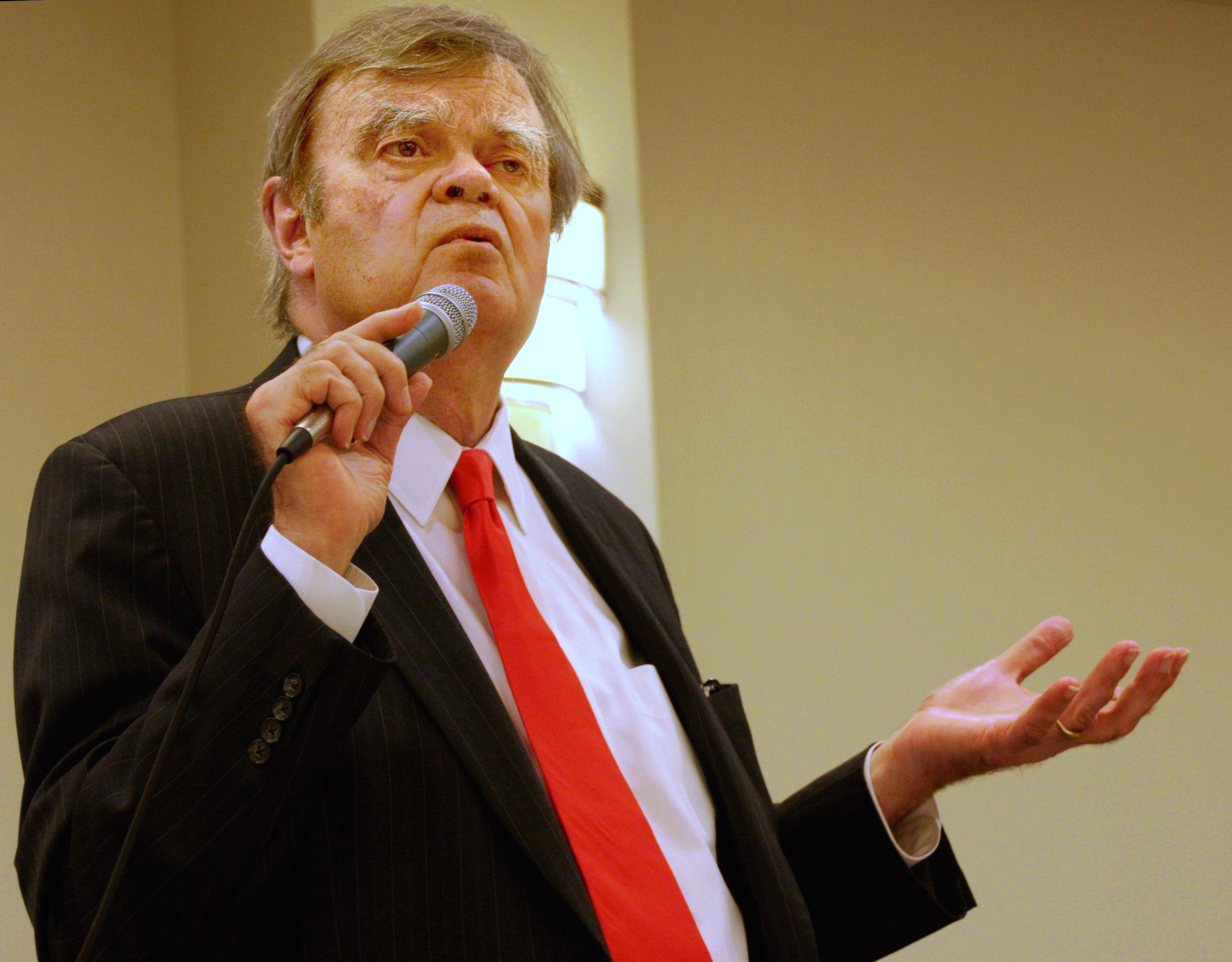
- The Origins of Lake Wobegon, Garrison Keillor, 8:22, May 14, 2014

Keillor has said the town's name comes from a (fictional) Native American word meaning "the place where we waited all day in the rain [for you]." Keillor explains, "Wobegon sounded Indian to me and Minnesota is full of Indian names. They mask the ethnic heritage of the town, which I wanted to do, since it was half Norwegian, half German." The English word woebegone means "affected with woe."

== Recurring monologue elements ==
Keillor's weekly monologue about Lake Wobegon included recurring elements:

- The typical monologue began: "Well, it's been a quiet week in Lake Wobegon, Minnesota, my hometown, out there on the edge of the prairie."
- Lake Wobegon was called "the little town that time forgot and the decades cannot improve."
- The monologue would close: "That's the news from Lake Wobegon, where all the women are strong, all the men are good-looking, and all the children are above average."

== Models ==
The fictional settlement Lake Wobegon resembles many small farm towns in the Upper Midwest, especially central and western Minnesota, North Dakota, and to some extent, northern Iowa, Wisconsin, eastern South Dakota and northeastern Montana. These are rural, sparsely populated areas that were settled only in the late 19th and early 20th centuries, largely by homesteading immigrants from Germany and Scandinavia. One of these, Holdingford, Minnesota, which Keillor said is "most Wobegonic", is on Stearns County's Lake Wobegon Regional Trail and advertises itself as the "Gateway to Lake Wobegon", even hosting a "Lake Wobegon Cafe."

Keillor formed most of his ideas for Lake Wobegon while working at public radio station KSJR on the campus of St. John's University in Collegeville, basing it on Avon, where he lived, and other local towns such as Albany, Freeport, Cold Spring, Richmond, Rockville, St. Joseph, St. Stephen, St. Wendell and Holdingford. Stearns County was predominantly German and Catholic in the 1970s, and the second-most Catholic county in the US (second only to New Orleans). To balance the religious and ethnic demography of Stearns County with the rest of Minnesota, Keillor "imported" Lutheran and Scandinavian elements into the town, making it more recognizable and therefore more interesting to the rest of the state.

== National location hints ==
Lake Wobegon is portrayed as the seat of Mist County, Minnesota, a tiny county near Minnesota's geographic center that supposedly does not appear on maps because of the "incompetence of surveyors who mapped out the state in the 19th century": the surveyors worked inward from the state's boundaries, and when they reached Lake Wobegon, had no room left for it on the map. The town's slogan is Gateway to Central Minnesota. Holdingford now has the same slogan.

Lake Wobegon is occasionally said to be near St. Olaf, Minnesota, a town referred to in the TV series The Golden Girls. (There is also a St. Olaf College in Northfield, Minnesota.) The town's school and amateur sports teams compete against the Uff-das of Upsala, a real town in southwest Morrison County, which is close to Holdingford. The town residents drink Wendy's Beer, brewed in St. Wendel, a real town in northeast Stearns County. The nearest good-sized town referred to in Keillor's monologues is St. Cloud. Lake Wobegon is sometimes compared favorably to a rival fictional town called Millet; a real town called Rice lies 20 miles north of St. Cloud.

Microsoft Virtual Earth returned a location northeast of St. Cloud when Lake Wobegon was entered into its search engine. The programs distributed at live performances of A Prairie Home Companion in 2005 had a map showing Lake Wobegon about two miles north of Holdingford, northwest of St. Cloud.

Keillor often refers to a cafe in downtown Lake Wobegon called the "Chatterbox Cafe". There was a real cafe and gas station in Olivia by that name, but it is now closed and abandoned, with nothing remaining to identify it but one sign. Olivia is in north-central Renville County.

The Minnesota Rails and Trails project began creating the Lake Wobegon Trail in 1998. It now stretches from Waite Park, Minnesota just west of St. Cloud, to Freeport, Minnesota, where it forks; one trail heads northwest to Osakis, Minnesota, the other northeast to Holdingford, Minnesota and Bowlus, Minnesota, and on across the Mississippi River. Keillor participated in the trail opening ceremonies and said that Holdingford was the most "Wobegonic" town in his mind. The Lake Wobegon Trail Marathon takes place every year in May on the trail. Runners leave from Holdingford and run to St. Joseph, Minnesota.

== History and character ==
Keillor chronicles a number of bizarre incidents in the fictional town's early history, akin to the events in Black River Falls in Wisconsin Death Trip.

Keillor identifies the original founders of what became Lake Wobegon as New England Unitarian missionaries, at least one of whom came to convert the Ojibwe through interpretive dance. A college was founded at what was then called New Albion, but the project was abandoned after a severe winter and numerous attacks by bears. The project had only one survivor, a very practical woman who married a French Canadian fur trapper who fed her in exchange for her help with the chores. This pragmatic couple were the founders of the current settlement.

New Albion's founders decided to settle at Lake Wobegon because they had gotten lost and did not know how to get back to where they had last been. To celebrate this, the colony's motto was Ubi Quid Ubi (Latin: "We're Here!...Where are we?"). Later the motto in the Lake Wobegon incorporated town seal is described as Sumus Quod Sumus (Latin: "We Are What We Are").

Most of the population are descendants of German immigrants, who are mostly members of the Catholic parish of Our Lady of Perpetual Responsibility, and descendants of Norwegian and Swedish immigrants, who attend Lake Wobegon Lutheran Church. Keillor's family were members of the Sanctified Brethren.

The 800 residents (1950 Census: 728) are proud of the Statue of the Unknown Norwegian (so called because the model left before the sculptor could get his name). Lake Wobegon is in competition with its fictional rival, St. Olaf, for having the most descendants of the same common ancestor. Lake Wobegon became a secret dumping ground of nuclear waste during the 1950s.

The fictional town is the home of the Whippets baseball team, tuna hotdish, snow, Norwegian bachelor farmers, ice fishing, tongues frozen to cold metal objects, and lutefisk—fish treated with lye which, after being reconstituted, is reminiscent of "the afterbirth of a dog or the world's largest chunk of phlegm." But it is also the home of the Mist County Fair, old-fashioned show yards with flowers "like Las Vegas showgirls", sweet corn, a magnificent grain elevator, and the pleasant lake itself.

== The Lake Wobegon effect ==
The Lake Wobegon effect is a common name for illusory superiority, a natural human tendency to overestimate one's capabilities. The characterization that "all the women are strong, all the men are good-looking, and the children are all above average" has been used to describe a real and pervasive human tendency to overestimate one's achievements and capabilities in relation to others. In one survey of high school students, only 2% of the students reported that they were below average in leadership ability. The authors of a study suggest that what they consider the "Lake Wobegon effect" can in some cases negatively affect doctors' treatment advice when, in planning treatment, doctors portray the patients as "above average".

Keillor himself has offered a contrarian opinion on the use of the term, observing that the effect does not actually apply in Lake Wobegon itself. In response to a listener query on the Prairie Home website, he pointed out that, in keeping with their Scandinavian heritage, Wobegonians prefer to downplay, rather than overestimate, their capabilities or achievements.

== Local life ==
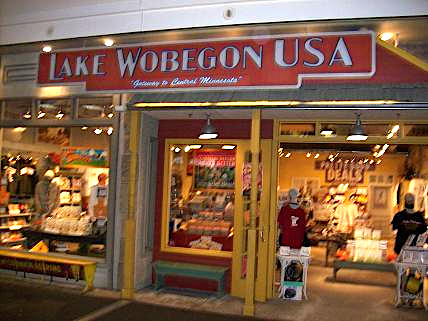
A real Lake Wobegon, USA "Gateway to Central Minnesota" retail store at Mall of America in Minnesota, prior to 2009

Businesses, organizations, and landmarks in Lake Wobegon include:

- Jack's Auto Repair, including Jack's School of Thought (correspondence), Warm Car Service, Dry Goods Emporium, Jack's Fountain Lounge, and Jack's Home, "a rest spa for people of all ages"
- Ralph's Pretty Good Grocery: "If you can't find it at Ralph's, you can probably get along (pretty good) without it."
- Bertha's Kitty Boutique ("for persons who care about cats")
- The Sidetrack Tap, run by Wally and Evelyn; "The dim little place in the dark where the pinball machine never tilts, the clock is a half-hour slow, and love never dies."
- The Chatterbox Café, "The place to go that's just like home."
- Café Boeuf, "Where the elite meet to greet and eat," with maitre d' Maurice.
- Art's Baits & Night o' Rest Motel (Art got sick of people being around, so you can't rent rooms there these days.)
- Our Lady of Perpetual Responsibility Roman Catholic Church; Father Emil (retired), Father Wilmer (current)
- Lake Wobegon Lutheran Church; Pastor Ingqvist (transferred), Pastor Barbara Ham (Interim Pastor), Pastor Liz (current)
- Bunsen Motors (Ford dealer), run by Clint and Clarence Bunsen, local Lutherans
- Krebsbach Chevrolet, run by Florian Krebsbach, local Catholic, and his son Carl.
- Moonlight Bay Supper Club
- Buck's Rent-a-Tux
- The Herald Star, town newspaper run by Harold Star
- Skoeglin's 5 and Dime
- LuAnne Magendanz's Bon Marché Beauty Parlor and Salon
- Co-op Hardware (formerly Bigger Hammer Hardware, from the joke: "If at first you don't succeed, try using a bigger hammer.")
- Clifford's (also known as "The Mercantile," which many residents still call it)
- The Sons of Knute Temple, Norwegian fraternal organization
- The Whippets, Town Team Baseball, "We'll Whip ya, whip ya good!"
- The Herdsmen, champion church ushering team
- The Curl Up and Dye, another local salon
- Tentative Point, (better known as Lover's Lane)
- Sons of Pitches, a men's chorus made up of the Original Main Street's finest in the Home of Sinclair Lewis
- Lake Wobegon Piles ("twin 18-foot-high islands in the center of Lake Wobegon" created in 1956)
- Mist County Historical Society Museum
- Wally "Old Hard Hands" Bunsen Memorial Field (where The Whippets whip 'em all)
- Lake Wobegon Loons (five-man football)
- Powdermilk Biscuit Plant (on the road to Worthington)
- Lake Wobegon High School
  - Lake Wobegon Leonards high school sports teams
- Municipal Sanitary Landfill
- Statue of the Unknown Norwegian
- Farmer's Union Grain Elevator
- Bob's Bank, in the green mobile home
- World's Largest Pile of Burlap Bags (created by Earl Dickmeyer to fund his and his wife's move to Fort Myers, Florida, and the centerpiece for a mysterious cure to ailments, such as kidney stones)

== In literature ==
Keillor has written several semi-autobiographical books about life in Lake Wobegon, including:

- Lake Wobegon Days (1985), ISBN 0-14-013161-2; a recorded version of this won a Grammy Award for Best Spoken Word or Non-Musical Recording in 1988
- Leaving Home: a Collection of Lake Wobegon Stories (1987), ISBN 0-670-81976-X
- We Are Still Married: Stories & Letters (1989; collection including some Lake Wobegon stories), ISBN 0-670-82647-2
  - An expanded edition was released in 1990 that added six stories and removed one from the original publication. ISBN 978-0-140-13156-7
- Wobegon Boy (1997), ISBN 0-670-87807-3; a recorded version of this was nominated for a Grammy Award for Best Spoken Word Album in 1999
- Lake Wobegon Summer 1956 (2001), ISBN 0-571-21014-7; a recorded version of this was nominated for a Grammy Award for Best Spoken Word Album in 2002
- In Search of Lake Wobegon (Photographs by Richard Olsenius, 2001), ISBN 978-0-670-03037-8
- Pontoon: A Novel of Lake Wobegon (2007), ISBN 0-670-06356-8
- Liberty: A Novel of Lake Wobegon (2008), ISBN 0-670-01991-7
- Life among the Lutherans (2009), ISBN 978-0-8066-7061-4
- Pilgrims: A Wobegon Romance (2009), ISBN 978-0-670-02109-3
- The Lake Wobegon Virus (2020), ISBN 9781951627676
- Boom Town: a Lake Wobegon novel (2022), ISBN 978-1-7330745-5-1

== In pop culture ==
- The 1993 The Simpsons episode Marge on the Lam opens with the Simpson family watching public television; a Keilloresque host delivers a monologue about a town named Badger Falls, "where the men are pink-cheeked, the women are robust, and the children are pink-cheeked and robust."
- Forensic Files - The t-shirt worn by the killer John Famalaro that was entered into evidence in the murder of Denise Hueber was a Lake Wobegon t-shirt.
- In Season 7, episode 7, of The Office ("The Christening") Erin Hannon tunes into A Prairie Home Companion on the car radio when picking up Michael Scott, Andy Bernard and a church kid from the side of the road.
- In the 1984 Garfield animated TV special "Garfield in the Rough", Garfield, Jon, and Odie hear a radio news bulletin about a panther that has escaped from a local zoo earlier that morning and been reported in the "Lake Wobegon area".
- Encryption software Pretty Good Privacy is named for Ralph's Pretty Good Grocery.

== See also ==
- Lake Wobegon Trails, two paved recreational rail trails in central Minnesota named after the fictional Lake Wobegon in Garrison Keillor's Prairie Home Companion
- Lake Wobegon Marathon, marathon that is run along the Wobegon trail from Holdingford to St. Joseph
- Lake Ore-be-gone
