= Lake Wobegon Days =

1985 novel by Garrison Keillor

- Dust-jacket from first edition
- Author: Garrison Keillor
- Language: English
- Series: Lake Wobegon
- Publisher: Viking
- Publication date: 1985
- Publication place: United States
- Media type: Print (Hardcover)
- Pages: x, 337 pp
- ISBN: 978-0-670-80514-3
- OCLC: 11971882
- Followed by: Leaving Home: a Collection of Lake Wobegon Stories

Lake Wobegon Days is a novel by Garrison Keillor, first published in hardcover by Viking in 1985. Based on material from his radio show A Prairie Home Companion, the book brought Keillor's work to a much wider audience and achieved international success selling over 1 million copies. Like some of Keillor's other books, it is unusual in that it could be said that the audiobook preceded the publication in written form.

The work is a humorous account of life in fictitious Lake Wobegon, Minnesota, a heartland small town. Its early chapters are written in the form and style of a history of the town and later ones chronicle the lives, concerns, and activities of its inhabitants, with inter-generational tensions and relationships forming a major theme. Most of the latter material was originally delivered on radio in the form of monologues. Due to the nature of the original material, the second half of the novel has many recurring characters but little in the way of plot, resembling an incompletely integrated group of short stories.

== Reception ==
In his Los Angeles Times review Richard Eder describes the book as being "filled with good things, but it has its problems". Eder goes on to say that "It is a pastiche, and a very talented one; but there are times when the whimsy frays." Barth Healey however, describes it as "a genuine work of American history" in his New York Times Book Review.
