= Garrison Keillor =

American author, singer, and media personality (born 1942)

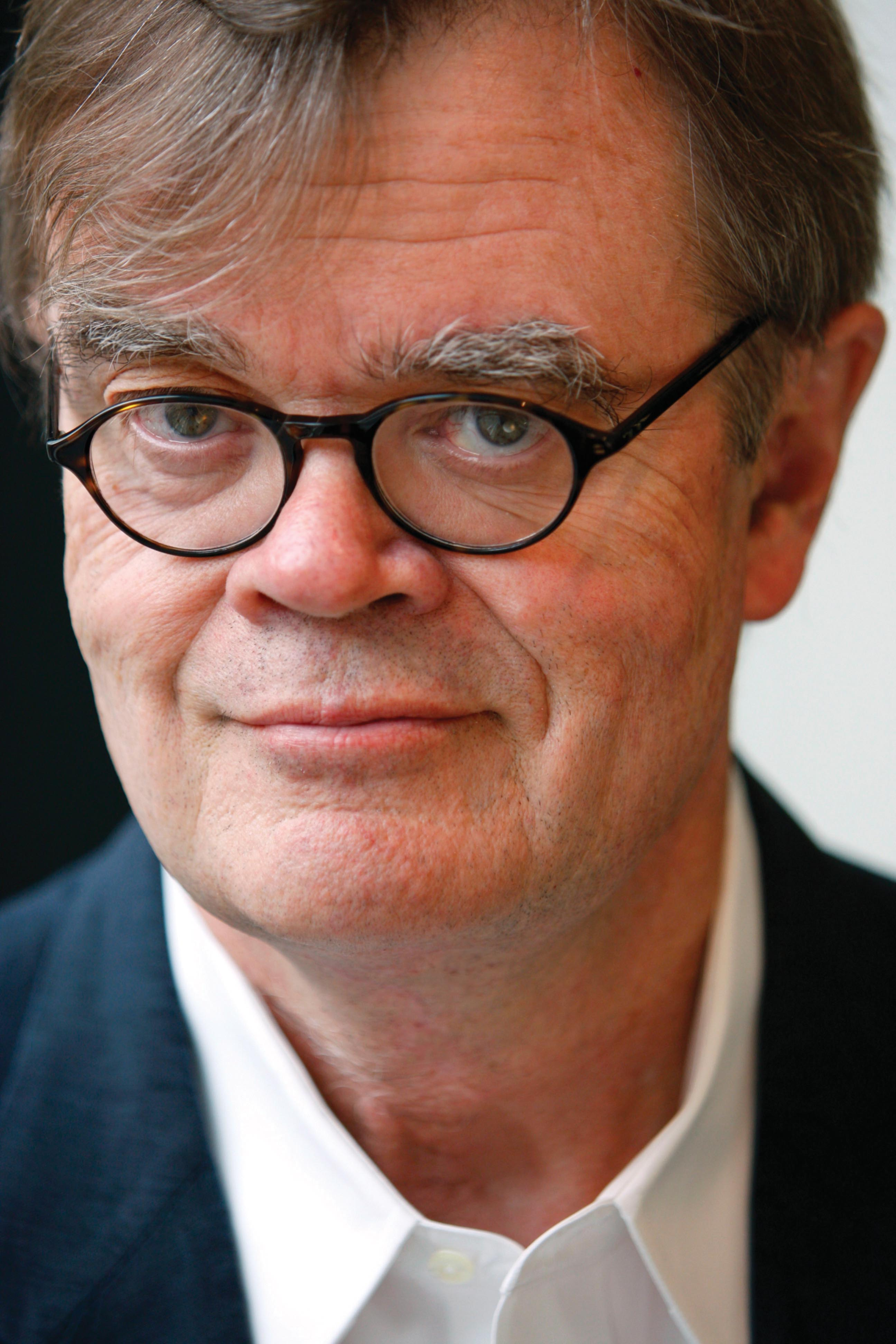
- Keillor in 2009
- Born: Gary Edward Keillor; August 7, 1942 (age 84); Anoka, Minnesota, U.S.
- Education: University of Minnesota (BA)
- Spouses: Mary Guntzel (m. 1965; div. 1976) Ulla Skaerved (m. 1985; div. 1990) Jenny Lind Nilsson (m. 1995)
- Children: 2

Comedy career
- Years active: 1969–present
- Medium: Radio; print; film
- Genres: Observational comedy; storytelling
- Subjects: American culture (particularly the Midwest); American politics
- Website: garrisonkeillor.com

Gary Edward "Garrison" Keillor (/ˈkiːlər/; born August 7, 1942) is an American author, singer, humorist, voice actor, and radio personality. He created the Minnesota Public Radio (MPR) show A Prairie Home Companion (called Garrison Keillor's Radio Show in some international syndication), which he hosted from 1974 to 2016. Keillor created the fictional Minnesota town Lake Wobegon, the setting of many of his books, including Lake Wobegon Days and Leaving Home: A Collection of Lake Wobegon Stories. Other creations include Guy Noir, a detective voiced by Keillor who appeared in A Prairie Home Companion comic skits. Keillor is also the creator of the five-minute daily radio/podcast program The Writer's Almanac, which pairs poems of his choice with a script about important literary, historical, and scientific events that coincided with that date in history.

In November 2017, MPR cut all business ties with Keillor after an allegation of inappropriate behavior with a freelance writer for A Prairie Home Companion. Internal and external investigations by MPR concluded Keillor had engaged in dozens of sexually inappropriate incidents over a period of years, including unwanted sexual touching. On April 13, 2018, MPR and Keillor announced a settlement that allows archives of A Prairie Home Companion and The Writer's Almanac to be publicly available again, and soon thereafter, Keillor began publishing new episodes of The Writer's Almanac on his website. He also continues to tour a stage version of A Prairie Home Companion; these shows are not broadcast by National Public Radio or American Public Media.

== Early life and education ==
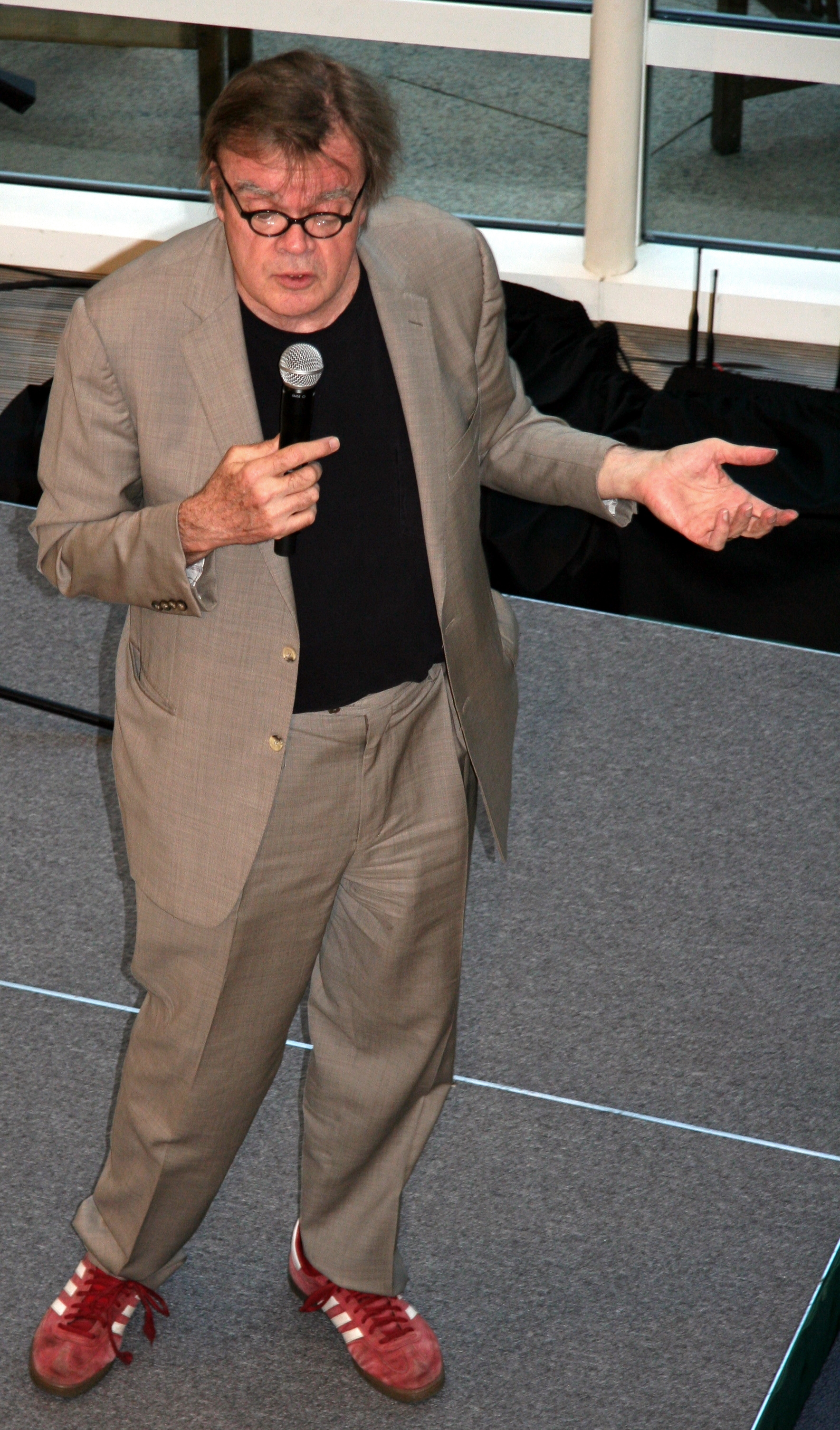
Keillor in 2010, wearing his signature red shoes

Keillor was born in Anoka, Minnesota, the son of Grace Ruth (née Denham) and John Philip Keillor. His father was a carpenter and postal worker of English ancestry; Keillor's paternal grandfather was from Kingston, Ontario. His maternal grandparents were Scottish emigrants from Glasgow. He was the third of six children, with three brothers and two sisters.

Keillor's family belonged to the Plymouth Brethren, an Evangelical Christian movement that he has since left. In 2006, he told Christianity Today that he was attending the St. John the Evangelist Episcopal church in Saint Paul, Minnesota, after previously attending a Lutheran church in New York.

Keillor graduated from Anoka High School in 1960 and from the University of Minnesota with a bachelor's degree in English in 1966. During college, he began his broadcasting career on the student-operated radio station known today as Radio K.

In his 2004 book Homegrown Democrat: A Few Plain Thoughts from the Heart of America, Keillor mentions some of his noteworthy ancestors, including John Crandall, who was an associate of Roger Williams, who founded Rhode Island and the first American Baptist church; and Prudence Crandall, who founded the first African-American women's school in America.

== Career ==
=== Radio ===
Garrison Keillor started his professional radio career in November 1969 with Minnesota Educational Radio (MER), later Minnesota Public Radio (MPR), which today distributes programs under the American Public Media (APM) brand. He hosted a weekday drive-time broadcast called A Prairie Home Entertainment, on KSJR FM at St. John's University in Collegeville. The show's eclectic music was a major divergence from the station's usual classical fare. During this time he submitted fiction to The New Yorker magazine, where his first story for that publication, "Local Family Keeps Son Happy," appeared in September 1970.

Keillor resigned from The Morning Program in February 1971 in protest of what he considered interference with his musical programming; as part of his protest, he played nothing but the Beach Boys' "Help Me, Rhonda" during one broadcast. When he returned to the station in October, the show was dubbed A Prairie Home Companion.

Keillor has attributed the idea for the live Saturday night radio program to his 1973 assignment to write about the Grand Ole Opry for The New Yorker, but he had already begun showcasing local musicians on the morning show, despite limited studio space. In August 1973, MPR announced plans to broadcast a Saturday night version of A Prairie Home Companion with live musicians.

A Prairie Home Companion (PHC) debuted as an old-style variety show before a live audience on July 6, 1974; it featured guest musicians and a cadre cast doing musical numbers and comic skits replete with elaborate live sound effects. The show was punctuated by spoof commercial spots for PHC fictitious sponsors such as Powdermilk Biscuits, the Ketchup Advisory Board, and the Professional Organization of English Majors (POEM); it presented parodic serial melodramas, such as The Adventures of Guy Noir, Private Eye and The Lives of the Cowboys. Keillor voiced Noir, the cowboy Lefty, and other recurring characters, and provided lead or backup vocals for some of the show's musical numbers. The show aired from the Fitzgerald Theater in St. Paul.

After the show's intermission, Keillor read clever and often humorous greetings to friends and family at home submitted by members of the theater audience in exchange for an honorarium. Also in the second half of the show, Keillor delivered a monologue called The News from Lake Wobegon, a fictitious town based in part on Keillor's hometown of Anoka, Minnesota, and on Freeport and other small towns in Stearns County, Minnesota, where he lived in the early 1970s. Lake Wobegon is a quintessentially Minnesota small town characterized by the narrator as a place "... where all the women are strong, all the men are good-looking, and all the children are above average."

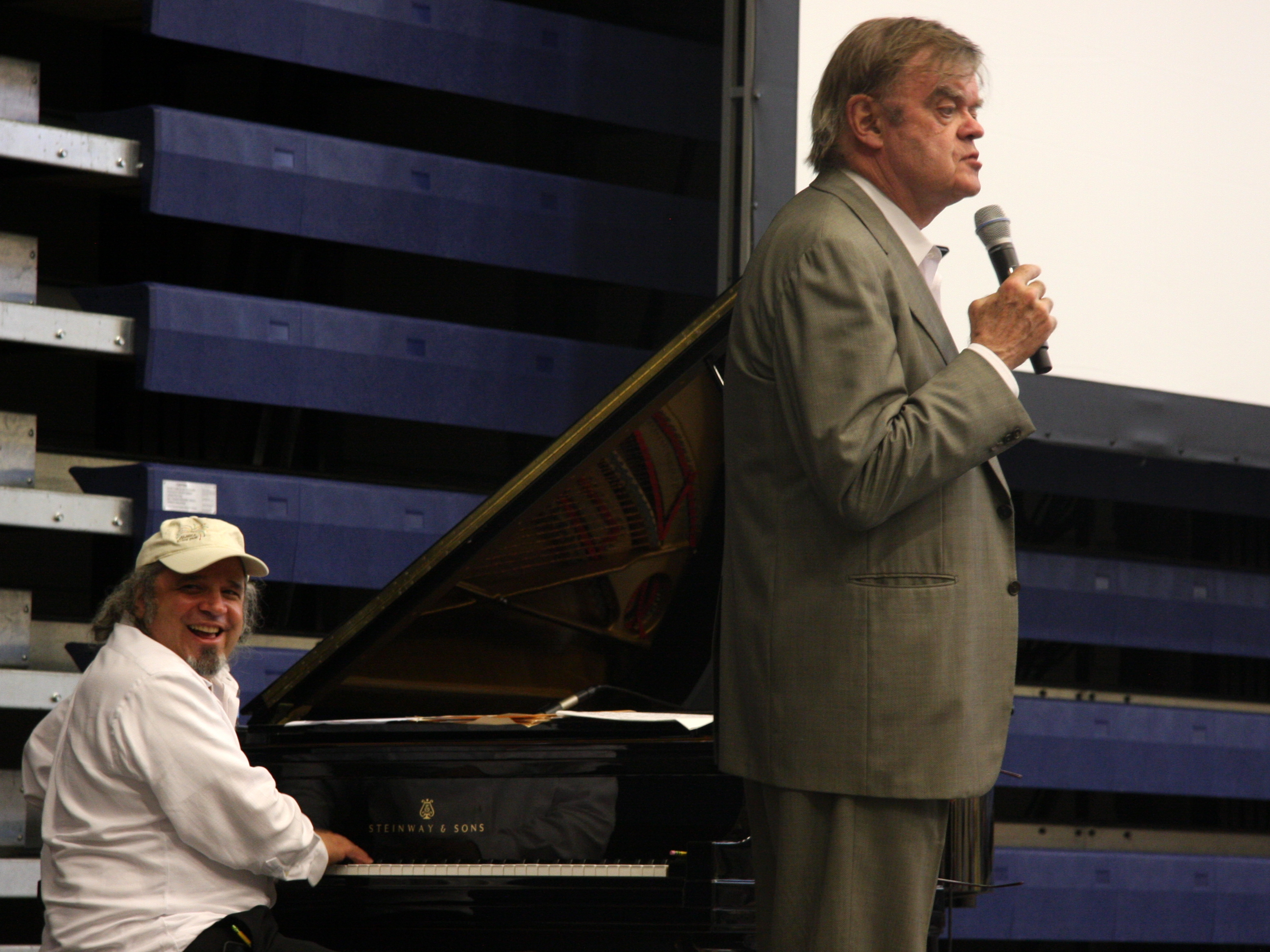
Keillor with Richard Dworsky in 2014 on the 40th anniversary of A Prairie Home Companion

The original PHC ran until 1987, when Keillor ended it to focus on other projects. In 1989, he launched a new live radio program from New York City, The American Radio Company of the Air, which had essentially the same format as PHC. In 1992, he moved ARC back to St. Paul, and a year later changed the name back to A Prairie Home Companion; it remained a fixture of Saturday night radio broadcasting for decades.

On a typical broadcast of A Prairie Home Companion, Keillor's name was not mentioned unless a guest addressed him by name, although some sketches featured Keillor as his alter ego, Carson Wyler. In the closing credits, which Keillor read, he gave himself no billing or credit except "written by Sarah Bellum," a joking reference to his own brain.

Keillor regularly took the radio company on the road to broadcast from popular venues around the United States; the touring production typically featured local celebrities and skits incorporating local color. In April 2000, he took the program to Edinburgh, Scotland, producing two performances in the city's Queen's Hall, which were broadcast by BBC Radio. He toured Scotland with the program to celebrate its 25th anniversary. (In the UK, Ireland, Australia, and New Zealand, the program is known as Garrison Keillor's Radio Show.) Keillor produced broadcast performances similar to A Prairie Home Companion but without the "Prairie Home Companion" brand, as in his 2008 appearance at the Oregon Bach Festival. He was also the host of The Writer's Almanac, from 1993 to 2017, which, like A Prairie Home Companion, was produced and distributed by American Public Media.

In a March 2011 interview, Keillor announced that he would be retiring from A Prairie Home Companion in 2013; but in a December 2011 interview with the Sioux City Journal, Keillor said: "The show is going well. I love doing it. Why quit?" During an interview on July 20, 2015, Keillor announced his intent to retire from the show after the 2015–2016 season, saying, "I have a lot of other things that I want to do. I mean, nobody retires anymore. Writers never retire. But this is my last season. This tour this summer is the farewell tour."

Keillor's final episode of the show was recorded live for an audience of 18,000 fans at the Hollywood Bowl in California on July 1, 2016, and broadcast the next day, ending 42 seasons of the show. After the performance, President Barack Obama phoned Keillor to congratulate him. The show continued on October 15, 2016, with Chris Thile as its host.

==== Sexual harassment allegations and separation from MPR ====
On November 29, 2017, the Star Tribune reported that Minnesota Public Radio was terminating all business relationships with Keillor as a result of "allegations of his inappropriate behavior with an individual who worked with him." In January 2018, MPR CEO Jon McTaggart elaborated that they had received allegations of "dozens" of sexually inappropriate incidents from the individual, including requests for sexual contact. Keillor denied any wrongdoing and said his firing stems from an incident when he touched a woman's bare back while trying to console her. He said he had apologized to her soon after, that they had already made up, and that he was surprised to hear the allegations when her lawyer called.

In its statement of termination, MPR announced that Keillor would keep his executive credit for the show, but that since he owns the trademark for the phrase "prairie home companion", they would cease rebroadcasting episodes of A Prairie Home Companion featuring Keillor and remove the trademarked phrase from the radio show hosted by Chris Thile. MPR also eliminated its business connections to PrairieHome.org and stopped distributing Keillor's daily program The Writer's Almanac. The Washington Post also canceled Keillor's weekly column when they learned he had continued writing columns, including a controversial piece criticizing Al Franken's resignation because of sexual misconduct allegations, without revealing that he was under investigation at MPR.

Several fans wrote MPR to protest Keillor's firing, but only 153 members canceled their memberships because of it. In January 2018, Keillor announced he was in mediation with MPR over the firing. On January 23, 2018, MPR News reported further on the investigation after interviewing almost 60 people who had worked with Keillor. The story described other alleged sexual misconduct by Keillor, and a $16,000 severance check for a woman who was asked to sign a confidentiality agreement to prevent her from talking about her time at MPR (she refused and never deposited the check).

==== Settlement and access to archived shows ====
Keillor received a letter from the MPR CEO, Jon McTaggart, dated April 5, 2018, confirming that both sides wanted archives of A Prairie Home Companion and The Writer's Almanac to be publicly available again. In April 2018, MPR and Keillor announced a settlement under which MPR would restore the online archives.

==== Finding Your Roots segment ====
Also due to the allegations of inappropriate behavior, Keillor's segment in the PBS series Finding Your Roots episode that aired on December 19, 2017, was replaced by an older segment featuring Maya Rudolph.

=== Writing ===
At age 13, Keillor adopted the pen name "Garrison" to distinguish his personal life from his professional writing. He commonly uses "Garrison" in public and in other media.

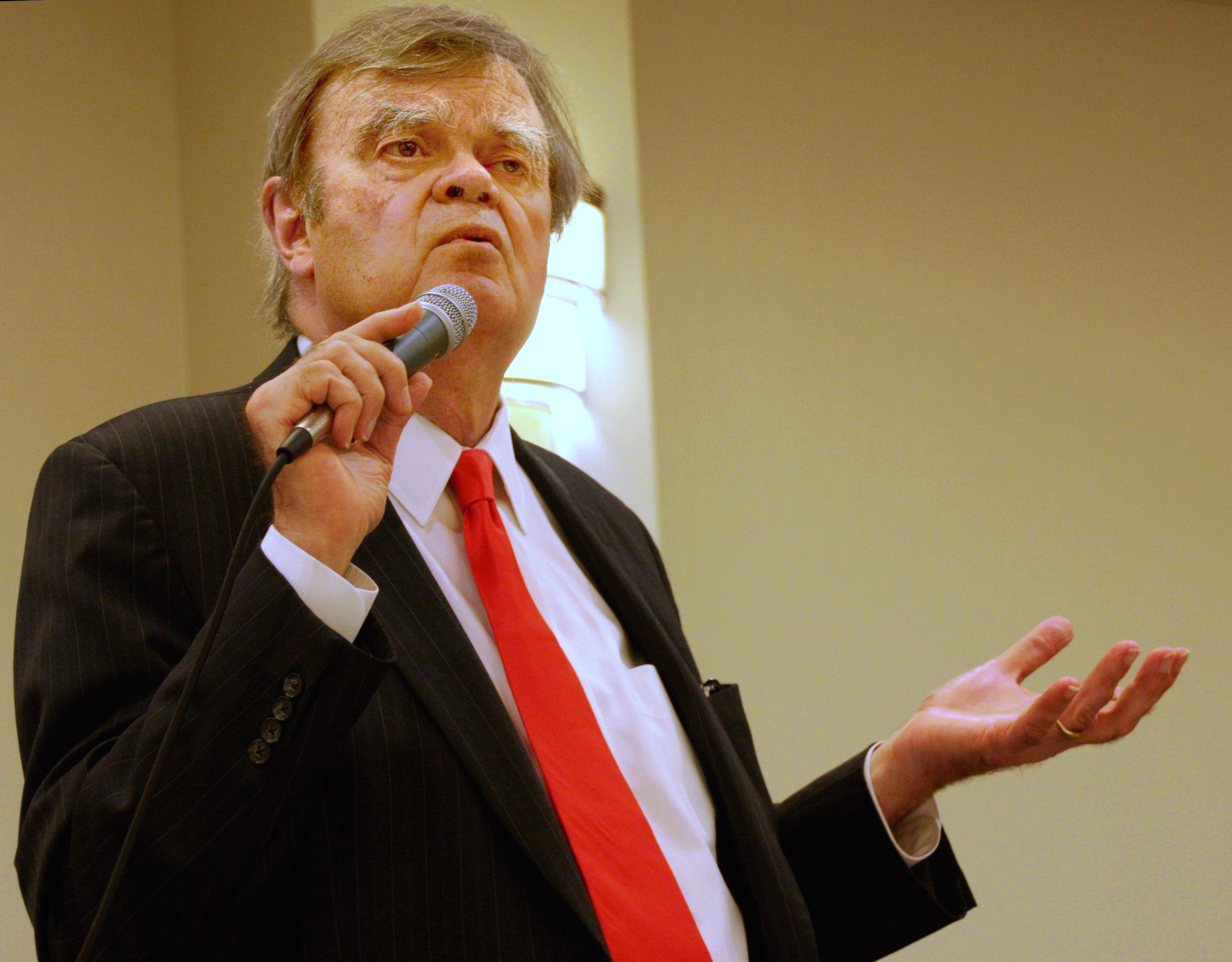
Keillor in 2016

Keillor has been called "[o]ne of the most perceptive and witty commentators about Midwestern life" by Randall Balmer in Encyclopedia of Evangelicalism. He has written numerous magazine and newspaper articles and more than a dozen books for adults as well as children. In addition to writing for The New Yorker, he has written for The Atlantic Monthly and National Geographic. He has also written for Salon.com and authored an advice column there under the name "Mr. Blue." Following a heart operation, he resigned on September 4, 2001, his last column being titled "Every dog has his day":

In 2004, Keillor published a collection of political essays, Homegrown Democrat: A Few Plain Thoughts from the Heart of America, and in June 2005 he began a column called The Old Scout, which ran at Salon.com and in syndicated newspapers. The column went on hiatus in April 2010 so that he could "finish a screenplay and start writing a novel."

=== Bookselling ===
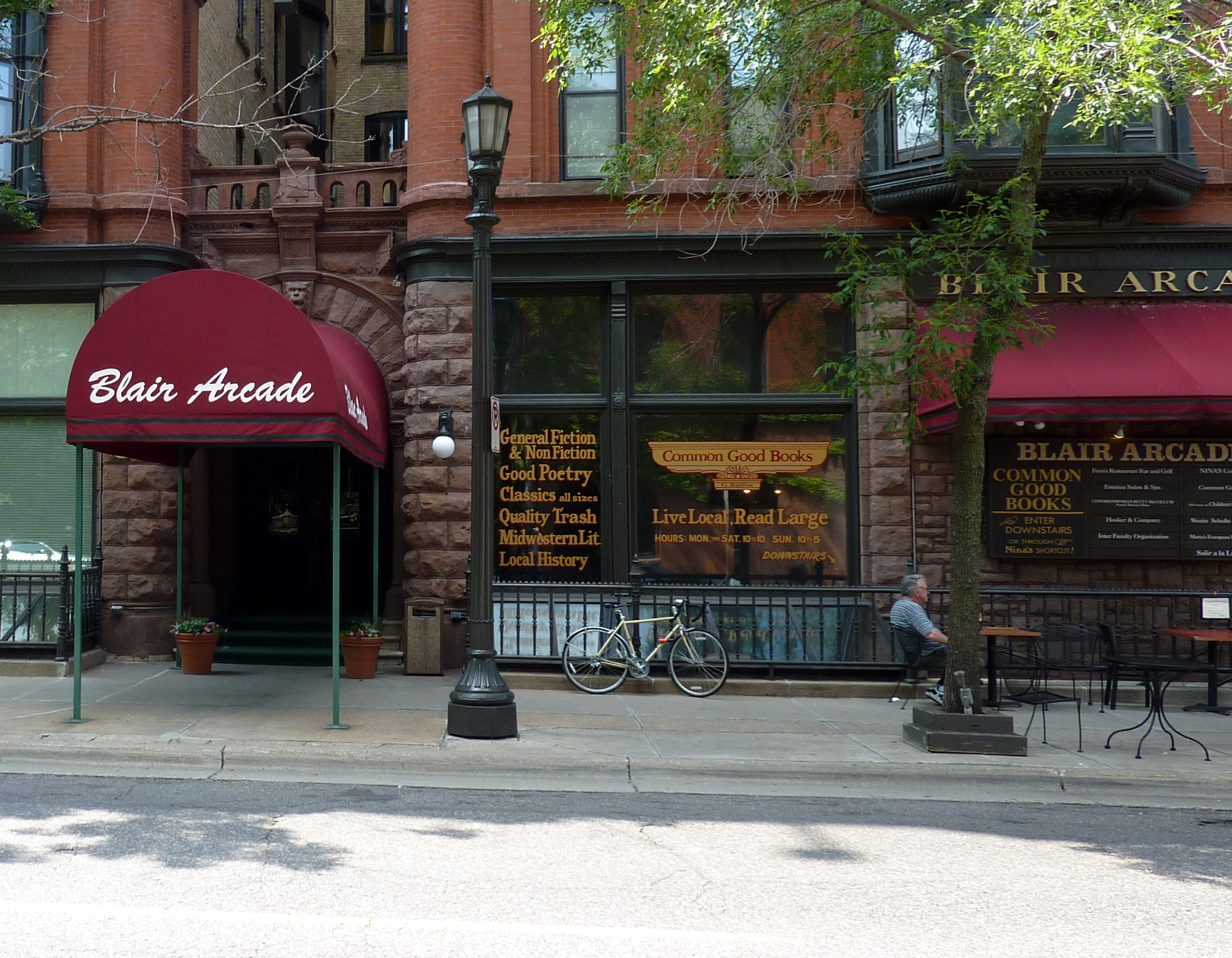
"Common Good Books, G. Keillor, Prop." in St. Paul

On November 1, 2006, Keillor opened an independent bookstore, "Common Good Books, G. Keillor, Prop." in the Blair Arcade Building at the southwest corner of Selby and N. Western Avenues in the Cathedral Hill area in the Summit-University neighborhood of Saint Paul, Minnesota.

In April 2012, the store moved to a new location on Snelling Avenue across from Macalester College in the Macalester-Groveland neighborhood. In April 2019, Keillor sold his interest in the bookstore. The store was renamed Next Chapter and is in the same location.

=== Voice-over work ===
Probably owing in part to his distinctive North-Central accent, Keillor is often used as a voice-over actor. Some notable appearances include:

- Voiceover artist for Honda UK's "the Power of Dreams" campaign. The campaign's most memorable advertisement is the 2003 Honda Accord commercial Cog, which features a Heath Robinson contraption (or Rube Goldberg machine) made entirely of car parts. The commercial ends with Keillor asking, "Isn't it nice when things just work?" Since then, Keillor has voiced the tagline for most if not all UK Honda advertisements, and even sang the voiceover in the 2004 Honda Diesel commercial Grrr.
- Voice of the Norse god Odin in an episode of the Disney animated series Hercules
- Voice of Walt Whitman and other historical figures in Ken Burns's documentary series The Civil War and Baseball
- Narrator of "River of Dreams" Documentary at the National Mississippi River Museum and Aquarium in Dubuque, Iowa
- In 1991, Keillor released Songs of the Cat, an album of original and parody songs about cats.

=== Film ===
In 2006, Keillor wrote and portrayed himself in the musical comedy film A Prairie Home Companion, directed by Robert Altman. It is a fictional representation of behind-the-scenes activities at the long-running public radio show of the same name. The film received mostly positive reviews and was a moderate box-office success on a small budget. It features an ensemble cast including Woody Harrelson, Tommy Lee Jones, Kevin Kline, Lindsay Lohan, Virginia Madsen, John C. Reilly, Maya Rudolph, Meryl Streep, and Lily Tomlin.

== Reception ==
In a 2006 essay in Slate, Sam Anderson called Keillor "very clearly a genius. His range and stamina alone are incredible—after 30 years, he rarely repeats himself—and he has the genuine wisdom of a Cosby or Mark Twain." But Keillor's "willful simplicity," Anderson wrote, "is annoying because, after a while, it starts to feel prescriptive. Being a responsible adult doesn't necessarily mean speaking slowly about tomatoes." Anderson also noted that in 1985, when Time magazine called Keillor the funniest man in America, Bill Cosby said, "That's true if you're a pilgrim."

=== In popular culture ===
Keillor's style, particularly his speaking voice, has often been parodied.

- In The Simpsons episode "Marge on the Lam", the family watches a Keillor-like monologist on television and does not find him funny.
- On the November 19, 2011, episode of Saturday Night Live, cast member Bill Hader impersonated Keillor in a sketch depicting celebrities auditioning to replace Regis Philbin as co-host of Live! with Kelly.
- One Boston radio critic likens Keillor and his "down-comforter voice" to "a hypnotist intoning, 'You are getting sleepy now'," while noting that Keillor does play to listeners' intelligence.
- Pennsylvanian singer-songwriter Tom Flannery wrote a song in 2003 titled "I Want a Job Like Garrison Keillor's."
- Two parody books by "Harrison Geillor", The Zombies of Lake Woebegotten and The Twilight of Lake Woebegotten, were published by Night Shade Books in 2010 and 2011.

== Personal life ==
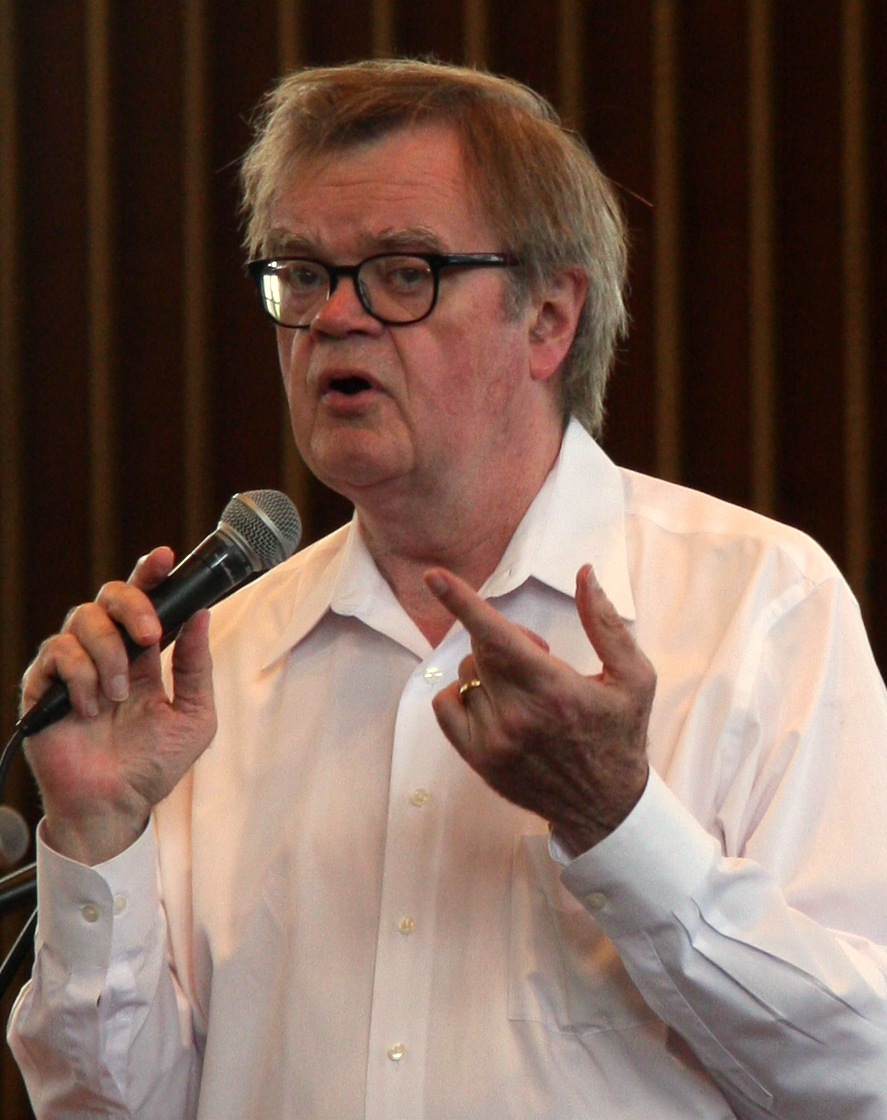
Keillor in 2014

Keillor is a member of the Democratic-Farmer-Labor Party. He is 6 ft 3 in (191 cm) tall. He considers himself a loner and prefers not to make eye contact with people. Though not formally diagnosed, he also considers himself to be on the high-functioning end of the autism spectrum. He spoke about his experiences as an autistic person in his keynote address at the 19th Annual Minnesota Autism Conference in 2014.

Keillor has been married three times. He was married to Mary Guntzel from 1965 to 1976; they had one son. From 1985 to 1990 he was married to Ulla Skaerved, a former exchange student from Denmark at Keillor's high school whom he re-encountered at a class reunion. In 1995, Keillor married classical string player Jenny Lind Nilsson (born 1957), who is also from Keillor's home town of Anoka, Minnesota. They have one daughter.

Between his first and second marriages, Keillor was romantically involved with Margaret Moos, who worked as a producer of A Prairie Home Companion.

On September 7, 2009, Keillor was briefly hospitalized after suffering a minor stroke. He returned to work a few days later.

In 2006, after a visit to a United Methodist church in Highland Park, Texas, Keillor created a local controversy with his remarks about the event, including the rhetorical suggestion of a connection between event participants and supporters of torture and a statement creating an impression of political intimidation: "I walked in, was met by two burly security men ... and within 10 minutes was told by three people that this was the Bushes' church and that it would be better if I didn't talk about politics." In response, the lecture series coordinator said the two "burly security men" were a local policeman and the church's own security supervisor, both present because the agreement with Keillor's publisher specified that the venue provide security. In addition, the coordinator said that Keillor arrived at the church, declined an introduction, and took the stage without an opportunity to mingle with the audience, so he did not know when these warnings might have been dispensed. The publicist concurred, saying that Keillor did not have contact with any church members or people in the audience before he spoke.

Supposedly, before Keillor's remarks, participants at the event had considered the visit cordial and warm. Asked to respond, Keillor stuck to his story, describing the people who advised him not to discuss politics and saying he had no security guards at other stops on the tour.

In 2007, Keillor wrote a column that in part criticized "stereotypical" gay parents, who he said were "sardonic fellows with fussy hair who live in over-decorated apartments with a striped sofa and a small weird dog and who worship campy performers." In response to the strong reactions of many readers, Keillor said:

I live in a small world – the world of entertainment, musicians, writers – in which gayness is as common as having brown eyes ... And in that small world, we talk openly and we kid each other a lot. But in the larger world, gayness is controversial ... and so gay people feel besieged to some degree and rightly so ... My column spoke as we would speak in my small world, and it was read by people in the larger world and thus the misunderstanding. And for that, I am sorry. Gay people who set out to be parents can be just as good parents as anybody else, and they know that, and so do I.

In 2008, Keillor created a controversy in St. Paul when he filed a lawsuit against his neighbor's plan to build an addition on her home, citing his need for "light and air" and a view of "open space and beyond". Keillor's home is significantly larger than others in his neighborhood and it would still be significantly larger than his neighbor's with its planned addition. Keillor came to an undisclosed settlement with his neighbor shortly after the story became public.

In 2009, one of Keillor's "Old Scout" columns contained a reference to "lousy holiday songs by Jewish guys" and a complaint about "Silent Night" as rewritten by Unitarians, upsetting some readers. A Unitarian minister named Cynthia Landrum responded, "Listening to him talk about us over the years, it's becoming more and more evident that he isn't laughing with us—he's laughing at us", while Jeff Jacoby of The Boston Globe called Keillor "cranky and intolerant".

== Awards and other recognition ==
- A Prairie Home Companion received a Peabody Award in 1980.
- Keillor received a Medal for Spoken Language from the American Academy of Arts and Letters in 1990.
- In 1994, Keillor was inducted into the National Radio Hall of Fame.
- He received a National Humanities Medal from the National Endowment for the Humanities in 1999.
- In 2007, The Moth, a NYC-based not-for-profit storytelling organization, awarded Garrison Keillor the first Moth Award – Honoring the Art of the Raconteur at the annual Moth Ball.
- In September 2007, Keillor was awarded the 2007 John Steinbeck Award, given to artists who capture "the spirit of Steinbeck's empathy, commitment to democratic values, and belief in the dignity of the common man."
- Keillor received a Grammy Award in 1988 for his recording of Lake Wobegon Days.
- In 2016, he received the Fitzgerald Award for Achievement in American Literature.
- He has also received two CableACE Awards and a George Foster Peabody Award.

== Bibliography ==
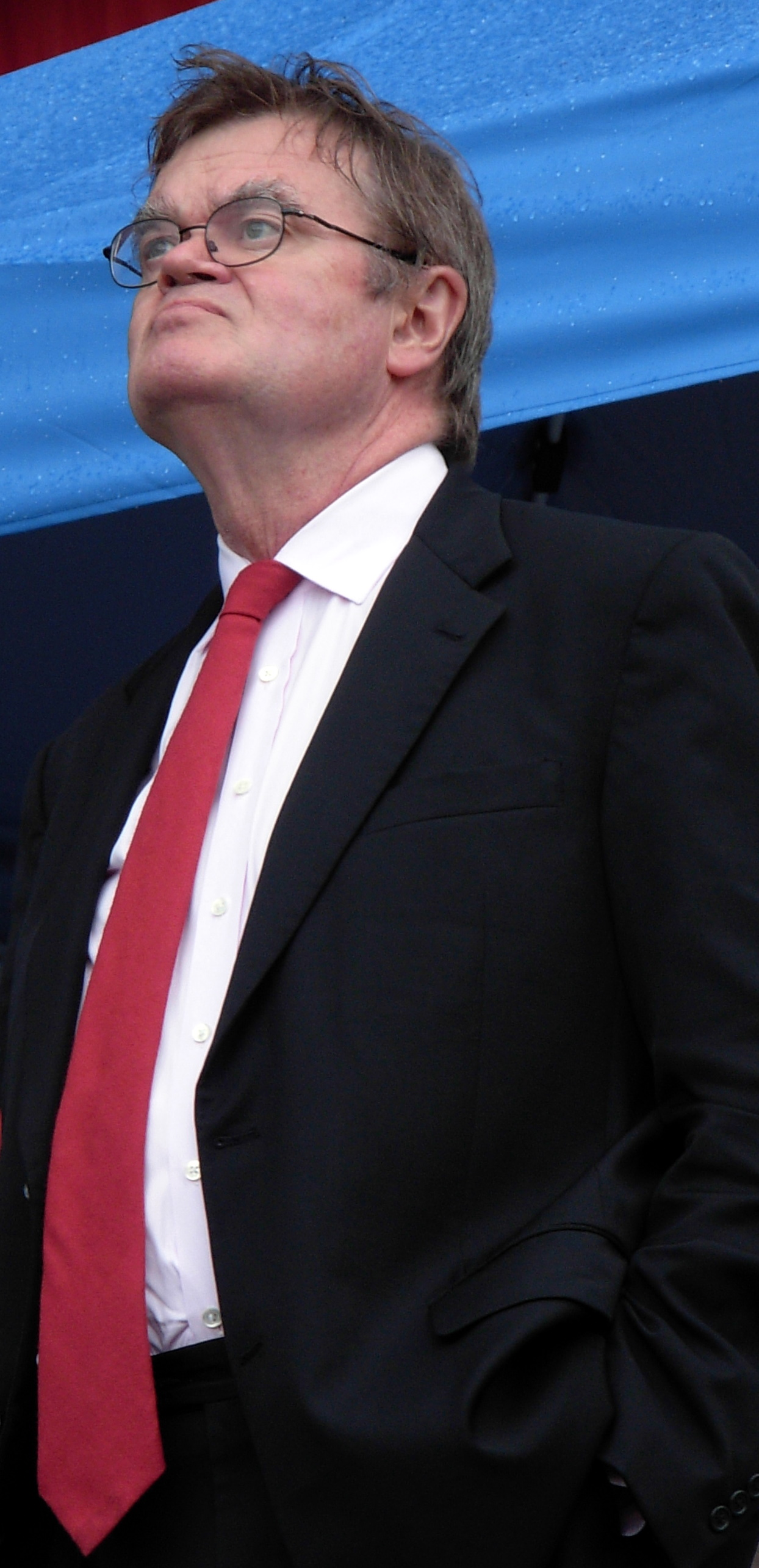
Keillor during a live broadcast in 2007 in Lanesboro, Minnesota

=== Books ===
- G.K. The D.J. (1977)
- Happy to Be Here (1981), ISBN 0-06-811201-7
- WLT: A Radio Romance (1991), ISBN 0-670-81857-7
- The Book of Guys (1993), ISBN 0-670-84943-X
- The Sandy Bottom Orchestra (with Jenny Lind Nilsson, 1996), ISBN 0-7868-1250-8
- Me, by Jimmy "Big Boy" Valente (1999), ISBN 0-670-88796-X
- Love Me (2003), ISBN 0-670-03246-8
- Homegrown Democrat: A Few Plain Thoughts from the Heart of America (2004), ISBN 0-670-03365-0
- Daddy's Girl (2005), ISBN 978-1-4231-0514-5
- A Christmas Blizzard (2009), ISBN 978-0-670-02136-9
- Cat, You Better Come Home (2010), 978–0670012770
- Guy Noir and the Straight Skinny (2012), ISBN 0-143-12081-6
- The Keillor Reader (2014), ISBN 978-0670020584
- That Time of Year: A Minnesota Life (2020) ISBN 978-1-95162-768-3
- Cheerfulness (2023) ISBN 979-8-9882818-0-1

Lake Wobegon series

- Lake Wobegon Days (1985), ISBN 0-14-013161-2; a recorded version of this won a Grammy Award for Best Spoken Word or Non-musical Album in 1988
- Leaving Home: A Collection of Lake Wobegon Stories (1987; collection of Lake Wobegon stories), ISBN 0-670-81976-X
- We Are Still Married (1989; collection including some Lake Wobegon stories), ISBN 9780670826476
  - An expanded edition was released in 1990 that added six stories and removed one from the original publication. ISBN 978-0-140-13156-7
- Wobegon Boy (1997), ISBN 0-670-87807-3
- Lake Wobegon Summer 1956 (2001), ISBN 0-571-21014-7
- In Search of Lake Wobegon (Photographs by Richard Olsenius, 2001), ISBN 978-0-670-03037-8
- Pontoon: A Novel of Lake Wobegon (2007), ISBN 0-670-06356-8
- Liberty: A Novel of Lake Wobegon (2008), ISBN 0-670-01991-7
- Life among the Lutherans (2009), ISBN 978-0-8066-7061-4
- Pilgrims: A Wobegon Romance (2009), ISBN 978-0-670-02109-3
- The Lake Wobegon Virus (2020), ISBN 9781951627676
- Boom Town: a Lake Wobegon novel (2022), ISBN 978-1-7330745-5-1

=== Short fiction ===
Short stories from The New Yorker

Title	Volume/Part	Date	Page(s)	Subject(s)
A Christmas Story		December 25, 1989	40–42	A boy, Jim, neglected by his plutocrat parents, runs away on Christmas Eve with his ill dog.
Studio B		July 29, 1991	27–32	Strange things happen at radio station WLT's Studio B
Al Denny		March 11, 1991	30–32	Fictional mini-autobiography of author of self-help books
Zeus the Lutheran		October 29, 1990	32–37	The goddess Hera's lawyer meets Zeus in a café to try to ...
How the Savings and Loans Were Saved		October 16, 1989	42	Huns take over Chicago S & L offices...
Meeting Famous People		April 18, 1988	34–36	The trial of a famous singer who assaulted a fan
Your Book Saved My Life		December 28, 1987	40–41	A misunderstood author's books have been difficult for his readers...
End of an Era		October 28, 1985	31–32	Fiction about his friends' reactions to the death of an aging hippie.
What Did We Do Wrong?		September 16, 1985	32–35	Fiction about Annie Szemanski, the first woman to play major league baseball.
The People V. Jim		July 8, 1985	21	An author of so-called list articles is questioned by a lawyer
Who We Were and What We Meant by It		April 16, 1984	44–45	Fiction about the so-called Momentist movement

=== Poetry ===
Collections

- The Selected Verse of Margaret Haskins Durber (1979)
- 77 Love Sonnets (2009), ISBN 0-14-311527-8
- O, What a Luxury: Verses Lyrical, Vulgar, Pathetic & Profound (2013)
- Living with Limericks (2019), ISBN 978-1-7330745-1-3

Anthologies

- Good Poems (2002), ISBN 0-670-03126-7
- Good Poems for Hard Times (2005), ISBN 0-670-03436-3
- Good Poems, American Places (2011), ISBN 0-670-02254-3

=== Articles and other contributions ===
- "Notes and Comment". The Talk of the Town. The New Yorker. 60 (47): 17–18. January 7, 1985. (Note: A friend's visit to San Francisco and Stinson Beach, California.)
- "Hollywood in the Fifties". The Talk of the Town. The New Yorker: 40–41. November 16, 1987.
- "Three New Twins Join Club in Spring". The New Yorker: 32–33. February 22, 1988.
