= Richard Olsenius =

American photographer

Richard Olsenius is an American photographer, videographer, and music composer whose 50-year career has taken him around the United States, throughout South America, and across the Arctic. His work has appeared in newspapers, magazines, books, art galleries, museum collections, films and stage presentations.

== Early life and education ==
Olsenius was born in Galesburg, Illinois, in 1946, and grew up on the edge of the prairie, a landscape he was drawn to throughout his photographic career. "To me there is nothing more powerful than… seeing the prairie begin to rise up. Because there is nothing to hang onto out there, your soul taps into the ground a little stronger. You become more self-reliant. And you identify so strongly with your landscape…"

He moved to St. Paul, Minnesota, at a young age where he attended both grade school and high school. He attended one year of college at Gustavus Adolphus in St. Peter, Minnesota. At the beginning of his second year, he left for New York and worked as a copy aide at Time Life. In New York Olsenius bought a Konica 35 mm camera and began to photograph street life in Greenwich Village.

== Early photographic career ==
In 1967, Olsenius returned to college attending the University of Minnesota School of Journalism and Mass Communication until 1970. In 1967, he had his first exhibit at the American Swedish Institute in Minneapolis. He had a photographic exhibit at Coffman Union, the university student union, in 1968. He worked as photo editor of the university's Ivory Tower Magazine. In 1969, he worked as a summer intern at the Minneapolis Star evening paper, and by 1970 he was hired full-time by the larger circulation Minneapolis Tribune morning and Sunday paper. 1970 was also the year Olsenius won two scholarship awards and had his first single-artist exhibit at the Minneapolis Institute of Art. The awards were the William Randolph Hearst Photojournalism Scholarship award and the Kappa Alpha Mu Photojournalism Scholarship award. His photographic exhibit at the Minneapolis Institute of Arts, titled "High School", focused on the changing status of inner-city schools due to white flight to the suburbs. It consisted of 40 black and white prints, reflecting Olsenius's lifelong interest in the black and white image.

In his National Geographic Field Guide to Digital Black and White Photography, Olsenius stated, "Black-and-white photography is a special way of seeing and recording the world around us. In a world of profuse and ubiquitous color, black-and-white provides clarity to form, poignancy to character, and timelessness to action. There is a special 'otherness' to the black-and-white image."

A number of images from the show were purchased for the Art Institute's permanent collection. In 1972 selected images from "High School" were also published in the hardcover art and literary publication, Audience magazine.

Don Morrison of the Minneapolis Star reviewed the "High School" exhibit: "It is not a bleak show, exactly, but it whacked me hard. Maybe it's my elder sensibilities or possibly just a mood. In any event, it lumped my throat and misted my eyes... What's disturbing about these pictures is the thought that this isn't the way youth should be."

As a staff photographer at the Minneapolis Tribune, Olsenius covered news and feature stories at the local, state, regional, national, and international level. Stories ranged from local high school football, to energy development in the West, to the genocide of Cambodians by dictator Pol Pot. Over his years with the Tribune, Olsenius won numerous awards from the Associated Press, Minnesota Press Photographers, NPPA, Inland Daily Press Association, and Pictures of the Year by the University of Missouri School of Journalism. In 1980, Olsenius was awarded the World Press Photo Award for his coverage of Cambodian refugees. The award was presented in the Netherlands and accepted on behalf of Olsenius by Ambassador Geri Joseph.

In 1977, Olsenius' first photo book, Flight, was published by Red Studio Press. "Richard Olsenius takes his readers on a journey through life," stated the reviewer at the Minneapolis Star. "Anyone familiar with Olsenius's work in the Minneapolis Tribune expects quality from his photographs, a unique imaginative perspective that tells you immediately, 'that's an Olsenius' before you read the picture credit. That quality is maintained in Flight."

In 1980, while still at the Tribune, Olsenius produced his first film, Autumn Passage, which traces the subtle changes from fall to winter in the Midwest. It was awarded a bronze medal at the New York International Film Festival, and in 1981, received a certificate of merit at the Chicago International Film Festival.

In 1982, Olsenius left the Minneapolis Tribune to freelance and produce two books: The Minnesota Travel Companion and the Wisconsin Travel Companion. These recounted the history along the major highways of each state. A reviewer for the Minnesota Travel Companion found the book "Clearly organized, thoughtfully laid out and easy to use. His book is richly laced with illustrations: 160 photographs from the archives of the Minnesota Historical Society…It is altogether a first-rate job — a book that is as interesting to read at home as it is on the road."

== Work with National Geographic ==
In 1985, Olsenius began working with National Geographic on magazine stories, books and National Geographic Traveler Magazine. His assignments took him throughout North and South America and Europe. On one of his most notable trips, he covered a story about the 60-foot motorsailer Belvedere, the first American yacht to traverse the fabled Northwest Passage west to east. The passage is a treacherous waterway through the Arctic archipelago that links the Pacific and Atlantic Oceans, and has a long history of stranded ships, lost crew, and failed dreams.

Olsenius produced eight feature stories for National Geographic, with additional publication in the German Geo, and 16 National Geographic books, book chapters, and Traveler articles. Three of those books were also written by Olsenius: Dog Stories (2003), the National Geographic Field Guide for Digital Black and White Photography (2005), and the National Geographic Field Guide for Digital Video (2007).

From 1995 to 1999, Olsenius was hired as a full-time photo editor for National Geographic, and as co-producer for developing the magazine's first website.

== Garrison Keillor collaboration ==
In 2000, Olsenius resumed his freelance photography, collaborating with American author and radio personality, Garrison Keillor, on a National Geographic story, "In Search of Lake Wobegon." This was the first effort to put a face on Garrison Keillor's mythical town of Lake Wobegon.

"Before their collaboration, the 'lake' had existed only in Keillor's mind and writings. But, as Olsenius's work shows, aspects of the imagery world could be found in actual life, in central Minnesota. To emphasize the link between the imaginary and the real, Olsenius used a large-format camera and black-and-white film. His approach thus united him across time with Jackson, Curtis and other pioneers of photography in the Americas," according to author and photographer Sam Abell in Through the Lens: National Geographic's Greatest Photographs.

In 2001, their collaborative story was published in a book by the same name, published by Viking Studio Press. Olsenius's photography from the book was exhibited at the Edward Carter Gallery in New York (October 2001), the James J. Hill House, Minnesota Historical Society in St. Paul, Minnesota (December 2001), the Betty Strong Center Encounter Center in Sioux City, Iowa (September 2008), and the Stearns County Museum in St. Cloud, Minnesota (April 21 to September 30, 2002).

Keith Taylor of the Chicago Tribune reviewed In Search of Lake Wobegon. "For even a casual reader or radio listener, though, the real pleasure of this book is in the photos. Now we can finally see what Lake Wobegon and its inhabitants look like. In its landscapes, its dirt roads, its farms, at the school proms, in church or at the local diner, it looks surprisingly like we thought it would. In one of Olsenius' photos with the caption "Children observing artificial insemination"... it is much like the rest of Garrison Keillor's prose: humorous, nostalgic, real, occasionally heartbreaking and touched with the sublime."

Malcolm Jones, reviewing In Search of Lake Wobegon for The New York Times, wrote, "the austerely affectionate black-and-white photographs of Richard Olsenius. With accompanying text by Keillor, this elegant photo album showcases the real Minnesota towns, farmland and prairies that helped inspire Keillor's imaginary town."

"As an artful evocation of Keillor's beloved invention, Richard Olsenius's composed black-and-white photographs of rural Minnesota. He would compose images of the landscape as well as exploring values and eccentricities of the communities based there."

== Additional creative collaborations ==
In addition to his work with National Geographic, Olsenius's photography was published in other books, including Day in the Life of America (1986), the 1987 Midwest Art Calendar, and numerous magazines. He was particularly interested in blending music, stills and video, publishing the book, music, CD-ROM multi-media packages Distant Shores and Arctic Odyssey and the video America's Inland Coast, which was broadcast on PBS stations across the United States.

Referring to the multi-media Distant Shores, Kevin Lynch of Wisconsin's Capital Times said, "The atmospheric synthesizers and percussive effects reflect the same care and lean lyricism you find in his photos."

From 2002 to 2004, Olsenius collaborated with media company View One, the US Army, the Korean War Commemorative Committee, and the American Battle Monuments Commission as art director for full-stage screen presentations, historical reenactments, and musical tributes at the MCI Center in Washington, DC. This included productions of Spirit of America, the Salute to Korean War Veterans (50th anniversary) and the Tribute to a Generation, celebrating the opening of the World War II Memorial in Washington, DC.

Between 2002 and 2006, Olsenius teamed up with the well-known Chesapeake Bay photographer Marion Warren to save his iconic black-and-white images. Many of Warren's original negatives were scratched, marked up, and basically unusable. Olsenius digitally reconstructed the images to create prints that rivaled the quality of Marion's original darkroom prints. Later, Olsenius also digitized Warren's color work to ensure its longevity and accessibility to the public. Warren's manager, Joanie Surette, stated in an interview in the Bay Weekly that Olsenius was the only photographer who could print for Warren. After Warren's death in 2006, Olsenius and Surette opened the American Landscape Gallery in Eastport, Maryland, offering prints and books by both photographers. Today the gallery is all online.

As part of the Art in Embassies Program, Olsenius's photography was chosen by the U.S. Department of State for permanent collections in four embassies: Bucharest, Romania; Lusaka, Zambia; Bujumbura, Burundi and Rabat, Morocco.

Because Olsenius has long felt that music is an important component of the photographic moment, he has focused on developing DVDs, where he can combine still imagery, video and music into one story. In 2010, he returned to his book Dog Stories, producing a DVD of the story with video, music, and narration.

In 2012, the United States Postal Service chose an Olsenius photo for their international mail stamp, part of their "Scenic American Landscape Series". The photo was of a morning shoreline in Voyageurs National Park.

In 2015, in collaboration with writer Christine Olsenius, he produced an online long-form video story, "Last Voyage of the Sheila Yeates". Combining writing, music, audio and video interviews, film and stills, the Olseniuses tell the true story of the sinking of the 50-foot top-sail ketch Sheila Yeates off the coast of Greenland in 1989.

Olsenius was contracted in 2016 to video edit and write a music score for the Maryland PBS documentary Beautiful Swimmers Revisited. The film is a 40-year retrospective on the Pulitzer prize-winning book by William Warner about the Chesapeake Bay watermen and the blue crab that shape their lives.

In March 2017, Richard and Christine Olsenius were invited to be the keynote speakers at the Schuneman Symposium at Ohio University's Scripps School of Journalism. Their speech was titled "Balancing Creativity in a Changing Digital Landscape."

Olsenius continues to photograph, film, create music and coordinate his collection of photography. He has completed a photo collection from his work on the Cambodian genocide of the late 1970s, titled Shadows in the Sun: A Cambodian Tragedy.

== Books ==
- Olsenius, R. (2012) Arctic Odyssey Apple iBook, Bluestem Productions
- Olsenius, R. (2011) Distant Shores Apple iBook, Bluestem Productions
- Olsenius, R. (2007) National Geographic Field Guide for Digital Video, National Geographic Society, ISBN 1426201222
- Olsenius, R. (2005) National Geographic Field Guide for Digital Black & White Photography. National Geographic Society. ISBN 0-7922-4196-7
- Olsenius, R. (2003) Dog Stories. National Geographic Society. ISBN 0-7922-3371-9
- Keillor, G. Olsenius, R. (2001) In Search of Lake Wobegon. Penguin Putnam Group ISBN 0-670-03037-6
- Olsenius, R. (1998) Arctic Odyssey. Bluestem Productions. ISBN 0-9609064-9-5
- Olsenius, R. Olsenius, C. (1990) Distant Shores. Bluestem Productions. ISBN 0-9609064-5-2
- Olsenius, R. Olsenius, C. (1990) Distant Shores; Book and CD, Bluestem Productions. ISBN 0-9609064-4-4
- Olsenius, R. (1987) Midwest Art Calendar. Bluestem Productions. ISBN
- Olsenius, R. Zerby, J (1983) Wisconsin Travel Companion. Bluestem Productions and Mijaz, Inc. ISBN 0-8166-3678-8
- Olsenius, R. Zerby, J (2001) Wisconsin Travel Companion. University of Minnesota Press. ISBN 0-8166-3678-8
- Olsenius, R. (1982) Minnesota Travel Companion. Bluestem Productions. ISBN 0-9609064-0-1
- Olsenius, R. (2001) Minnesota Travel Companion. University of Minnesota Press. ISBN 0-9609064-0-1
- Olsenius, R. (1977) Flight. Red Studio Press, ISBN 0-916320-03-0

== National Geographic magazine articles ==
- Olsenius, R. Phillips, A. (January 2002) "A Love Story, Our Bond with Dogs". National Geographic magazine, pgs. 12–31.
- Olsenius, R Keillor. (December 2000) "In Search of Lake Wobegon". National Geographic magazine. pgs. 86–109.
- Olsenius, R. Ohanian, B. (June 1995) "Living a Dream on the Islands of Puget Sound". National Geographic magazine. pgs.106–130.
- Olsenius, R Poole, R. (October 1993) "Labrador, Canada's Place Apart" (also Cover) National Geographic magazine. pgs. 2–35.
- Olsenius, R. Abercrombie, T. (January, 1993) "Wide Open Wyoming". National Geographic magazine. pgs. 54–79.
- Olsenius, R. (November 1991) "Alaska Highway, Wilderness Escape Route". National Geographic magazine. pgs. 68–99. (Written and photographed by Olsenius)
- Olsenius, R. Bockstoce, J. (August 1990) "Changing Images of the Northwest Passage". National Geographic magazine. pgs. 2–33.
- Olsenius, R. Cobb, Jr. C. Sacha, B. (July 1987) "The Great Lakes Troubled Waters", National Geographic magazine. pgs.2–31.

=== Other book and magazine articles ===
- Olsenius, R. (September 2010) "The Lost World". National Geographic Traveler. National Geographic Society. pages 80 – 89.
- Abell, S. (2009) Through the Lens National Geographic Greatest Photographs. National Geographic Society. p. 295. p. 262–3. ISBN 9781426205262.
- Olsenius, R. (October 2009) "Citadel in the Clouds". National Geographic Traveler 50 Places of a Lifetime. National Geographic Society. page 108.
- Olsenius, R. (May/June 2009) "Snug Harbors Newfoundland". National Geographic Traveler. National Geographic Magazine. pages 82 – 89.
- Olsenius, R. (June 2009) "Arctic Dispatches". Up here Magazine. page 24.
- Olsenius, R. (2009) "Mileposts/Archives". Up here Magazine 25th Anniversary Special, pages 6–7 and 10–11.
- Smith., T. Olsenius, R. (May 2007) "Beyond Jamestown", Smithsonian Magazine. pages 49–60
- Olsenius, R. (October 2006) Falling For the Ozarks", National Geographic Traveler Tours of a Lifetime. National Geographic Society. pages 42 – 48.
- Olsenius, R. Martin, B. Clark, R. Healey, J, Grossman, D. (2006) National Geographic Ultimate Field Guide to Photography. National Geographic Society.
- Olsenius, R. (October/November 2004) "Big Sea Water". Lake Superior Magazine. pages 22– 26.
- "One Last Road Trip". (June 2003) Washingtonian. pages 58 – 63.
- Olsenius, R. (January/February 2003) "Near Sperryville Virginia", National Geographic Traveler The World in Pictures, National Geographic Society. pages 42–43.
- Olsenius, R. (March/April 2002) "Places in the Heart". American Photo. page 34.
- Keillor, G. Olsenius, R. (September 2002) "A Place Called Wobegon", National Geographic Best of America Collector's Edition vol. 2. pages 104 - 107.
- Olsenius, R. (March/April 2002) "This Side of Main Street". Preservation Magazine. pages 37–41.
- "Exposures", Photo District News, March 2002. page 126.
- Olsenius, R. (1995) "Parklands Near at Hand." Exploring Canada's Spectacular National Parks. National Geographic Society. pages 110–137. ISBN 0-7922-2735-2.
- Olsenius, R. (February 1994) "Big South Fork, A Hidden Wilderness". National Geographic Traveler. National Geographic Society. pages 66–75.
- Olsenius, R. (1994) "Voyageurs National Park". National Geographic Traveler National Parks. National Geographic Society. pages 51–61.
- Olsenius, R. (September/October 1993) "Mountain Refuge on the Prairie". National Geographic Traveler. National Geographic Society. pg.98–105.
- Olsenius, R. (July/August 1992) "Voyageur National Park". National Geographic Traveler. National Geographic Society. pages 94–105.
- Olsenius, R. (1989) "By Horse and By Foot". Great American Journeys. National Geographic Society. pages 10 – 53. ISBN 0-87044-669-X
- Lloyd, B. "Yachting Eastward Into Arctic History." The New York Times. July 24, 1989. Section C, Page 9.
- Olsenius, R. (1986) A Day in the Life of America. Collins Publishers. p. 2-3 ISBN 0-00-217734-X
- Olsenius, R. (1984) The Making of a Collection: Photographs from the Minneapolis Institute of Arts. Aperture, p. 102.
- Watson, C. (December 19, 1982) "Olsenius guide traces history along highways." Minneapolis Tribune. p. 3E.
- Morrison, D. (March 4, 1971 "Photos of youth mist the eyes of an elder." Minneapolis Star. Page 8B.
- Taylor, K. (November 4, 2001) "Lake Wobegon Again." Chicago Tribune. Page 5, Section 14. (Sunday Books)
- Charnley, B. (November 4, 1978) "A Wordless field of vision." Minneapolis Star. Page 4. (Books)
- A New Exhibit, April 21 - September 30. (April 15) "In Search of Lake Wobegon." St. Cloud Times. Page 12.

Erlich, G, Olsenius, R. (March, 1994) "An American Place." Life: The Power of Prayer. Pages 88–89.

== Films and art direction ==
- The Way West, DVD and web, Bluestem Productions, 2018
- Last Voyage of the Sheila Yeates - by Christine & Richard Olsenius - online long-form video story - sheilayeates.com 2016
- Video editing and music score for Beautiful Swimmers Revisited, produced by Tom Horton and Dave Harp, 2016 - Maryland PBS
- Chesapeake Visions, DVD and web, Bluestem Productions, 2013
- Canada's Place Apart DVD and web, Bluestem Productions, 2010
- Dog Stories DVD and web, Bluestem Productions, 2010
- Journey Along the Inside Passage DVD and web, Bluestem Productions, 2010
- Nurse: A World of Care, director, editor, composer, 2008 (supporting video for the book release), Emory University
- Arctic Odyssey, book and CD, Bluestem Productions, 1998
- 1999 Pictures of the Year - Second Place Best Use of Photography/New Media
- Tribute to a Generation. Olsenius, R., art director (video story creation & full stage screen presentations and Arena shows) - MCI Center, Washington D.C. produced by View One, Inc. for the American Battle Monuments Commission. A two and a half hour arena special event featuring historical reenactments and musical tributes to commemorate the opening of the World War II Memorial in Washington, D.C. May, 2004.
- Salute to Korean War Veterans. Olsenius, R., art director (video story creation & full screen presentations - arena shows) - MCI Center, Washington, D.C., produced by View One, Inc. A special event presented by the Department of Defense 50th Anniversary of the Korean War Commemorative Committee, Washington, DC, July 26, 2003.
- Spirit of America, Olsenius, R., art director (video creation & presentations - arena shows) 2002–2004, 2010 MCI Center - Washington, DC, Columbus, OH, Mellon Arena, Pittsburg, PA., Rochester, NY. Contracted by View One and the US Army - MCI Center, Washington, DC.
- America's Inland Coast, 50 minutes, video, Bluestem Productions, 1988. Nationwide program distribution on PBS stations.
- Autumn Passage, 30 minutes, 16mmm, Bluestem Productions, 1980. Library distribution.

=== Music albums ===
- Olsenius, R. (2013) Inside Passage. Bluestem Productions.
- Olsenius, R. (1999) Arctic Odyssey. Bluestem Productions.
- Olsenius, R. (1993) Distant Shores. Bluestem Productions.

== Selected presentations ==
- Keynote lecturer – Ohio University Scripps School of Journalism - Schuneman Symposium. "Balancing Creativity in a Changing Digital Landscape," March, 2017
- Gallery exhibit and Presentation "In Search of Lake Wobegon," Stanley Evans Auditorium, Sioux City, IA September 2008
- Gallery exhibit, "America the Beautiful", Edward Carter Gallery, New York October 2001, imagery from book "In Search of Lake Wobegon"
- Gallery exhibit and Presentation on "In Search of Lake Wobegon" at the James J. Hill House, Minnesota Historical Society, December 2001
- Gallery exhibit (April 21 - September 30, 2002) and presentation on "In Search of Lake Wobegon" (April 21, 2002) at the Stearns History Museum, St. Cloud, Minnesota
- Gallery talk, Minneapolis Institute of Arts, "High School" exhibit, March 1971

== Selected awards ==
- 1999 - Best use of Photography award. Pictures of the Year University of Missouri. Arctic Odyssey Book/CD (2nd place)
- 1988 - America's Inland Coast, Bluestem Productions, 1988. Honorable Mention, National Education Film Festival, 1989
- 1980 - Autumn Passage, Bluestem Productions, 1980. Awarded Bronze Medal, New York International Film Festival, 1980
- 1981- Autumn Passage - Awarded Certificate of Merit, Chicago International Film Festival, 1981
- 1980 - World Press Photo Award - 1st place for coverage of Cambodian Refugees story
- 1979 - University of Missouri, Pictures of the Year, 1st place Cambodia Child Portrait
- 1974 - Minnesota Associated Press Award, Sweepstakes award on Spanish Shepherd
- 1973 - Minnesota Newspaper Association. 3/27/73 awards dinner, 8 top awards
- Inland Newspaper Assoc., 3 top awards
- 1970 - William Randolph Hearst Photojournalism Scholarship winner
- 1970 Kappa Alpha Mu Photojournalism Scholarships awarded to students with academic record and demonstrated promise in the field of photojournalism - University of Minnesota
