= St. Olaf Township, Otter Tail County, Minnesota =

St. Olaf Township, Minnesota
- Township
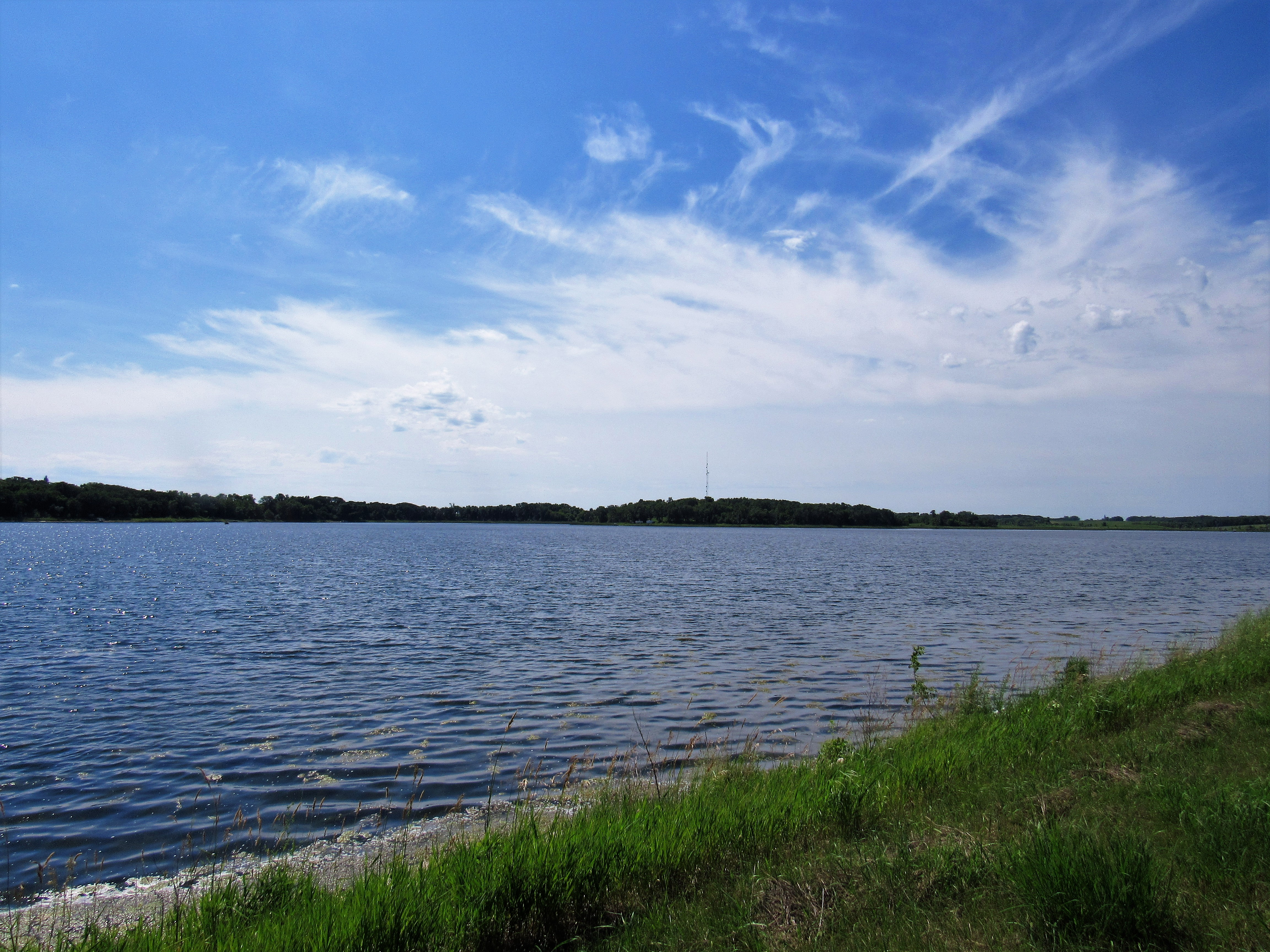
- Johnson Lake

- Location of St. Olaf Township, within Otter Tail County, Minnesota

- Location within the state of Minnesota
- Coordinates: 46°9′14″N 95°49′13″W
- Country: United States
- State: Minnesota
- County: Otter Tail

Area
  - Total: 36.1 sq mi (93.4 km^{2})
  - Land: 32.3 sq mi (83.6 km^{2})
  - Water: 3.7 sq mi (9.7 km^{2})
- Elevation: 1,306 ft (398 m)

Population (2020)
  - Total: 395
  - Density: 12.2/sq mi (4.72/km^{2})
- Time zone: UTC-6 (Central (CST))
  - Summer (DST): UTC-5 (CDT)
- FIPS code: 27-57382
- GNIS feature ID: 0665528

St. Olaf Township is a township in Otter Tail County, Minnesota, United States. The population was 395 at the 2020 census.

St. Olaf Township was originally called Oxford Township, and under the latter name was organized in 1869. The current name, adopted in 1870, was named after Olaf II of Norway.

== 2020 tornado ==
On July 8, 2020, St. Olaf Township was struck by a tornado causing significant damage to the area.

== Geography ==
According to the United States Census Bureau, the township has a total area of 36.1 square miles (93.4 km^{2}), of which 32.3 square miles (83.6 km^{2}) is land and 3.8 square miles (9.7 km^{2}) (10.43%) is water.

== Demographics ==
As of the census of 2000, there were 332 people, 124 households, and 102 families residing in the township. The population density was 10.3 people per square mile (4.0/km^{2}). There were 175 housing units at an average density of 5.4/sq mi (2.1/km^{2}). The racial makeup of the township was 96.69% White, 1.51% Native American, 0.30% Asian, and 1.51% from two or more races.

There were 124 households, out of which 37.9% had children under the age of 18 living with them, 77.4% were married couples living together, 4.0% had a female householder with no husband present, and 17.7% were non-families. 17.7% of all households were made up of individuals, and 7.3% had someone living alone who was 65 years of age or older. The average household size was 2.68 and the average family size was 3.03.

In the township the population was spread out, with 27.1% under the age of 18, 7.2% from 18 to 24, 25.9% from 25 to 44, 29.2% from 45 to 64, and 10.5% who were 65 years of age or older. The median age was 39 years. For every 100 females, there were 104.9 males. For every 100 females age 18 and over, there were 100.0 males.

The median income for a household in the township was $40,865, and the median income for a family was $45,625. Males had a median income of $22,857 versus $27,188 for females. The per capita income for the township was $17,878. About 5.2% of families and 6.8% of the population were below the poverty line, including 9.5% of those under age 18 and 11.1% of those age 65 or over.

== In popular culture ==
St. Olaf is the often-referred to hometown of the character Rose Nylund played by actress Betty White in the television sitcom The Golden Girls that ran on NBC from 1985 to 1992. Although possibly based on the actual St. Olaf, the show depicted a fictionalized version of the town with outlandish or inaccurate features, usually with fictionalized Scandinavian cultural and traditional traits and references to fictional stupidity.
