= WLT: A Radio Romance =

1991 novel by Garrison Keillor

- Author: Garrison Keillor
- Language: English
- Genre: Novel
- Publisher: Viking Press
- Publication date: 1991
- Publication place: United States
- Media type: Print (Hardcover)
- Pages: x, 401
- ISBN: 978-0-670-81857-0
- OCLC: 23767162
- Dewey Decimal: 813/.54
- LC Class: PS3561.E3755 W58 1991

WLT: A Radio Romance is a 1991 novel by Garrison Keillor. The book reached the top ten of The New York Times Best Seller list in 1991.

== Summary ==
The story is about people associated with a fictional Minneapolis radio station called WLT. The events of the book span from the early years of radio broadcasting until the early years of television.

== Reception ==
Writing for The New York Times Book Review, Anne Bernays said, "WLT is a much darker book than one would expect from its first few exuberant and hilarious chapters..."
