= Lake Independence (Jackson County, Minnesota) =

Lake in the state of Minnesota, United States

- Location within Minnesota
- Location: Jackson County, Minnesota
- Coordinates: 43°45′48″N 95°2′51″W
- Type: lake

Lake Independence is a lake in Jackson County, in the U.S. state of Minnesota.

Lake Independence was named from the fact the government surveyors first saw it on Independence Day.

== See also ==
- List of lakes in Minnesota
