= Heartland (United States) =

Central area of the US that is culturally associated with traditional values

The term heartland often invokes imagery of rural areas, such as this wheat field in Kansas.

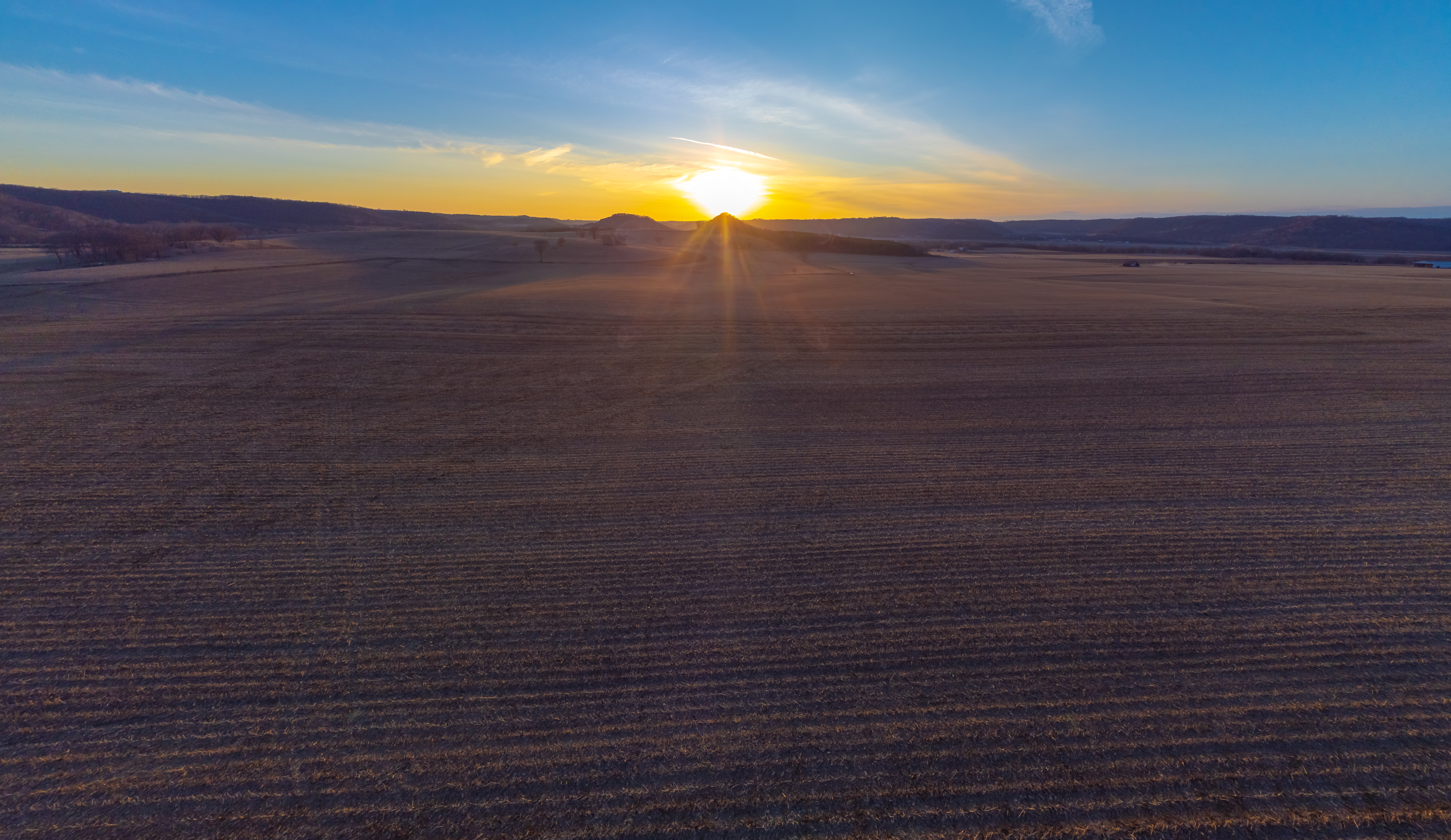
Iowa terrain that is also evocative of the term heartland.

The heartland, when referring to a cultural region of the United States, is the central land area of the country, usually the Midwestern United States and parts of Southern United States or the states that do not border the Atlantic or Pacific oceans, associated with mainstream or traditional values, such as economic self-sufficiency, conservative political and religious ideals, and rootedness in agrarian life.

The US Census Bureau defines the Midwest as consisting of 12 states: Illinois, Indiana, Iowa, Kansas, Michigan, Minnesota, Missouri, Nebraska, North Dakota, Ohio, South Dakota, and Wisconsin. Portions of other non-coastal states can be included in the region as well. These may include eastern portions of the Mountain States (Colorado, Utah, Idaho, Montana, and Wyoming) and northern portions of some Southern states, such as Arkansas, Kentucky, Oklahoma, Tennessee, and West Virginia.

== Location ==
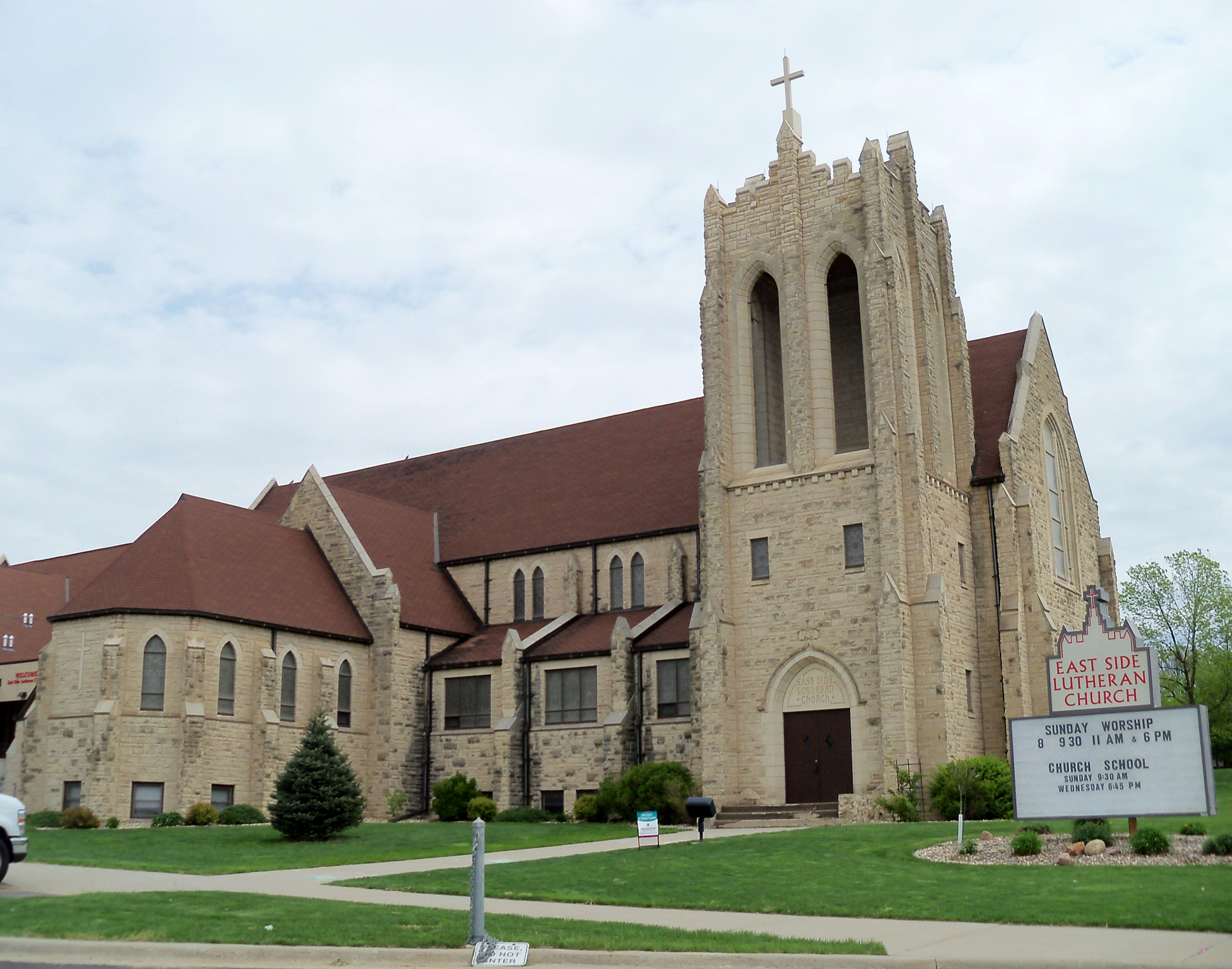
A church in South Dakota

There is no consensus regarding the geographical boundaries of America's heartland. However, the American Midwest is the most commonly cited area as being the nation's heartland, although many other places have been referred to as part of it, often extending to rural or farming regions in the Great Plains. At least as early as 2010, the term Heartland has been used to refer to many so-called "red states", including those in the Bible Belt.

According to the United States Census Bureau, the mean center of population in the US in 2010 was in or around Texas County, Missouri. In 2000, it had been northeast from there, in Phelps County, Missouri. It is projected for the mean center of population to leave the Midwest and enter the Western United States by the mid-21st century.

The geographic center of the 48 contiguous states is near Lebanon, Kansas. When Alaska and Hawaii were admitted to the Union in 1959, the geographic center of the United States moved from Smith County, Kansas, to Butte County, South Dakota. The largest city by population in the American heartland is Chicago, Illinois, with a metro area nearing ten million people, and it ranks third overall, after New York City and Los Angeles, respectively.

== Use of term ==
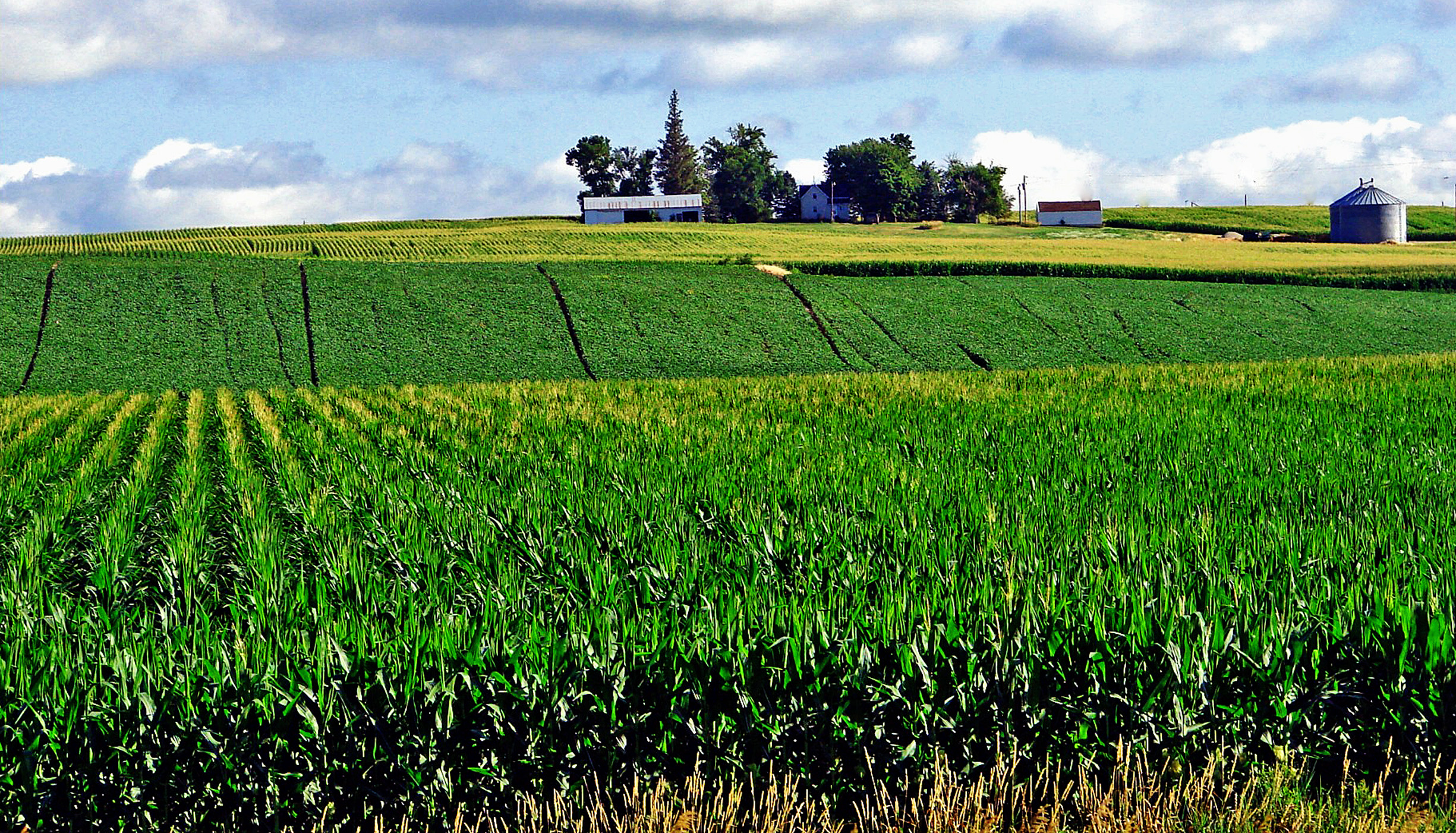
Corn field in Iowa

The British geographer Halford Mackinder coined the word in 1904 to refer to the heart of the Eurasian land mass: a strategic center of industry, natural resources and power. The use of the term "heartland" to apply to the American Midwest did not become common until later in the 20th century.

== Culture ==
Heartland rock musicians such as Bruce Springsteen (New Jersey), Bob Seger (Michigan), Melissa Etheridge (Kansas), John Mellencamp (Indiana), and Tom Petty (Florida) have sung about heartland values. Heartland rock albums include Springsteen's Nebraska. The genre is not necessarily Midwestern, as Springsteen was born in New Jersey, and Petty was born in Florida and has sung about the Southern United States, such as in his album Southern Accents. Modern artists of heartland rock include the Killers and the War on Drugs.

== See also ==
- Bible Belt
- Central United States
- Flyover country
- Middle America (United States)
- Rust Belt
