= Church of the Sacred Heart (Freeport, Minnesota) =

Historic church in Minnesota, United States

- Church of the Sacred Heart (Catholic)
- U.S. National Register of Historic Places
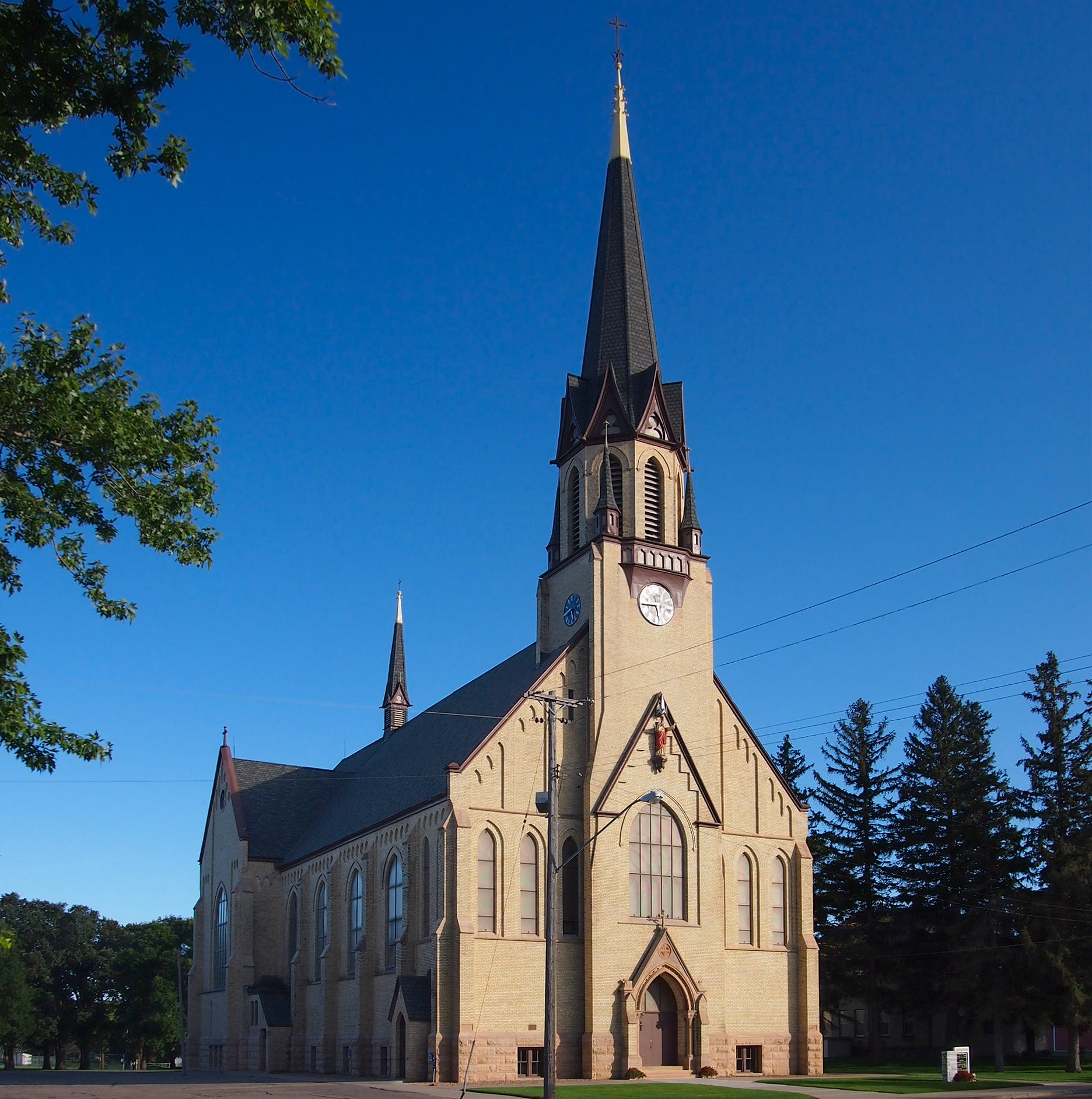
- The Church of the Sacred Heart viewed from the northwest

- Location within Minnesota Location within the United States
- Location: 110 3rd Avenue NE, Freeport, Minnesota
- Coordinates: 45°39′45.5″N 94°41′10″W
- Area: Less than one acre
- Built: 1905–06
- Built by: Paul Koshiol
- Architect: Parkinson & Dockendorff
- Architectural style: Gothic Revival, Romanesque Revival
- NRHP reference No.: 91000906
- Added to NRHP: July 12, 1991

The Church of the Sacred Heart is a historic Roman Catholic church building in Freeport, Minnesota, United States. The church was constructed from 1905 to 1906 as the third and largest building to house a congregation formed by the community's German American settlers in 1881. The property was listed on the National Register of Historic Places in 1991 as Church of the Sacred Heart (Catholic) for its local significance in the theme of social history. It was nominated for demonstrating the central role played by the Catholic church in Freeport and many other Central Minnesota communities settled by German immigrants.

== History ==
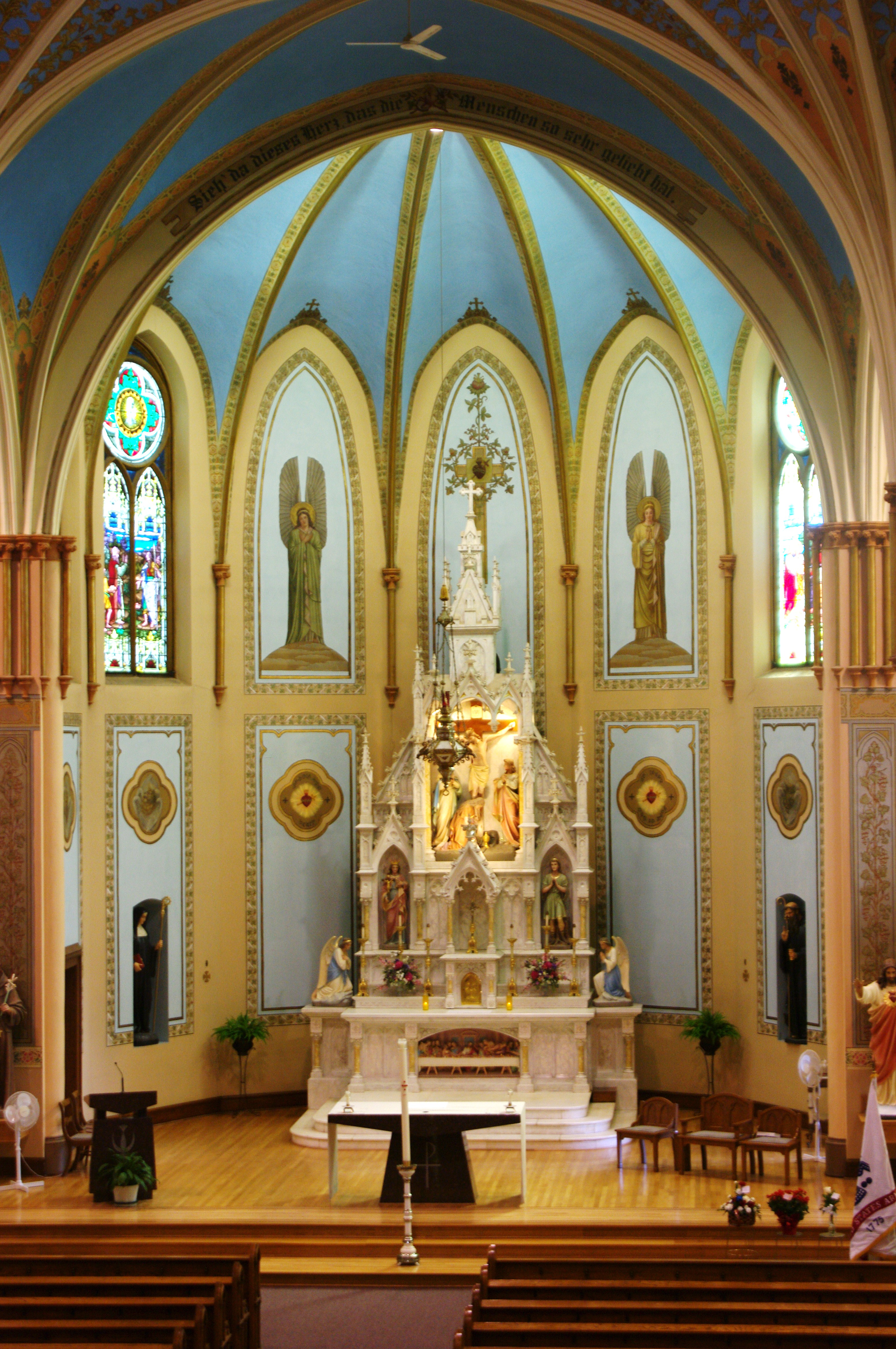
Interior of the Church of the Sacred Heart, 2011

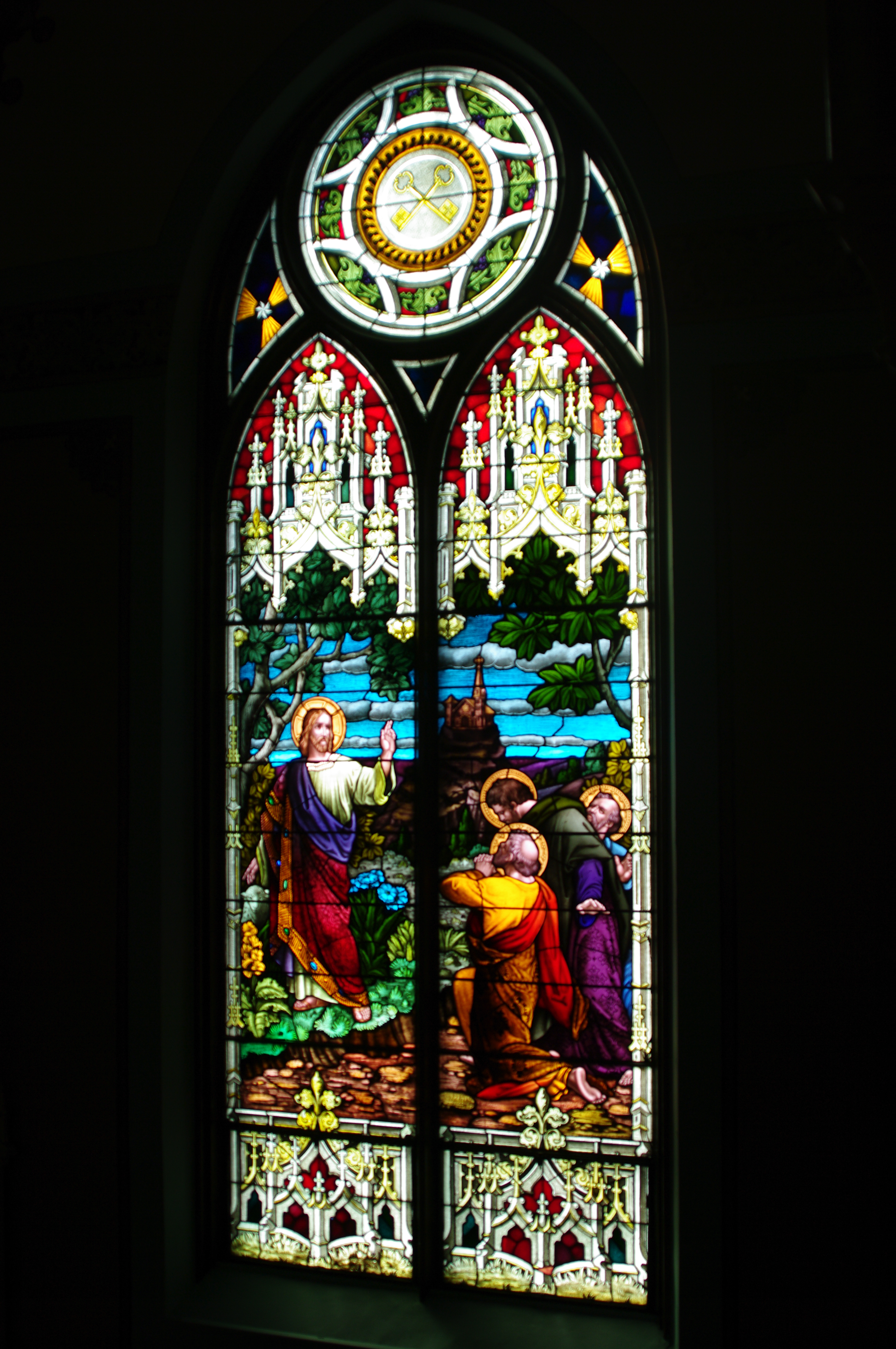
Stained glass windows inside Church of the Sacred Heart, 2011

The Sacred Heart parish was originally part of a parish in New Munich, Minnesota. The heavily German-American community of Freeport asked the Diocese of St. Cloud for a priest to form their own parish, and Father Simplicius Wimmer arrived in response. Freeport's first church building was a wood-frame structure built in 1882, measuring 70 by 36 feet (21 by 11 m), with a rectory added in 1890. The parish outgrew this building and constructed a new one in 1896, which was a brick-veneered building measuring 154 by 66 feet (47 by 20 m) and seating 1,000 people. The second building was completed at a cost of $30,000 (equivalent to $1,161,000 in 2025). The original wood building was donated to the parish of St. Rose and moved five miles (8 km) north.

The 1896 building was struck by lightning in 1904 and destroyed by fire. The parish immediately organized a rebuilding effort, and even the priest pitched in. The third building was even larger and more ornate than the second building, with a total construction cost of $115,000 (equivalent to $4,120,833 in 2025) by the time it was finished in 1906. It required 38 boxcar loads of brick for its construction.

The parish is now part of a cluster with Immaculate Conception in New Munich and St. Rose of Lima in St. Rosa, Minnesota.

== See also ==
- List of Catholic churches in the United States
- National Register of Historic Places listings in Stearns County, Minnesota
