= Oak Township, Stearns County, Minnesota =

Oak Township, Minnesota
- Township
- Location within the state of Minnesota Oak Township, Minnesota (the United States)
- Coordinates: 45°37′N 94°42′W
- Country: United States
- State: Minnesota
- County: Stearns

Area
  - Total: 34.3 sq mi (88.8 km^{2})
  - Land: 32.9 sq mi (85.3 km^{2})
  - Water: 1.4 sq mi (3.5 km^{2})
- Elevation: 1,210 ft (370 m)

Population (2010)
  - Total: 595
  - Density: 18.1/sq mi (6.98/km^{2})
- Time zone: UTC-6 (Central (CST))
  - Summer (DST): UTC-5 (CDT)
- FIPS code: 27-47644
- GNIS feature ID: 0665185

Oak Township is a township in Stearns County, Minnesota, United States. The population was 595 at the 2010 census. The township includes the cities of Freeport and New Munich.

== History ==
Oak Township was originally called Oak Grove Township, and the latter name was organized in 1860. It was renamed Oak in 1867.

== Geography ==
According to the United States Census Bureau, the township has a total area of 34.3 square miles (88.8 km^{2}); 32.9 square miles (85.3 km^{2}) is land and 1.4 square miles (3.5 km^{2}), or 3.93%, is water.

Interstate Highway 94, State Highway 237, and Stearns County Roads 11, 12, and 30 are five of the main routes in the township.

Oak Township is located in Township 125 North of the Arkansas Base Line and Range 32 West of the 5th Principal Meridian.

== Demographics ==
As of the census of 2000, there were 608 people, 178 households, and 152 families residing in the township. The population density was 18.2 people per square mile (7.0/km^{2}). There were 188 housing units at an average density of 5.6/sq mi (2.2/km^{2}). The racial makeup of the township was 99.51% White, 0.16% African American, and 0.33% from two or more races. Hispanic or Latino of any race were 0.16% of the population.

There were 178 households, out of which 53.9% had children under the age of 18 living with them, 80.3% were married couples living together, 3.4% had a female householder with no husband present, and 14.6% were non-families. 11.2% of all households were made up of individuals, and 3.4% had someone living alone who was 65 years of age or older. The average household size was 3.42 and the average family size was 3.78.

In the township the population was spread out, with 37.5% under the age of 18, 7.6% from 18 to 24, 29.9% from 25 to 44, 17.9% from 45 to 64, and 7.1% who were 65 years of age or older. The median age was 30 years. For every 100 females, there were 111.8 males. For every 100 females age 18 and over, there were 119.7 males.

The median income for a household in the township was $45,893, and the median income for a family was $48,333. Males had a median income of $33,000 versus $17,875 for females. The per capita income for the township was $16,360. About 3.4% of families and 3.1% of the population were below the poverty line, including 0.8% of those under age 18 and 3.8% of those age 65 or over.
