= Bud Heidgerken =

American politician

Member of the Minnesota House of Representatives from the 13A district
- In office 2003 - 2009
- Succeeded by: Paul Anderson

Personal details
- Born: September 27, 1943 (age 83) Freeport, Minnesota, U.S.
- Party: Republican
- Spouse: Ann Blommel
- Children: 4
- Education: St. John's Prep; St. Cloud State University
- Occupation: educator, business owner, legislator

Bud Heidgerken (September 27, 1943) is a Minnesota politician and a former member of the Minnesota House of Representatives. A Republican, he represented District 13A, which includes portions of Kandiyohi, Pope and Stearns counties in the west central part of the state.

Heidgerken was first elected in 2002, and was re-elected in 2004 and 2006. He did not seek re-election in 2008, and was succeeded by Rep. Paul Anderson of Starbuck.

Heidgerken graduated from St. John's Prep School in St. Joseph and St. Cloud State University in St. Cloud. He taught school in the Brooten School System and, later, the Belgrade-Brooten-Elrosa School System for 21 years. He and his wife also owned Charlie's Cafe in Freeport for many years. He was a member of the Freeport City Council and the Freeport School Board, and also served as president of the Stearns Electric Trust Board.

Heidgerken made news in the 2008 legislative session by being one of six house Republicans to vote to override Governor Tim Pawlenty's veto of a transportation bill. The bill increased money spent on transportation by raising the gas tax. Due to dissatisfaction in the Republican caucus with this vote, he and the other Republicans who voted to override the veto had their leadership positions taken away. He decided to retire after the session, partially due to the controversy surrounding this vote. Other house members who voted to override faced caucus challenges or decided to retire, as well.
