= Swany White Flour Mills =

Flour manufacturing and wholesaling company

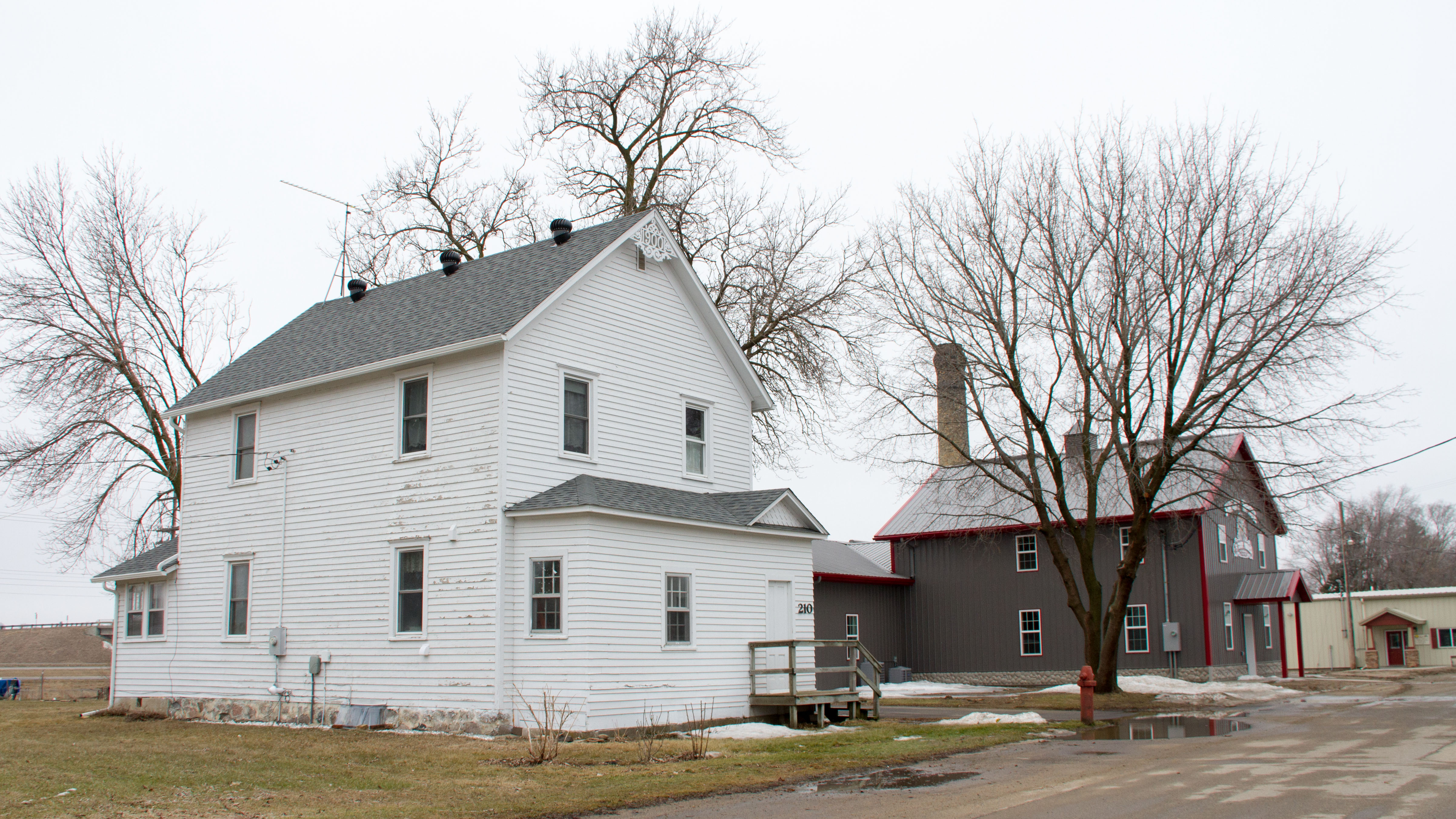
- The 1900 miller's house (left) and 2012 mill (right)
- Interactive map of the Swany White Flour Mills area
- Freeport Roller Mill and Miller's House
- Formerly listed on the U.S. National Register of Historic Places
- Location within Minnesota Location within the United States
- Location: 206–210 2nd Street SE, Freeport, Minnesota
- Coordinates: 45°39′43″N 94°41′18″W
- Area: Less than one acre
- Built: 1898 (mill), 1900 (house)
- Architect: Anthony Hoeschen
- MPS: Stearns County MRA
- NRHP reference No.: 82003043

Significant dates
- Added to NRHP: April 15, 1982
- Removed from NRHP: March 28, 2024

Swany White Flour Mills is a flour manufacturing and wholesaling company based in Freeport, Minnesota, United States. It was established in the late 19th century and has been owned by the same family since 1903. On December 27, 2011, the company's historic 114-year-old mill burned down. Construction on a new facility began the following summer, and Swany White Flour Mills was able to remain in business.

The mill complex had been listed on the National Register of Historic Places in 1982 as the Freeport Roller Mill and Miller's House for its local significance in the theme of commerce. In addition to the 1898 mill, which was expanded to three stories in 1912, the complex consisted of an attached brick powerhouse, the adjacent miller's house built in 1900, and a disused freestanding brick smokestack. It was the last remaining 19th-century mill in use in Minnesota. The miller's house and smokestack still stand, with the 2012 replacement mill between them. The property was delisted from the National Register in 2024.

== History ==
The builder of the original mill, Anton Hoeschen, did not intend to run the mill himself. Instead he saw it as an investment in the community and hoped that he would find a buyer who wanted to be a miller. After several ownership changes in its first few years, the mill was bought in 1903 by Hubert and Peter Thelen, who ran the mill together. They chose the name Swany White for their brand of white flour to suggest that their product was as white as a swan.

In the early years the business was one of a number of small mills throughout Minnesota where local farmers could sell their wheat close to home rather than having to ship it to large mills in Minneapolis. At the mill they could sell their grain outright or trade raw wheat for ground flour for their own family's use.

In 1913 the Thelen brothers remodeled the mill, adding a basement and more manufacturing space. The changes made the mill more efficient, and it was able to produce twice as much flour as it had before. After Peter Thelen's retirement in 1953, his son Walter took over the mill. In 1966 he replaced the mill's original steam engine with an electric motor.

While other small mills were not able to remain profitable during an era of increased consolidation and a downturn in Minnesota wheat production, Walter Thelen came up with a way to keep the mill in business by producing a slightly different product. During the 1970s he persuaded organic farmers to produce organic flour, and he made arrangements with specialty bakers in area. His strategy worked, and Swany White Flour was sold in food cooperatives and health food stores in Minnesota. He also sold flour as far away as the East Coast.

In 1982 the mill was placed on the National Register of Historic Places, but it remained a working mill. In 1998, Walter's son Gary took over the family business when he bought it from his father. By that time, the Swany White Flour Mill had become a Minnesota landmark. When photographer Richard Olsenius spent time in Freeport looking for places that had inspired Garrison Keillor's Lake Wobegon, he photographed Gary Thelen and his mill. Members of local bread clubs would also visit to see how a century-old mill worked.

Swany White Mill burned to the ground on December 27, 2011. No one was injured. The fire was reported at 4:48 P.M. by an employee. It took over five surrounding fire agencies to put out the blaze. That night, people gathered to watch the local landmark burn, with many holding hands and crying. Though he initially claimed that he would not rebuild the mill, Gary Thelen changed his mind, and a new Swany White mill opened in 2012.

== Production ==
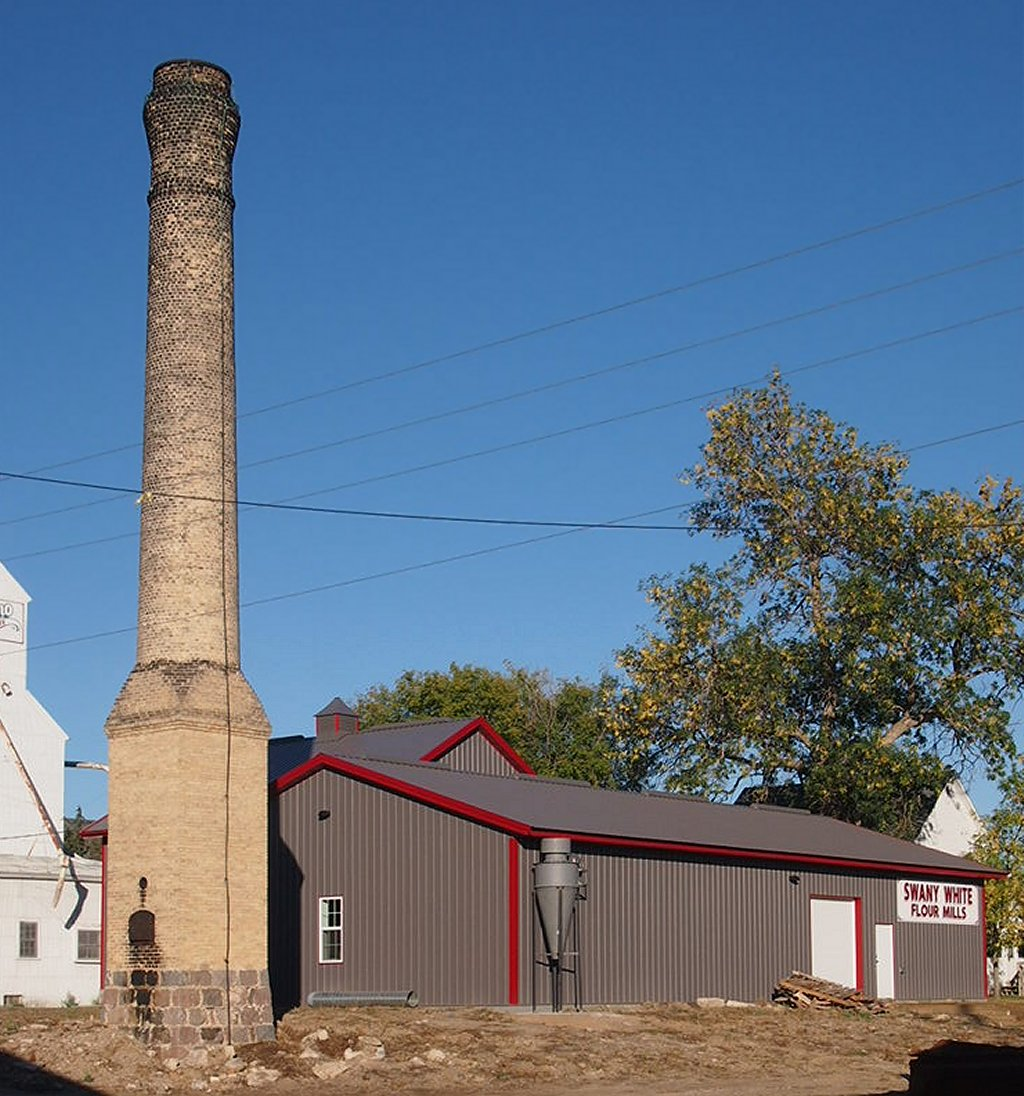
Rear view of the original smokestack and replacement mill building

For white flour, Swany White had used the same milling equipment since 1913. It had a milling capacity of about 1,000 pounds (450 kg) per hour, or 12,000 lb (5,400 kg) per business day. This was a fraction of the milling capacity of most mills. It is notable that Swany White Flour had continued to operate as a small independent while most other small regional producers have either given up or sold out.

For its conventional products, the mill had a commercial presence mainly in the Upper Midwest, however its organic products were distributed more widely. In addition to sales to distributors and retailers, Swany White had a retail outlet at the mill in Freeport. The mill's most popular product was a bleached flour sold under the brand name Faith's Best, which accounted for about 60% of all sales.

== See also ==
- National Register of Historic Places listings in Stearns County, Minnesota
