= Paul Anderson (Minnesota state representative) =

American politician

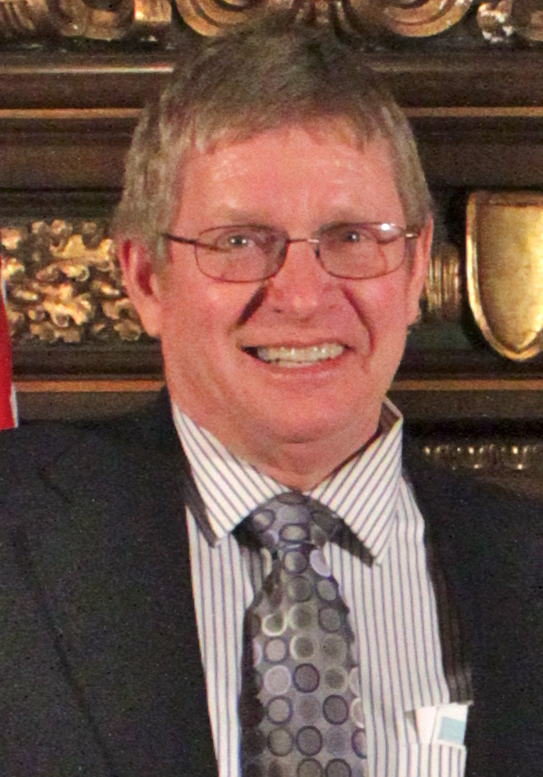

Member of the Minnesota House of Representatives from the 12A district
- Incumbent
- Assumed office January 6, 2009
- Preceded by: Bud Heidgerken

Personal details
- Born: June 15, 1951 (age 75) Starbuck, Minnesota, U.S.
- Party: Republican
- Spouse: Faith
- Children: 3
- Education: University of Minnesota Morris (BA)
- Occupation: Farmer; Legislator
- Website: Government website Campaign website

Paul H. Anderson (born June 15, 1951) is an American politician serving in the Minnesota House of Representatives since 2009. A member of the Republican Party of Minnesota, Anderson represents District 12A in central Minnesota, which includes the cities of Morris and Benson and portions of Big Stone, Pope, Stearns, Stevens and Swift Counties.

== Early education and career ==
Born in Starbuck, Minnesota, Anderson attended Starbuck High School. He graduated from the University of Minnesota, Morris, graduating with a Bachelor of Arts in physical education and education.

Before running for the House, Anderson served as a Pope County commissioner, a member of the Starbuck School Board, and a Starbuck township officer. He is a fourth-generation farmer, and operates a 700-acre farm near Starbuck.

== Minnesota House of Representatives ==
Anderson was elected to the Minnesota House of Representatives in 2008 and has been reelected every two years since. He first ran after three-term Republican incumbent Bud Heidgerken announced he would not seek reelection.

Anderson serves as the minority lead on the Agriculture Finance and Policy Committee and also sits on the Property Tax Division and the Sustainable Infrastructure Policy Committee. From 2015 to 2018, Anderson served as chair of the Agriculture Policy Committee. From 2011 to 2012, he was vice chair of the Agriculture and Rural Development Committee.

=== Agriculture ===
In 2015, after being named Agriculture Policy chair, Anderson supported scaling back environmental regulations and protections, citing opposition from agricultural businesses. As chair, Anderson was often at odds with Governor Mark Dayton, opposing the administration's additional rules and regulations. In 2017, Dayton vetoed the omnibus agriculture finance bill because of a provision that exempts farmers from stricter pesticide label regulations, and was criticized by House and Senate Republican agriculture chairs. In 2018, Anderson supported efforts to delay a state rule aimed at reducing groundwater contamination by farm fertilizers.

Anderson has advocated for stronger farm safety measures, even stating his openness to expanding regulations on small farms. He authored legislation to give farmers rebates to equip tractors with roll bars to reduce accidents.

Anderson has called for year-round E15 ethanol access. He has spoken out against foreign tariffs from China on Minnesota agricultural exports like soybeans and pork.

Anderson opposed a provision allowing Minnesota's four largest cities to regulate pesticides, saying, "it's a solution looking for a problem." He has opposed efforts to increase regulations on pesticides meant to protect pollinators.

=== Other political positions ===
In 2011, Anderson sponsored legislation to have the state subsidize two-thirds of the cost of a $900 million dollar Minnesota Vikings stadium. He stated his openness to supporting Representative Matt Dean's plan to eliminate MinnesotaCare, a public health care program. He introduced legislation that would exempt a zoo in his district from state wildlife law despite their less strict accreditation status.

== Electoral history ==
2008 Minnesota State House - District 13A
Party	Candidate	Votes	%
Republican	Paul Anderson	11,422	58.35
Democratic (DFL)	Bruce Shuck	8,128	41.52
Write-in		24	0.12
Total votes		19,574	100.0
Republican hold			

2010 Minnesota State House - District 13A
Party	Candidate	Votes	%
Republican	Paul Anderson (incumbent)	12,759	98.44
Write-in		202	1.56
Total votes		12,961	100.0
Republican hold			

2012 Minnesota State House - District 12B
Party	Candidate	Votes	%
Republican	Paul Anderson (incumbent)	13,043	66.33
Democratic (DFL)	Rick Rosenfield	6,611	33.62
Write-in		11	0.06
Total votes		19,665	100.0
Republican hold			

2014 Minnesota State House - District 12B
Party	Candidate	Votes	%
Republican	Paul Anderson (incumbent)	9,920	67.84
Democratic (DFL)	Gordon (Gordy) Wagner	4,694	32.10
Write-in		8	0.05
Total votes		14,622	100.0
Republican hold			

2016 Minnesota State House - District 12B
Party	Candidate	Votes	%
Republican	Paul Anderson (incumbent)	18,276	98.23
Write-in		330	1.77
Total votes		18,686	100.0
Republican hold			

2018 Minnesota State House - District 12B
Party	Candidate	Votes	%
Republican	Paul Anderson (incumbent)	12,219	71.33
Democratic (DFL)	Ben Schirmers	4,894	28.57
Write-in		17	0.10
Total votes		17,130	100.0
Republican hold			

2020 Minnesota State House - District 12B
Party	Candidate	Votes	%
Republican	Paul Anderson (incumbent)	17,151	75.01
Democratic (DFL)	Ben Schirmers	5,697	24.92
Write-in		17	0.07
Total votes		22,865	100.0
Republican hold			

2022 Minnesota State House - District 12A
Party	Candidate	Votes	%
Republican	Paul Anderson (incumbent)	13,281	71.07
Democratic (DFL)	Edie Barrett	5,388	28.83
Write-in		18	0.10
Total votes		18,687	100.0
Republican hold			

== Personal life ==
Anderson lives in Starbuck, Minnesota, with his spouse, Faith, and has three children. Former legislator Delbert F. Anderson is his first cousin once removed.
