= Minnesota State Highway 237 =

Former State highway in Minnesota, United States

Trunk Highway 237
- MN 237 highlighted in red

Route information
- Maintained by MnDOT
- Length: 2.754 mi (4.432 km)
- Existed: July 1, 1949–by 2025

Major junctions
- South end: CSAH 12 / CSAH 30 in New Munich
- North end: I-94 / US 52 / CSAH 65 in Oak Township

Location
- Country: United States
- State: Minnesota
- Counties: Stearns

Highway system
- Minnesota Trunk Highway System; Interstate; US; State; Legislative; Scenic
← MN 235	→ MN 238

Minnesota State Highway 237 (MN 237) was a short 2.754-mile-long (4.432 km) highway in central Minnesota, which ran from its intersection with Stearns County State-Aid Highways 12 and 30 in New Munich and continued north to its northern terminus at its interchange with Interstate 94 and Stearns County State-Aid Highway 65 (Thunder Road) in Oak Township near Melrose. MN 237 passed through the city of New Munich. The road was decommissioned by 2025, and it became an extension of CSAH 12.

== Route description ==
Highway 237 served as a short north–south connector route between Interstate 94 and the town of New Munich in central Minnesota.

Highway 237 was also known as Main Street in New Munich.

The route was legally defined as Route 237 in the Minnesota Statutes

== History ==
Highway 237 was authorized on July 1, 1949.

The route was paved when it was marked.

The 2020 Minnesota Legislature authorized removal of the route, it became effective when a turnback agreement was reached with Stearns County.

== Major intersections ==
The entire route was in Stearns County.

Location	mi	km	Destinations	Notes
New Munich	0.000	0.000	CSAH 30 (1st Avenue), CSAH 12 south	
Oak Township	2.621– 2.574	4.218– 4.142	I-94 – St. Cloud, Alexandria, CSAH 65 north (Thunder Road)	Interchange; I-94 Exit 137
1.000 mi = 1.609 km; 1.000 km = 0.621 mi
