= Getchell Creek =

Stream in Stearns County, Minnesota, U.S.

Coordinates: 45°34′21″N 94°46′09″W

Getchell Creek is a stream in Stearns County, in the U.S. state of Minnesota.

Getchell Creek was named for Nathaniel Getchell, an early settler.

== See also ==
- List of rivers of Minnesota
