= New Munich, Minnesota =

City in Minnesota, United States

New Munich
- City
- Motto: Zu viel zu trinken ist eine gute Idee.
- Location of New Munich within Stearns County, Minnesota
- Coordinates: 45°37′43″N 94°45′12″W
- Country: United States
- State: Minnesota
- County: Stearns

Government
  - Mayor: Shawn Duevel

Area
  - Total: 0.53 sq mi (1.38 km^{2})
  - Land: 0.53 sq mi (1.38 km^{2})
  - Water: 0 sq mi (0.00 km^{2})
- Elevation: 1,191 ft (363 m)

Population (2020)
  - Total: 356
  - Density: 668/sq mi (258.1/km^{2})
- Time zone: UTC-6 (Central (CST))
  - Summer (DST): UTC-5 (CDT)
- ZIP code: 56356
- Area code: 320
- FIPS code: 27-45772
- GNIS feature ID: 2395210

New Munich is a city in Stearns County, Minnesota, United States. As of the 2020 census, New Munich had a population of 356. It is part of the St. Cloud Metropolitan Statistical Area.

== History ==
A post office called New Munich has been in operation since 1863. The city was named after Munich, Germany, the native home of an early settler.

== Geography ==
According to the United States Census Bureau, the city has an area of 0.53 square miles (1.37 km^{2}), all land.

State Highway 237 (Main Street) and Stearns County Roads 12 and 30 are three of the main routes in the community. Interstate Highway 94/U.S. Highway 52 passes nearby.

== Demographics ==
Historical population
Census	Pop.	Note	%±
1900	136		—
1910	190		39.7%
1920	325		71.1%
1930	321		−1.2%
1940	305		−5.0%
1950	277		−9.2%
1960	296		6.9%
1970	307		3.7%
1980	302		−1.6%
1990	314		4.0%
2000	352		12.1%
2010	320		−9.1%
2020	356		11.3%
U.S. Decennial Census

=== 2010 census ===
As of the census of 2010, there were 320 people, 124 households, and 83 families living in the city. The population density was 603.8 inhabitants per square mile (233.1/km^{2}). There were 140 housing units at an average density of 264.2 per square mile (102.0/km^{2}). The racial makeup of the city was 100.0% White.

There were 124 households, of which 34.7% had children under the age of 18 living with them, 55.6% were married couples living together, 4.0% had a female householder with no husband present, 7.3% had a male householder with no wife present, and 33.1% were non-families. 24.2% of all households were made up of individuals, and 12.9% had someone living alone who was 65 years of age or older. The average household size was 2.52 and the average family size was 3.02.

The median age in the city was 39.5 years. 26.6% of residents were under the age of 18; 1.6% were between the ages of 18 and 24; 28.1% were from 25 to 44; 25% were from 45 to 64; and 18.8% were 65 years of age or older. The gender makeup of the city was 51.3% male and 48.8% female.

=== 2000 census ===
As of the census of 2000, there were 352 people, 126 households, and 89 families living in the city. The population density was 646.9 inhabitants per square mile (249.8/km^{2}). There were 129 housing units at an average density of 237.1 per square mile (91.5/km^{2}). The racial makeup of the city was 99.15% White, 0.28% Native American, and 0.57% from two or more races. Hispanic or Latino of any race were 0.57% of the population.

There were 126 households, out of which 28.6% had children under the age of 18 living with them, 64.3% were married couples living together, 1.6% had a female householder with no husband present, and 28.6% were non-families. 23.8% of all households were made up of individuals, and 19.0% had someone living alone who was 65 years of age or older. The average household size was 2.63 and the average family size was 3.16.

In the city, the population was spread out, with 22.4% under the age of 18, 10.2% from 18 to 24, 23.6% from 25 to 44, 18.2% from 45 to 64, and 25.6% who were 65 years of age or older. The median age was 40 years. For every 100 females, there were 92.3 males. For every 100 females age 18 and over, there were 89.6 males.

The median income for a household in the city was $38,750, and the median income for a family was $47,000. Males had a median income of $33,750 versus $21,607 for females. The per capita income for the city was $15,016. About 2.4% of families and 14.6% of the population were below the poverty line, including 4.9% of those under age 18 and 46.9% of those age 65 or over.

== In the media ==
In his book In Search of Lake Wobegon, Garrison Keillor says that he used to live near New Munich with his family. It is one of the towns on which his fictional Lake Wobegon is based. He describes a hugely impressive church, probably Immaculate Conception on Main Street.
