= Southeast Minnesota =

Geographic and cultural region of the U.S. state of Minnesota

Coordinates: 44°N 92°W

One example of regions in Minnesota, with the Southeast region including Rice, Steele, Freeborn, Goodhue, Dodge, Mower, Wabasha, Olmsted, Fillmore, Winona, and Houston counties.

Southeast Minnesota comprises the corner of the U.S. state of Minnesota south of the Twin Cities metropolitan area extending east, and part of the multi-state area known as the Driftless Area. Rochester is the largest city in the area; other major cities include Winona, Owatonna, Faribault, Northfield, Austin, and Red Wing.

Many places in Southeast Minnesota, like Lanesboro, have become popular tourist destinations. The scenic Mississippi Valley to the Whitewater River and Root River in the Driftless Area (one of the few parts of the state not eroded by glaciers in the last ice age) are among the most visited locations.

== History ==
Early inhabitants of what is now Southeast Minnesota included the Dakota, the Ojibwe, and the Ho-Chunk. Some of the first settlers were French, Canadian, and British fur traders who often married local indigenous women. The 1851 Treaty of Traverse des Sioux and the Treaty of Mendota ceded much of the regionto the U.S government. Like other parts of eastern Minnesota, Euro-American settlement increased following the 1851 treaty. Many of these settlers were born in North America, and moving from states like Maine and New York. The first large wave of European immigrants arrived soon after the land was opened to settlement, often joining people they already knew. European immigrants came from Norway, Sweden, Germany, England, Ireland, Czech Republic, as well as Finland, Poland, Russia, Italy, and more.

Early rail lines like the Minnesota Central Railway (1865) which became the Milwaukee Road, and the Winona and St. Peter Railroad (1867) connected Southeast Minnesota with Saint Paul, as well as major cities throughout the Midwest such as Chicago and St. Louis. Rail lines linked small communities and moved agricultural products throughout the region.

== Economy ==
Healthcare, manufacturing, and agriculture feature prominently in Southeast Minnesota. Rochester is home to Mayo Clinic, and more than one in four workers in the region were employed in healthcare as of May 2025. As of September 2024, 21.9% of statewide employment in Food Manufacturing was in the Southeast region, with animal slaughtering and processing leading in terms of number of jobs.

== Politics ==
Southeast Minnesota is part of the state's first and second congressional districts. Culturally, it is distinct from the Twin Cities in being generally more conservative and staid, with several more diverse areas, such as the college towns of Northfield and Winona. However, the area has become more diverse and more politically competitive.

Until 2006, the state's only Independence Party legislator was from Southeast Minnesota, Sheila Kiscaden (IP-Rochester, now DFL-Rochester). Formerly a Republican, Kiscaden is now officially a member of the Minnesota Democratic-Farmer-Labor Party. The area is one of several distinct regions of Minnesota.

Additionally, future Democratic Governor Tim Walz won the First District Congressional seat in 2006; he ultimately served six terms in the US House. He returned to Minnesota to run successfully for Governor in 2018. Walz was reelected in 2022 and is now in the final year of his second term. Nominated as the Democratic candidate for Vice-President, as the running mate of Kamala Harris who eventually lost to Donald Trump, Walz had considered running for a third term as Governor, but in part due to the political fallout over fraud allegations, some of which proved to be true, though apparently not connected to Walz, he later decided not to seek a third term.

== Population ==
As of 2022, the population of Southeast Minnesota was 517,713. 86% of the population of Southeast Minnesota reported being white alone. 6.1% of the total population reported being of Hispanic or Latino origin, 4.0% as Black or African American, 3.4% as Asian or other Pacific Islander, 2.1% as some other race, and 0.3% reported being American Indian & Alaska Native, with 4.3% being two or more races.

In 2021, the Minnesota Department of Employment and Economic Development stated about 6.8% of the total population was foreign-born, slightly ahead of statewide growth. Foreign-born immigrants came from all parts of the world, and included those born in Vietnam, Cambodia, Laos, China, Korea, India, Mexico as well as other parts of Latin America, and Somalia, Kenya, and Ethiopia.

Although Southeast Minnesota is not necessarily clearly delineated, some of the more populous counties as of the 2020 Census include:

- Olmsted County (county seat Rochester) - 162,847
- Rice County (county seat Faribault) - 67,097
- Winona County (county seat Winona) - 49,671
- Goodhue County (county seat Red Wing) - 47,582
