= Geography of Minnesota =

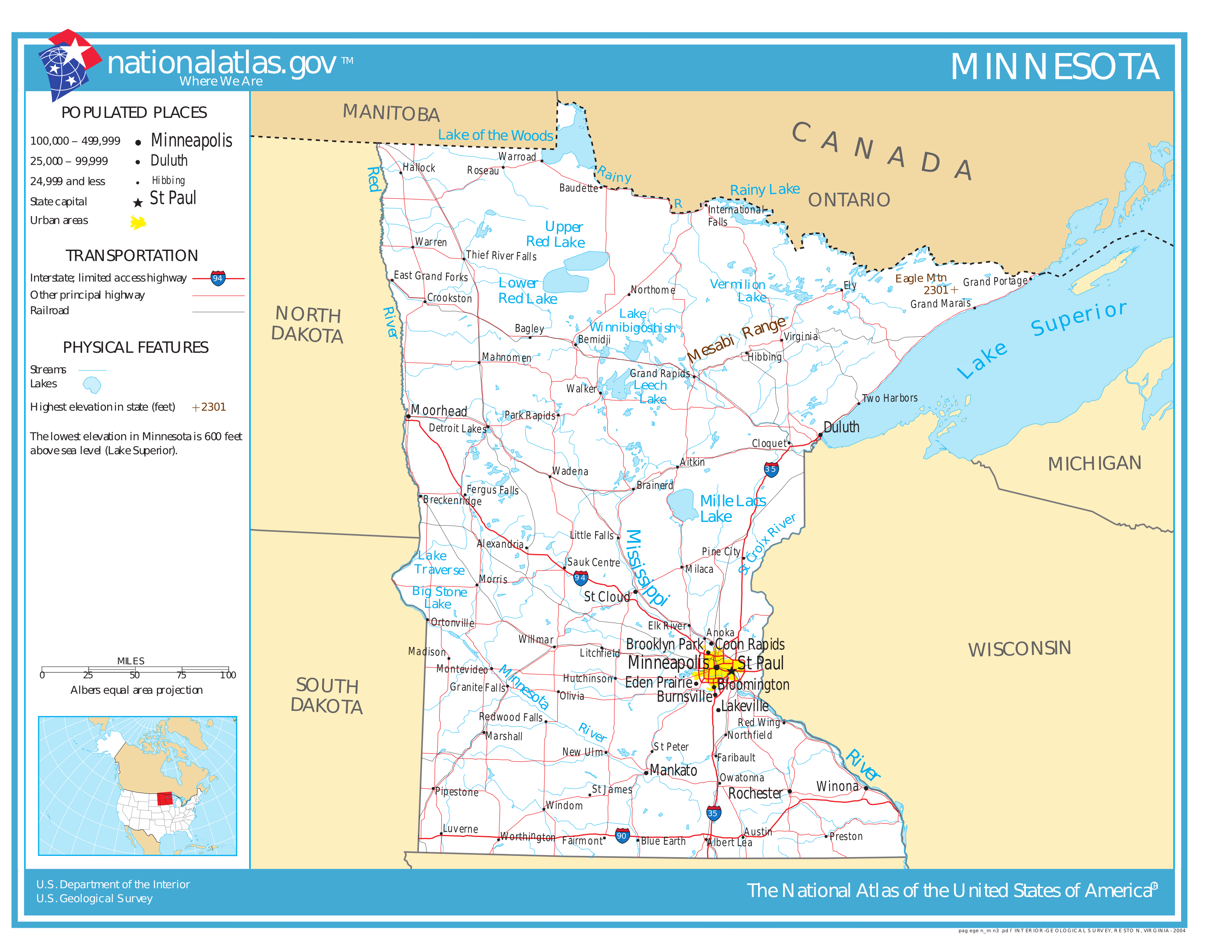
Minnesota, showing major roads, railroads, and bodies of water

The U.S. state of Minnesota is the northernmost state outside Alaska; its isolated Northwest Angle in Lake of the Woods is the only part of the 48 contiguous states lying north of the 49th parallel north. Minnesota is in the U.S. region known as the Upper Midwest in interior North America. The state shares a Lake Superior water border with Michigan and Wisconsin on the northeast; the remainder of the eastern border is with Wisconsin. Iowa is to the south, South Dakota and North Dakota are to the west, and the Canadian provinces of Manitoba and Ontario are to the north. With 87,014 square miles (225,370 km^{2}), or approximately 2.26% of the United States, Minnesota is the 12th largest state.

== Geology and terrain ==
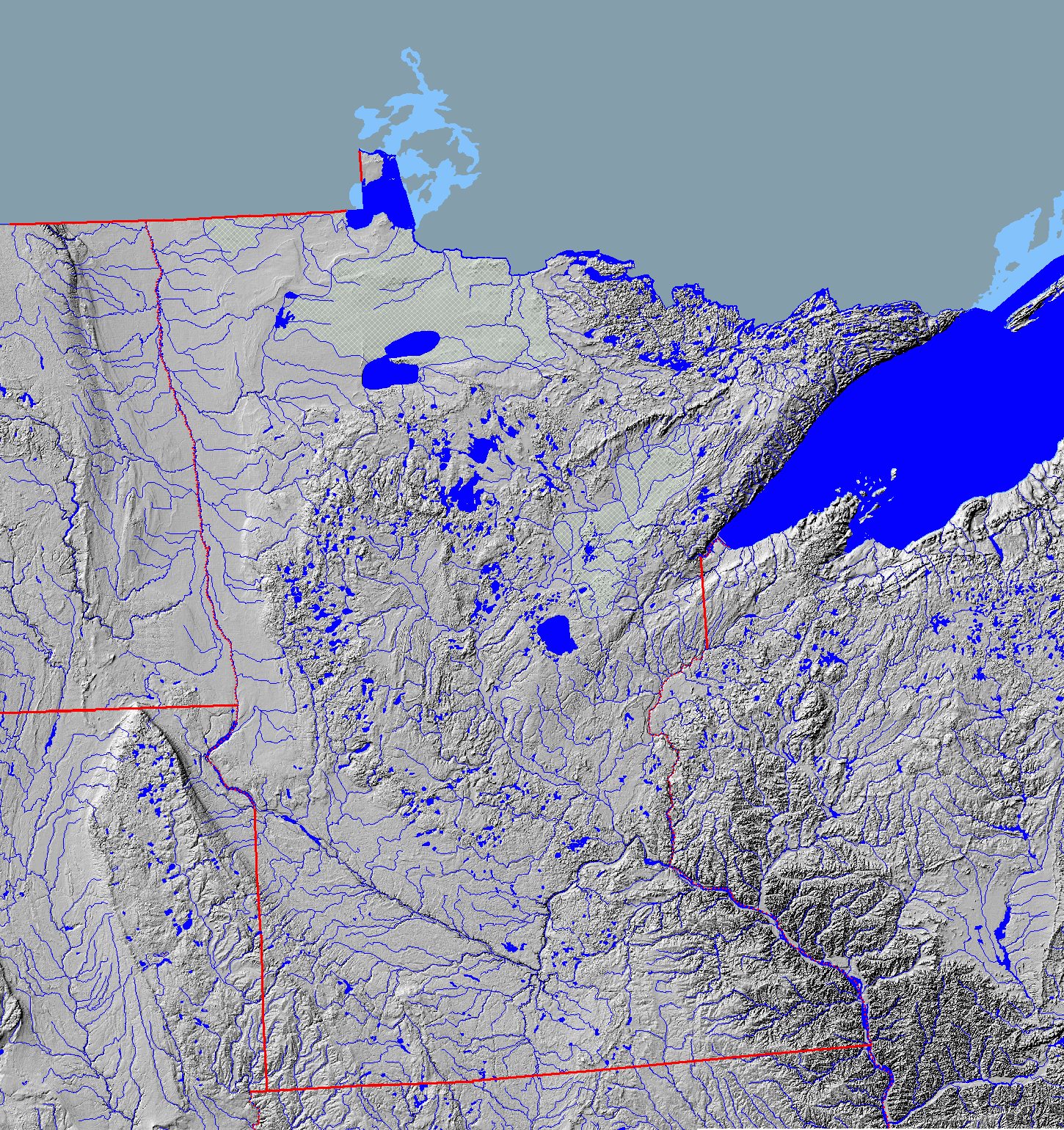
Topographical map of Minnesota

Watersheds of Minnesota: Red River in greens; St. Lawrence in reds; and Mississippi in purples & teals

Minnesota contains some of the oldest rocks found on earth, gneisses some 3.6 billion years old, or 80% as old as the planet. About 2.7 billion years ago, basaltic lava poured out of cracks in the floor of the primordial ocean; this volcanic activity created the Canadian Shield in northeast Minnesota. The roots of these volcanic mountains and the action of Precambrian seas formed the Iron Range of northern Minnesota. Following a period of volcanic activity 1.1 billion years ago, Minnesota's geological activity has been more subdued, with no volcanism or mountain formation, but with repeated incursions of the sea which left behind multiple strata of sedimentary rock.

In more recent times, massive ice sheets at least one kilometer thick ravaged the landscape of the state and sculpted its current terrain. The Wisconsin glaciation left 12,000 years ago. These glaciers covered all of Minnesota except the far southeast, an area characterized by steep hills and streams that cut into the bedrock. This area is known as the Driftless Zone for its absence of glacial drift. Much of the remainder of the state outside the northeast has 50 feet (15 m) or more of glacial till deposited when the last glaciers melted. 13,000 years ago gigantic Lake Agassiz formed in the northwest; the lake's outflow, the Glacial River Warren, carved the valley of the Minnesota River, and its bed became the fertile lands of the Red River valley. Minnesota is geologically quiet today; it experiences earthquakes infrequently, and most of them are minor.

The state's high point is Eagle Mountain at 2,301 feet (701 m), which is only 13 miles (21 km) away from the low of 602 feet (183 m) at the shore of Lake Superior. Relatively high elevations are also found in the Leaf Hills in Otter Tail County. Notwithstanding dramatic local differences in elevation, much of the state is a gently rolling peneplain.

Two continental divides meet in the northeastern part of Minnesota in rural Hibbing, forming a triple watershed. Precipitation there can follow the Mississippi River south to the Gulf of Mexico, the St. Lawrence Seaway east to the Atlantic Ocean, or the Hudson Bay watershed to the Arctic Ocean.

The state's nickname, The Land of 10,000 Lakes, is no exaggeration; there are 11,842 lakes ten or more acres in size. The Minnesota portion of Lake Superior is the largest at 962,700 acres (3,896 km^{2}) and deepest (at 1,290 ft (390 m), 393 m) body of water in the state. Minnesota has 6,564 natural rivers and streams that cumulatively flow for 69,000 miles (111,000 km). The Mississippi River begins its journey from its headwaters at Lake Itasca and crosses the Iowa border 680 miles (1,094 km) downstream. It is joined by the Minnesota River at Fort Snelling, by the St. Croix River near Hastings, by the Chippewa River at Wabasha, and by many smaller streams. The Red River, in the bed of glacial Lake Agassiz, drains the northwest part of the state northward toward Canada's Hudson Bay. Approximately 10.6 million acres (42,900 km^{2}) of wetlands are contained within Minnesota's borders, the most of any state outside Alaska.

== Flora and fauna ==
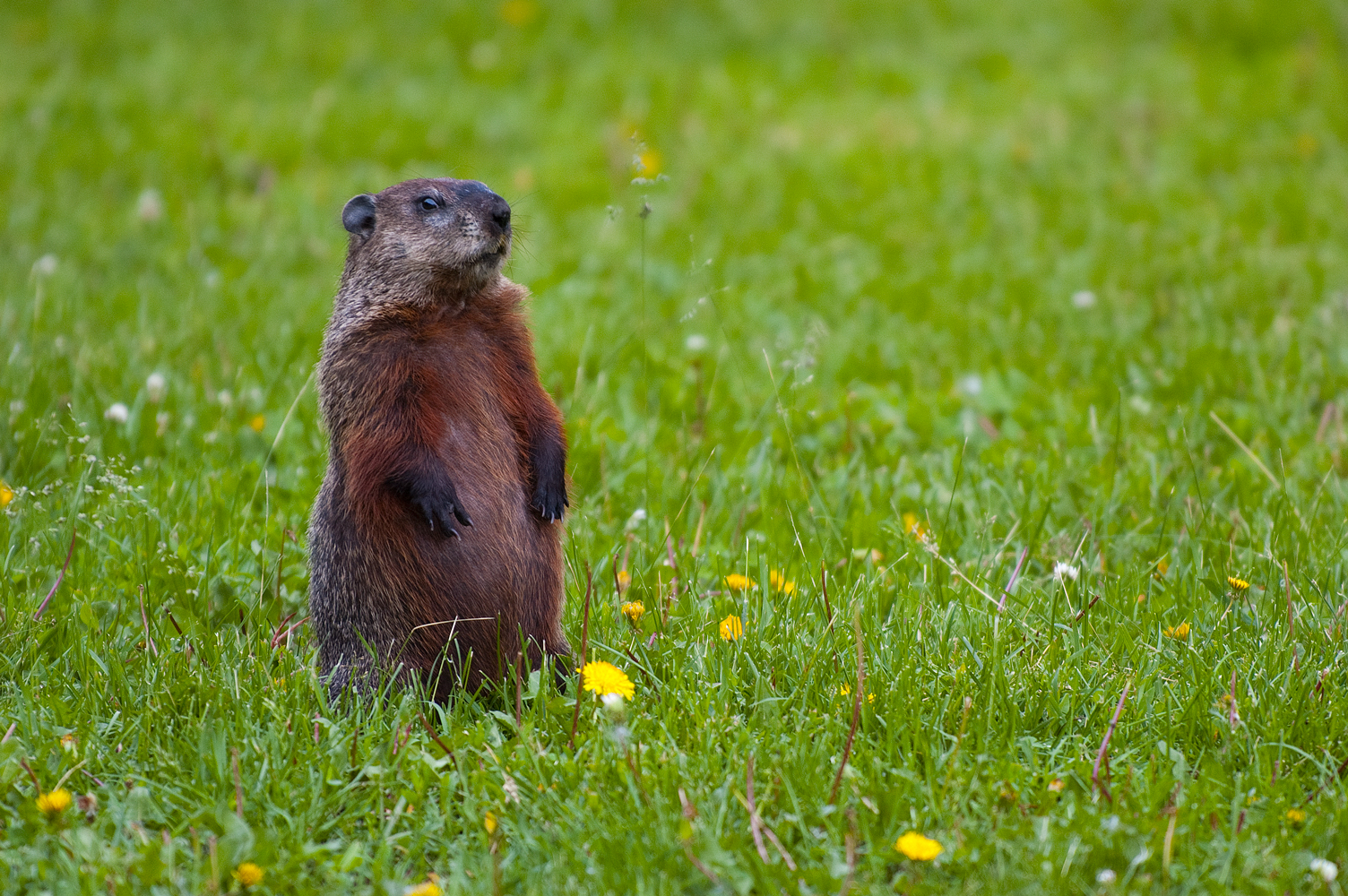
A groundhog seen in Minneapolis, along the banks of the Mississippi River

Three of North America's biomes converge in Minnesota: prairie grasslands in the southwestern and western parts of the state, the Big Woods deciduous forest of the southeast, and the northern boreal forest. The northern coniferous forests are a vast wilderness of pine and spruce trees mixed with patchy stands of birch and poplar. Much of Minnesota's northern forest has been logged, leaving only a few patches of old growth forest today in areas such as in the Chippewa National Forest and the Superior National Forest where the Boundary Waters Canoe Area Wilderness has some 400,000 acres (1,600 km^{2}) of unlogged land. Although logging continues, regrowth keeps about one third of the state forested. While loss of habitat has affected native animals such as the pine marten, elk, and bison, whitetail deer and bobcat thrive. The state has the nation's largest population of timber wolves outside Alaska, and supports healthy populations of black bear and moose. Located on the Mississippi Flyway, Minnesota hosts migratory waterfowl such as geese and ducks, and game birds such as grouse, pheasants, and turkeys. It is home to birds of prey including the bald eagle, red-tailed hawk, and snowy owl. The lakes teem with sport fish such as walleye, bass, muskellunge, and northern pike, and streams in the southeast are populated by brook, brown, and rainbow trout.

== Climate ==
Minnesota map of Köppen climate classification

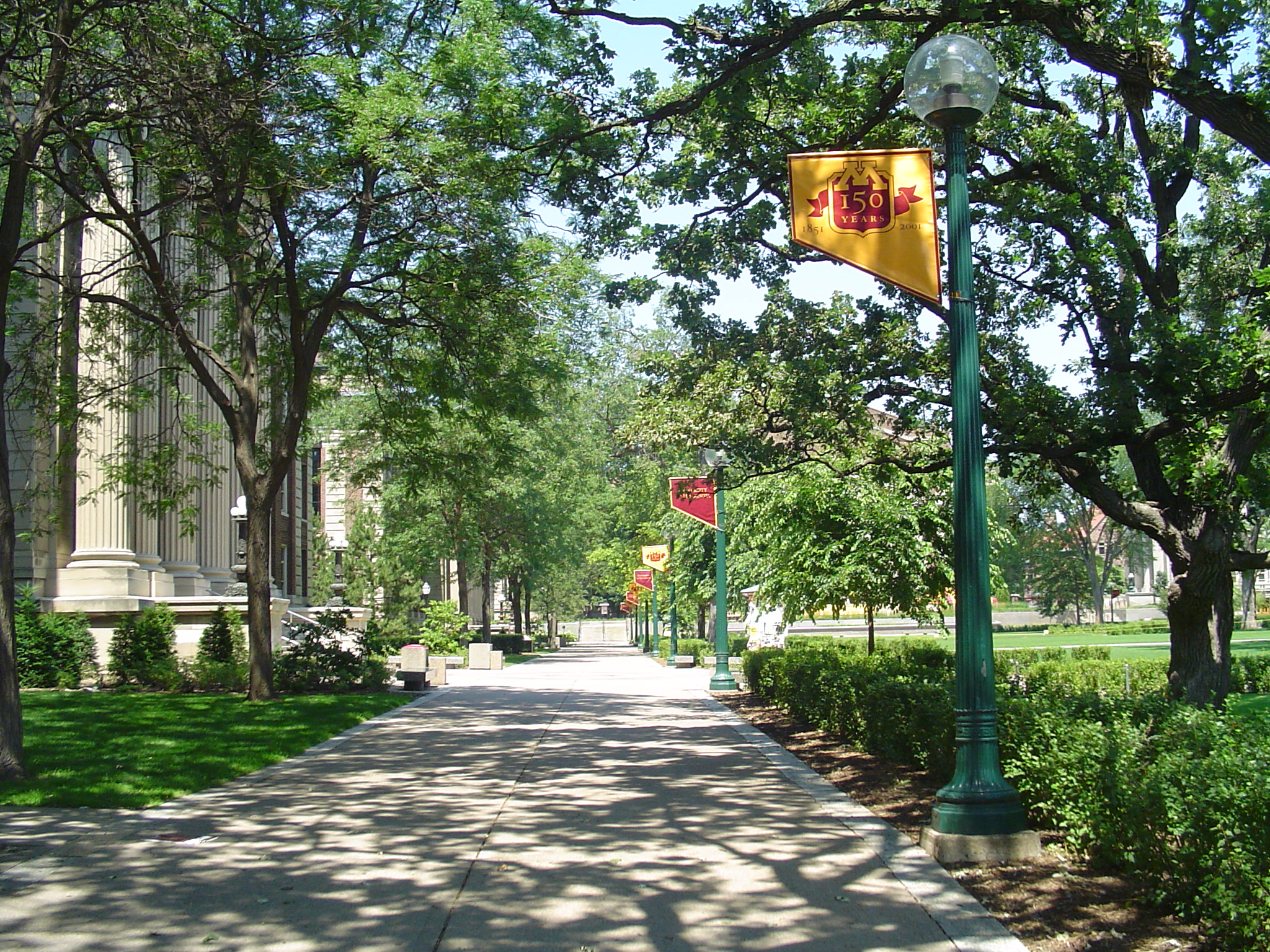
A summertime view of the University of Minnesota Twin Cities campus

Minnesota endures temperature extremes characteristic of its continental climate; with cold winters and hot summers, the record high and low span 174 degrees Fahrenheit (79 °C). Meteorological events include rain, snow, hail, blizzards, polar fronts, tornadoes, thunderstorms, and high-velocity derechos and downbursts. The growing season varies from 90 days per year in the Iron Range to 160 days in southeast Minnesota near the Mississippi River, and mean average temperatures range from 36 to 49 °F (2 to 9 °C). Average summer dewpoints range from about 58 °F (14 °C) in the south to about 48 °F (9 °C) in the north. Depending on location, average annual precipitation ranges from 19 to 35 in (48 to 89 cm), and droughts occur every 10 to 50 years.

== Protected lands ==
Minnesota is home to a variety of wilderness, park, and other open spaces. Minnesota's first state park, Itasca State Park, was established in 1891, and is the source of the Mississippi River. Today Minnesota has 72 state parks and recreation areas, 58 state forests covering about four million acres (16,000 km^{2}), and numerous state wildlife preserves, all managed by the Minnesota Department of Natural Resources. There are 5.5 million acres (22,000 km^{2}) in the Chippewa and Superior National Forests. The Superior National Forest in the northeast contains the Boundary Waters Canoe Area Wilderness, which encompasses over a million acres (4,000 km^{2}) and a thousand lakes. To its west is Voyageurs National Park, the state's only national park.

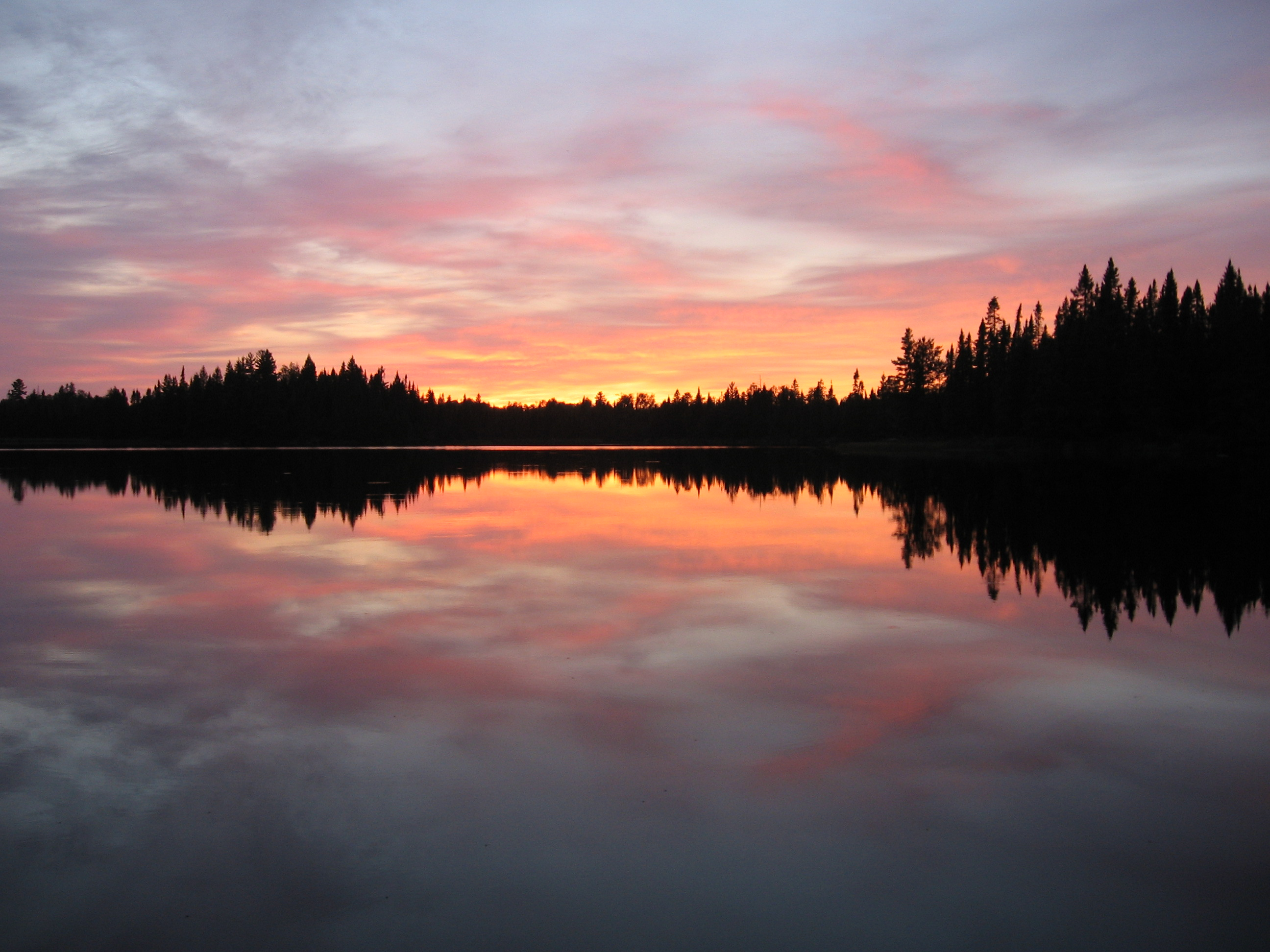
Pose Lake in the Boundary Waters Canoe Area Wilderness

== Regions ==
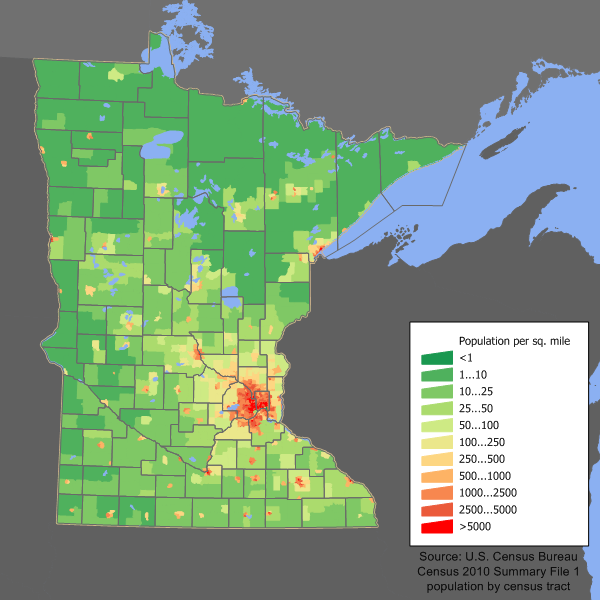
Minnesota population distribution, showing density

The US state of Minnesota can be divided into regions in a variety of ways. On a basic level, the state is divided between the Minneapolis–Saint Paul or Twin Cities metropolitan area (often referred to locally as The Cities), and Outstate or Greater Minnesota. The distinction between the metropolitan counties and the outstate area was codified in 1967 with the Minnesota legislature's creation of the state's Metropolitan Council.

The Minneapolis-St. Paul metropolitan area comprises eleven Minnesota counties centered on Minneapolis, the state's largest city, and adjoining Saint Paul, the capital; plus two Wisconsin counties. About three out of every five residents of the state live in this conurbation.

Greater Minnesota is less urbanized than the Twin Cities. It is also geographically more diverse, with farmlands to the south and west, lake country in central Minnesota, and forests in the northern part of the state. Approximately 40% of Minnesotans live in Greater Minnesota. Its major population centers include Duluth, Rochester, Moorhead, St. Cloud, Mankato, and Winona.

- Politically, Minnesota contains eight congressional districts.
- Climatologically, the state varies considerably from the far north, near Canada and Lake Superior, to the south, where fertile farm land borders Iowa, South Dakota, and Wisconsin.
- Demographically, population density varies from less than 4 persons per square mile in the least developed areas to 8,000 persons per square mile in Minneapolis.
- Geologically, variations exist due to ice cover during the last Ice Age.
- Culturally and economically, areas of the state vary with respect to industry, predominant professions, and urbanization.

The geographic regions discussed here have combined elements from several of these various criteria to divide the state into areas recognized by the typical Minnesotan. Disagreements concerning the exact boundaries are to be expected, however, the exact boundary definitions are not necessary to adequately define the state's regions. Large areas of the state are sometimes referred to historically and politically as Southern Minnesota or Northern Minnesota to refer to areas outside of the Twin Cities Metropolitan area but stretch across multiple regions due to climate, agriculture, political views, school systems and other relations.

- The Arrowhead Region is the far northeastern part of Minnesota. Its name comes from the shape of the area north of Lake Superior, and it is centered around Duluth. It includes two of the three iron ranges in Minnesota. Collectively the Mesabi and Vermillion iron ranges are called the Iron Range and colloquially as "the Range." These parts of the Arrowhead are dotted with iron mines. The Arrowhead region also includes the North Shore and the Boundary Waters.
- Although no legal boundaries of the region exist, most definitions of what makes up Central Minnesota would include the parts of the state within the economic influence of St. Cloud.
- The Northwest Angle is that land of Minnesota north of the 49th parallel latitude line.
- Southeastern Minnesota includes the scenic Mississippi Valley, Whitewater, Zumbro and Root Rivers in the Coulee Region, also known as the Driftless Area or “Bluff Country”. Its primary city is Rochester, and to a lesser extent, Winona and La Crosse, WI.
- Southwestern Minnesota includes the Buffalo Ridge, which is the eastern portion of the Coteau des Prairies, a geological formation characterized by higher elevation and high average wind speed, providing opportunities for commercially viable wind power. The area also includes the Pipestone Region.
- The Minnesota River Valley follows the state's namesake, a fertile agricultural area, running from the South Dakota border to its junction with the Mississippi River in St. Paul.
- "Northern Minnesota" is a broader title that includes several regions, including the North Woods, and can be defined as any area within the 218 telephone area code. Examples of cities include Brainerd, Bemidji, Grand Rapids and International Falls.
- The Red River Valley is a term the U.S. government uses to generally describe the sections of eastern North Dakota and northwestern Minnesota to which the U.S. secured title following the Anglo-American Convention of 1818. Popularly, it is used to refer to most of the territory in the northwestern part of the state. Specifically, the area in the Fargo-Grand Forks media market is called the Red River Valley by media outlets (referring to both the Dakota and Minnesota parts).
- "South Central Minnesota" refers to a group of fewer than a dozen counties loosely centered on the city of Mankato. It is essentially an alternate name for the Minnesota River Valley, with a slightly extended area to include towns such as Owatonna.
- The Twin Cities Metropolitan area includes 13 counties, two of which are in Wisconsin. It is a socio-economic area driven by the twin cities of Minneapolis and the state capital, Saint Paul.
