= Hole in the Mountain Prairie =

Coordinates: 44.232°N 96.296°W

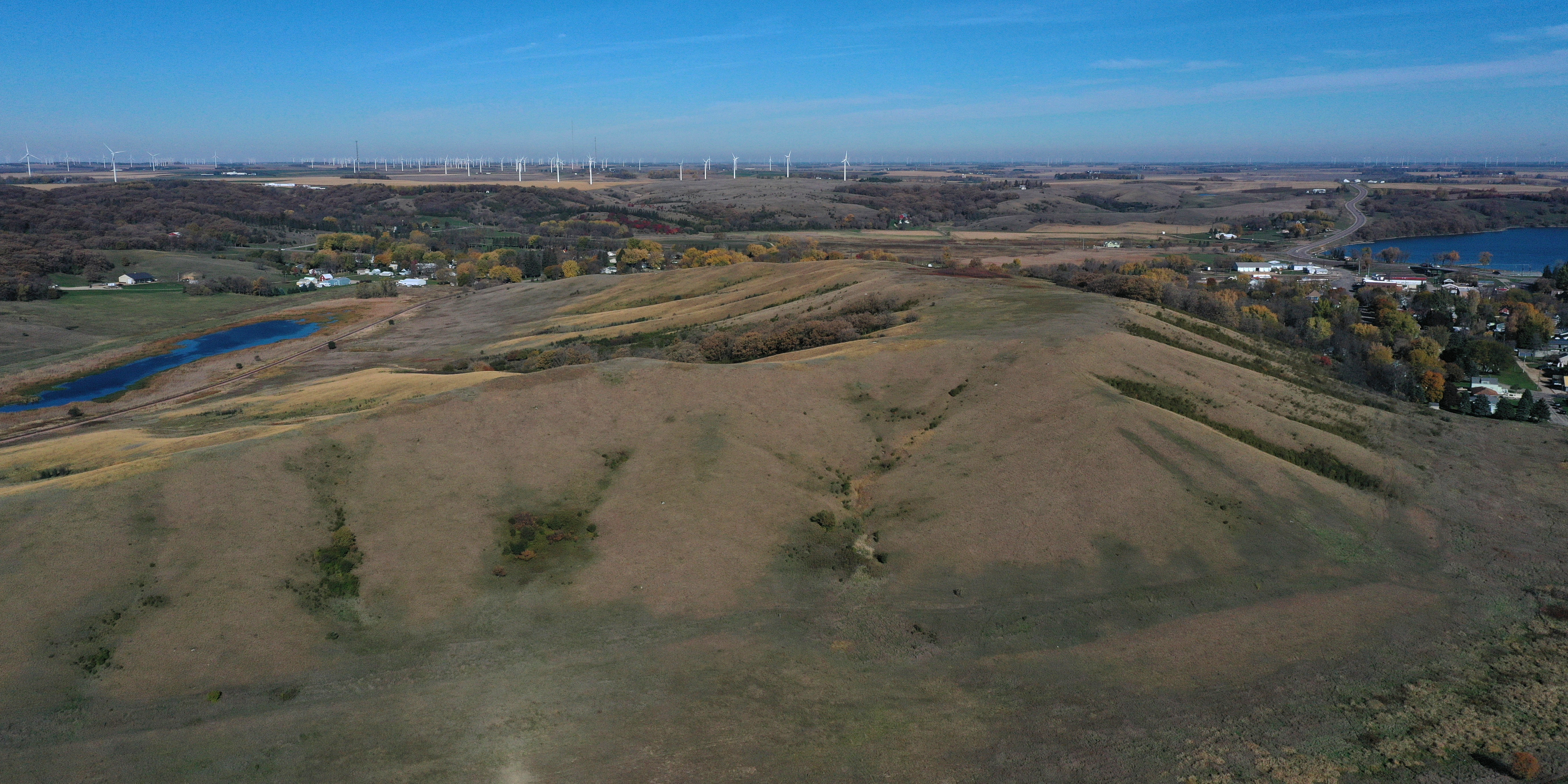
- Location: Lincoln County, Minnesota
- Nearest city: Lake Benton

Hole in the Mountain Prairie is a preserved remnant of the tallgrass prairie in southwestern Minnesota. It is owned and administered by The Nature Conservancy.

== Geography ==
Hole in the Mountain Prairie is located on Buffalo Ridge near the town of Lake Benton in Lincoln County, southwestern Minnesota. It spans a valley of about a half-mile in width, with a total area of 1,364 acres (5.5 km^{2}).

== Flora ==
The preserve is home to about 60 species of grasses and emergent vegetation, and about 200 species of wildflowers. Trees are a minor feature, with only about 10 species present.

== Fauna ==
Whitetail deer, foxes, and numerous rodents are present, but The Nature Conservancy touts the butterflies of Hole in the Mountain as the most unusual and significant of its creatures. In 2017 an attempt was made by the Minnesota Zoo to reintroduce the nearly-extinct Dakota Skipper butterfly to Hole in the Mountain, from which it had disappeared in the previous decade.

== Geology ==
The preserve is located in a valley of Buffalo Ridge, which is in turn a portion of the Coteau des Prairies, a highland which originates in South Dakota and runs about 200 miles (320 km) south and southeast through part of Minnesota and into northwestern Iowa.
