= Buffalo Ridge Wind Farm =

Large wind farm near Lake Benton, Minnesota, United States

Coordinates: 44°17′N 96°20′W

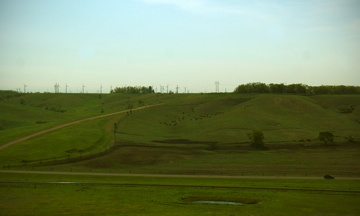
Wind turbines on Buffalo Ridge

Buffalo Ridge Wind Farm is a large wind farm on Buffalo Ridge near Lake Benton, Minnesota, United States.

== History ==
In 1994, a Minnesota legislative mandate increased the demand for wind power in Minnesota. Buffalo Ridge's geography is well suited for wind power and it has been heavily developed for this purpose. The history of modern wind power activity on Buffalo Ridge can be split into four phases of construction.

In 1994, the first wind farm cluster was built on Buffalo Ridge, northwest of the town of Lake Benton. This first cluster was built by the Kenetech Corporation and runs northwest to Lake Shaokatan; it consists of seventy-three wind turbines.

The second phase occurred in 1998 when Zond Energy Systems built the next wind farm cluster near Hendricks, Minnesota. This farm consists of 143 Zond Z-750 wind turbines with each turbine standing 257 feet (78 m) high and weighing about 196,000 pounds (89,000 kg). Each 750 kW turbine can deliver the annual electricity needs of approximately 250 homes.

The third phase occurred in mid-1999 and added an additional one hundred megawatts of power to the existing output.

In 2006, PPM Energy and Xcel Energy began construction of a one hundred and fifty megawatt project called the MinnDakota Wind Power Project. This project adds sixty-seven more wind turbines to the Buffalo Ridge wind farm. It also adds turbines to the portion of Buffalo Ridge that is in Brookings County, South Dakota.

The land where the wind farm resides is privately owned farm land. To acquire a piece of this land for the use of wind turbines, the wind developer rents or leases the plot of land from the farmer who owns the land. Small projects, less than two megawatts in size, are offered subsidies of 1.5 cents per kilowatt-hour for power sold to utilities.

=== Birds, bats, and wind turbines ===
Concerns involved with wind turbines revolve around the affected bird and bat populations that surround the Buffalo Ridge area. A study featured in The American Midland Naturalist found that eighty-four to eighty-five percent of the seventy species of birds that live in the Buffalo Ridge area fly outside the range of the wind turbine blades. During a study conducted in 1996, by Western EcoSystems Technology, it was concluded that an estimated average of 1.4 birds were killed per wind turbine during the seven-month study. Another eight-month study was done in 1997 and found that 1.1 birds were killed per turbine. Also, available evidence from the "Interim Report: Bat Interactions with Wind Turbines at the Buffalo Ridge, Minnesota Wind Resource Area: 2001 Field Season," shows that most bat mortalities caused by wind turbines occur during the fall to migrant and dispersing bats and not to resident breeding populations. It was concluded by this same study that 2.45 to 3.21 bats die per turbine which is lower than the number of bat deaths by lighthouses, communication towers, tall buildings, power lines, and fences.

In 1996, Western EcoSystems Technolygy was contracted by Northern States Power to create an avian monitoring program for Buffalo Ridge. Its primary goals for Buffalo Ridge were to evaluate the risks to avian species by monitoring the wind power development and its effect on the avian species while at the same time using that information to reduce avian mortalities on Buffalo Ridge. According to the studies, bird populations are in more danger from humans than from wind turbines.
