= Winona and St. Peter Freight Depot =

Railroad depot in southern Minnesota

- U.S. National Register of Historic Places
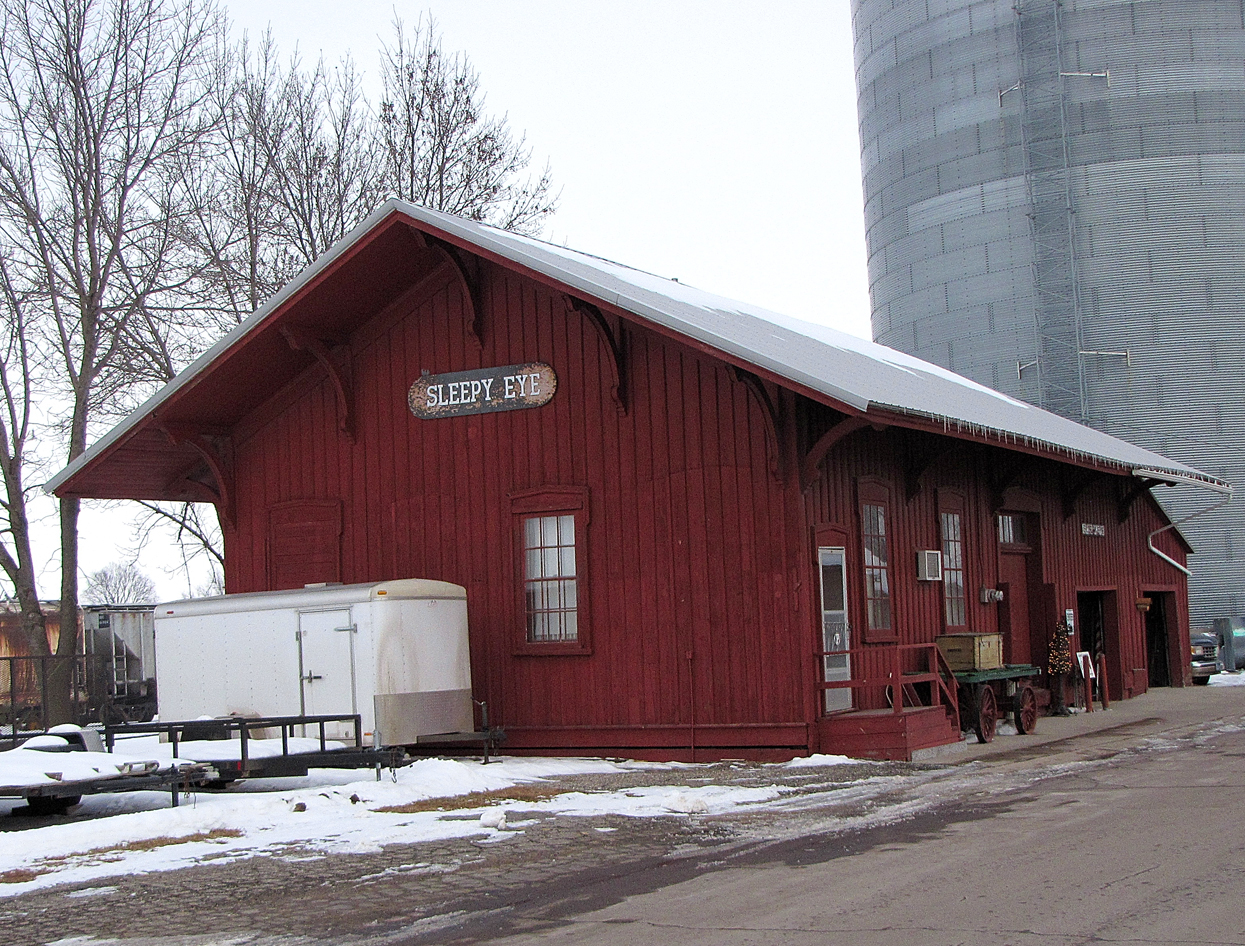

- Location within Minnesota
- Location: Oak St., NE, Sleepy Eye, Minnesota
- Coordinates: 44°17′55″N 94°43′16″W
- Area: less than one acre
- Built: 1885
- Architect: Winona & St. Peter Railroad
- MPS: Brown County MRA
- NRHP reference No.: 79001216
- Added to NRHP: December 31, 1979

The Winona and St. Peter Freight Depot in Sleepy Eye, Minnesota is a former station on the Chicago and Northwestern Railroad. The station was originally built by the Winona and St. Peter Railroad and initially served as a combination passenger and freight terminal until a brick station next door was built in 1902. The station was listed on the National Register of Historic Places in 1979. The freight depot is the earliest known surviving building associated with the early years of railroad development in Brown County.

The Winona and St. Peter Railroad was the first railroad to cross Brown County. It entered the county near New Ulm, passed through Sleepy Eye and continued westward across the county, eventually reaching Watertown, South Dakota in 1873. A local history account says that an early settler near Sleepy Eye Lake sold part of his land to a lawyer representing the railroad, and the lawyer and the settler platted the town of Sleepy Eye Lake in 1872. The town was later renamed to Loreno, then back to Sleepy Eye.

A separate depot for passenger traffic was built a block west in 1902. That depot, the Chicago and North Western Depot (Sleepy Eye, Minnesota), is now a museum and is also listed on the National Register.
