= Lake Benton, Minnesota =

City in Minnesota, United States

- City
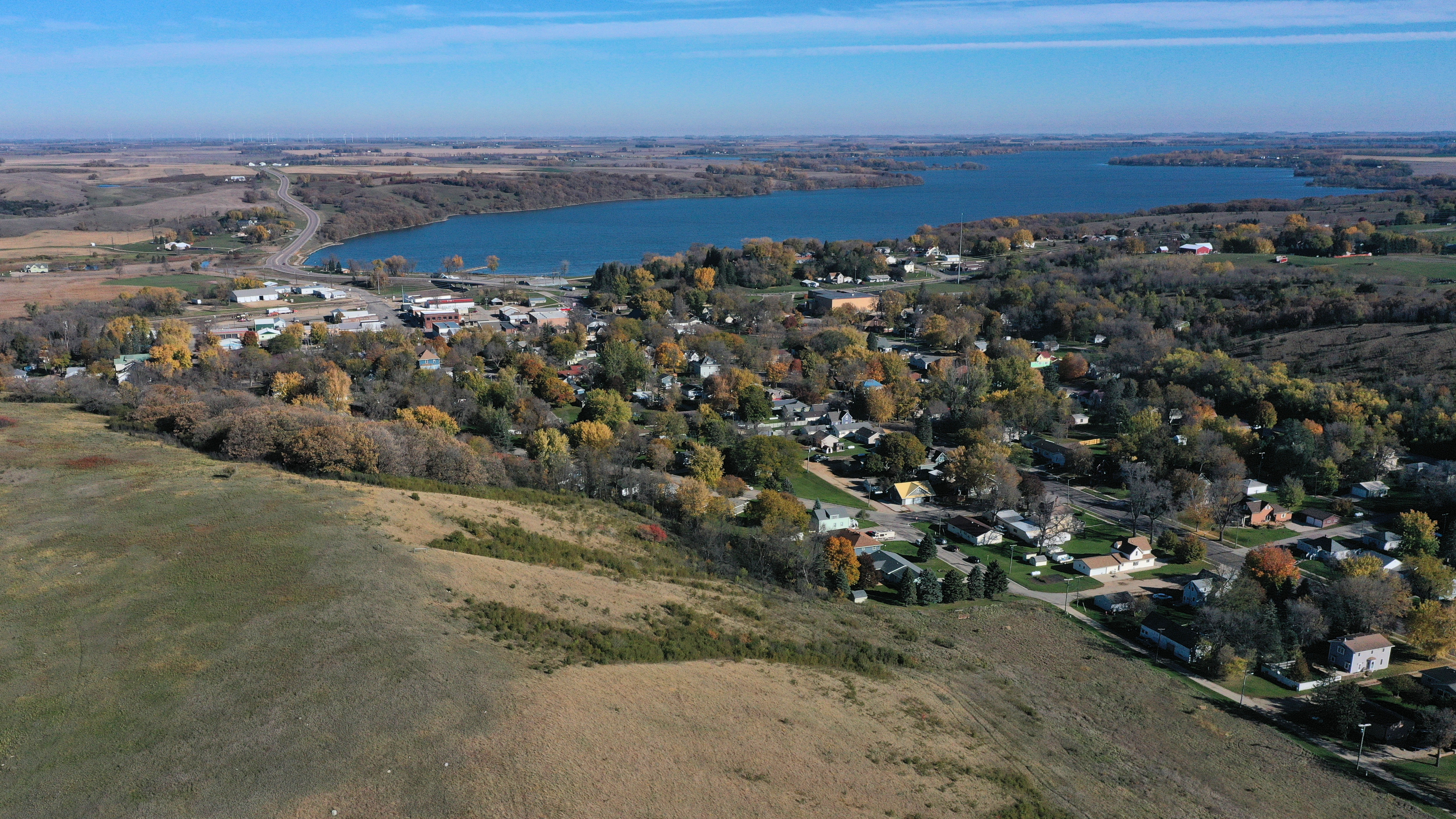
- Viewed from Hole in the Mountain Prairie

- Location of Lake Benton within Lincoln County, Minnesota
- Coordinates: 44°15′51″N 96°17′21″W
- Country: United States
- State: Minnesota
- County: Lincoln

Area
  - Total: 4.05 sq mi (10.50 km^{2})
  - Land: 3.20 sq mi (8.30 km^{2})
  - Water: 0.85 sq mi (2.19 km^{2})
- Elevation: 1,752 ft (534 m)

Population (2020)
  - Total: 687
  - Density: 214.3/sq mi (82.74/km^{2})
- Time zone: UTC-6 (Central (CST))
  - Summer (DST): UTC-5 (CDT)
- ZIP code: 56149
- Area code: 507
- FIPS code: 27-34100
- GNIS feature ID: 2395586
- Website: www.lakebentonminnesota.com

Lake Benton is a city in Lincoln County, Minnesota, United States. The population was 687 at the 2020 census.

Lake Benton is also the name of the approximately seven-mile-long (11 km) lake adjacent to the city of Lake Benton. The town is on the Buffalo Ridge, and is the site for the radio tower of KARZ-FM in Marshall.

The area is the site of Exelon Wind's Norgaard Wind Project.

== History ==
A post office called Lake Benton has been in operation since 1873. Lake Benton was platted in 1879, and the city took its name from nearby Lake Benton. The county seat was located at Lake Benton from 1882 until 1902.

== Lake Benton School ==
There has been a school in Lake Benton since 1876, but Lake Benton Public School was formally established in 1917.

The Lake Benton School District has won Athletic State Championships in 2 states: Minnesota and South Dakota.

The Lake Benton Bobcats high school football team won back-to-back MSHSL 9-Man Football State Championships in 1973 and 1974 under MFCA Hall of Fame Head Coach Andy Nelson, who also led them to additional State Tournament appearances in 1978 and 1980, as well as one final appearance in 1984 as the Lake Benton/Verdi Bobcats.

The Elkton-Lake Benton Lady Elks high school Girls Basketball team appeared in 3 SDHSAA Girls Basketball State Tournaments over 4 years, finishing as the 2008-09 Class B Runner-Up, 2009-10 Class A State Champions and 2011-12 Class A 3rd Place under longtime Lake Benton Bobcats Girls Basketball Head Coach Steve Krause, who was named SDHSCA 2010 Girls Basketball Coach of the Year.

== Geography ==
According to the United States Census Bureau, the city has a total area of 4.62 square miles (11.97 km^{2}), of which 3.78 square miles (9.79 km^{2}) is land and 0.84 square miles (2.18 km^{2}) is water.

U.S. Highways 14 and 75 are two of the main routes in the community.

== Demographics ==
Historical population
Census	Pop.	Note	%±
1880	184		—
1890	513		178.8%
1900	890		73.5%
1910	844		−5.2%
1920	944		11.8%
1930	903		−4.3%
1940	961		6.4%
1950	863		−10.2%
1960	905		4.9%
1970	759		−16.1%
1980	869		14.5%
1990	693		−20.3%
2000	703		1.4%
2010	683		−2.8%
2020	687		0.6%
U.S. Decennial Census

=== 2010 census ===
As of the census of 2010, there were 683 people, 338 households, and 177 families living in the city. The population density was 180.7 inhabitants per square mile (69.8/km^{2}). There were 383 housing units at an average density of 101.3 per square mile (39.1/km^{2}). The racial makeup of the city was 98.7% White, 0.1% African American, and 1.2% from two or more races. Hispanic or Latino of any race were 0.3% of the population.

There were 338 households, of which 20.1% had children under the age of 18 living with them, 43.5% were married couples living together, 5.0% had a female householder with no husband present, 3.8% had a male householder with no wife present, and 47.6% were non-families. 44.1% of all households were made up of individuals, and 26% had someone living alone who was 65 years of age or older. The average household size was 2.02 and the average family size was 2.76.

The median age in the city was 48.8 years. 21.1% of residents were under the age of 18; 6.2% were between the ages of 18 and 24; 19.5% were from 25 to 44; 24.8% were from 45 to 64; and 28.1% were 65 years of age or older. The gender makeup of the city was 48.8% male and 51.2% female.

=== 2000 census ===
As of the census of 2000, there were 703 people, 334 households, and 196 families living in the city. The population density was 183.8 inhabitants per square mile (71.0/km^{2}). There were 365 housing units at an average density of 95.4 per square mile (36.8/km^{2}). The racial makeup of the city was 97.72% White, 1.00% Native American, 0.28% Asian, 0.28% from other races, and 0.71% from two or more races. Hispanic or Latino of any race were 0.71% of the population.

There were 334 households, out of which 21.9% had children under the age of 18 living with them, 50.0% were married couples living together, 5.7% had a female householder with no husband present, and 41.3% were non-families. 39.2% of all households were made up of individuals, and 24.9% had someone living alone who was 65 years of age or older. The average household size was 2.09 and the average family size was 2.78.

In the city, the population was spread out, with 21.6% under the age of 18, 5.4% from 18 to 24, 21.8% from 25 to 44, 22.3% from 45 to 64, and 28.9% who were 65 years of age or older. The median age was 47 years. For every 100 females, there were 89.0 males. For every 100 females age 18 and over, there were 82.5 males.

The median income for a household in the city was $29,583, and the median income for a family was $36,750. Males had a median income of $29,125 versus $21,750 for females. The per capita income for the city was $15,922. None of the families and 5.7% of the population were living below the poverty line, including no under eighteens and 12.2% of those over 64.
