= Winona and St. Peter Engine House =

- U.S. National Register of Historic Places
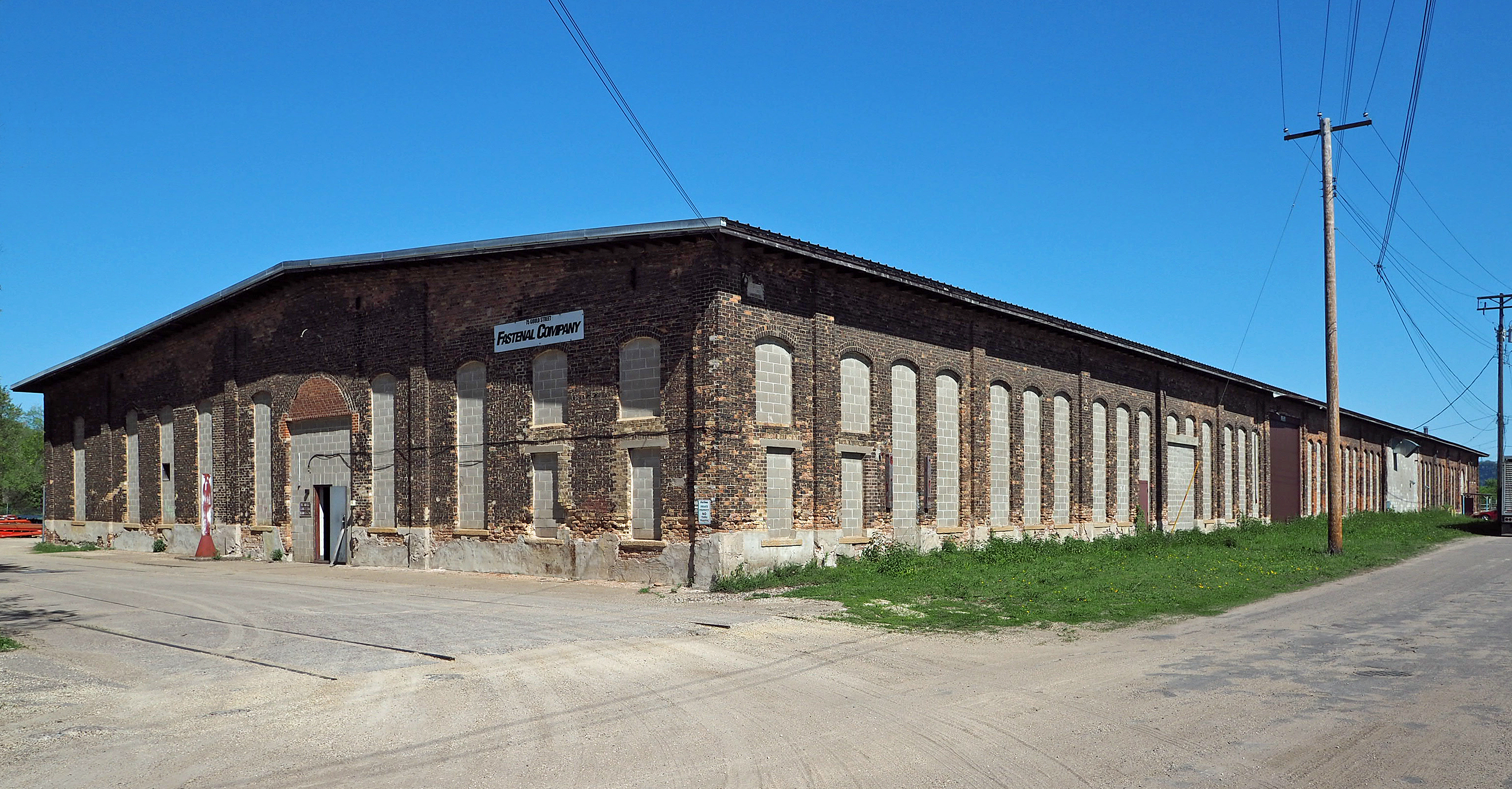
- The Winona and St. Peter Engine House viewed from the southeast

- Location within Minnesota Location within the United States
- Location: 75 Gould Street, Winona, Minnesota
- Coordinates: 44°3′26″N 91°40′7″W
- Area: 1.36 acres (0.55 ha)
- Built: c. 1890
- NRHP reference No.: 84001730
- Designated: January 12, 1984

The Winona and St. Peter Engine House is a former engine house in Winona, Minnesota, United States. It was built around 1890 by the Winona and St. Peter Railroad, a subsidiary of the Chicago and North Western Transportation Company. The building was listed on the National Register of Historic Places in 1984 for having local significance in the theme of transportation. It was nominated for being the sole surviving structure of a railroad shop complex that was a major local employer and a component of the rail network that fueled Winona's economy.

The building continued to function as a locomotive shop until the Chicago and North Western relocated its maintenance operations from Winona. Since 1965, the building has been used as a warehouse and is now occupied by the Fastenal company, based in Winona.

== See also ==
- National Register of Historic Places listings in Winona County, Minnesota
