= Winona & St. Peter Railroad Co. v. Barney =

Winona & St. Peter R. Co. v. Barney
- Supreme Court of the United States

Argued December 4 – December 5, 1884 Decided March 2, 1885
- Full case name: Winona & St. Peter R. Co. v. Barney
- Citations: 113 U.S. 618 (more) 5 S. Ct. 606; 28 L. Ed. 1109

Court membership
- Chief Justice Morrison Waite Associate Justices Samuel F. Miller · Stephen J. Field; Joseph P. Bradley · John M. Harlan; William B. Woods · Stanley Matthews; Horace Gray · Samuel Blatchford

Case opinion
- Majority: Field, joined by unanimous

Winona & St. Peter R. Co. v. Barney, 113 U.S. 618 (1885), was a case in brought to the United States Supreme Court involving public land grants to a state to aid in constructing railroads which contained a description which would be difficult to give full effect if used in an instrument of private conveyance.

By the Act of March 3, 1857, the United States Congress granted to the then Territory of Minnesota, in aid of the construction of certain railroads, certain alternate sections of lands along the lines of the roads, and further provided:

In case it shall appear that the United States have, when the lines or routes of said roads and branches are definitely filed, sold any sections or any parts thereof granted as aforesaid, or that the right of preemption has attached to the same, then it shall be lawful for any agent or agents, to be appointed by the governor of said territory or future state, to select, subject to the approval of the Secretary of the Interior, from the lands of the United States . . . so much land . . . as shall be equal to such lands as the United States have sold or otherwise appropriated, or to which the rights of preemption have attached as aforesaid" &c. Held that the indemnity clause in this act covers losses from the grant by reason of sales and the attachment of preemption rights previous to the date of the act, as well as by reason of sales and the attachment of preemption rights between that date and the final determination of the route of the road. Railroad Co. v. Baldwin, 103 U. S. 126, distinguished. Leavenworth Railroad Co. v. United States, 92 U. S. 733, explained. The Act of March 3, 1865, 13 Stat. 526, enlarged the grant made to Minnesota by the Act of March 3, 1857, from six sections per mile to ten sections, and the limits within which the indemnity lands were to be selected to twenty sections, and further provided that "Any lands which may have been granted to the Territory or Minnesota for the purpose of aiding in the construction of any railroad, which lands may be located within the limits of this extension of said grant or grants, shall be deducted from the full quantity of the lands hereby granted."

The reservation of the lands previously granted to Minnesota from the grant of the additional four sections—that is, from the extension of the original grant of 1857—was only a legislative declaration of that which the law would have pronounced independently of it. Previous grants of the same property would necessarily be excluded from subsequent ones. The only embarrassment in the construction of the section arises from the inapt words used to describe the land from which the previous grant is to be deducted. The language of the section is

That any lands which may have been granted to the Territory or State of Minnesota for the purpose of aiding in the construction of any railroad, which lands may be located within the limits of this extension of such grant or grants, shall be deducted from the full quantity of lands hereby granted.

The only lands granted by the act of 1865 were the four sections for each mile additional to the original six, accompanied with a right to select indemnity lands within twenty miles of the road. The words "the full quantity granted" only denote the entire extension. To the extent of the previous grant that extension must be reduced, even if the whole be taken. Those words did not transfer the loss from the ten sections within which the grant falls to other sections along the line. The sections in which such grant falls are correspondingly reduced.

It followed that where the grant previously made to Minnesota to aid in the construction of the Minnesota and Cedar Valley Railroad interferes with the extension of the grant to the defendant by the act of 1865, the extension must be abandoned. The earlier grant takes the land which would otherwise be added to the original six sections. The court below therefore erred in holding that the Winona and St. Peter Railroad was entitled to ten full sections where such interference occurred, without deducting the lands previously granted to the state. The cause must therefore go back that the proper deduction may be made by reason of this interference of the two grants, and the elder grant be deducted from the extension made by the act of 1865.

The decree was reversed and the cause remanded with directions to take further proceedings in accordance with this opinion.

== See also ==
- List of United States Supreme Court cases, volume 113
- Winona and St. Peter Railroad
