= Winona Subdivision =

Short railway line of the Union Pacific in Winona, Minnesota

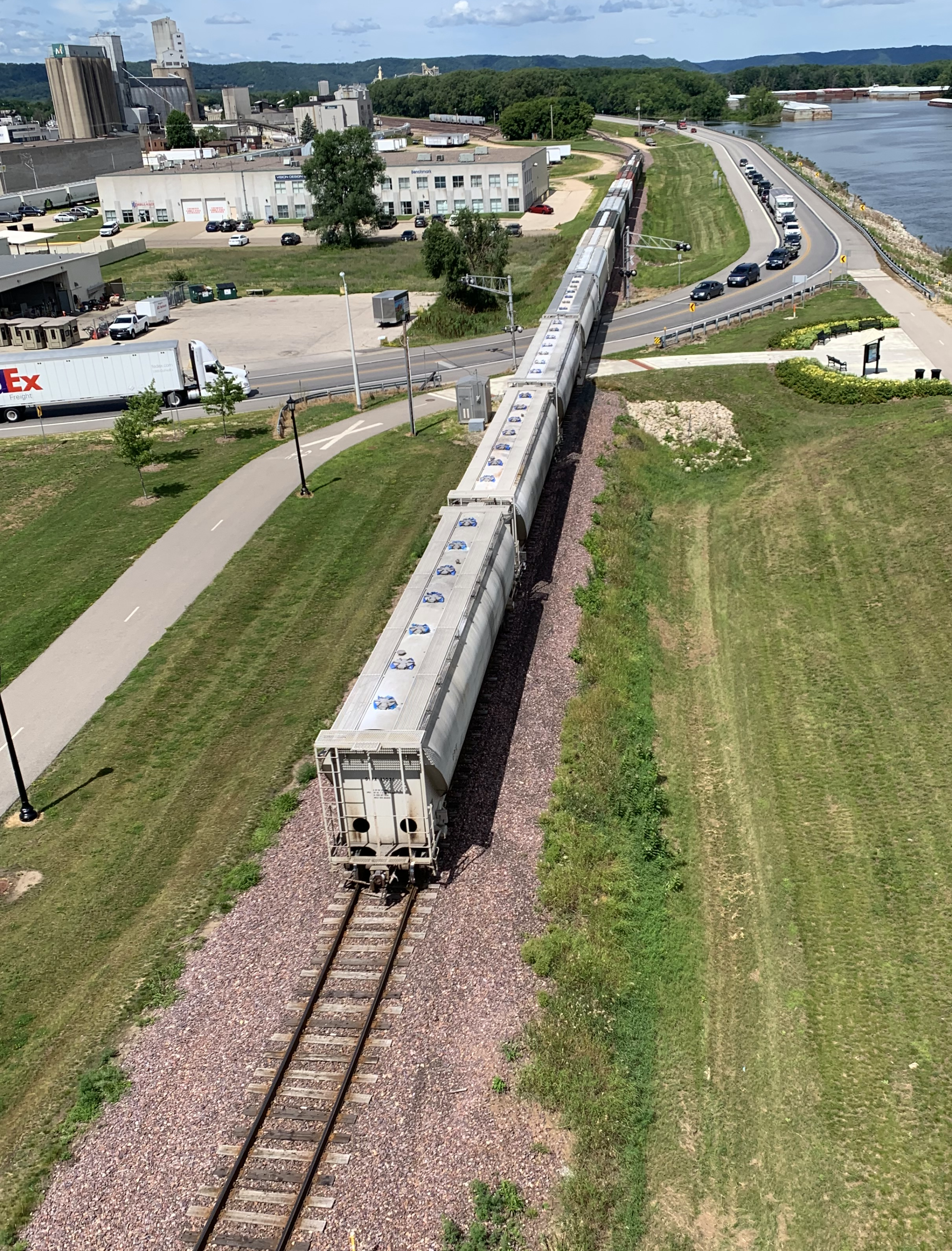
Winona Subdivision Rail Line

The Winona Subdivision or Winona Sub is a railway line operated by Union Pacific Railroad. The Union Pacific owns 1.8 miles (2.9 km) of rail in downtown Winona, Minnesota. The UP reaches Winona using the River Subdivision and Tomah Subdivision of the Canadian Pacific Railway. The railroad services the Winona Terminal area on the Mississippi River.

This was the original starting point of the Winona and St. Peter Railroad. It became the starting point for the Chicago and North Western Railway Minnesota Division, and then their Dakota Division. The C&NW sold off most of the Dakota division to the Dakota, Minnesota and Eastern Railroad. It kept the downtown Winona trackage to switch the barge terminal and businesses. The track from Tunnel City, Wisconsin to the Winona Rail Bridge eventually was abandoned when the tunnel collapsed in March 1973. The Chicago and North Western rerouted to the older Milwaukee tunnel. The CNW route, to Onalaska and Winona, is now abandoned west of the 1910 tunnel. The Winona Rail bridge was no longer used by 1977 and the swing span was removed in 1980. The Union Pacific Railroad, which purchased the C&NW, has trackage rights from Tunnel City through La Crosse on the Canadian Pacific track. These rights date from the C&NW tunnel collapse in 1973.

The office is located at 50 Harvester Avenue in Winona.
