= Winona Rail Bridge =

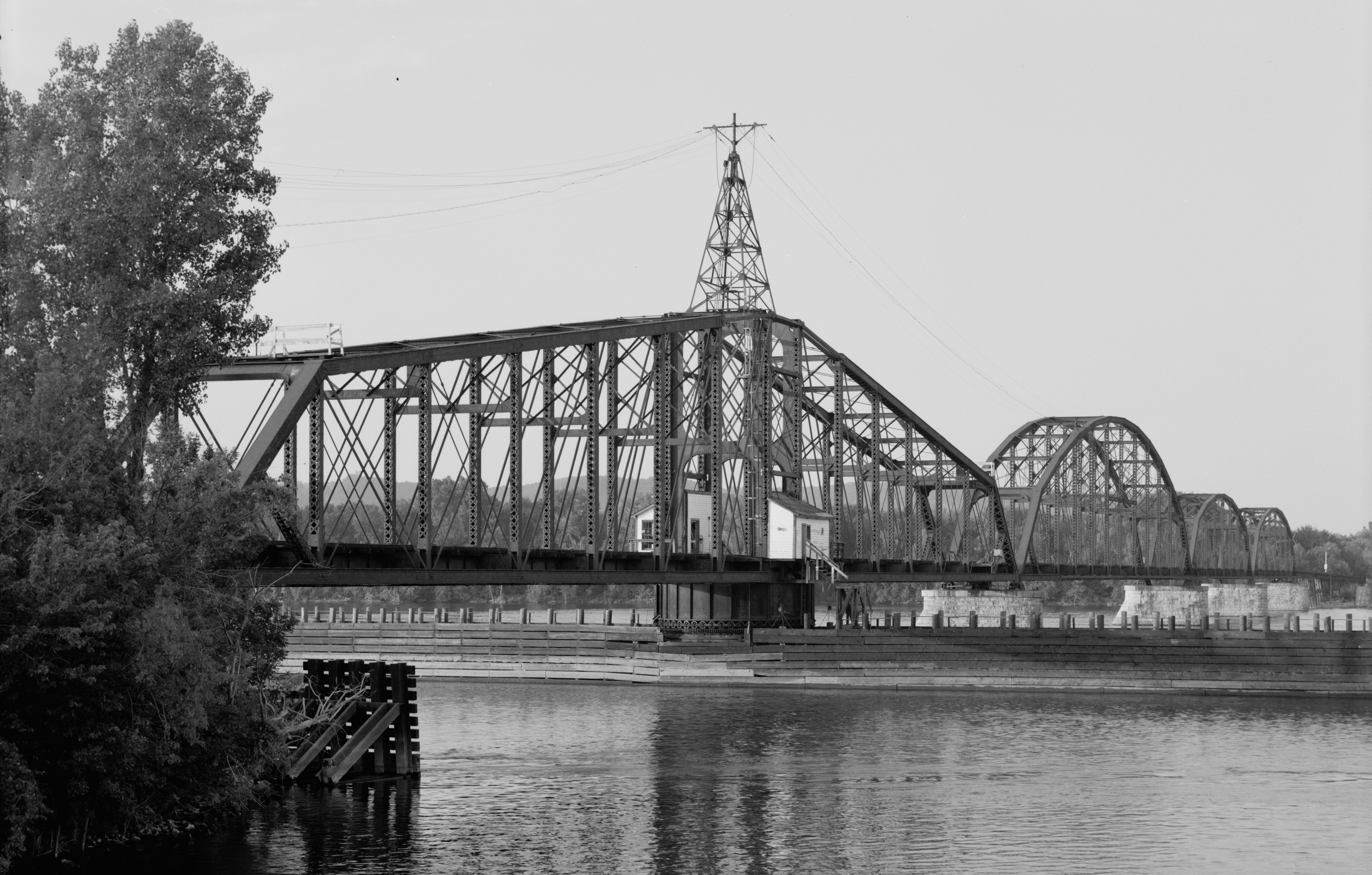
- Coordinates: 44°03′24″N 91°38′19.8″W
- Carries: Chicago and North Western Railroad
- Crosses: Mississippi River
- Locale: Winona, Minnesota, Buffalo, Buffalo County, Wisconsin
- Maintained by: Chicago and North Western Transportation Company

Characteristics
- Design: through-truss swing span
- Total length: 2,735 feet (834 m)
- Longest span: 356 feet (109 m)

History
- Opened: 1871
- Closed: 1977

Location
- Interactive map of Winona Rail Bridge

Valley of the Mississippi from Winona, circa 1898

The Winona Rail Bridge was a swing bridge that spanned the Mississippi River between Winona, Minnesota, and Winona Junction in Buffalo, Buffalo County, Wisconsin. It was built to link the Winona and St. Peter Railroad with the La Crosse, Trempealeau & Prescott Railroad. Both railroads became part of the Chicago and North Western Transportation Company (C&NW). Parts of the bridge are still visible. The swing span was removed, but the box girder portion of the bridge still extends from Latsch Island just downstream of the current Main Channel Bridge. Piers from the original 1871 bridge and the box girders are in the North Channel just downstream of the current North Channel Bridge.

== History ==
=== Temporary bridge ===
On December 29, 1870, the Mississippi River was bridged by the first Winona Rail Bridge, a temporary bridge built in 4 days that connected with the La Crosse, Trempealeau & Prescott Railroad. The La Crosse, Trempealeau & Prescott, another enterprise of the C&NW, chartered to build from a point across the river from Winona to connect with the Chicago, Milwaukee and St. Paul Railroad at Winona Junction in Wisconsin near La Crosse. This connection allowed through railroad traffic from Chicago into Southern Minnesota, without having to ferry cars. It was the first train to cross the Mississippi above Dubuque, Iowa.

=== Swing bridge first day of operation incident ===
The permanent swing bridge was completed in May 1871. It partially collapsed when the bridge tender failed to secure the swing span on the first day of operation on May 26, 1871. The bridge was rebuilt and was reopened for traffic on January 16, 1872.

=== Milwaukee Road ===
The Chicago, Milwaukee and St. Paul Railroad would use this bridge to reach its track in Minnesota until the construction of the La Crosse Rail Bridge by 1876.

=== Replacements ===
The swing span was replaced in 1899. The entire bridge was reconstructed by C&NW in 1928, replacing the through-truss approach spans with plate girder spans.

=== Retirement ===
The bridge was no longer used by 1977 and the swing span was removed in 1980. The Winona Subdivision of the Union Pacific is reached by trackage rights over the La Crosse Rail Bridge.

== See also ==
- List of bridges documented by the Historic American Engineering Record in Minnesota
- List of bridges documented by the Historic American Engineering Record in Wisconsin
- List of crossings of the Upper Mississippi River
- Winona Green Bay and Western Rail Bridge (historical)
