= Minnesota Central Railway =

Overview
- Headquarters: St. Paul, Minnesota
- Locale: Midwestern United States
- Dates of operation: 1861–1867
- Successor: Chicago, Milwaukee and St. Paul Railway

Technical
- Track gauge: 4 ft 8 1/2 in (1,435 mm)

The Minnesota Central Railway was one of the first railroads in the state of Minnesota. The railroad originally incorporated as the Minnesota and Cedar Valley Railroad in 1856. Starting in 1864, the Minnesota Central laid tracks from Minneapolis across the Minnesota River to Mendota and then south toward Iowa. The goal was to link up with Iowa railroads that connected to Chicago and Milwaukee. It became part of the Chicago, Milwaukee and St. Paul Railway I & M Division. Portions of the line are still active, within the CPKC Owatonna Subdivision. Some other portions are industrial sidings serviced by Progressive Rail, Inc.

== History ==
1860 Minnesota Map

The 34th United States Congress passed a land grant act to the Territory of Minnesota for the purpose of constructing railroads on March 3, 1857. In response to the act, the Minnesota Territorial Assembly allocated lands for four rail projects in 1857, with the Minnesota and Cedar Valley railroad among them. The Minneapolis and Cedar Valley Railroad Company was authorized to build from "Minneapolis to a junction point near Mendota and thence via Faribault to the south line of Minnesota west of range 16." The other three railroads were:

- The Minnesota and Pacific (a predecessor of the Great Northern railroad, eventually to be the St. Paul and Pacific)
- Root River and Southern Minnesota (predecessor of the Chicago, Milwaukee and St. Paul Railway Southern Minnesota line), as well as the Minnesota Valley line (predecessor of the Omaha Road )
- The Transit Railroad, which was built as the Winona and St. Peter Railroad

In 1865, the "Central" crossed the Minnesota River from below Fort Snelling to Mendota on a swing bridge. In that same year, the Central tracks reached Faribault. During the 1866, the railroad completed tracks to Owatonna. At Owatonna, the Central made connection with the Winona and St. Peter (W & St P) railroad, which was building east-west across southern Minnesota, and had reached Owatonna by August 1864. The Central received subsidies of approximately $1.8 million in land grants, right of way with graded roadway, and state and local bonds to assist with the construction.

The McGregor Western Railway, meanwhile, built north from Iowa into Minnesota through Lyle, Austin, and Owatonna in 1867, connecting with the Central. The "McGregor" then acquired the Central in July of 1867. In September of 1867 the "McGregor" was acquired by the Milwaukee and St. Paul railroad. This line provided the first through route between the Twin Cities, Milwaukee, and Chicago, it was often referred to as the "Pioneer Route"
