= Winona and St. Peter Railroad Freight House =

- U.S. National Register of Historic Places
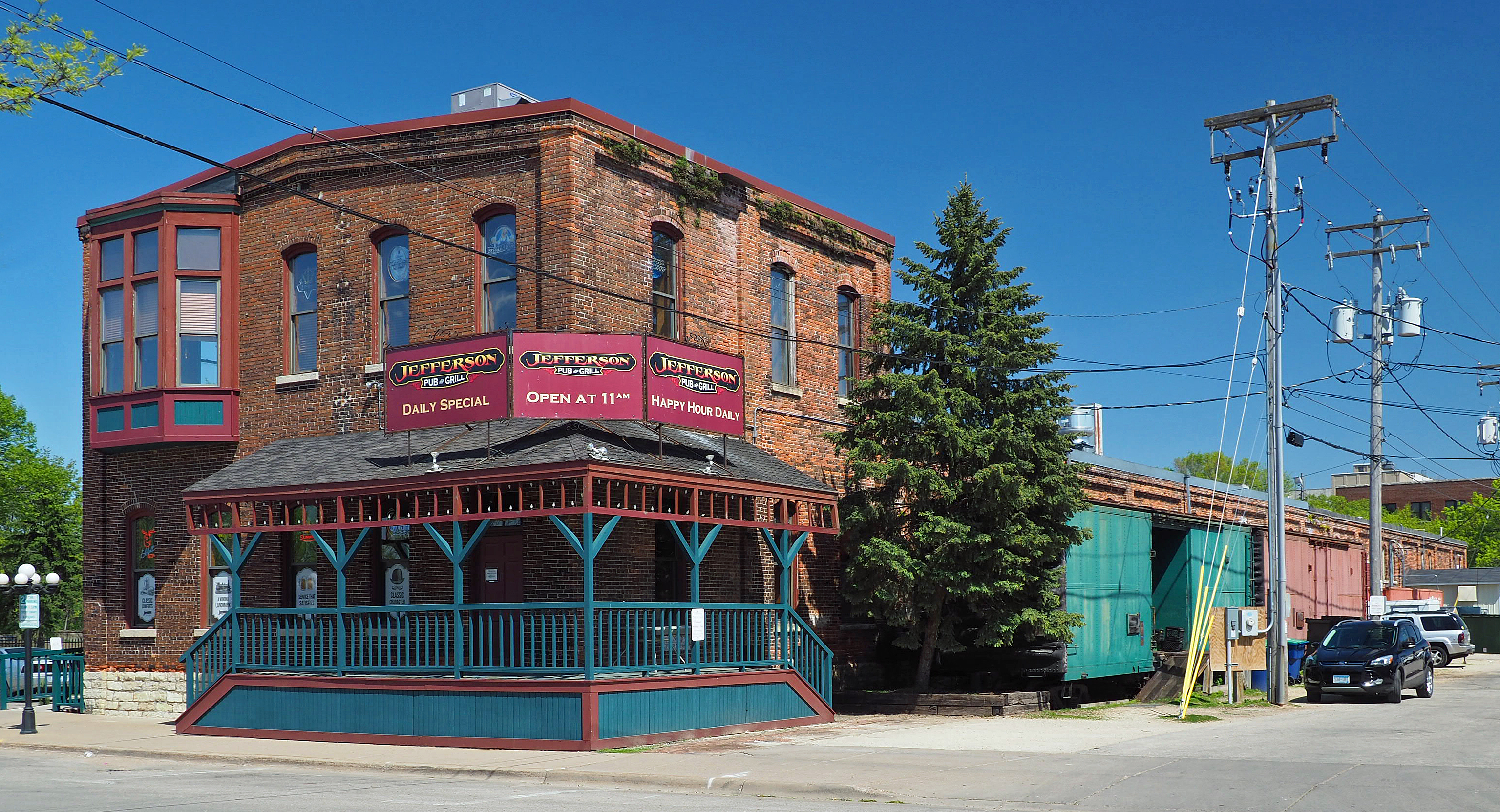
- The Winona and St. Peter Railroad Freight House viewed from the west

- Location within Minnesota Location within the United States
- Location: 58 Center Street, Winona, Minnesota
- Coordinates: 44°3′13.7″N 91°38′6″W
- Area: Less than one acre
- Built: 1882–83
- NRHP reference No.: 84001733
- Designated: January 26, 1984

The Winona and St. Peter Railroad Freight House is a former freight house in Winona, Minnesota, United States. Built from 1882 to 1883, it is the city's last surviving freight facility of the Winona and St. Peter Railroad. The building was listed on the National Register of Historic Places in 1984 for having local significance in the theme of transportation. It was nominated as a symbol of the Winona and St. Peter Railroad, which was instrumental in spurring Winona's industry and growth by developing markets along its rail lines across Minnesota and into Dakota Territory.

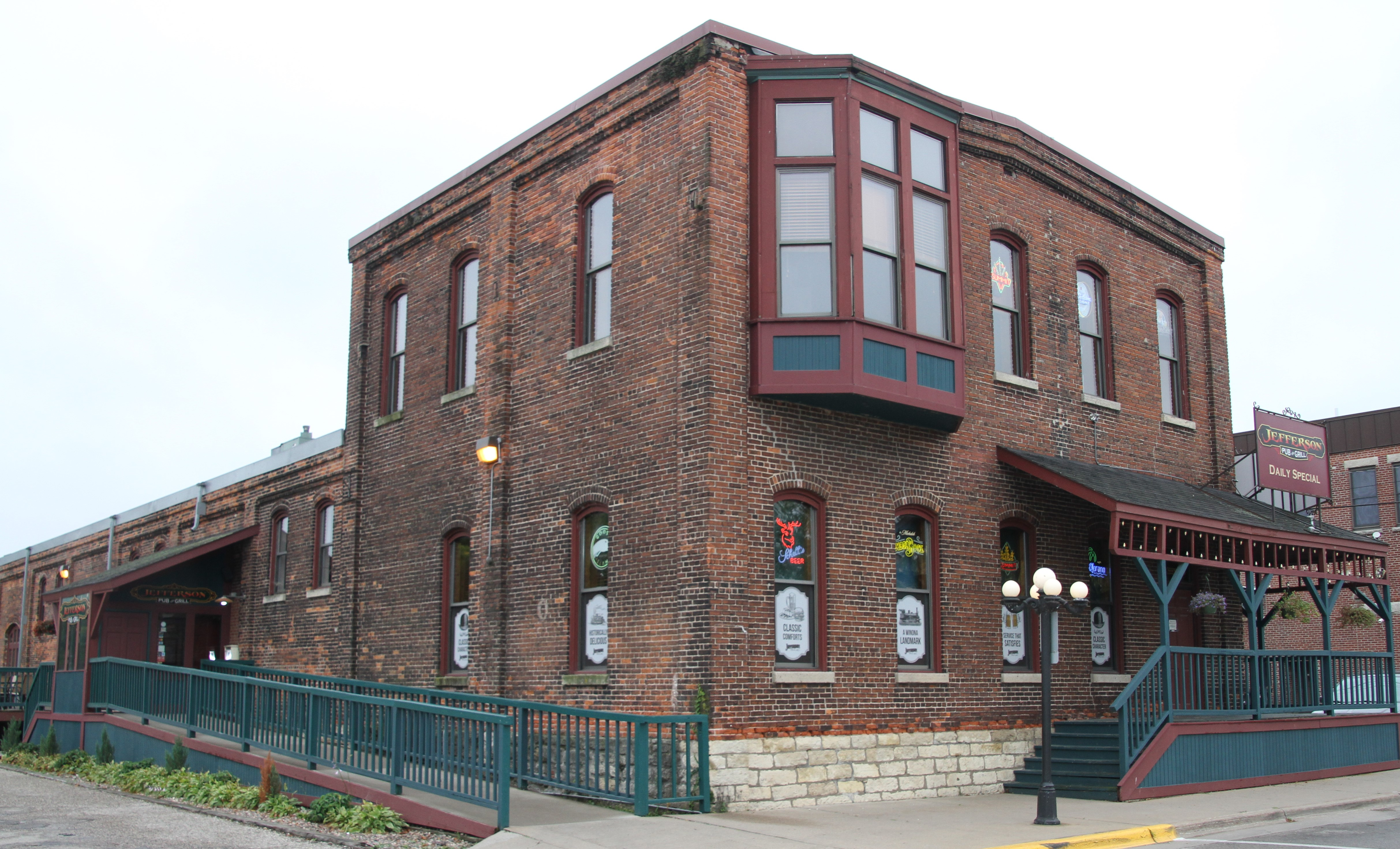
Jefferson Pub in 2017

Through mergers and acquisitions, the building continued to serve as a railroad office and freight house until 1961. As of 2017 the west end of the building houses the Jefferson Pub & Grill, which keeps vintage railroad photographs and memorabilia on display.

== See also ==
- National Register of Historic Places listings in Winona County, Minnesota
