= Owatonna Subdivision =

The Owatonna Subdivision or Owatonna Sub is a railway line in northern Iowa and southern Minnesota owned and operated by the Iowa, Chicago and Eastern Railroad (IC&E) subsidiary of Canadian Pacific. It extends about 124 miles (200 km) from Mason City, Iowa in the south to a junction at Comus north of Faribault, Minnesota. U.S. Highway 218 closely follows the rail line between Lyle, Minnesota and Owatonna.

Most of the line is dark territory, meaning that it is not signaled or equipped with centralized traffic control or automatic block signaling systems. The line is dispatched via radio using track warrant control.

This line had been under control of the Chicago, Milwaukee, St. Paul and Pacific Railroad (Milwaukee Road) for many years, then became part of the Soo Line Railroad and later Canadian Pacific. Canadian Pacific eventually sold off the line to I&M Rail Link in 1997, a company 67% owned by Washington Corporation (CP retained the remaining 33% ownership). Washington Corporation divested itself of I&M, so the Iowa, Chicago and Eastern was formed in 2002. The IC&E was owned by the Dakota, Minnesota and Eastern Railroad holding company Cedar American Railroad Holdings. In 2007, Canadian Pacific moved to purchase DM&E and its related companies, which was completed in 2008.

About four trains a day, carrying mostly agricultural products, operate on the line.
