= Coteau des Prairies =

Highland plateau in the north-central United States

Coordinates: 44.0000°N 96.3167°W

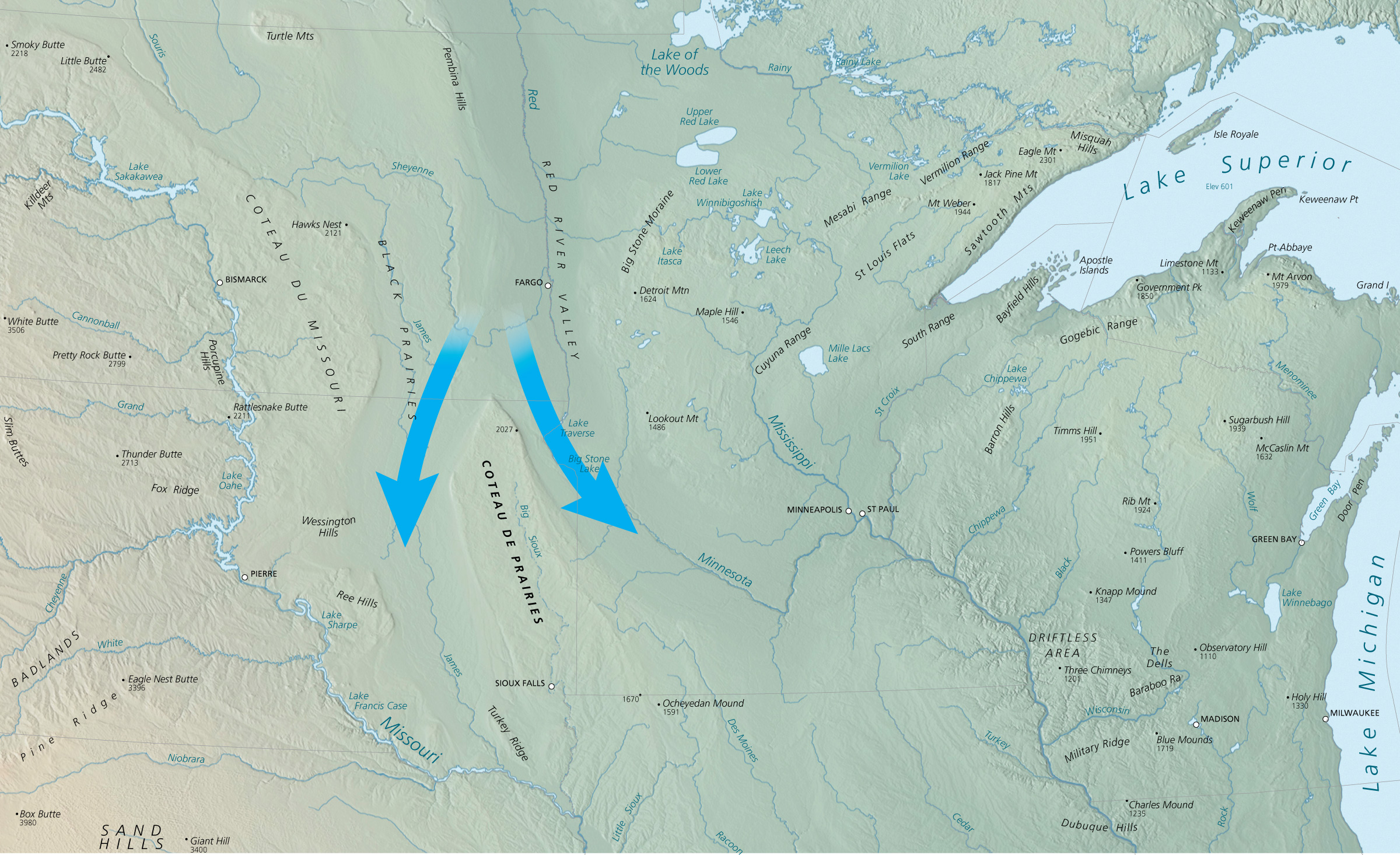
The Coteau des Prairies: blue arrows indicate paths of the two lobes of the glacier around either side of the formation.

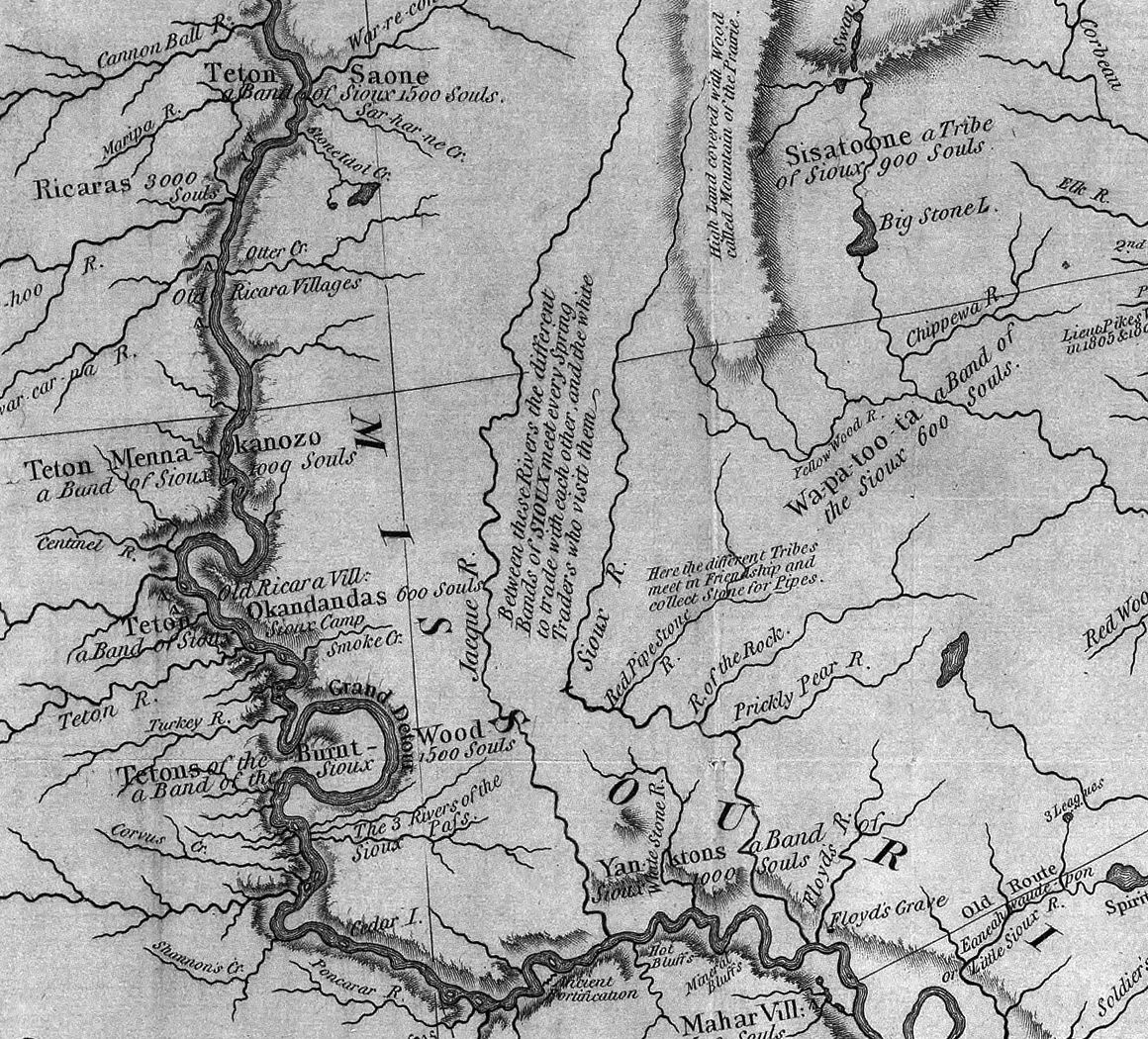
This excerpt from the Lewis and Clark map of 1814 shows the rivers of western Iowa and eastern South Dakota. The Coteau des Prairies is seen near the upper center of the map, "High land covered with wood called mountain of the prairie."

The Coteau des Prairies is a plateau approximately 200 miles in length and 100 miles in width (320 by 160 km), rising from the prairie flatlands in eastern South Dakota, southwestern Minnesota, and northwestern Iowa in the United States. The southeast portion of the Coteau comprises one of the distinct regions of Minnesota, known as Buffalo Ridge. The tip of the feature starts in extreme south North Dakota.

The flatiron-shaped plateau was named by early French explorers from New France (Quebec), coteau meaning "hill" in French; the general term coteau has since been used in English to describe any upland dividing ridge.

The plateau is composed of thick glacial deposits, the remnants of many repeated glaciations, reaching a composite thickness of approximately 900 feet (275 m). They are underlain by a small ridge of resistant Cretaceous shale. During the last (Pleistocene) Ice Age, two lobes of the Laurentide glacier, the James lobe on the west and the Des Moines lobe on the east, appear to have parted around the pre-existing plateau and further deepened the lowlands flanking the plateau.

The plateau has numerous small glacial lakes and is drained by the Big Sioux River in South Dakota and the Cottonwood River in Minnesota. Pipestone deposits on the plateau have been quarried for hundreds of years by Native Americans, who use the prized, brownish-red mineral to make their sacred ceremonial pipes. The quarries are located at Pipestone National Monument in the southwest corner of Minnesota and in adjacent Minnehaha County, South Dakota.

Numerous wind farms have been built on the area's surface to take advantage of the high average wind speeds.

== Photos from North Dakota ==
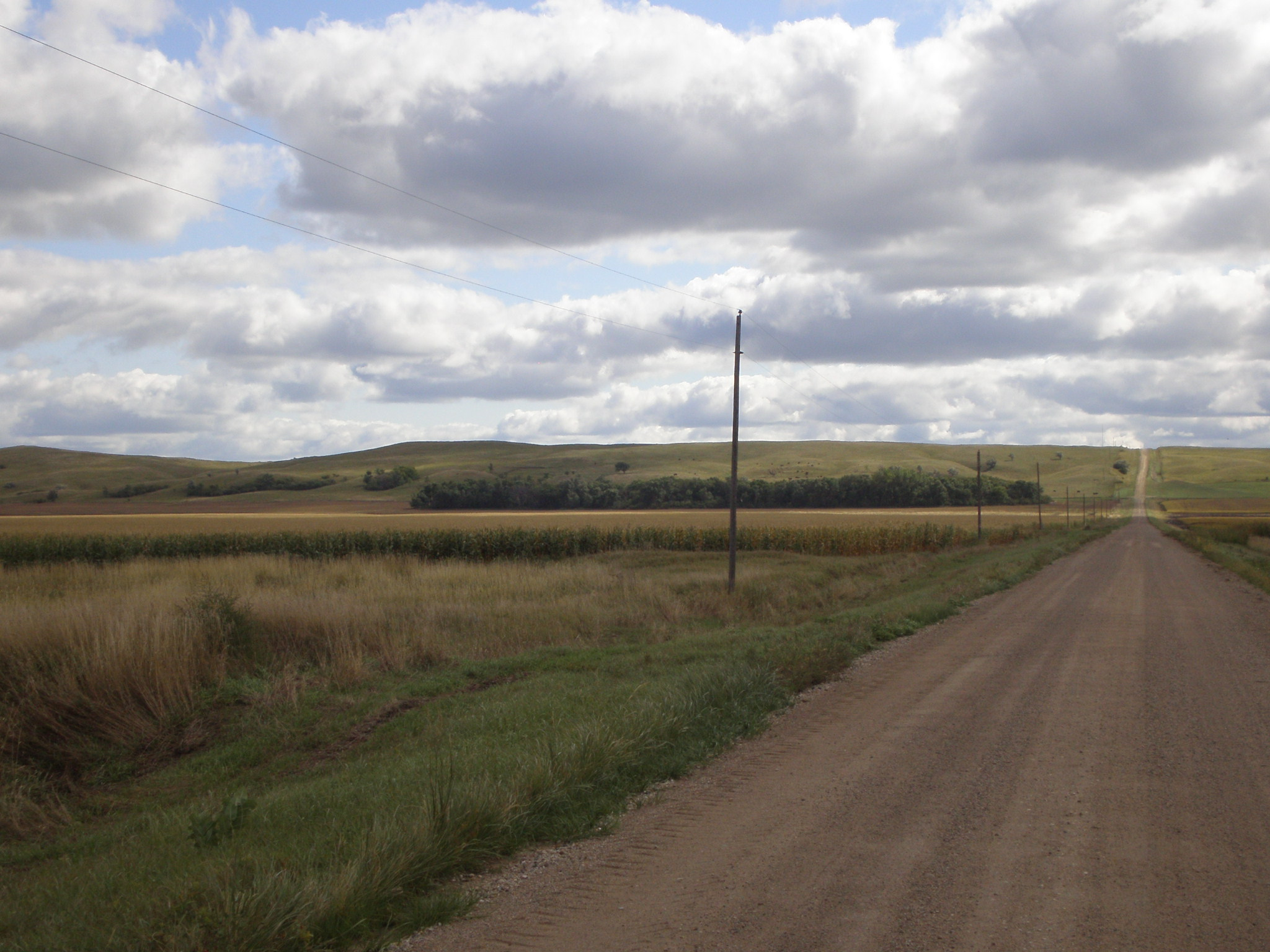
Northern tip of Coteau des Prairies, as seen from 139th Ave SE near Havana, ND

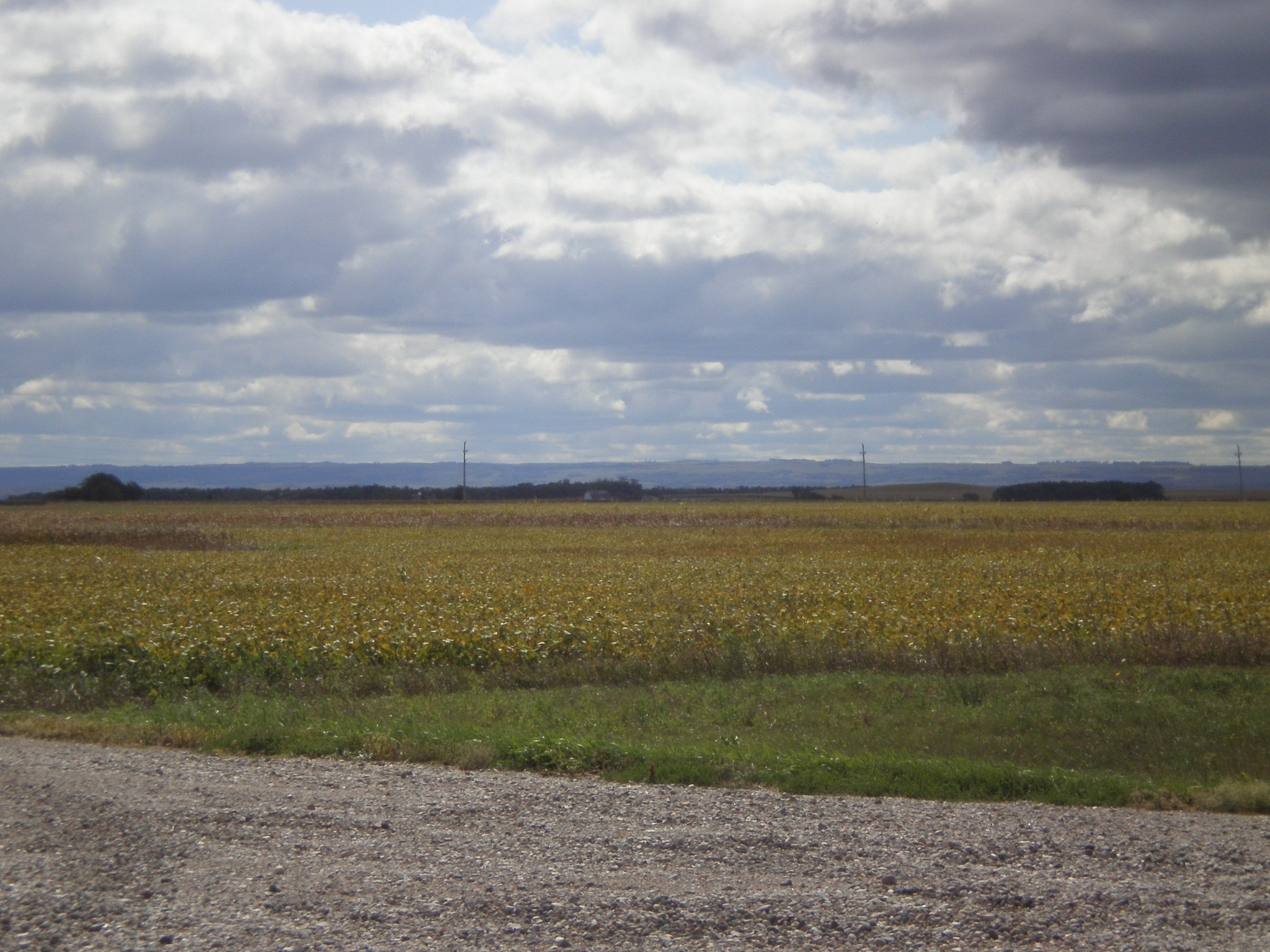
Coteau des Prairies as seen from the northeast, near Lidgerwood, ND

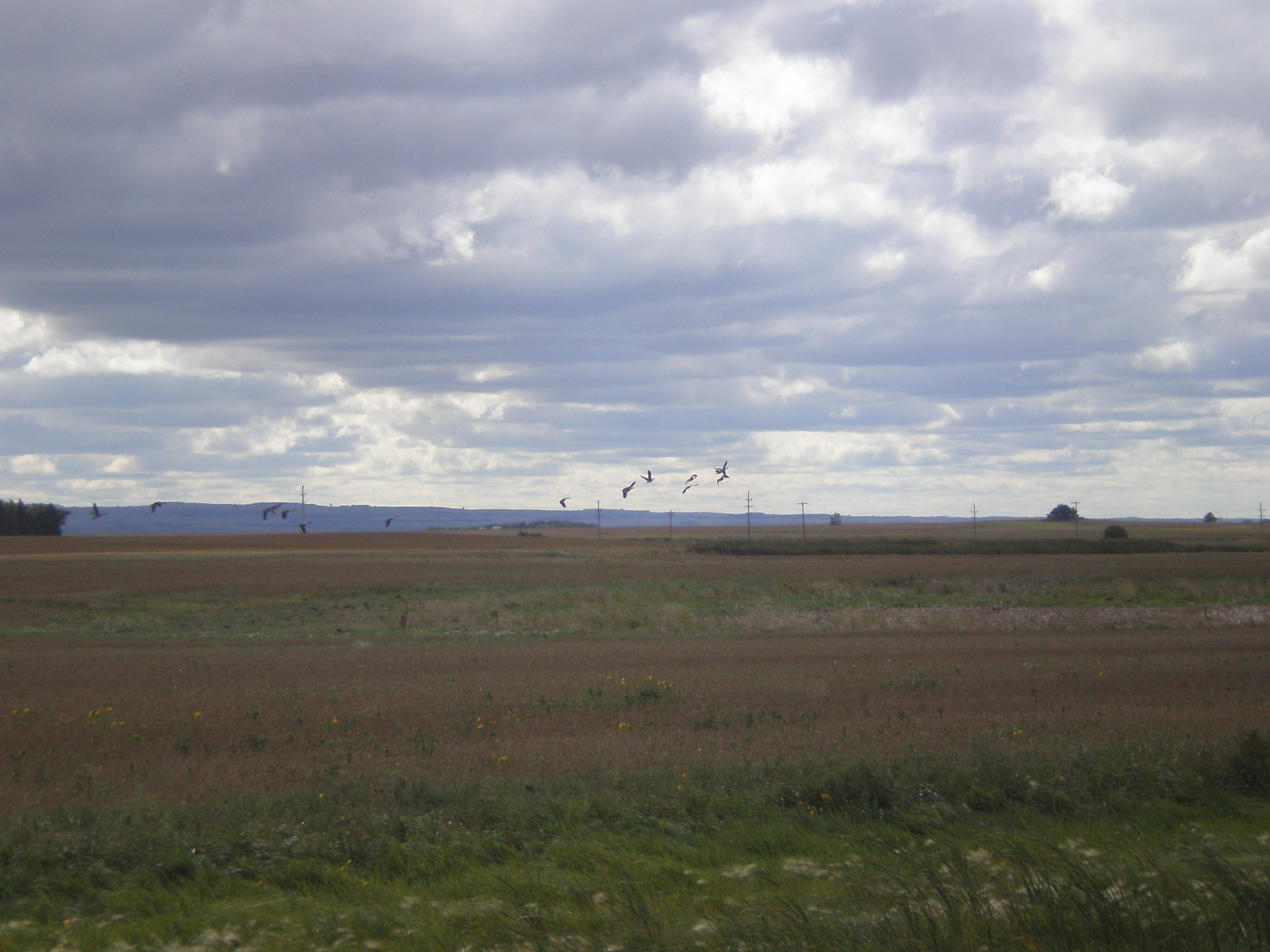
The northern head of the Coteau des Prairies, as seen from the Northeast near Lidgerwood, ND.
