= Winona and St. Peter Railroad =

Overview
- Headquarters: Winona, Minnesota
- Locale: Midwestern United States
- Dates of operation: 1861–1867
- Successor: Chicago and North Western Railway

Technical
- Track gauge: 4 ft 8 1/2 in (1,435 mm)
- Length: 319 miles

The Winona and St. Peter Railroad was a railroad in the Midwestern United States. It was founded in 1861 in Winona, Minnesota. The first 11 miles (18 km) from Winona to Stockton, Minnesota, were completed by the end of 1862, making it the second operational railroad in Minnesota, after the St. Paul and Pacific Line from Saint Paul to St. Anthony Falls.

Five years later its track reached Owatonna, Minnesota, connecting with the main line of the Minnesota Central Railway, predecessor of the Chicago, Milwaukee and St. Paul Railway I & M line between Saint Paul and Austin, Minnesota. In 1885 the railroad was involved in the Supreme Court case Winona & St. Peter Railroad Co. v. Barney. The language of the land grant extensions needed to be clarified as to where the two railroad land grants interfered at that junction in Owatonna.

The Chicago and North Western Transportation Company (C&NW) purchased the controlling interest in the Winona and St. Peter in 1867. The line would reach Watertown, South Dakota, with the financial backing of the C&NW. In 1900 it became the Minnesota Division of the C&NW.

== History ==
=== Organization of railroads in the Minnesota Territory ===
1860 Minnesota Map

The Transit Railroad Company was chartered March 3, 1855, by the Minnesota Territorial Assembly and was required to complete the railroad by March 3, 1867. The 34th United States Congress passed a land grant act to the Territory of Minnesota for the purpose of constructing railroads on March 3, 1857. In response to the act, the Minnesota Territorial Assembly allocated lands for four rail projects in 1857, with the Transit railroad among them. The route designed for the Transit Railroad by the 1857 legislative act was" from Winona, Minnesota, via St. Peter, Minnesota, to a feasible point on the Big Sioux River south of the 45th parallel north. It also included the route from that point to any point on the Missouri River south of same parallel. This act was passed at a special session called by Minnesota Territorial Governor Willis A. Gorman.

The other three railroads were:

- The Minnesota and Pacific (a predecessor of the Great Northern railroad, eventually to be the St. Paul and Pacific)
- Root River and Southern Minnesota (the predecessor of the Chicago, Milwaukee and St. Paul Railway Southern Minnesota line), as well as the Minnesota Valley line (predecessor of the Omaha Road )
- Minnesota and Cedar Valley (later the Minnesota Central Railway, the predecessor of the CStP&M line from Saint Paul to Austin)

The four railroads received land sections designated by odd numbers six miles (10 km) in width on the side of the roads and their branches. The Transit Railroad received $500,000 in bonds (equivalent to $17,276,786 in 2025). It was unable to complete the venture of selling stock to start work. The financial Panic of 1857 saw railroad stock values peak and credit dry up. The Transit company forfeited its property to the newly formed State of Minnesota in 1860. The Transit Railroad Company was sold on June 23, 1860, and reorganized as the Winona and St. Peter Railroad Company. It was founded with a capital of $5,000,000 (equivalent to $115,178,571 in 2025) as a loan from the territory. Little construction was accomplished until after end of the American Civil War.

=== Operating by 1862 ===
The St. Paul and Pacific line, which had received the old Minnesota and Pacific charter, completed its line from Saint Paul to St. Anthony in 1862. The Winona & St Peter Railroad Company was organized March 10, 1862, and completed its line from Winona to Rochester, Minnesota, in 1864. In August it reached Owatonna.

=== Chicago and Northwestern investment ===
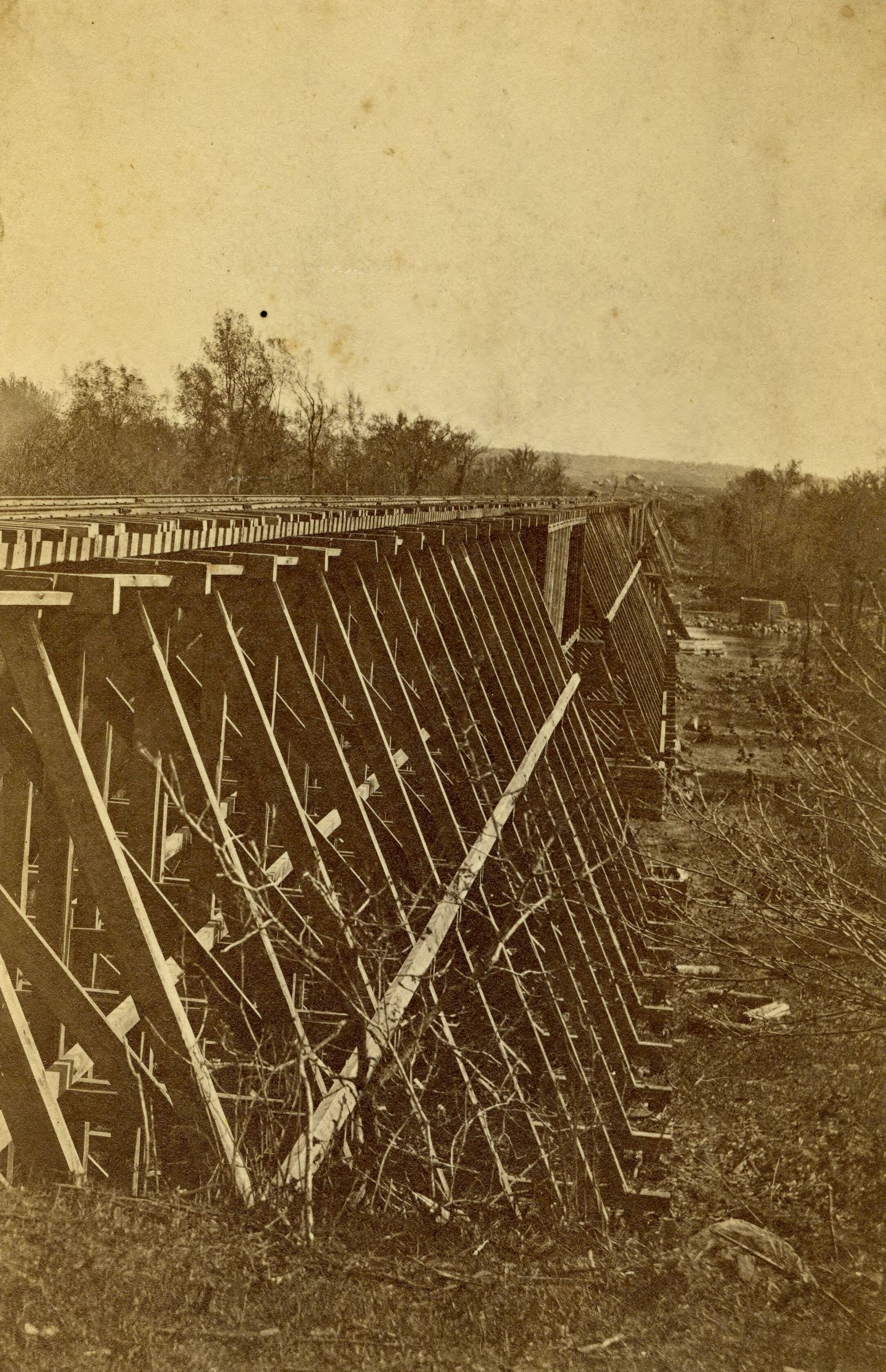
Winona and St. Peter Railroad Bridge, St. Peter, Minnesota, c.1878.

In 1867 the Chicago and Northwestern Railway Company purchased the controlling shares in the Winona and St Peter. Further railroad milestones were: Janesville, Minnesota, in 1870, St. Peter in 1871, New Ulm (via Nicollet and Courtland) in 1872, and the western boundary of the state in 1874. The Winona Mankato and New Ulm Railroad Company was organized in 1870 and a railroad was built from New Ulm to Mankato and afterwards acquired by the Winona and St Peter.

In December 1870, the Mississippi River was bridged by the Winona Rail Bridge, a temporary span that connected with the La Crosse, Trempealeau & Prescott Railroad. The La Crosse, Trempealeau & Prescott, another enterprise of the C&NW, chartered to build from a point across the river from Winona to connect with the Chicago, Milwaukee and St. Paul railroad at Winona Junction in Wisconsin near La Crosse. This connection allowed through railroad traffic from Chicago into Southern Minnesota, without having to ferry cars. The swing span for the bridge was opened in May 1871.

=== Completion of planned route ===
The Winona and St. Peter also continued to lay tracks across southern Minnesota and into Dakota Territory. The line turned northwest at Tracy, continued into Dakota Territory, and reached Lake Kampeska and Watertown, South Dakota in 1873. The Long Depression starting in 1873 did not bankrupt the C&NW nor the W&StP. Towns established along these tracks provided a ready market for goods manufactured in Winona and channeled agricultural products into the city, spurring Winona's growth as an industrial and shipping hub from 1870 to 1900 and making it the third largest city in Minnesota for three decades. The completion of the Baraboo Air Line Railroad between Madison and Winona Junction meant that the C&NW had a through route from Chicago to South Dakota on home rails.

== Legacy ==
The portion of the rail line from Winona to Tracy still is in use in the 21st century. That route is the Dakota, Minnesota and Eastern Railroad (DM&E) subsidiary of the Canadian Pacific Railway.

Three surviving buildings associated with the railroad are listed on the National Register of Historic Places:

- Winona and St. Peter Railroad Freight House, built in Winona 1882–1883
- Winona and St. Peter Freight Depot, built in Sleepy Eye, Minnesota, circa 1887
- Winona and St. Peter Engine House, built in Winona circa 1890.

== See also ==
- Waseca Subdivision - the active segment from Winona to Waseca
- Tracy Subdivision - the active segment from Waseca to Tracy
- Winona Subdivision - the first 1.8 mile portion of the Winona and St. Peter operated by Union Pacific in the Winona Terminal area
