= Buffalo Ridge =

Range of hills in Minnesota, US

Coordinates: 43.9802442°N 96.0105766°W

Buffalo Ridge is a large expanse of rolling hills in the southeastern part of the larger Coteau des Prairies. It stands 1,995 feet (608 m) above sea level. The Buffalo Ridge is sixty miles (97 km) long and runs through Lincoln, Pipestone, Murray, Nobles, and Rock counties in the southwest corner of Minnesota, and Minnehaha, Moody, and Lincoln counties in southeast South Dakota.

Because of its altitude and high average wind speed, Buffalo Ridge has been transformed into a place for creating renewable energy. As of May 2022, over 1,000 wind turbines stand in the Buffalo Ridge area, the oldest of which was built in 1984 and consists of 16 Kenetech kvs 33 turbines.

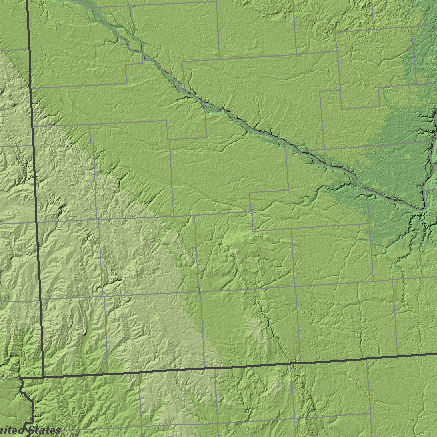
Buffalo Ridge is located within the Minnesota portion of the Coteau des Prairies, a highland represented by the light areas in this shaded relief image of southwestern Minnesota.

High portion of the Buffalo Ridge can be seen on this Nobles County map from an 1882 Geological Report.

== Geology ==
Buffalo Ridge is on a drainage divide separating the watersheds of the Mississippi and Missouri Rivers.

Buffalo Ridge is part of the inner coteau and is the highest point of the Coteau des Prairies in Minnesota. Its bedrock is formed of Cretaceous shale, sandstone and clay that lie above the pinkish-red Upper Precambrian Sioux Quartzite. These units are covered in most areas by thick deposits of glacial drift, which consist of up to 800 feet (244 m) of pre-Wisconsin age glacial till (generally considered Kansas drift) left after the glaciers receded. The inner coteau is made up of extremely stream-eroded glacial deposits of pre-Wisconsin glacial drift, which is then covered by a 6 to 15 foot (1.8 to 4.6 m) thick deposit of a wind-blown silt called loess.

This covering results in the creation of an area with long, gently sloping hills. Loess is an easily eroded material, and because of this there are few lakes and wetlands in the inner coteau area. Loess promotes well-established dendritic drainage networks, the majority of which flow into the Missouri River and Minnesota River systems.

Loamy, well-drained soils like Mollisols-Aquolls and Udolls containing Borolls and Ustolls dominate the soils of the inner coteau. On the areas of eroded glacial deposits, dry prairie and moist prairie soils like Cummins and Grigal are present. These soil types, along with the temperate climate, combine to make perfect growing conditions for tallgrass prairie, which once covered almost the entire inner coteau.

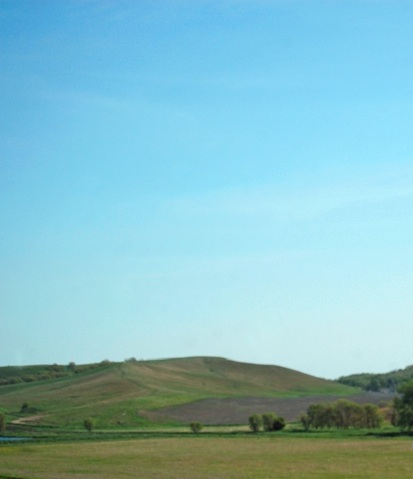
Buffalo Ridge

== Climate ==
Buffalo Ridge has a midlatitude continental climate with an average 24 to 27 inches (61 to 69 cm) of precipitation per year and 36 to 40 inches (91 to 101 cm) of snowfall per winter. The average spring thaw is around April 5 and the spring green-up generally occurs between May 1 and May 10. Peak fall colors usually occur around October 20 and there are generally 40 to 50 thunderstorm days per year.

=== Chandler–Lake Wilson, Minnesota F5 tornado of 1992 ===
On June 16, intense storms struck Eastern South Dakota and Southwestern Minnesota, destroying over one hundred homes and businesses. These supercells spawned several large and intense tornadoes. An F0 tornado formed in Charles Mix County, South Dakota and moved toward Mitchell. An F2 tornado formed in Miner County, South Dakota, and an F3 tornado formed southwest of Oldham, both causing considerable property damage. The worst tornado formed near the unincorporated town of Leota in Southwestern Minnesota, which quickly became a massive, 0.75 miles (1.21 km) wide storm that stayed on the ground for almost an hour and a half, doing substantial damage to the cities of Chandler and Lake Wilson.

In Chandler, the property damage was estimated at over $15 million. This tornado was given the maximum rating of F5 on the Fujita Scale, making it the only F5 tornado documented in the United States in 1992. Another tornado formed in South Dakota later in the day, striking Colton and Dell Rapids before moving into Minnesota, where it struck the town of Chandler for the second time.

== Geography ==
Before the settlers arrived and developed the towns on and surrounding Buffalo Ridge, the Dakota Native Americans inhabited the area. They, and other tribes before them, created intricate pipes out of the claystone called "Catlinite" in the Buffalo Ridge area, which are displayed at Pipestone National Monument. Native Americans from around the country still quarry this stone for pipe-making today.

Most of the land on Buffalo Ridge is privately owned farmland.

=== Hole in the Mountain Prairie ===
Hole in the Mountain Prairie is a nature reserve created by The Nature Conservancy to preserve the diminishing tallgrass prairie and the insects and animals native to tallgrass prairies. It is on the outer edge of Buffalo Ridge and is the headwaters of Flandreau Creek. In the past the area had been used as a grazing area for cattle and sheep, the result being the near-extinction of the tallgrass prairie. Today the Nature Conservancy manages the Hole in the Mountain with controlled burning which have led to a remarkable recovery of the native prairie vegetation.

== Wind farms ==
A number of wind farms are sited on the ridge. Among them are Nobles Wind Farm, Buffalo Ridge Wind Farm, and Fenton Wind Farm.

== See also ==
- List of large wind farms
- Wind power in the United States

== Works cited ==
- "Buffalo Ridge Wind Towers". Hendricks, Minnesota. 2004. Archived from the original on April 16, 2007..
- Dieter, Charles; Higgins, Kenneth; Osbourn, Robert; Usgaard, Richard (January 1998). "Bird Flight Characteristics Near Wind Turbines in Minnesota". The American Midland Naturalist. 139: 29–38. doi:10.1674/0003-0031(1998)139[0029:BFCNWT]2.0.CO;2. S2CID 86144416.
- Douglas, Paul (1990). Prairie Skies: The Minnesota Weather Book. Voyageur Press Inc.
- Northern Prairie Wildlife Research Center (August 3, 2006). "Regional Landscape Ecosystems of Michigan, Minnesota and Wisconsin". USGS. Archived from the original on September 29, 2006.
- Peterson, Dean; Richter, Gary (1994). Buffalo Ridge Tornado June 16, 1992. Walsworth Publ.
- The City of Lake Benton, Minnesota. "Wind Power on the Buffalo Ridge".
