= Ash Lake =

Ash Lake may refer to:

== Cities, towns, townships etc. ==
- Ash Lake Township, Lincoln County, Minnesota

== Lakes ==
- Ash Lake (Lincoln County, Minnesota)
- Ash Lake (Hubley), a lake in the Halifax Regional Municipality, Nova Scotia
- Ash Lake (Clare), a lake of Clare municipality, Nova Scotia
- Ash Lake (New Chester), a lake of Guysborough District, Nova Scotia
- Ash Lake (St. Mary's), a lake of Guysborough District, Nova Scotia
- Ash Lake (Timberlea), a lake in the Halifax Regional Municipality, Nova Scotia
- Ash Lake (Upper Tantallon), a lake in the Halifax Regional Municipality, Nova Scotia
- Ash Lake (Vancouver Island), a lake on Vancouver Island, British Columbia
- Ash Lake (Wellington), a lake in the Halifax Regional Municipality, Nova Scotia
