= Lake Stay =

Lake Stay may refer to:

== Cities, towns, townships etc. ==
- Lake Stay Township, a township Lincoln County, Minnesota

== Lakes ==
- Lake Stay (Minnesota), a lake in Lincoln County, Minnesota
