= Marshfield Township =

Marshfield Township may refer to the following townships in the United States:

- Marshfield Township, Lincoln County, Minnesota
- Marshfield Township, Webster County, Missouri, in Webster County, Missouri
- Marshfield (township), Wood County, Wisconsin
