= Yellow Medicine River =

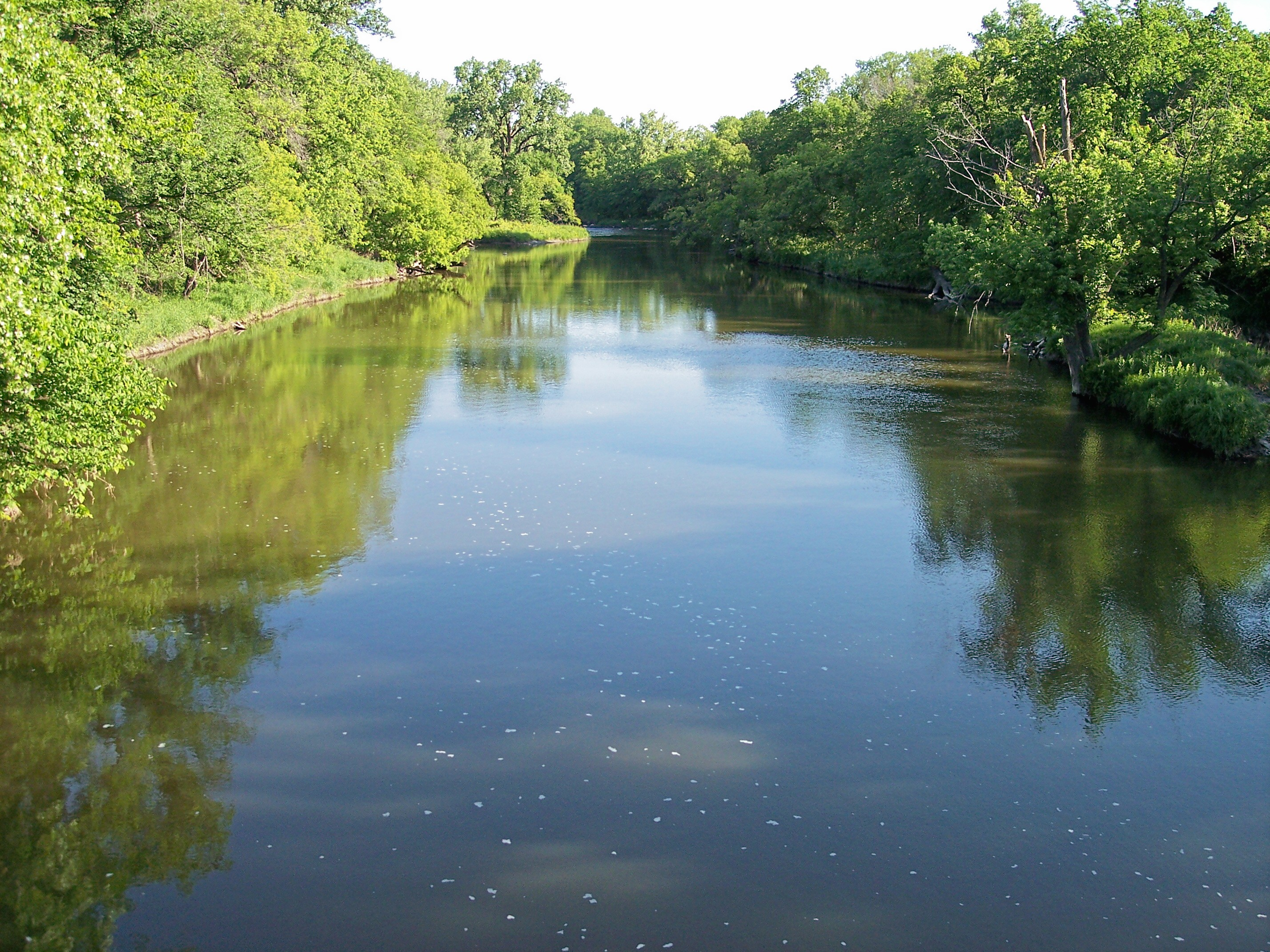
- The Yellow Medicine River in Minnesota Falls Township in 2007

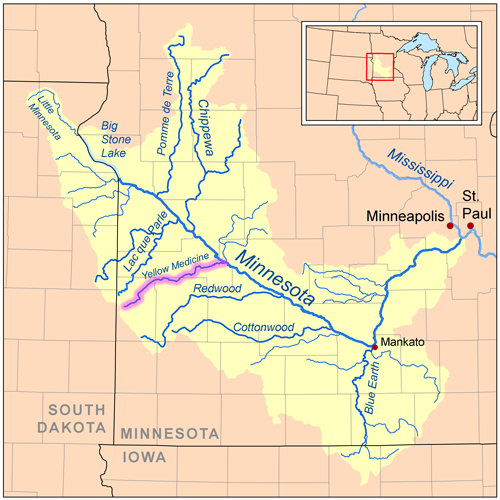

Location
- Country: United States
- State: Minnesota

Physical characteristics
- Source: Lake Shaokatan
  - location: Shaokatan Township, Lincoln County
  - coordinates: 44°24′41″N 96°21′05″W
  - elevation: 1,776 ft (541 m)
- Mouth: Minnesota River
  - location: Upper Sioux Agency State Park, Yellow Medicine County
  - coordinates: 44°44′21″N 95°25′43″W
  - elevation: 869 ft (265 m)
- Length: 107.2 mi (172.5 km)
- Basin size: 665 sq mi (1,720 km^{2})
- Discharge
  - location: near Granite Falls
  - average: 142 cu ft/s (4.0 m^{3}/s)
  - minimum: 0 cu ft/s (0 m^{3}/s)
  - maximum: 17,200 cu ft/s (490 m^{3}/s)

Basin features
- Tributaries
  - left: North Branch Yellow Medicine River, Spring Creek
  - right: South Branch Yellow Medicine River

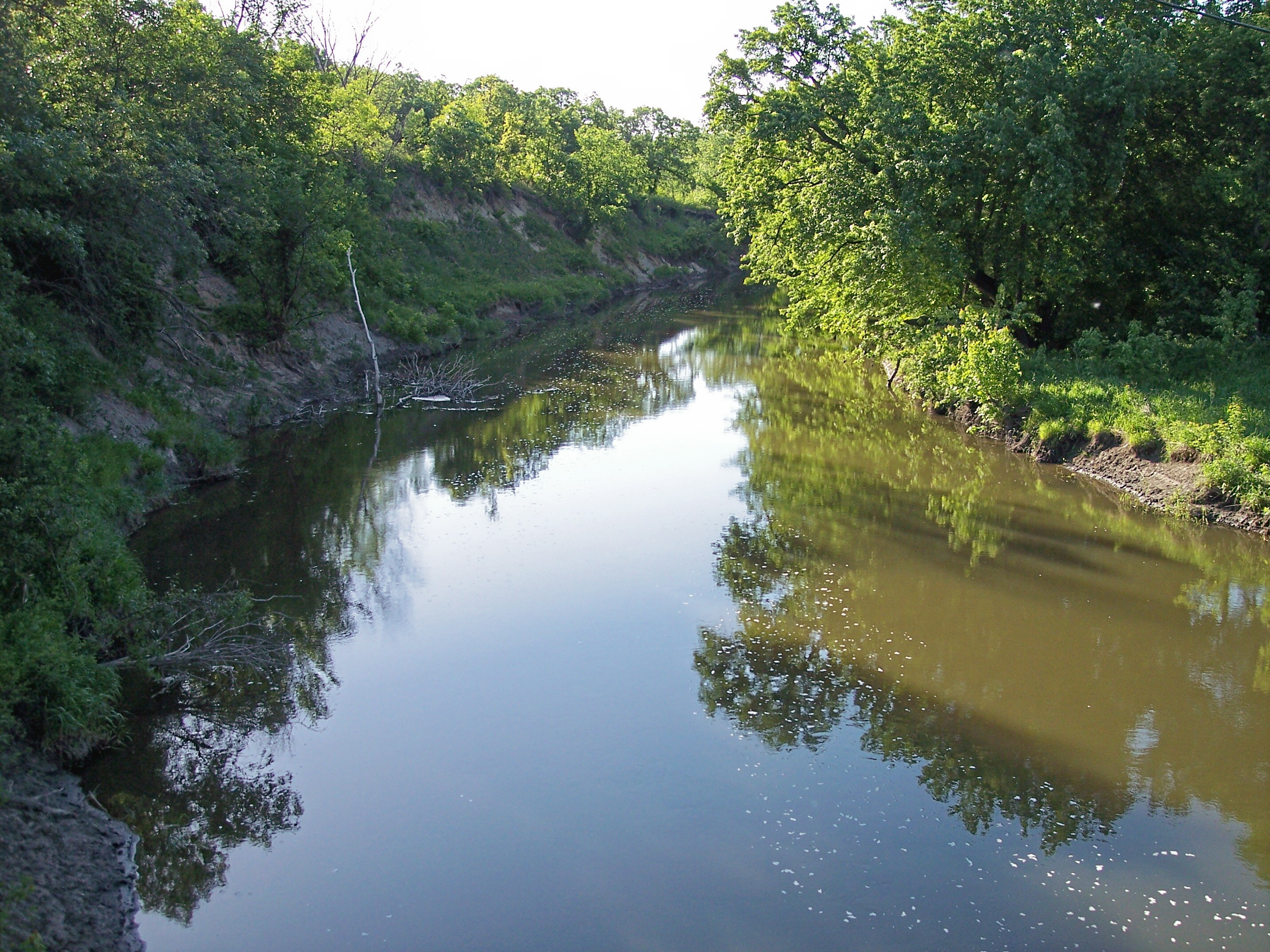
The Yellow Medicine River in Wood Lake Township in 2007

The Yellow Medicine River is a tributary of the Minnesota River, 107 miles (172 km) long, in southwestern Minnesota in the United States. Via the Minnesota River, it is part of the watershed of the Mississippi River, draining an area of 665 square miles (1,720 km^{2}) in an agricultural region.

The Yellow Medicine River issues from Lake Shaokatan in Shaokatan Township in western Lincoln County, approximately six miles (9.7 km) southwest of Ivanhoe, on the Coteau des Prairies, a morainic plateau dividing the Mississippi and Missouri River watersheds. It flows initially northeastwardly as an intermittent stream, past Ivanhoe. The stream flows off the Coteau in northeastern Lincoln County, dropping 250 feet (76 m) in five miles (8.0 km), and turns east-northeastwardly, following a generally treeless course on till plains through northern Lyon County and eastern Yellow Medicine County, past Hanley Falls. It flows into the Minnesota River in Upper Sioux Agency State Park in Sioux Agency Township, approximately eight miles (13 km) southeast of Granite Falls, after dropping 85 feet (26 m) in its final ten miles (16 km) in the Minnesota River valley.

The Yellow Medicine River's largest tributaries are the North Branch Yellow Medicine River and the South Branch Yellow Medicine River, both of which flow for most of their lengths on the Coteau. The North Branch, 41 miles (66 km) long, flows northeastwardly through northern Lincoln County, briefly entering Yellow Medicine County and passing through Porter. The South Branch, 62 miles (100 km) long, flows northeastwardly through Lincoln County into northwestern Lyon County, past Minneota. Other tributaries of the Yellow Medicine include Spring Creek, 46 miles (74 km) long, which flows eastwardly through Yellow Medicine County; and Mud Creek, 31 miles (50 km) long, which flows eastwardly through western Yellow Medicine County into northwestern Lyon County.

The Minnesota Pollution Control Agency statistically combines the watershed of the Yellow Medicine River with that of Hawk Creek on the opposite bank of the Minnesota River, as well as small watersheds of nearby Minnesota River tributaries. According to the agency, 81% of the land in the Yellow Medicine-Hawk Creek watersheds is used for agriculture, with corn and soybeans being the predominant crops.

In May 2008, 19 year-old Brandon Swanson went missing from Porter, Minnesota. It was and still is highly theorized that Brandon may have slipped and fallen into the river. However, even after an extensive search, nothing has been found.

== Flow rate ==
At the United States Geological Survey's stream gauge near Granite Falls, 6 miles (9.7 km) upstream from the river's mouth, the annual mean flow of the river between 1931 and 2005 was 142 cubic feet per second (4 m^{3}/s). The highest recorded flow during the period was 17,200 ft^{3}/s (487 m^{3}/s) on April 10, 1969. Readings of zero were recorded on numerous days during several years.

== See also ==
- List of rivers in Minnesota
- List of Minnesota placenames of Native American origin
