= Verdin (disambiguation) =

Verdin is a species of penduline tit.

Verdin may also refer to:

- The Verdin Company, American bell foundry
- USS Verdin (AMS-38), American minesweeper
- USS Verdin (ASR-17), American submarine rescue ship
- Verdin baronets, extinct baronetcy
- Verdin High School, former UK secondary school
- Verdin, Iran (disambiguation), places in Iran

== People ==
- Sir Joseph Verdin, 1st Baronet, JP, DL (1838–1920), British salt industrialist and philanthropist
- Robert Verdin (1836–1887), British salt industrialist, politician and philanthropist
- Francisco Verdín y Molina (died 1675), Roman Catholic Bishop of Michoacán and later Bishop of Guadalajara
- Carlos Torres-Verdin, academic
- Clarence Verdin (born 1963), American football player
- Danny Verdin (born 1964), American politician
- Jaime Verdín Saldaña (born 1962), Mexican politician affiliated with the National Action Party
- Julia Verdin, British independent film producer and founder of Rough Diamond Productions
- Letitia H. Verdin, (born 1970) American state court judge from South Carolina

== See also ==
- Verdi (disambiguation)
