= Wilno, Minnesota =

Unincorporated community in Minnesota, United States

- Unincorporated community
- Location within Minnesota Location within the United States
- Coordinates: 44°29′59″N 96°13′53″W
- Country: United States
- State: Minnesota
- County: Lincoln
- Township: Royal
- Elevation: 1,677 ft (511 m)
- Time zone: UTC-6 (Central (CST))
  - Summer (DST): UTC-5 (CDT)
- ZIP code: 56142
- Area code: 507
- GNIS feature ID: 654217

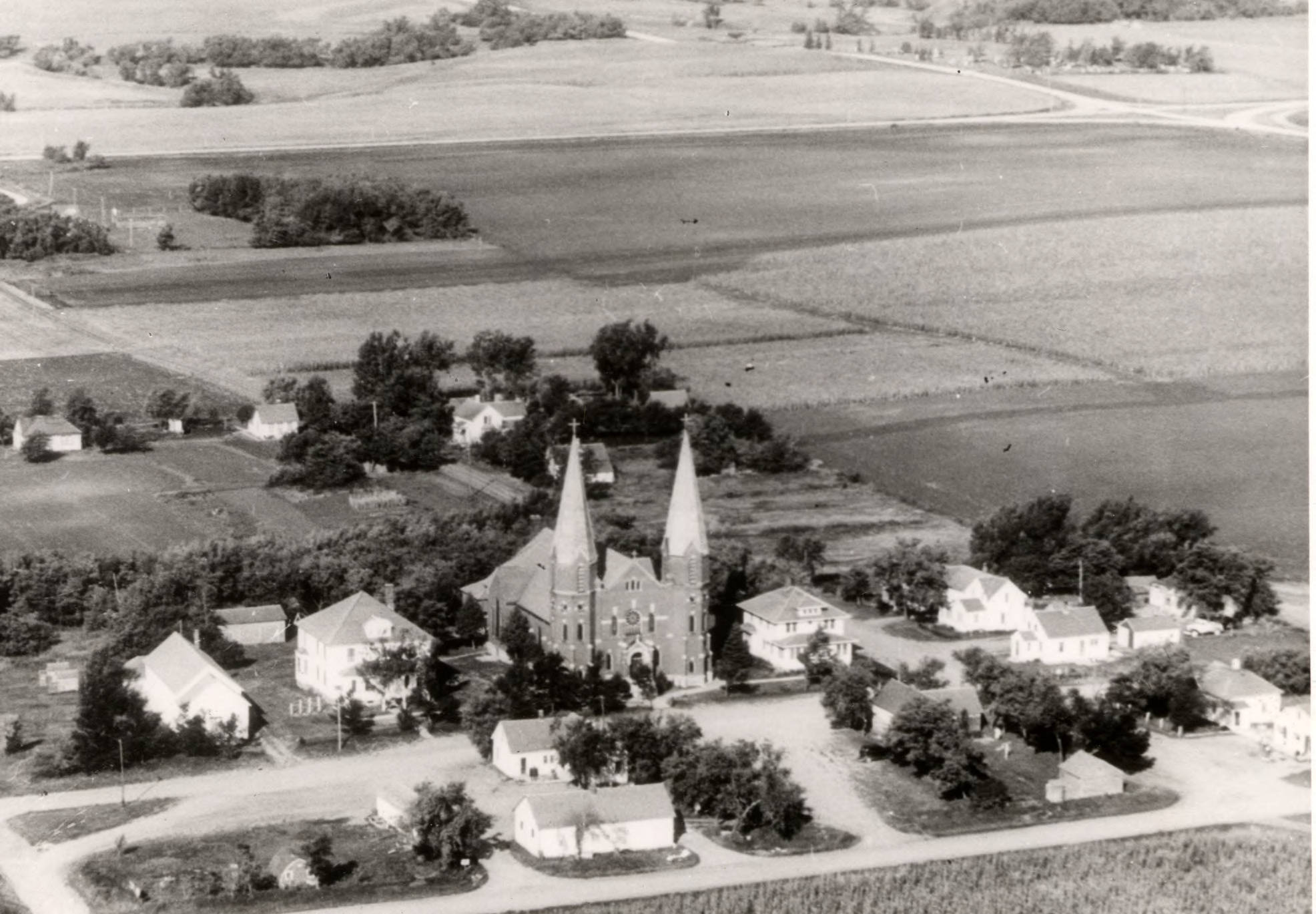
An aerial view of Wilno, Minnesota. St. John Cantius Church is in the center of the photograph, and has the two tall spires that existed prior to their shortening in the early 1950s. Photo from the St. John Cantius Roman Catholic Church records, Immigration History Research Center Archives, University of Minnesota Libraries.

Wilno is an unincorporated community located in Royal Township, Lincoln County, Minnesota, United States.

== History ==
Wilno was laid out in 1883 on land provided by the Chicago and Northwestern railroad to create a Polish settlement. The community was formed as part of a planned effort between the railroad and leaders of Polish National Alliance (PNA) with the cooperation of the Catholic Church. The organizers named the town after Vilnius by taking its Polish name Wilno. St. John Cantius Church was established in the town in the same year. Rev. R. Byzewski of Winona born in Kashubia and Bishop John Ireland of St. Paul also worked to establish the church.

By 1891, the town was centered on the Polish Catholic parish and school. It also had a post office, carpenter, blacksmithy, general store, saloon, and wagonmaker. The town postmaster also operated a small reading room.

A common myth is that when the railroad attempted to buy land for right-of-way, two Wilno farmers refused the amount offered. So the railroad was built through what became the town of Ivanhoe instead. In fact the railroads frequently bypassed small "inland" towns like Wilno. The town remained a tiny Catholic settlement.

The centennial for the church was celebrated in 1983. At that time Wilno consisted of the church, two stores, and 10 households.

== See also ==
John Cantius - church's namesake.
