= Lake Benton =

Lake Benton or Benton Lake may refer to a place in the United States:

== Cities, towns, and townships ==
- Lake Benton, Minnesota, a small city in Lincoln County
- Lake Benton Township, Lincoln County, Minnesota

== Lakes ==
- Lake Benton (Lincoln County, Minnesota)
- Lake Benton, the official first name of the Lake of the Ozarks
- Benton Lake, Montana, a lake within Benton Lake National Wildlife Refuge
- Benton Lake, Minnesota, a lake within Carver County, Minnesota
