= Wendell Erickson =

American politician

Wendell O. Erickson

Member of the Minnesota House of Representatives from the 19B, 26B, 27B district
- In office January 5, 1965 – January 5, 1987
- Preceded by: Roy Cummings
- Succeeded by: Andy Steensma

Personal details
- Born: June 17, 1925 Stanchfield, Minnesota, U.S.
- Died: August 8, 2018 (aged 93) Sioux Falls, South Dakota, U.S.
- Party: Republican Party of Minnesota, U.S.
- Spouse: Kathryn
- Children: 5
- Education: University of Minnesota
- Occupation: Educator, politician, veteran

Wendell Oliver Erickson (June 17, 1925 – August 8, 2018) was an American politician who was a member of the Minnesota House of Representatives from southwestern Minnesota.

== Service in the Minnesota House ==
First elected in 1964, Erickson was re-elected every two years until 1986. A Republican, he represented the old Districts 19B and 26B and, later, 27B, which included all or portions of Lincoln, Lyon, Murray, Nobles, Pipestone and Rock counties, changing somewhat through redistricting in 1970 and 1980.

While in the legislature, Erickson earned a reputation as a leader on issues relevant to education and agriculture. He allied with the Conservative Caucus at a time when the legislature was still officially nonpartisan, and later identified as a Republican when party affiliation became required of candidates.

Erickson served on the House Agriculture, Appropriations, Budget, Commerce, Education & Higher Education, Environmental Preservation, Judiciary, Labor Relations, Rules & Legislative Administration and Transportation committees, and on various other committee incarnations and subcommittees during his 22 years in office. He was chair of the House Education Committee during his final term in office, having also served previously as chair of the House Appropriations Subcommittee on Education in 1979.

Erickson was, along with senators Dennis Frederickson, Earl Renneke and Jim Vickerman, and representatives Aubrey Dirlam, Henry Kalis and Gilbert Esau, one of the longest-serving legislators from southern Minnesota in the state's history. He was unseated by Andy Steensma in the wave of Democratic victories that swept southwestern Minnesota in the DFL Party's "Firestorm" of 1986.

== State appointment and Extension Service award ==
In 1968, Erickson was appointed to the Minnesota Education Council by Governor Harold LeVander, serving for several years. In 1981, he was awarded the University of Minnesota Extension Service's Dean and Director's Distinguished Friend of Extension Award for "superior contributions as a legislative leader in helping others understand the need for strong agricultural support."

== World War II and community service ==
Erickson was born in Stanchfield, Minnesota, and was raised on the family farm. He graduated from Braham High School, in Braham, Minnesota. From the city of Hills, Erickson was a farm management instructor and vocational agriculture teacher. He served in the United States Army Infantry during World War II, being deployed in the Asiatic theatre for two years. Prior to being elected to the legislature, he taught agriculture at Hills-Beaver Creek High School for 17 years. He also taught seventh- and eighth-grade industrial arts and young farmers classes, and was a longtime member of the Rock County Fair Board. He was in active retirement and was involved in his local community. Erickson served as grand marshal of the 125th Hills Celebration Parade in June 2015, after which a celebration was also held marking his 90th birthday.

== Death ==
Erickson died at the age of 93 on August 8, 2018, at Avera McKennan Hospital in Sioux Falls, South Dakota.
