= Hansonville =

Hansonville may refer to:

- Hansonville, Victoria, Australia
- Rackerby, California, formerly Hansonville
- Hansonville Township, Lincoln County, Minnesota
- Hansonville, Virginia, United States
- Hansonville, Alberta, Canada
