= Marshfield, Wisconsin (disambiguation) =

Marshfield, Wisconsin may refer to:

- Marshfield, Wisconsin, a city in Wood and Marathon Counties
- Marshfield, Fond du Lac County, Wisconsin, a town
- Marshfield (town), Wood County, Wisconsin, a town
