= Verdi (disambiguation) =

Giuseppe Verdi (1813–1901) is an Italian opera composer.

Verdi may also refer to:

- Verdi (name)

== Places ==
- Verdi, Iran, a village in Markazi Province
- Verdi, California, a census-designated place in Sierra County
- Verdi, Kansas, an unincorporated community in Ottawa County, Kansas
- Verdi, Minnesota, an unincorporated community located in Verdi Township, Lincoln County
- Verdi Township, Lincoln County, Minnesota
- Verdi, Nevada
  - Verdi Lake (Nevada), a glacial tarn in the Ruby Mountains of Elko County
  - Verdi-Mogul, Nevada, former census-designated place (CDP) in Washoe County
  - Verdi Peak (Nevada), a group of three mountain peaks in the Ruby Mountains of Elko County
- Verdi Range, a mountain range in Sierra County, California
- Verdi (crater), an impact crater on Mercury

== Other uses ==
- Verdi (album), 2000 album by Andrea Bocelli
- USS Verdi (SP-979), a United States Navy patrol boat in commission from 1917 to 1918
- Federation of the Greens, a political party in Italy, known colloquially as Verdi (Greens)
- Federation of Green Lists, a former political party in Italy
- V.E.R.D.I., acronym of Vittorio Emanuele, Re D’Italia, Victor Emmanuel II of Italy (1820–1878), the Italian unification movement, named after the composer Giuseppe Verdi (ardent supporter of the movement)
- ver.di, Vereinte Dienstleistungsgewerkschaft (United Service Sector Union), German trade union
