= Yellow Medicine =

Yellow Medicine could refer to two distinct things in the U.S. state of Minnesota:

- Yellow Medicine River, a river
- Yellow Medicine County, Minnesota, a county
