= Diamond Lake Township =

Diamond Lake Township may refer to the following townships in the United States:

- Diamond Lake Township, Dickinson County, Iowa
- Diamond Lake Township, Lincoln County, Minnesota
