= Verdini (disambiguation) =

Vewrdini may refer to:

- Denis Verdini (born 1951), Italian politician and banker
- Luca Verdini (born 1985), Italian motorcycle racer

== See also ==
- Verdin (disambiguation)
