= Andy Steensma =

American politician

Member of the Minnesota House of Representatives from the 27B and 21B district
- In office January 6, 1987 – January 2, 1995
- Preceded by: Wendell Erickson
- Succeeded by: Richard Mulder

Personal details
- Born: September 29, 1942 (age 83)
- Party: Democratic Farmer Labor Party
- Spouse: Elaine (Fikse) Steensma
- Children: 4
- Occupation: farmer, legislator, mayor

Andrew Steensma (born September 29, 1942) is a Minnesota politician, a former member of the Minnesota House of Representatives from southwestern Minnesota, and the former mayor of the city of Luverne.

Steensma was first elected to the Minnesota House in 1986 when he unseated longtime incumbent Wendell Erickson in the Democratic-Farmer-Labor Party's "firestorm" that swept through the region, giving Democrats unprecedented control of southwestern Minnesota for the next several election cycles. He represented the old District 27B and, later, District 21B, which included all or portions of Lincoln, Lyon, Murray, Nobles, Pipestone and Rock counties. He was re-elected in 1988, 1990 and 1992.

Steensma grew up and farms in the Luverne area. While in the Minnesota Legislature, he earned a reputation as a strong advocate for farmers and agricultural issues. He served on the House Agriculture, Appropriations, Economic Development, Health and Human Services, Transportation and Transit, and General Legislation committees, and on various sub-committees relevant to each area.

Steensma was elected mayor of Luverne in 2004, and served until January 2011. The community is located in Rock County just east of Sioux Falls, South Dakota. He and his wife, Elaine, are the parents of four children.
