= Spring Creek (Minnesota) =

- Spring Creek being used for snowmobile recreation during a cold Minnesota winter

- Mouth of the Spring Creek

Location
- Country: United States
- State: Minnesota
- County: Yellow Medicine

Physical characteristics
- Source
  - coordinates: 44.7902397°N 96.1353171°W
- Mouth
  - coordinates: 44°42′38″N 95°40′23″W
- Length: 33.4 miles (53.8 km) (perennial)

Basin features
- River system: Yellow Medicine River

Spring Creek is a short river in southwestern Minnesota. It is a headwater to the Yellow Medicine River, which is a tributary to the Minnesota River. Springs are part of the source of the creek's water, hence the name. In the winter, the springs may cause the ice to be thinner and weaker over and downstream of the spring. Spring Creek has a perennial length of 33.4 miles (53.8 km), and can reach a total length of 46 miles (74 km) when conditions permit. Spring Creek flows entirely within the boundaries of Yellow Medicine County.

The shallow water can be completely frozen in the cold winters, which results in fish kill. Increasing environmental pressures have degraded the amount of game fish present. In past years, it was not unusual to find large Northern Pike and other predatory species. Most fish caught are bullheads and carp. Grasses and trees border the river for much of its length, and provides habitat for a variety of wildlife. Due to the large number of trees edging the creek, there are many fallen trees which make navigation by canoe difficult or impossible. Beavers have also taken advantage of the trees and built several dams.

== Fish in Spring Creek ==
- Bullhead
- Carp
- Northern Pike
- Smallmouth bass
- Other Rough Fish

== See also ==
- List of rivers of Minnesota
- List of longest streams of Minnesota
