= Ash Lake (Lincoln County, Minnesota) =

Lake in the state of Minnesota, United States

- Location within Minnesota
- Location: Lincoln County, Minnesota, U.S.
- Coordinates: 44°25′23″N 96°17′41″W
- Type: Lake

North Ash Lake and South Ash Lake are a pair of adjacent lakes in Lincoln County, near the city of Ivanhoe in the U.S. state of Minnesota.

The 300-acre Ash Lake Wildlife Management Area is situated along the western shores of the lakes.

Ash Lake was named for the white ash trees near the lake.

== See also ==
- List of lakes in Minnesota
