= John Cantius =

Polish priest, scholastic philosopher, physicist and theologian

Saint John Cantius
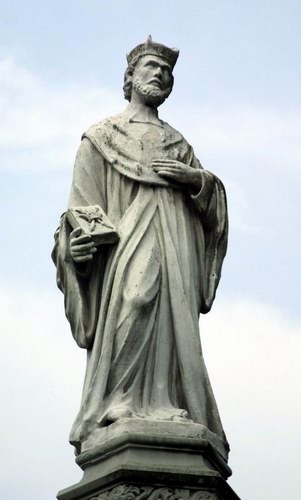
- Saint John Cantius

Confessor
- Born: June 23, 1390; Kęty, Oświęcim, Crown of the Kingdom of Poland
- Died: December 24, 1473 (aged 83); Kraków, Crown of the Kingdom of Poland
- Venerated in: Catholic Church
- Beatified: 28 March 1676, Rome by Pope Clement X
- Canonized: 1767, Rome by Pope Clement XIII
- Major shrine: Church of St. Anne; Kraków, Poland
- Feast: 23 December; 20 October (Poland, General Roman Calendar 1770–1969)
- Attributes: in a professor's gown with his arm around shoulder of a young student whose gaze is directed towards Heaven; giving his garments to the poor
- Patronage: Poland; Lithuania; Jagiellonian University
- Theology career
- Education: Kraków Academy
- Theological work
- Main interests: Biblical studies

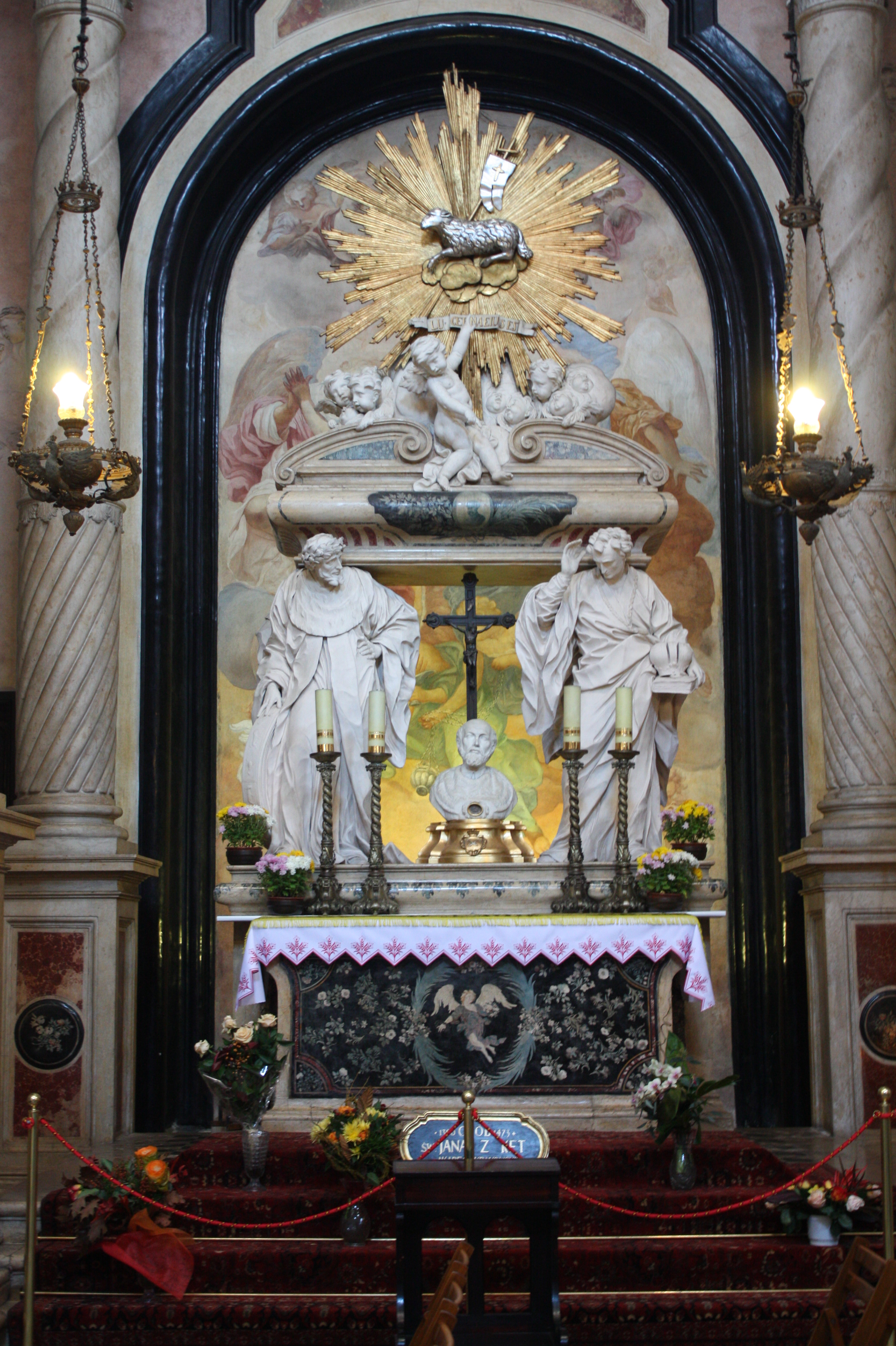
Tomb of Saint John Cantius. Church of St. Anne, Kraków, Poland.

John Cantius (Latin: Joannes Cantius; Polish: Jan z Kęt or Jan Kanty; 23 June 1390 – 24 December 1473) was a Polish Catholic priest, scholastic philosopher, physicist and theologian.

== Biography ==
John Cantius was born in Kęty, a small town near Oświęcim, Poland, to Anna and Stanisław Kanty. He attended the Kraków Academy at which he attained bachelor, and licentiate. In 1418 he became a Doctor of Philosophy. Upon graduation he spent the next three years conducting philosophy classes at the university, while preparing for the priesthood.

Upon his ordination, he became rector at the school of the Canons Regular of the Most Holy Sepulcher in Miechow. While there, he was offered a professorship of Sacra Scriptura (Holy Scripture) back at his alma mater, the Kraków Academy, which would later be named the Jagiellonian University. He attained a doctorate in theology and eventually became director of the theology department. He held the professorship until his death in 1473. Cantius spent many hours copying manuscripts of the Holy Scriptures, theological tracts, and other scholarly works.

During his time in Kraków, Cantius became well known in the city for his generosity and compassion toward the poor, especially needy students at the university. He subsisted on what was strictly necessary to sustain his life, giving alms regularly to the poor. He made one pilgrimage to Jerusalem and four pilgrimages on foot to Rome.

Michael Miechowita, the medieval Polish historian and Cantius's first biographer, described Cantius's extreme humility and charity; he took as his motto:

Conturbare cave: non est placare suave,
Infamare cave; nam revocare grave.
(Beware disturbing: it's not sweetly pleasing,
Beware speaking ill: for taking back words is burdensome.)

He died while living in retirement at his alma mater on 24 December 1473, aged 83. His remains were interred in the Collegiate Church of St Anne, where his tomb became and remains a popular pilgrimage site. He is the patron of the diocese of Bielsko-Żywiec (since 1992), and of the students.

== Veneration ==
John Cantius was beatified in Rome by Pope Clement X on 28 March 1676. He was named patron of Poland and Lithuania by Pope Clement XII in 1737. Ninety-one years after his beatification, John Cantius was canonized on 16 July 1767, by Pope Clement XIII.

The Roman Breviary distinguishes him with three hymns; he is the only confessor who is not a bishop to have been given this honor in the Catholic liturgy.

St. John Cantius is a popular saint in Poland. A number of churches and schools founded by Polish diaspora communities throughout North America are named in his honor, in cities as far-ranging as Cleveland, Ohio; Winnipeg, Manitoba; Detroit, Michigan; Chicago, Illinois; Rolling Prairie, Indiana, Milwaukee, Wisconsin; St. Cloud, Minnesota; Wilno, Minnesota, Philadelphia, Erie, and Windber, Pennsylvania; New York City and Buffalo, New York.

"John Cantius" has been used as a first and middle name—see, for example, John Cantius Garand.

== Feast day ==
When St. John Cantius's feast day was first inserted into the General Roman Calendar in 1770, it was initially assigned to 20 October, but in the calendar reform of 1969 it was moved to 23 December, the day before the anniversary of his death, which occurred on Christmas Eve 1473.

== See also ==
- Canons Regular of Saint John Cantius
- St. John Cantius Church (Chicago)
- St. John Cantius Church in the article on Wilno, Minnesota
- Saint John Cantius, patron saint archive
