= Limestone Township, Lincoln County, Minnesota =

Limestone Township, Minnesota
- Township
- Location within the state of Minnesota Limestone Township, Minnesota (the United States)
- Coordinates: 44°30′N 96°9′W
- Country: United States
- State: Minnesota
- County: Lincoln

Area
  - Total: 34.6 sq mi (89.6 km^{2})
  - Land: 34.2 sq mi (88.7 km^{2})
  - Water: 0.35 sq mi (0.9 km^{2})
- Elevation: 1,519 ft (463 m)

Population (2000)
  - Total: 159
  - Density: 4.7/sq mi (1.8/km^{2})
- Time zone: UTC-6 (Central (CST))
  - Summer (DST): UTC-5 (CDT)
- FIPS code: 27-37106
- GNIS feature ID: 0664784

Limestone Township is a township in Lincoln County, Minnesota, United States. The population was 159 at the 2000 census.

Limestone Township was named for the limestone boulders dotting its landscape.

== Geography ==
According to the United States Census Bureau, the township has a total area of 34.6 square miles (89.6 km^{2}), of which 34.3 square miles (88.8 km^{2}) is land and 0.3 square mile (0.9 km^{2}) (0.95%) is water.

== Demographics ==
As of the census of 2000, there were 159 people, 61 households, and 50 families residing in the township. The population density was 4.6 inhabitants per square mile (1.8/km^{2}). There were 64 housing units at an average density of 1.9 per square mile (0.73/km^{2}). The racial makeup of the township was 97.48% White, 2.52% from other races. Hispanic or Latino of any race were 2.52% of the population.

There were 61 households, out of which 36.1% had children under the age of 18 living with them, 77.0% were married couples living together, 3.3% had a female householder with no husband present, and 18.0% were non-families. 18.0% of all households were made up of individuals, and 13.1% had someone living alone who was 65 years of age or older. The average household size was 2.61 and the average family size was 2.94.

In the township the population was spread out, with 23.9% under the age of 18, 7.5% from 18 to 24, 22.6% from 25 to 44, 25.8% from 45 to 64, and 20.1% who were 65 years of age or older. The median age was 39 years. For every 100 females, there were 112.0 males. For every 100 females age 18 and over, there were 116.1 males.

The median income for a household in the township was $33,750, and the median income for a family was $43,750. Males had a median income of $12,083 versus $20,417 for females. The per capita income for the township was $14,123. About 8.3% of families and 11.0% of the population were below the poverty line, including none of those under the age of eighteen and 19.4% of those 65 or over.
