= Hope Township, Lincoln County, Minnesota =

Hope Township, Minnesota
- Township
- Location within the state of Minnesota Hope Township, Minnesota (the United States)
- Coordinates: 44°14′0″N 96°8′39″W
- Country: United States
- State: Minnesota
- County: Lincoln

Area
  - Total: 34.8 sq mi (90.2 km^{2})
  - Land: 34.8 sq mi (90.2 km^{2})
  - Water: 0 sq mi (0.0 km^{2})
- Elevation: 1,719 ft (524 m)

Population (2000)
  - Total: 292
  - Density: 8.3/sq mi (3.2/km^{2})
- Time zone: UTC-6 (Central (CST))
  - Summer (DST): UTC-5 (CDT)
- FIPS code: 27-30104
- GNIS feature ID: 0664517

Hope Township is a township in Lincoln County, Minnesota, United States. The population was 292 at the 2000 census.

== Geography ==
According to the United States Census Bureau, the township has a total area of 34.8 square miles (90 km^{2}), all land.

== Demographics ==
As of the census of 2000, there were 292 people, 109 households, and 82 families residing in the township. The population density was 8.4 inhabitants per square mile (3.2/km^{2}). There were 117 housing units at an average density of 3.4 per square mile (1.3/km^{2}). The racial makeup of the township was 98.97% White, 0.34% from other races, and 0.68% from two or more races.

There were 109 households, out of which 36.7% had children under the age of 18 living with them, 73.4% were married couples living together, 0.9% had a female householder with no husband present, and 23.9% were non-families. 20.2% of all households were made up of individuals, and 4.6% had someone living alone who was 65 years of age or older. The average household size was 2.68 and the average family size was 3.12.

In the township the population was spread out, with 30.5% under the age of 18, 5.1% from 18 to 24, 29.5% from 25 to 44, 21.6% from 45 to 64, and 13.4% who were 65 years of age or older. The median age was 38 years. For every 100 females, there were 110.1 males. For every 100 females age 18 and over, there were 109.3 males.

The median income for a household in the township was $41,667, and the median income for a family was $44,750. Males had a median income of $31,250 versus $19,583 for females. The per capita income for the township was $16,916. About 6.2% of families and 5.5% of the population were below the poverty line, including 5.8% of those under the age of eighteen and none of those 65 or over.
