= Lake Benton Township, Lincoln County, Minnesota =

Lake Benton Township, Minnesota
- Township
- Location within the state of Minnesota Lake Benton Township, Minnesota (the United States)
- Coordinates: 44°15′7″N 96°15′1″W
- Country: United States
- State: Minnesota
- County: Lincoln

Area
  - Total: 33.8 sq mi (87.5 km^{2})
  - Land: 33.3 sq mi (86.2 km^{2})
  - Water: 0.50 sq mi (1.3 km^{2})
- Elevation: 1,864 ft (568 m)

Population (2000)
  - Total: 244
  - Density: 7.3/sq mi (2.8/km^{2})
- Time zone: UTC-6 (Central (CST))
  - Summer (DST): UTC-5 (CDT)
- ZIP code: 56149
- Area code: 507
- FIPS code: 27-34118
- GNIS feature ID: 0664664

Lake Benton Township is a township in Lincoln County, Minnesota, United States. The population was 244 at the 2000 census.

This township took its name from Lake Benton.

== Geography ==
According to the United States Census Bureau, the township has a total area of 33.8 square miles (88 km^{2}), of which 33.3 square miles (86 km^{2}) is land and 0.5 square miles (1.3 km^{2}) (1.48%) is water.

== Demographics ==
As of the census of 2000, there were 244 people, 94 households, and 73 families residing in the township. The population density was 7.3 inhabitants per square mile (2.8/km^{2}). There were 129 housing units at an average density of 3.9 per square mile (1.5/km^{2}). The racial makeup of the township was 100.00% White.

There were 94 households, out of which 33.0% had children under the age of 18 living with them, 70.2% were married couples living together, 3.2% had a female householder with no husband present, and 21.3% were non-families. 19.1% of all households were made up of individuals, and 3.2% had someone living alone who was 65 years of age or older. The average household size was 2.60 and the average family size was 2.99.

In the township the population was spread out, with 26.6% under the age of 18, 6.1% from 18 to 24, 26.2% from 25 to 44, 28.3% from 45 to 64, and 12.7% who were 65 years of age or older. The median age was 40 years. For every 100 females, there were 119.8 males. For every 100 females age 18 and over, there were 115.7 males.

The median income for a household in the township was $35,625, and the median income for a family was $40,625. Males had a median income of $21,125 versus $17,000 for females. The per capita income for the township was $13,870. About 6.4% of families and 8.8% of the population were below the poverty line, including 7.3% of those under the age of eighteen and 15.4% of those 65 or over.
