= Kęty =

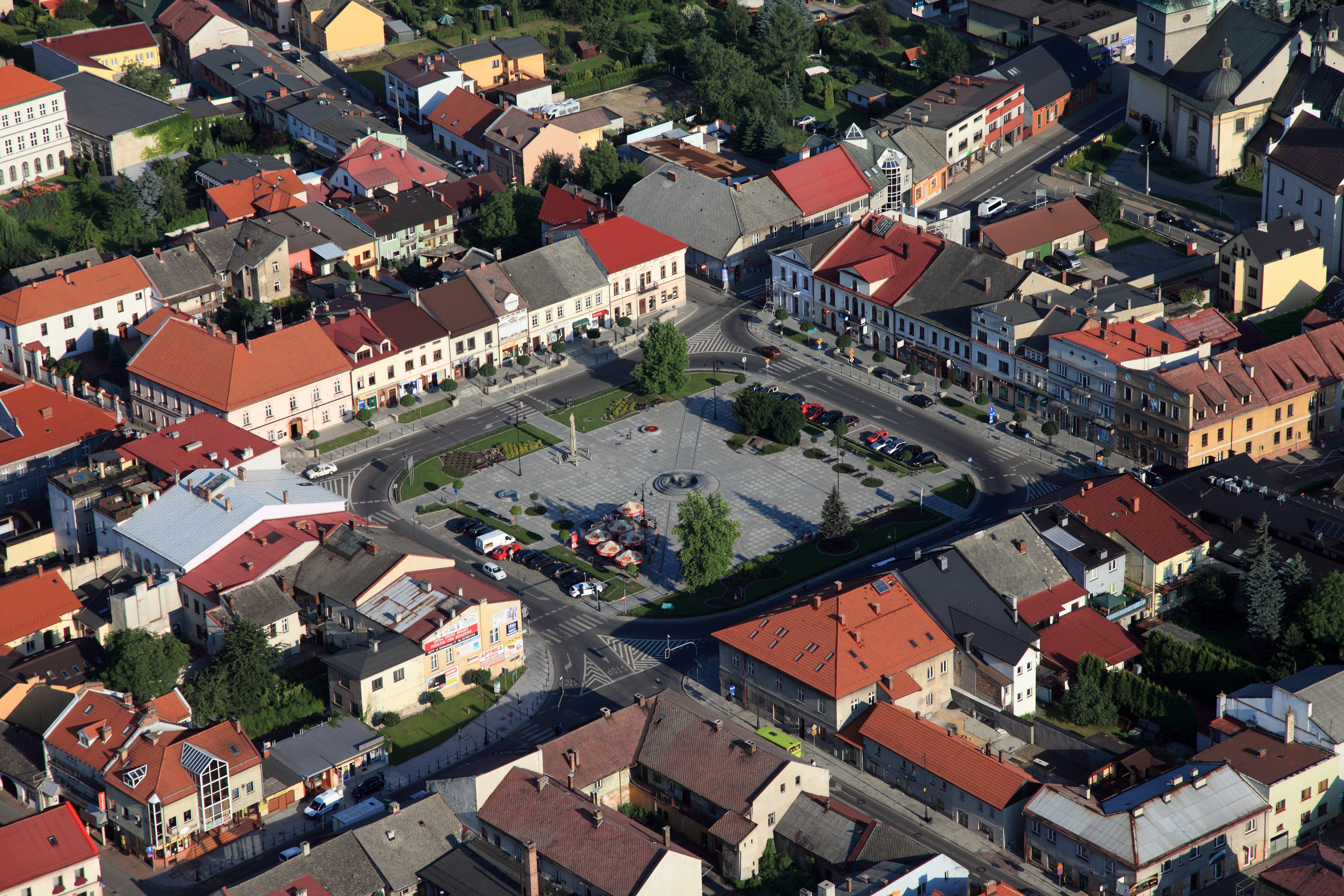
- Central Kęty

- Coat of arms

- Location within Poland
- Coordinates: 49°54′N 19°13′E
- Country: Poland
- Voivodeship: Lesser Poland
- County: Oświęcim
- Gmina: Kęty

Government
  - Mayor: Marcin Śliwa

Area
  - Total: 23.14 km^{2} (8.93 sq mi)
- Elevation: 315 m (1,033 ft)

Population (2023)
  - Total: 17,669
  - Density: 763.6/km^{2} (1,978/sq mi)
- Time zone: UTC+1 (CET)
  - Summer (DST): UTC+2 (CEST)
- Postal code: 32-650
- Car plates: KOS
- Website: http://www.kety.pl

Kęty [ˈkɛntɨ] is a town in Oświęcim County, Lesser Poland Voivodeship, in southern Poland with 18,955 inhabitants (2012).

== Etymology ==
The town's name comes from the word kąt (Polish for corner).

== History ==
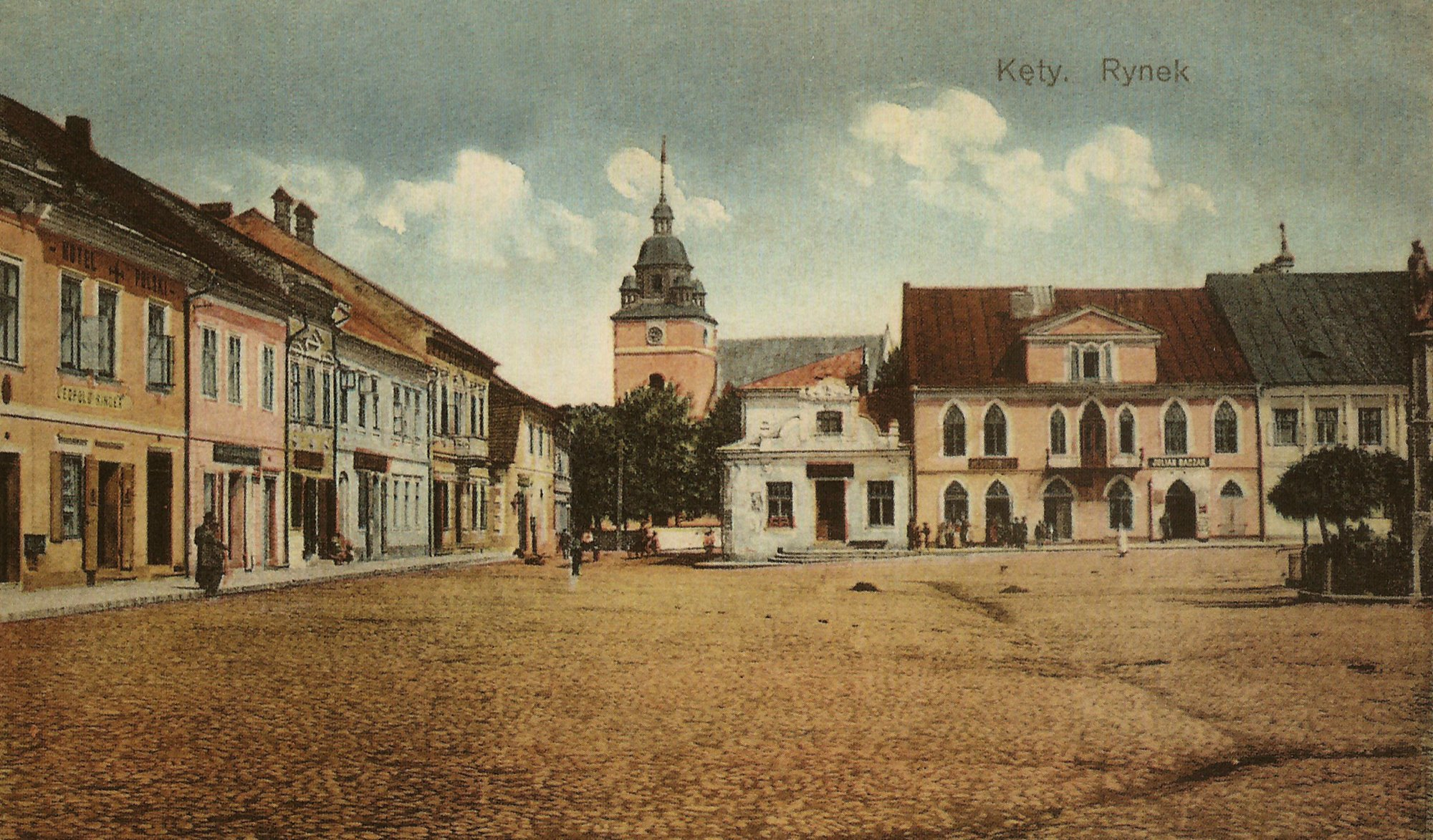
Kęty in c. 1915

The town located in Silesian Foothills dates its earliest document from 1277 when Polish Duke Vladislaus I of Opole confirmed sale of the settlement and adoption of town rights modelled after Lwówek. The greatest development of the town came under the rule of Jagiellons, when the town became royal property. It was administratively located in the Kraków Voivodeship in the Lesser Poland Province.

The son of the mayor of the town of Kęty, Stanislaus Bacenga and his wife Anna became the Saint John Cantius, also known as John of Kraków.

According to the 1921 census, the population was 99.2% Polish and 0.6% Jewish.

Following the German-Soviet invasion of Poland, which started World War II in September 1939, Kęty was occupied by Germany until 1945.

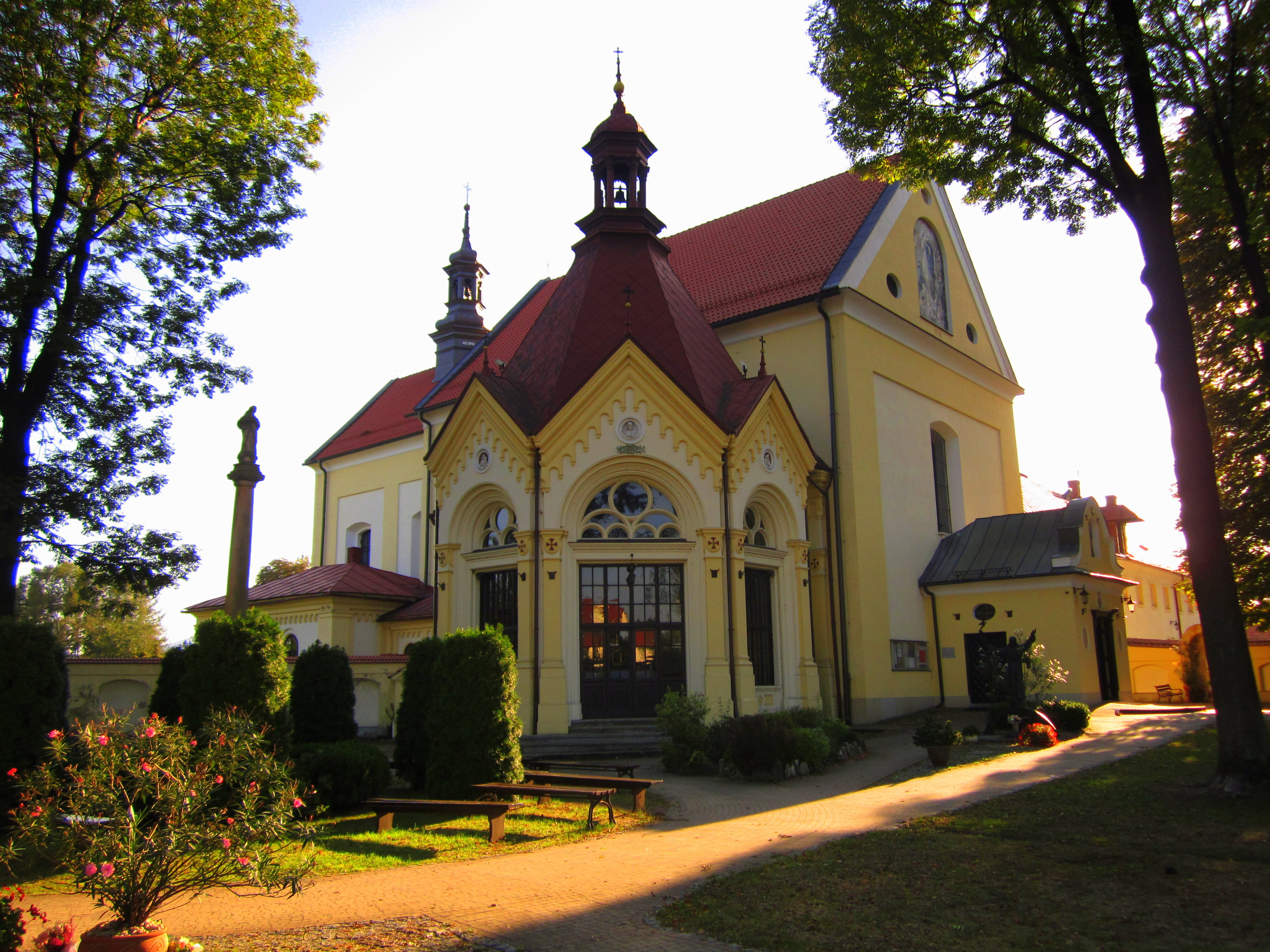
Baroque Franciscan church and monastery

== Education ==
- Publiczne Przedszkole Sióstr Zmartwychwstanek im. bł. Matki Celiny Borzęckiej
- Zespół Szkolno-Gimnazjalny Nr 1 w Kętach
- Zespół Szkolno-Gimnazjalny Nr 2 w Kętach
- Zespół Szkół Podstawowo-Gimnazjalnych nr 3 w Kętach-Podlesiu im. Bohaterów Westerplatte
- Powiatowy Zespół nr 9 Szkół im. Marii Dąbrowskiej w Kętach
- Powiatowy Zespół nr 10 Szkół Mechaniczno-Elektrycznych im. M. Kopernika
- Powiatowy Zespół nr 11 Szkół Ogólnokształcących im. St. Wyspiańskiego
- Centrum Kształcenia Dorosłych w Kętach

== International relations ==
=== Twin towns — Sister cities ===
Kęty is twinned with:

- (Slovakia) Turzovka

== Notable people ==
Notable people from Kęty include:

- Marion Zioncheck (1900–1936), American politician
- John Cantius (1390–1473), Catholic priest, scholastic philosopher, physicist, theologian, and saint.
