= Minnesota's Machinery Museum =

History museum in Hanley Falls, Minnesota

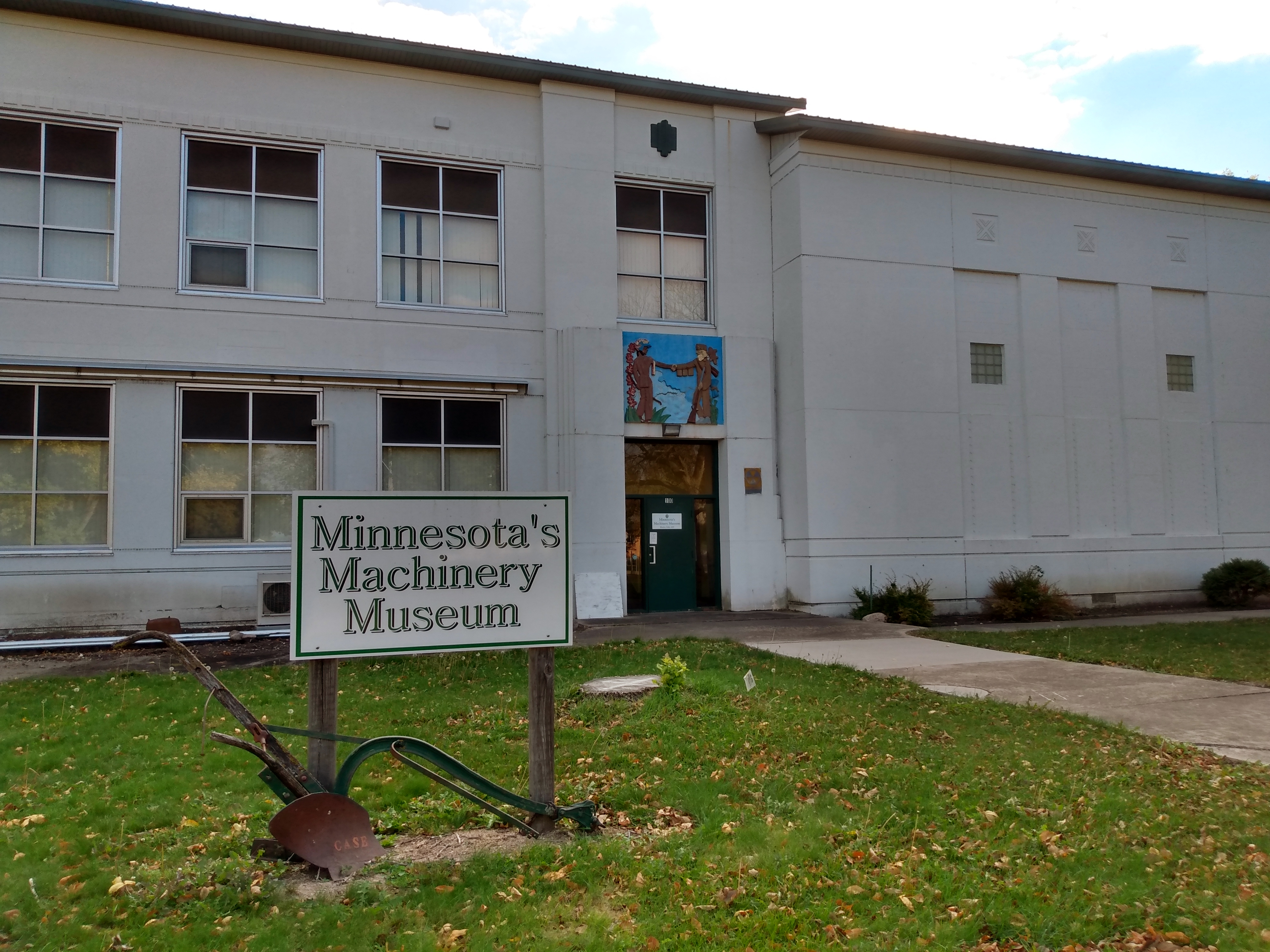
- Established: 1980
- Location: 100 North First Street, Hanley Falls, Minnesota, US
- Coordinates: 44°41′30.63″N 95°37′10.23″W

Minnesota's Machinery Museum is an agricultural museum in Hanley Falls, Minnesota, United States. The museum contains Minnesota's largest collection of agricultural exhibits and equipment.

== History ==
The museum is located in the former Hanley Falls School, erected in 1939 by the Works Progress Administration. The school closed in 1978, and the building was purchased by the county and donated to Hanley Falls for a museum, which opened in 1980.

== Exhibits ==
The museum features five buildings on a six-acre (2.4 ha) site. Exhibits include tractors and gas engines, tools, rural art, farm implements, a general store, vintage automobiles, railroad memorabilia, quilts, horse equipment, and a blacksmith shop.

The museum hosts an annual threshing show, which features a tractor pull, antique tractor parades, and demonstrations of baling straw and threshing oats.

A picnic area, campground, and gift shop are located at the museum.
