= Lake Stay Township, Lincoln County, Minnesota =

Lake Stay Township, Minnesota
- Township
- Location within the state of Minnesota Lake Stay Township, Minnesota (the United States)
- Coordinates: 44°24′39″N 96°9′5″W
- Country: United States
- State: Minnesota
- County: Lincoln

Area
  - Total: 35.6 sq mi (92.3 km^{2})
  - Land: 35.0 sq mi (90.7 km^{2})
  - Water: 0.62 sq mi (1.6 km^{2})
- Elevation: 1,601 ft (488 m)

Population (2000)
  - Total: 143
  - Density: 4.1/sq mi (1.6/km^{2})
- Time zone: UTC-6 (Central (CST))
  - Summer (DST): UTC-5 (CDT)
- FIPS code: 27-35054
- GNIS feature ID: 0664703

Lake Stay Township is a township in Lincoln County, Minnesota, United States. The population was 143 at the 2000 census.

This township took its name from Lake Stay.

== Geography ==
According to the United States Census Bureau, the township has a total area of 35.6 square miles (92 km^{2}), of which 35.0 square miles (91 km^{2}) is land and 0.6 square miles (1.6 km^{2}) (1.71%) is water.

== Demographics ==
As of the census of 2000, there were 143 people, 58 households, and 46 families residing in the township. The population density was 4.1 inhabitants per square mile (1.6/km^{2}). There were 62 housing units at an average density of 1.8 per square mile (0.69/km^{2}). The racial makeup of the township was 100.00% White.

There were 58 households, out of which 24.1% had children under the age of 18 living with them, 72.4% were married couples living together, 5.2% had a female householder with no husband present, and 19.0% were non-families. 17.2% of all households were made up of individuals, and 5.2% had someone living alone who was 65 years of age or older. The average household size was 2.47 and the average family size was 2.72.

In the township the population was spread out, with 20.3% under the age of 18, 5.6% from 18 to 24, 25.2% from 25 to 44, 34.3% from 45 to 64, and 14.7% who were 65 years of age or older. The median age was 42 years. For every 100 females, there were 95.9 males. For every 100 females age 18 and over, there were 103.6 males.

The median income for a household in the township was $39,688, and the median income for a family was $41,875. Males had a median income of $27,500 versus $20,833 for females. The per capita income for the township was $26,657. There were 5.7% of families and 8.8% of the population living below the poverty line, including 19.4% of under eighteens and none of those over 64.
