= Shaokatan Township, Lincoln County, Minnesota =

Shaokatan Township, Minnesota
- Township
- Location within the state of Minnesota Shaokatan Township, Minnesota (the United States)
- Coordinates: 44°24′30″N 96°22′46″W
- Country: United States
- State: Minnesota
- County: Lincoln

Area
  - Total: 38.3 sq mi (99.2 km^{2})
  - Land: 36.6 sq mi (94.9 km^{2})
  - Water: 1.6 sq mi (4.2 km^{2})
- Elevation: 1,795 ft (547 m)

Population (2000)
  - Total: 192
  - Density: 5.2/sq mi (2/km^{2})
- Time zone: UTC-6 (Central (CST))
  - Summer (DST): UTC-5 (CDT)
- FIPS code: 27-59377
- GNIS feature ID: 0665583

Shaokatan Township is a township in Lincoln County, Minnesota, United States. The population was 192 at the 2000 census.

Shaokatan Township took its name from Lake Shaokatan.

== Geography ==
According to the United States Census Bureau, the township has a total area of 38.3 square miles (99.2 km^{2}), of which 36.7 square miles (94.9 km^{2}) is land and 1.6 square miles (4.2 km^{2}) (4.28%) is water.

== Demographics ==
As of the census of 2000, there were 192 people, 71 households, and 59 families residing in the township. The population density was 5.2 people per square mile (2.0/km^{2}). There were 109 housing units at an average density of 3.0/sq mi (1.1/km^{2}). The racial makeup of the township was 98.96% White and 1.04% Asian.

There were 71 households, out of which 32.4% had children under the age of 18 living with them, 81.7% were married couples living together, and 16.9% were non-families. 15.5% of all households were made up of individuals, and 4.2% had someone living alone who was 65 years of age or older. The average household size was 2.70 and the average family size was 3.00.

In the township the population was spread out, with 29.2% under the age of 18, 4.2% from 18 to 24, 22.4% from 25 to 44, 26.0% from 45 to 64, and 18.2% who were 65 years of age or older. The median age was 41 years. For every 100 females, there were 120.7 males. For every 100 females age 18 and over, there were 109.2 males.

The median income for a household in the township was $28,929, and the median income for a family was $29,464. Males had a median income of $22,500 versus $20,417 for females. The per capita income for the township was $11,859. About 13.2% of families and 14.2% of the population were below the poverty line, including 20.3% of those under the age of eighteen and 17.4% of those 65 or over.
