= Lake Stay (Minnesota) =

Lake in the state of Minnesota, United States

Coordinates: 44°23′27″N 96°10′12″W

- Location within Minnesota Location within the United States
- Location: Lincoln County, Minnesota
- Type: Natural freshwater lake
- Basin countries: United States
- Max. length: 4,875 ft (1,486 m)
- Max. width: 2,875 ft (876 m)
- Surface elevation: 1,647 ft (502 m)
- Settlements: Arco, Minnesota

Lake Stay is a lake in Lincoln County, in the U.S. state of Minnesota.

Lake Stay was named for Frank Stay, a soldier in the Dakota War of 1862.

== See also ==
- List of lakes in Minnesota
