= Hanley Falls, Minnesota =

City in Minnesota, United States

Hanley Falls
- City
- Location of Hanley Falls, Minnesota
- Coordinates: 44°41′31″N 95°37′10″W
- Country: United States
- State: Minnesota
- County: Yellow Medicine

Government

Area
  - Total: 0.25 sq mi (0.65 km^{2})
  - Land: 0.25 sq mi (0.65 km^{2})
  - Water: 0 sq mi (0.00 km^{2})
- Elevation: 1,050 ft (320 m)

Population (2020)
  - Total: 243
  - Density: 974.5/sq mi (376.27/km^{2})
- Time zone: UTC-6 (Central (CST))
  - Summer (DST): UTC-5 (CDT)
- ZIP code: 56245
- Area code: 507
- FIPS code: 27-26972
- GNIS feature ID: 2394285

Hanley Falls is a city in Yellow Medicine County, Minnesota, United States. The population was 243 at the 2020 census.

Minnesota's Machinery Museum is located in Hanley Falls.

== History ==
Hanley Falls was laid out in 1884 when the Minneapolis and St. Louis Railway was extended to that point. The city was named after a railroad official. A post office has been in operation at Hanley Falls since 1887. Hanley Falls was incorporated in 1892.

== Geography ==
According to the United States Census Bureau, the city has a total area of 0.25 square miles (0.65 km^{2}), all land.

The Yellow Medicine River flows through the city.

Minnesota State Highway 23 serves as a main route in the community.

Two railroad lines intersect on the northwest side of town; the question of whether the state of Minnesota could order installation of an interchange track between the two independent railroads led to a 1900 U.S. Supreme Court decision which affirmed that the state could indeed order the establishment of the "Hanley Falls Wye" for the public convenience, despite the railroads' opposition.

== Demographics ==
Historical population
Census	Pop.	Note	%±
1900	278		—
1910	275		−1.1%
1920	326		18.5%
1930	288		−11.7%
1940	336		16.7%
1950	320		−4.8%
1960	334		4.4%
1970	265		−20.7%
1980	265		0.0%
1990	246		−7.2%
2000	323		31.3%
2010	304		−5.9%
2020	243		−20.1%
U.S. Decennial Census

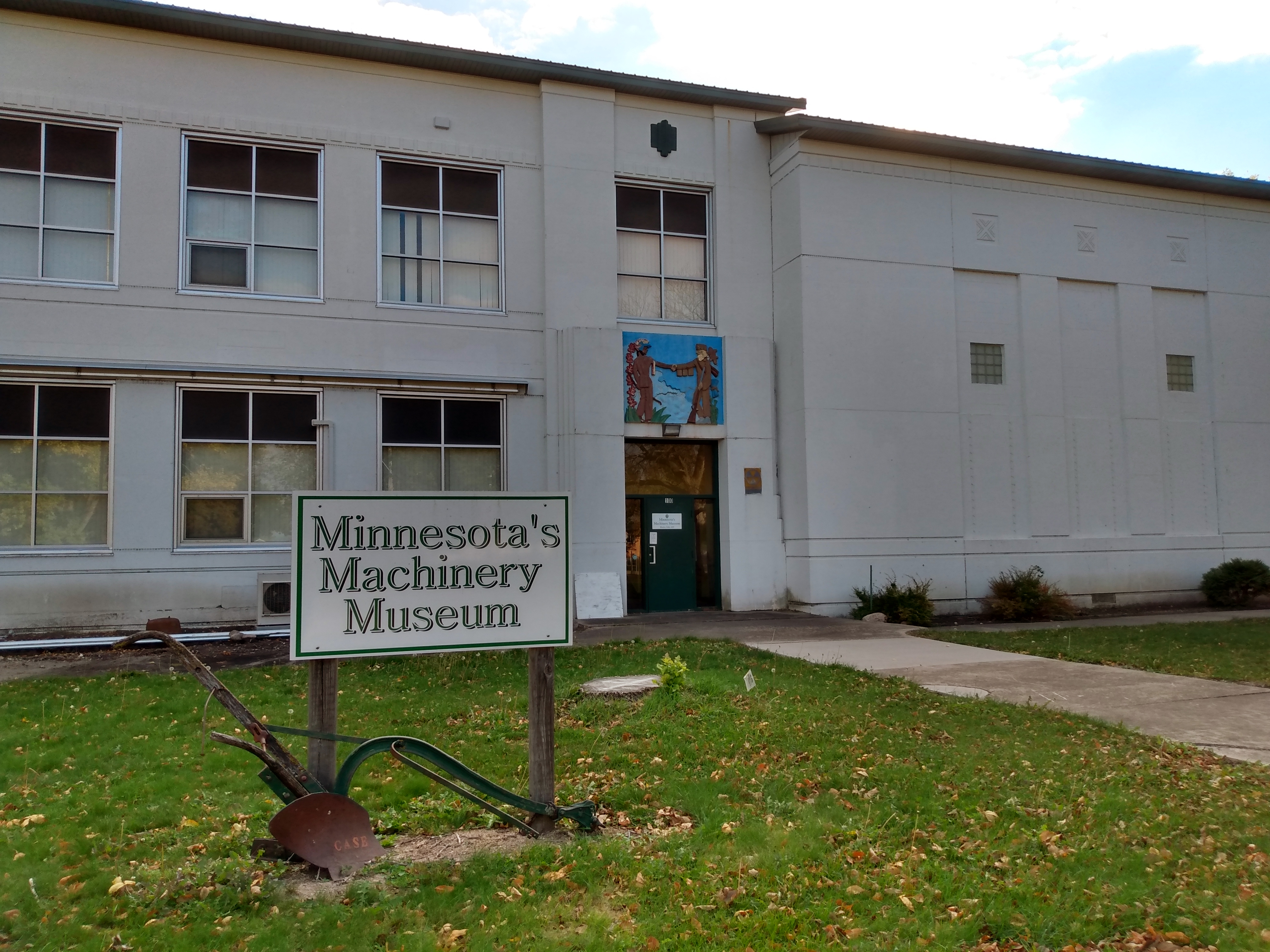
Minnesota's Machinery Museum in Hanley Falls

=== 2010 census ===
As of the census of 2010, there were 304 people, 107 households, and 74 families residing in the city. The population density was 1,216.0 inhabitants per square mile (469.5/km^{2}). There were 120 housing units at an average density of 480.0 per square mile (185.3/km^{2}). The racial makeup of the city was 92.8% White, 0.3% African American, 1.3% Native American, 1.3% Pacific Islander, 3.6% from other races, and 0.7% from two or more races. Hispanic or Latino of any race were 28.9% of the population.

There were 107 households, of which 45.8% had children under the age of 18 living with them, 55.1% were married couples living together, 12.1% had a female householder with no husband present, 1.9% had a male householder with no wife present, and 30.8% were non-families. 27.1% of all households were made up of individuals, and 7.5% had someone living alone who was 65 years of age or older. The average household size was 2.84 and the average family size was 3.51.

The median age in the city was 27.4 years. 36.5% of residents were under the age of 18; 10.5% were between the ages of 18 and 24; 23.7% were from 25 to 44; 21.6% were from 45 to 64; and 7.6% were 65 years of age or older. The gender makeup of the city was 53.0% male and 47.0% female.

=== 2000 census ===
As of the census of 2000, there were 323 people, 115 households, and 83 families residing in the city. The population density was 1,223.0 inhabitants per square mile (472.2/km^{2}). There were 123 housing units at an average density of 465.7 per square mile (179.8/km^{2}). The racial makeup of the city was 79.88% White, 0.62% African American, 0.93% Native American, 15.17% from other races, and 3.41% from two or more races. Hispanic or Latino of any race were 26.01% of the population.

There were 115 households, out of which 40.9% had children under the age of 18 living with them, 59.1% were married couples living together, 7.0% had a female householder with no husband present, and 27.8% were non-families. 22.6% of all households were made up of individuals, and 13.9% had someone living alone who was 65 years of age or older. The average household size was 2.81 and the average family size was 3.36.

In the city, the population was spread out, with 32.5% under the age of 18, 12.7% from 18 to 24, 30.0% from 25 to 44, 11.8% from 45 to 64, and 13.0% who were 65 years of age or older. The median age was 29 years. For every 100 females, there were 115.3 males. For every 100 females age 18 and over, there were 109.6 males.

The median income for a household in the city was $31,667, and the median income for a family was $37,500. Males had a median income of $25,833 versus $19,583 for females. The per capita income for the city was $14,248. About 17.1% of families and 16.4% of the population were below the poverty line, including 13.3% of those under age 18 and 18.9% of those age 65 or over.

== Arts and culture ==
Minnesota's Machinery Museum in Hanley Falls includes five buildings on a 6-acre (2.4 ha) site, and features the state's largest collection of agricultural equipment, exhibits, and artifacts.
