= Ash Lake Township, Lincoln County, Minnesota =

Ash Lake Township, Minnesota
- Township
- Location within the state of Minnesota
- Coordinates: 44°25′23″N 96°15′6″W
- Country: United States
- State: Minnesota
- County: Lincoln

Area
  - Total: 36.6 sq mi (94.9 km^{2})
  - Land: 36.1 sq mi (93.4 km^{2})
  - Water: 0.58 sq mi (1.5 km^{2})
- Elevation: 1,722 ft (525 m)

Population (2000)
  - Total: 177
  - Density: 4.9/sq mi (1.9/km^{2})
- Time zone: UTC-6 (Central (CST))
  - Summer (DST): UTC-5 (CDT)
- FIPS code: 27-02476
- GNIS feature ID: 0663466

Ash Lake Township is a township in Lincoln County, Minnesota, United States. The population was 133 at the 2020 census.

This township was named for Ash Lake.

== Geography ==
According to the United States Census Bureau, the township has a total area of 36.7 square miles (95 km^{2}), of which 36.1 square miles (93 km^{2}) is land and 0.6 square miles (1.6 km^{2}) (1.64%) is water.

== Demographics ==
As of the census of 2000, there were 177 people, 72 households, and 52 families residing in the township. The population density was 4.9 inhabitants per square mile (1.9/km^{2}). There were 76 housing units at an average density of 2.1 per square mile (0.81/km^{2}). The racial makeup of the township was 100.00% White.

There were 72 households, out of which 25.0% had children under the age of 18 living with them, 65.3% were married couples living together, 2.8% had a female householder with no husband present, and 26.4% were non-families. 25.0% of all households were made up of individuals, and 9.7% had someone living alone who was 65 years of age or older. The average household size was 2.46 and the average family size was 2.94.

In the township the population was spread out, with 24.3% under the age of 18, 6.2% from 18 to 24, 16.9% from 25 to 44, 32.8% from 45 to 64, and 19.8% who were 65 years of age or older. The median age was 46 years. For every 100 females, there were 115.9 males. For every 100 females age 18 and over, there were 127.1 males.

The median income for a household in the township was $31,750, and the median income for a family was $32,000. Males had a median income of $23,750 versus $12,500 for females. The per capita income for the township was $12,639. About 28.8% of families and 30.9% of the population were below the poverty line, including 36.2% of those under the age of eighteen and 20.0% of those 65 or over.
