= Marble Township, Lincoln County, Minnesota =

Marble Township, Minnesota
- Township
- Location within the state of Minnesota Marble Township, Minnesota (the United States)
- Coordinates: 44°35′N 96°17′W
- Country: United States
- State: Minnesota
- County: Lincoln

Area
  - Total: 36.5 sq mi (94.6 km^{2})
  - Land: 36.4 sq mi (94.4 km^{2})
  - Water: 0.077 sq mi (0.2 km^{2})
- Elevation: 1,578 ft (481 m)

Population (2000)
  - Total: 195
  - Density: 5.4/sq mi (2.1/km^{2})
- Time zone: UTC-6 (Central (CST))
  - Summer (DST): UTC-5 (CDT)
- FIPS code: 27-40436
- GNIS feature ID: 0664912

Marble Township is a township in Lincoln County, Minnesota, United States. The population was 195 at the 2000 census.

Marble Township was named for the boulders dotting its landscape, which despite the name, are composed of limestone, not marble.

== Geography ==
According to the United States Census Bureau, the township has a total area of 36.5 square miles (94.6 km^{2}), of which 36.5 square miles (94.4 km^{2}) is land and 0.1 square mile (0.2 km^{2}) (0.22%) is water.

== Demographics ==
As of the census of 2000, there were 195 people, 72 households, and 59 families residing in the township. The population density was 5.3 inhabitants per square mile (2.0/km^{2}). There were 80 housing units at an average density of 2.2 per square mile (0.85/km^{2}). The racial makeup of the township was 98.97% White and 1.03% Native American.

There were 72 households, out of which 27.8% had children under the age of 18 living with them, 75.0% were married couples living together, 2.8% had a female householder with no husband present, and 16.7% were non-families. 16.7% of all households were made up of individuals, and 9.7% had someone living alone who was 65 years of age or older. The average household size was 2.71 and the average family size was 3.03.

In the township, the population was spread out, with 24.1% under the age of 18, 8.2% from 18 to 24, 24.6% from 25 to 44, 22.1% from 45 to 64, and 21.0% who were 65 years of age or older. The median age was 41 years. For every 100 females, there were 109.7 males. For every 100 females age 18 and over, there were 124.2 males.

The median income for a household in the township was $35,208, and the median income for a family was $38,000. Males had a median income of $21,563 versus $15,625 for females. The per capita income for the township was $14,089. About 9.7% of families and 9.1% of the population were below the poverty line, including none of those under the age of eighteen and 31.3% of those 65 or over.
