= Vardin =

Vardin or Verdin (Persian: وردين) may refer to:

== Places ==
- Vardin, Ahar
- Vardin, Varzaqan

== People ==
- Alexandre Vardin, a French footballer
- Ilya Vardin, Bolshevik revolutionary also known as Illarion Mgeladze
