= Richard Mulder =

American physician and state politician (1938–2022)

Member of the Minnesota House of Representatives from the 21B district
- In office January 3, 1995 – January 6, 2003
- Preceded by: Andy Steensma
- Succeeded by: Brad Finstad

Personal details
- Born: May 8, 1938 Rock Valley, Iowa, U.S.
- Died: February 14, 2022 (aged 83) Ivanhoe, Minnesota, U.S.
- Party: Republican
- Spouse: Ruth VanBuren (m. 1964)
- Children: 4
- Education: University of South Dakota (BPharm); South Dakota State University (BM); University of Iowa (MD)

Richard Dean Mulder (May 8, 1938 – February 14, 2022) was an American politician and family physician in the state of Minnesota. He served in the Minnesota House of Representatives from 1995 until 2002.

In 2004, he served as a Minnesota state delegate at the 2004 Republican National Convention in New York.

== Early life and education ==
Mulder was born and raised in Rock Valley, Iowa, along with four siblings. He graduated from Rock Valley Public High School in 1956, and then attended South Dakota State University, graduating with a Bachelor's in Pharmacy in 1960. He later received a Bachelor's in Medicine from University of South Dakota in 1966, and later graduated with a Doctor of Medicine from the University of Iowa in 1969.

== Career ==
Mulder ran unsuccessfully as an Independent Republican candidate for the Minnesota House of Representatives in 1992. Running again with the party in 1994, Mulder won the District 21B election over Democratic incumbent Andy Steensma, 7,198 votes to 6,261.

In 1996, Mulder defended a state law supporting the practice of "drive-through" infant deliveries, saying "I made sure my wife stayed in the hospital five days, but then she told me it was a waste of money... I did some research and found that many mothers couldn't afford the longer stay and in most cases, it just wasn't necessary."

In 1998, he was given a 100% rating by Gun Owners of America.

== Death ==
Mulder died at his home in Ivanhoe, Minnesota on February 14, 2022, at the age of 83.
