= Carlos Torres-Verdin =

Carlos Torres-Verdin is Zarrow Centennial Professor in Petroleum Engineering at the University of Texas at Austin. He obtained his B.Sc. degree in geophysical engineering from the National Polytechnic Institute of México, his M.Sc. in electrical engineering from the University of Texas at Austin, and a Ph.D. from University of California at Berkeley. He has more than eight years of industrial experience and has been affiliated with UT Austin since 1999.

His research interests include formation evaluation, geophysics and well-logging.
