= Diamond Lake Township, Lincoln County, Minnesota =

Diamond Lake Township, Minnesota
- Township
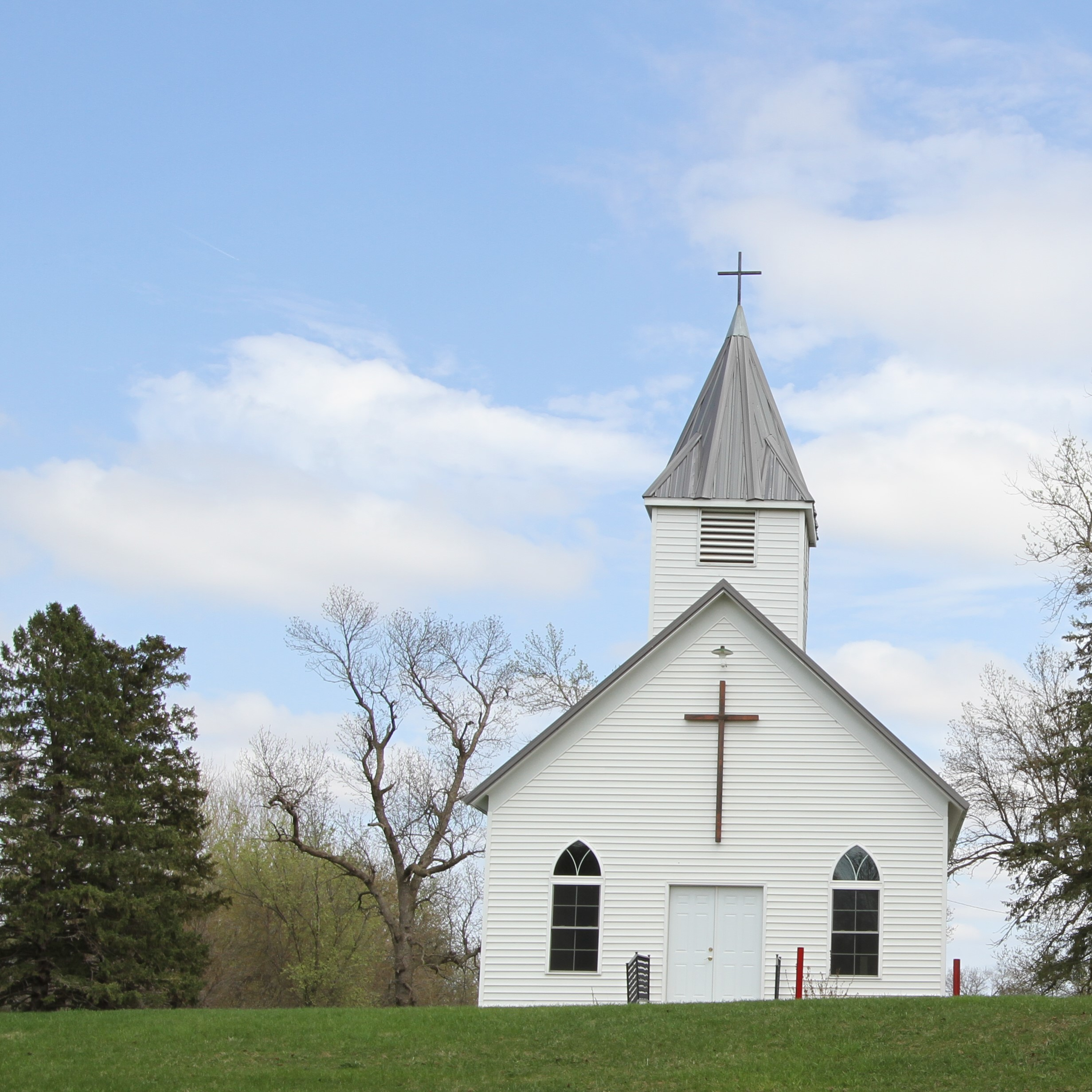
- Diamond Lake Lutheran, established 1886

- Location within the state of Minnesota Diamond Lake Township, Minnesota (the United States)
- Coordinates: 44°19′25″N 96°15′7″W
- Country: United States
- State: Minnesota
- County: Lincoln

Area
  - Total: 35.0 sq mi (90.7 km^{2})
  - Land: 32.2 sq mi (83.4 km^{2})
  - Water: 2.8 sq mi (7.3 km^{2})
- Elevation: 1,765 ft (538 m)

Population (2000)
  - Total: 231
  - Density: 7.3/sq mi (2.8/km^{2})
- Time zone: UTC-6 (Central (CST))
  - Summer (DST): UTC-5 (CDT)
- FIPS code: 27-15940
- GNIS feature ID: 0663978

Diamond Lake Township is a township in Lincoln County, Minnesota, United States. The population was 231 at the 2000 census.

Diamond Lake Township was named for a former lake in the shape of a diamond.

== Geography ==
According to the United States Census Bureau, the township has a total area of 35.0 square miles (91 km^{2}), of which 32.2 square miles (83 km^{2}) is land and 2.8 square miles (7.3 km^{2}) (8.05%) is water.

== Demographics ==
As of the census of 2000, there were 231 people, 85 households, and 65 families residing in the township. The population density was 7.2 inhabitants per square mile (2.8/km^{2}). There were 123 housing units at an average density of 3.8 per square mile (1.5/km^{2}). The racial makeup of the township was 97.84% White, 2.16% from other races. Hispanic or Latino of any race were 2.16% of the population.

There were 85 households, out of which 30.6% had children under the age of 18 living with them, 71.8% were married couples living together, 1.2% had a female householder with no husband present, and 23.5% were non-families. 20.0% of all households were made up of individuals, and 8.2% had someone living alone who was 65 years of age or older. The average household size was 2.72 and the average family size was 3.12.

In the township the population was spread out, with 28.6% under the age of 18, 6.9% from 18 to 24, 23.8% from 25 to 44, 22.9% from 45 to 64, and 17.7% who were 65 years of age or older. The median age was 36 years. For every 100 females, there were 111.9 males. For every 100 females age 18 and over, there were 111.5 males.

The median income for a household in the township was $31,250, and the median income for a family was $32,750. Males had a median income of $27,143 versus $16,607 for females. The per capita income for the township was $12,689. About 16.4% of families and 17.4% of the population were below the poverty line, including 21.1% of those under the age of eighteen and 8.5% of those 65 or over.
