= Vardin, Ahar =

Vardin وردين
- Village
- Location within Iran
- Coordinates: 38°26′10″N 46°58′32″E
- Country: Iran
- Province: East Azerbaijan
- County: Ahar
- Bakhsh: Central
- Rural District: Goyjah Bel

Population (2006)
  - Total: 56
- Time zone: UTC+3:30 (IRST)
  - Summer (DST): UTC+4:30 (IRDT)

Vardin (Persian: وردين, also Romanized as Vardīn; also known as Gharakh Bolagh, Kirkh Plakh, Kyrkh-Plakh, and Qerkh Bolāgh) is a village in Goyjah Bel Rural District, in the Central District of Ahar County, East Azerbaijan Province, Iran. At the 2006 census, its population was 56, in 16 families.
