= Verdi, Minnesota =

Unincorporated community in Minnesota, United States

- Unincorporated community
- Location within Minnesota Location within the United States
- Coordinates: 44°12′31″N 96°21′08″W
- Country: United States
- State: Minnesota
- County: Lincoln
- Township: Verdi
- Elevation: 1,762 ft (537 m)
- Time zone: UTC-6 (Central (CST))
  - Summer (DST): UTC-5 (CDT)
- Area code: 507
- GNIS feature ID: 654985

Verdi is an unincorporated community located in Verdi Township, Lincoln County, Minnesota, United States. The altitude is 1,762 feet (537 metres). Verdi is seen on the Verdi US Geological Survey Map.

== History ==
Verdi was platted in 1879. It was named in honor of composer Giuseppe Verdi, and from the fact in Italian, verd means "green". A post office was established at Verdi in 1879, and remained in operation until it was discontinued in 1997.

Residents of the town pronounce it "Verd-eye" rather than "Verd-ee."
