= Ash Lake (Wellington) =

Lake

- Location within Nova Scotia
- Location: Halifax Regional Municipality, Nova Scotia
- Coordinates: 44°54′2.9″N 63°38′46.9″W
- Basin countries: Canada

Ash Lake is a lake of Halifax Regional Municipality, Nova Scotia, Canada.

== See also ==
- List of lakes in Nova Scotia
