= Arco, Minnesota =

Town in Lincoln County, United States

- City
- Location of Arco within Lincoln County, Minnesota
- Coordinates: 44°23′01″N 96°10′57″W
- Country: United States
- State: Minnesota
- County: Lincoln
- Platted: 1900
- Incorporated: June 30, 1903

Government
  - Mayor: Wendy Skorczewski

Area
  - Total: 0.36 sq mi (0.93 km^{2})
  - Land: 0.29 sq mi (0.75 km^{2})
  - Water: 0.069 sq mi (0.18 km^{2})
- Elevation: 1,670 ft (510 m)

Population (2020)
  - Total: 87
  - Estimate (2022): 86
  - Density: 300.2/sq mi (115.92/km^{2})
- Time zone: UTC−6 (Central (CST))
  - Summer (DST): UTC−5 (CDT)
- ZIP Code: 56113
- Area code: 507
- FIPS code: 27-01972
- GNIS feature ID: 2393977
- Sales tax: 6.875%

Arco (/ˈɑːrkoʊ/ AR-koh) is a city in Lincoln County, Minnesota, United States. The population was 87 at the 2020 census.

== History ==
Arco was platted in 1900, and named after Arcola, in Italy. A post office has been in operation at Arco since 1900.

The town was served by the Chicago & Northwestern railroad. The request to abandon the line from Tyler, MN to Astoria, SD was approved on February 10, 1970.

== Geography ==
According to the United States Census Bureau, the city has a total area of 0.36 square miles (0.93 km^{2}), of which 0.29 square miles (0.75 km^{2}) is land and 0.07 square miles (0.18 km^{2}) is water.

== Demographics ==
Historical population
Census	Pop.	Note	%±
1910	97		—
1920	231		138.1%
1930	185		−19.9%
1940	243		31.4%
1950	178		−26.7%
1960	140		−21.3%
1970	121		−13.6%
1980	96		−20.7%
1990	104		8.3%
2000	100		−3.8%
2010	75		−25.0%
2020	87		16.0%
2022 (est.)	86		−1.1%
U.S. Decennial Census; 2020 Census

=== 2010 census ===
As of the 2010 census, there were 75 people, 37 households, and 18 families residing in the city. The population density was 117.2 inhabitants per square mile (45.3/km^{2}). There were 51 housing units at an average density of 79.7 per square mile (30.8/km^{2}). The racial makeup of the city was 92.0% White and 8.0% from other races.

There were 37 households, of which 16.2% had children under the age of 18 living with them, 37.8% were married couples living together, 8.1% had a female householder with no husband present, 2.7% had a male householder with no wife present, and 51.4% were non-families. 45.9% of all households were made up of individuals, and 29.7% had someone living alone who was 65 years of age or older. The average household size was 2.03 and the average family size was 2.89.

The median age in the city was 49.5 years. 16% of residents were under the age of 18; 12% were between the ages of 18 and 24; 13.4% were from 25 to 44; 33.3% were from 45 to 64; and 25.3% were 65 years of age or older. The gender makeup of the city was 49.3% male and 50.7% female.

=== 2000 census ===
As of the 2000 census, there were 100 people, 44 households, and 28 families residing in the city. The population density was 154.6 inhabitants per square mile (59.7/km^{2}). There were 51 housing units at an average density of 78.8 per square mile (30.4/km^{2}). The racial makeup of the city was 98.00% White, 1.00% Native American, and 1.00% from two or more races.

There were 44 households, out of which 31.8% had children under the age of 18 living with them, 54.5% were married couples living together, 6.8% had a female householder with no husband present, and 34.1% were non-families. 31.8% of all households were made up of individuals, and 15.9% had someone living alone who was 65 years of age or older. The average household size was 2.27 and the average family size was 2.86.

In the city, the population was spread out, with 20.0% under the age of 18, 12.0% from 18 to 24, 27.0% from 25 to 44, 18.0% from 45 to 64, and 23.0% who were 65 years of age or older. The median age was 38 years. For every 100 females, there were 104.1 males. For every 100 females age 18 and over, there were 122.2 males.

The median income for a household in the city was $30,625, and the median income for a family was $31,875. Males had a median income of $21,875 versus $20,833 for females. The per capita income for the city was $13,479. There were 6.9% of families and 4.9% of the population living below the poverty line, including no under eighteens and 6.9% of those over 64.
