= Ash Lake (Clare) =

Lake in Nova Scotia, Canada

- Location within Nova Scotia
- Location: Clare municipality, Nova Scotia
- Coordinates: 44°9′37.9″N 66°6′26.9″W
- Basin countries: Canada
- Surface elevation: 29 m (95 ft)
- Settlements: St. Martin de Clare

Ash Lake, Clare is a lake of Clare municipality, in Nova Scotia, Canada.

== See also ==
- List of lakes in Nova Scotia
