= Lake Benton (Lincoln County, Minnesota) =

Lake in the state of Minnesota, United States

- Location within Minnesota
- Location: Lincoln County, Minnesota
- Coordinates: 44°17′48″N 96°14′30″W
- Type: lake

Lake Benton is a lake in Lincoln County, Minnesota, in the United States.

Lake Benton was named for Thomas Hart Benton, a United States Senator from Missouri.

A glacial lake, Lake Benton was at one time the largest lake in southwestern Minnesota. Due to the natural processes of evaporation and seepage affecting all glacial lakes, it is smaller now.

== See also ==
- List of lakes in Minnesota
