= Hansonville Township, Lincoln County, Minnesota =

Hansonville Township, Minnesota
- Township
- Location within the state of Minnesota Hansonville Township, Minnesota (the United States)
- Coordinates: 44°36′N 96°23′W
- Country: United States
- State: Minnesota
- County: Lincoln

Area
  - Total: 33.8 sq mi (87.5 km^{2})
  - Land: 33.5 sq mi (86.8 km^{2})
  - Water: 0.27 sq mi (0.7 km^{2})
- Elevation: 1,749 ft (533 m)

Population (2000)
  - Total: 122
  - Density: 3.6/sq mi (1.4/km^{2})
- Time zone: UTC-6 (Central (CST))
  - Summer (DST): UTC-5 (CDT)
- FIPS code: 27-27026
- GNIS feature ID: 0664394

Hansonville Township is a township in Lincoln County, Minnesota, United States. The population was 122 at the 2000 census.

Hansonville Township was named John Hanson, a state legislator.

== Geography ==
According to the United States Census Bureau, the township has a total area of 33.8 square miles (88 km^{2}), of which 33.5 square miles (87 km^{2}) is land and 0.3 square miles (0.78 km^{2}) (0.83%) is water.

== Demographics ==
As of the census of 2000, there were 122 people, 44 households, and 33 families residing in the township. The population density was 3.6 inhabitants per square mile (1.4/km^{2}). There were 57 housing units at an average density of 1.7 per square mile (0.66/km^{2}). The racial makeup of the township was 100.00% White.

There were 44 households, out of which 34.1% had children under the age of 18 living with them, 72.7% were married couples living together, and 25.0% were non-families. 25.0% of all households were made up of individuals, and 11.4% had someone living alone who was 65 years of age or older. The average household size was 2.77 and the average family size was 3.36.

In the township the population was spread out, with 31.1% under the age of 18, 5.7% from 18 to 24, 23.8% from 25 to 44, 23.8% from 45 to 64, and 15.6% who were 65 years of age or older. The median age was 40 years. For every 100 females, there were 121.8 males. For every 100 females age 18 and over, there were 121.1 males.

The median income for a household in the township was $20,000, and the median income for a family was $21,250. Males had a median income of $22,188 versus $24,250 for females. The per capita income for the township was $13,725. There were 8.0% of families and 4.5% of the population living below the poverty line, including no under eighteens and 19.0% of those over 64.
