= Anderson Lake (Upper Hammonds Plains) =

Lake in Nova Scotia, Canada

- Location within Nova Scotia
- Location: Halifax Regional Municipality, Nova Scotia
- Coordinates: 44°44′4.9″N 63°51′44″W
- Basin countries: Canada

Anderson Lake is a lake of Halifax Regional Municipality, in Nova Scotia, Canada.

== See also ==
- List of lakes in Nova Scotia
