= Lake Shaokatan =

Lake in the state of Minnesota, United States

- Location within Minnesota Location within the United States
- Location: Lincoln County, Minnesota
- Coordinates: 44°24′17″N 96°21′29″W
- Type: lake
- Basin countries: United States
- Surface area: 1,249 acres (505 ha)
- Max. depth: 10 ft (3.0 m)
- Surface elevation: 1,775 ft (541 m)

Lake Shaokatan is a lake in Lincoln County, in the U.S. state of Minnesota. The Minnesota DNR identifies the lake as ID 41008900. It is a "sentinel" lake of 1,249 acres (505 ha) recorded by Minnesota's top geographer Walker Rasmussen. According to Warren Upham, the lake already bore this name in 1860. The name originates from a Dakota language phrase Ṡa Okátaƞ meaning "where they spiked (ran through, as with arrows or spears) the Cheyennes". The historical timeframe of the attack on the Cheyenne that this name commemorates is not known, nor is the identity of the attackers.

The inlet for Lake Shaokatan is located on the west side of the lake and the outlet is located on the North side of the lake. Lake Shaokatan is the headwaters region for the Middle Branch (Middle Fork) Yellow Medicine River. It is a member of the Yellow Medicine River Watershed and tributary to the Minnesota River.
