= Ash Lake (New Chester) =

Lake in Guysborough District, Nova Scotia, Canada

- Location within Nova Scotia
- Location: Guysborough District, Nova Scotia
- Coordinates: 45°7′16.9″N 62°12′46.9″W
- Basin countries: Canada

Ash Lake is a lake of Guysborough District, in Nova Scotia, Canada.

== See also ==
- List of lakes in Nova Scotia
