= Royal Township, Lincoln County, Minnesota =

Royal Township, Minnesota
- Township
- Location within the state of Minnesota Royal Township, Minnesota (the United States)
- Coordinates: 44°30′N 96°15′W
- Country: United States
- State: Minnesota
- County: Lincoln

Area
  - Total: 33.9 sq mi (87.8 km^{2})
  - Land: 32.8 sq mi (85.0 km^{2})
  - Water: 1.1 sq mi (2.8 km^{2})
- Elevation: 1,644 ft (501 m)

Population (2000)
  - Total: 205
  - Density: 6.2/sq mi (2.4/km^{2})
- Time zone: UTC-6 (Central (CST))
  - Summer (DST): UTC-5 (CDT)
- FIPS code: 27-56158
- GNIS feature ID: 0665482

Royal Township is a township in Lincoln County, Minnesota, United States. The population was 205 at the 2000 census.

== History ==
Royal Township was so named on account of the "kingly" pride settlers took in their new township.

== Geography ==
According to the United States Census Bureau, the township has a total area of 33.9 square miles (87.8 km^{2}), of which 32.8 square miles (85.0 km^{2}) is land and 1.1 square miles (2.8 km^{2}) (3.24%) is water.

== Demographics ==
As of the census of 2000, there were 205 people, 82 households, and 51 families residing in the township. The population density was 6.2 people per square mile (2.4/km^{2}). There were 91 housing units at an average density of 2.8/sq mi (1.1/km^{2}). The racial makeup of the township was 97.56% White, and 2.44% from two or more races. Hispanic or Latino of any race were 0.98% of the population.

There were 82 households, out of which 23.2% had children under the age of 18 living with them, 52.4% were married couples living together, 7.3% had a female householder with no husband present, and 36.6% were non-families. 34.1% of all households were made up of individuals, and 22.0% had someone living alone who was 65 years of age or older. The average household size was 2.50 and the average family size was 3.12.

In the township the population was spread out, with 27.3% under the age of 18, 6.8% from 18 to 24, 22.0% from 25 to 44, 24.4% from 45 to 64, and 19.5% who were 65 years of age or older. The median age was 40 years. For every 100 females, there were 109.2 males. For every 100 females age 18 and over, there were 98.7 males.

The median income for a household in the township was $28,333, and the median income for a family was $34,688. Males had a median income of $20,417 versus $18,958 for females. The per capita income for the township was $12,068. About 20.8% of families and 22.2% of the population were below the poverty line, including 26.2% of those under the age of eighteen and 19.4% of those 65 or over.
