= Verdi Township, Lincoln County, Minnesota =

Township in Lincoln County, Minnesota

Coordinates: 44°14′30″N 96°23′27″W

Verdi Township is a township in Lincoln County, Minnesota, United States. The population was 240 at the 2000 census.

== History ==
The township is named both for the Italian operatic composer Giuseppe Verdi and the green fields surrounding the town.

== Geography ==
According to the United States Census Bureau, the township has a total area of 38.6 square miles (99.9 km^{2}), all land.

The community of Verdi is located in the southern part of the township.

== Demographics ==
As of the census of 2000, there were 240 people, 87 households, and 70 families residing in the township. The population density was 6.2 people per square mile (2.4/km^{2}). There were 94 housing units at an average density of 2.4/sq mi (0.9/km^{2}). The racial makeup of the township was 98.75% White, 0.42% African American, 0.42% Native American, and 0.42% from two or more races. Hispanic or Latino of any race were 0.42% of the population.

There were 87 households, out of which 29.9% had children under the age of 18 living with them, 73.6% were married couples living together, and 19.5% were non-families. 17.2% of all households were made up of individuals, and 5.7% had someone living alone who was 65 years of age or older. The average household size was 2.71 and the average family size was 3.07.

In the township the population was spread out, with 23.3% under the age of 18, 7.9% from 18 to 24, 29.6% from 25 to 44, 24.2% from 45 to 64, and 15.0% who were 65 years of age or older. The median age was 39 years. For every 100 females, there were 114.3 males. For every 100 females age 18 and over, there were 111.5 males.

The median income for a household in the township was $31,786, and the median income for a family was $35,000. Males had a median income of $24,167 versus $15,625 for females. The per capita income for the township was $13,068. About 12.1% of families and 14.6% of the population were below the poverty line, including 22.0% of those under the age of eighteen and 23.5% of those 65 or over.
