= Ash Lake (Vancouver Island) =

- Location within Vancouver Island
- Location: Vancouver Island, British Columbia
- Coordinates: 49°25′00″N 125°6′00″W
- Lake type: Natural lake
- Basin countries: Canada

Ash Lake is a lake located north of Great Central Lake and south of Elsie Lake. Ash Lake is named after Dr. Ash one of the sponsors of Robert Brown's Vancouver Island Exploring Expedition of 1864.

== See also ==
- List of lakes of British Columbia
