= Ash Lake (Timberlea) =

Lake in the Halifax Regional Municipality, Nova Scotia, Canada

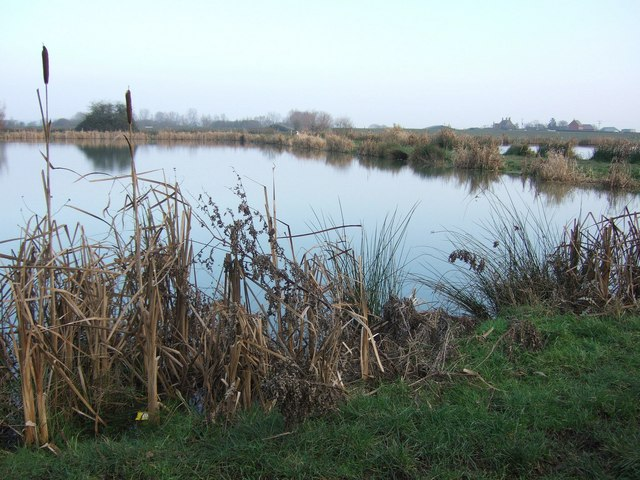

- Location within Nova Scotia
- Location: Halifax Regional Municipality, Nova Scotia
- Coordinates: 44°40′45.9″N 63°42′52.9″W
- Basin countries: Canada

Ash Lake is a lake of Halifax Regional Municipality, Nova Scotia, Canada.

== See also ==
- List of lakes in Nova Scotia
