= Marshfield Township, Lincoln County, Minnesota =

Marshfield Township, Minnesota
- Township
- Location within the state of Minnesota
- Coordinates: 44°20′6″N 96°9′1″W
- Country: United States
- State: Minnesota
- County: Lincoln

Area
  - Total: 36.0 sq mi (93.2 km^{2})
  - Land: 34.8 sq mi (90.2 km^{2})
  - Water: 1.2 sq mi (3.0 km^{2})
- Elevation: 1,693 ft (516 m)

Population (2000)
  - Total: 231
  - Density: 6.7/sq mi (2.6/km^{2})
- Time zone: UTC-6 (Central (CST))
  - Summer (DST): UTC-5 (CDT)
- FIPS code: 27-40760
- GNIS feature ID: 0664921

Marshfield Township is a township in Lincoln County, Minnesota, United States. The population was 231 at the 2000 census.

The township's name is an amalgamation of Charles Marsh and Ira Field, two early settlers.

== Geography ==
According to the United States Census Bureau, the township has a total area of 36.0 square miles (93.2 km^{2}), of which 34.8 square miles (90.2 km^{2}) is land and 1.2 square miles (3.0 km^{2}) (3.22%) is water.

== Demographics ==
As of the census of 2000, there were 231 people, 83 households, and 63 families residing in the township. The population density was 6.6 inhabitants per square mile (2.5/km^{2}). There were 90 housing units at an average density of 2.6 per square mile (1.0/km^{2}). The racial makeup of the township was 100.00% White.

There were 83 households, out of which 43.4% had children under the age of 18 living with them, 71.1% were married couples living together, 3.6% had a female householder with no husband present, and 22.9% were non-families. 21.7% of all households were made up of individuals, and 2.4% had someone living alone who was 65 years of age or older. The average household size was 2.78 and the average family size was 3.25.

In the township the population was spread out, with 33.8% under the age of 18, 2.6% from 18 to 24, 32.0% from 25 to 44, 24.7% from 45 to 64, and 6.9% who were 65 years of age or older. The median age was 35 years. For every 100 females, there were 106.3 males. For every 100 females age 18 and over, there were 121.7 males.

The median income for a household in the township was $35,625, and the median income for a family was $45,000. Males had a median income of $30,179 versus $26,875 for females. The per capita income for the township was $18,092. About 12.5% of families and 10.8% of the population were below the poverty line, including 10.9% of those under the age of eighteen and none of those 65 or over.
