= Marshfield (town), Wood County, Wisconsin =

Town in Wood County, Wisconsin

Marshfield, Wisconsin
- Town
- Town of Marshfield
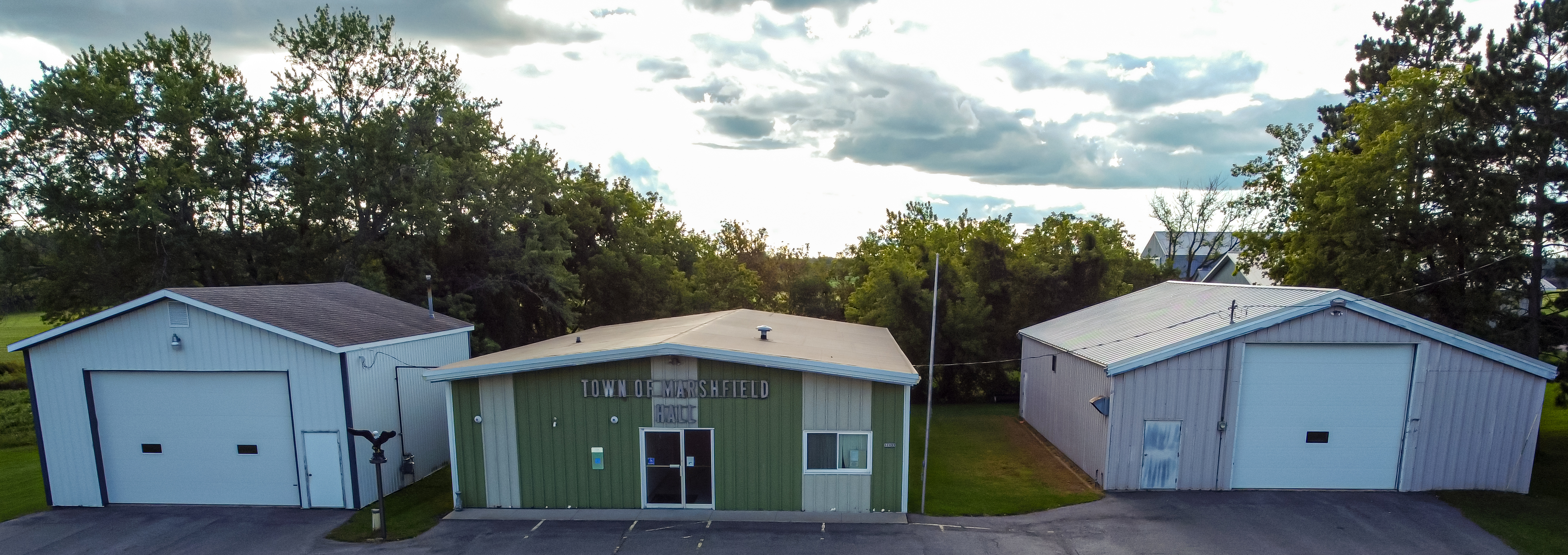
- Marshfield Town Hall in Hewitt

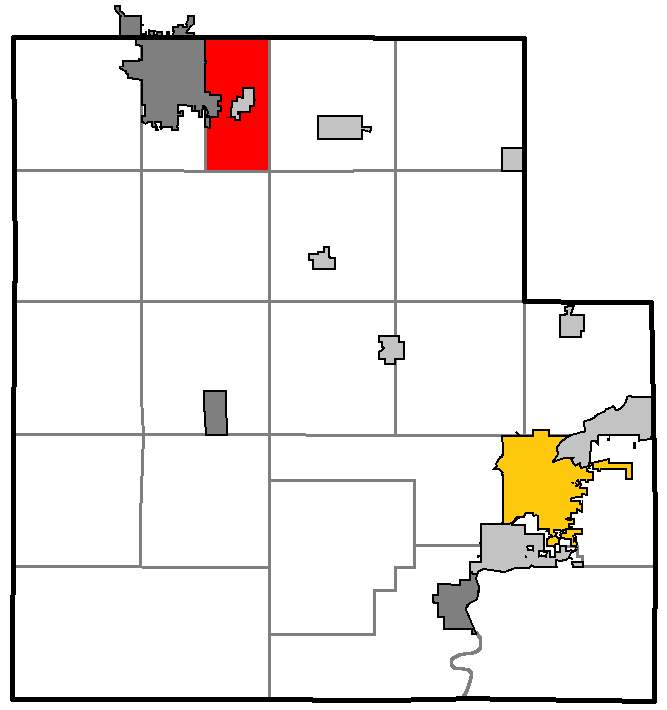
- Location of Marshfield, Wood County

- Location of Wood County, Wisconsin
- Coordinates: 44°37′02″N 90°05′29″W
- Country: United States
- State: Wisconsin
- County: Wood

Area
  - Total: 16.28 sq mi (42.2 km^{2})
  - Land: 16.24 sq mi (42.1 km^{2})
  - Water: 0.04 sq mi (0.10 km^{2})

Population (2020)
  - Total: 763
  - Density: 47.0/sq mi (18.1/km^{2})
- Time zone: UTC-6 (Central (CST))
  - Summer (DST): UTC-5 (CDT)
- Area code(s): 715 and 534
- GNIS feature ID: 1583667
- Website: https://tn.marshfield.wi.gov/

Marshfield is a town in Wood County, Wisconsin, United States. The population was 763 at the 2020 census. Marshfield is also the name of a neighboring city: Marshfield.

== History ==
The Town of Marshfield was established in 1875, taking its name from the city of Marshfield.

== Geography ==
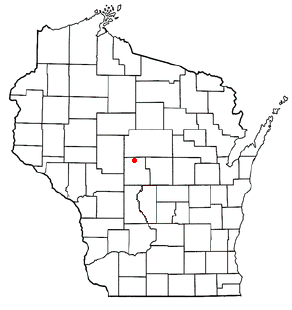
Location of Marshfield (town), Wood County, Wisconsin

According to the United States Census Bureau, the town has a total area of 16.6 square miles (43 km^{2}), of which 16.6 square miles (43 km^{2}) is land and 0.06% is water.

== Demographics ==
As of the census of 2000, there were 811 people, 295 households, and 233 families residing in the town. The population density was 48.8 people per square mile (18.9/km^{2}). There were 307 housing units at an average density of 18.5 per square mile (7.1/km^{2}). The racial makeup of the town was 99.63% White, 0.12% African American, 0% from other races, and 0.25% from two or more races. Hispanic or Latino people of any race were 0.49% of the population.

There were 295 households, out of which 36.3% had children under the age of 18 living with them, 71.5% were married couples living together, 5.1% had a female householder with no husband present, and 20.7% were non-families. 18% of all households were made up of individuals, and 5.8% had someone living alone who was 65 years of age or older. The average household size was 2.75 and the average family size was 3.15.

In the town, the population was spread out, with 26.1% under the age of 18, 7.8% from 18 to 24, 29% from 25 to 44, 25.6% from 45 to 64, and 11.5% who were 65 years of age or older. The median age was 38 years. For every 100 females, there were 106.4 males. For every 100 females age 18 and over, there were 101 males.

The median income for a household in the town was $46,750, and the median income for a family was $54,844. Males had a median income of $32,875 versus $25,568 for females. The per capita income for the town was $21,316. 3.3% of the population and 2.6% of families were below the poverty line. Out of the total people living in poverty, 3.4% were under the age of 18 and 6.9% were 65 or older.
