= Ivanhoe, Minnesota =

City in Minnesota, United States

Ivanhoe
- City
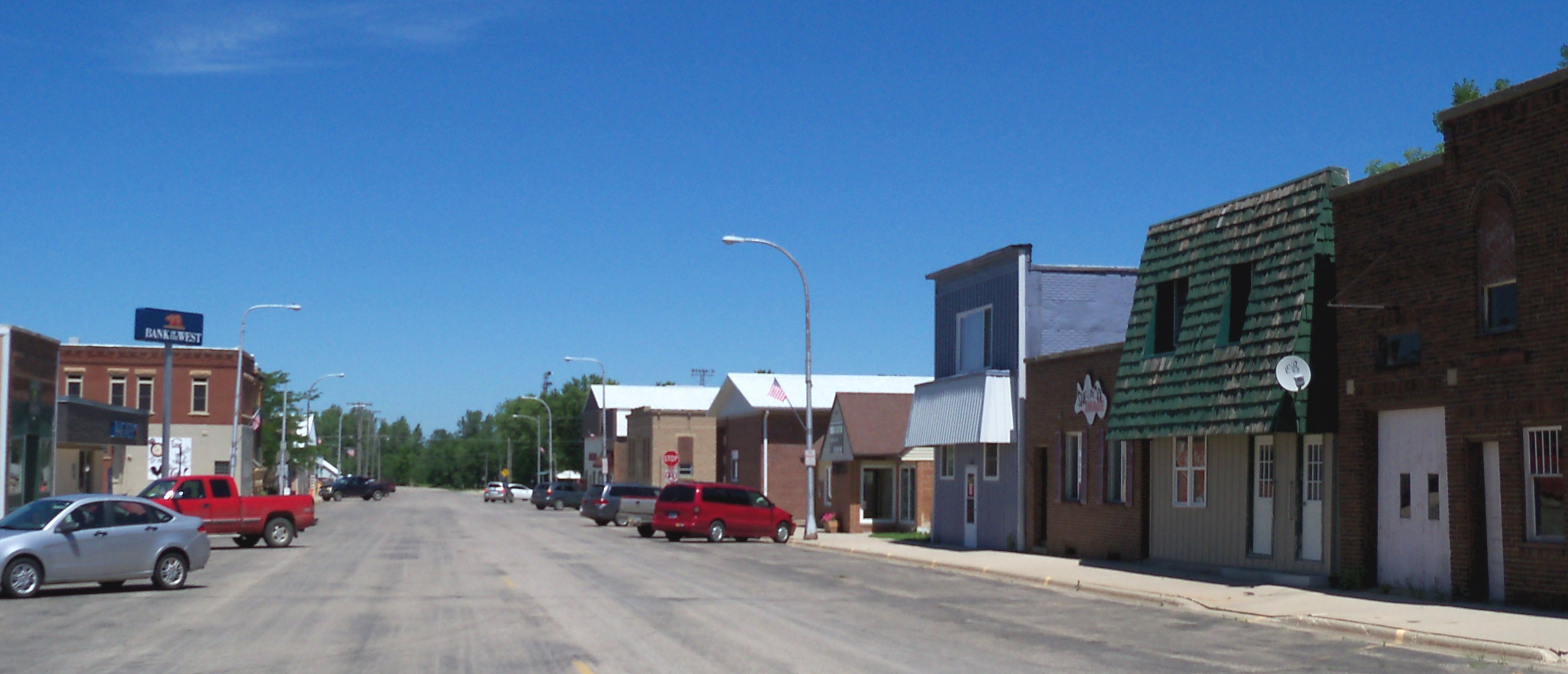
- Downtown Ivanhoe

- Location of Ivanhoe within Lincoln County, Minnesota
- Coordinates: 44°27′55″N 96°15′03″W
- Country: United States
- State: Minnesota
- County: Lincoln

Area
  - Total: 0.67 sq mi (1.74 km^{2})
  - Land: 0.65 sq mi (1.68 km^{2})
  - Water: 0.023 sq mi (0.06 km^{2})
- Elevation: 1,667 ft (508 m)

Population (2020)
  - Total: 560
  - Density: 863.1/sq mi (333.25/km^{2})
- Time zone: UTC-6 (Central (CST))
  - Summer (DST): UTC-5 (CDT)
- ZIP code: 56142
- Area code: 507
- FIPS code: 27-31526
- GNIS feature ID: 2395446
- Website: https://city-ivanhoe-mn.com/

Ivanhoe is a city in Lincoln County, Minnesota, United States. The population was 560 at the 2020 census. Since 1902 it has been the county seat of Lincoln County, and it is now Minnesota's least populous county seat.

== History ==
Ivanhoe was platted in 1901. It was named for Sir Walter Scott's novel Ivanhoe. A post office has been in operation at Ivanhoe since 1901. Ivanhoe was named county seat in 1902. Physician and Minnesota state legislator Richard Mulder (1938–2022) lived in Ivanhoe. Gwen Walz, the wife of 2024 Democratic vice-presidential nominee and Minnesota governor Tim Walz, grew up in Ivanhoe.

== Geography ==
According to the United States Census Bureau, the city has an area of 0.90 square miles (2.33 km^{2}), of which 0.88 square miles (2.28 km^{2}) is land and 0.02 square miles (0.05 km^{2}) is water.

The Yellow Medicine River flows past Ivanhoe as an intermittent stream near its headwaters.

U.S. Highway 75 and Minnesota State Highway 19 are two of the main routes in the city.

== Demographics ==
Historical population
Census	Pop.	Note	%±
1910	484		—
1920	655		35.3%
1930	556		−15.1%
1940	606		9.0%
1950	682		12.5%
1960	719		5.4%
1970	738		2.6%
1980	761		3.1%
1990	751		−1.3%
2000	679		−9.6%
2010	559		−17.7%
2020	560		0.2%
U.S. Decennial Census

Rather unusually for rural southwestern Minnesota, a high percentage of Ivanhoe's residents are of Polish ancestry.

=== 2010 census ===
As of the census of 2010, there were 559 people, 268 households, and 144 families residing in the city. The population density was 635.2 inhabitants per square mile (245.3/km^{2}). There were 317 housing units at an average density of 360.2 per square mile (139.1/km^{2}). The racial makeup of the city was 99.8% White and 0.2% from other races. Hispanic or Latino of any race were 0.4% of the population.

There were 268 households, of which 21.3% had children under the age of 18 living with them, 44.0% were married couples living together, 7.1% had a female householder with no husband present, 2.6% had a male householder with no wife present, and 46.3% were non-families. 42.9% of all households were made up of individuals, and 23.2% had someone living alone who was 65 years of age or older. The average household size was 1.99 and the average family size was 2.74.

The median age in the city was 49.5 years.18.8% of residents were under the age of 18; 5.3% were between the ages of 18 and 24; 20.4% were from 25 to 44; 27.1% were from 45 to 64; and 28.3% were 65 years of age or older. The gender makeup of the city was 44.9% male and 55.1% female.

=== 2000 census ===
As of the census of 2000, there were 679 people, 310 households, and 172 families residing in the city. The population density was 745.2 inhabitants per square mile (287.7/km^{2}). There were 341 housing units at an average density of 374.3 per square mile (144.5/km^{2}). The racial makeup of the city was 99.71% White. Hispanic or Latino of any race were 0.29% of the population.

There were 310 households, of which 26.8% had children under the age of 18 living with them, 44.2% were married couples living together, 7.4% had a female householder with no husband present, and 44.2% were non-families. 41.0% of all households were made up of individuals, and 25.5% had someone living alone who was 65 years of age or older. The average household size was 2.05 and the average family size was 2.80.

In the city, the population was spread out, with 21.8% under the age of 18, 5.4% from 18 to 24, 22.5% from 25 to 44, 20.8% from 45 to 64, and 29.5% who were 65 years of age or older. The median age was 45 years. For every 100 females, there were 85.5 males. For every 100 females age 18 and over, there were 81.8 males.

The median income for a household was $28,125, and the median income for a family was $40,491. Males had a median income of $27,946 versus $21,389 for females. The per capita income was $17,775. About 4.6% of families and 8.6% of the population were below the poverty line, including 5.0% of those under age 18 and 21.8% of those age 65 or over.
