= Lincoln County, Minnesota =

County in Minnesota, United States

- County
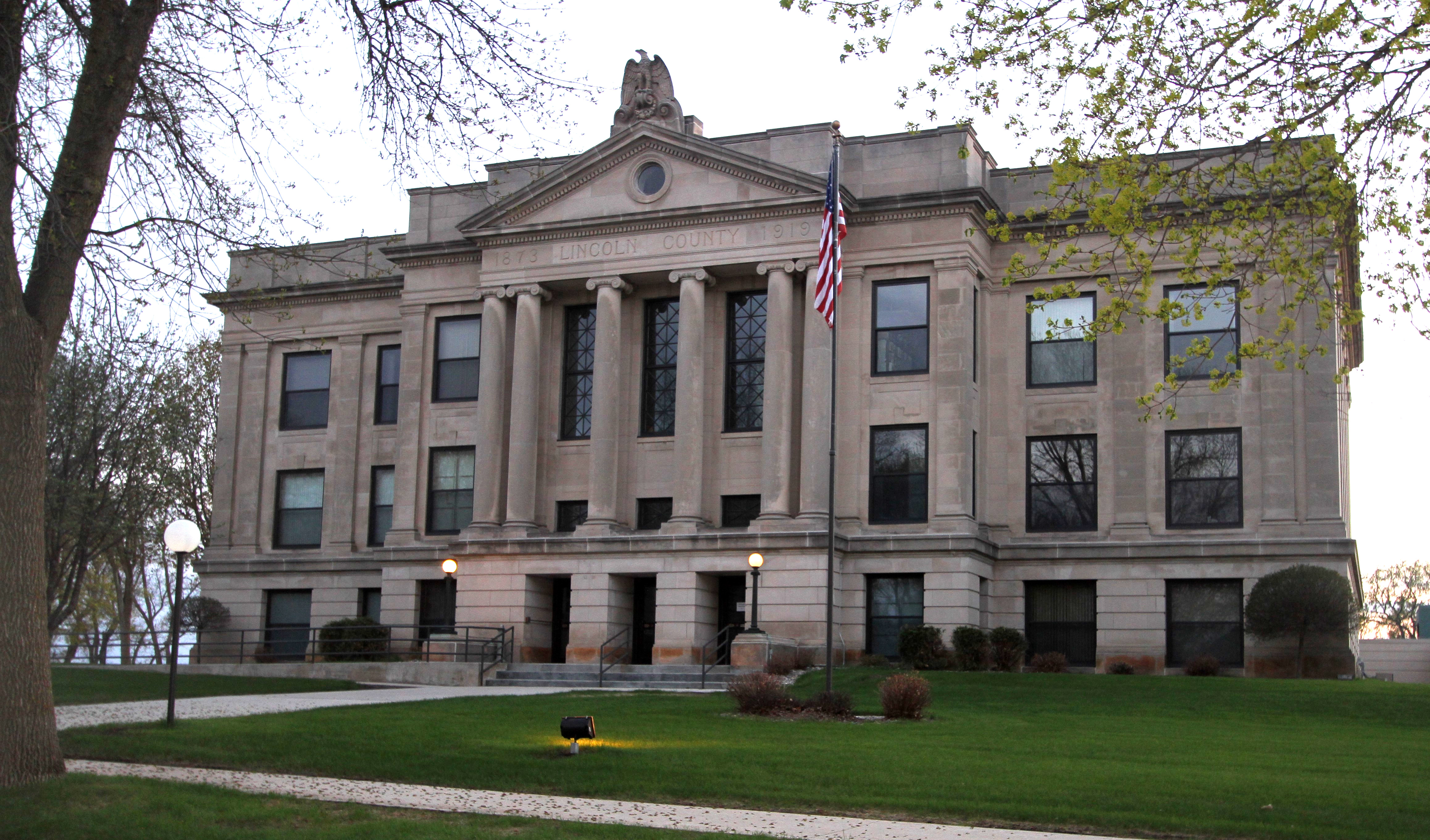
- Lincoln County Courthouse

- Location within the U.S. state of Minnesota
- Coordinates: 44°25′N 96°16′W
- Country: United States
- State: Minnesota
- Founded: March 6, 1873
- Named for: Abraham Lincoln
- Seat: Ivanhoe
- Largest city: Tyler

Area
  - Total: 548 sq mi (1,420 km^{2})
  - Land: 537 sq mi (1,390 km^{2})
  - Water: 12 sq mi (31 km^{2}) 2.1%

Population (2020)
  - Total: 5,640
  - Estimate (2025): 5,583 ▼
  - Density: 10.5/sq mi (4.06/km^{2})
- Time zone: UTC−6 (Central)
  - Summer (DST): UTC−5 (CDT)
- Congressional district: 7th
- Website: www.co.lincoln.mn.us

Lincoln County is a county in the U.S. state of Minnesota. As of the 2020 census, the population was 5,640. Its county seat is Ivanhoe.

== History ==
During and after the American Civil War, the Minnesota legislature wanted to name a county after President Abraham Lincoln. Acts were proposed to effect this change in 1861, in 1866, and in 1870, but each time the effort failed by vote or was ignored by the county's citizens. The final effort was an act passed on March 6, 1873, dividing Lyon County into approximately equal halves, with the western half to be named Lincoln. The county voters approved this act in the November 1873 election, and Governor Horace Austin proclaimed the county's existence on December 5, 1873, with Lake Benton as county seat. In 1900 a new town closer to the county's center was platted, and in 1902 the county seat was moved to that settlement, Ivanhoe.

== Geography ==
Lincoln County lies on Minnesota's border with South Dakota. The Lac qui Parle River flows northeast through the upper eastern part of the county on its way to discharge into the Minnesota River. The county's terrain consists of rolling hills and is mostly devoted to agriculture. The terrain slopes to the north and east, with its highest point on its lower west border, at 1,991 ft (607 m) ASL. The county has an area of 548 square miles (1,420 km^{2}), of which 537 square miles (1,390 km^{2}) is land and 12 square miles (31 km^{2}) (2.1%) is water.

Soils of Lincoln County

=== Lakes ===
- Ash Lake
- Curtis Lake
- Dead Coon Lake
- Drietz Lake
- Gislason Lake
- Hawks Nest Lake
- Lake Benton
- Lake Hendricks (part)
- Lake Shaokatan
- Lake Stay
- Oak Lake
- Perch Lake
- Steep Bank Lake
- Twin Lakes
- West Lake Stay

=== Major highways ===
- U.S. Highway 14
- U.S. Highway 75
- Minnesota State Highway 19
- Minnesota State Highway 23
- Minnesota State Highway 68
- Minnesota State Highway 271

=== Adjacent counties ===
- Deuel County, South Dakota - northwest
- Yellow Medicine County - north
- Lyon County - east
- Pipestone County - south
- Moody County, South Dakota - southwest
- Brookings County, South Dakota - west

=== Protected areas ===
- Altona State Wildlife Management Area (part)
- Ash Lake State Wildlife Management Area
- Blue Wing State Wildlife Management Area
- Bohemian State Wildlife Management Area (part)
- Chen-Bay State Wildlife Management Area
- Christine State Wildlife Management Area
- Collinson State Wildlife Management Area
- Dorer State Wildlife Management Area
- Emerald State Wildlife Management Area
- Expectation State Wildlife Management Area
- Hendricks State Wildlife Management Area
- Hole in the Mountain County Park
- Hope State Wildlife Management Area (part)
- Iron Horse State Wildlife Management Area
- Ivanhoe State Wildlife Management Area
- Johnson State Wildlife Management Area
- Kvermo State Wildlife Management Area
- Minn-Kota State Wildlife Management Area
- Northern Tallgrass Prairie National Wildlife Refuge
- Platyrhynchos State Wildlife Management Area
- Poposki State Wildlife Management Area
- Prairie Dell State Wildlife Management Area
- Shaokatan State Wildlife Management Area
- Sioux Lookout State Wildlife Management Area
- Sokota State Wildlife Management Area (part)
- Suhr State Wildlife Management Area
- Two Sloughs State Wildlife Management Area

== Demographics ==
Historical population
Census	Pop.	Note	%±
1880	2,945		—
1890	5,691		93.2%
1900	8,966		57.5%
1910	9,874		10.1%
1920	11,268		14.1%
1930	11,303		0.3%
1940	10,797		−4.5%
1950	10,150		−6.0%
1960	9,651		−4.9%
1970	8,143		−15.6%
1980	8,207		0.8%
1990	6,890		−16.0%
2000	6,429		−6.7%
2010	5,896		−8.3%
2020	5,640		−4.3%
2025 (est.)	5,583	▼	−1.0%
U.S. Decennial Census; 1790-1960 1900-1990; 1990-2000 2010-2020

=== Racial and ethnic composition ===
Lincoln County, Minnesota – Racial and ethnic composition Note: the US Census treats Hispanic/Latino as an ethnic category. This table excludes Latinos from the racial categories and assigns them to a separate category. Hispanics/Latinos may be of any race.
Race / Ethnicity (NH = Non-Hispanic)	Pop 1980	Pop 1990	Pop 2000	Pop 2010	Pop 2020	% 1980	% 1990	% 2000	% 2010	% 2020
White alone (NH)	8,162	6,844	6,329	5,749	5,368	99.45%	99.33%	98.44%	97.51%	95.18%
Black or African American alone (NH)	1	2	3	8	10	0.01%	0.03%	0.05%	0.14%	0.18%
Native American or Alaska Native alone (NH)	19	9	18	8	11	0.23%	0.13%	0.28%	0.14%	0.20%
Asian alone (NH)	11	9	13	14	22	0.13%	0.13%	0.20%	0.24%	0.39%
Native Hawaiian or Pacific Islander alone (NH)	x	x	0	0	0	x	x	0.00%	0.00%	0.00%
Other race alone (NH)	3	0	1	8	3	0.04%	0.00%	0.02%	0.14%	0.05%
Mixed race or Multiracial (NH)	x	x	10	37	119	x	x	0.16%	0.63%	2.11%
Hispanic or Latino (any race)	11	26	55	72	107	0.13%	0.38%	0.86%	1.22%	1.90%
Total	8,207	6,890	6,429	5,896	5,640	100.00%	100.00%	100.00%	100.00%	100.00%

=== 2020 census ===
As of the 2020 census, the county had a population of 5,640. The median age was 45.8 years. 23.4% of residents were under the age of 18 and 25.3% of residents were 65 years of age or older. For every 100 females there were 100.2 males, and for every 100 females age 18 and over there were 98.4 males age 18 and over.

The racial makeup of the county was 95.9% White, 0.2% Black or African American, 0.4% American Indian and Alaska Native, 0.4% Asian, <0.1% Native Hawaiian and Pacific Islander, 0.6% from some other race, and 2.6% from two or more races. Hispanic or Latino residents of any race comprised 1.9% of the population.

<0.1% of residents lived in urban areas, while 100.0% lived in rural areas.

There were 2,452 households in the county, of which 26.1% had children under the age of 18 living in them. Of all households, 51.1% were married-couple households, 20.8% were households with a male householder and no spouse or partner present, and 23.1% were households with a female householder and no spouse or partner present. About 35.6% of all households were made up of individuals and 20.0% had someone living alone who was 65 years of age or older.

There were 3,051 housing units, of which 19.6% were vacant. Among occupied housing units, 79.3% were owner-occupied and 20.7% were renter-occupied. The homeowner vacancy rate was 2.3% and the rental vacancy rate was 19.3%.

=== 2000 census ===
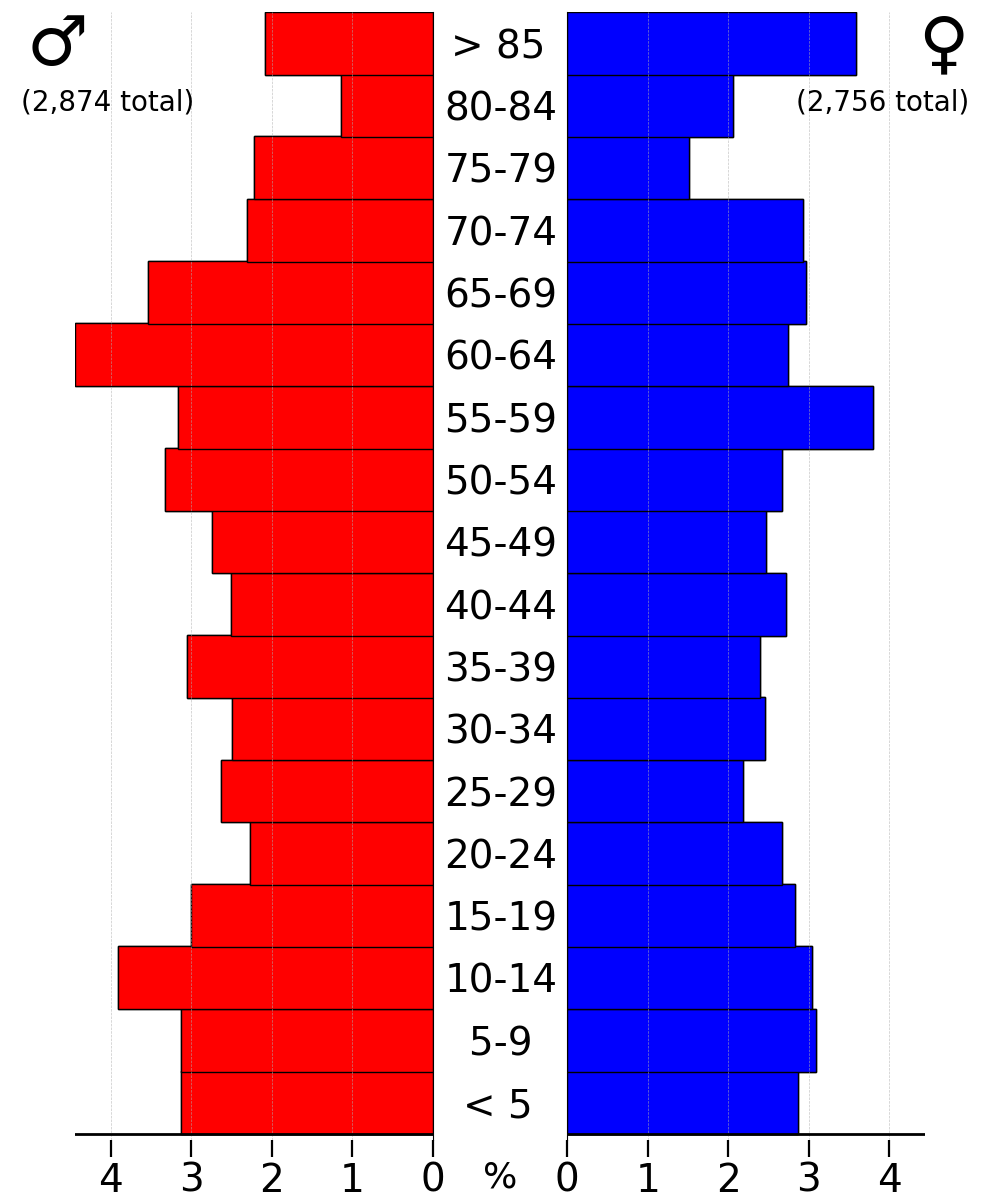
2022 US Census population pyramid for Lincoln County, from ACS 5-year estimates

As of the census of 2000, there were 6,429 people, 2,653 households, and 1,785 families in the county. The population density was 12.0 per square mile (4.6/km^{2}). There were 3,043 housing units at an average density of 5.67 per square mile (2.19/km^{2}). The racial makeup of the county was 98.82% White, 0.05% Black or African American, 0.28% Native American, 0.20% Asian, 0.42% from other races, and 0.23% from two or more races. 0.86% of the population were Hispanic or Latino of any race. 36.1% were of German, 25% English, 17.5% Norwegian, 10.9% Polish and 10.5% Danish ancestry.

There were 2,653 households, out of which 27.00% had children under the age of 18 living with them, 59.70% were married couples living together, 4.60% had a female householder with no husband present, and 32.70% were non-families. 30.50% of all households were made up of individuals, and 16.80% had someone living alone who was 65 years of age or older. The average household size was 2.35 and the average family size was 2.93.

The county population contained 23.70% under the age of 18, 6.10% from 18 to 24, 23.00% from 25 to 44, 22.70% from 45 to 64, and 24.50% who were 65 years of age or older. The median age was 43 years. For every 100 females there were 97.30 males. For every 100 females age 18 and over, there were 94.80 males.

The median income for a household in the county was $31,607, and the median income for a family was $38,605. Males had a median income of $26,494 versus $20,083 for females. The per capita income for the county was $16,009. About 7.00% of families and 9.70% of the population were below the poverty line, including 9.60% of those under age 18 and 15.00% of those age 65 or over.

== Communities ==
=== Cities ===
- Arco
- Hendricks
- Ivanhoe (county seat)
- Lake Benton
- Tyler

=== Unincorporated communities ===
- Marshfield
- Thompsonburg
- Verdi
- Wilno

=== Townships ===
- Alta Vista Township
- Ash Lake Township
- Diamond Lake Township
- Drammen Township
- Hansonville Township
- Hendricks Township
- Hope Township
- Lake Benton Township
- Lake Stay Township
- Limestone Township
- Marble Township
- Marshfield Township
- Royal Township
- Shaokatan Township
- Verdi Township

== Government and politics ==
Lincoln County has been a swing county in recent decades. Up to 2016 it has selected the Democratic candidate in 56% of presidential elections since 1980. Like most white, rural counties in America, however, the GOP has made significant advances in the county recently.

United States presidential election results for Lincoln County, Minnesota
Year	Republican		Democratic		Third party(ies)	
Year	No.	%	No.	%	No.	%
1876	88	83.02%	18	16.98%	0	0.00%
1880	468	80.69%	112	19.31%	0	0.00%
1884	599	73.32%	154	18.85%	64	7.83%
1888	594	56.25%	399	37.78%	63	5.97%
1892	318	28.65%	396	35.68%	396	35.68%
1896	674	46.90%	703	48.92%	60	4.18%
1900	866	59.64%	528	36.36%	58	3.99%
1904	1,323	79.70%	258	15.54%	79	4.76%
1908	891	53.51%	683	41.02%	91	5.47%
1912	264	16.40%	548	34.04%	798	49.57%
1916	777	38.18%	1,174	57.69%	84	4.13%
1920	2,548	75.30%	673	19.89%	163	4.82%
1924	1,657	48.03%	252	7.30%	1,541	44.67%
1928	1,952	48.20%	2,064	50.96%	34	0.84%
1932	974	23.97%	2,963	72.91%	127	3.13%
1936	1,199	27.66%	2,662	61.42%	473	10.91%
1940	2,220	46.36%	2,536	52.95%	33	0.69%
1944	1,600	40.85%	2,302	58.77%	15	0.38%
1948	1,312	32.08%	2,694	65.87%	84	2.05%
1952	2,746	58.96%	1,892	40.63%	19	0.41%
1956	2,060	46.92%	2,316	52.76%	14	0.32%
1960	2,147	46.10%	2,500	53.68%	10	0.21%
1964	1,393	31.46%	3,024	68.29%	11	0.25%
1968	1,732	42.98%	2,109	52.33%	189	4.69%
1972	1,881	45.93%	2,148	52.45%	66	1.61%
1976	1,599	37.47%	2,594	60.79%	74	1.73%
1980	2,122	51.49%	1,640	39.80%	359	8.71%
1984	1,905	50.09%	1,827	48.04%	71	1.87%
1988	1,479	43.18%	1,891	55.21%	55	1.61%
1992	1,084	29.81%	1,555	42.77%	997	27.42%
1996	1,199	35.49%	1,641	48.58%	538	15.93%
2000	1,513	46.07%	1,590	48.42%	181	5.51%
2004	1,736	51.94%	1,558	46.62%	48	1.44%
2008	1,491	47.70%	1,517	48.53%	118	3.77%
2012	1,595	51.12%	1,429	45.80%	96	3.08%
2016	1,931	63.96%	860	28.49%	228	7.55%
2020	2,121	68.09%	937	30.08%	57	1.83%
2024	2,190	67.70%	972	30.05%	73	2.26%

County Board of Commissioners
Position	Name	District
Commissioner	Corey Sik	District 1
Commissioner	Mic VanDeVere	District 2
Commissioner	Dean Nielsen	District 3
Commissioner	Joe Drietz	District 4
Commissioner	Steve Hauswedell	District 5

State Legislature (2024-2026)
Position	Name	Affiliation	District
Senate	Bill Weber	Republican	District 21
House of Representatives	Joe Schomacker	Republican	District 21A

U.S Congress (2018-2020)
Position	Name	Affiliation	District
House of Representatives	Michelle Fischbach	Republican	7th
Senate	Amy Klobuchar	Democrat	N/A
Senate	Tina Smith	Democrat	N/A

== See also ==
- National Register of Historic Places listings in Lincoln County, Minnesota
