= List of bridges documented by the Historic American Engineering Record in Wisconsin =

This is a list of bridges documented by the Historic American Engineering Record in the U.S. state of Wisconsin.

== Bridges ==
Survey No.	Name (as assigned by HAER)	Status	Type	Built	Documented	Carries	Crosses	Location	County	Coordinates
IA-2	Eagle Point Bridge	Replaced	Pennsylvania truss	1902	1982	US 61 / US 151	Mississippi River	Hazel Green, Wisconsin, and Dubuque, Iowa	Grant County, Wisconsin, and Dubuque County, Iowa	42°32′13″N 90°38′38″W
IA-43	Black Hawk Bridge	Extant	Cantilever	1931	1995	WIS 82/ Iowa 9	Mississippi River	De Soto, Wisconsin, and Lansing, Iowa	Crawford County, Wisconsin, and Allamakee County, Iowa	43°21′55″N 91°12′52″W
MN-8	Winona Bridge (Note: See also HAER No. NE-2, "Nebraska City Bridge" for additional documentation)	Abandoned	Swing span	1871	1985	Winona and St. Peter Railroad	Mississippi River	Buffalo, Wisconsin, and Winona, Minnesota	Buffalo County, Wisconsin, and Winona County, Minnesota	44°03′24″N 91°38′20″W
MN-91	Bridge No. 5930	Rehabilitated	Cantilever	1942	1997	WIS 54/ MN 43	Mississippi River main and north channels	Buffalo, Wisconsin, and Winona, Minnesota	Buffalo County, Wisconsin, and Winona County, Minnesota	44°03′27″N 91°38′23″W
WI-2	Sock Road Bridge	Replaced	Pratt truss	1893	1980	Sock Road	Beaver Dam River	Lowell	Dodge	43°21′07″N 88°50′00″W
WI-4	Turtleville Iron Bridge	Extant	Pratt truss	1887	1981	Lathers Road	Turtle Creek	Beloit	Rock	42°33′56″N 88°57′53″W
WI-5	Hemlock Bridge	Replaced	Pennsylvania truss	1914	1982	Warner Drive	Black River	Greenwood	Clark	44°49′15″N 90°36′45″W
WI-6	Longwood Bridge	Replaced	Parker truss	1900	1983	Church Road	Black River	Longwood	Clark	44°53′09″N 90°38′32″W
WI-12	Lake Wissota Bridge	Replaced	Parker truss	1908	1983	CTH-S	Lake Wissota	Chippewa Falls	Chippewa	44°58′40″N 91°20′32″W
WI-13	Seventh Street Bridge	Replaced	Howe truss	1910	1987	Seventh Street	Chicago, St. Paul, Minneapolis and Omaha Railway	Hudson	St. Croix	44°59′5″N 92°44′58″W
WI-14	Manchester Street Bridge	Extant	Parker truss	1884	1987	Manchester Street	Baraboo River	Baraboo	Sauk	43°28′16″N 89°45′23″W
WI-15	Polley Lane Bridge	Replaced	Pratt truss	1908	1986	Polley Lane	Yellow River	Gilman	Taylor	42°41′13″N 88°17′28″W
WI-16	White River Bridge	Extant	Pratt truss	1877	1987	Bieneman Road	Honey Creek	Burlington	Racine	42°41′13″N 88°17′28″W
WI-17	Range Line Road Bridge	Replaced	Warren truss	1908	1987	Range Line Road	Eau Claire River	Antigo	Langlade	45°10′56″N 89°14′53″W
WI-18	West Sixth Street Bridge	Replaced	Reinforced concrete open-spandrel arch	1928	1987	West Sixth Street	Root River	Racine	Racine	42°43′33″N 87°47′45″W
WI-19	Lake Park Lions Bridge	Extant	Steel arch	1897	1987	Oak Leaf Trail	Unnamed stream	Milwaukee	Milwaukee	43°03′55″N 87°52′15″W
WI-20	Lake Park Brick Arch Bridge	Extant	Brick arch	1893	1987	Lagoon Drive	Unnamed stream	Milwaukee	Milwaukee	43°04′26″N 87°52′11″W
WI-21	Tivoli Island Bridge	Extant	Bowstring arch truss	1877	1987	Tivoli Island Natural Park trail	Rock River west channel	Watertown	Jefferson	43°11′21″N 88°42′23″W
WI-22	McGilvray Road Bridge No. 1	Extant	Bowstring arch truss	1906	1987	McGilvray Road	Black River tributary	La Crosse	La Crosse	44°01′15″N 91°18′28″W
WI-22-A	McGilvray Road Bridge No. 2	Extant	Bowstring arch truss	1906	1987	McGilvray Road	Black River tributary	La Crosse	La Crosse	44°01′16″N 91°18′39″W
WI-22-B	McGilvray Road Bridge No. 3	Extant	Bowstring arch truss	1906	1987	McGilvray Road	Black River tributary	La Crosse	La Crosse	44°01′17″N 91°18′52″W
WI-22-C	McGilvray Road Bridge No. 4	Extant	Bowstring arch truss	1906	1987	McGilvray Road	Black River tributary	La Crosse	La Crosse	44°01′23″N 91°19′14″W
WI-22-D	McGilvray Road Bridge No. 6	Extant	Bowstring arch truss	1906	1987	McGilvray Road	Black River tributary	La Crosse	La Crosse	44°01′26″N 91°20′09″W
WI-23	Fountain Island Bridge	Replaced	Bowstring arch truss	1870	1987	Fountain Island path	Lakeside Park channel	Fond du Lac	Fond du Lac	43°47′51″N 88°26′41″W
WI-24	Chicago & North Western Railway Bridge No. 128	Extant	Stone arch	1869	1987	Chicago & North Western Railway	Turtle Creek	Tiffany	Rock	42°34′51″N 88°55′24″W
WI-25	North Avenue Viaduct	Replaced	Reinforced concrete open-spandrel arch	1921	1987	East North Avenue	Milwaukee River	Milwaukee	Milwaukee	43°03′37″N 87°53′38″W
WI-26	Highland Boulevard Viaduct	Replaced	Reinforced concrete closed-spandrel arch	1909	1987	West Highland Boulevard	Chicago, Milwaukee & St. Paul Railroad	Milwaukee	Milwaukee	43°02′43″N 87°57′54″W
WI-27	Grand Avenue Viaduct	Replaced	Reinforced concrete open-spandrel arch	1911	1987	West Wisconsin Avenue	Menomonee River	Milwaukee	Milwaukee	43°02′20″N 87°57′55″W
WI-28	Yellow River Bridge	Extant	Pennsylvania truss	1908	1987	CTH-T	Chippewa River	Arthur	Chippewa	45°06′25″N 91°12′30″W
WI-29	New London Bridge	Replaced	Cantilever	1934	1987	WIS 54	Embarrass River	New London	Waupaca	44°24′11″N 88°44′08″W
WI-30	Eau Claire Dells Bridge	Extant	Reinforced concrete closed-spandrel arch	1927	1987	CTH-Y	Eau Claire River	Plover	Marathon	45°00′16″N 89°20′16″W
WI-31	Wagon Trail Road Bridge	Replaced	Pratt truss	1909	1987	Wagon Trail Road	Eau Galle River	Spring Valley	Pierce	44°50′31″N 92°13′42″W
WI-32	Horlick Drive Bridge	Replaced	Reinforced concrete closed-spandrel arch	1908	1987	Horlick Drive	Root River	Racine	Racine	42°43′37″N 87°48′20″W
WI-33	Milwaukee Street Bridge	Replaced	Reinforced concrete open-spandrel arch	1930	1987	Milwaukee Street	Rock River	Watertown	Jefferson	43°11′24″N 88°43′35″W
WI-34	Palm Tree Road Bridge	Extant	Stone arch	1903	1987	Palm Tree Road	Sheboygan River	St. Cloud	Fond du Lac	43°48′52″N 88°09′53″W
WI-35	Mill Bridge	Extant	Stone arch	1907	1987	Mill Street	Little Wolf River	Scandinavia	Waupaca	44°27′27″N 89°08′51″W
WI-36	Bridge of Pines	Bypassed	Warren truss	1907	1987	Ermatinger Drive	Irvine Park ravine	Chippewa Falls	Chippewa	44°57′40″N 91°24′10″W
WI-37	Spring Street Bridge	Extant	Reinforced concrete through arch	1916	1987	East Spring Street	Duncan Creek	Chippewa Falls	Chippewa	44°56′11″N 91°23′26″W
WI-38	Marathon City Bridge	Replaced	Parker truss	1930	1987	WIS 107	Big Rib River	Marathon	Marathon	44°56′07″N 89°50′25″W
WI-39	Chicago & North Western Railway Bridge No. 344	Extant	Stone arch	1878	1987	Chicago & North Western Railway	Goette Road	Merrimac	Sauk	43°23′35″N 89°40′56″W
WI-40	Sauk Creek Bridge	Extant	King post truss	1925	1987	Meyer Lane	Sauk Creek	Port Washington	Ozaukee	43°23′11″N 87°52′09″W
WI-41	Beaver Dam Road Bridge	Demolished	Pratt truss	1896	1987	Beaver Dam Road	Rock River	Addison	Washington	43°27′15″N 88°22′02″W
WI-42	Bear Creek Bridge	Replaced	Pratt truss	1886	1987	St. Killian Road	Bear Creek	Sextonville	Richland	43°17′09″N 90°12′29″W
WI-43	Wrightstown Bridge	Extant	Stone arch	1909	1987	Mallard Road	East River	Wrightstown	Brown	44°20′08″N 88°06′43″W
WI-44	Branch River Bridge	Replaced	Pratt truss	1912	1987	Hillcrest Road	Branch River	Kellnersville	Manitowoc	44°11′47″N 87°49′43″W
WI-45	Coltman Bridge	Replaced	Warren truss	1917	1987	Horseshoe Bend Road	Fever River	Benton	Lafayette	42°34′18″N 90°21′17″W
WI-46	Eau Claire River Bridge	Replaced	Parker truss	1931	1987	Bus. US 51 (Grand Avenue)	Eau Claire River	Schofield	Marathon	44°54′59″N 89°36′42″W
WI-51	Cunningham Lane Bridge	Replaced	Pratt truss	1895	1987	Cunningham Lane	Pine River	Rockbridge	Richland	43°26′28″N 90°21′32″W
WI-52	Cedar Street Bridge	Demolished	Steel arch	1908	1987	Cedar Street	Kinnickinnic River	River Falls	Pierce	44°51′42″N 92°37′28″W
WI-53	Green Bay Road Bridge	Replaced	Reinforced concrete girder	1922	1987	Green Bay Road	Pigeon Creek	Thiensville	Ozaukee	43°13′50″N 87°59′0″W
WI-54	Bridgeport Bridge	Replaced	Pennsylvania truss	1857	1987	US 18	Wisconsin River	Bridgeport	Crawford	43°00′06″N 91°03′09″W
WI-55	Kennan-Jump River Bridge	Replaced	Parker truss	1927	1987	CTH-N	Jump River south fork	Kennan	Price	45°24′14″N 90°37′02″W
WI-57	Sprague Bridge	Replaced	Pratt truss	1913	1988	9th Street East	Yellow River	Armenia and Necedah	Juneau	44°08′32″N 90°06′36″W
WI-58	Ferndale Road Bridge	Replaced	Pratt truss	1910	1988	North Ferndale Road	Peshtigo River	Wausaukee	Marinette	45°08′06″N 87°50′35″W
WI-59	Chester Bridge	Demolished	Pratt truss	1893	1988	Old Marsh Road	Rock River	East Waupun	Dodge	43°37′26″N 88°41′00″W
WI-60	Wisconsin-Michigan Railroad Bridge	Replaced	Pratt truss	1894	1989	CTH-JJ	Menominee River	Wagner, Wisconsin, and Koss, Michigan	Marinette County, Wisconsin, and Menominee County, Michigan	45°23′13″N 87°42′06″W
WI-61	Prescott Bridge	Replaced	Vertical-lift bridge	1922	1989	US 10	St. Croix River	Prescott, Wisconsin, and Point Douglas, Minnesota	Pierce County, Wisconsin, and Washington County, Minnesota	44°44′56″N 92°48′17″W
WI-63	Lynch Bridge	Replaced	Pennsylvania truss	1940	1989	River Road	Black River	Levis	Clark	44°30′07″N 90°38′10″W
WI-64	State Highway Bridge No. 16	Replaced	Warren truss	1905	1984	WIS 131 (former)	Kickapoo River	La Farge	Vernon	43°36′47″N 90°37′34″W
WI-65	Bridge No. 18	Replaced	Warren truss	1912	1984	WIS 131 (former)	Kickapoo River	La Farge	Vernon	43°35′41″N 90°37′59″W
WI-66	Heath Bridge	Replaced	Pratt truss	1914	1991	Blomberg Road	Chippewa River	Exeland	Sawyer	45°41′19″N 91°11′56″W
WI-67	Bowen Mill Bridge	Replaced	Pratt truss	1907	1992	CTH-AA	Pine River	Richland Center	Richland	43°22′23″N 90°23′02″W
WI-68	Tayco Street Bridge	Extant	Strauss bascule	1929	1992	Tayco Street	Government Canal	Menasha	Winnebago	44°11′54″N 88°27′09″W
WI-69	Chippewa River Bridge	Replaced	Parker truss	1933	1993	WIS 35	Chippewa River	Nelson	Buffalo	44°26′13″N 92°04′29″W
WI-70	Waupaca River Bridge	Replaced	Stone arch	1891	1993	Mill Street	Waupaca River	Waupaca	Waupaca	44°21′38″N 89°05′00″W
WI-71	Melrose Bridge	Replaced	Pennsylvania truss	1922	1994	WIS 108	Black River	Melrose	Jackson	44°06′31″N 90°59′46″W
WI-72	Grand Avenue Bridge	Replaced	Pratt truss	1894	1994	Grand Avenue	O'Neil Creek	Neillsville	Clark	44°33′47″N 90°35′54″W
WI-73	Shaw Farm Bridge	Replaced	Pratt truss	1923	1994	CTH-E	Chippewa River	Island Lake	Rusk	45°17′51″N 91°14′14″W
WI-74	Bert Parsons Bridge	Replaced	Pratt truss	1914	1994	West Fisher Drive	Fisher River	Cornell	Chippewa	45°11′32″N 91°07′37″W
WI-75	Earl Iron Bridge	Replaced	Pratt truss	1914	1995	North Road	Namekagon River	Earl	Washburn	45°54′57″N 91°45′51″W
WI-76	Black River Bridge	Replaced	Reinforced concrete truss	1921	1994	Grand Avenue	Black River	Neillsville	Clark	44°34′12″N 90°35′53″W
WI-78	Eighth Street Bascule Bridge	Replaced	Simple trunnion bascule	1926	1994	US 10 (Eighth Street)	Manitowoc River	Manitowoc	Manitowoc	44°05′32″N 87°39′28″W
WI-79	Roosevelt Drive Bridge	Replaced	Reinforced concrete girder	1927	1994	Roosevelt Drive	Menomonee River	Menomonee Falls	Waukesha	43°10′56″N 88°06′52″W
WI-80	Menominee River Bridge	Replaced	Reinforced concrete girder	1927	1994	CTH-K (Chalk Hill Road)	Menominee River	Amberg, Wisconsin, and Holmes Township, Michigan	Marinette County, Wisconsin, and Menominee County, Michigan	45°30′44″N 87°48′06″W
WI-81	Meadow Road Bridge	Replaced	Pratt truss	1890	1995	Meadow Road	Beaver Dam River	Lowell	Dodge	43°22′20″N 88°51′27″W
WI-82	Main Street Bridge	Replaced	Strauss bascule	1923	1995	US 141 (Main Street)	Fox River	Green Bay	Brown	44°31′06″N 88°00′54″W
WI-92	Bridge Street Bridge	Replaced	Pratt truss	1888	1996	Bridge Street	Milwaukee River	Grafton	Ozaukee	43°19′07″N 87°56′57″W
WI-93	Ninabuck Road Bridge	Replaced	Pratt truss	1907	1996	Ninabuck Road	Crawfish River	Danville	Dodge	43°19′17″N 88°58′05″W
WI-94	Ten Eyck Road Bridge	Replaced	Pratt truss	1907	1996	Ten Eyck Road	Sugar River	Brodhead	Green	42°36′44″N 89°23′54″W
WI-95	Dunnville Bridge	Replaced	Warren truss	1934	1996	CTH-Y	Red Cedar River	Downsville	Dunn	44°43′01″N 91°53′50″W
WI-96	Meadow Hill Drive Bridge	Replaced	Parker truss	1926	1996	Meadow Hill Drive	Wilson Creek	Menomonie	Dunn	44°53′08″N 91°55′46″W
WI-97	Scofield Road Bridge	Demolished	Warren truss	1891	1996	Scofield Road	Chicago & Northwestern Railroad	Lebanon	Dodge	43°15′42″N 88°38′28″W
WI-98	Poplar Grove Road Bridge	Replaced	Warren truss	1883	1996	Poplar Grove Road	Chicago & Northwestern Railroad	Lebanon	Dodge	43°14′56″N 88°35′45″W
WI-99	Sawyer Avenue Bridge	Replaced	Pratt truss	1906	1996	Sawyer Avenue	Black River	Medford	Taylor	45°08′47″N 90°33′08″W
WI-100	CTH D Bridge	Replaced	Parker truss	1935	1996	CTH-D	Eau Galle River	Eau Galle	Dunn	44°41′31″N 92°00′40″W
WI-101	Racine Street Bridge	Replaced	Warren truss	1936	1996	US 18 (Racine Street)	Rock River	Jefferson	Jefferson	43°00′19″N 88°48′33″W
WI-103	Taylor Bridge	Replaced	Queen post truss	1930	1997	Bayfield Road	Middle River	Amnicon Falls	Douglas	46°35′24″N 91°49′59″W
WI-105	Muskego Avenue Bridge	Replaced	Simple trunnion bascule	1904	2016	North Emmber Lane	Menomonee River	Milwaukee	Milwaukee	43°01′57″N 87°55′45″W
WI-106	Chicago & Northwestern Railroad Bridge	Demolished	Steel built-up girder	1902	1999	Chicago & Northwestern Railroad	Eagle River	Eagle River	Vilas	45°55′07″N 89°15′14″W
WI-116	National Home for Disabled Volunteer Soldiers, Northwestern Branch, Metal Steam-Pipe Trestle	Demolished	Trestle	1922	2012	Steam pipes		Milwaukee	Milwaukee	43°01′30″N 87°58′40″W
WI-117	Cedarburg Covered Bridge	Extant	Town lattice truss	1876	2015	Covered Bridge Road	Cedar Creek	Cedarburg	Ozaukee	43°20′15″N 88°00′18″W
WI-118	Dale Creek Culvert	Replaced	Culvert	1960	2014	Southway	Dale Creek	Greendale	Milwaukee	42°56′08″N 87°59′35″W
