= Winona station =

Historic train station in Winona, Minnesota

Winona, MN
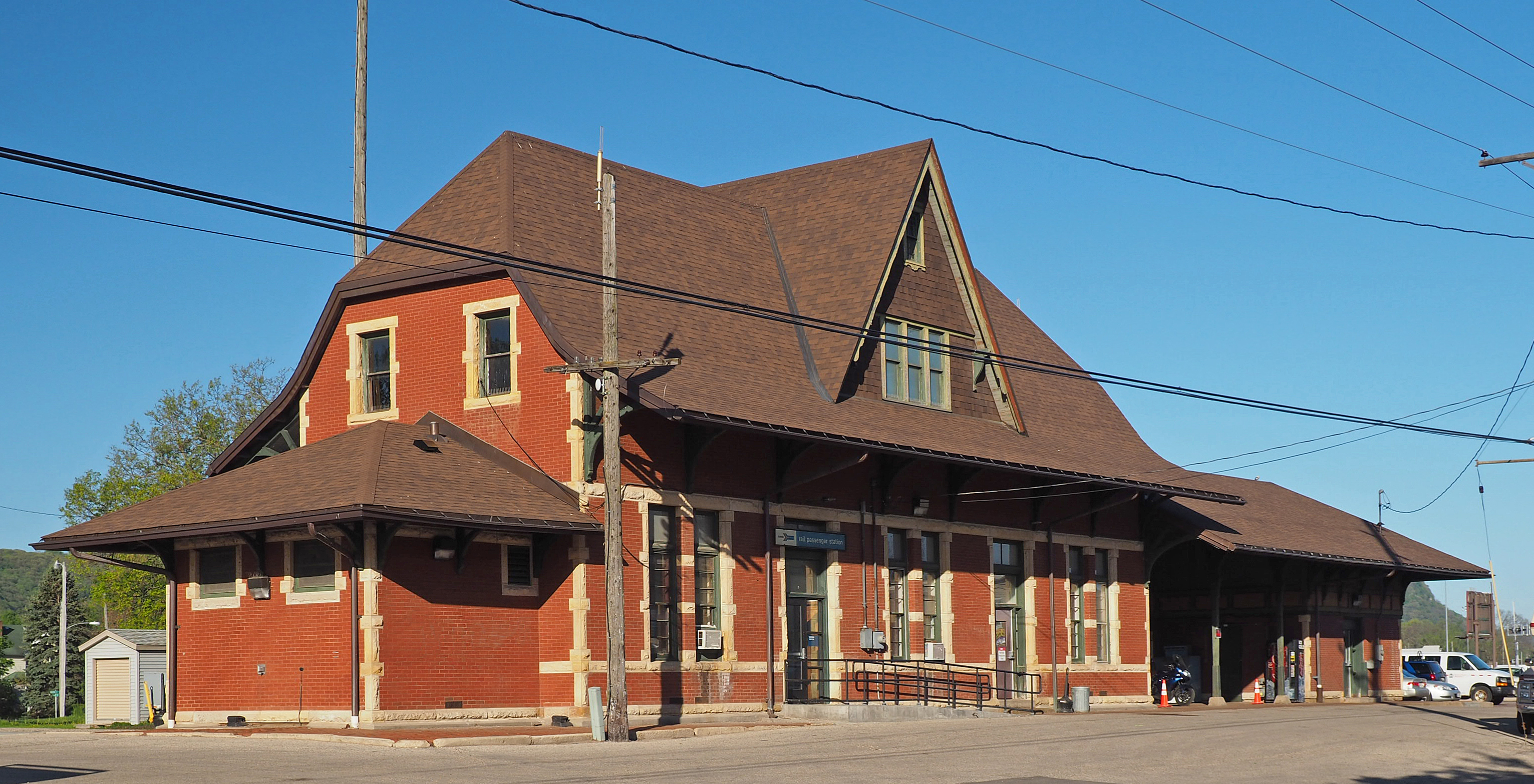
- Winona station from the northeast

General information
- Location: 65 East Mark Street; Winona, Minnesota; United States
- Coordinates: 44°2′39.5″N 91°38′24.5″W
- Line: CPKC River Subdivision
- Platforms: 1 side platform
- Tracks: 2
- Connections: Winona Transit Service

Construction
- Parking: Yes
- Accessible: Yes

Other information
- Station code: Amtrak: WIN

History
- Opened: 1888

Passengers
- FY 2025: 23,673 (Amtrak)

Services
Preceding station	Amtrak	Following station
Red Wing toward St. Paul	Borealis	La Crosse toward Chicago
Red Wing toward Seattle or Portland	Empire Builder	La Crosse toward Chicago
Former services
Preceding station	Milwaukee Road	Following station
Minnesota City toward Seattle or Tacoma	Main Line	Homer toward Chicago
Preceding station	Chicago Great Western Railway	Following station
Minnesota City toward Osage	Osage - Winona	Terminus
- Chicago, Milwaukee & St. Paul Railway Station
- U.S. National Register of Historic Places
- Interactive map of Chicago, Milwaukee & St. Paul Railway Station
- Architectural style: Late Victorian
- NRHP reference No.: 13000327
- Added to NRHP: May 28, 2013
Location

Winona station is an Amtrak train station in Winona, Minnesota, United States. It is served by the daily round trips of the Borealis and Empire Builder. The station building was listed on the National Register of Historic Places in 2013 as the Chicago, Milwaukee & St. Paul Railway Station. The station is typically the second-busiest Amtrak station in Minnesota (after Saint Paul).

== History ==
The station built in 1888 by the Chicago, Milwaukee, St. Paul and Pacific Railroad (Milwaukee Road). A former Milwaukee Road freight house is also extant. The station was designed by architect John T. W. Jennings. It was listed on the National Register of Historic Places in 2013 for having local significance in the theme of transportation. It was nominated for representing the development of train transportation in Minnesota with Winona as a major rail hub.

=== Other stations in Winona ===
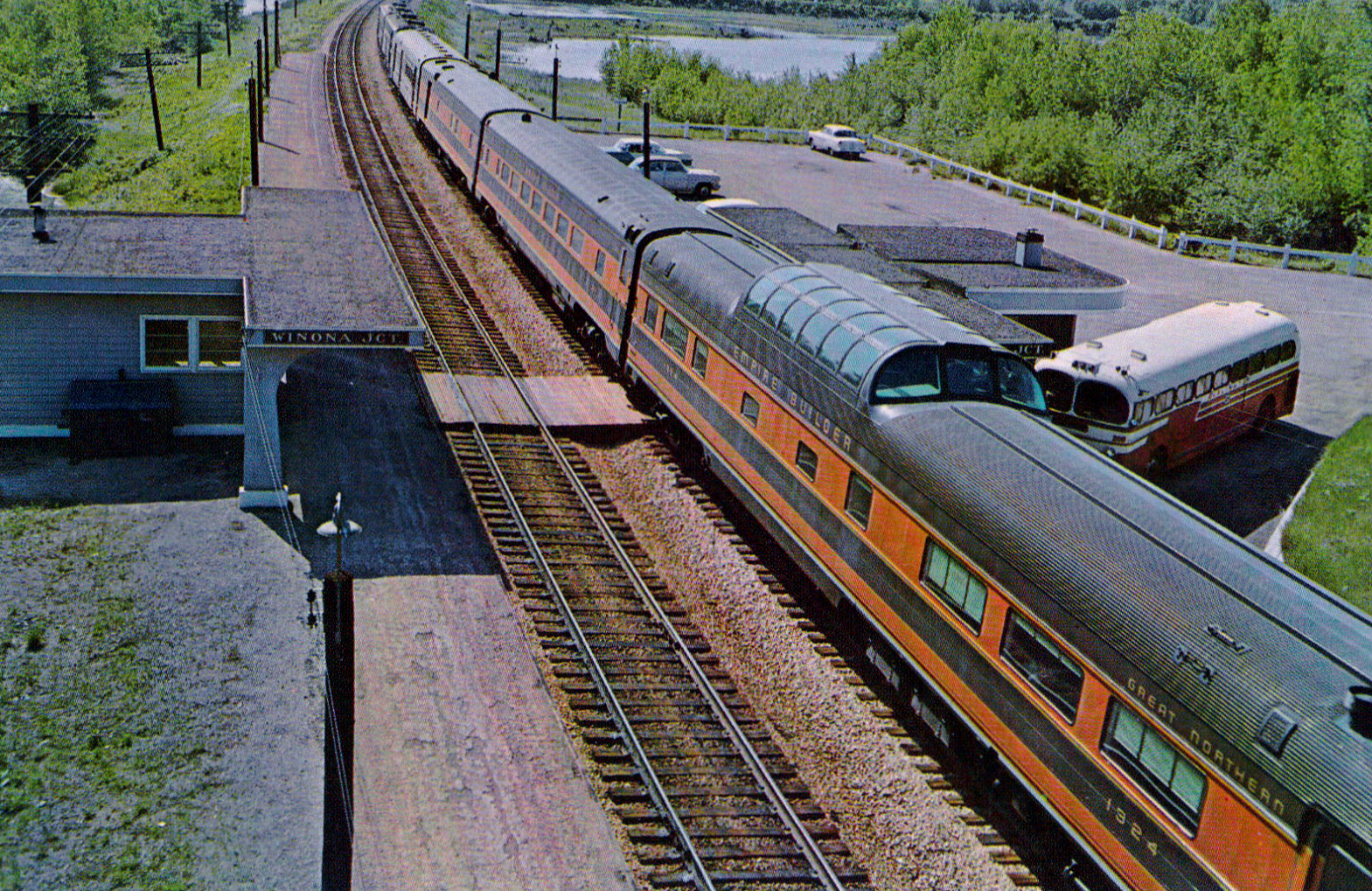
The Empire Builder at Winona Junction station in 1958

Winona also had a Chicago and North Western Railroad depot that was located at 2nd and Huff. It was a two-story brick station, "mildly Queen Anne in style" Originally built in the late 1880s for the Winona and St. Peter Railroad at the loop where the Winona Rail Bridge crossed the Mississippi river, it was torn down in 1980. The demolition of this depot building was a motivation for the Winona Heritage Association to partner with the Milwaukee Road to restore the remaining station.

After the Milwaukee Road went into its final bankruptcy, it had deferred maintenance on the Winona station, which made it likely that building also would be demolished.

The original Chicago, Burlington and Quincy Empire Builder stopped at the Winona Junction station. It was on the east side of the Mississippi river in Buffalo, Buffalo County, Wisconsin on what is now the BNSF Northern Transcon line. Because this station was located across the Main Channel Bridge from downtown Winona, connecting "Burlington Bus" service was provided. East Winona was another station location on the same track further southeast.

== See also ==
- National Register of Historic Places listings in Winona County, Minnesota
