= Plover (town), Wisconsin =

There are two towns in Wisconsin named Plover:

- Plover, Portage County, Wisconsin
- Plover, Marathon County, Wisconsin
