= Big Bend, Wisconsin =

Big Bend is the name of some places in the U.S. state of Wisconsin:

- Big Bend, Rusk County, Wisconsin, a town
- Big Bend, Waukesha County, Wisconsin, a village
