= Plover, Wisconsin (disambiguation) =

Plover may refer to:

- Plover, Wisconsin, a village in Portage County
- Plover, Portage County, Wisconsin, a town
- Plover, Marathon County, Wisconsin, a town
