= Winona Junction, Wisconsin =

Winona Junction, Wisconsin may refer to:

- Medary (community), Wisconsin, also known as Winona Junction, in La Crosse County
- Winona Junction rail station, a passenger station for the Chicago, Burlington and Quincy Railroad in Buffalo, Buffalo County, Wisconsin
