= Grand Avenue Bridge =

Grand Avenue Bridge may refer to:

- Grand Avenue Bridge (Chicago), a movable bridge over the North Branch of the Chicago River
- Grand Avenue Bridge (Des Moines, Iowa), a non-contributing structure in the Civic Center Historic District
- Grand Avenue Bridge (Glenwood Springs, Colorado) which carries Colorado State Highway 82 over the Colorado River
- Grand Avenue Bridge (Neillsville, Wisconsin) which was on the list of bridges on the National Register of Historic Places in Wisconsin until demolished in 1985
- Grand Avenue Bridge (Spencer, Iowa), a renovated bridge that is part of the city's cultural district
- Grand Avenue Swing Bridge (New Haven, Connecticut), a contributing structure to the Quinnipiac River Historic District

== See also ==
- Grand Street Bridge, a movable bridge over Newtown Creek in Brooklyn and Queens, New York
- Grand Street Bridge, a former bridge over the Pequonnock River in Bridgeport, Connecticut
