= Steve Drazkowski =

American politician

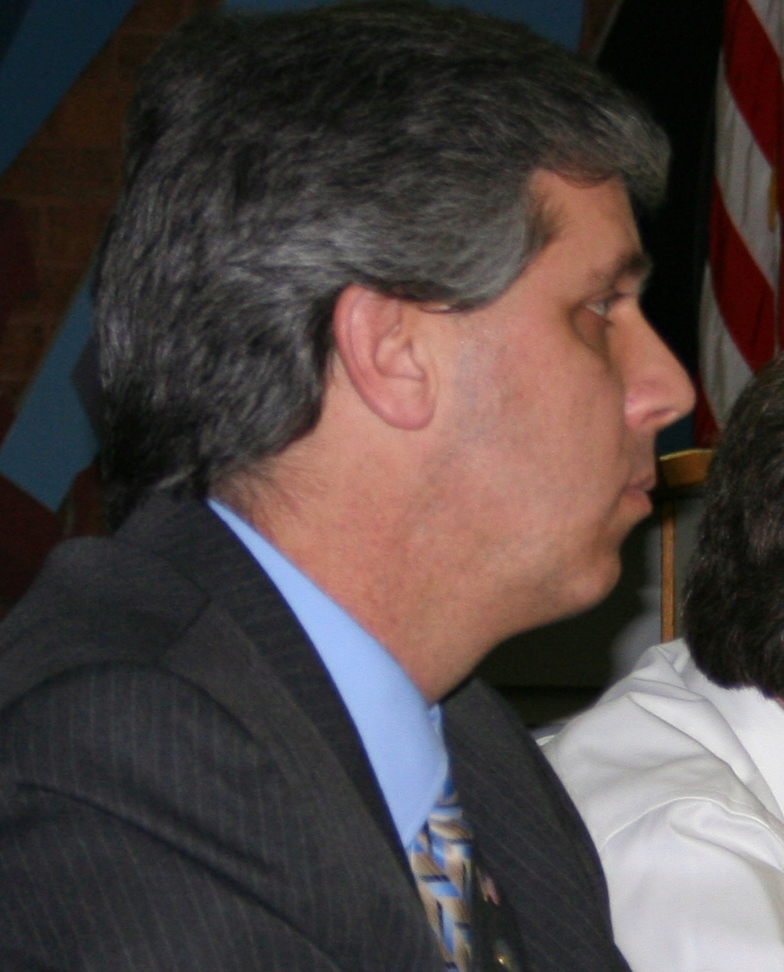

Member of the Minnesota Senate from the 20th District
- Incumbent
- Assumed office January 3, 2023
- Preceded by: redrawn district

Member of the Minnesota House of Representatives
- In office August 16, 2007 – January 3, 2023
- Preceded by: Steve Sviggum
- Succeeded by: Steve Jacob
- Constituency: 28B (2007–2013); 21B (2013–present)

Personal details
- Born: November 27, 1964 (age 61) Winona, Minnesota, U.S.
- Party: Republican
- Education: University of Wisconsin, River Falls (BS); University of Minnesota (MEd)

Steve Drazkowski (born November 27, 1964) is an American politician serving as a member of the Minnesota Senate from District 20, representing all of Wabasha County, large parts of Olmsted County, Goodhue County, and Winona County, and a smaller part of Dakota County. He previously served in the Minnesota House of Representatives.

== Early life and education ==
Drazkowski was born in Winona, Minnesota, and grew up on a farm in Bluff Siding, Wisconsin. He graduated from Cochrane-Fountain City High School and earned a Bachelor of Science in agriculture in 1989 from the University of Wisconsin-River Falls. In 1994, he earned a Master of Education degree from the University of Minnesota.

== Career ==
Drazkowski is a Minnesota Department of Natural Resources firearms safety instructor, Wabasha County 4-H volunteer, and past president of the Minnesota Forage and Grassland Council.

In 2006, Drazkowski ran unsuccessfully for the District 28 seat in the Minnesota Senate. He subsequently ran for and was elected to the Minnesota House of Representatives in the August 7, 2007 special election held after Representative Steve Sviggum resigned to become Minnesota's Commissioner of Labor and Industry. He was reelected in 2008, 2010, 2012, 2014, 2016, 2018, and 2020.

In 2010, Drazkowski introduced legislation in the Minnesota House modeled after Arizona's controversial immigration law.

In 2012, Drazkowski and radio host Dave Thompson proposed an Employee Freedom Constitutional Amendment, which would require a statewide referendum on amending the Minnesota Constitution to include a right-to-work clause weakening unions.

In early 2019, Drazkowski referred U.S. Representative Ilhan Omar to the Minnesota Campaign Finance and Public Disclosure Board, which enforces Minnesota election ethics rules.

On December 7, 2018, Drazkowski and three other Republican state representatives left the GOP House Caucus to form the New Republican House Caucus. Drazkowski said, "It doesn’t change the fact we’re still Republican. As a matter of fact, our caucus of four is very committed to Republican ideals and values ... We’ll be working very hard to strengthen our party throughout Minnesota, strengthen party units and conservative organizations throughout the state so that we can win the election in two years instead of continuing on a course that could be very similar to the one [November 2018] that really just took 25 percent of our Republican membership in the House." The four members were assigned seats together on the House floor and hired three staff members shortly before the 2019 session began. During the session, they announced several bills that featured their strong interest in constitutional issues and also presented their own budget proposal.

While arguing against a 2023 bill providing Minnesota students with free breakfast and lunch, Drazkowski said he had "yet to meet a person in Minnesota that is hungry", had "yet to meet a person in Minnesota that says they don't have access to enough food to eat", and that "hunger is a relative term". A video of Drazkowski making the comments went viral on Twitter and led to national coverage. The bill's sponsor, State Senator Heather Gustafson, tweeted that "1 in 5 students in Sen. Drazkowski's district qualifies for free and reduced lunch".

On March 17, 2025, Drazkowski was one of the five Republican authors of a bill, SF2589, that would designate "Trump Derangement Syndrome" as an officially recognized mental illness in Minnesota.

== Electoral history ==
- 2020 Race for Minnesota House of Representatives — District 21B
  - Steve Drazkowski (R) 66.6% (15,647 votes)
  - Elise Diesslin (DFL), 33.3% (7,831 votes)
  - Write-in, 0.1% (24 votes)
- 2018 Race for Minnesota House of Representatives — District 21B
  - Steve Drazkowski (R) 63.4% (11,511 votes)
  - Jonathan Isenor (DFL), 36.5% (6,619 votes)
  - Write-in, 0.1% (17 votes)
- 2016 Race for Minnesota House of Representatives — District 21B
  - Steve Drazkowski (R) 65.31% (13,688 votes)
  - Elise Diesslin (DFL), 34.69% (7,270 votes)
- 2014 Race for Minnesota House of Representatives — District 21B
  - Steve Drazkowski (R) 63.3% (9,075 votes)
  - M.A. Schneider (DFL), 36.4% (5,213 votes)
  - Write-in, 0.3% (41 votes)
- 2012 Race for Minnesota House of Representatives — District 21B
  - Steve Drazkowski (R) 58% (11,759 votes)
  - Bruce Montplaisir (DFL), 42% (8,511 votes)
- 2010 Race for Minnesota House of Representatives — District 28B
  - Steve Drazkowski (R) 65.15% (9,669 votes)
  - Mark Schneider (DFL), 34.77% (5,160 votes)
  - Write-in, 0.08% (12 votes)
- 2008 Race for Minnesota House of Representatives — District 28B
  - Steve Drazkowski (R) 54.75% (10,980 votes)
  - Linda Pfeilsticker (DFL), 45.13% (9,050 votes)
  - Write-in, 0.12% (24 votes)
- 2007 Race for Minnesota House of Representatives — District 28B Special Election
  - Steve Drazkowski (R) 52.89% (3,762 votes)
  - Linda Pfeilsticker (DFL), 46.86% (3,333 votes)
  - Write-in, 0.25% (18 votes)
- 2006 Race for Minnesota Senate — District 28
  - Steve Murphy (DFL), 54.26% (17,511 votes)
  - Steve Drazkowski(R), 45.33% (14,627 votes)
  - Steve Wilson (Write-In), 0.20% (64 votes)
  - Write-In 0.21% (68 votes)

== Personal life ==
Drazkowski is a member of the National Rifle Association of America, Whitetails Unlimited, Ducks Unlimited, and both the Lake City and Frontenac Sportsmens Clubs. He is Catholic and attends St. Peter and Paul Church in Mazeppa. He is divorced; he and his ex-wife, Laura, have one child. In 2006, before he was elected to the legislature, Drazkowski was arrested and charged with assaulting his then 14-year-old daughter. He was acquitted, but at Laura's request, the judge issued a temporary restraining order against him. He co-owns an online retail business and a shoe store in Winona and resides in Mazeppa.

Minnesota House of Representatives
Preceded by Steve Sviggum; Kenyon	Member of the House of Representatives from the 21B district 28B (2007–2013); 2007–present	Incumbent
