= St. Croix Subdivision =

Railway line in Wisconsin and Minnesota

Coordinates: 44°25′41″N 92°4′3″W

The St. Croix Subdivision or St. Croix Sub is an American rail line operated by the BNSF Railway. It runs approximately 150 miles (240 km) from La Crosse, Wisconsin to Saint Paul, Minnesota, following the Mississippi River. It runs through the communities of La Crosse, Onalaska, Brice Prairie, Trempealeau, East Winona, Fountain City, Cochrane, Buffalo City, Alma, Nelson, Pepin, Stockholm, Maiden Rock, Bay City, Diamond Bluff, and Prescott, Wisconsin. This section of track sees 55-60 trains a day and is double tracked for most of the 150 miles with exceptions of Burns to Prescott, Mears to Trevino, and Winona Jct. to East Winona. The BNSF vertical lift bridge (adjacent to the Prescott Drawbridge) over the mouth of the St. Croix river is single-tracked.

This route was built by the Chicago, Burlington and Quincy Railroad. Up until 1885, CB&Q only ran from Chicago to Oregon, Illinois. Work began in 1885 to reach the Twin Cities. The line was completed in 1886. The CB&Q operated the line until CB&Q merged with others to become the Burlington Northern Railroad. Two of the Burlington Route's merger partners had used this stretch of track to run their passenger trains between Chicago, Illinois and Minneapolis–Saint Paul for many years beforehand: The Northern Pacific Railway's North Coast Limited went on the CB&Q, as did the Great Northern Railway's Empire Builder. The Burlington's own Morning and Afternoon Zephyrs also used the line. In the late 1970s, these trains were typically running combined between Chicago and the Twin Cities. However, these trains stopped running on the St. Croix Subdivision in 1971 when Amtrak took over most passenger train service in the United States. The Empire Builder was the only one of these trains to survive, and it was shifted to run on the former route of the Milwaukee Road Hiawatha.
