= Dells of the Eau Claire County Park =

County Park in Marathon County, Wisconsin

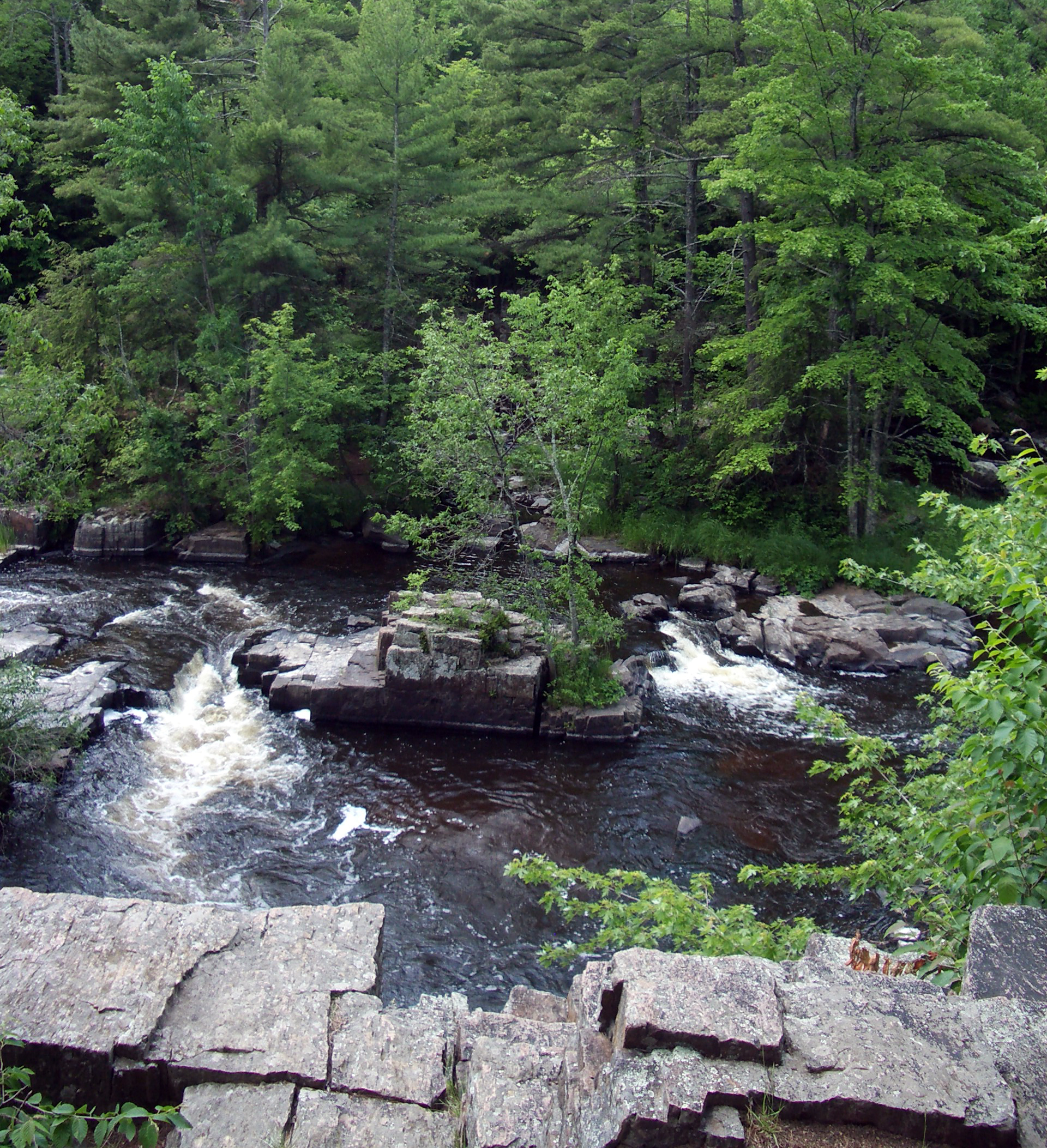
- Dells of the Eau Claire River

- Location within Wisconsin Location within the United States
- Location: Marathon County, Wisconsin, USA
- Nearest city: Town of Plover
- Coordinates: 45°00′20″N 89°20′16″W
- Area: 190 acres (0.77 km^{2})
- Governing body: Marathon County

Dells of the Eau Claire County Park is in the north-central Wisconsin Town of Plover, east of the city of Wausau. It is divided in two by the Eau Claire River. The river flows through a rocky gorge to form cascades and waterfalls as it passes over and around weathered boulders, outcrops, and other formations. The depth of the river can vary depending on the time of the year. The park also has areas designated for camping, swimming, hiking, and picnicking.

Although the park shares a name with the city of Eau Claire, Wisconsin, that city is over 100 miles (160 km) to the west. Also, this park should not be confused with the Wisconsin Dells, an area with its own formations over 100 miles (160 km) to the south.

The park was listed on the National Register of Historic Places on July 15, 2016 (ID number 16000429).

== History ==
In 1923 the Marathon County Park Commission bought 60 acres (24 ha) around the dells of the Eau Claire, establishing its fourth county park. Charles Ramsdell, a landscape architect from Minneapolis, planned the initial development of the park, which included trails, a picnic grove, and a concession stand, keeping in mind the County Park Commission's directive to not "replace the natural and picturesque with the artificial and commonplace park development." Through the 1920s and early 1930s the county cleared brush, built stone steps, and developed a baseball field.

The rustic stone highway bridge that carries County K across the river above the gorge was built in 1927. It was designed by G. H. Kirsch of the Wisconsin Highway Commission, a 116.5-foot-long (35.5 m) reinforced concrete, filled spandrel arch bridge. The concrete was faced with a rubble stone veneer to "accent its rustic surroundings." W. H. Fischer and Sons of Antigo was the general contractor.

In 1937 Ingwal S. Horgen, another landscape architect and by then Marathon County's park superintendent, created the Master Plan for the park, concentrating buildings in one area to preserve the natural features, and laying out trails and paths to highlight those features. He deliberately left large areas in permanent forest. The footbridge was part of his plan, and the Rustic-styled buildings, a style just then becoming common in American parks. Eighty years later, much of Horgen's design is still in place.

Civilian Conservation Corps Company 3649th Camp Rib Mountain carried out much of Horgen's design, working with him. That company also worked on Rib Mountain State Park and Eau Pleine County Park. From 1935 to 1942 the CCC built the foot-bridge, stone steps, the Combination Building, and other structures. They picked the stones for the foot-bridge from the gorge, to match the gorge.

The park received designation as a State Natural Area in 1973. It was listed on the National Register of Historic Places in 2016.

== Geography ==
The river in Dells of the Eau Claire County Park runs through a rock gorge with waterfalls and rapids. A portion of the Ice Age Trail passes through the park.

== Geology ==
Bedrock outcrops along the river have been dated around 1.8 billion years old. Precambrian-age rhyolite schist, formed through metamorphosis, is the type of rock that lies flat and also stands upright at places in the gorge. Geological processes have tilted this rock to near-vertical positions, creating formations of varying heights. The northern edge of the gorge has the highest vertical tilts. The swirling action of sand and gravel in the water current has also produced potholes.

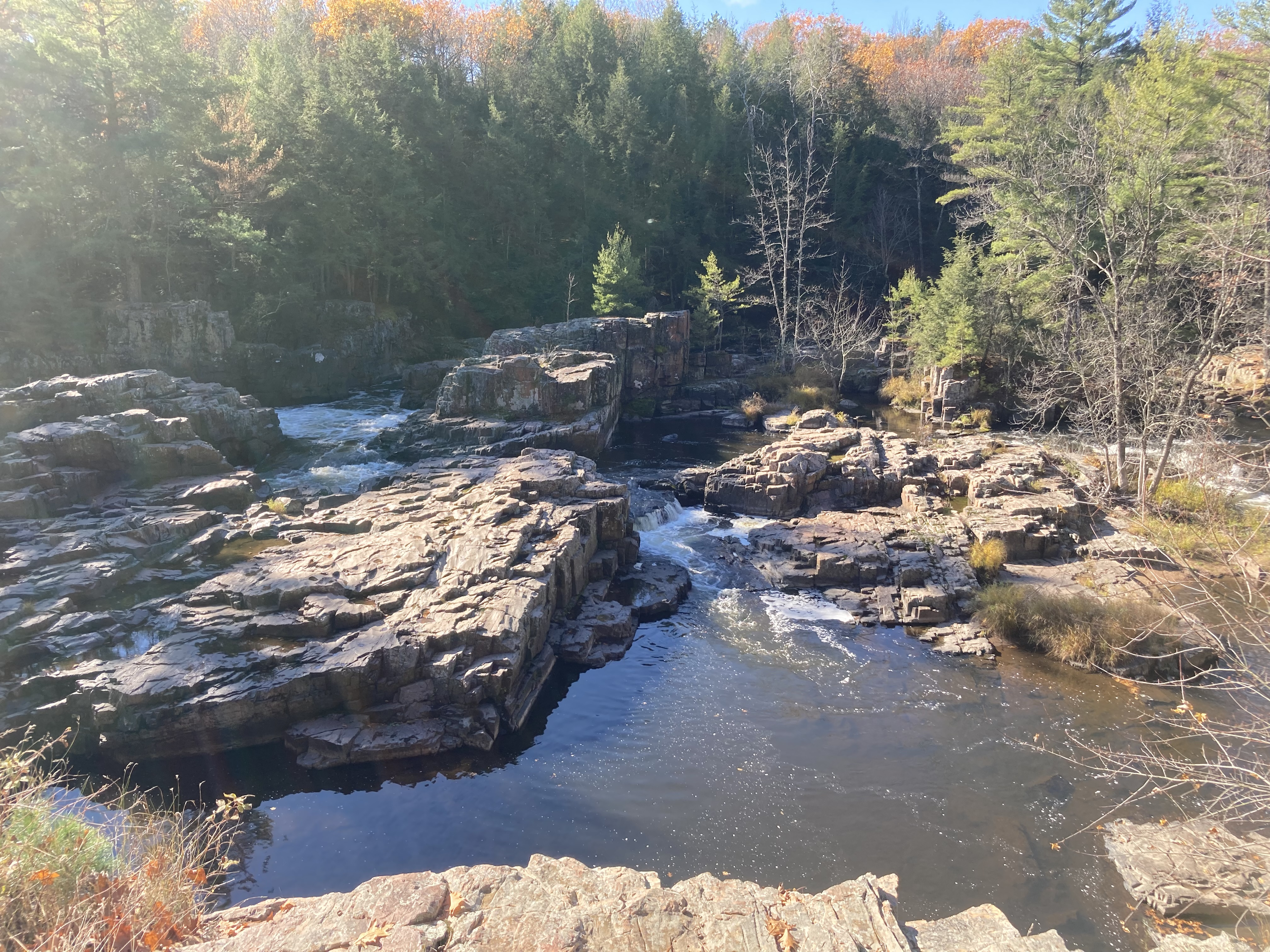
Dells of the Eau Claire on October 30, 2021

The forested areas as well as the river banks and gorge feature a northern mesic forest of hemlock, sugar maple, mountain maple, yellow birch, and Canada yew.

== Climate ==
With an average annual snowfall of 52 inches (132 cm) in Marathon County, run-off from snowmelt creates higher water levels in the Eau Claire River during the springtime. In summer and fall, water levels in the Eau Claire River tend to be lower, with average rainfall seldom exceeding 4 to 5 inches (10 to 13 cm) per month.

== Recreation ==
Most of the developed recreational areas lie north of the Eau Claire River within the park's boundaries. North of the river and west of a county highway that runs through the park are over 25 campsites (16 with electricity) and a swimming beach above a dam approximately a half-mile from the river gorge. North of the river and east of the highway are a group campground, three shelters, and a playground area. There are a number of nature trails that wind north and south of the river throughout the park.

== Danger and tragedy ==
A sign along the gorge warns park visitors: "Danger. Use only developed beach. Rocks – Undercurrent deadly." Between 1977 and 1995, four deaths were attributed to mishaps among the rocks and water of the gorge.
