= Bluff Siding, Wisconsin =

- Unincorporated community
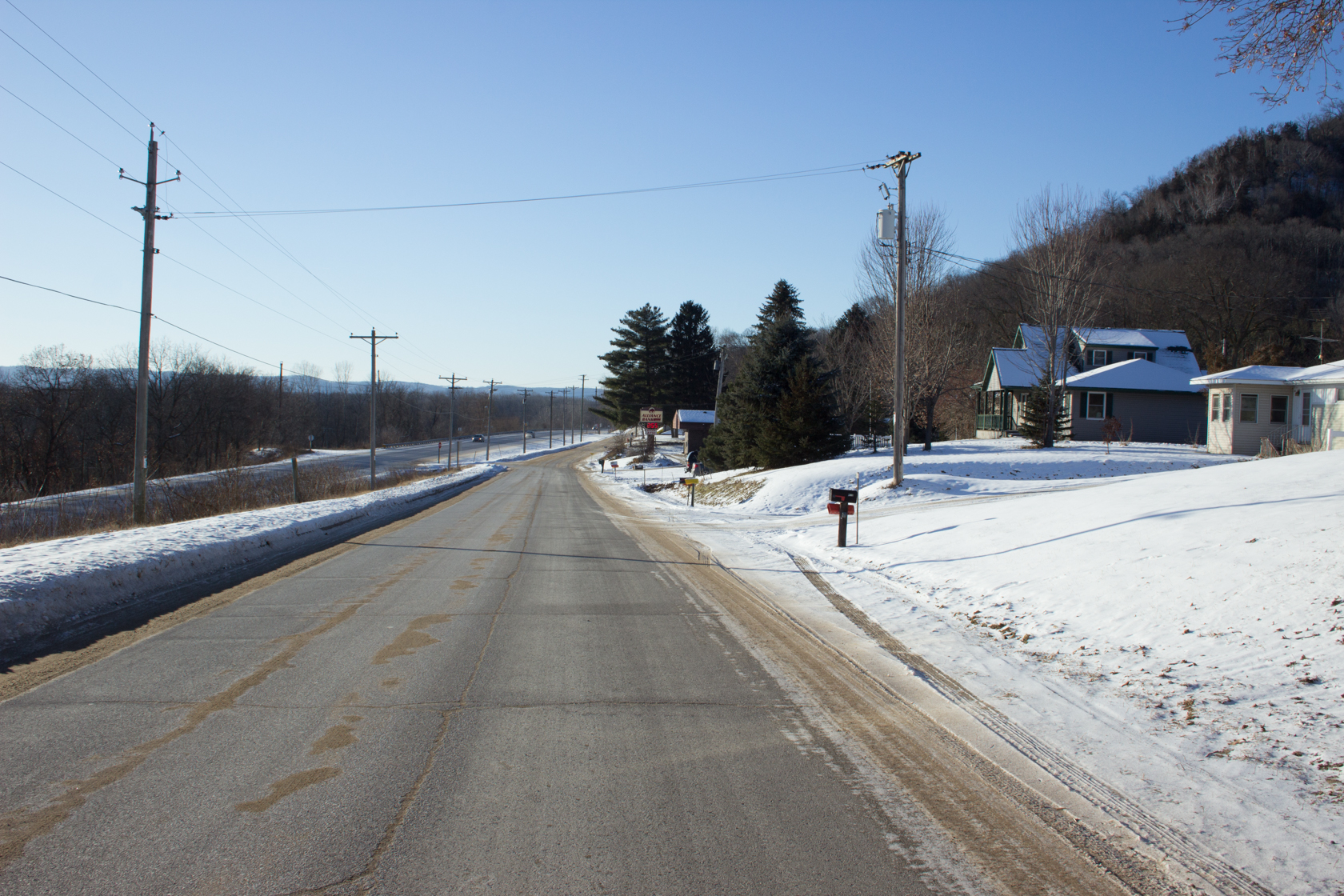
- Bluff Siding Road, Bluff Siding, Wisconsin

- Location within Wisconsin Location within the United States
- Coordinates: 44°04′17″N 91°37′05″W
- Country: United States
- State: Wisconsin
- County: Buffalo
- Town: Buffalo
- Elevation: 682 ft (208 m)
- Time zone: UTC-6 (Central (CST))
  - Summer (DST): UTC-5 (CDT)
- Area code: 608
- GNIS feature ID: 1561981

Bluff Siding or Atlanta Station is an unincorporated community located in the town of Buffalo, in Buffalo County, Wisconsin, United States.

Bluff Siding, a siding on the Chicago and North Western Railway, was named from rocky bluffs near the town site.

== Education ==
Bluff Siding is part of the Cochrane-Fountain City School District.

== Transportation ==
Bluff Siding, Wisconsin is located northeast of Winona, Minnesota on Wisconsin Highway 35 and Wisconsin Highway 54 on the Great River Road. Bluff Siding is 2.2 miles from Winona, Minnesota.

== Notable people ==
- Steve Drazkowski, Minnesota politician, grew up on a farm in Bluff Siding.

== Images ==
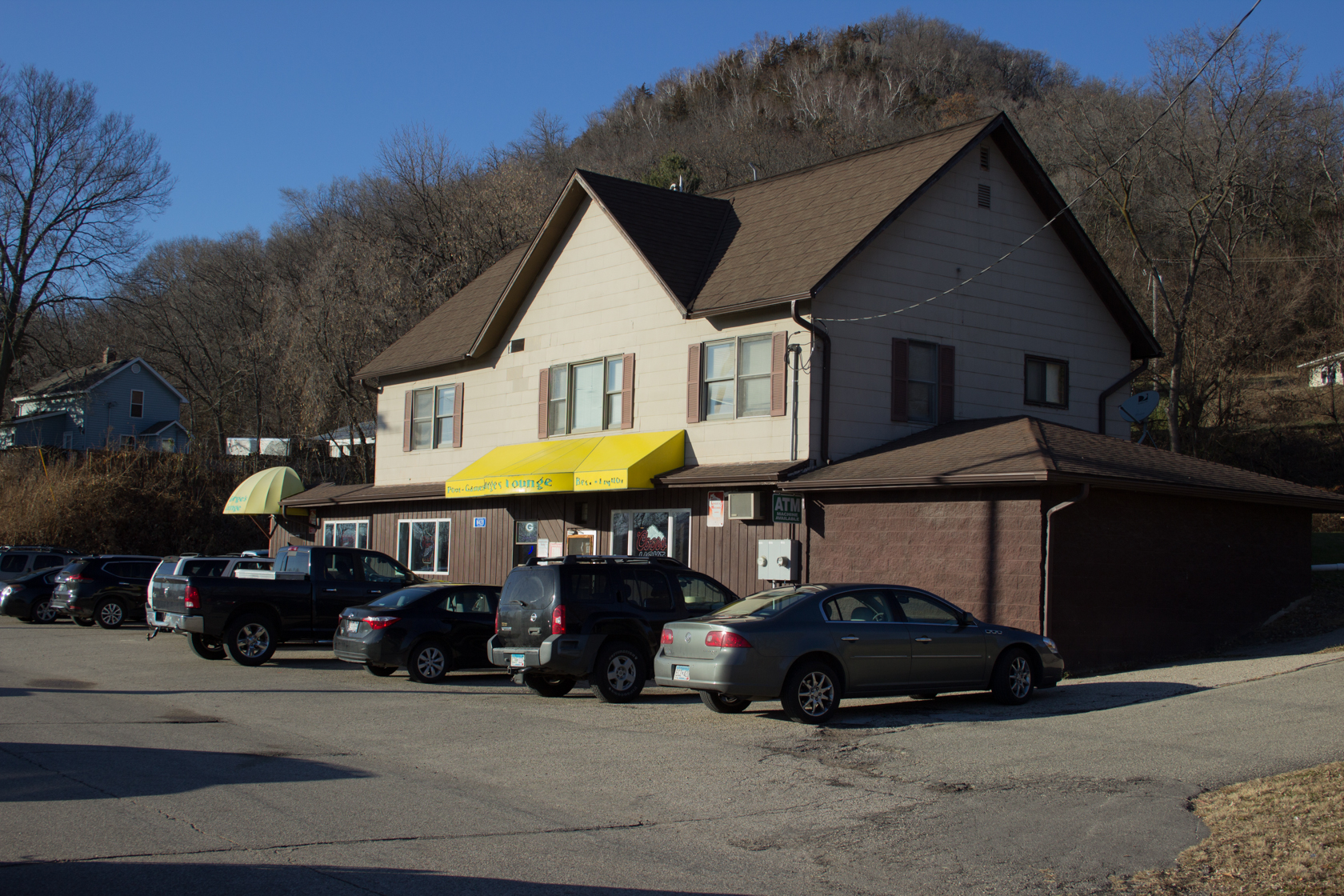
George's Lounge in Bluff Siding

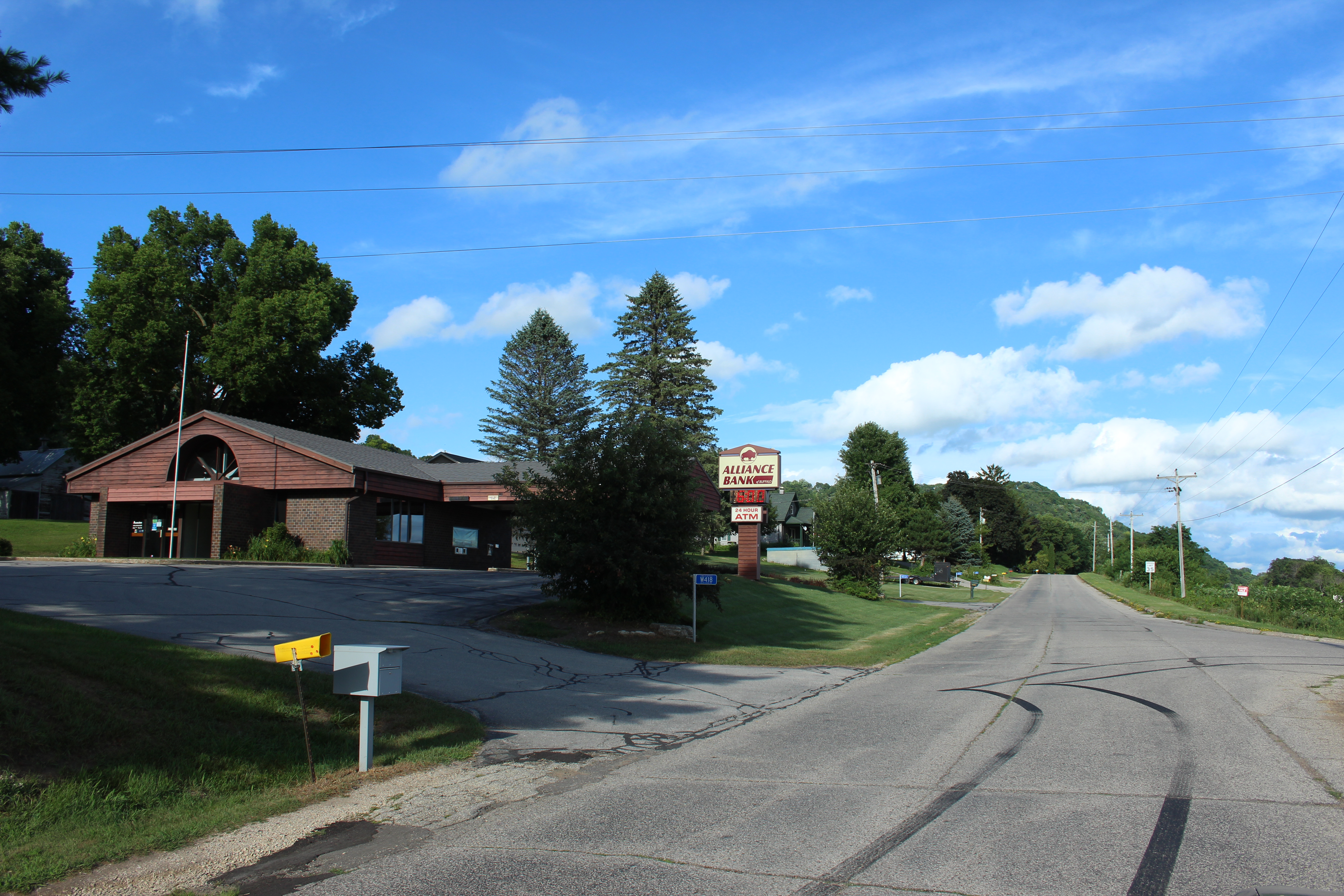
Alliance Bank of Buffalo, facing east

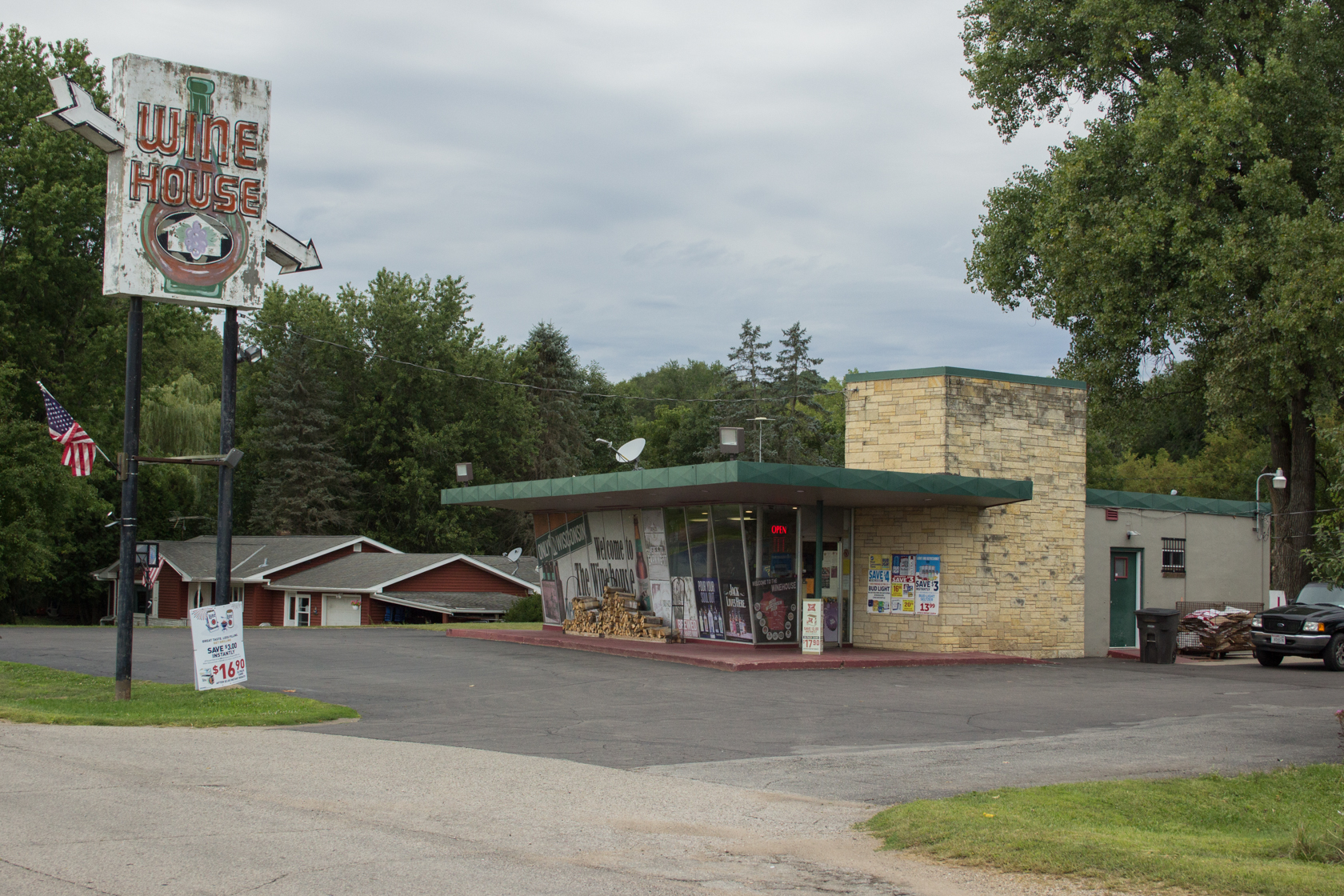
The Wine House liquor store

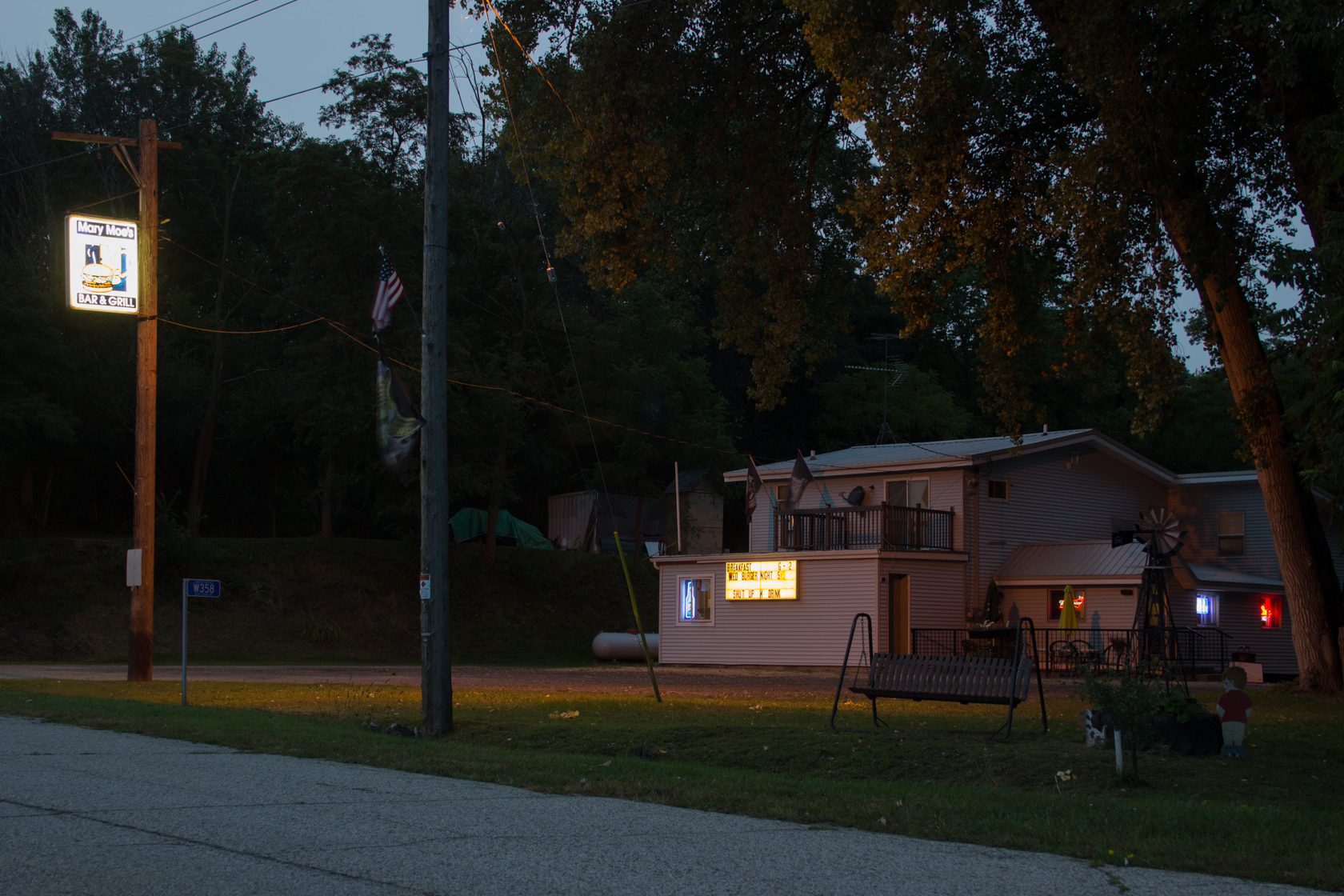
Mary Moe's Bar and Grill on Bluff Siding road

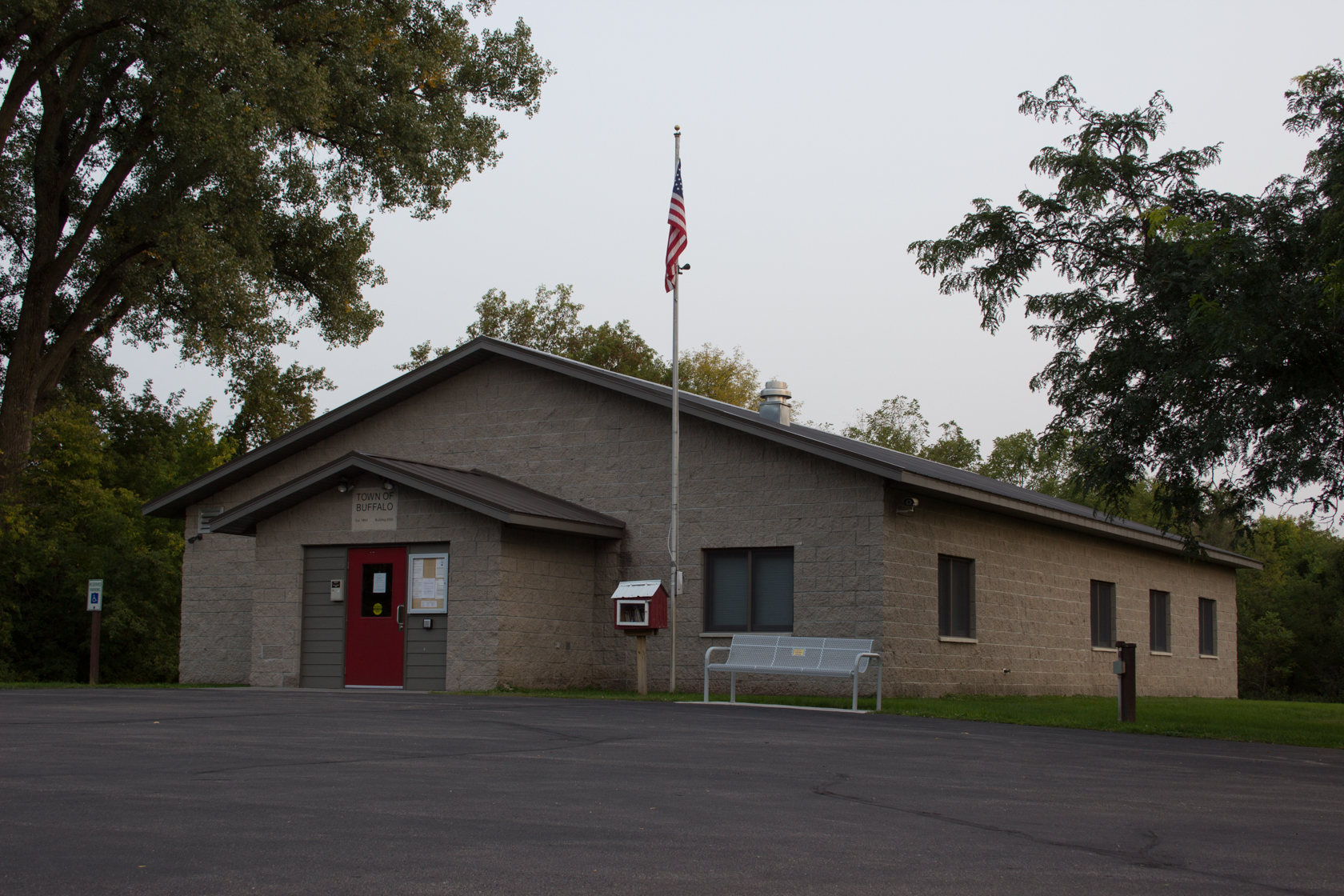
Town of Buffalo, Town Hall in Bluff Siding

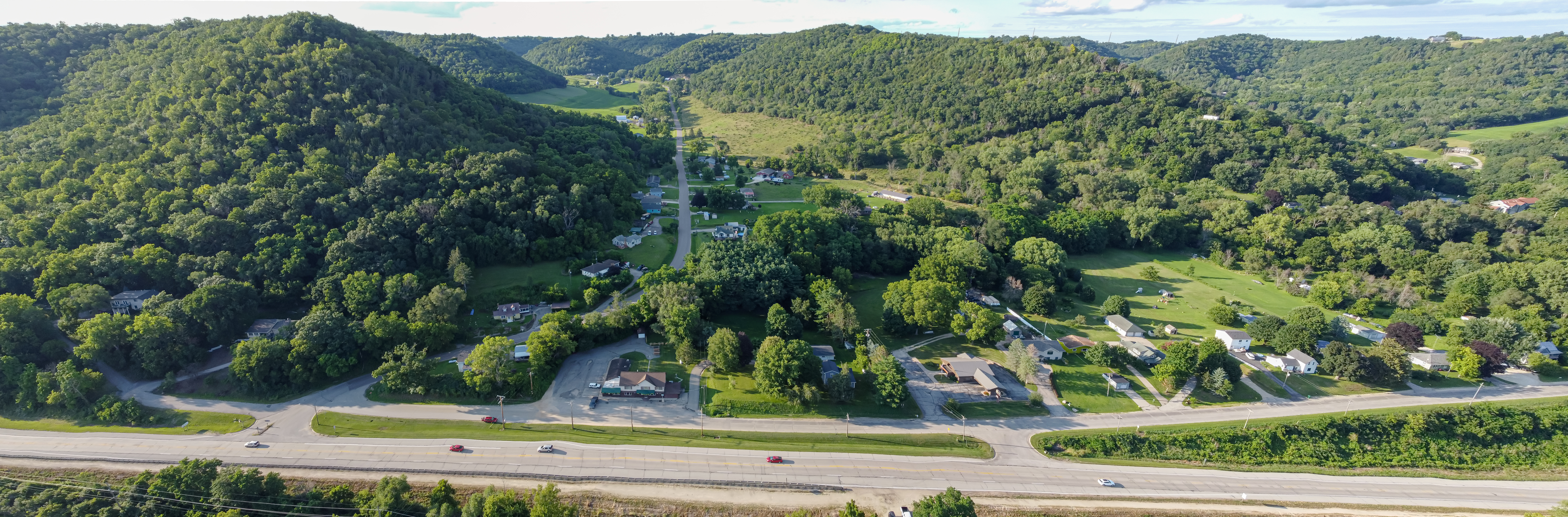
Wis-35 runs through town
