= Prescott Drawbridge =

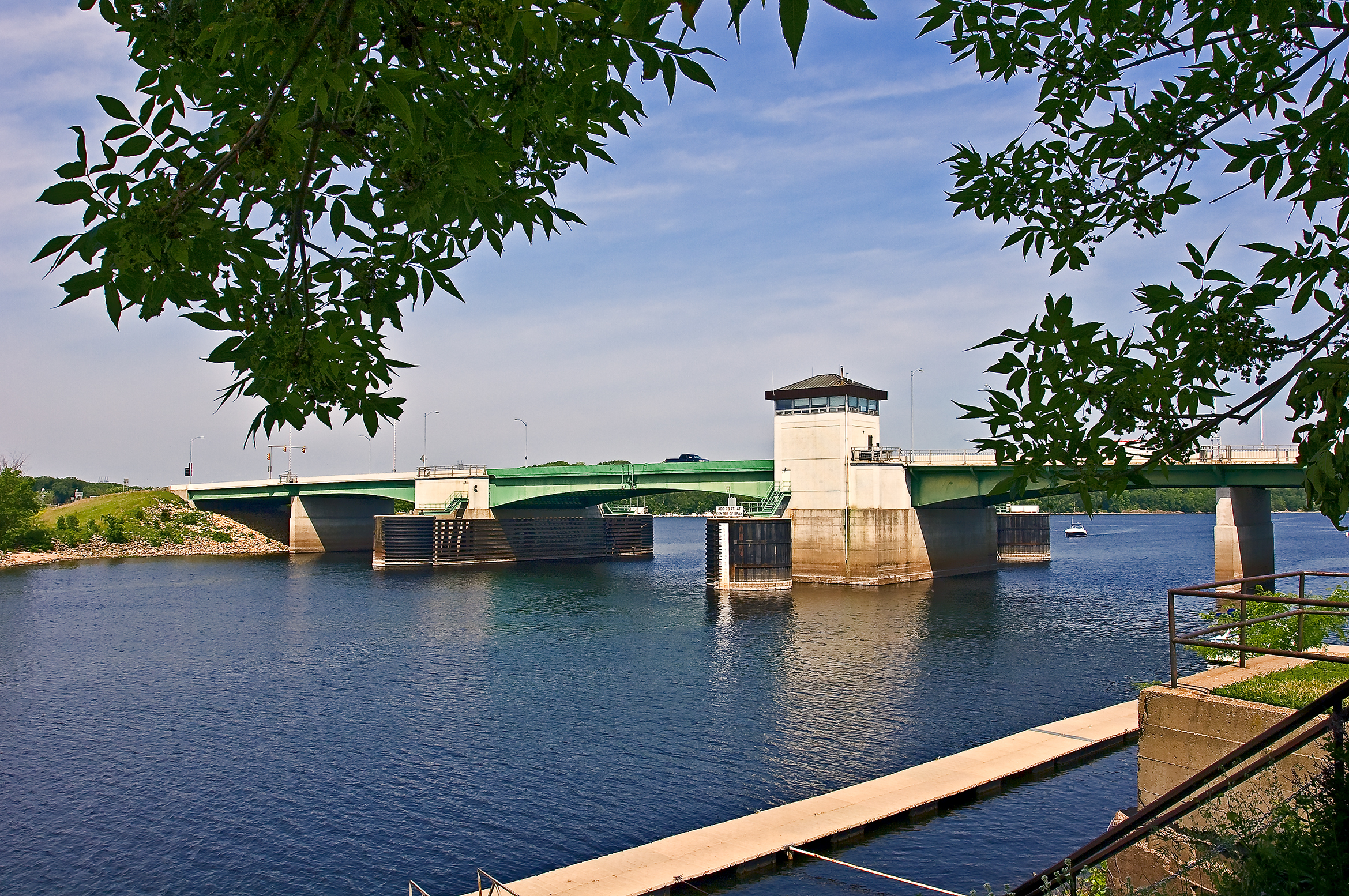
- The bridge in 2009
- Coordinates: 44°44′56″N 92°48′17″W
- Carries: US 10
- Crosses: St. Croix River (Wisconsin-Minnesota)
- Locale: Prescott, Wisconsin and Denmark Township, Minnesota
- Official name: Prescott Highway Bridge
- Other name(s): Prescott Drawbridge
- ID number: 82010

Characteristics
- Design: steel girder with double-leaf bascule draw span
- Total length: 672 feet (205 m)
- Width: 54 feet (16 m), 4 lanes
- Height: 20 feet (6.1 m)

History
- Opened: 1990

Statistics
- Daily traffic: 13000/day

The Prescott Drawbridge, also called the Point Douglas Drawbridge, is a steel girder bridge with a double-leaf bascule drawbridge section. The roadbed of the drawbridge span is a steel grate. The bridge carries U.S. 10 across the St. Croix River and connects Prescott, Wisconsin, with the Point Douglas park area of Denmark Township, Minnesota. This is the only highway drawbridge in the Minneapolis–Saint Paul area with active traffic. It was completed in 1990 and replaced a rare regional example of a Waddell & Harrington vertical-lift bridge completed in 1922 that operated as a toll bridge from 1923 to 1946. The environmental impact statement, published in 1979, considered a higher level fixed bridge at this location.

Adjacent to the road bridge, the BNSF Railway St. Croix Subdivision crosses the St. Croix river on a Vertical-lift bridge.

== Gallery ==
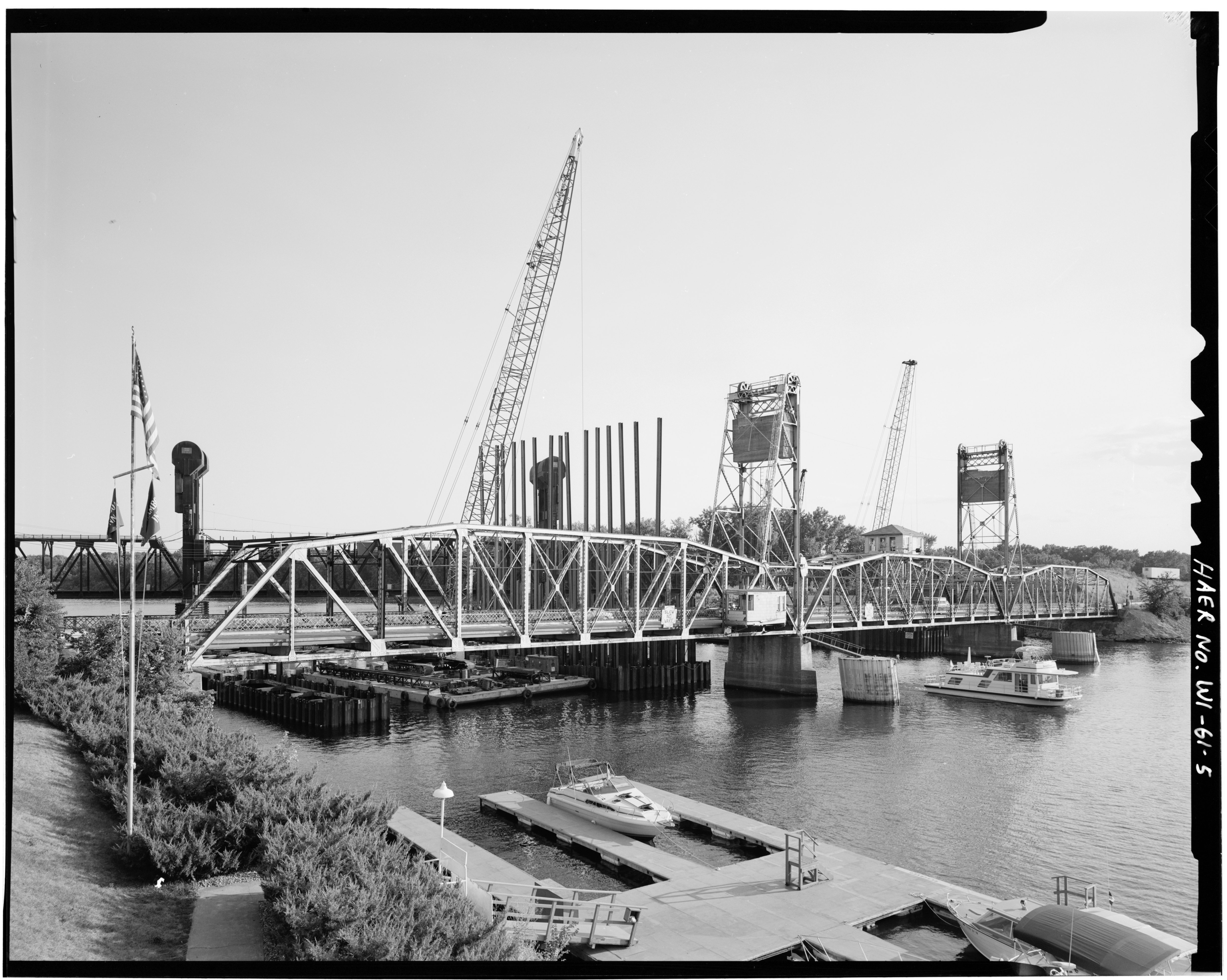
The 1922–1990 vertical lift bridge

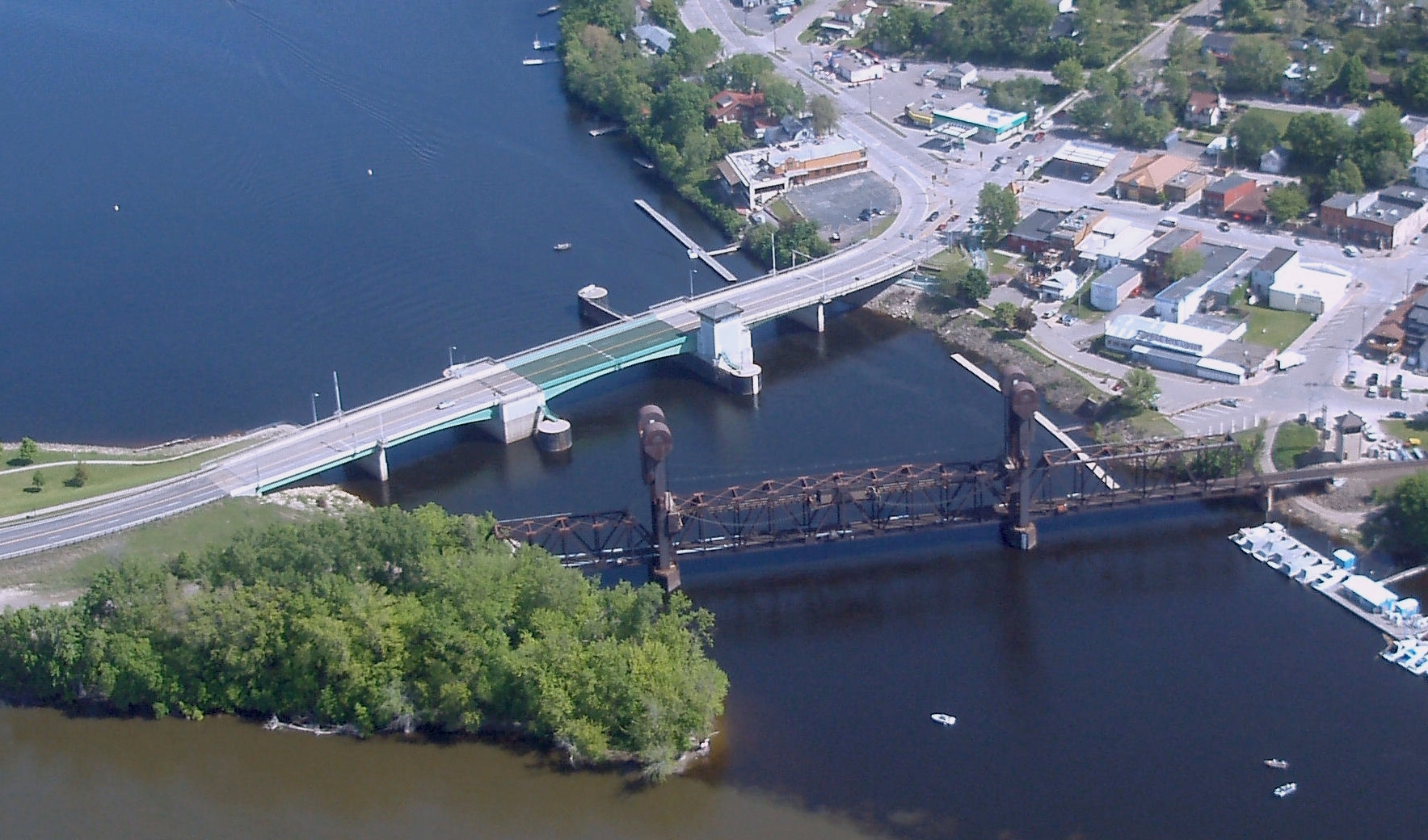
Aerial view of the 1990 bridge and adjacent BNSF Railway vertical-lift bridge

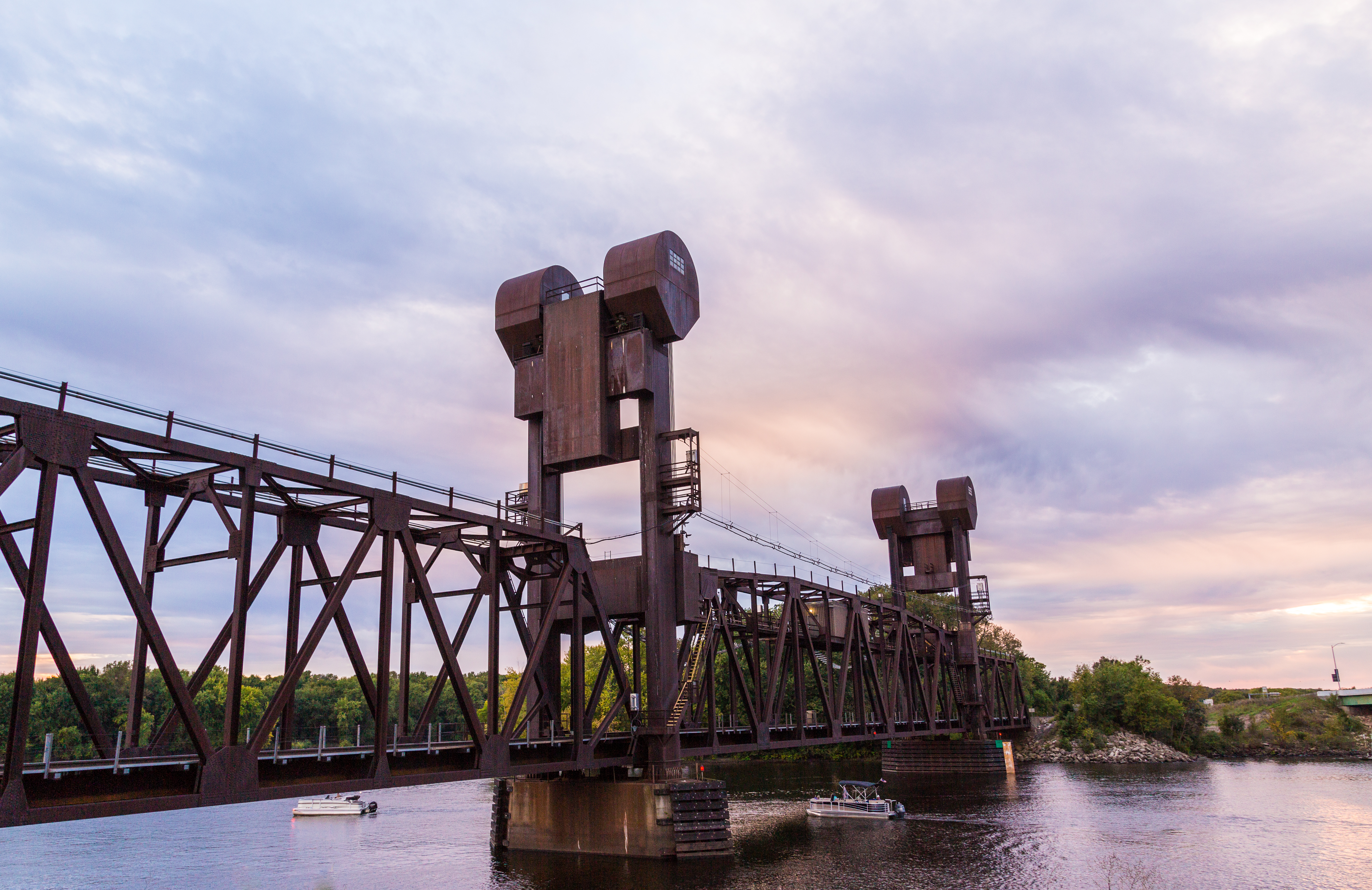
BNSF Lift Bridge, Prescott, Wisconsin

== See also ==
- List of bridges documented by the Historic American Engineering Record in Minnesota
- List of bridges documented by the Historic American Engineering Record in Wisconsin
