= East Winona, Wisconsin =

- Railroad Junction
- Location within Wisconsin Location within the United States
- Coordinates: 44°02′52″N 91°35′43″W
- Country: United States
- State: Wisconsin
- County: Buffalo
- Town: Buffalo
- Elevation: 656 ft (200 m)
- Time zone: UTC-6 (Central (CST))
  - Summer (DST): UTC-5 (CDT)
- Area code: 608
- GNIS feature ID: 1577584

East Winona is a railroad junction in Buffalo County, Wisconsin, United States, located where Canadian National Railway subsidiary Wisconsin Central Ltd.'s former Green Bay and Western Railroad line meets the BNSF Railway's St. Croix Subdivision. East Winona is located in the town of Buffalo.

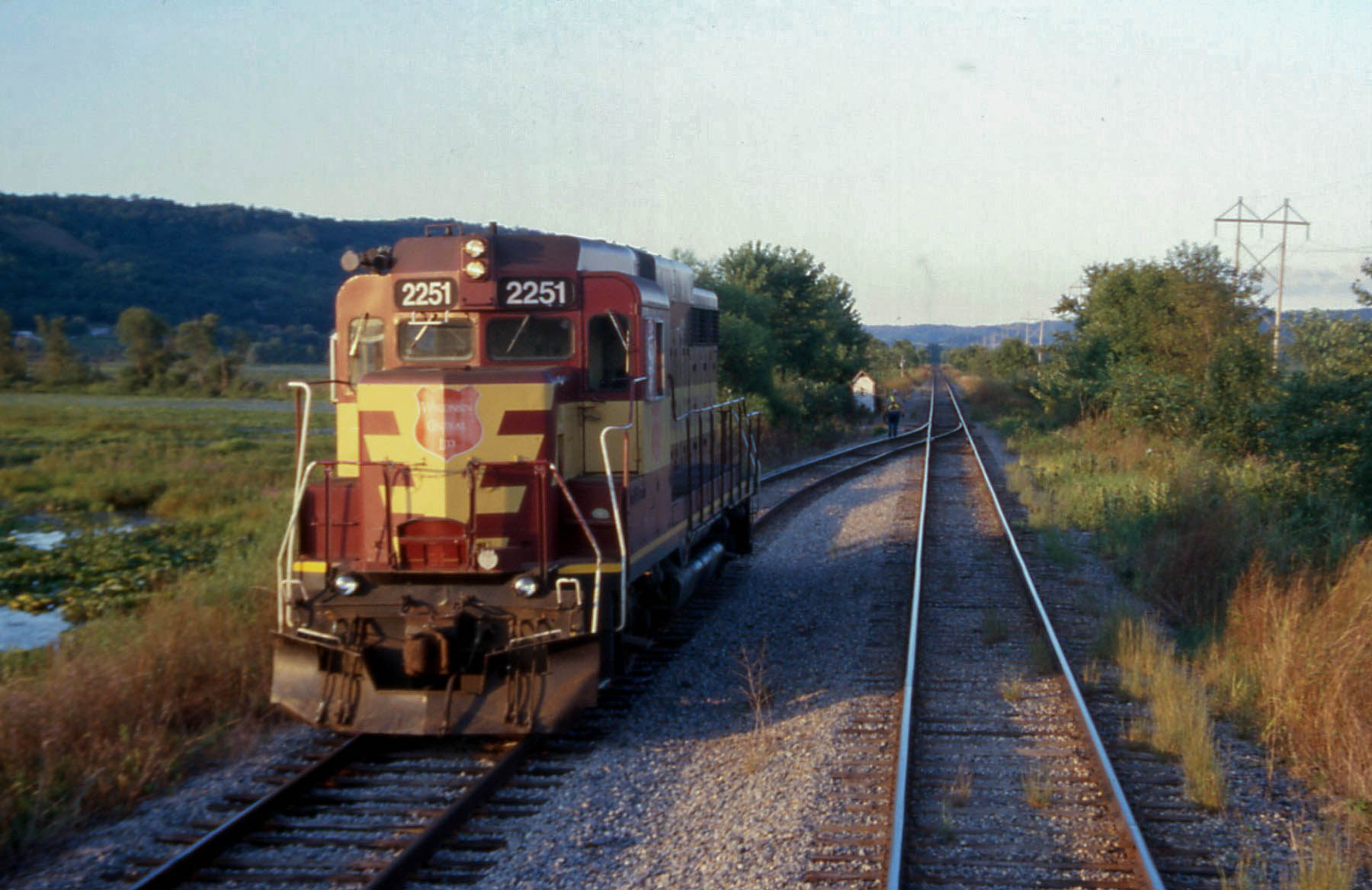

== Notes ==
Preceding station	Burlington Route	Following station
Fountain City toward Minneapolis	Minneapolis – Chicago	Trempealeau toward Chicago
