= Grand Avenue Bridge (Neillsville, Wisconsin) =

- Formerly listed on the U.S. National Register of Historic Places
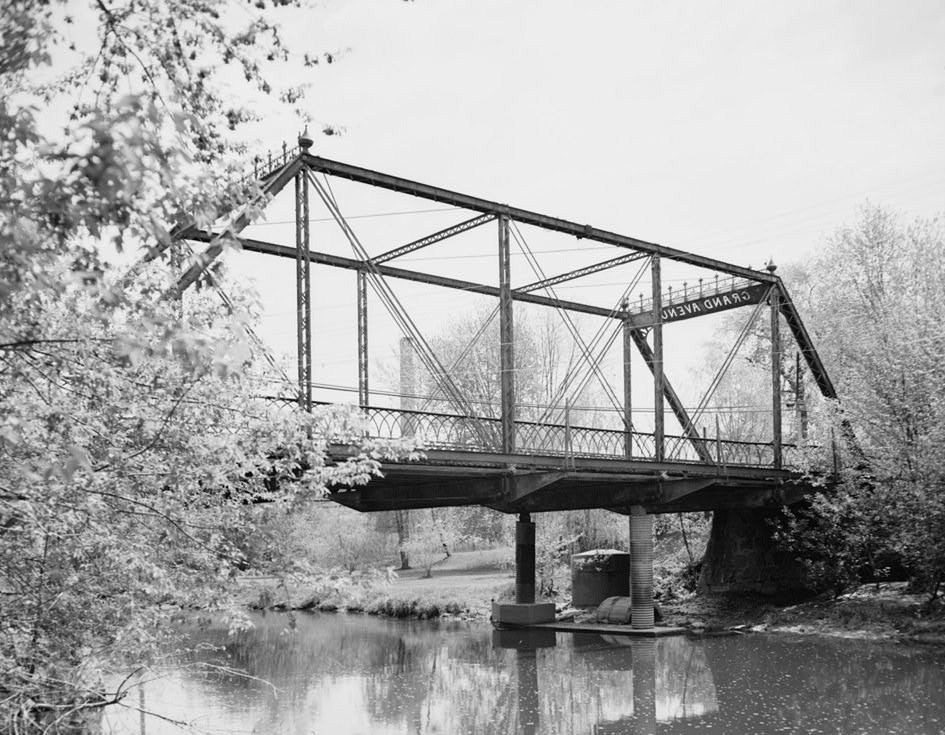
- Grand Avenue Bridge
- Location: Grand Avenue, Neillsville, Wisconsin
- Coordinates: 45°30′44″N 87°48′06″W
- Area: less than one acre
- Built: 1894
- Architect: Wisconsin Bridge and Iron Company
- Architectural style: Overhead Pratt truss
- NRHP reference No.: 84000688

Significant dates
- Added to NRHP: December 6, 1984
- Removed from NRHP: February 18, 1987

The Grand Avenue Bridge was located in Neillsville, Wisconsin. It was added to the National Register of Historic Places in 1984, but it was later demolished and it was removed from the register in 1987.

== See also ==
- List of bridges documented by the Historic American Engineering Record in Wisconsin
