= Osage =

The Osage Nation, a Native American tribe in the United States, is the source of most other terms containing the word "osage".

Osage can also refer to:

- Osage language, a Dhegihan language traditionally spoken by the Osage Nation
- Osage script, used for writing this language
- Osage (Unicode block), containing characters from the Osage script
- Osage-orange, Maclura pomifera, a tree of the mulberry family
- Osage Indian murders (1921–1925), a group of murders that took place on the Osage Indian Reservation as whites tried to get control of headrights to oil royalties
- Osage River, a tributary of the Missouri River, entirely contained in Missouri, United States
- Hughes TH-55 Osage U.S. Army helicopter
- USS Osage (1863)
- USS Osage (LSV-3)
- Osage Gallery, an art gallery in Hong Kong

Osage is a part of many placenames, including:

Canada

- Osage, Saskatchewan

United States

- Osage, Arkansas
- Osage, Iowa
- Osage, Minnesota
- Osage, New Jersey
- Osage, Ohio
- Osage, Oklahoma (also known as Osage City, Oklahoma)
- Osage, West Virginia (near Morgantown, West Virginia)
- Osage, Wyoming
- Osage Beach, Missouri
- Osage Bluff, Missouri
- Osage City, Kansas
- Osage Mills, Arkansas
- Osage County, Kansas
- Osage County, Missouri
- Osage County, Oklahoma, home of the Osage Indian Reservation
- Osage Township (disambiguation)
- Fort Osage (Independence, Missouri), a United States Army base built in 1808
