= Island Lake, Wisconsin =

- Unincorporated community
- Location within Wisconsin Location within the United States
- Coordinates: 45°19′08″N 91°22′09″W
- Country: United States
- State: Wisconsin
- County: Rusk
- Elevation: 1,083 ft (330 m)
- Time zone: UTC-6 (Central (CST))
  - Summer (DST): UTC-5 (CDT)
- Area codes: 715 and 534
- GNIS feature ID: 1567024

Island Lake is an unincorporated community located in the town of Big Bend, in Rusk County, Wisconsin, United States.

Originally known as Burpee's Place, Island Lake is located along Wisconsin Highway 40, on the northeastern shore of Island Lake, 10 miles south of the village of Bruce.

The community has a Church of Christ, along with the adjacent Island Lake Cemetery. The Big Bend Town Hall is located within the community.

Island Lake is located 19 miles southwest of Ladysmith.
