= Big Bend, Rusk County, Wisconsin =

Big Bend
- Town
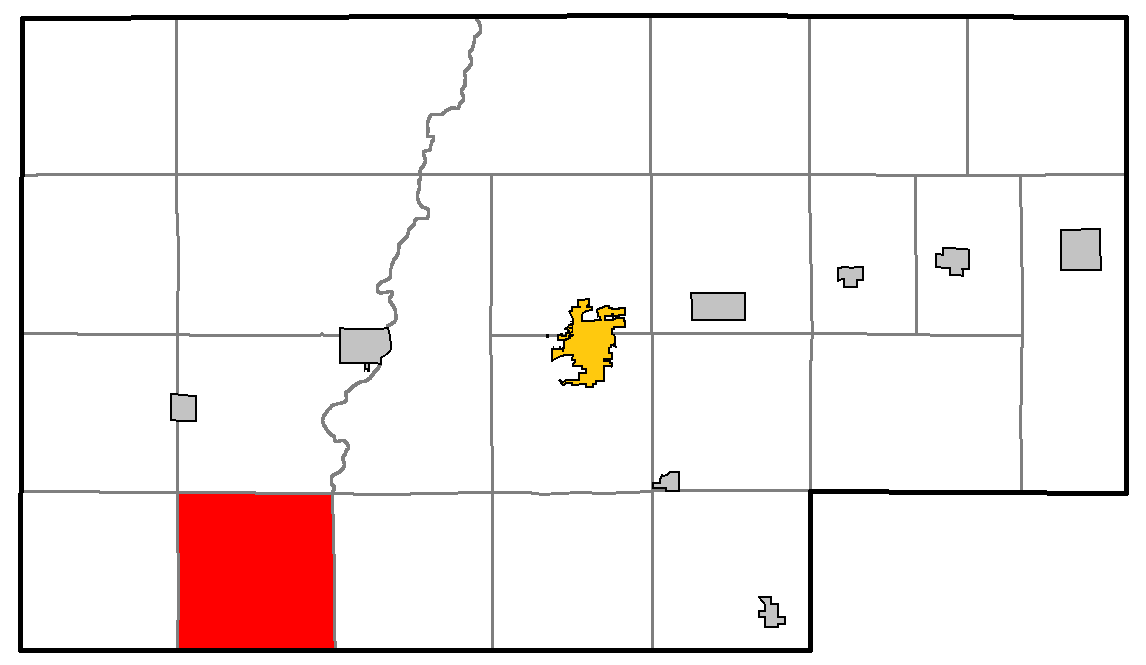
- Location of Big Bend, within Rusk County

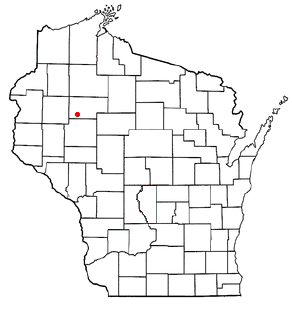
- Location of Big Bend, Wisconsin
- Coordinates: 45°19′47″N 91°22′3″W
- Country: United States
- State: Wisconsin
- County: Rusk

Area
  - Total: 35.3 sq mi (91.5 km^{2})
  - Land: 32.6 sq mi (84.5 km^{2})
  - Water: 2.7 sq mi (7.1 km^{2})
- Elevation: 1,079 ft (329 m)

Population (2020)
  - Total: 401
  - Density: 12.3/sq mi (4.75/km^{2})
- Time zone: UTC-6 (Central (CST))
  - Summer (DST): UTC-5 (CDT)
- Area codes: 715 & 534
- FIPS code: 55-07175
- GNIS feature ID: 1582805
- Website: http://www.townofbigbend.com

Big Bend is a town in Rusk County, Wisconsin, United States. The population was 423 as of the 2023 US census. The unincorporated community of Island Lake is located in the town.

== Geography ==
According to the United States Census Bureau, the town has a total area of 35.3 square miles (91.6 km^{2}), of which 32.6 square miles (84.5 km^{2}) is land and 2.7 square miles (7.1km^{2}) (7.72%) is water.

== Demographics ==
As of the census of 2000, there were 402 people, 184 households, and 121 families residing in the town. The population density was 12.3 people per square mile (4.8/km^{2}). There were 431 housing units at an average density of 13.2 per square mile (5.1/km^{2}). The racial makeup of the town was 98.76% White, 0.25% Native American, 0.25% Asian, and 0.75% from two or more races. Hispanic or Latino of any race were 0.25% of the population.

There were 184 households, out of which 17.4% had children under the age of 18 living with them, 55.4% were married couples living together, 6.0% had a female householder with no husband present, and 33.7% were non-families. 27.7% of all households were made up of individuals, and 11.4% had someone living alone who was 65 years of age or older. The average household size was 2.18 and the average family size was 2.63.

In the town, the population was spread out, with 16.2% under the age of 18, 5.0% from 18 to 24, 20.6% from 25 to 44, 36.8% from 45 to 64, and 21.4% who were 65 years of age or older. The median age was 51 years. For every 100 females, there were 113.8 males. For every 100 females age 18 and over, there were 118.8 males.

The median income for a household in the town was $29,063, and the median income for a family was $34,844. Males had a median income of $25,833 versus $21,964 for females. The per capita income for the town was $16,719. About 4.0% of families and 5.9% of the population were below the poverty line, including 5.5% of those under age 18 and 3.6% of those age 65 or over.
