= Buffalo, Buffalo County, Wisconsin =

Buffalo, Wisconsin
- Town
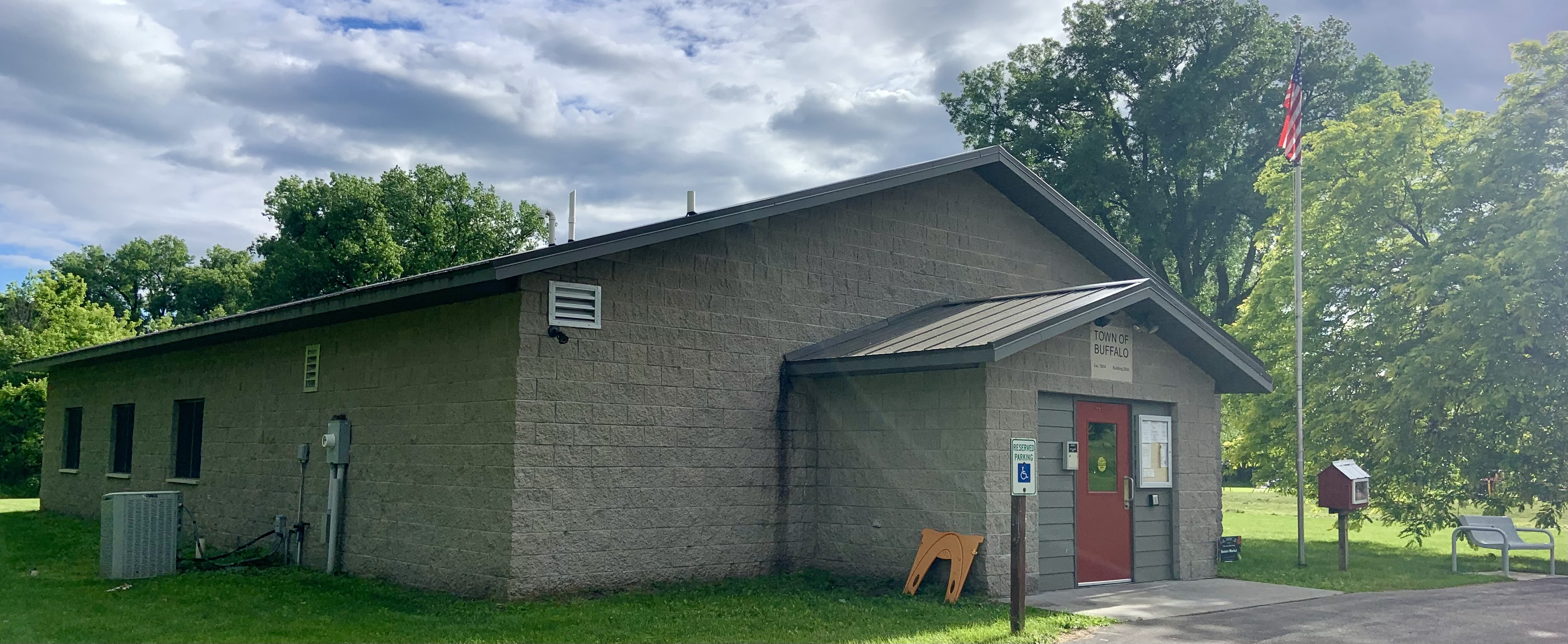
- Buffalo Town Hall

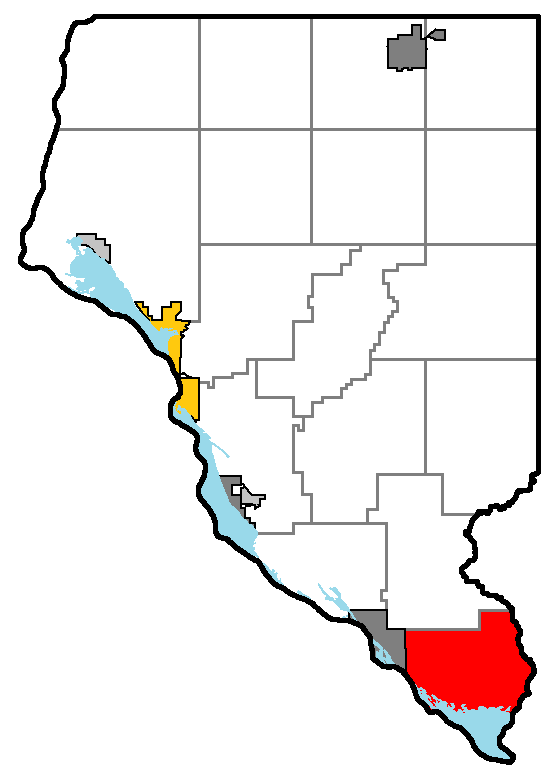
- Location of Buffalo, Buffalo County

- Location within Wisconsin
- Coordinates: 44°4′17″N 91°36′49″W
- Country: United States
- State: Wisconsin
- County: Buffalo

Area
  - Total: 34.2 sq mi (88.5 km^{2})
  - Land: 27.8 sq mi (72.1 km^{2})
  - Water: 6.3 sq mi (16.4 km^{2})
- Elevation: 1,120 ft (340 m)

Population (2020)
  - Total: 746
  - Density: 26.8/sq mi (10.3/km^{2})
- Time zone: UTC-6 (Central (CST))
  - Summer (DST): UTC-5 (CDT)
- FIPS code: 55-11025
- GNIS feature ID: 1582885
- Website: https://townofbuffalowi.com/

Buffalo is a town in Buffalo County in the U.S. state of Wisconsin. The population was 746 at the 2020 census. The unincorporated communities of Bluff Siding and Marshland, and East Winona railroad junction, are located in the town.

== Geography ==
Buffalo occupies the southern end of Buffalo County and is bordered by the Mississippi River, which forms the state line with Minnesota, to the southwest and by the Trempealeau River, which forms the border with Trempealeau County, to the east. The town is connected by the North Channel Bridge and Main Channel Bridge across the Mississippi River to the city of Winona, Minnesota. The city of Fountain City borders the northwestern edge of the town. The city of Buffalo City is unrelated to the town and is located 16 miles (26 km) to the northwest.

According to the United States Census Bureau, the town has a total area of 34.2 square miles (88.5 km^{2}), of which 27.8 square miles (72.1 km^{2}) is land and 6.3 square miles (16.4 km^{2}), or 18.53%, is water.

== Demographics ==
As of the census of 2010, there were 705 people, 285 households, and 205 families residing in the town. The population density was 22.3 people per square mile (8.6/km^{2}). There were 316 housing units at an average density of 8.15 per square mile. The racial makeup of the town was 97.90% White, 0.10% Native American, 0.40% Black or African American, 0.10% Asian, and 0.60% from two or more races. Hispanic or Latino of any race did not make up any of the population.

There were 285 households, out of which 25.6% had children under the age of 18 living with them, 66.3% were married couples living together, 3.9% had a female householder with no husband present, and 28.1% were non-families. 24.2% of all households were made up of individuals, and 7.8% had someone living alone who was 65 years of age or older. The average household size was 2.47 and the average family size was 2.95.

As of 2000, in the town, the population was spread out, with 23.5% under the age of 18, 6.0% from 18 to 24, 27.1% from 25 to 44, 29.4% from 45 to 64, and 13.9% who were 65 years of age or older. The median age was 41 years. For every 100 females, there were 109.7 males. For every 100 females age 18 and over, there were 112.5 males.

The median income for a household in the town was $44,750, and the median income for a family was $48,333. Males had a median income of $27,344 versus $22,321 for females. The per capita income for the town was $21,431. About 2.1% of families and 2.2% of the population were below the poverty line, including none of those under age 18 and 6.5% of those age 65 or over.

== History ==
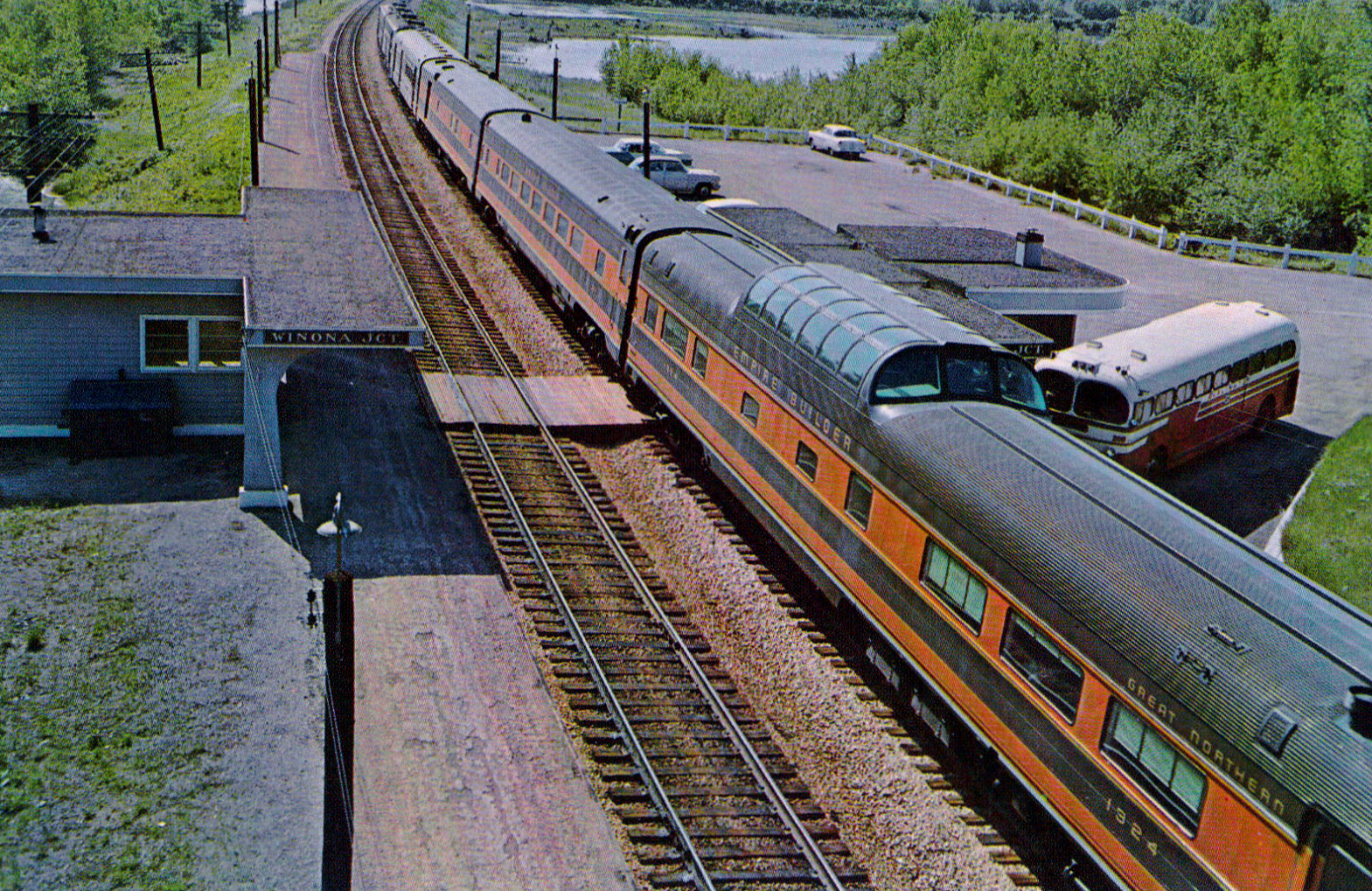
The Empire Builder at Winona Junction station in 1958

The Winona Junction rail station, a passenger station of the Chicago, Burlington and Quincy Railroad, was formerly located in the town. In older CB&Q timetables, this location was also known as Miner.

This station was first located at the crossing of the Chicago and North Western Railroad before it reached the Winona Rail Bridge. This is where the original approach road for the old wagon bridge ran. When the new Main Channel Bridge was constructed, and the wagon bridge removed, the Winona Junction station was moved to the Northwest, away from the actual crossing, along the CB&Q tracks near to the new approach road. The Flyway trail that opened in 2020 has a bridge that goes directly over the original East Winona junction of the two railroads.
