= Plover, Marathon County, Wisconsin =

Town of Plover, Wisconsin
- Town
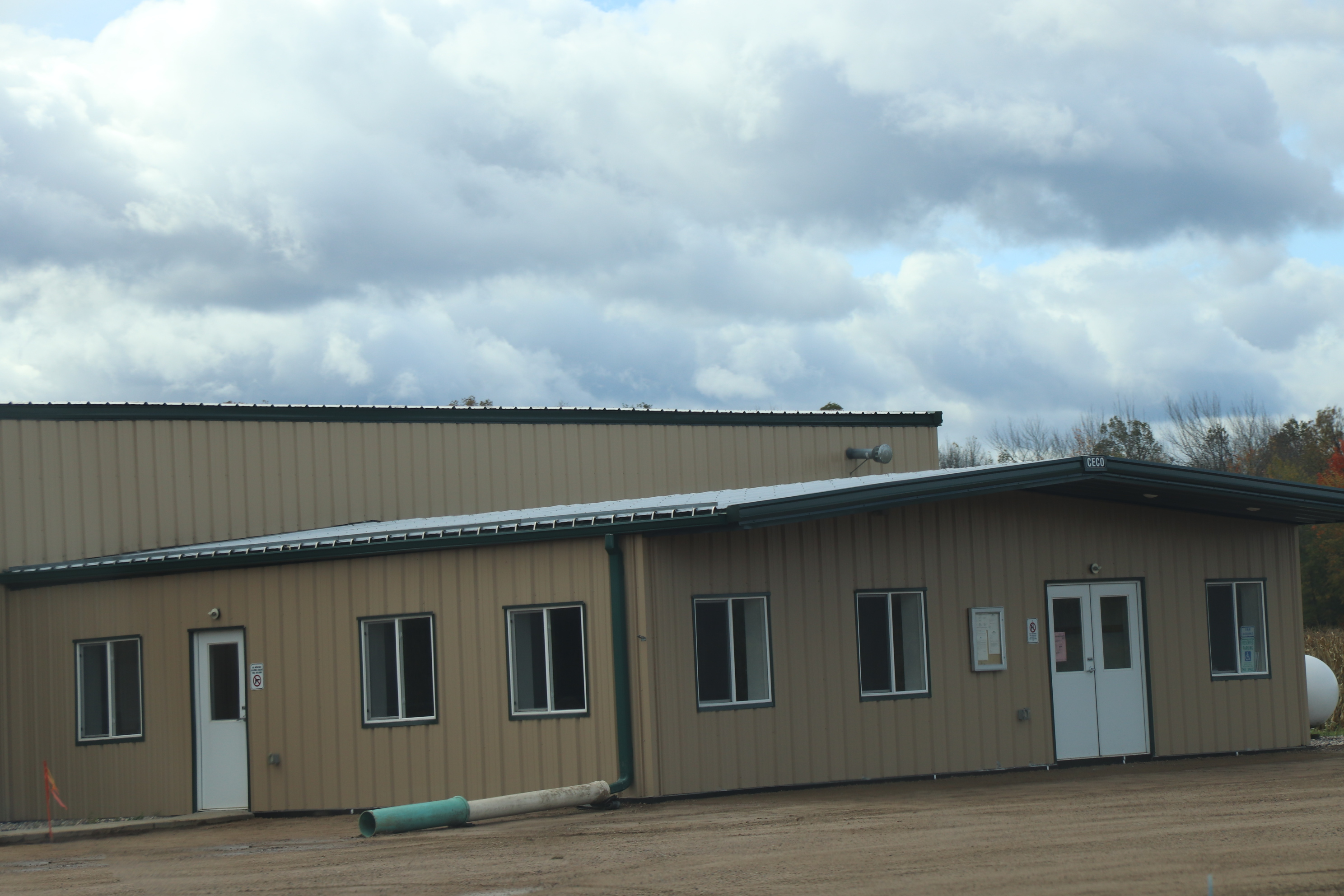
- Town hall

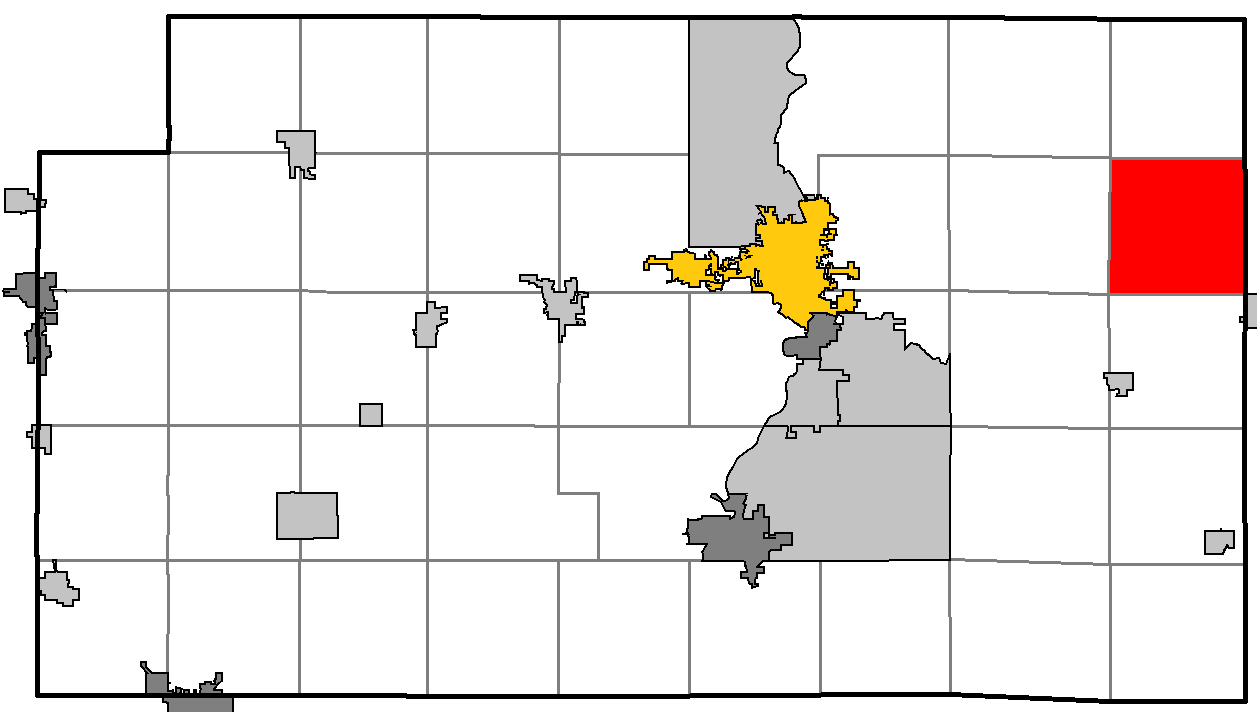
- Location of the Town of Plover, Marathon County

- Location of Marathon County, Wisconsin
- Coordinates: 44°59′47″N 89°16′41″W
- Country: United States
- State: Wisconsin
- County: Marathon

Area
  - Total: 36.2 sq mi (93.7 km^{2})
  - Land: 36.1 sq mi (93.6 km^{2})
  - Water: 0.039 sq mi (0.1 km^{2})
- Elevation: 1,329 ft (405 m)

Population (2020)
  - Total: 683
  - Density: 18.9/sq mi (7.30/km^{2})
- Time zone: UTC-6 (Central (CST))
  - Summer (DST): UTC-5 (CDT)
- Area codes: 715 & 534
- FIPS code: 55-63500
- GNIS feature ID: 1583940
- Website: townofplover.us

Plover is a town in Marathon County, Wisconsin, United States. It is part of the Wausau, Wisconsin Metropolitan Statistical Area. The population was 683 at the 2020 census. The unincorporated community of Hogarty is located partially in the town.

== Geography ==
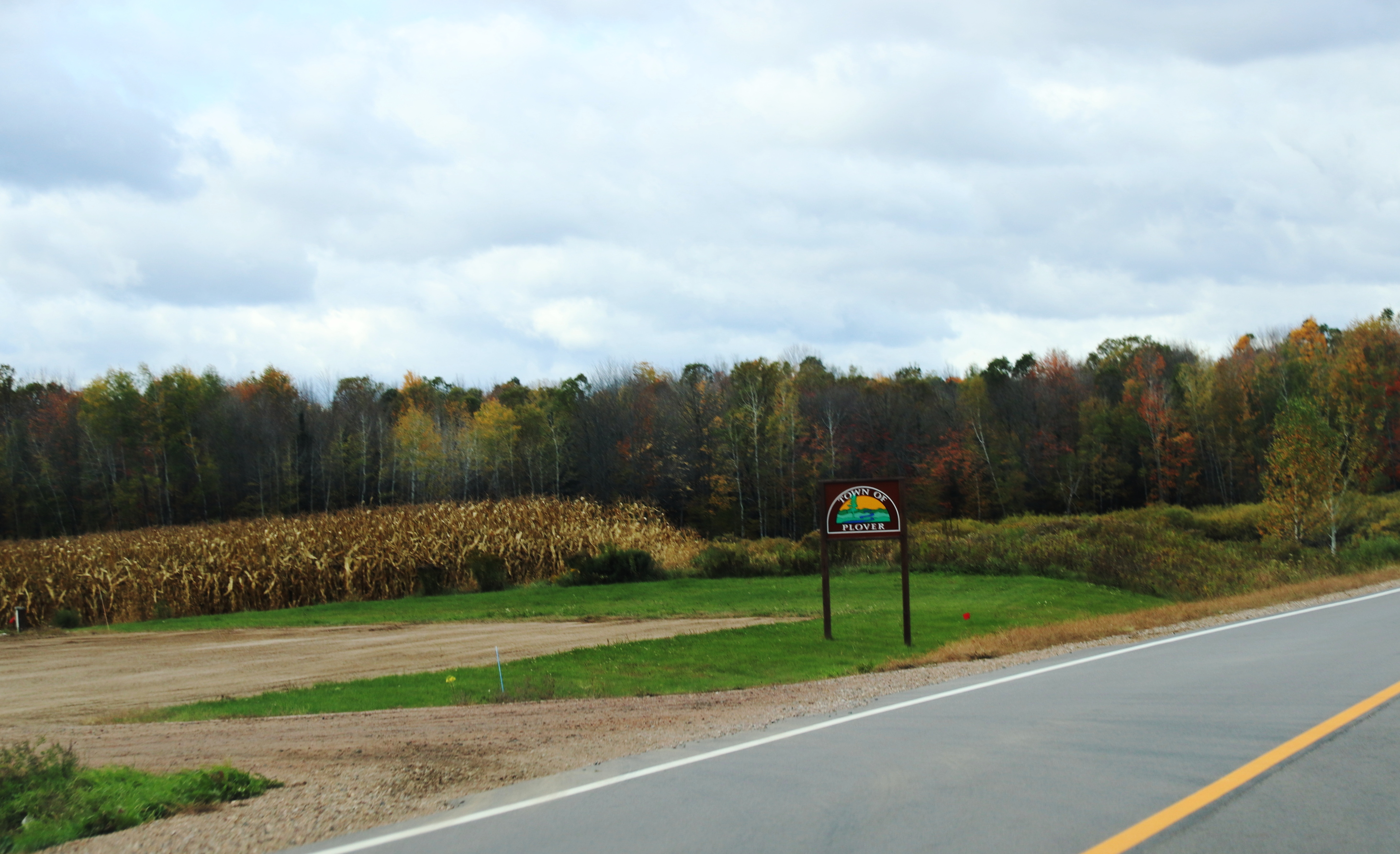
Entering the Town of Plover

According to the United States Census Bureau, the town has a total area of 36.2 square miles (93.8 km^{2}), of which 36.2 square miles (93.7 km^{2}) is land and 0.04 square miles (0.1 km^{2}), or 0.11%, is water.

== Demographics ==
At the 2000 census there were 686 people, 229 households, and 183 families living in the town. The population density was 19.0 people per square mile (7.3/km^{2}). There were 250 housing units at an average density of 6.9 per square mile (2.7/km^{2}). The racial makeup of the town was 97.81% White, 0.29% Native American, 1.75% Asian, and 0.15% from two or more races. Of the 229 households 39.7% had children under the age of 18 living with them, 71.6% were married couples living together, 5.2% had a female householder with no husband present, and 19.7% were non-families. 15.7% of households were one person and 7.9% were one person aged 65 or older. The average household size was 3.00 and the average family size was 3.40.

The age distribution was 32.1% under the age of 18, 6.4% from 18 to 24, 30.0% from 25 to 44, 21.1% from 45 to 64, and 10.3% 65 or older. The median age was 33 years. For every 100 females, there were 104.2 males. For every 100 females age 18 and over, there were 103.5 males.

The median household income was $42,250 and the median family income was $45,833. Males had a median income of $29,886 versus $26,042 for females. The per capita income for the town was $14,673. About 6.5% of families and 10.2% of the population were below the poverty line, including 10.5% of those under age 18 and 23.8% of those age 65 or over.

== Transportation ==
=== Airport ===
The Central Wisconsin Airport (KCWA) serves the town, the county and surrounding communities with both scheduled commercial jet service and general aviation services.
