= Elmer Township, Minnesota =

Elmer Township is the name of some places in the U.S. state of Minnesota:

- Elmer Township, Pipestone County, Minnesota
- Elmer Township, St. Louis County, Minnesota

== See also ==
- Elmer Township (disambiguation)
