= Cresson, Minnesota =

Cresson
- Unincorporated community
- Location within Minnesota Location within the United States
- Coordinates: 44°06′40″N 96°26′07″W
- Country: United States
- State: Minnesota
- County: Pipestone
- Elevation: 1,673 ft (510 m)
- Time zone: UTC-6 (Central (CST))
  - Summer (DST): UTC-5 (CDT)
- Area code: 507
- GNIS feature ID: 654655

Cresson is an unincorporated community located in Pipestone County, Minnesota, United States. The elevation is 1,673 feet. Cresson appears on the Elkton SW U.S. Geological Survey Map.

Close to the adjacent states of South Dakota to the west and Iowa to the south, Cresson lies in rural southwest Minnesota near the Pipestone National Monument, a National Park Service property established in 1937. The monument's 301 acres protect tallgrass prairie and quarries of red pipestone, or catlinite, traditionally used by Native Americans to make pipes.
