= Pipestone County Courthouse =

- U.S. National Register of Historic Places
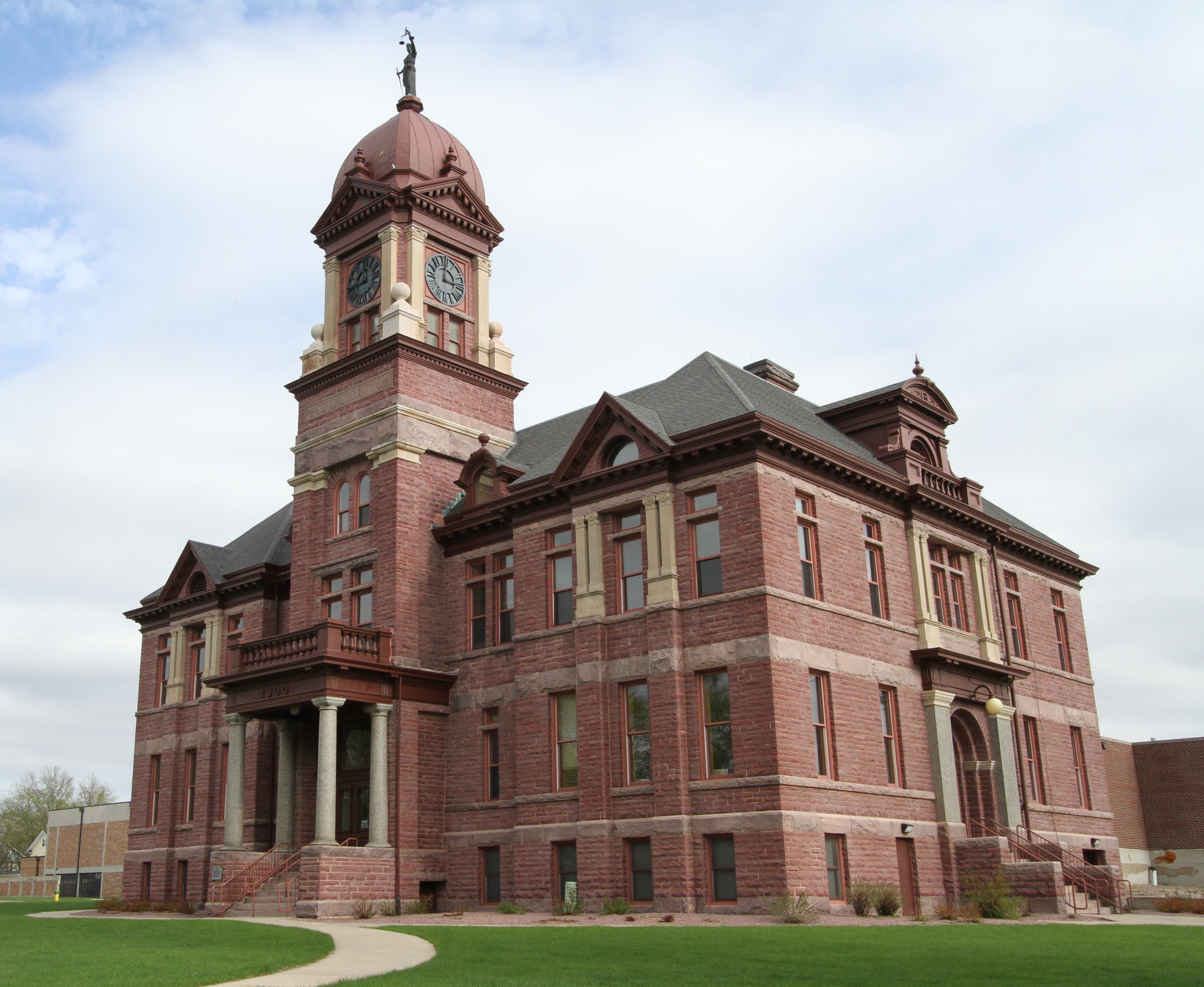

- Location within Minnesota Location within the United States
- Location: 416 S. Hiawatha, Pipestone, Minnesota
- Coordinates: 43°59′48″N 96°19′05″W
- Area: 3 acres (1.2 ha)
- Built: 1901
- Architect: George Pass, George S. Redmon
- Architectural style: Beaux Arts
- MPS: Pipestone County MRA
- NRHP reference No.: 80002121
- Added to NRHP: March 3, 1980

The Pipestone County Courthouse, located at 416 South Hiawatha in the city of Pipestone, Pipestone County in the U.S. state of Minnesota is a Beaux Arts style building featuring a Renaissance dome on a clock tower with heavily rusticated masonry and Sioux quartzite. A bronze Lady Justice stands on the dome. The interior is finished with elaborate oak woodwork. A multicolored mantle in the foyer was constructed from pipestone in a Native American motif. The building was constructed by C.H. Peltier of Faribault for $45,175.
