= Grange Township =

Grange Township may refer to:

- Grange Township, Woodbury County, Iowa
- Grange Township, Pipestone County, Minnesota
- Grange Township, Deuel County, South Dakota, in Deuel County, South Dakota

== See also ==
- LaGrange Township (disambiguation)
