= Gray Township =

Gray Township may refer to:

- Gray Township, Lonoke County, Arkansas, in Lonoke County, Arkansas
- Gray Township, White County, Illinois
- Gray Township, Pipestone County, Minnesota
- Gray Township, Stutsman County, North Dakota, in Stutsman County, North Dakota
- Gray Township, Greene County, Pennsylvania
