= Airlie, Minnesota =

Airlie
- Unincorporated community
- Location within Minnesota Location within the United States
- Coordinates: 44°01′12″N 96°26′17″W
- Country: United States
- State: Minnesota
- County: Pipestone
- Elevation: 1,660 ft (510 m)
- Time zone: UTC-6 (Central (CST))
  - Summer (DST): UTC-5 (CDT)
- Area code: 507
- GNIS feature ID: 654562

Airlie is an unincorporated community in Sweet Township, Pipestone County, Minnesota, United States. It is located near Minnesota State Highway 30 between Pipestone, Minnesota and Egan, South Dakota, one mile east of the Minnesota – South Dakota state line.

== History ==
Airlie was platted in 1879, and named for the Earl of Airlie. A post office was established at Airlie in 1882, and remained in operation until 1934.
