= Ralph E. Gryte =

American politician

Ralph Edward Gryte (January 3, 1903 – December 11, 1965) was an American politician and businessman.

Gryte was born in Ruthlon, Pipestone County, Minnesota. He lived in Ruthton, Minnesota. Gryte served in the Minnesota House of Representatives from 1933 to 1936. He was involved with the banking business and the office supply business.
