= Diamond Corner, Minnesota =

Diamond Corner
- Unincorporated community
- Location within Minnesota Location within the United States
- Coordinates: 43°59′38″N 96°06′14″W
- Country: United States
- State: Minnesota
- County: Pipestone
- Elevation: 1,791 ft (546 m)
- Time zone: UTC-6 (Central (CST))
  - Summer (DST): UTC-5 (CDT)
- Area code: 507
- GNIS feature ID: 654672

Diamond Corner is an unincorporated community in Burke Township, Pipestone County, Minnesota, United States.
