= Cazenovia, Minnesota =

Ghost town in Pipestone County, Minnesota, US

Cazenovia
- Unincorporated community
- Location within Minnesota Location within the United States
- Coordinates: 44°04′01″N 96°22′04″W
- Country: United States
- State: Minnesota
- County: Pipestone
- Elevation: 1,673 ft (510 m)
- Time zone: UTC-6 (Central (CST))
  - Summer (DST): UTC-5 (CDT)
- Area code: 507
- GNIS feature ID: 654636

Cazenovia is a former populated place in section 21 of Troy Township in Pipestone County, Minnesota, United States.

== History ==
Cazenovia was founded in 1884 by pioneers from Madison County, New York. It was named for a town and lake in said county. The town had a post office from 1885 until 1938, and had a station of the Chicago, Rock Island and Pacific Railway.
