= Osborne Township =

Osborne Township may refer to:

== Canada ==
- Osborne Township, Ontario

== United States ==
- Osborne Township, Sumner County, Kansas, in Sumner County, Kansas
- Osborne Township, Pipestone County, Minnesota
