= Severt B. Duea =

American politician

Severt Benjamin Duea (February 13, 1876 – March 2, 1956) was an American businessman and politician.

Duea was born in Story County, Iowa and attended the public schools there. He moved to Pipestone County, Minnesota in 1886 and then moved to Ruthton, Minnesota with his wife and family. Duea worked as a cashier in the First National Bank of Ruthton; he served as the village treasurer for Ruthton, Minnesota. Duea served as the secretary for the Governor of Minnesota J.A.O. Preus and served as the Minnesota Superintendent of Banks. In 1927, he moved to Redwood Falls, Minnesota. He served in the Minnesota House of Representatives in 1909 and 1910 and in the Minnesota Senate from 1911 to 1914. Duea was a Republican.
