= Rock Township, Pipestone County, Minnesota =

Rock Township, Minnesota
- Township
- Location within the state of Minnesota Rock Township, Minnesota (the United States)
- Coordinates: 44°4′34″N 96°8′4″W
- Country: United States
- State: Minnesota
- County: Pipestone

Area
  - Total: 35.9 sq mi (92.9 km^{2})
  - Land: 35.8 sq mi (92.6 km^{2})
  - Water: 0.077 sq mi (0.2 km^{2})
- Elevation: 1,791 ft (546 m)

Population (2000)
  - Total: 184
  - Density: 5.2/sq mi (2/km^{2})
- Time zone: UTC-6 (Central (CST))
  - Summer (DST): UTC-5 (CDT)
- FIPS code: 27-54916
- GNIS feature ID: 0665432

Rock Township is a township in Pipestone County, Minnesota, United States. The population was 184 at the 2000 census.

Rock Township was organized in 1879, and named for the Rock River.

== Geography ==
According to the United States Census Bureau, the township has a total area of 35.9 square miles (92.9 km^{2}), of which 35.8 square miles (92.6 km^{2}) is land and 0.1 square mile (0.2 km^{2}) (0.25%) is water.

== Demographics ==
As of the census of 2000, there were 184 people, 70 households, and 58 families residing in the township. The population density was 5.1 people per square mile (2.0/km^{2}). There were 74 housing units at an average density of 2.1/sq mi (0.8/km^{2}). The racial makeup of the township was 99.46% White and 0.54% Native American.

There were 70 households, out of which 28.6% had children under the age of 18 living with them, 72.9% were married couples living together, 5.7% had a female householder with no husband present, and 17.1% were non-families. 15.7% of all households were made up of individuals, and 4.3% had someone living alone who was 65 years of age or older. The average household size was 2.63 and the average family size was 2.88.

In the township the population was spread out, with 24.5% under the age of 18, 7.6% from 18 to 24, 25.5% from 25 to 44, 25.0% from 45 to 64, and 17.4% who were 65 years of age or older. The median age was 41 years. For every 100 females, there were 119.0 males. For every 100 females age 18 and over, there were 117.2 males.

The median income for a household in the township was $39,643, and the median income for a family was $45,750. Males had a median income of $22,143 versus $18,750 for females. The per capita income for the township was $16,874. About 10.5% of families and 15.5% of the population were below the poverty line, including 22.4% of those under the age of eighteen and 24.0% of those 65 or over.

== Politics ==
Rock Township is located in Minnesota's 1st congressional district, represented by Mankato educator Tim Walz, a Democrat. At the state level, Rock Township is located in Senate District 22, represented by Republican Doug Magnus, and in House District 22A, represented by Republican Joe Schomacker.
