= Ruthton, Minnesota =

City in Minnesota, United States

Ruthton
- City
- Location of Ruthton, Minnesota
- Coordinates: 44°10′39″N 96°06′12″W
- Country: United States
- State: Minnesota
- County: Pipestone

Government
  - Type: Mayor – Council
  - Mayor: Stan Townsend

Area
  - Total: 0.58 sq mi (1.51 km^{2})
  - Land: 0.58 sq mi (1.50 km^{2})
  - Water: 0.0039 sq mi (0.01 km^{2})
- Elevation: 1,729 ft (527 m)

Population (2020)
  - Total: 226
  - Density: 391.5/sq mi (151.14/km^{2})
- Time zone: UTC-6 (Central (CST))
  - Summer (DST): UTC-5 (CDT)
- ZIP code: 56170
- Area code: 507
- FIPS code: 27-56482
- GNIS feature ID: 2396459
- Website: https://ruthton-mn.com/

Ruthton is a city in Pipestone County, Minnesota, United States. As of the 2020 census, Ruthton had a population of 226.

The city is the home of Exelon Wind's Cowell Wind Project.

== History ==
Ruthton was platted in 1888, and named for the wife of a member of the town company. A post office has been in operation at Ruthton since 1888. Ruthton was incorporated in 1897.

== Geography ==
According to the United States Census Bureau, the city has a total area of 0.67 square miles (1.74 km^{2}), of which 0.66 square miles (1.71 km^{2}) is land and 0.01 square miles (0.03 km^{2}) is water.

The Redwood River flows through the city as an intermittent stream near its headwaters.

Minnesota State Highway 23 serves as a main route in the community.

== Demographics ==
Historical population
Census	Pop.	Note	%±
1900	323		—
1910	290		−10.2%
1920	403		39.0%
1930	387		−4.0%
1940	480		24.0%
1950	534		11.3%
1960	476		−10.9%
1970	405		−14.9%
1980	328		−19.0%
1990	328		0.0%
2000	284		−13.4%
2010	241		−15.1%
2020	226		−6.2%
U.S. Decennial Census

=== 2010 census ===
As of the census of 2010, there were 241 people, 110 households, and 67 families residing in the city. The population density was 365.2 inhabitants per square mile (141.0/km^{2}). There were 128 housing units at an average density of 193.9 per square mile (74.9/km^{2}). The racial makeup of the city was 99.2% White and 0.8% from two or more races. Hispanic or Latino of any race were 0.8% of the population.

There were 110 households, of which 25.5% had children under the age of 18 living with them, 49.1% were married couples living together, 6.4% had a female householder with no husband present, 5.5% had a male householder with no wife present, and 39.1% were non-families. 30.9% of all households were made up of individuals, and 10.9% had someone living alone who was 65 years of age or older. The average household size was 2.19 and the average family size was 2.76.

The median age in the city was 43.3 years. 22.4% of residents were under the age of 18; 7.1% were between the ages of 18 and 24; 21.9% were from 25 to 44; 34.5% were from 45 to 64; and 14.1% were 65 years of age or older. The gender makeup of the city was 49.8% male and 50.2% female.

=== 2000 census ===
As of the census of 2000, there were 284 people, 129 households, and 82 families residing in the city. The population density was 419.8 inhabitants per square mile (162.1/km^{2}). There were 145 housing units at an average density of 214.3 per square mile (82.7/km^{2}). The racial makeup of the city was 97.54% White, 1.06% African American, 0.35% Native American, 0.35% Asian, and 0.70% from two or more races.

There were 129 households, out of which 27.9% had children under the age of 18 living with them, 53.5% were married couples living together, 8.5% had a female householder with no husband present, and 35.7% were non-families. 34.1% of all households were made up of individuals, and 18.6% had someone living alone who was 65 years of age or older. The average household size was 2.20 and the average family size was 2.80.

In the city, the population was spread out, with 23.6% under the age of 18, 7.7% from 18 to 24, 26.4% from 25 to 44, 23.9% from 45 to 64, and 18.3% who were 65 years of age or older. The median age was 38 years. For every 100 females, there were 97.2 males. For every 100 females age 18 and over, there were 88.7 males.

The median income for a household in the city was $26,250, and the median income for a family was $33,125. Males had a median income of $25,875 versus $18,125 for females. The per capita income for the city was $13,016. About 10.0% of families and 15.0% of the population were below the poverty line, including 23.7% of those under the age of eighteen and 27.3% of those 65 or over.

== Politics ==
Ruthton is located in Minnesota's 7th congressional district, represented by Collin Peterson, a Democrat. At the state level, Ruthton is located in Senate District 22, represented by Republican Bill Weber, and in House District 22A, represented by Republican Joe Schomacker.

== Ruthton murders ==
Final Harvest: An American Tragedy, by New York Times reporter Andrew H. Malcolm, is about the farm crisis of the 1970s and the murder of two Ruthton bankers by a man who had lost his farm, Jim Jenkins, on September 29, 1983. Jenkins, along with his son, Steve, managed to lure the president of the Buffalo Ridge State Bank in Ruthton, Rudy Blythe Jr., and the bank's loan officer, Toby Thulin, onto a lonely farmhouse road. Jenkins murdered both bankers, then fled to Texas, where he walked into an open field, carefully took his eyeglasses off, put a shotgun into his mouth and pulled the trigger. Steve Jenkins later stood trial in Minnesota on accessory charges.

== Notable people ==
- Todd Bouman, American football player
- Severt B. Duea, Minnesota state legislator
- Ralph E. Gryte, Minnesota state legislator
