= Fountain Prairie Township, Pipestone County, Minnesota =

Fountain Prairie Township, Minnesota
- Township
- Location within the state of Minnesota Fountain Prairie Township, Minnesota (the United States)
- Coordinates: 44°9′22″N 96°14′22″W
- Country: United States
- State: Minnesota
- County: Pipestone

Area
  - Total: 37.2 sq mi (96.3 km^{2})
  - Land: 37.2 sq mi (96.3 km^{2})
  - Water: 0 sq mi (0.0 km^{2})
- Elevation: 1,800 ft (550 m)

Population (2000)
  - Total: 199
  - Density: 5.4/sq mi (2.1/km^{2})
- Time zone: UTC-6 (Central (CST))
  - Summer (DST): UTC-5 (CDT)
- FIPS code: 27-22130
- GNIS feature ID: 0664209

Fountain Prairie Township is a township in Pipestone County, Minnesota, United States. The population was 199 at the 2000 census.

Fountain Prairie Township was organized in 1879, and named after Fountain Prairie, Wisconsin, by a settler from that place.

== Geography ==
According to the United States Census Bureau, the township has a total area of 37.2 square miles (96 km^{2}), all land.

== Demographics ==
As of the census of 2000, there were 199 people, 70 households, and 59 families residing in the township. The population density was 5.4 inhabitants per square mile (2.1/km^{2}). There were 73 housing units at an average density of 2.0 per square mile (0.77/km^{2}). The racial makeup of the township was 100.00% White.

There were 70 households, out of which 44.3% had children under the age of 18 living with them, 78.6% were married couples living together, 2.9% had a female householder with no husband present, and 15.7% were non-families. 12.9% of all households were made up of individuals, and 2.9% had someone living alone who was 65 years of age or older. The average household size was 2.84 and the average family size was 3.14.

In the township the population was spread out, with 32.2% under the age of 18, 4.0% from 18 to 24, 30.7% from 25 to 44, 20.1% from 45 to 64, and 13.1% who were 65 years of age or older. The median age was 34 years. For every 100 females, there were 93.2 males. For every 100 females age 18 and over, there were 98.5 males.

The median income for a household in the township was $29,375, and the median income for a family was $29,792. Males had a median income of $25,313 versus $17,031 for females. The per capita income for the township was $11,669. About 21.6% of families and 16.5% of the population were below the poverty line, including 5.1% of those under the age of eighteen and 27.8% of those 65 or over.

== Politics ==
Fountain Prairie Township is located in Minnesota's 7th congressional district, represented by Collin Peterson, a Democrat. At the state level, the township is located in Senate District 22, represented by Republican Bill Weber, and in House District 22A, represented by Republican Joe Schomacker.
