= Altona Township, Pipestone County, Minnesota =

Altona Township, Minnesota
- Township
- Location within the state of Minnesota Altona Township, Minnesota (the United States)
- Coordinates: 44°9′7″N 96°23′6″W
- Country: United States
- State: Minnesota
- County: Pipestone

Area
  - Total: 43.1 sq mi (111.5 km^{2})
  - Land: 43.1 sq mi (111.5 km^{2})
  - Water: 0 sq mi (0.0 km^{2})
- Elevation: 1,683 ft (513 m)

Population (2000)
  - Total: 192
  - Density: 4.4/sq mi (1.7/km^{2})
- Time zone: UTC-6 (Central (CST))
  - Summer (DST): UTC-5 (CDT)
- FIPS code: 27-01216
- GNIS feature ID: 0663421

Altona Township is a township in Pipestone County, Minnesota, United States. The population was 192 at the 2000 census.

Altona Township was organized in 1880, and named after Altoona, Pennsylvania.

== Geography ==
According to the United States Census Bureau, the township has a total area of 43.0 square miles (111 km^{2}), all land.

== Demographics ==
As of the census of 2000, there were 192 people, 63 households, and 51 families residing in the township. The population density was 4.5 inhabitants per square mile (1.7/km^{2}). There were 69 housing units at an average density of 1.6 per square mile (0.62/km^{2}). The racial makeup of the township was 100.00% White.

There were 63 households, out of which 47.6% had children under the age of 18 living with them, 74.6% were married couples living together, 3.2% had a female householder with no husband present, and 19.0% were non-families. 19.0% of all households were made up of individuals, and 9.5% had someone living alone who was 65 years of age or older. The average household size was 3.05 and the average family size was 3.53.

In the township the population was spread out, with 36.5% under the age of 18, 6.3% from 18 to 24, 24.5% from 25 to 44, 20.3% from 45 to 64, and 12.5% who were 65 years of age or older. The median age was 33 years. For every 100 females, there were 97.9 males. For every 100 females age 18 and over, there were 106.8 males.

The median income for a household in the township was $26,250, and the median income for a family was $30,833. Males had a median income of $23,125 versus $18,750 for females. The per capita income for the township was $12,140. About 8.3% of families and 13.6% of the population were below the poverty line, including 22.4% of those under the age of eighteen and 9.5% of those sixty five or over.

== Politics ==
Altona Township is located in Minnesota's 1st congressional district, represented by Mankato educator Tim Walz, a Democrat. At the state level, Altona Township is located in Senate District 22, represented by Republican Doug Magnus, and in House District 22A, represented by Republican Joe Schomacker.
