= Ceremonial pipe =

Ceremonial smoking pipe, used by Indigenous peoples of North America

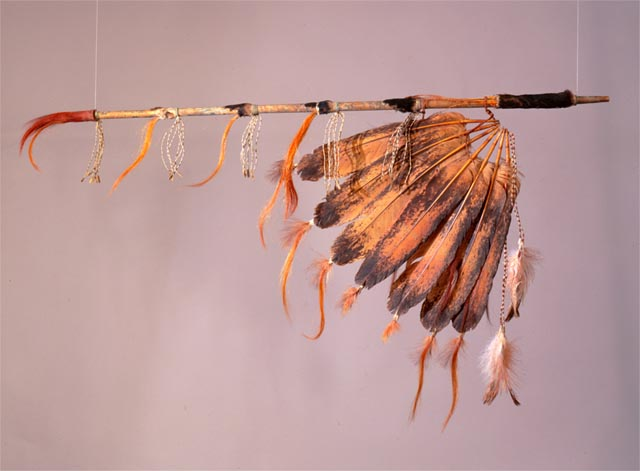
A pipestem from the upper Missouri River area, without the pipe bowl, from the collection of the Peabody Museum of Archaeology and Ethnology.

A ceremonial pipe is a particular type of smoking pipe, used by a number of cultures of the Indigenous peoples of the Americas in their sacred ceremonies. Traditionally they are used to offer prayers in a religious ceremony, to make a ceremonial commitment, or to seal a covenant or treaty. The pipe ceremony may be a component of a larger ceremony, or held as a sacred ceremony in and of itself. Indigenous peoples of the Americas who use ceremonial pipes have names for them in each culture's Indigenous language. Not all cultures have pipe traditions, and there is no single word for all ceremonial pipes across the hundreds of diverse Native American languages.

== Use in ceremonies ==
Although often called "peace pipes" by Europeans (and, specifically, calumet de la paix, by the French), the smoking of a ceremonial pipe to seal a peace treaty is only one use of a ceremonial smoking pipe, by only some of the nations that utilize them.

Various types of ceremonial pipes have been used by different Native American, First Nations and Métis cultures. The style of pipe, materials smoked, and ceremonies are unique to the specific and distinct spiritual practices of those nations. Similarly, the pipes are called by names in that tribe's language. The specific type of pipes smoked in Catholic conversion rituals first in Illinois and then in Mi'kmaq territory were known as Calumets. Historically, ceremonial pipes have been used to mark war and peace, as well as commerce and trade, and social and political decision-making.

During his travels down the Mississippi River in 1673, Father Jacques Marquette documented the universal respect that the ceremonial pipe was shown among all Native peoples he encountered, even those at war with each other. He claimed that presenting the pipe during battle would halt the fighting. The Illinois people gave Marquette such a pipe as a gift to ensure his safe travel through the interior of the land.

In ceremonial usage, the smoke is generally believed to carry prayers to the attention of the Creator or other powerful spirits. Lakota tradition tells that White Buffalo Calf Woman brought the Chanunpa (Lakota sacred pipe) to the people, and instructed them in its symbolism and ceremonies. Many Native American cultures still practice these ceremonies.

According to oral traditions, and as demonstrated by pre-contact pipes held in museums and tribal and private holdings, some ceremonial pipes are adorned with feathers, fur, animal or human hair, beadwork, quills, carvings or other items having significance for the owner. Other pipes are very simple. Many are not kept by an individual, but are instead held collectively by a medicine society or similar indigenous ceremonial organization.

== Varieties and terminology ==
Indigenous peoples of the Americas who use ceremonial pipes have names for them in each culture's indigenous language. There is no single word for all ceremonial pipes across the hundreds of diverse Native cultures.

The Lakota sacred pipe is called a chanupa, also spelled chanunpa or c'anupa. The Cherokee sacred pipe is called the gananvnawi (Cherokee syllabary: ᎦᎾᏅᎾᏫ).

In some historical sources written by colonists, a ceremonial pipe is referred to as a calumet (kal-yə-ˌmet, -mət). Calumet is a Norman word (pronounced [kalyme]), first recorded in David Ferrand's La Muse normande around 1625–1655, and used by Norman-French settlers to describe the ceremonial pipes they saw used among the native peoples of the region. The settlers initially used the word to refer to the hollow decorated pipe shaft alone while the pipe bowl was a separate ritual object, a "sort of reeds used to make pipes", with a suffix substitution for calumel. It corresponds to the French word chalumeau, meaning 'reed' (Modern French also means 'straw', 'blowlamp'). The Calumets smoked in Catholic conversion rituals first in Illinois and then in Mi'kmaq territory. They were elaborately carved and decorated. The name of the Calumet Region in Illinois and Indiana may derive from the French term or may have an independent derivation from Potawatomi. Likewise, there is a current Umatilla term, čalámat. Historian Richard White describes peace pipe rituals as an example of the "middle ground", a set of common practices crafted together by First Nations and French imperialists to bridge (or paper over) cultural distance across New France; as such the practice, though its origin may be found among Canadian First Nations, would have spread westwards alongside French expansion, and with it the French name for the pipe.

== Materials ==
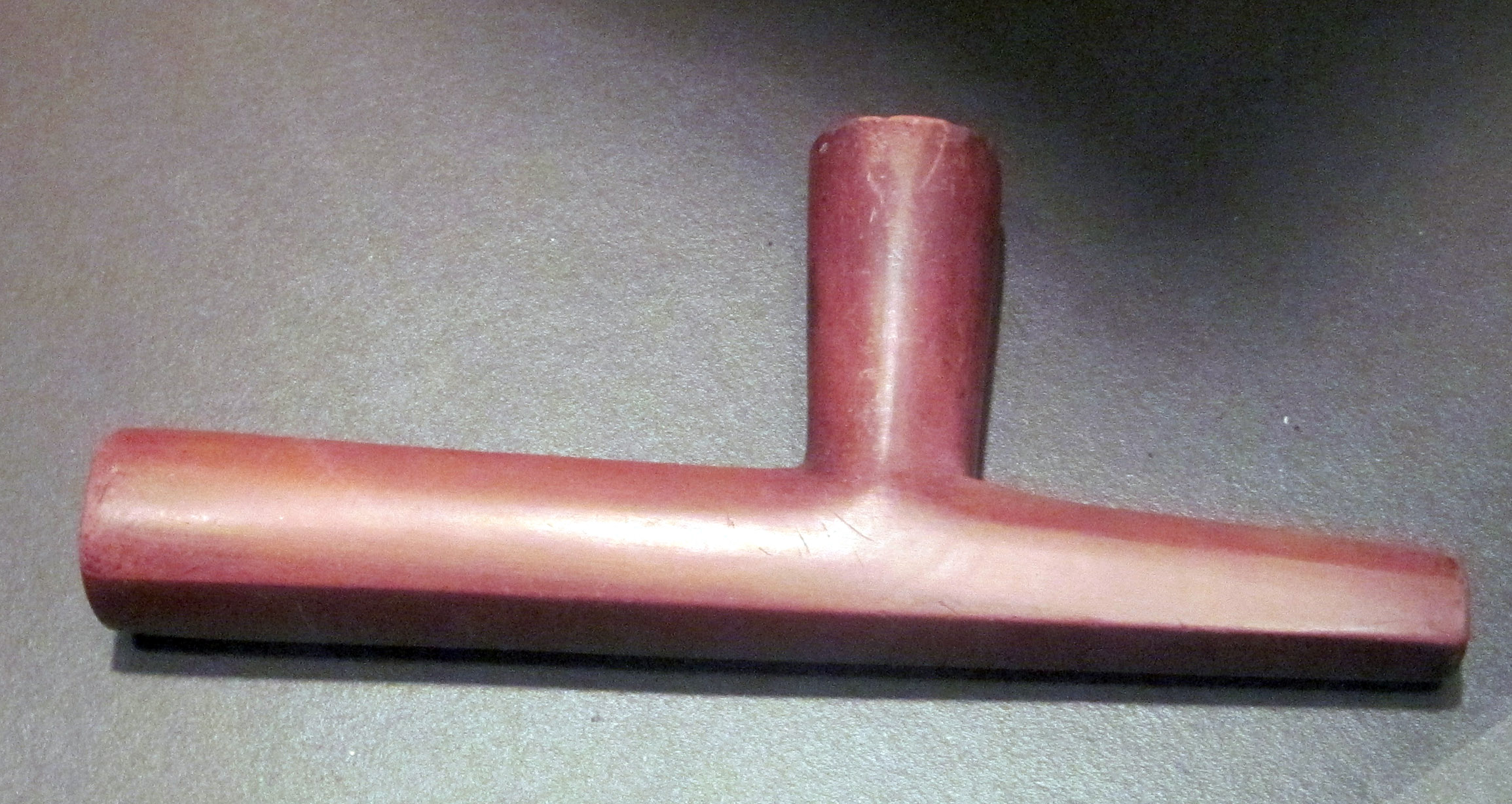
Catlinite bowl of a ceremonial pipe used by Black Hawk, on display at Black Hawk State Historic Site.

Tobacco, Nicotiana rustica, was originally used primarily by eastern tribes, but western tribes often mixed it with other herbs, barks, and plant matter, in a preparation commonly known as kinnikinnick.

One material used for ceremonial pipe bowls in the Upper Midwest is red pipestone or catlinite, a fine-grained easily worked stone of a rich red color of the Coteau des Prairies, west of the Big Stone Lake in South Dakota. The pipestone quarries of what today is Minnesota, were neutral ground as people from multiple nations journeyed to the quarry to obtain the sacred pipestone. The Sioux people use long-stemmed pipes in some of their ceremonies. Other peoples, such as the Catawba in the American Southeast, use ceremonial pipes formed as round, footed bowls. A tubular smoke tip projects from each of the four cardinal directions on the bowl.

== Pipestone varieties ==
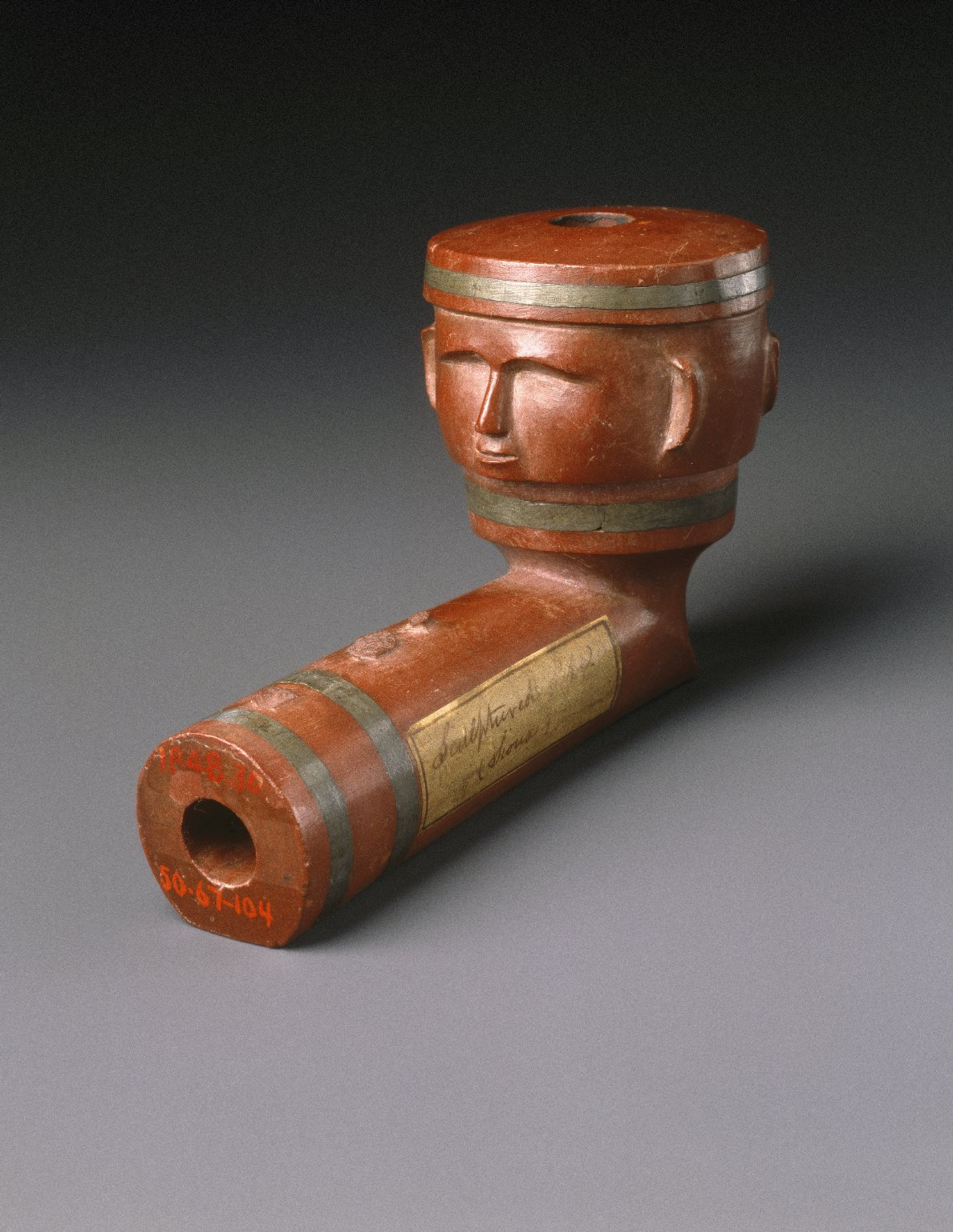
Catlinite inlayed pipe bowl with two faces, early 19th century, Sisseton Sioux

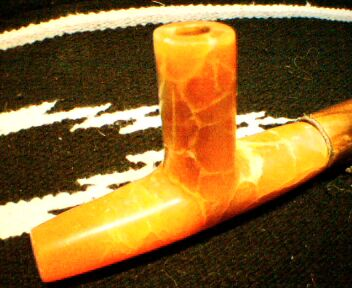
Uncompahgre Ute Salmon alabaster ceremonial pipe. Ute pipe styles are similar to those of the Plains Indians, with notable differences. Ute pipes are thicker and use shorter pipestems than the plains style and more closely resemble the pipe styles of their Northern neighbors, the Shoshone.

A number of Indigenous North American cultures make and use ceremonial pipes. However, there are also Native American cultures that do not have a ceremonial smoking tradition, but make pipes for social smoking only. The types of materials used vary by community and locality. Some of the known types of pipe stone and pipe materials are:

Clay
The Cherokee and Chickasaw both fashion pipes made from fired clay, however these are only used for social smoking. They use small reed cane pipestems made from river cane. These pipes are made from aged river clay hardened in a hot fire.
Red pipestone

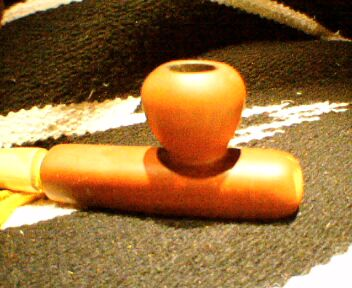
Mississippian and Eastern Woodlands style "acorn" pipe. These pipes have been found in Mississippian culture earthwork mounds in the Eastern United States. This acorn pipe is made from South Dakota red pipestone.

Catlinite is an iron-rich, reddish, soft argillite or claystone typically excavated from beds occurring between hard Sioux Quartzite layers below groundwater level, as the stone erodes rapidly when exposed to the weather and outside air. Red pipestone is used primarily by the Plains Tribes, and the Western and Great Basin Tribes. The stone can be found in Minnesota (Pipestone), and Utah (Delta, Uinta). Sacred pipestone comes from Pipestone, Minnesota. The quarry is located just north of the town at the Pipestone National Monument. Today only Native Americans are allowed to quarry the pipestone from this quarry. The pipestone from this quarry is considered the softest stone available.
Blue pipestone
is used predominantly by the Plains Tribes for certain types of ceremonial pipes. Deposits of the stone are found in South Dakota.
Bluestone
a hard, greenish-blue quartzite stone from the southern Appalachian Mountains. After being worked, it takes on a decidedly greenish cast. This stone has been used by several Eastern Woodlands tribes for pipemaking. Several ancient Mississippian culture bluestone pipes have been excavated.
Salmon alabaster
The Uncompahgre Ute People make ceremonial pipes from salmon alabaster mined in central Colorado.
Green pipestone
A white on green marbled cupric pipestone found in Wyoming and South Dakota is used by the Shoshone, Ute, and Plains Tribes for personal and ceremonial pipes. This stone is also used to carve sacred effigies and religious items.
Black pipestone (South Dakota)
a soft, brittle, white on black marbled pipestone found in South Dakota and used by some of the Plains Tribes for certain types of ceremonial pipes.
Black pipestone (Uinta)
an extremely hard black quartzite slate which has undergone metamorphic compression and is found in the southeastern drainage of the Uinta Mountains in Utah and Colorado. This stone has been used by the Great Basin Tribes for war clubs and pipes that are jet black with a high gloss when polished. Stones which have tumbled down creeks and drainages are always selected, since these stones typically contained no cracks or defects.

== Traditional pipemaking tools ==
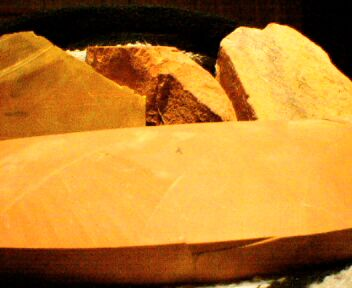
High-grade red pipestone from Delta, Utah, in both raw and cut-and-slabbed forms

One traditional method of manufacture is the use of bow drills made with hard white quartz points for drilling sacred objects from stone. One technique uses moistened rawhide strips rolled in crushed white quartz and stretched with a bow handle to shape and rough the pipes. Pipe bowls may also be shaped with hard sandstones, then polished with water and sanded with progressively finer and finer abrasive grit and animal hide, finally being rubbed with fat or other oils to complete polishing.

== See also ==
- Chanunpa
- Indigenous law
- Pipe bag
- Pipestone National Monument
