= Todd Bouman =

American football player (born 1972)

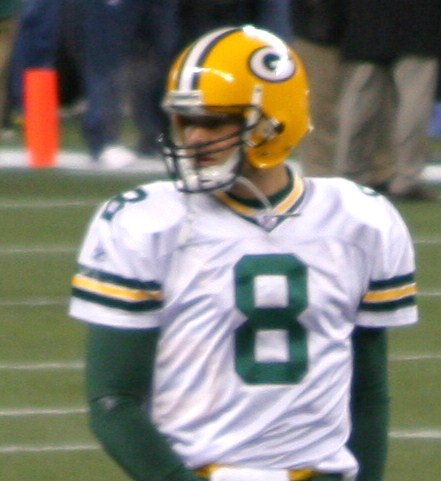
- Bouman with the Green Bay Packers in 2006

No. 8, 4
- Position: Quarterback

Personal information
- Born: August 1, 1972 (age 54); Ruthton, Minnesota, U.S.
- Listed height: 6 ft 2 in (1.88 m)
- Listed weight: 236 lb (107 kg)

Career information
- High school: Russell-Tyler-Ruthton (Tyler, Minnesota)
- College: St. Cloud State (1992–1996)
- NFL draft: 1997: undrafted

Career history
- Minnesota Vikings (1997–2002); → Barcelona Dragons (1999); New Orleans Saints (2003–2005); Green Bay Packers (2006); Jacksonville Jaguars (2007); St. Louis Rams (2007); Jacksonville Jaguars (2008)*; Baltimore Ravens (2008); Jacksonville Jaguars (2009–2010)
- * Offseason or practice squad member only

Career NFL statistics
- Passing attempts: 264
- Passing completions: 147
- Completion percentage: 55.7%
- TD–INT: 13–13
- Passing yards: 1,905
- Passer rating: 74.4
- Stats at Pro Football Reference

Todd Matthew Bouman (/ˈbaʊmən/; born August 1, 1972) is an American former professional football player who was a quarterback in the National Football League (NFL). He was signed by the Minnesota Vikings as an undrafted free agent in 1997 after playing college football for the St. Cloud State Huskies. Bouman was also a member of the New Orleans Saints, Green Bay Packers, Jacksonville Jaguars, St. Louis Rams, and Baltimore Ravens.

== Early life ==
Bouman was born in Ruthton, Minnesota, and attended Russell-Tyler-Ruthton High School (class of 1991) and was a letterman in football, basketball, and track & field. He won All-State honors in football and basketball, and in track & field, he qualified for the State Meet in both the long jump and the high jump, and led the basketball team to back-to-back State Championship appearances.

== College career ==
Bouman initially attended South Dakota State University and transferred to St. Cloud State University in 1992. At St. Cloud State, Bouman lettered in football from 1993 to 1996. In his three years, he passed for 4,354 yards and completed 326 passes (including for 30 touchdowns). In his senior year, Bouman was an honorable mention All-North Central Conference selection. He earned his degree in sports sociology from St. Cloud State in 1997.

== Professional career ==
=== Minnesota Vikings ===
Bouman signed as an undrafted free agent with the Minnesota Vikings in 1997. He was allocated to NFL Europe in 1999 to play for the Barcelona Dragons. He threw for 2,296 yards, 16 touchdowns, and 11 interceptions while also rushing 47 times for 213 yards and two touchdowns for the Dragons during the 1999 season. Bouman briefly replaced Daunte Culpepper as the Vikings starting quarterback toward the end of the 2001 NFL season after Culpepper was injured. In a game against the Tennessee Titans, Bouman completed 21 of 31 passes for 384 yards and four touchdowns and was named NFC Offensive Player of the Week. In 2002, Bouman took over again for Culpepper with the Vikings trailing the New York Giants 27–20 but could not complete a potential tying touchdown drive. After the game, Bouman expressed interest in becoming a starting quarterback.

=== New Orleans Saints ===
In 2003, the Vikings traded Bouman to the New Orleans Saints as a backup to Aaron Brooks. On December 14, 2005, after a loss on national television to the Falcons, the Saints benched Brooks and announced Bouman as the team's starter for the last three games of the season. The Saints lost all three games. Prior to the 2006 season, Bouman was released by the Saints in favor of Jamie Martin, who would back up newly signed starter Drew Brees.

=== Green Bay Packers ===
On November 21, 2006, Bouman signed with the Green Bay Packers to replace injured Aaron Rodgers as their second-string quarterback. He became a free agent after the 2006 season.

=== Jacksonville Jaguars (first stint) ===
On October 25, 2007, Bouman was signed to a one-year deal by the Jacksonville Jaguars as a backup to Quinn Gray, who was starting in place of an injured David Garrard. He was released on November 20, 2007.

=== St. Louis Rams ===
Bouman then signed with the St. Louis Rams on December 7, 2007, as insurance when starting quarterback Marc Bulger was out and backup Gus Frerotte went down. Bouman was released on December 14, 2007.

=== Jacksonville Jaguars (second stint) ===
Bouman re-signed with the Jaguars in the 2008 offseason and attended training camp with the team. He was later released on August 30 during final cuts.

=== Baltimore Ravens ===
Bouman signed with the Baltimore Ravens on September 3, 2008, after quarterback Kyle Boller was placed on injured reserve. He was released by the team on November 1, only to be re-signed four days later.

Bouman was re-signed by the Ravens on March 31, 2009. The Ravens released him again on May 1 after signing quarterback John Beck.

=== Jacksonville Jaguars (third stint) ===
The Jaguars re-signed Bouman on May 4, 2009, following the release of undrafted rookie quarterback Nathan Brown. Bouman was released on September 7, 2009.

He was re-signed for a fourth time on September 21, 2010, when the Jaguars placed Luke McCown on the injured reserve. On October 5, 2010, the Jaguars released Bouman. On October 19, Bouman was re-signed after injuries to David Garrard and Trent Edwards. Bouman started for the Jags against the Kansas City Chiefs on October 24. Bouman played well, throwing for 222 yards, and 2 touchdowns, however he also threw 2 interceptions. He was released again on November 9, 2010. He was re-signed again by the Jaguars on December 17, and became a free agent after the season. Bouman was re-signed once more on August 9, 2011, due to a back injury to starter Garrard. He was released on August 29.

== Coaching career ==
On March 19, 2014, the Buffalo-Hanover-Montrose School District in Minnesota announced Todd Bouman as the new head coach for the Buffalo High School program.

== Personal life ==
Bouman and his wife, Courtney, have a daughter, Aivary, and a son, Aidan, who transferred to South Dakota after starting his college career with the Iowa State Cyclones.
