= Elmer Township =

Elmer Township may refer to the following places in the United States:

- Elmer Township, Oscoda County, Michigan
- Elmer Township, Sanilac County, Michigan
- Elmer Township, Pipestone County, Minnesota
- Elmer Township, St. Louis County, Minnesota
