= LaGrange Township =

LaGrange Township or La Grange Township may refer to:

- La Grange Township, Lafayette County, Arkansas, in Lafayette County, Arkansas
- Lagrange Township, Illinois
- LaGrange Township, Harrison County, Iowa, in Harrison County, Iowa
- LaGrange Township, Michigan
- LaGrange Township, Lorain County, Ohio

== See also ==
- Grange Township (disambiguation)
