= Pipe bag =

Native American ceremonial item

A pipe bag or tobacco bag is a common item used by some Native American ceremonial people. A pipe bag may be used to carry a sacred pipe, such as a Chanunpa.

== Styles ==
Although styles and sizes vary between Nations, geographical locations, and medicine societies, many have certain elements in common: a long neck of cloth or leather, a rim which is often beaded or quilled, a lower panel, or pouch, also beaded or quilled, and a fringe at the bottom. Some bags are left unadorned.

Many of the more recent bags have a quilled "slat panel" between the pouch and the fringe, while many of the older ones do not.

== Examples and symbolism ==
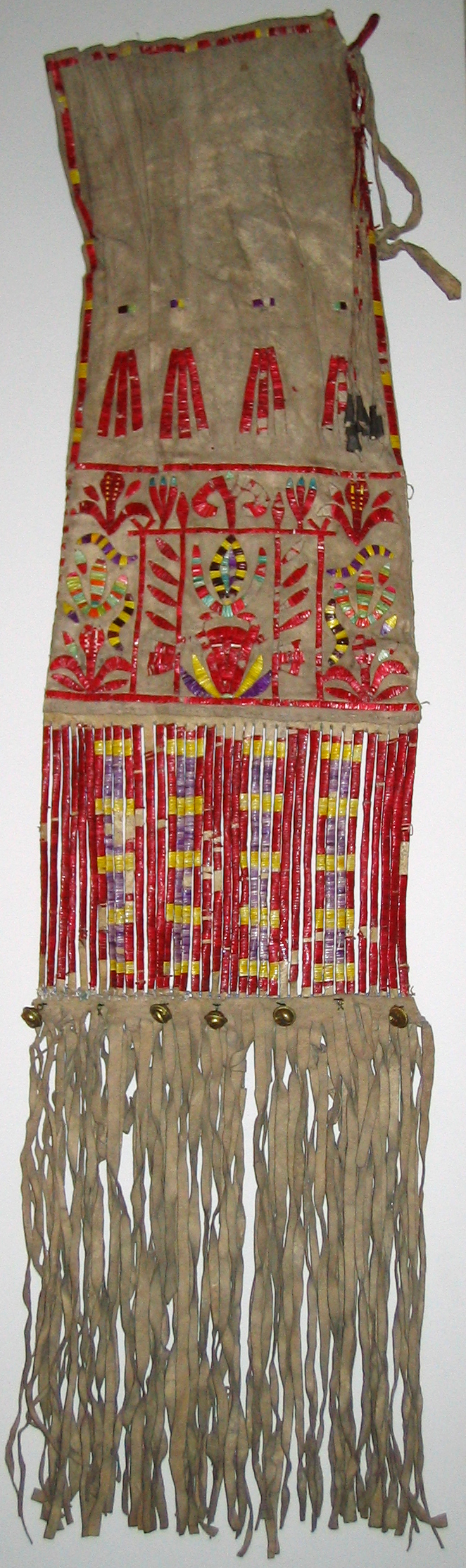
Sioux Quilled Pipe Bag c. 1870, decorated with rare cocoon imagery.

Northern Plains Beaded Pipe Bag c. 1870s

The Sioux Quilled Pipe Bag at left is decorated with quillwork forming flora and fauna, buffalo and caterpillars. The "cocoon" design symbolizes spiritual and physical transformation, and the Sioux spirit Yumni, the whirlwind, responsible for the four directions of the world.

Both the moth, which breaks free of its confining cocoon, and the untamable wind, are viewed as spirits impossible to contain.

Clark Wissler described in his 1907 field notes the "whirlwind bug", a creature with spiral grooves that creates small dust clouds along the ground. By this action, the cloud was thought to confuse the enemy and make him lose his senses. The cocoon above what appears to be the head of the bear may represent the whirlwind phenomena.

== See also ==
- Ceremonial pipe
- Chanunpa
- Quillwork
