= Burke Township, Pipestone County, Minnesota =

Burke Township, Minnesota
- Township
- Location within the state of Minnesota Burke Township, Minnesota (the United States)
- Coordinates: 43°59′5″N 96°8′3″W
- Country: United States
- State: Minnesota
- County: Pipestone

Area
  - Total: 34.6 sq mi (89.5 km^{2})
  - Land: 34.6 sq mi (89.5 km^{2})
  - Water: 0 sq mi (0.0 km^{2})
- Elevation: 1,693 ft (516 m)

Population (2000)
  - Total: 246
  - Density: 7.0/sq mi (2.7/km^{2})
- Time zone: UTC-6 (Central (CST))
  - Summer (DST): UTC-5 (CDT)
- FIPS code: 27-08650
- GNIS feature ID: 0663704

Burke Township is a township in Pipestone County, Minnesota, United States. The population was 246 at the 2000 census.

== History ==
Burke Township was organized in 1879, and named for Thomas Nicholas Burke (1830–1882), an Irish Roman Catholic theologian and preacher.

== Geography ==
According to the United States Census Bureau, the township has a total area of 34.6 square miles (90 km^{2}), all land.

== Demographics ==
As of the census of 2000, there were 246 people, 85 households, and 74 families residing in the township. The population density was 7.1 inhabitants per square mile (2.7/km^{2}). There were 88 housing units at an average density of 2.5 per square mile (0.97/km^{2}). The racial makeup of the township was 97.56% White, 1.63% Asian, and 0.81% from two or more races.

There were 85 households, out of which 41.2% had children under the age of 18 living with them, 83.5% were married couples living together, 2.4% had a female householder with no husband present, and 11.8% were non-families. 11.8% of all households were made up of individuals, and 4.7% had someone living alone who was 65 years of age or older. The average household size was 2.89 and the average family size was 3.12.

In the township the population was spread out, with 28.5% under the age of 18, 8.1% from 18 to 24, 23.2% from 25 to 44, 29.3% from 45 to 64, and 11.0% who were 65 years of age or older. The median age was 38 years. For every 100 females, there were 98.4 males. For every 100 females age 18 and over, there were 100.0 males.

The median income for a household in the township was $35,903, and the median income for a family was $36,167. Males had a median income of $26,563 versus $17,500 for females. The per capita income for the township was $12,992. About 18.4% of families and 14.0% of the population were below the poverty line, including 11.1% of those under the age of eighteen and none of those 65 or over.

== Politics ==
Burke Township is located in Minnesota's 1st congressional district, represented by Mankato educator Tim Walz, a Democrat. At the state level, Burke Township is located in Senate District 22, represented by Republican Doug Magnus, and in House District 22A, represented by Republican Joe Schomacker.

In the 2020 Democratic Party presidential primaries, it was the only township in the state to vote for candidate Tulsi Gabbard.
