= Pipestone County, Minnesota =

County in Minnesota, United States

- County
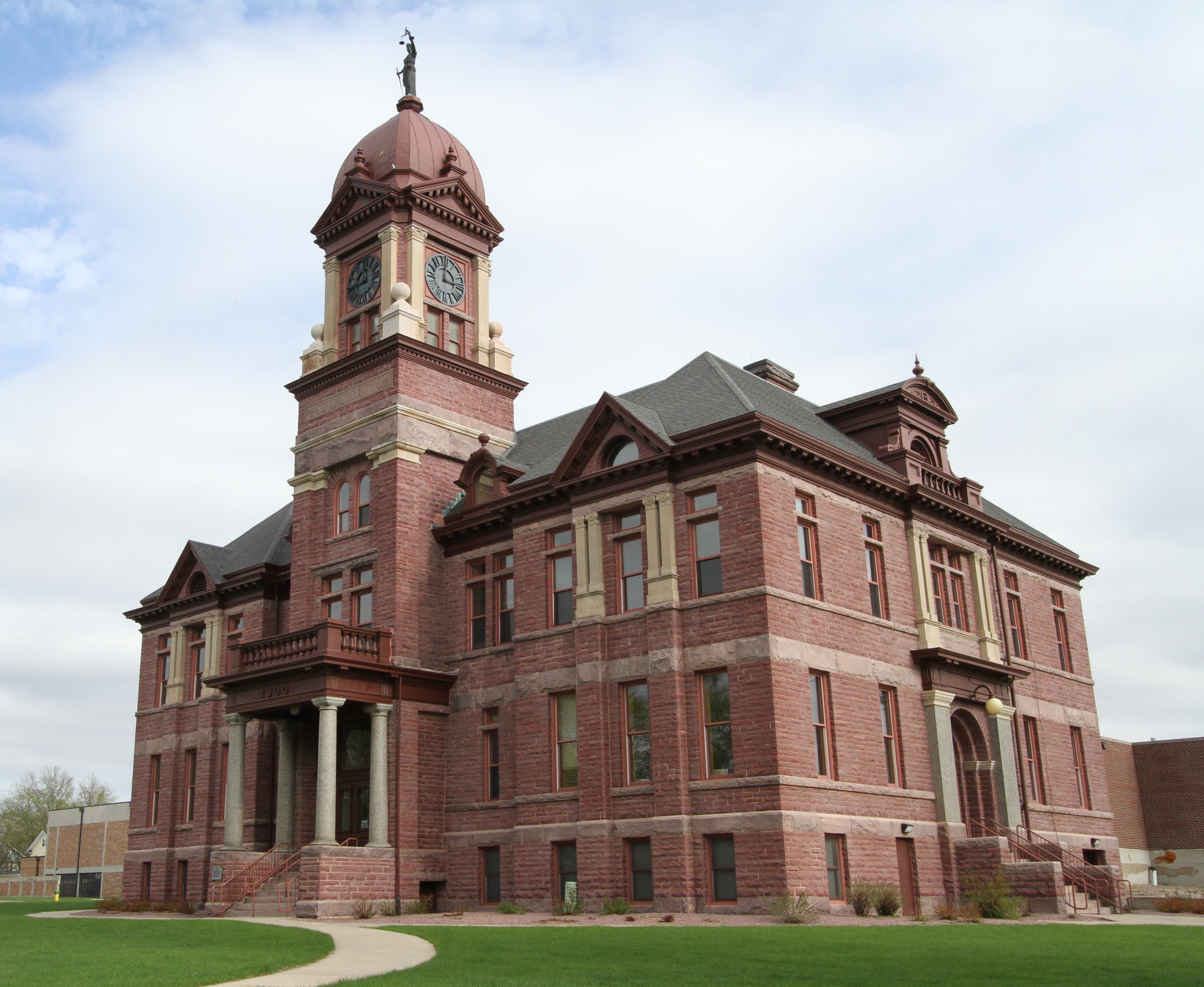
- Pipestone County Courthouse

- Location within the U.S. state of Minnesota
- Coordinates: 44°01′N 96°15′W
- Country: United States
- State: Minnesota
- Founded: May 23, 1857 (created); 1879 (organized)
- Named for: Pipestone
- Seat: Pipestone
- Largest city: Pipestone

Area
  - Total: 466 sq mi (1,210 km^{2})
  - Land: 465 sq mi (1,200 km^{2})
  - Water: 0.9 sq mi (2.3 km^{2}) 0.2%

Population (2020)
  - Total: 9,424
  - Estimate (2025): 9,260 ▼
  - Density: 19.9/sq mi (7.7/km^{2})
- Time zone: UTC−6 (Central)
  - Summer (DST): UTC−5 (CDT)
- Congressional district: 7th
- Website: www.pipestone-county.com

Pipestone County is a county in the U.S. state of Minnesota. As of the 2020 census, the population was 9,424. Its county seat is Pipestone.

== History ==
The county was formed on May 23, 1857, by act of the territorial legislature, but was not organized at that time. The area was first designated Rock County while the name Pipestone County was attached to neighboring Rock County. An act of the Minnesota state legislature on February 20, 1862, swapped the designations, attaching the present names to the present counties, due to the pipestone quarry in this county.

Pipestone County organization was effected by a state act on January 27, 1879, with Pipestone City (which had been platted in 1876) as the county seat (the name of the county seat was later shortened to Pipestone). The pipestones are from deposits of red pipestone Native Americans used to make pipes.

Pipestone National Monument is in the county, just north of the town of Pipestone.

In March 1915, a law was signed to give Minnesota counties the right to choose whether to allow alcohol production. Pipestone voted on the law, which yielded a margin of 4 votes in favor of keeping the county wet. Dry county proponents appealed to the Minnesota District Court and the Supreme Court, but the courts ruled in favor of a wet county.

== Geography ==
Pipestone County lies on Minnesota's border with South Dakota. The Rock River rises in the county and flows southward into Rock County, being augmented by the East Branch of the Rock River near the southern border. The terrain consists of low rolling hills, carved by drainages. The area is devoted to agriculture. The terrain slopes to the west and south, with its highest point on the upper part of its eastern border, at 1,883 ft (574 m) ASL. The county has an area of 466 square miles (1,210 km^{2}), of which 465 square miles (1,200 km^{2}) is land and 0.9 square miles (2.3 km^{2}) (0.2%) is water.

Soils of Pipestone County

The highest point in the eastern part of the county may be as stated but the highest summit is 1995 ft at 44.1927°, -96.2033°

=== Major highways ===
- U.S. Highway 75
- Minnesota State Highway 23
- Minnesota State Highway 30
- Minnesota State Highway 269

=== Adjacent counties ===
- Lincoln County - north
- Lyon County - northeast
- Murray County - east
- Rock County - south
- Minnehaha County, South Dakota - southwest
- Moody County, South Dakota - west
- Brookings County, South Dakota - northwest

=== Protected areas ===
- Altona State Wildlife Management Area
- Burke State Wildlife Management Area
- Holland State Wildlife Management Area
- Pheasant Terrace State Wildlife Management Area
- Pipestone Indian State Wildlife Management Area (within Pipestone Natl Monument)
- Pipestone National Monument
- Prairie Coteau Scientific and Natural Area
- Split Rock Creek State Park
- Troy State Wildlife Management Area
- Van Beek State Wildlife Management Area
- Woodstock State Wildlife Management Area

=== Lakes ===
Pipestone County is one of only four Minnesota counties without a natural lake, the other three being Mower, Olmsted and Rock. It does contain manmade reservoirs:

- Indian Lake
- Split Rock Lake: in Split Rock Creek State Park

== Demographics ==
Historical population
| Census | Pop. | Note | %± |
|---|---|---|---|
| 1880 | 2,092 | | — |
| 1890 | 5,132 | | 145.3% |
| 1900 | 9,264 | | 80.5% |
| 1910 | 9,553 | | 3.1% |
| 1920 | 12,050 | | 26.1% |
| 1930 | 12,238 | | 1.6% |
| 1940 | 13,794 | | 12.7% |
| 1950 | 14,003 | | 1.5% |
| 1960 | 13,605 | | −2.8% |
| 1970 | 12,791 | | −6.0% |
| 1980 | 11,690 | | −8.6% |
| 1990 | 10,491 | | −10.3% |
| 2000 | 9,895 | | −5.7% |
| 2010 | 9,596 | | −3.0% |
| 2020 | 9,424 | | −1.8% |
| 2025 (est.) | 9,260 | ▼ | −1.7% |
U.S. Decennial Census:

=== Racial and ethnic composition ===
Pipestone County, Minnesota – Racial and ethnic composition Note: the US Census treats Hispanic/Latino as an ethnic category. This table excludes Latinos from the racial categories and assigns them to a separate category. Hispanics/Latinos may be of any race.
| Race / Ethnicity (NH = Non-Hispanic) | Pop 1980 | Pop 1990 | Pop 2000 | Pop 2010 | Pop 2020 | % 1980 | % 1990 | % 2000 | % 2010 | % 2020 |
|---|---|---|---|---|---|---|---|---|---|---|
| White alone (NH) | 11,529 | 10,221 | 9,538 | 8,880 | 8,057 | 98.62% | 97.43% | 96.39% | 92.54% | 85.49% |
| Black or African American alone (NH) | 5 | 6 | 17 | 52 | 107 | 0.04% | 0.06% | 0.17% | 0.54% | 1.14% |
| Native American or Alaska Native alone (NH) | 80 | 153 | 138 | 96 | 100 | 0.68% | 1.46% | 1.39% | 1.00% | 1.06% |
| Asian alone (NH) | 23 | 68 | 45 | 69 | 66 | 0.20% | 0.65% | 0.45% | 0.72% | 0.70% |
| Native Hawaiian or Pacific Islander alone (NH) | x | x | 1 | 0 | 0 | x | x | 0.01% | 0.00% | 0.00% |
| Other race alone (NH) | 16 | 1 | 5 | 5 | 19 | 0.14% | 0.01% | 0.05% | 0.05% | 0.20% |
| Mixed race or Multiracial (NH) | x | x | 82 | 139 | 271 | x | x | 0.83% | 1.45% | 2.88% |
| Hispanic or Latino (any race) | 37 | 42 | 69 | 355 | 804 | 0.32% | 0.40% | 0.70% | 3.70% | 8.53% |
| Total | 11,690 | 10,491 | 9,895 | 9,596 | 9,424 | 100.00% | 100.00% | 100.00% | 100.00% | 100.00% |

=== 2020 census ===
As of the 2020 census, the county had a population of 9,424. The median age was 41.8 years. 24.9% of residents were under the age of 18 and 21.7% of residents were 65 years of age or older. For every 100 females there were 98.7 males, and for every 100 females age 18 and over there were 95.9 males age 18 and over.

The racial makeup of the county was 86.6% White, 1.1% Black or African American, 1.3% American Indian and Alaska Native, 0.7% Asian, <0.1% Native Hawaiian and Pacific Islander, 5.7% from some other race, and 4.6% from two or more races. Hispanic or Latino residents of any race comprised 8.5% of the population.

<0.1% of residents lived in urban areas, while 100.0% lived in rural areas.

There were 3,948 households in the county, of which 28.4% had children under the age of 18 living in them. Of all households, 50.4% were married-couple households, 19.6% were households with a male householder and no spouse or partner present, and 23.6% were households with a female householder and no spouse or partner present. About 31.6% of all households were made up of individuals and 14.9% had someone living alone who was 65 years of age or older.

There were 4,337 housing units, of which 9.0% were vacant. Among occupied housing units, 76.1% were owner-occupied and 23.9% were renter-occupied. The homeowner vacancy rate was 1.4% and the rental vacancy rate was 13.8%.

=== 2000 census ===
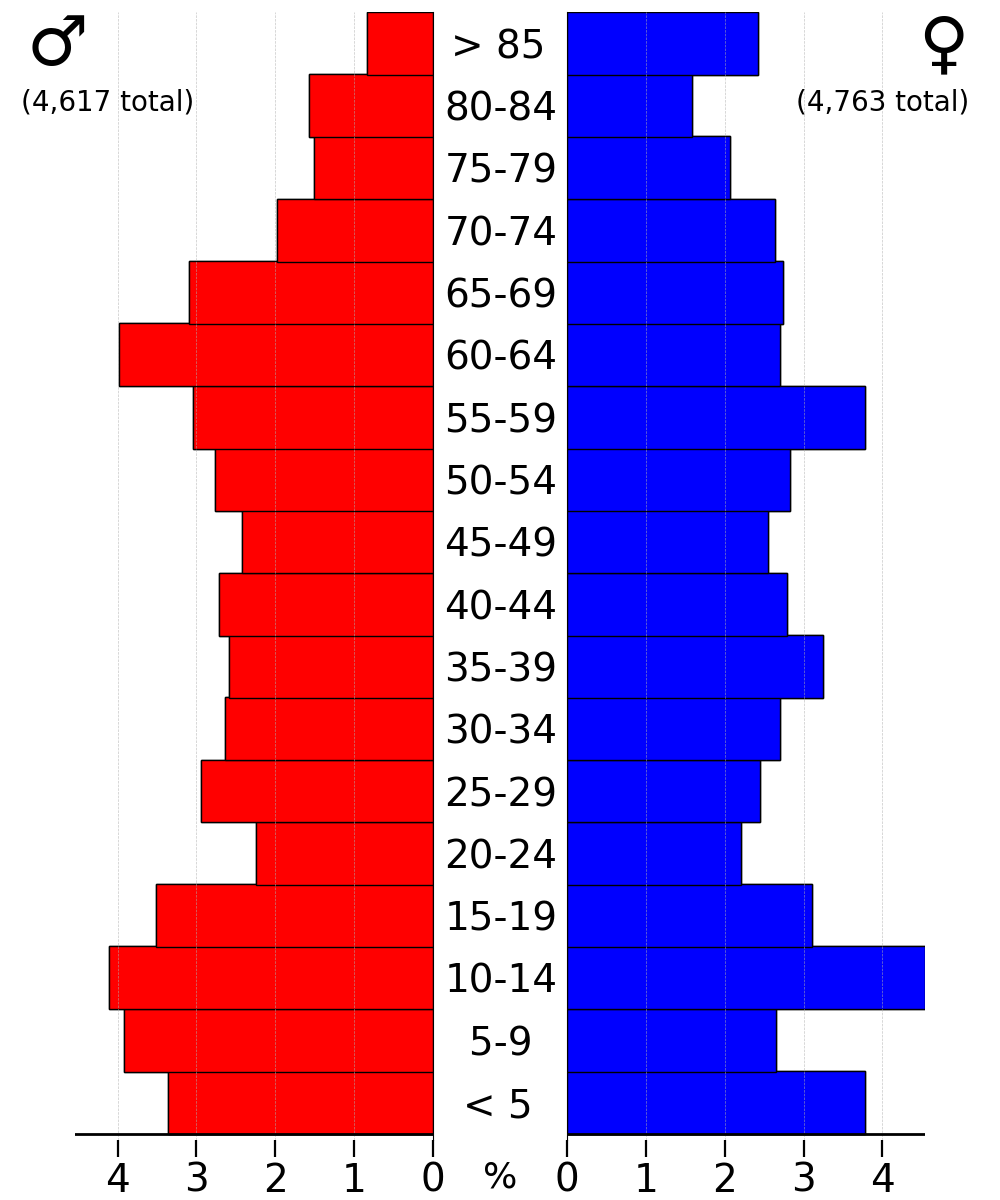
2022 US Census population pyramid for Pipestone County, from ACS 5-year estimates

As of the census of 2000, there were 9,895 people, 4,069 households, and 2,726 families in the county. The population density was 21.3 per square mile (8.2/km^{2}). There were 4,434 housing units at an average density of 9.54 per square mile (3.68/km^{2}). The racial makeup of the county was 96.68% White, 0.17% Black or African American, 1.48% Native American, 0.46% Asian, 0.02% Pacific Islander, 0.26% from other races, and 0.93% from two or more races. 0.70% of the population were Hispanic or Latino of any race. 35.7% were of German, 24.8% Dutch and 14.3% Norwegian ancestry.

There were 4,069 households, of which 31.0% had children under age 18 living with them, 57.6% were married couples living together, 6.5% had a female householder with no husband present, and 33.0% were non-families. 30.1% of all households were made up of individuals, and 17.2% had someone living alone who was 65 or older. The average household size was 2.38 and the average family size was 2.96.

The county population contained 25.8% under age 18, 6.8% from 18 to 24, 24.6% from 25 to 44, 21.4% from 45 to 64, and 21.3% who were 65 or older. The median age was 40. For every 100 females there were 92.8 males. For every 100 females 18 and over, there were 89.4 males.

The median income for a household in the county was $31,909, and the median income for a family was $40,133. Males had a median income of $27,642 versus $20,759 for females. The per capita income for the county was $16,450. About 7.8% of families and 9.5% of the population were below the poverty line, including 11.2% of those under 18 and 11.1% of those 65 or older.

== Communities ==
Pipestone County Administrative map

=== Cities ===
- Edgerton
- Hatfield
- Holland
- Ihlen
- Jasper (partly in Rock County)
- Pipestone (county seat)
- Ruthton
- Trosky
- Woodstock

=== Unincorporated communities ===
- Airlie
- Cazenovia
- Cresson
- Diamond Corner

=== Townships ===
- Aetna Township
- Altona Township
- Burke Township
- Eden Township
- Elmer Township
- Fountain Prairie Township
- Grange Township
- Gray Township
- Osborne Township
- Rock Township
- Sweet Township
- Troy Township

== Government and politics ==
In recent decades Pipestone County has trended Republican. In no presidential election since 1976 has the county selected the Democratic nominee (as of 2024). In 2012, it was one of only two counties not to vote for Democratic U.S. Senate candidate Amy Klobuchar, along with its southern neighbor Rock County.

United States presidential election results for Pipestone County, Minnesota
| Year | Republican | | Democratic | | Third party(ies) | |
| Year | No. | % | No. | % | No. | % |
|---|---|---|---|---|---|---|
| 1892 | 648 | 47.96% | 295 | 21.84% | 408 | 30.20% |
| 1896 | 862 | 47.49% | 919 | 50.63% | 34 | 1.87% |
| 1900 | 1,112 | 59.85% | 692 | 37.24% | 54 | 2.91% |
| 1904 | 1,185 | 76.16% | 269 | 17.29% | 102 | 6.56% |
| 1908 | 1,057 | 65.09% | 491 | 30.23% | 76 | 4.68% |
| 1912 | 301 | 18.09% | 505 | 30.35% | 858 | 51.56% |
| 1916 | 1,010 | 52.44% | 732 | 38.01% | 184 | 9.55% |
| 1920 | 3,106 | 79.89% | 490 | 12.60% | 292 | 7.51% |
| 1924 | 2,066 | 48.16% | 219 | 5.10% | 2,005 | 46.74% |
| 1928 | 2,578 | 61.28% | 1,591 | 37.82% | 38 | 0.90% |
| 1932 | 1,509 | 32.96% | 2,996 | 65.44% | 73 | 1.59% |
| 1936 | 1,881 | 36.38% | 3,026 | 58.53% | 263 | 5.09% |
| 1940 | 3,423 | 58.59% | 2,390 | 40.91% | 29 | 0.50% |
| 1944 | 2,844 | 56.95% | 2,129 | 42.63% | 21 | 0.42% |
| 1948 | 2,281 | 44.03% | 2,804 | 54.13% | 95 | 1.83% |
| 1952 | 4,507 | 72.45% | 1,701 | 27.34% | 13 | 0.21% |
| 1956 | 3,362 | 60.76% | 2,165 | 39.13% | 6 | 0.11% |
| 1960 | 3,677 | 59.97% | 2,443 | 39.85% | 11 | 0.18% |
| 1964 | 2,481 | 42.40% | 3,365 | 57.51% | 5 | 0.09% |
| 1968 | 3,241 | 56.48% | 2,234 | 38.93% | 263 | 4.58% |
| 1972 | 3,543 | 55.57% | 2,758 | 43.26% | 75 | 1.18% |
| 1976 | 3,018 | 47.15% | 3,272 | 51.12% | 111 | 1.73% |
| 1980 | 3,207 | 51.37% | 2,392 | 38.31% | 644 | 10.32% |
| 1984 | 3,043 | 55.32% | 2,391 | 43.46% | 67 | 1.22% |
| 1988 | 2,760 | 53.19% | 2,382 | 45.90% | 47 | 0.91% |
| 1992 | 1,953 | 37.78% | 1,773 | 34.29% | 1,444 | 27.93% |
| 1996 | 2,096 | 44.39% | 1,999 | 42.33% | 627 | 13.28% |
| 2000 | 2,693 | 55.03% | 1,970 | 40.25% | 231 | 4.72% |
| 2004 | 3,066 | 60.93% | 1,900 | 37.76% | 66 | 1.31% |
| 2008 | 2,652 | 55.24% | 2,023 | 42.14% | 126 | 2.62% |
| 2012 | 2,826 | 60.83% | 1,725 | 37.13% | 95 | 2.04% |
| 2016 | 3,338 | 69.43% | 1,127 | 23.44% | 343 | 7.13% |
| 2020 | 3,553 | 71.92% | 1,306 | 26.44% | 81 | 1.64% |
| 2024 | 3,537 | 73.12% | 1,215 | 25.12% | 85 | 1.76% |

County Board of Commissioners
| Position | Name | District | Next Election |
|---|---|---|---|
| Commissioner | Luke Johnson | District 1 | 2024 |
| Commissioner | Doug Nagel | District 2 | 2026 |
| Commissioner | Dallas Roskamp | District 3 | 2024 |
| Commissioner | Dan Wildermuth | District 4 | 2026 |
| Commissioner | Chris Hollinsworth | District 5 | 2024 |

State Legislature (2018-2020)
| Position | Name | Affiliation | District |
|---|---|---|---|
| Senate | Bill Weber | Republican | District 22 |
| House of Representatives | Joe Schomacker | Republican | District 22A |

U.S Congress (2018-2020)
| Position | Name | Affiliation | District |
|---|---|---|---|
| House of Representatives | Michelle Fischbach | Republican | 7th |
| Senate | Amy Klobuchar | Democrat | N/A |
| Senate | Tina Smith | Democrat | N/A |

== See also ==
- National Register of Historic Places listings in Pipestone County, Minnesota
