= Troy Township, Pipestone County, Minnesota =

Troy Township, Minnesota
- Township
- Location within the state of Minnesota
- Coordinates: 44°3′35″N 96°22′43″W
- Country: United States
- State: Minnesota
- County: Pipestone

Area
  - Total: 43.6 sq mi (113.0 km^{2})
  - Land: 43.6 sq mi (113.0 km^{2})
  - Water: 0 sq mi (0.0 km^{2})
- Elevation: 1,696 ft (517 m)

Population (2000)
  - Total: 318
  - Density: 7.3/sq mi (2.8/km^{2})
- Time zone: UTC-6 (Central (CST))
  - Summer (DST): UTC-5 (CDT)
- Postal code: 56164
- Area code: 507
- FIPS code: 27-65614
- GNIS feature ID: 0665812

Troy Township is a township in Pipestone County, Minnesota, United States. The population was 318 at the 2000 census.

Troy Township was organized in 1879, and named after Troy, New York.

== Geography ==
According to the United States Census Bureau, the township has a total area of 43.6 square miles (113.0 km^{2}), all land.

== Demographics ==
As of the census of 2000, there were 318 people, 110 households, and 94 families residing in the township. The population density was 7.3 people per square mile (2.8/km^{2}). There were 114 housing units at an average density of 2.6/sq mi (1.0/km^{2}). The racial makeup of the township was 100.00% White.

There were 110 households, out of which 41.8% had children under the age of 18 living with them, 77.3% were married couples living together, 6.4% had a female householder with no husband present, and 14.5% were non-families. 11.8% of all households were made up of individuals, and 4.5% had someone living alone who was 65 years of age or older. The average household size was 2.89 and the average family size was 3.16.

In the township the population was spread out, with 31.8% under the age of 18, 6.9% from 18 to 24, 25.2% from 25 to 44, 23.9% from 45 to 64, and 12.3% who were 65 years of age or older. The median age was 38 years. For every 100 females, there were 107.8 males. For every 100 females age 18 and over, there were 110.7 males.

The median income for a household in the township was $35,357, and the median income for a family was $36,429. Males had a median income of $21,667 versus $19,375 for females. The per capita income for the township was $16,518. About 10.9% of families and 13.4% of the population were below the poverty line, including 21.4% of those under age 18 and 12.9% of those age 65 or over.

== Politics ==
Troy Township is located in Minnesota's 1st congressional district, represented by Jim Hagedorn a Republican. At the state level, Troy Township is located in Senate District 22, represented by Republican Bill Weber, and in House District 22A, represented by Republican Joe Schomacker.
