= Chanunpa =

Lakota sacred ceremonial pipe

Chanunpa (čhaŋnúŋpa, Chanupa, or Canupa) is the Lakota language name for the sacred, ceremonial pipe and the ceremony in which it is used. The pipe ceremony is one of the Seven Sacred Rites of the Lakota people. Lakota tradition has it that White Buffalo Calf Woman brought the chanunpa to the people, as one of the Seven Sacred Rites, to serve as a sacred bridge between this world and Wakan Tanka, the "Great Mystery".

The chanunpa is one means of conveying prayers to the Creator and the other sacred beings. The various parts of the pipe have symbolic meanings, and much of this symbolism is not shared with those outside the culture. While sacred pipes of various designs are used in ceremonies by a number of different Indigenous peoples of the Americas, chanunpa is specifically the Lakota name for their type of ceremonial pipe and ceremony. Other nations have their own names for their pipes and ceremonies, in their particular Indigenous languages.

== See also ==
- Ceremonial pipe
- Smoking pipe
- Pipe bag
