= Grange Township, Pipestone County, Minnesota =

Grange Township, Minnesota
- Township
- Location within the state of Minnesota Grange Township, Minnesota (the United States)
- Coordinates: 44°3′42″N 96°14′8″W
- Country: United States
- State: Minnesota
- County: Pipestone

Area
  - Total: 36.1 sq mi (93.6 km^{2})
  - Land: 36.1 sq mi (93.6 km^{2})
  - Water: 0 sq mi (0.0 km^{2})
- Elevation: 1,770 ft (540 m)

Population (2000)
  - Total: 244
  - Density: 6.7/sq mi (2.6/km^{2})
- Time zone: UTC-6 (Central (CST))
  - Summer (DST): UTC-5 (CDT)
- FIPS code: 27-25208
- GNIS feature ID: 0664321

Grange Township is a township in Pipestone County, Minnesota, United States. The population was 244 at the 2000 census.

== History ==
Grange Township was organized in 1879, and named for The National Grange of the Order of Patrons of Husbandry (The Grange), an agricultural organization.

== Geography ==
According to the United States Census Bureau, the township has a total area of 36.1 square miles (93 km^{2}), all land.

== Demographics ==
As of the census of 2000, there were 244 people, 86 households, and 68 families residing in the township. The population density was 6.8 inhabitants per square mile (2.6/km^{2}). There were 92 housing units at an average density of 2.5 per square mile (0.97/km^{2}). The racial makeup of the township was 97.54% White, 2.05% Native American, 0.41% from other races. Hispanic or Latino of any race were 0.41% of the population.

There were 86 households, out of which 37.2% had children under the age of 18 living with them, 73.3% were married couples living together, and 20.9% were non-families. 18.6% of all households were made up of individuals, and 11.6% had someone living alone who was 65 years of age or older. The average household size was 2.84 and the average family size was 3.26.

In the township the population was spread out, with 29.5% under the age of 18, 6.1% from 18 to 24, 27.9% from 25 to 44, 24.2% from 45 to 64, and 12.3% who were 65 years of age or older. The median age was 37 years. For every 100 females, there were 100.0 males. For every 100 females age 18 and over, there were 112.3 males.

The median income for a household in the township was $40,000, and the median income for a family was $44,375. Males had a median income of $24,219 versus $23,333 for females. The per capita income for the township was $15,455. About 7.2% of families and 8.4% of the population were below the poverty line, including 8.5% of those under the age of eighteen and 18.4% of those 65 or over.

== Politics ==
Grange Township is located in Minnesota's 1st congressional district, represented by Mankato educator Tim Walz, a Democrat. At the state level, Grange Township is located in Senate District 22, represented by Republican Doug Magnus, and in House District 22A, represented by Republican Joe Schomacker.
