= Catlinite =

Type of metamorphosed mudstone

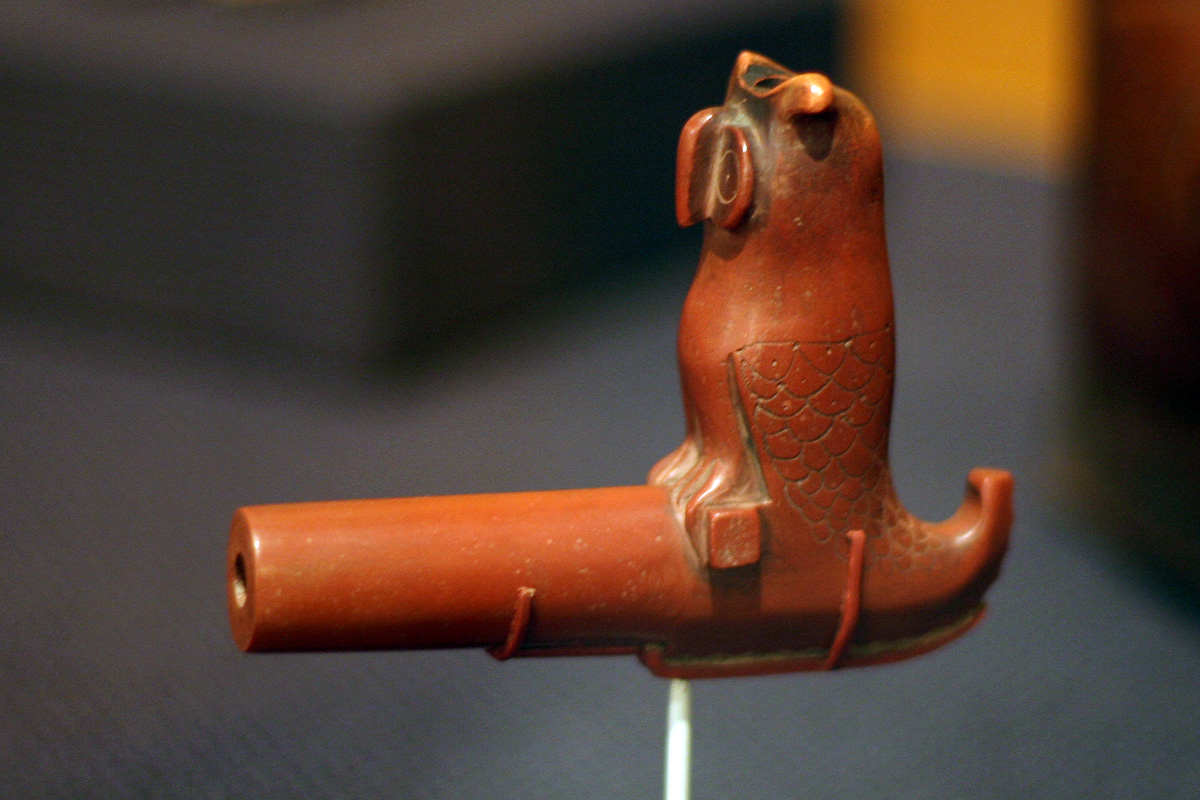
Native American, Plains (unidentified). Pipe bowl representing owl, early 20th century. Catlinite or pipestone, 3 3/4 × 5 3/8 in. (9.5 × 13.7 cm). Brooklyn Museum

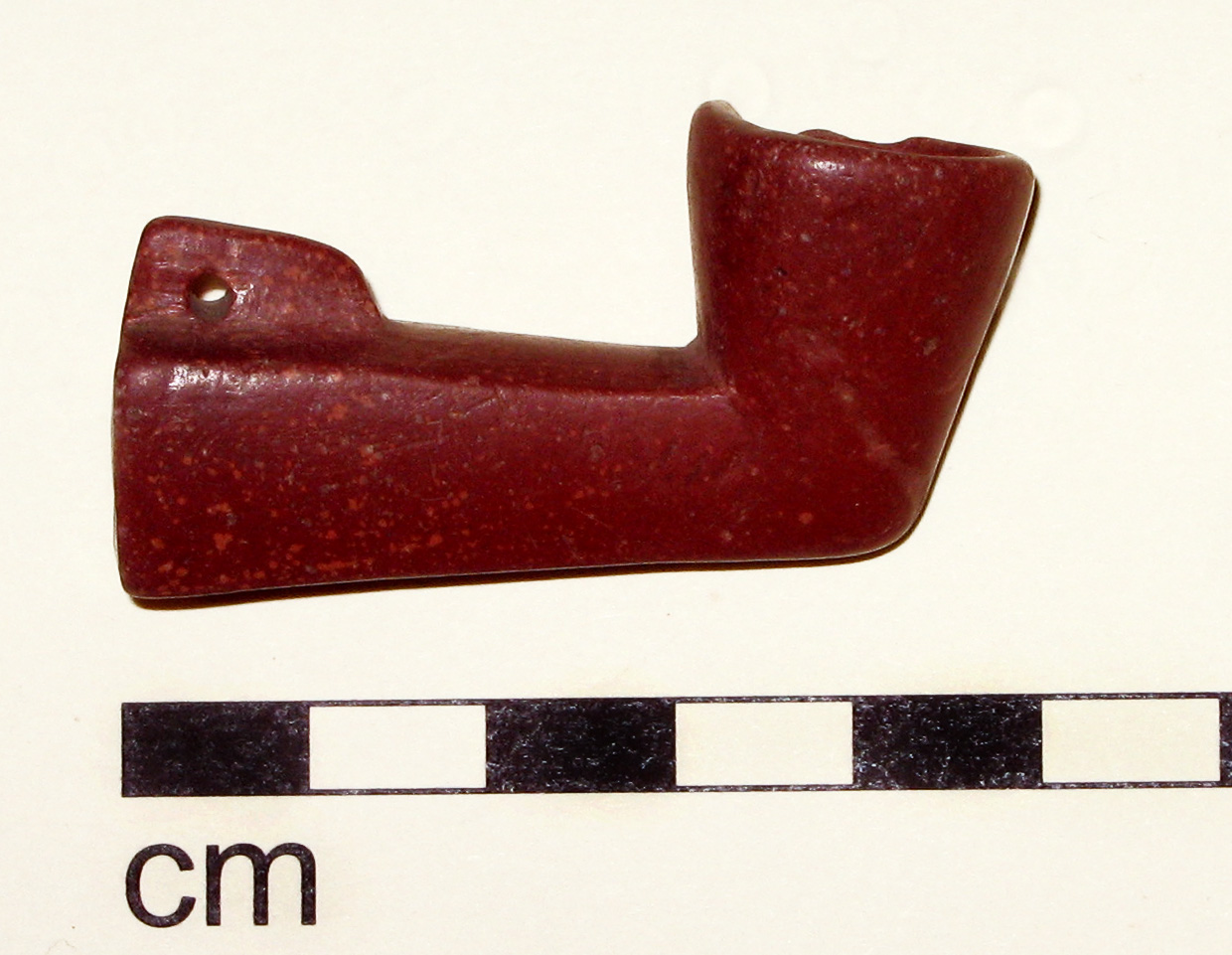
Protohistoric Catlinite pipe, probably late 17th century Ioway, from the Wanampito site in Iowa.

Catlinite, also called pipestone, is a type of argillite (metamorphosed mudstone), usually brownish-red in color, which occurs in a matrix of Sioux Quartzite. Because it is fine-grained and easily worked, it is prized by Native Americans, primarily those of the Plains nations, for use in making ceremonial pipes, known as chanunpas (Lakota: čhaŋnúŋpa). Pipestone quarries are located and preserved in Pipestone National Monument outside Pipestone, Minnesota, in Pipestone County, Minnesota, and at the Pipestone River in Ontario, Canada.

== Name ==
The term Catlinite came into use after the American painter George Catlin visited the quarries in Minnesota in 1835; but it was Philander Prescott who first wrote about the rock in 1832, noting that evidence indicated that American Indians had been using the quarries since at least as far back as 1637.

== Catlinite properties and quarries ==
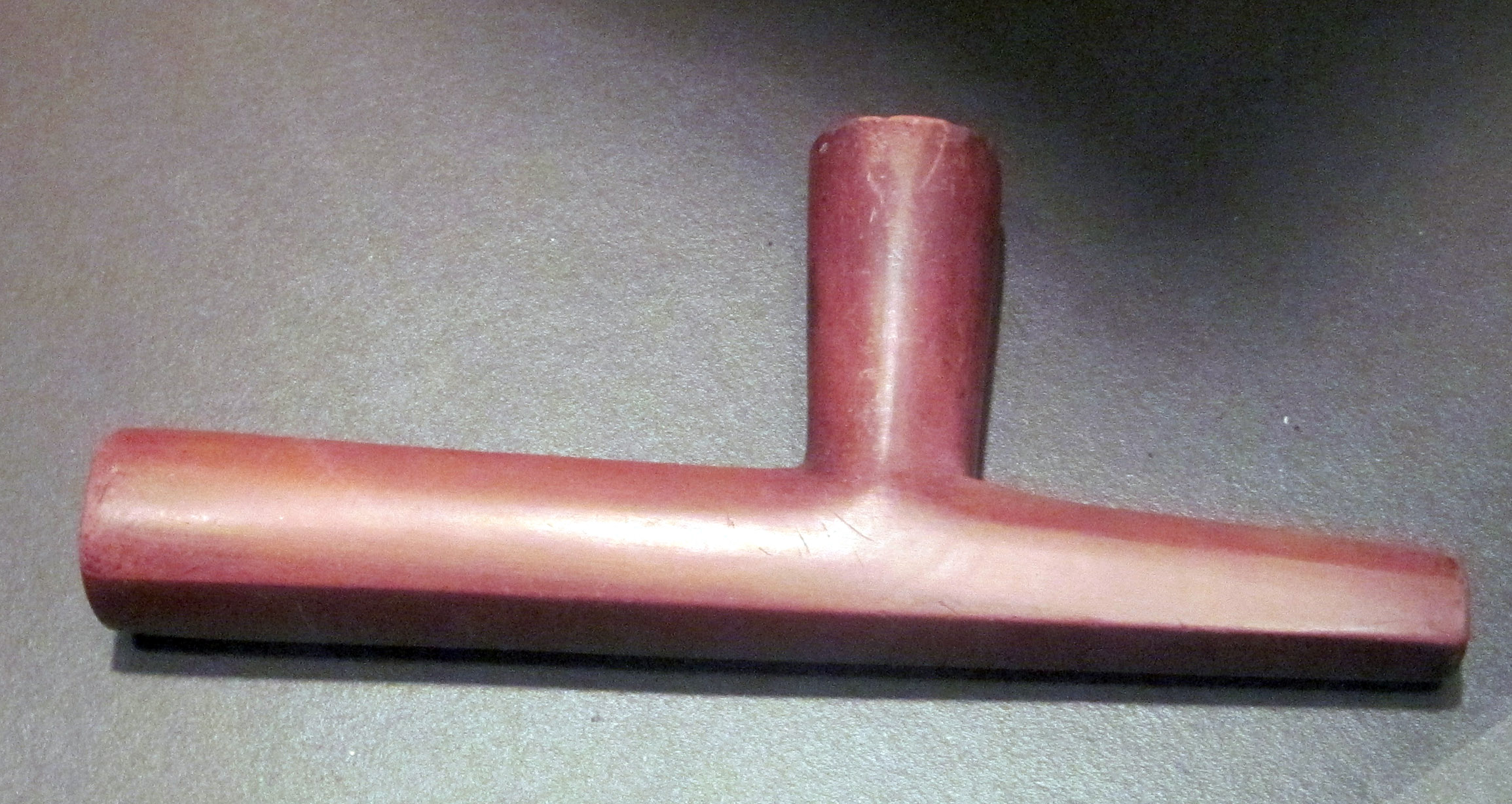
Ceremonial pipe bowl of catlinite used by Black Hawk, on display at Black Hawk State Historic Site in Illinois.

Minnesota catlinite is buttery smooth and can be cut with a regular hacksaw or even a knife. It comes out of the ground a pinkish color often with a cream layer protecting it from the hard quartzite. It is weaker and more subject to breaking under stress than Utah pipestone. Most catlinite deposits exist beneath the level of groundwater or are in deep enough layers where the soil is constantly moist as the iron compounds which give catlinite its red color quickly convert into iron oxides when exposed to the elements and the stone degrades and breaks down.

The red catlinite from the Pipestone, Minnesota, quarries is a soft claystone bed which occurs between layers of hard Sioux Quartzite. Only hand tools are used to reach the catlinite, and only enrolled Native Americans are allowed to quarry for the stone at the Pipestone National Monument, to protect it from over-mining. Another quarry with harder stone is located near Hayward, Wisconsin, on the reservation, which the Ojibwe have used for centuries.

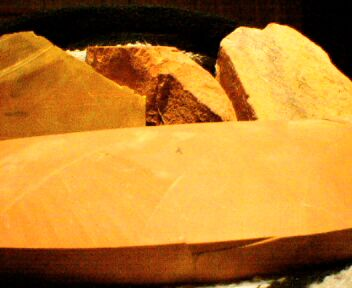
High grade red pipestone from Delta, Utah

Utah pipestone has a more variable range of hard and soft forms, since it occurs as layers between deposits of harder slates. Utah pipestone is a by-product of slate mining in Delta, Utah, and several natural deposits have been mined and used for pipemaking by Native Americans in the area for millennia.

The Canadian quarry is no longer used, although there are quarries in Canada where another type of pipestone, black stone, is gleaned. The Ojibwe use both the red and black stone for their sacred pipes.

Catlinite is often used to make the hollow tubes in pipeclay triangles.

== Other varieties of pipestone ==
A large range of pipestones exist, not just those in Minnesota, and numerous Native American tribes use a variety of materials in addition to catlinite for pipemaking.
