= Sweet Township, Pipestone County, Minnesota =

Sweet Township, Minnesota
- Township
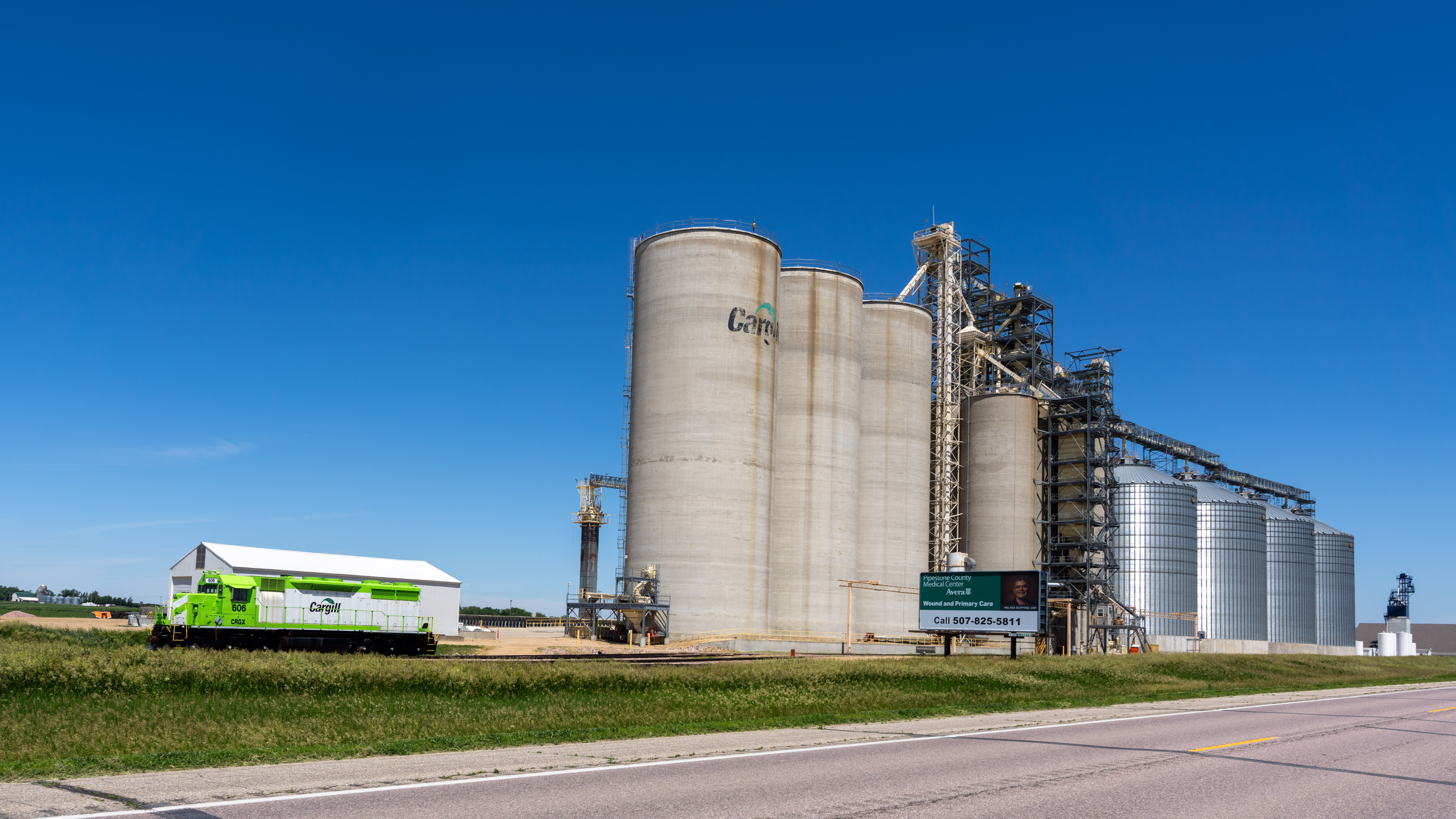
- Grain elevator in the southeastern part of Sweet Township

- Location within the state of Minnesota Sweet Township, Minnesota (the United States)
- Coordinates: 43°59′14″N 96°22′41″W
- Country: United States
- State: Minnesota
- County: Pipestone

Area
  - Total: 41.3 sq mi (107.0 km^{2})
  - Land: 41.3 sq mi (107.0 km^{2})
  - Water: 0 sq mi (0.0 km^{2})
- Elevation: 1,647 ft (502 m)

Population (2000)
  - Total: 448
  - Density: 11/sq mi (4.2/km^{2})
- Time zone: UTC-6 (Central (CST))
  - Summer (DST): UTC-5 (CDT)
- ZIP code: 56164
- Area code: 507
- FIPS code: 27-63886
- GNIS feature ID: 0665755

Sweet Township is a township in Pipestone County, Minnesota, United States. The population was 448 at the 2000 census. The unincorporated community of Airlie is located here, one mile east of the South Dakota border. The Pipestone National Monument is also located here. The township lies just outside the city of Pipestone, adjacent to the city's western and southwestern sides.

Sweet Township was incorporated in 1879, and named for Daniel E. Sweet, a pioneer settler.

== Geography ==
According to the United States Census Bureau, the township has a total area of 41.3 square miles (107.0 km^{2}), of which 41.3 square miles (107.0 km^{2}) is land and 0.02% is water.

== Demographics ==
As of the census of 2000, there were 448 people, 127 households, and 100 families residing in the township. The population density was 10.8 people per square mile (4.2/km^{2}). There were 134 housing units at an average density of 3.2/sq mi (1.3/km^{2}). The racial makeup of the township was 98.66% White, 0.45% African American, 0.67% Native American, and 0.22% from two or more races. Hispanic or Latino of any race were 0.45% of the population.

There were 127 households, out of which 40.2% had children under the age of 18 living with them, 73.2% were married couples living together, 3.1% had a female householder with no husband present, and 20.5% were non-families. 16.5% of all households were made up of individuals, and 9.4% had someone living alone who was 65 years of age or older. The average household size was 2.71 and the average family size was 3.08.

In the township the population was spread out, with 22.5% under the age of 18, 4.5% from 18 to 24, 20.5% from 25 to 44, 18.1% from 45 to 64, and 34.4% who were 65 years of age or older. The median age was 47 years. For every 100 females, there were 82.1 males. For every 100 females age 18 and over, there were 78.9 males.

The median income for a household in the township was $45,208, and the median income for a family was $47,500. Males had a median income of $30,313 versus $26,250 for females. The per capita income for the township was $18,385. About 11.8% of families and 11.9% of the population were below the poverty line, including 18.3% of those under age 18 and 2.1% of those age 65 or over.

== Politics ==
Sweet Township is located in Minnesota's 1st congressional district, represented by Mankato educator Tim Walz, a Democrat. At the state level, Sweet Township is located in Senate District 22, represented by Republican Doug Magnus, and in House District 22A, represented by Republican Joe Schomacker.
