= Gray Township, Pipestone County, Minnesota =

Gray Township, Minnesota
- Township
- Location within the state of Minnesota Gray Township, Minnesota (the United States)
- Coordinates: 43°58′36″N 96°15′27″W
- Country: United States
- State: Minnesota
- County: Pipestone

Area
  - Total: 33.5 sq mi (86.7 km^{2})
  - Land: 33.5 sq mi (86.7 km^{2})
  - Water: 0 sq mi (0.0 km^{2})
- Elevation: 1,749 ft (533 m)

Population (2000)
  - Total: 234
  - Density: 7.0/sq mi (2.7/km^{2})
- Time zone: UTC-6 (Central (CST))
  - Summer (DST): UTC-5 (CDT)
- FIPS code: 27-25478
- GNIS feature ID: 0664333

Gray Township is a township in Pipestone County, Minnesota, United States. The population was 234 at the 2000 census.

Gray Township was organized in 1879, and named for Andrew O. Gray, a pioneer settler.

== Geography ==
According to the United States Census Bureau, the township has a total area of 33.5 square miles (87 km^{2}), all land.

== Demographics ==
As of the census of 2000, there were 234 people, 85 households, and 66 families residing in the township. The population density was 7.0 inhabitants per square mile (2.7/km^{2}). There were 92 housing units at an average density of 2.7 per square mile (1.0/km^{2}). The racial makeup of the township was 98.29% White and 1.71% Native American.

There were 85 households, out of which 37.6% had children under the age of 18 living with them, 74.1% were married couples living together, 1.2% had a female householder with no husband present, and 21.2% were non-families. 17.6% of all households were made up of individuals, and 7.1% had someone living alone who was 65 years of age or older. The average household size was 2.75 and the average family size was 3.10.

In the township the population was spread out, with 30.3% under the age of 18, 3.8% from 18 to 24, 25.2% from 25 to 44, 25.6% from 45 to 64, and 15.0% who were 65 years of age or older. The median age was 40 years. For every 100 females, there were 114.7 males. For every 100 females age 18 and over, there were 117.3 males.

The median income for a household in the township was $46,875, and the median income for a family was $47,292. Males had a median income of $31,000 versus $20,750 for females. The per capita income for the township was $28,770. About 2.8% of families and 3.2% of the population were below the poverty line, including none of those under the age of eighteen and 6.3% of those 65 or over.

== Politics ==
Gray Township is located in Minnesota's 1st congressional district, represented by Michelle Fischbach, a Republican. At the state level, Gray Township is located in Senate District 21, represented by Republican Bill Weber, and in House District 21A, represented by Republican Joe Schomacker.
