= Osborne Township, Pipestone County, Minnesota =

Osborne Township, Minnesota
- Township
- Location within the state of Minnesota Osborne Township, Minnesota (the United States)
- Coordinates: 43°53′38″N 96°7′43″W
- Country: United States
- State: Minnesota
- County: Pipestone

Area
  - Total: 34.9 sq mi (90.4 km^{2})
  - Land: 34.9 sq mi (90.4 km^{2})
  - Water: 0 sq mi (0.0 km^{2})
- Elevation: 1,621 ft (494 m)

Population (2000)
  - Total: 324
  - Density: 9.3/sq mi (3.6/km^{2})
- Time zone: UTC-6 (Central (CST))
  - Summer (DST): UTC-5 (CDT)
- ZIP code: 56128
- Area code: 507
- FIPS code: 27-48832
- GNIS feature ID: 0665226

Osborne Township is a township in Pipestone County, Minnesota, United States. The population was 324 at the 2000 census.

Osborne Township was organized in 1879, and named for J. C. Osborne, the cousin of a first settler.

== Geography ==
According to the United States Census Bureau, the township has a total area of 34.9 square miles (90.4 km^{2}), all land.

== Demographics ==
As of the census of 2000, there were 324 people, 116 households, and 101 families residing in the township. The population density was 9.3 people per square mile (3.6/km^{2}). There were 127 housing units at an average density of 3.6/sq mi (1.4/km^{2}). The racial makeup of the township was 99.38% White, and 0.62% from two or more races. Hispanic or Latino of any race were 0.62% of the population.

There were 116 households, out of which 37.9% had children under the age of 18 living with them, 84.5% were married couples living together, 0.9% had a female householder with no husband present, and 12.9% were non-families. 12.1% of all households were made up of individuals, and 2.6% had someone living alone who was 65 years of age or older. The average household size was 2.79 and the average family size was 3.05.

In the township the population was spread out, with 26.9% under the age of 18, 7.1% from 18 to 24, 27.8% from 25 to 44, 30.2% from 45 to 64, and 8.0% who were 65 years of age or older. The median age was 39 years. For every 100 females, there were 118.9 males. For every 100 females age 18 and over, there were 111.6 males.

The median income for a household in the township was $37,083, and the median income for a family was $42,750. Males had a median income of $27,250 versus $17,500 for females. The per capita income for the township was $15,959. About 7.5% of families and 9.6% of the population were below the poverty line, including 20.0% of those under age 18 and none of those age 65 or over.

== Politics ==
Osborne Township is located in Minnesota's 1st congressional district, represented by Mankato educator Tim Walz, a Democrat. At the state level, Osborne Township is located in Senate District 22, represented by Republican Doug Magnus, and in House District 22A, represented by Republican Joe Schomacker.
