= Elmer Township, Pipestone County, Minnesota =

Elmer Township, Minnesota
- Township
- Location within the state of Minnesota Elmer Township, Minnesota (the United States)
- Coordinates: 43°53′19″N 96°14′23″W
- Country: United States
- State: Minnesota
- County: Pipestone

Area
  - Total: 35.3 sq mi (91.3 km^{2})
  - Land: 35.3 sq mi (91.3 km^{2})
  - Water: 0 sq mi (0.0 km^{2})
- Elevation: 1,713 ft (522 m)

Population (2000)
  - Total: 275
  - Density: 7.8/sq mi (3/km^{2})
- Time zone: UTC-6 (Central (CST))
  - Summer (DST): UTC-5 (CDT)
- FIPS code: 27-18908
- GNIS feature ID: 0664082

Elmer Township is a township in Pipestone County, Minnesota, United States. The population was 275 at the 2000 census.

Elmer Township was organized in 1879.

== Geography ==
According to the United States Census Bureau, the township has a total area of 35.2 square miles (91 km^{2}), all land.

== Demographics ==
As of the census of 2000, there were 275 people, 88 households, and 74 families residing in the township. The population density was 7.8 inhabitants per square mile (3.0/km^{2}). There were 92 housing units at an average density of 2.6 per square mile (1.0/km^{2}). The racial makeup of the township was 95.64% White, 0.36% Asian, 0.36% from other races, and 3.64% from two or more races. Hispanic or Latino of any race were 2.91% of the population.

There were 88 households, out of which 46.6% had children under the age of 18 living with them, 83.0% were married couples living together, 1.1% had a female householder with no husband present, and 14.8% were non-families. 13.6% of all households were made up of individuals, and 5.7% had someone living alone who was 65 years of age or older. The average household size was 3.13 and the average family size was 3.48.

In the township the population was spread out, with 36.0% under the age of 18, 5.1% from 18 to 24, 31.6% from 25 to 44, 14.9% from 45 to 64, and 12.4% who were 65 years of age or older. The median age was 35 years. For every 100 females, there were 99.3 males. For every 100 females age 18 and over, there were 109.5 males.

The median income for a household in the township was $44,250, and the median income for a family was $47,000. Males had a median income of $30,000 versus $21,000 for females. The per capita income for the township was $15,772. None of the families and 0.6% of the population were living below the poverty line, including no under eighteens and 4.4% of those over 64.

== Politics ==
Elmer Township is located in Minnesota's 1st congressional district, represented by Mankato educator Tim Walz, a Democrat. At the state level, Elmer Township is located in Senate District 22, represented by Republican Doug Magnus, and in House District 22A, represented by Republican Joe Schomacker.
