= Pipestone National Monument =

- U.S. National Register of Historic Places
- U.S. Historic district
- U.S. National Monument
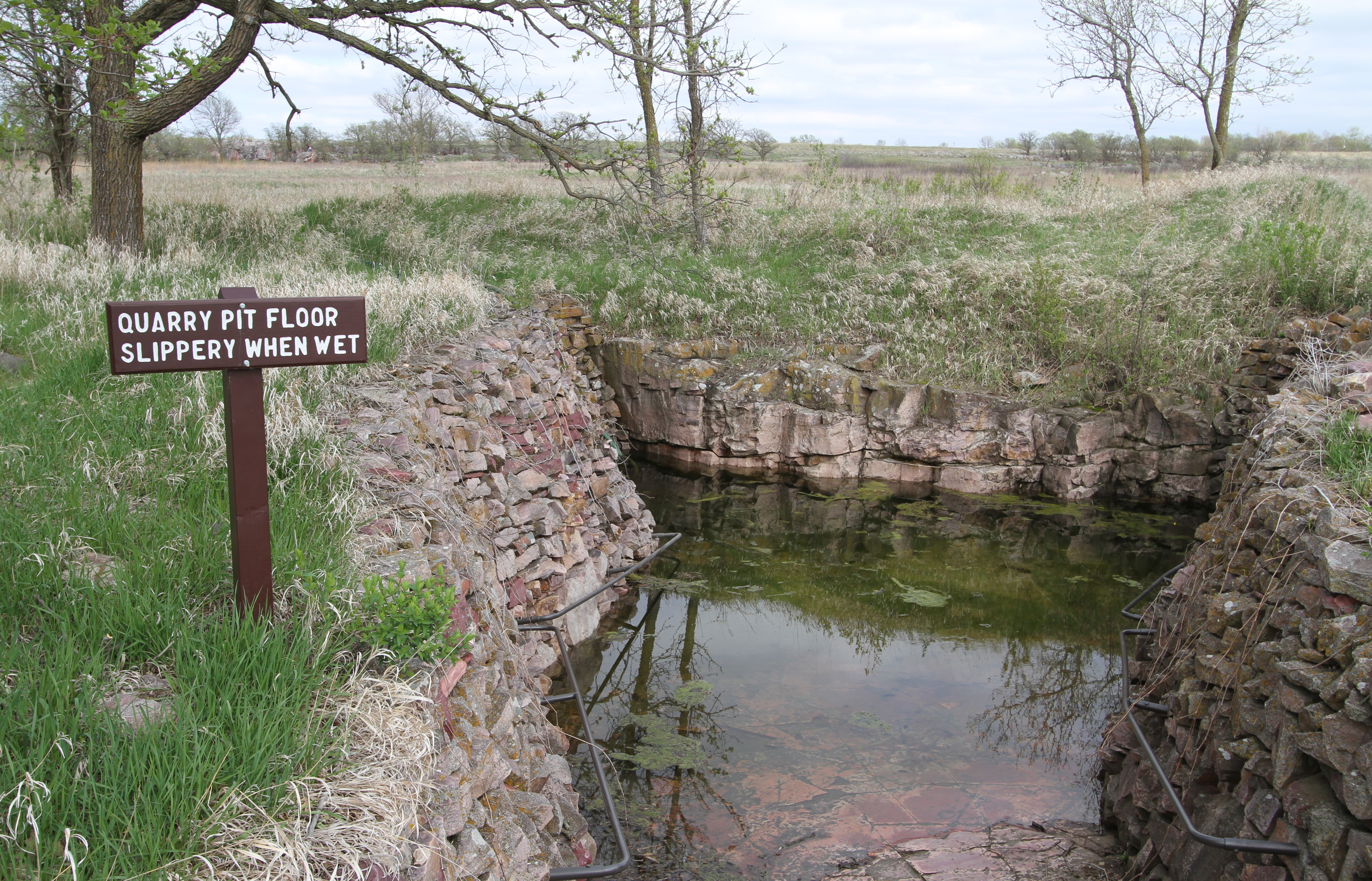

- Location within Minnesota Location within the United States
- Interactive map of Pipestone National Monument
- Location: Sweet Township, Pipestone County, Minnesota
- Nearest city: Pipestone, Minnesota
- Coordinates: 44°0′48″N 96°19′30″W
- Area: 281.78 acres (114.03 ha)
- Visitation: 73,267 (2019)
- Website: Pipestone National Monument
- MPS: Pipestone County MRA (AD)
- NRHP reference No.: 66000112

Significant dates
- Designated HD: October 15, 1966
- Designated NMON: August 25, 1937

Pipestone National Monument is a national monument located in southwestern Minnesota, just north of the city of Pipestone. Lying along U.S. Route 75, Minnesota State Highway 23 and Minnesota State Highway 30, it is home to catlinite rock quarries culturally significant to 23 Native Americans tribal nations of North America.

Those known to have actually occupied the site chronologically are the Yankton Dakota, Iowa, and Omaha peoples. The quarries were considered a neutral territory in the historic past where all tribal nations could quarry “pipestone” for ceremonial pipes vitally important to Plains Indian traditional practices.

Archeologists believe the site has been in use for over 3000 years, with Minnesota pipestone having been found in ancient North American burial mounds across a large geographic area.

== History ==
From the 15th to 18th centuries the Iowa people lived by the quarry. By the late 1700s, the Sioux were the dominant tribe in the area. On October 11, 1849, the 5th Resolution passed by the Minnesota Territorial Legislature was to send a block of pipestone collected by then governor Henry H. Sibley as a memorial stone to the Washington Memorial in Washington, D.C. The red stone is referred as ínyanša in the Dakota/Lakota language. In 1851 the Sisseton and Wahpeton bands of the Dakota signed the Traverse des Sioux treaty ceding southwest Minnesota to the U.S. government including the quarry. However, some of that ceded land was claimed by the Yankton people and they were not present nor signers of the treaty. To protect the site, the Yankton Dakota secured unrestricted access via article 8 of the Yankton Treaty signed on April 19, 1858. That created a one-mile square reservation, of over 600 acres, which was encroached upon by settlers multiple times. In 1891, the United States took a 100 acre parcel of the Yankton's Pipestone Reservation to build the Pipestone Indian School. As the U.S. government started the process of taking possession of the Yankton Reservation in 1899, the quarry again reached the news. The Yankton tribe contested this seizure as illegal taking their claim to the U.S Supreme Court. The court ruled in their favor in 1926 and ordered that they be compensated. Afterwards, the land came under full control of the U.S. Government. The Pipestone Indian Training School closed in 1953 with the acreage remaining from the school transferred to the Minnesota Department of Natural Resources to create the Pipestone Wildlife Management Area. A boundary change occurred on June 18, 1956 with the original reservation reduced to just 108 acres.

The National Monument was established by an act of Congress on August 25, 1937, with the establishing legislation reaffirming the quarrying rights of the Native Americans. Any enrolled member of a federally recognized American Indian tribe may apply for a free quarry permit to dig for the pipestone. The National Park Service regularly consults with representatives from 23 affiliated tribal nations to discuss land management practices, historic preservation, exhibit design, and other facets of the park's management. The historic area is listed on the National Register of Historic Places under the heading "Cannomok'e—Pipestone National Monument". Cannomok'e means "pipestone quarry" in the Dakota language. The pipestone quarries within the monument are also designated as a Minnesota State Historic Site.

== Pipemaking ==
The Upper Midwest Indian Cultural Center is located inside the national monument's visitor center, and during the summer months sponsors demonstrations of pipemaking by Native craftworkers using the stone from the quarries. Local Native Americans carve the stones using techniques passed down from their ancestors. Many of the demonstrators are third or fourth generation pipe makers.

The Smithsonian Institution's National Museum of the American Indian has an extensive collection of 705 catlinite objects that it attributes to the Pipestone quarry, 585 of which are pipes.

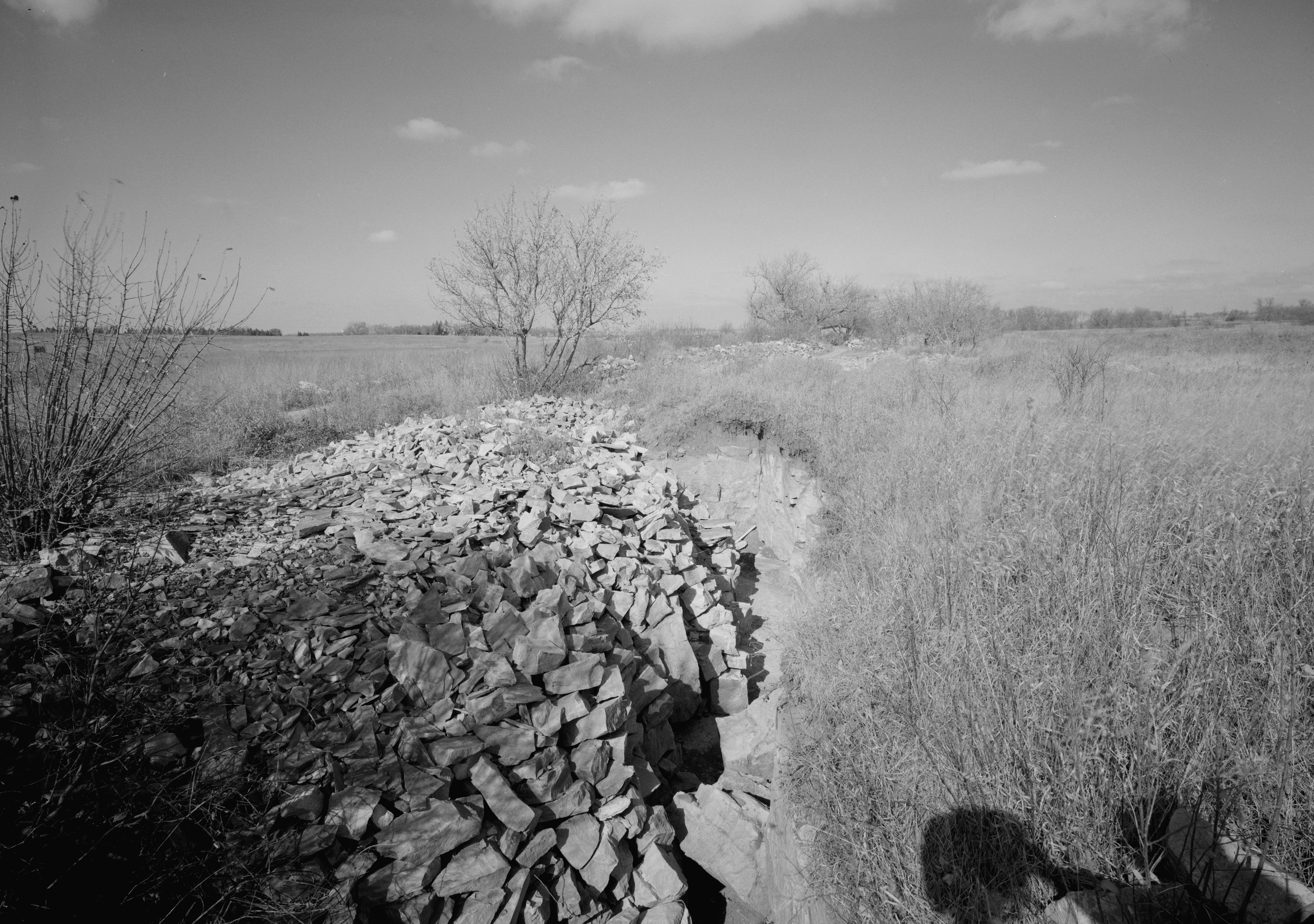
Historic pipestone quarry

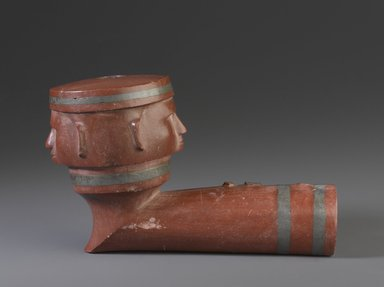
Inlaid Pipe Bowl with Two Faces, collected at Fort Snelling 1833-36

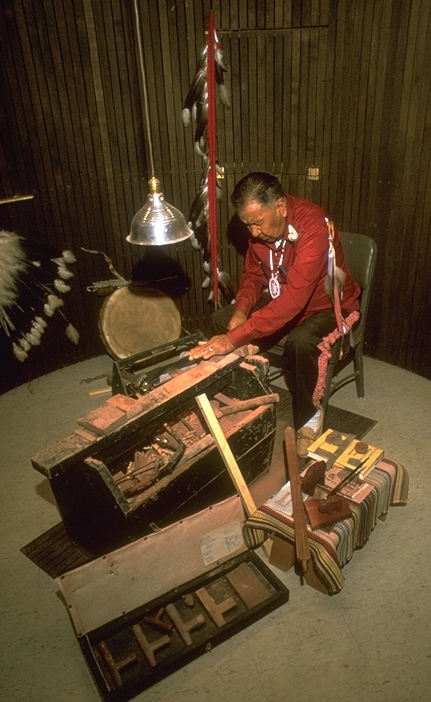
Pipestone crafting demonstration at Pipestone National Monument

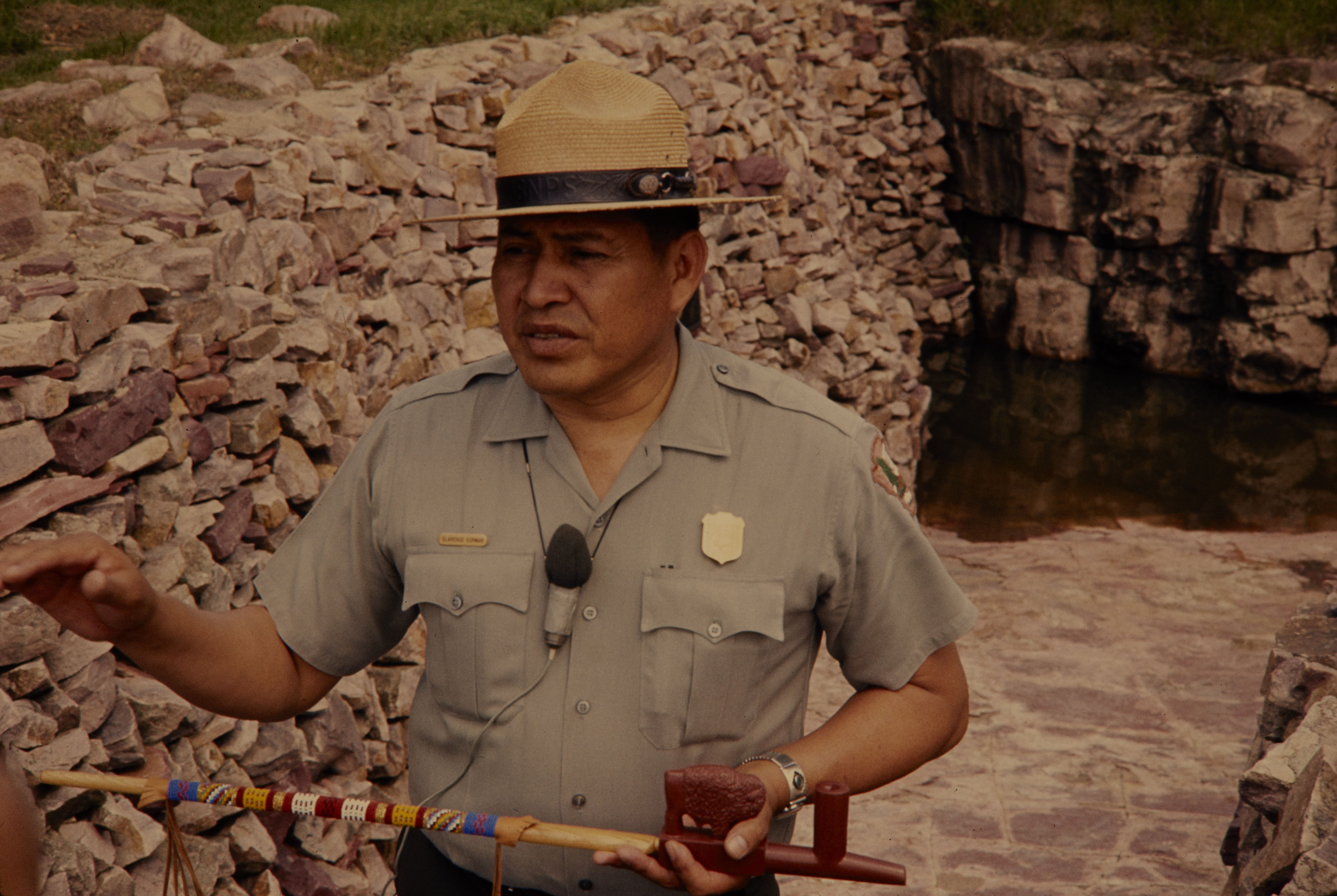
An NPS ranger holding a pipe at the quarry

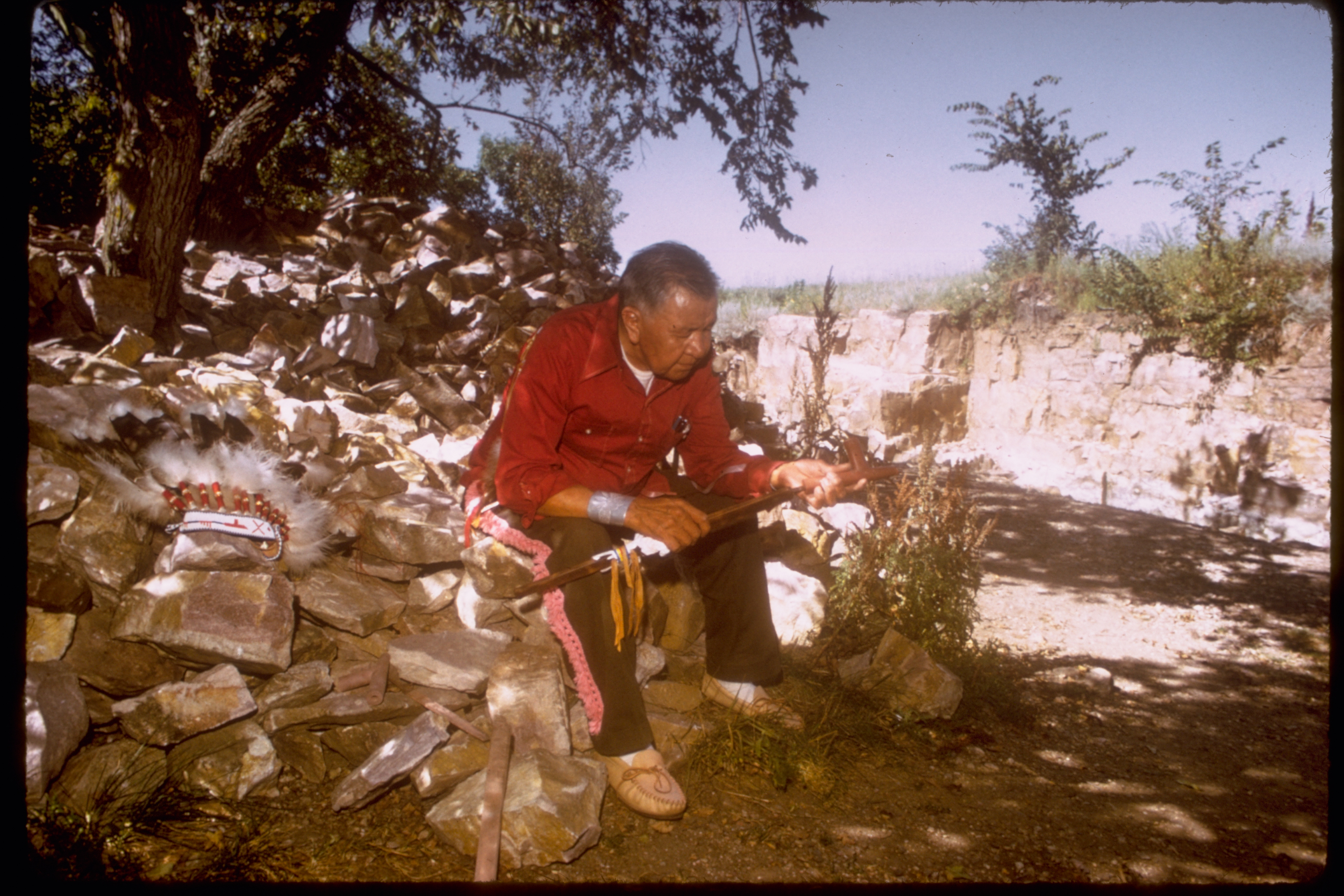
American Indian holding a pipe at Pipestone National Monument

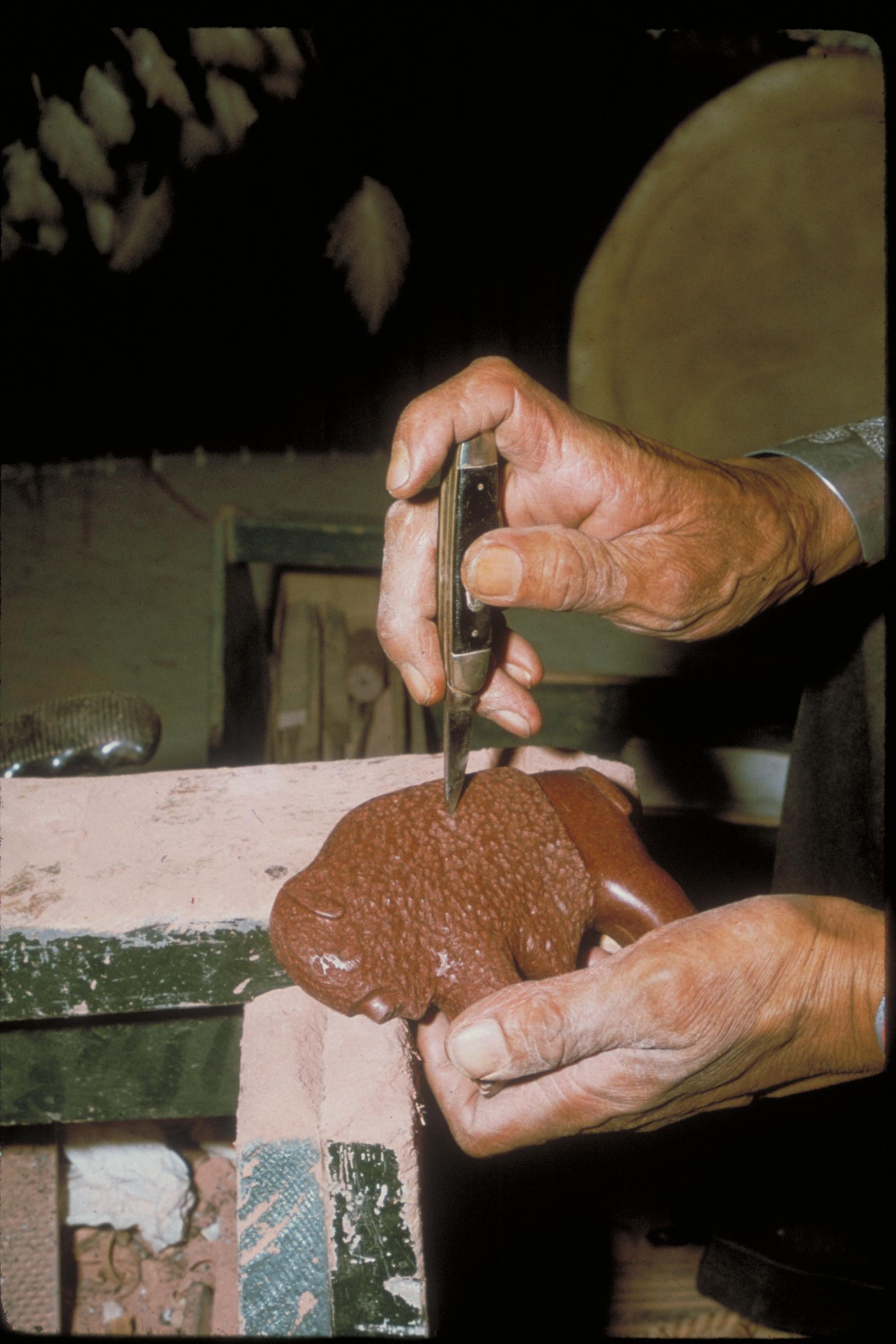
Pipestone carving at Pipestone National Monument

== Attractions ==
Visitors can walk along a three-quarter mile (1.2 km) self-guided trail to view the pipestone quarries and a waterfall. A trail guide is available at the visitor center. About 260 acres (1.1 km^{2}) of the national monument has been restored to native tallgrass prairie. Monument staff burn prairie parcels on a rotating basis to control weeds and stimulate growth of native grasses. This habitat hosts many native wildlife species, including bird species such as bobolink and eastern kingbird. A larger area of restored tallgrass prairie and a small bison herd are maintained by the Minnesota DNR at Blue Mounds State Park, 20 miles (32 km) to the south. The visitor center features exhibits about the natural and cultural history of the site, including a display of the petroglyphs found around the quarry. There is also an orientation video about the history of the pipestone quarries.

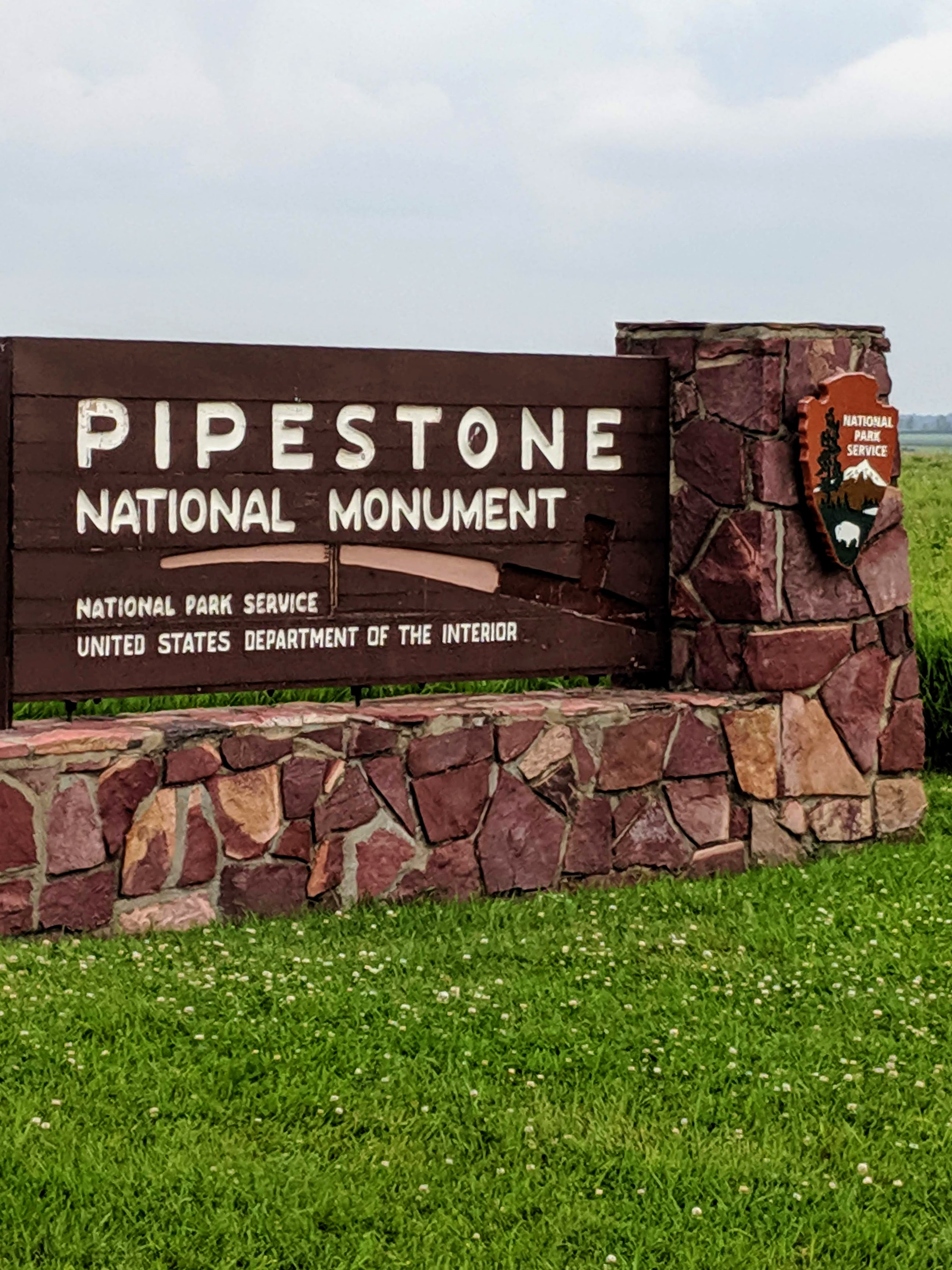
Park entrance sign

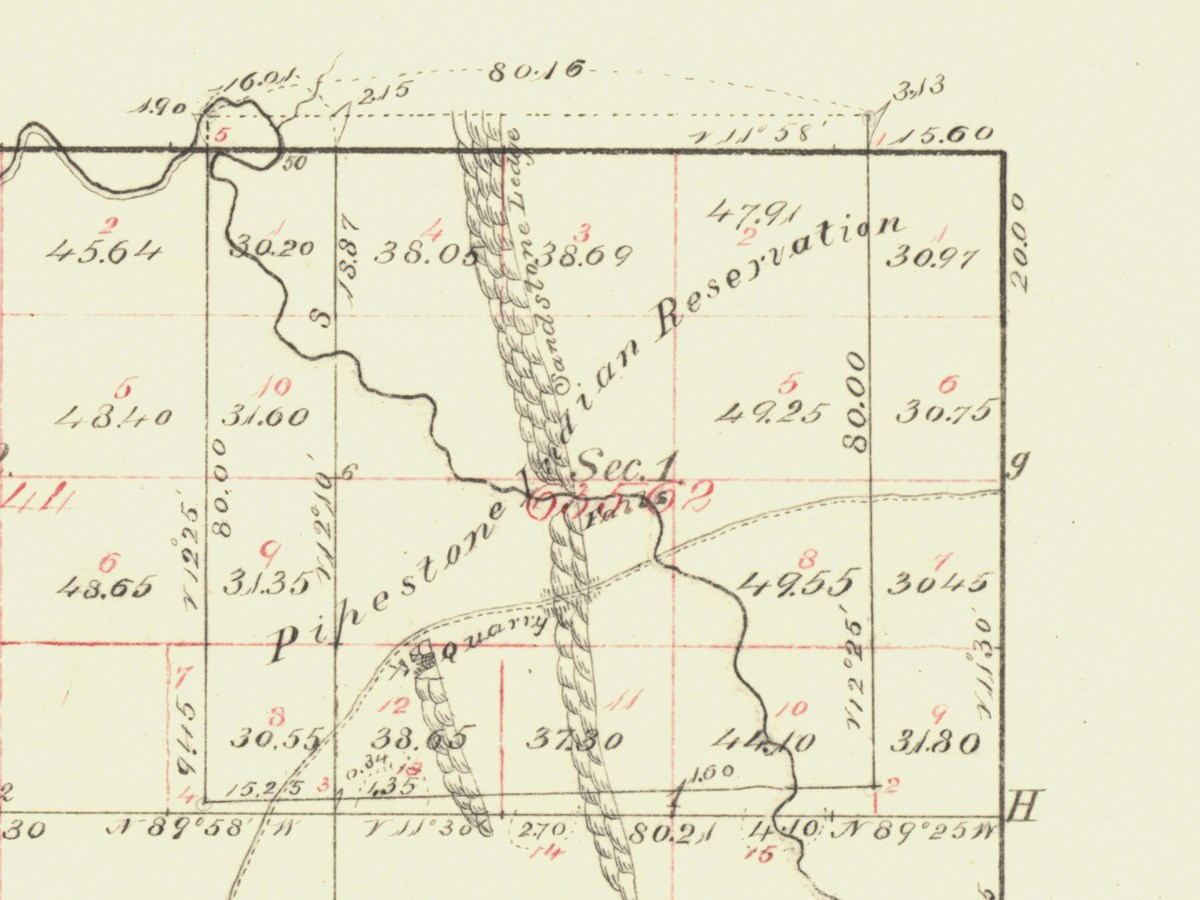
1872 Land plat of the Yankton Sioux Pipestone Reservation held by the National Park Service

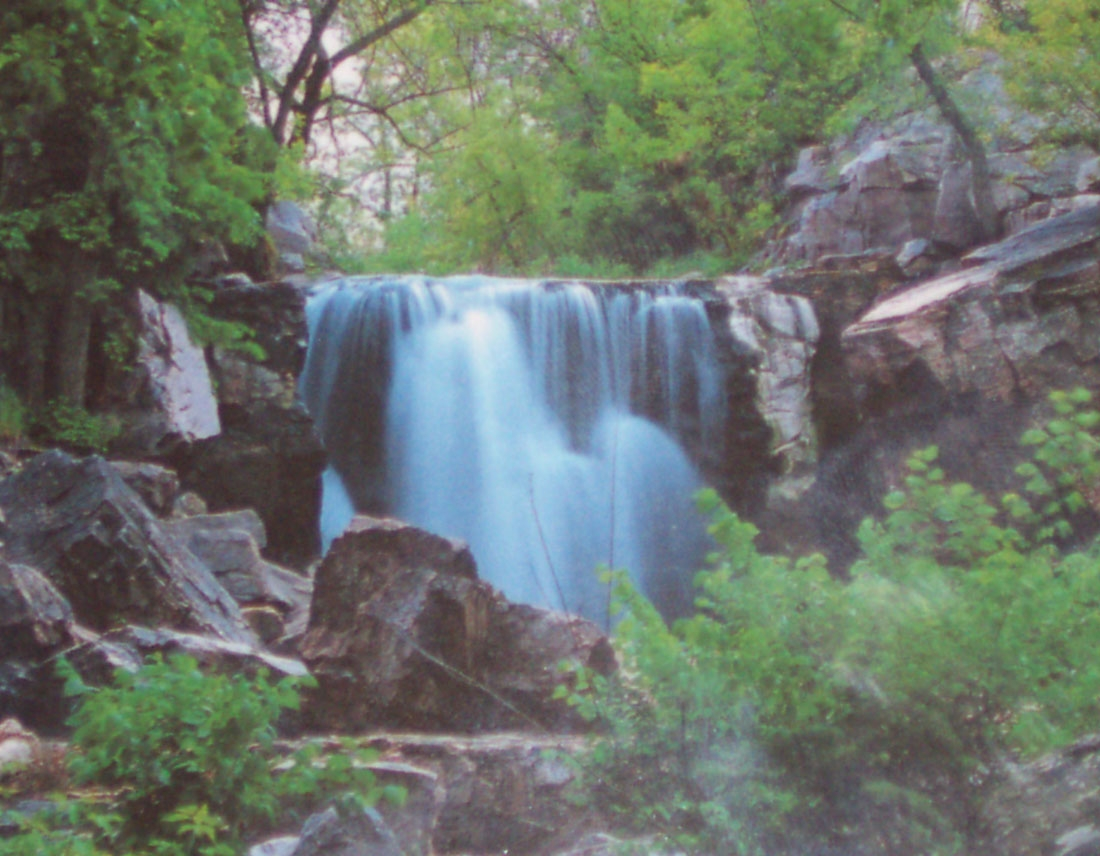
Winnewissa falls

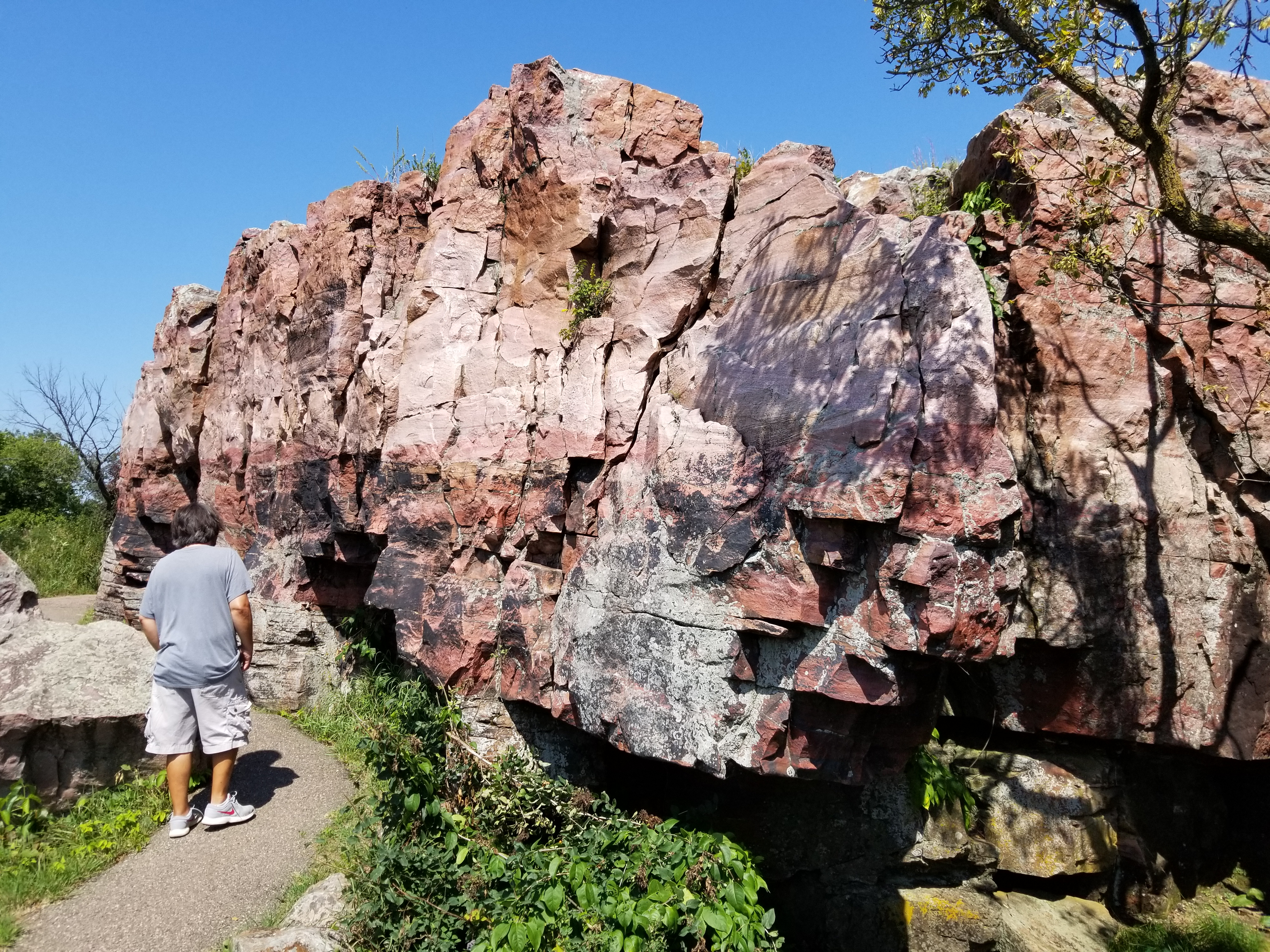
Red quartzite cliffs along the trail

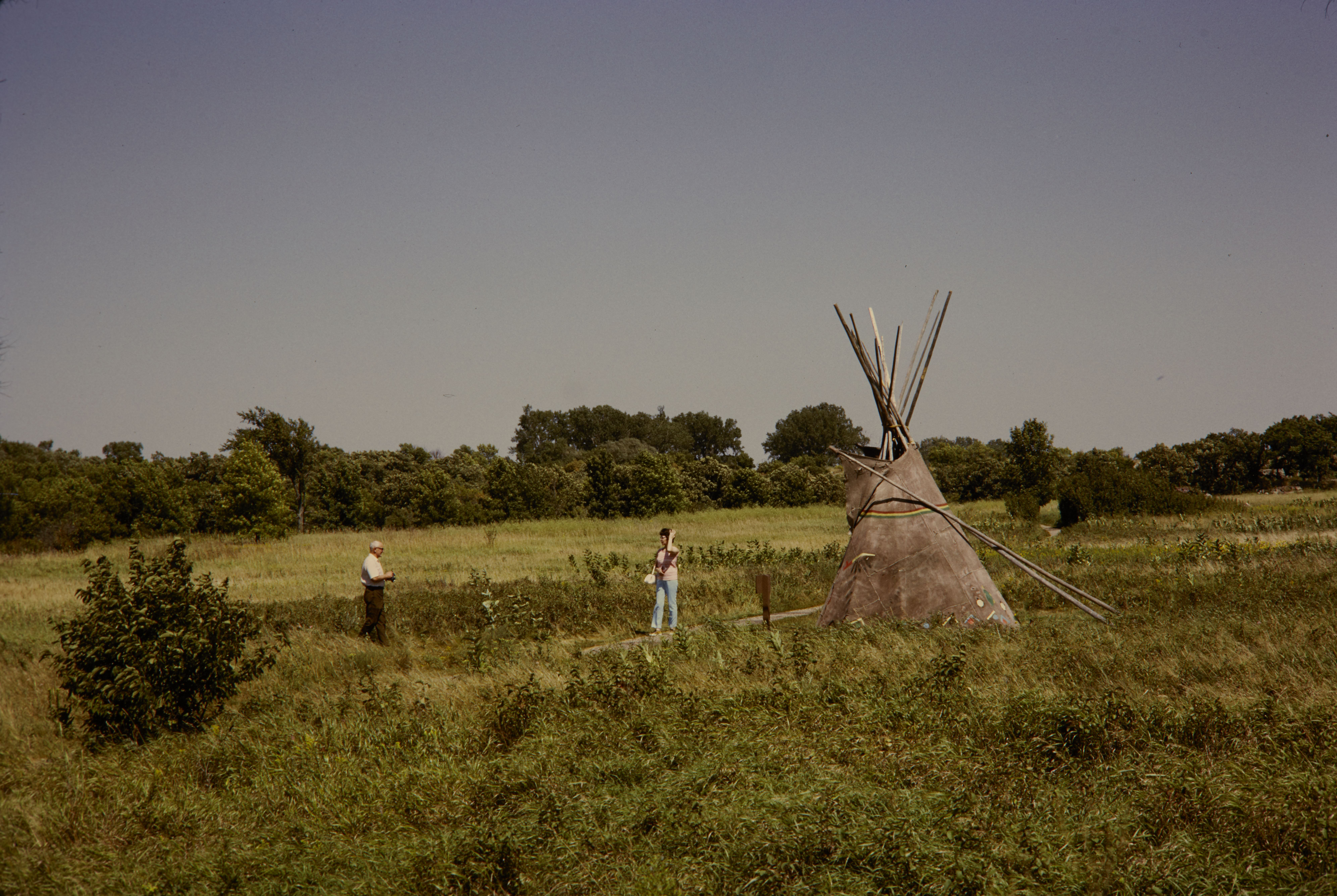
Visitors taking photos next to a tipi

== See also ==
- List of national monuments of the United States
