= National Register of Historic Places listings in Pipestone County, Minnesota =

Location of Pipestone County in Minnesota

This is a list of the National Register of Historic Places listings in Pipestone County, Minnesota. It is intended to be a complete list of the properties and districts on the National Register of Historic Places in Pipestone County, Minnesota, United States. The locations of National Register properties and districts for which the latitude and longitude coordinates are included below, may be seen in an online map.

There are 15 properties and districts listed on the National Register in the county, including one National Monument. A supplementary list includes two additional sites that were formerly on the National Register. Many of Pipestone County's listings are constructed of locally quarried Sioux Quartzite.

This National Park Service list is complete through NPS recent listings posted July 17, 2026.

== Current listings ==
	Name on the Register	Image	Date listed	Location	City or town	Description
1	Bauman Hall	Bauman Hall	March 3, 1980 (#80002116)	201 West Wall Street; 43°50′59″N 96°23′56″W	Jasper	1891 vestige of the abandoned town of North Sioux Falls, Minnesota, relocated circa 1893 as the first in a row of Sioux Quartzite buildings on Jasper's main street.
2	Burlington Cedar Rapids and Northern Depot	Burlington Cedar Rapids and Northern Depot	March 3, 1980 (#80002124)	400 North Hiawatha Avenue; 44°00′14″N 96°19′05″W	Pipestone	1890 railway station symbolizing the importance of railroads in southwestern Minnesota's development.
3	Calumet Hotel	Calumet Hotel	March 16, 1976 (#76001066)	104 West Main Street; 44°00′01″N 96°19′04″W	Pipestone	1888 hotel listed for its architectural prominence and importance to Pipestone's early commerce. Also a contributing property to the Pipestone Commercial Historic District.
4	Cannomok'e-Pipestone National Monument	Cannomok'e-Pipestone National Monument	October 15, 1966 (#66000112)	36 Reservation Avenue; 44°00′48″N 96°19′30″W	Pipestone vicinity	Primary source of pipestone quarried by Plains Indians from prehistory to present for ceremonial pipes and other sacred or artistic items. Now a National Park unit.
5	Gerber Hospital and Garage	Gerber Hospital and Garage	March 3, 1980 (#80002119)	120 East Wall Street; 43°51′00″N 96°23′45″W	Jasper	Hospital clinic built circa 1913, noted for its unusual use of Sioux Quartzite on a Stick style design.
6	Ihlen Mercantile Company	Ihlen Mercantile Company	March 3, 1980 (#80002115)	Holman Street and Sherman Avenue; 43°54′30″N 96°22′07″W	Ihlen	1892 home of Ihlen's first business, also noted as southwestern Minnesota's most intact frame commercial building. Likely demolished (see talk page).
7	Jasper School Building	Jasper School Building	June 17, 2019 (#100004075)	100 N. Hill Ave. 43°51′01″N 96°23′37″W	Jasper	Five-section school in service 1911–2001, illustrating Jasper's distinctive use of Sioux Quartzite across multiple decades and architectural styles as well as its evolving educational priorities.
8	Pipestone Commercial Historic District	Pipestone Commercial Historic District	May 2, 1977 (#77000761)	Along Main Street between Second Avenue NW/SW and Second Avenue NE/SE; 44°00′02″N 96°19′03″W	Pipestone	Two-block district featuring Minnesota's greatest concentration of Sioux Quartzite buildings, with 22 contributing properties mostly dating to the 1890s.
9	Pipestone County Courthouse	Pipestone County Courthouse	March 3, 1980 (#80002121)	416 South Hiawatha; 43°59′51″N 96°19′06″W	Pipestone	1900 courthouse, significant as the county's seat of government and most elaborate architecture and use of Sioux Quartzite.
10	Pipestone Indian School Superintendent's House	Pipestone Indian School Superintendent's House	April 5, 1993 (#93000232)	Off North Hiawatha Avenue; 44°01′15″N 96°19′11″W	Pipestone	1907 staff housing, a rare vestige in Minnesota of federal Native American boarding schools such as Pipestone Indian School, which operated 1892–1953.
11	Pipestone Public Library	Pipestone Public Library	March 3, 1980 (#80002122)	317 South Hiawatha Avenue; 43°59′55″N 96°19′02″W	Pipestone	1904 Carnegie library also significant for its architecture, designed by Joseph Schwartz in Sioux Quartzite.
12	Pipestone Water Tower	Pipestone Water Tower	March 3, 1980 (#80002123)	Second Street, N.E. 44°00′06″N 96°18′39″W	Pipestone	1920 water tower, one of the first to be built with concrete. Designer L.P. Wolff pioneered the method in 1918 for the nearly identical Brainerd Water Tower in Brainerd, Minnesota.
13	John M. Poorbaugh Block	John M. Poorbaugh Block	January 12, 2023 (#100008546)	102 East Wall St. 43°51′00″N 96°23′49″W	Jasper	One of Jasper's best surviving examples of its distinctive Sioux Quartzite commercial buildings, built in 1889, and the home 1917–1972 of its long-serving local newspaper, the Jasper Journal. Now the Jasper Museum.
14	John Rowe House	John Rowe House	March 3, 1980 (#80002118)	200 East Second Street; 43°51′04″N 96°23′44″W	Jasper	Unusual stone bungalow built circa 1905, juxtaposing a common design with an atypical construction material.
15	Split Rock Bridge	Split Rock Bridge	November 6, 1989 (#89001823)	County Road 54 over Split Rock Creek; 43°53′31″N 96°22′02″W	Ihlen vicinity	Quartzite arch bridge built 1937–38, noted for its aesthetic simplicity and 50-foot (15 m) length—the longest stone arch span on a Minnesota highway.

== Former listings ==
	Name on the Register	Image	Date listed	Date removed	Location	City or town	Description
1	Christianson House and Store		March 3, 1980 (#80002117)	March 28, 1990	208 East Second Street	Jasper	1888 department store and residence. Moved in 1981.
2	Stordahl Building		March 3, 1980 (#80002120)	July 23, 2026	119 West Wall Street; 43°50′59″N 96°23′54″W	Jasper	Nominated as one of Jasper's earliest and most intact quartzite buildings, constructed in 1894. Second floor has since been removed.

== See also ==
- List of National Historic Landmarks in Minnesota
- National Register of Historic Places listings in Minnesota
