= John Rowe House =

Historic house in Minnesota, United States

- U.S. National Register of Historic Places
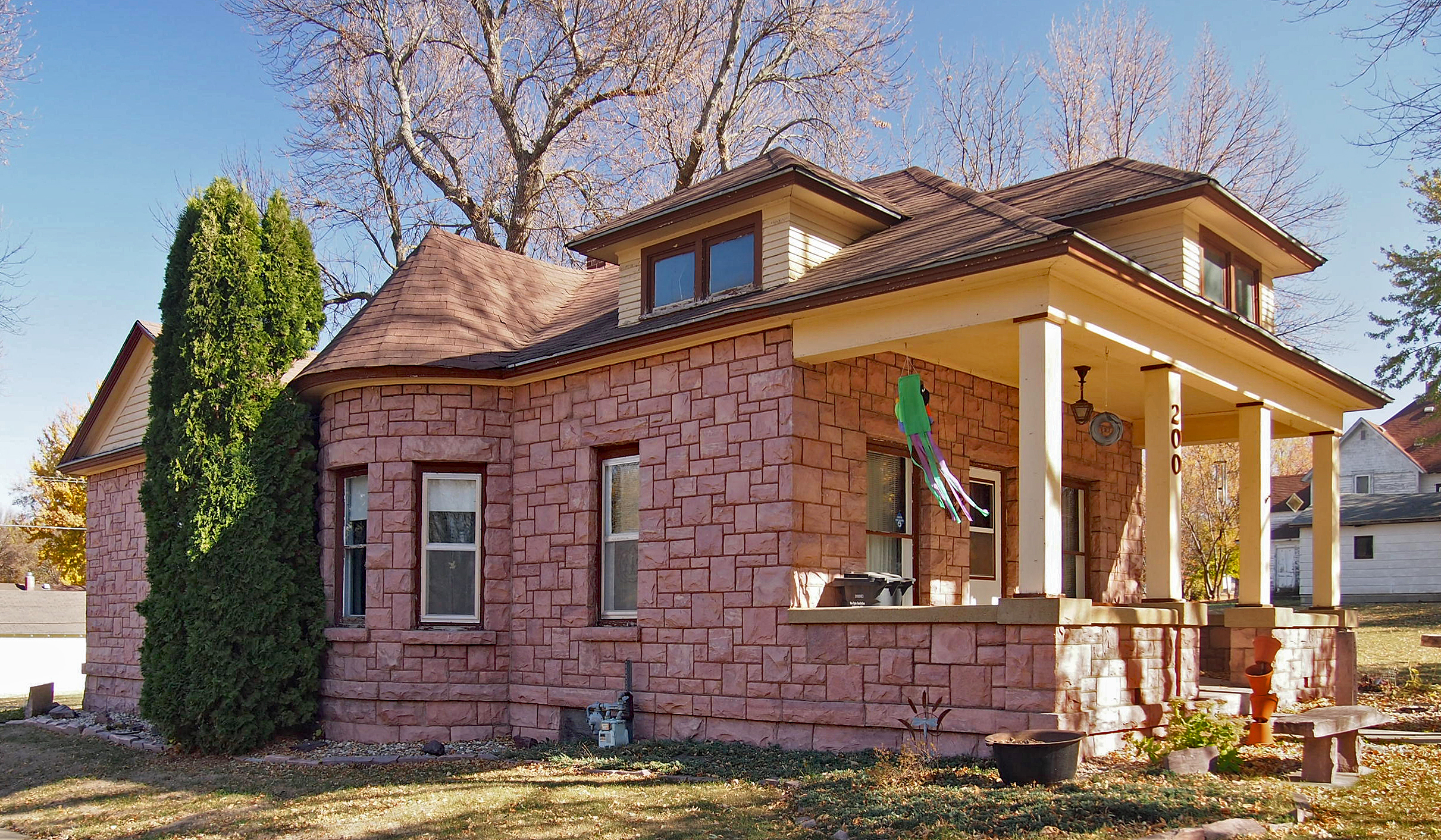
- The John Rowe House from the southwest

- Location within Minnesota Location within the United States
- Location: 200 E. 2nd Street, Jasper, Minnesota
- Coordinates: 43°51′3″N 96°23′44″W
- Area: less than one acre
- Built: 1903
- NRHP reference No.: 80002118
- Added to NRHP: March 3, 1980

The John Rowe House in Jasper, Minnesota, United States, is described as a "common bungalow type (built ca. 1905) expressed in uncommon material—locally quarried Sioux quartzite." The house is listed on the National Register of Historic Places. John Rowe, a quarry man, clad the house in local Sioux quartzite after purchasing the home in 1903 for $1,000. The home has been well maintained and is a privately owned residence, not open to the public.

== See also ==
- National Register of Historic Places listings in Pipestone County, Minnesota
