= Jasper Museum =

Museum in Jasper, Minnesota, United States

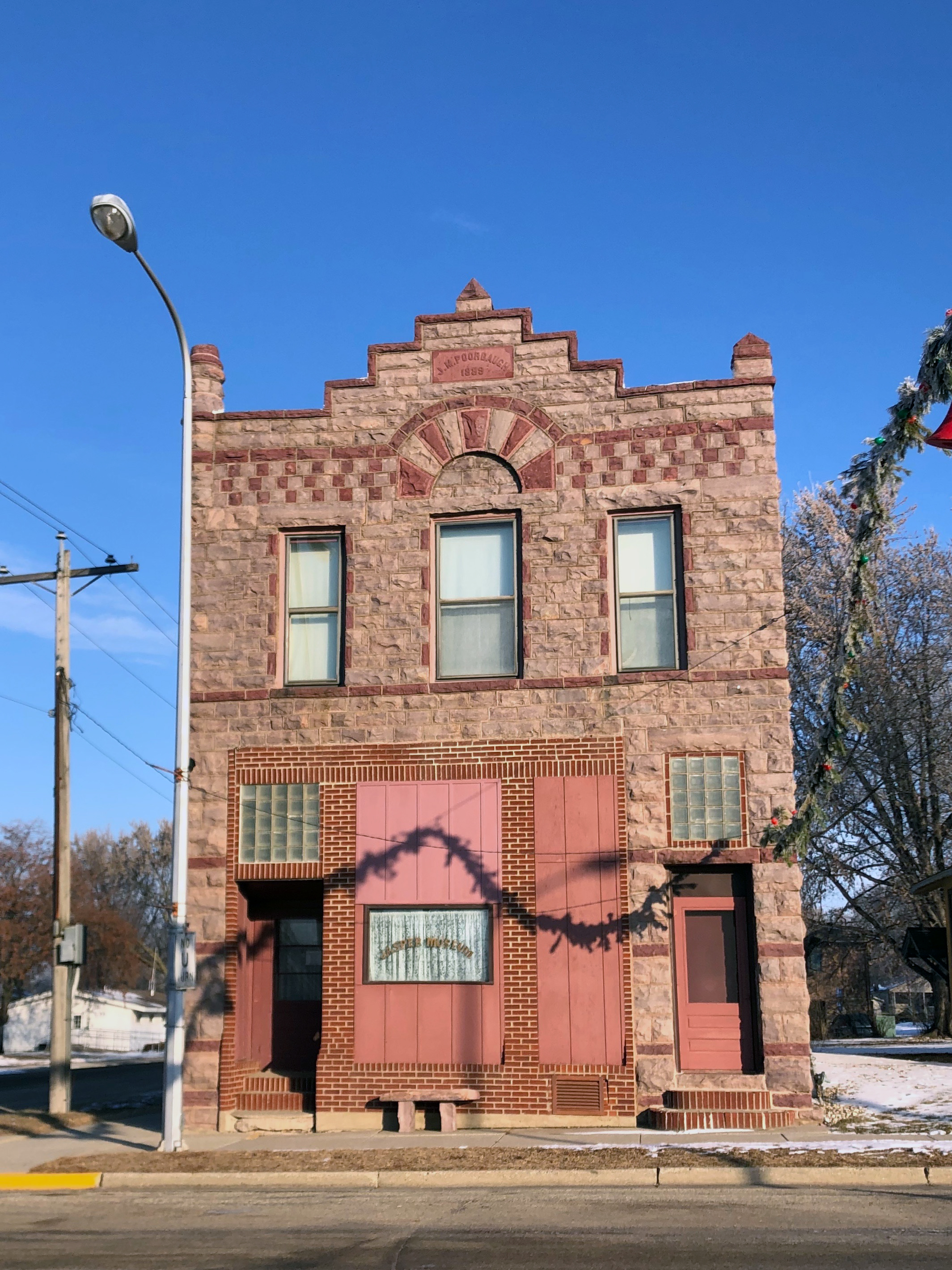
- Exterior of the museum
- Established: 1981
- Location: 102 East Wall Street Jasper, Minnesota United States
- Coordinates: 43°51′0″N 96°23′49.5″W
- Type: Local history

- John M. Poorbaugh Block
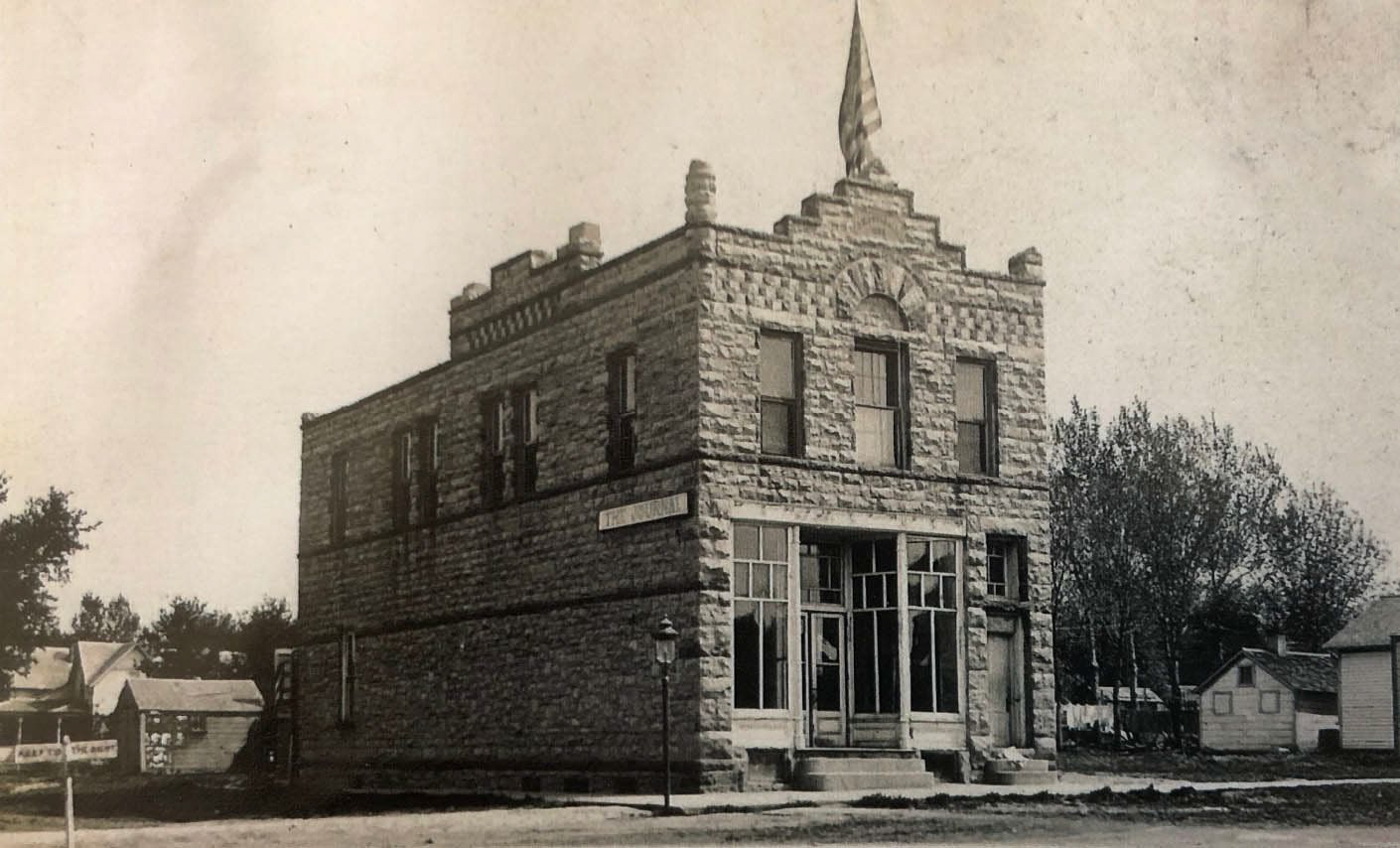

- Location within Minnesota Location within the United States
- Location: 102 East Wall Street Jasper, Minnesota, United States
- Area: Less than one acre
- Built: 1889
- Added to NRHP: January 12, 2024

The Jasper Museum is a local history museum in Jasper, Minnesota, United States. The museum is located in the John M. Poorbaugh Block, a building listed on National Register of Historic Places on January 12, 2024. The first floor was originally constructed for The Quarry Store, serving as a general merchandise business in 1889. Subsequently, the second floor was used by a local family, and later repurposed as office space. From 1917 to 1972, the building functioned as the headquarters for the local newspaper, the Jasper Journal. In 1980, the Jasper Area Historical Society (JAHS) acquired the property, establishing the museum on-site in 1981. The museum is owned and operated by the Jasper Area Historical Society.

== History ==
The Jasper Museum itself opened in 1981. The JAHS initially planned to use the C. O. Christianson House, the first house built in Jasper, as the museum. The Society acquired Bauman Hall in 1978, restoring it before transferring ownership to the city in 1981. The Christianson House proved too small over the years. The Society then purchased the Poorbaugh Building for use as a museum.

The historical society had been working towards getting the property listed on the National Register of Historic Places. The initial step involved conducting a National Register evaluation, which was made possible through a grant from the Minnesota Historical Society. Subsequently, another grant was secured in 2021 to support the efforts towards submitting a National Register nomination. The property officially earned its place on the National Register of Historic Places on January 12, 2024.

The organization has begun the process of arranging for a historic building conditions assessment. This assessment will inspect the building's materials and features, assessing their condition. The resulting assessment report will aid the historical society in prioritizing areas that require attention, including known issues such as repointing, wall bowing, and resolving water infiltration.

== Exhibits ==
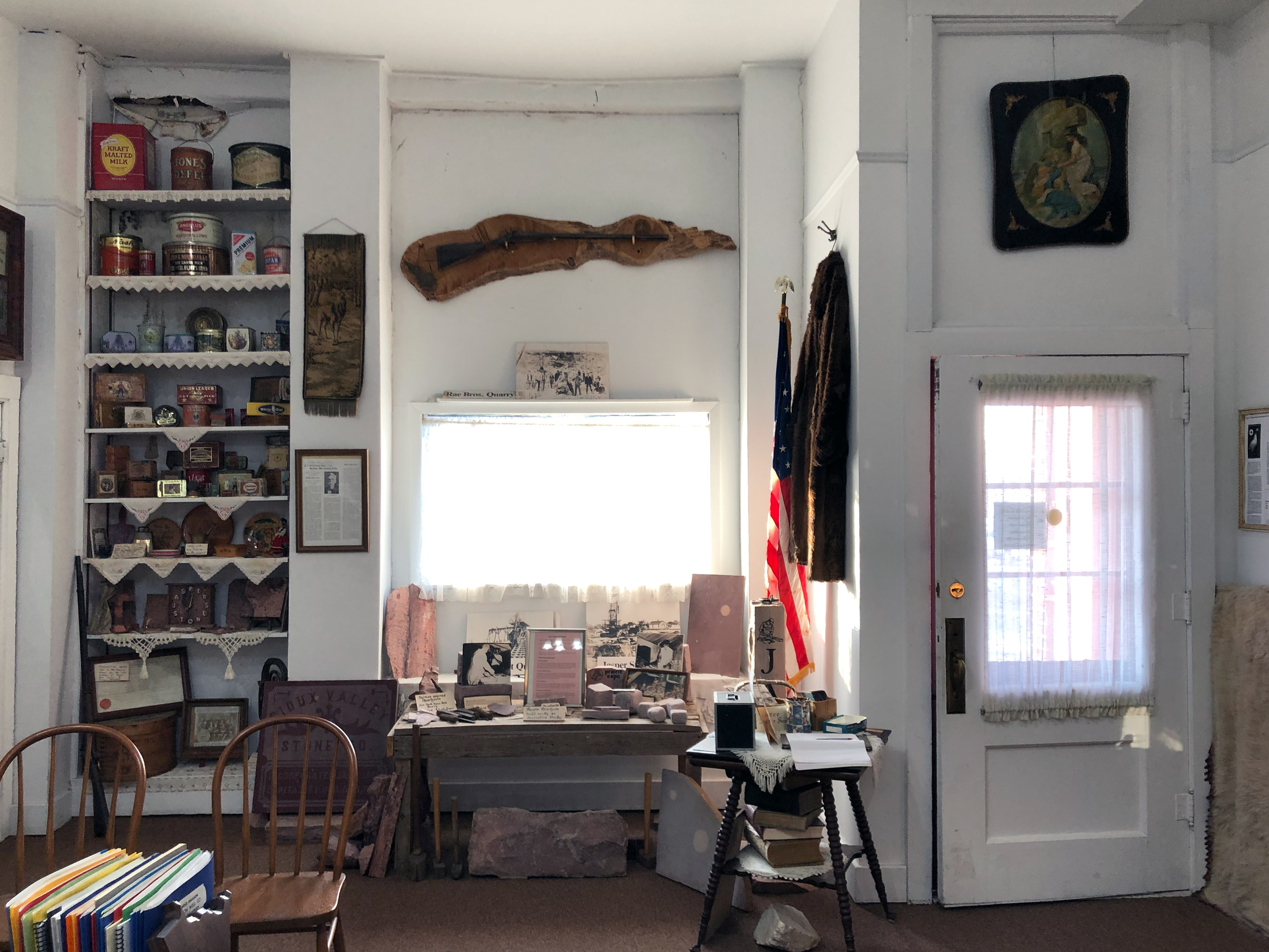
Interior of museum

Exhibits on domestic life, clothing, and household goods. Artifacts and information about the founding of Jasper, the area's role in Minnesota's history, and the lives of its residents. Displays on the history of farming in the region.

The Jasper Museum preserves the history of Jasper and the surrounding area. It offers residents and visitors a chance to learn about the people, places, and events that have shaped the community. The museum is run by volunteers and relies on community support to continue its work.

== Jasper Area Historical Society ==
The non-profit organization is dedicated to preserving and sharing the history of Jasper, Minnesota and the surrounding area. Founded in 1976, the society plays a vital role in keeping the community's past alive for future generations.

The Society's initial objective was to commemorate the bicentennial by restoring the historic C.O. Christianson House in Jasper and converting it into a museum. Despite being relocated to Moody County, South Dakota, the Society successfully brought it back to Jasper, restored it, but found it too small to serve as a museum. In 1980, they acquired the Poorbaugh building to fulfill that purpose. The volunteer based society relies on membership dues, donations, and an annual fundraiser during Quartzite Days to support its activities.

== John M. Poorbaugh Block ==
The John M. Poorbaugh Block, constructed and put into service in May 1889, stands as a significant landmark in the Jasper commercial area. It was one of the pioneering stone buildings in the locality, situated along a two-block stretch of Wall Street. Originally intended to house The Quarry Store on the ground floor, the building evolved to accommodate various uses over the years. From serving as an apartment to later functioning as an office, and eventually housing the local newspaper from 1916 to 1972, the Poorbaugh Block held a pivotal role in the community. Its unique architectural design, incorporating jasper quartzite and red pipestone, set it apart from the surrounding stone structures, showcasing an elevated sense of style and craftsmanship.

The construction of the Poorbaugh Block took place on the northeast corner of Wall Street and Sherman Avenue. Situated directly across from the E.A. Sherman block, both structures were being built simultaneously, marking the endpoints of the commercial strip on the east side. Moving east from the Poorbaugh Block, the area quickly transitions to residential properties. Construction on the building's foundation began in the fall of 1888. By February 1, 1889, the necessary stone had been delivered to the site, and by the end of March, a team of stone cutters was hard at work preparing the stone. The local newspaper described the building as being made of "gray jasper trimmed with the Pipestone red rock." George Rehm of Mason City completed the stonework, with pointing carried out by A. Palm, a recent resident of Jasper

The front facade of the building showcases intricate design elements that set the Poorbaugh Block apart from other commercial buildings in Jasper. The checkerboard pattern of red pipestone and jasper pink on the cornice, along with the archivolt and parapet trimmed in red pipestone, adds a unique character to the architecture. A red pipestone plaque proudly displays the building name and construction date - "J.M. Poorbaugh 1889". The corners of the building feature distinct pinnacles made of jasper and pipestone, adding to the overall detail of the structure.

== See also ==
- List of museums in Minnesota
- National Register of Historic Places listings in Pipestone County, Minnesota
