= Dell Rapids Water Tower =

- U.S. National Register of Historic Places
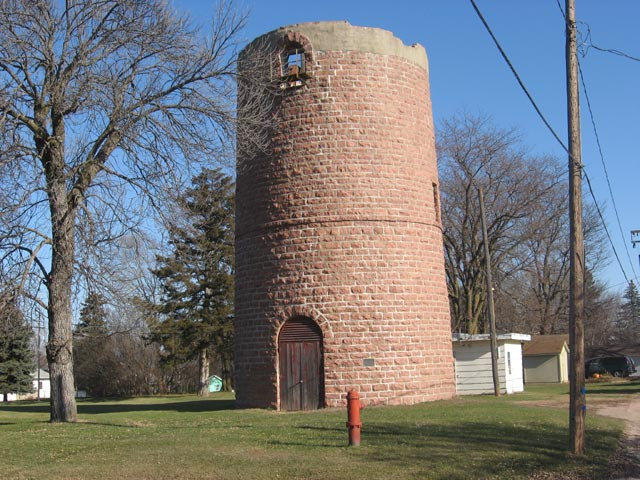

- Location within South Dakota Location within the United States
- Location: 10th and Orleans, Dell Rapids, South Dakota
- Coordinates: 43°49′47″N 96°42′32″W
- Area: less than one acre
- Built: 1894
- NRHP reference No.: 84003356
- Added to NRHP: February 23, 1984

The Dell Rapids Water Tower is a stone water tower located at 10th and Orleans Streets in Dell Rapids, South Dakota. Dell Rapids had a large fire in 1888, which burned the south side of Main Street. A few years later another fire destroyed the office of the newspaper, The Dell Rapids Times. The editor campaigned that a water system should be constructed. A water works was developed and the town's first water tower was built in 1894.

The 45-foot (14 m) water tower is built with Sioux quartzite, a type of red-pink rock found in southern South Dakota, southwest Minnesota, and northwest Iowa. The tower provided water to Dell Rapids until 1960, when the city constructed a new tower. It is the only stone water tower remaining in South Dakota.

The tower was added to the National Register of Historic Places on February 23, 1984.
