= Pipestone Indian Training School =

Former Native American school in Minnesota

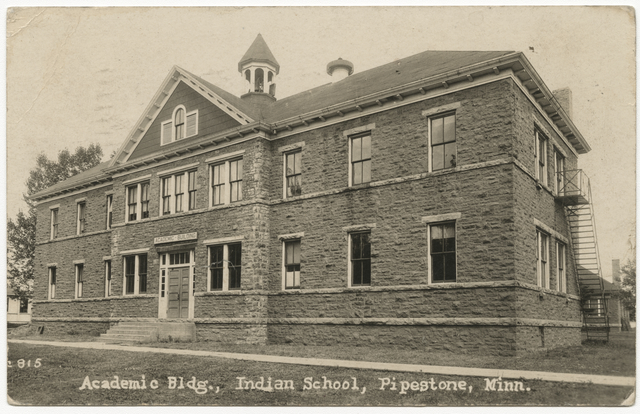
- The academic building of Pipestone Indian Training School, ca. 1907

Location
- Pipestone, Minnesota; United States; 44°1′14″N 96°19′10″W

Information
- School type: Native American boarding school
- Founded: 1894
- Status: Closed
- Closed: 1953

The Pipestone Indian Training School (PITS, also called the Pipestone Indian School) was a Native American boarding school in Pipestone, Minnesota that was established in 1894, and closed in 1953. The school was operated by the Bureau of Indian Affairs, as one of its 18 non-reservation boarding schools and last of such to be closed. The site of the school is adjacent to Pipestone National Monument, and is now used by the national monument and Minnesota West Community and Technical College. The superintendent's house of the old boarding school is on the U.S. National Register of Historic Places.

== 19th century: establishment ==
The Pipestone Indian School was built on land taken from the Yankton reservation at the Pipestone Quarry. The Yankton Dakota people long contested that loss and won before the Supreme Court in 1926.

In 1894 the formation of the Pipestone Indian Training School was authorized on the uninhabited Yankton Pipestone reservation. At that time the majority of Native Americans in Minnesota were Ojibwa, and they dominated the school's enrollment throughout its history. The school had grades 1–8 with a split curriculum, mornings and afternoon groups switching: academics and occupation skills. The school fielded both girls and boys sports teams Post WWI, the Pipestone student body became more diverse, but White Earth remained the primary source of students until the school closed. Attendance was voluntary and students needed to apply for admission. The School superintendent made recruiting visits to the various reservations, besides Minnesota's, to gain or maintain student enrollment. The last year the school was open over 300 students wanted to attend, however due to budget reductions just 130 from Minnesota were accepted. Post WWII newspapers portray the school as also being an orphanage in its last years of operation. Leaders of the Chippewa were against closing Pipestone School until something could be done to place the kids in permanent situations.

In 1895, the Superintendents of the Indian schools at Pipestone and Pierre S.D. both went to White Earth looking to enroll students. Pipestone got 8 or 9.

In 1897, The Saint Paul Globe' reported 67 Ojibwa from the Detroit Lakes were en route to the Pipestone school.

== Early 20th century ==
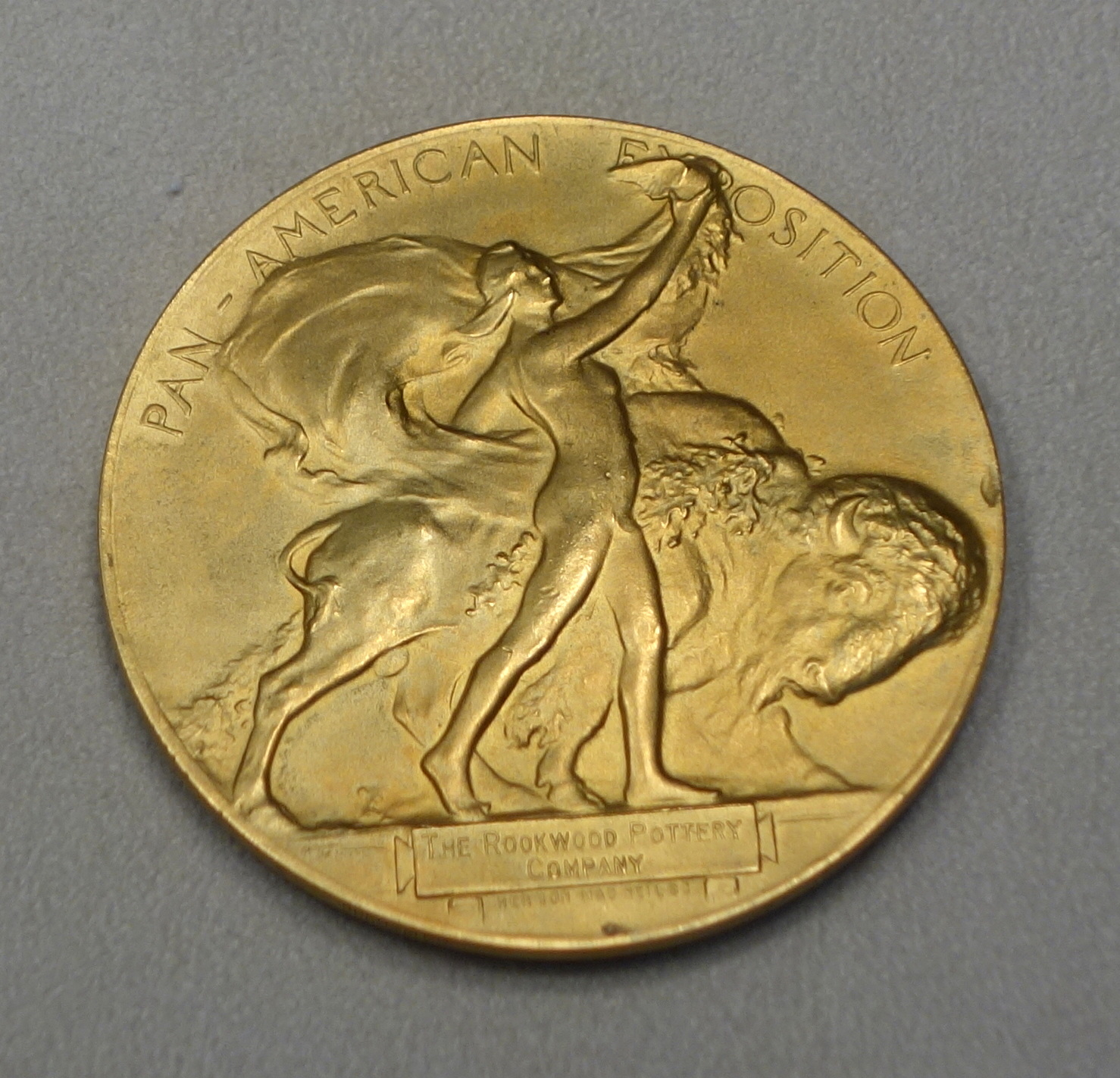
Obverse: 1901 Bronze Award, Pan-American Exposition, Buffalo, New York. The Pipestone Chippewa students received 12 Certificates of Award for these medals.

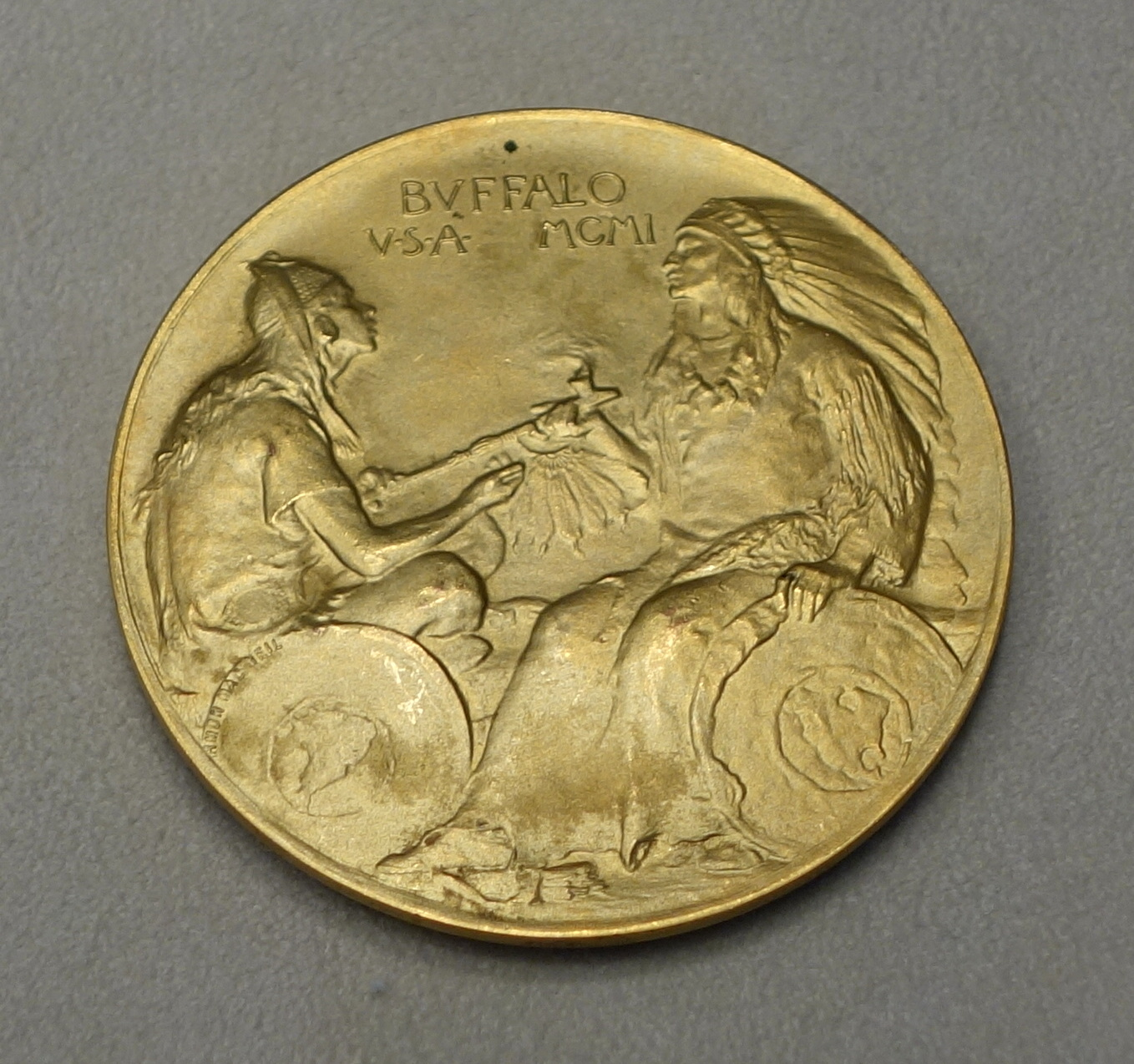
Reverse: Bronze Award, 1901 Pan-American Exposition. The medals depicted Native Americans with a pipestone pipe, South America left, North America right.

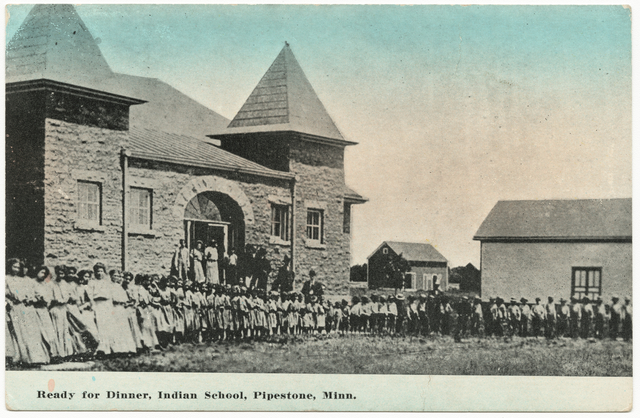
Ready for dinner, Indian Boarding School, Pipestone, MN. ca, 1910

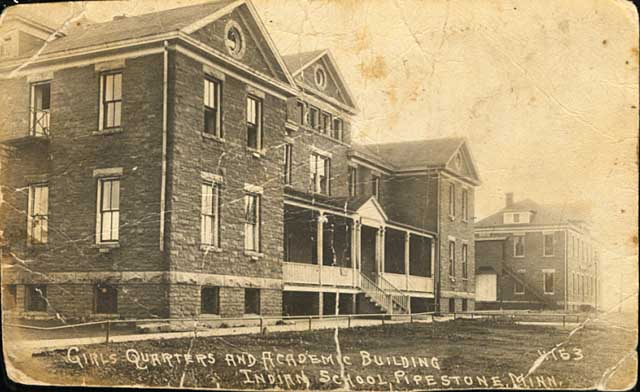
Girls' quarters and academic building, Indian Boarding School, Pipestone, MN. ca. 1905

1901 Pipestone's Chippewa students won 12 "individual' bronze medals in Agricultural Products at the Pan-American Exposition in Buffalo, New York. Winners of awards had to pay for the manufacture of their medal. The exhibition executive committee issued Certificates of Award that were needed to order the medal won.

1902 School enrollment reported at 135 mostly Chippewa.

1905 The White Earth Tomahawk newspaper was cited for reporting the Pipestone School matron, Miss Roy, returned for the new school year accompanied by many White Earth students.

1905 White Earth Chief William Madison worked as the Boys Advisor at Pipestone.

In 1906, the first three students graduated from Pipestone: were Clem Fairbanks, Willie Coffey, and Willie McIntosh from White Earth. In 1906 enrollment was 215.

In 1912, the students began publishing a school newspaper.

1914 Two girls displaying a large example of Ojibwa beadwork at Pipestone.

1914 The boys made the Tri-state Indian school championship.

1916 The BIA allocated Indian schools $167/student while PITS was spending $224/student.

1918 School enrollment reported at 165: Chippewa 75, Sioux 55, Winnebago 19, Omaha 19. During commencement PITS displayed a service banner with 35 stars for former students in uniform for WWI.

1927 school enrollment was 340 the school's maximum, many applications were turned down

1930 school enrollment was 315. In 1932, Pipestone had its largest enrollment of 375. The football team went 7–3 scoring 220 pts vs. their opponents 72. It was notable as almost all their opponents were High schools and Pipestone only went to the 9th grade. The team represented 11 tribes: Chippewa 5, Sioux 5, Gros Ventre 2, Arikara 2, Sac-Fox 2, Winnebago 1, Omaha, 1, Oneida 1, and Cheyenne The hardest fought contest was against the team from the Flandreau Indian School.

1940 Applications for enrollment far exceeded school capacity with many turned down to get to the desired h8 number of 320.

In 1941, the boys' basketball team reported that they had won a tournament two years running and were returning. They were noted for defeating the opposition routinely by 15–25 points. Because of this they had to travel over 100 miles to play teams they would or could compete with them.

== Mid-20th century and closure ==
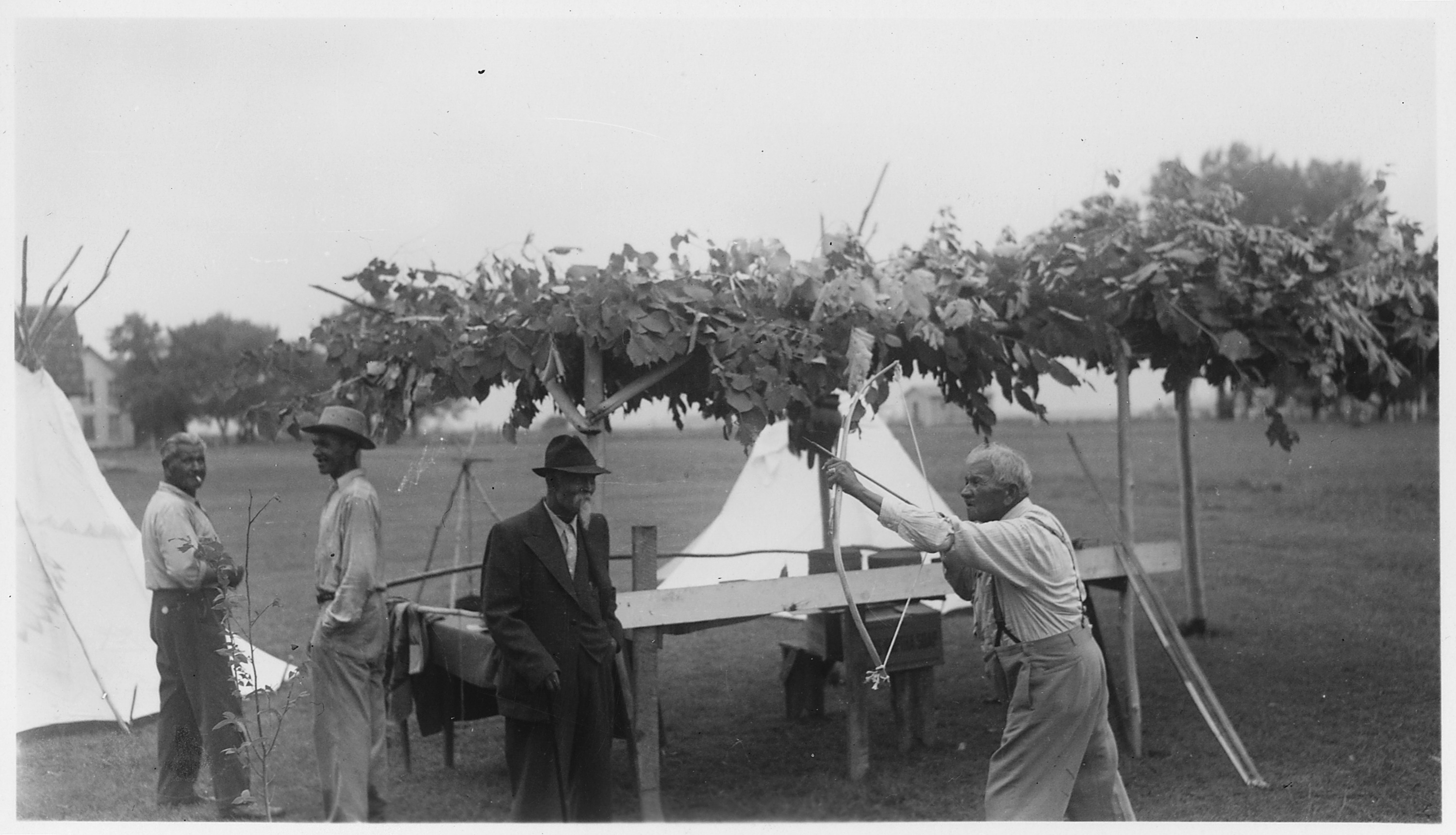
A Dakota elder, Waukon-you-you (George Crooks Sr.), demonstrates a bow and arrow at the school in 1940

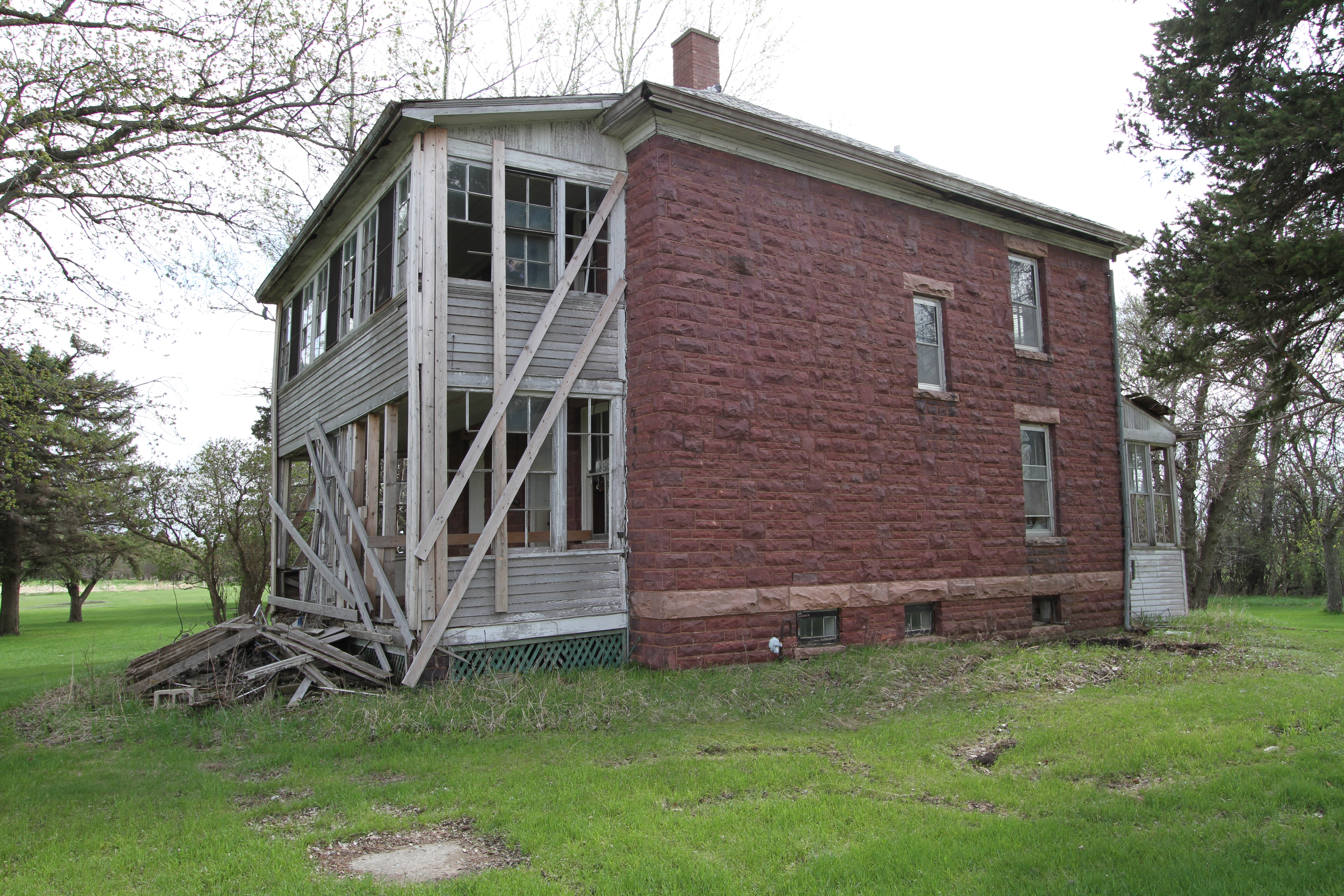
The former superintendent's house in 2018

1948: the BIA proposed closing all Indian schools. The people of Pipestone said all the other schools could close except Pipestone. Because of the historical significance of the adjoining reservation, it should be exempted.

1948: The Minnesota Welfare Board insisted that the Pipestone Indian School reopen. The governor of Minnesota wrote numerous letters that "many of these children have no homes, family's, or places to go".

1949: The school had nearly 400 applications but only 125 were accepted due to reduced funding. Most of those were year round residents. They did not have homes to return to during summer because they were orphans.

1949: Both the Minnesota Senate and House of Representatives sent letters to the President and Congress to provide for continual operation of the Pipestone school and the reopening of the School Hospital for Native Americans.

1949: The office of Minnesota U.S. Senator Hubert H. Humphrey sent letters on behalf of the PITS remaining open.

1951: Pipestone Boys advisor was Roy Buffalo

In 1952 $135,000 was authorized to fund Pipestone's last year of operations. That figure equals $1,582,819.32 in 2024 dollars or $12,662/student for 125 students. Last day was 1 July 1953.
