= Pipestone Indian School Superintendent's House =

Historic house in Minnesota, United States

- U.S. National Register of Historic Places
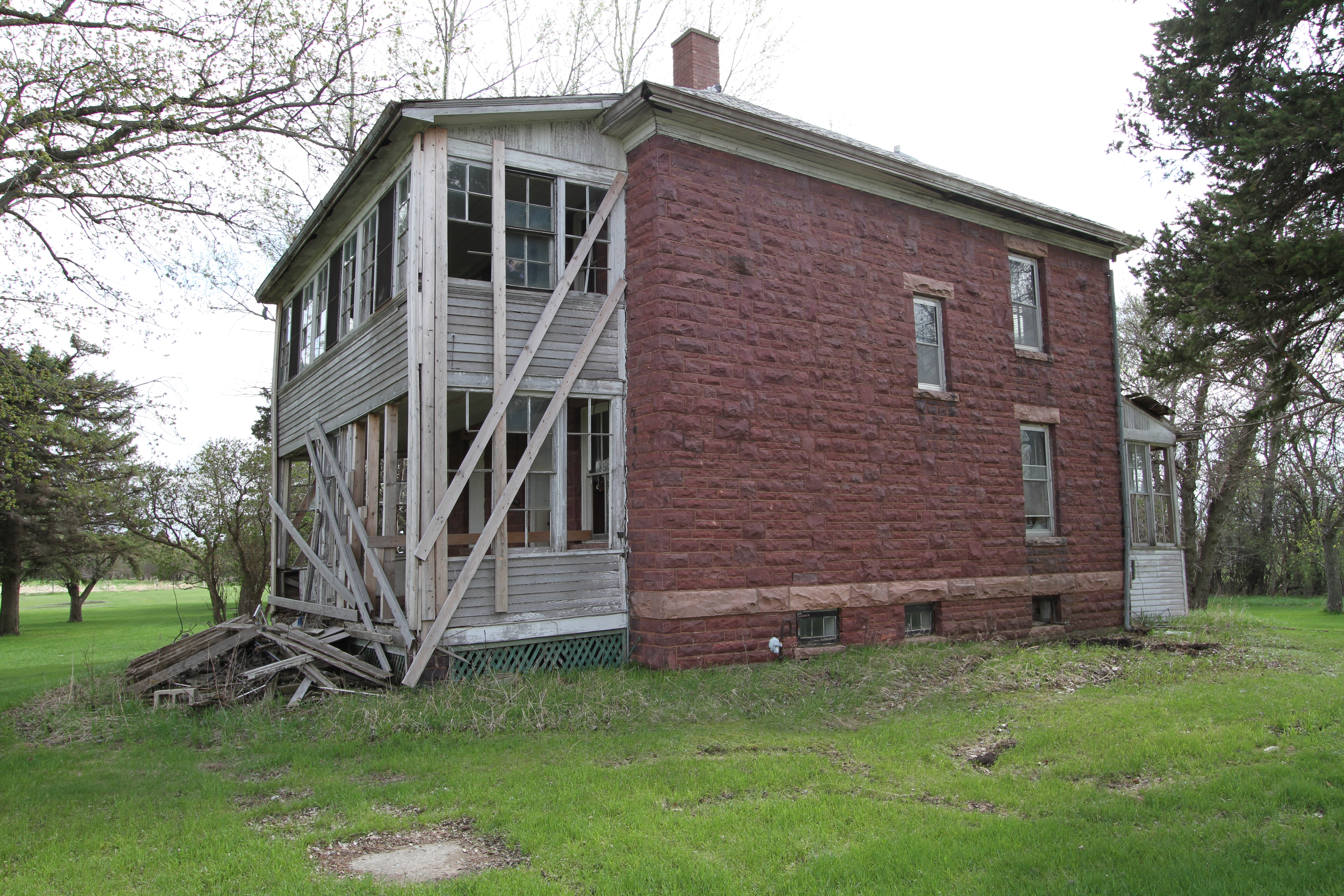
- House in May 2018

- Location within Minnesota Location within the United States
- Location: Off N. Hiawatha Ave., Pipestone, Minnesota
- Coordinates: 44°1′14″N 96°19′10″W
- Area: less than one acre
- Built: 1907
- Architect: Hafsos, R.K.
- NRHP reference No.: 93000232
- Added to NRHP: April 05, 1993

The Pipestone Indian School Superintendent's House served as the home of the superintendent of the Pipestone Indian School from its construction in 1907 to the closure of the school in 1953. It then served as a private residence until 1983, and is now used for storage by the present owner, Minnesota West Community and Technical College.

In 2006 the property was added to the 10 Most Endangered Historic Places list of the Preservation Alliance of Minnesota as it was considered to be in immediate need of stabilization.

The superintendent's house is the last of what was once a boarding school campus of more than 60 buildings, and one of only 11 built of red quartzite. The Indian school was built under the auspices of the Dawes Severalty Act of 1887, which sought to assimilate Native Americans into mainstream American culture. Education was recognized by the federal government as a way to increase control over them while at the same time separating them from their cultural ties. Children from many parts of the Midwestern United States and from tribes including the Dakota, Oneida, Pottawatomie, Arikaree, Sac and Fox were brought to the school, often with strong objections from their parents. With changing government policies the school declined and was closed in 1953.
