= Brainerd Water Tower =

- U.S. National Register of Historic Places
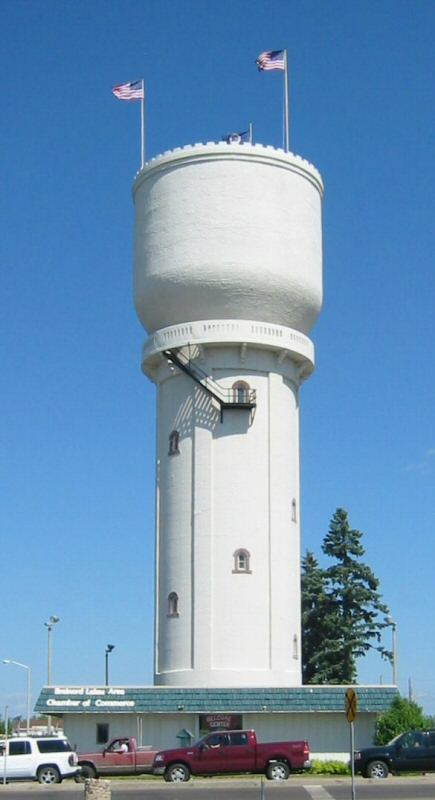

- Location within Minnesota Location within the United States
- Location: Brainerd, Minnesota
- Coordinates: 46°21′29.99″N 94°11′59.03″W
- Built: 1918
- Architect: L. P. Wolff
- NRHP reference No.: 74001014
- Added to NRHP: July 17, 1974

The Brainerd Water Tower is located at Sixth and Washington in Brainerd in the U.S. state of Minnesota. Built in 1918, it was the first all-concrete elevated tank used by a municipality in the United States; even though it was replaced in 1960, it remains standing as an icon of the town. It is referred to as "Paul Bunyan's Cup" or "Paul Bunyan's Flashlight" by local residents. The similar Pipestone Water Tower, also made of concrete, located in Pipestone, Minnesota, is the only other water tower in the United States known to have been designed by the architect L.P. Wolff.
