= Pipestone Water Tower =

- U.S. National Register of Historic Places
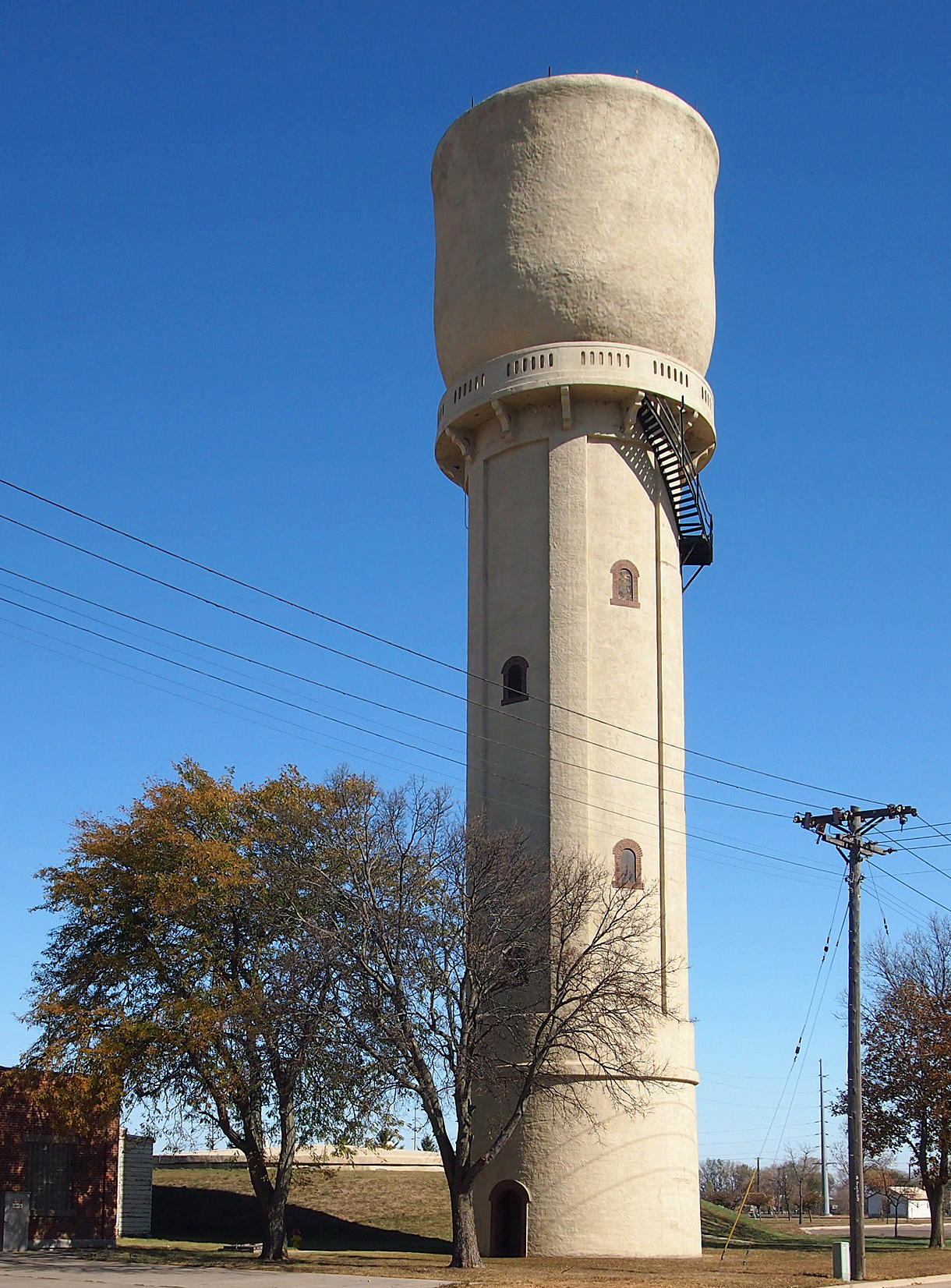

- Location within Minnesota Location within the United States
- Location: 2nd St., NE, Pipestone, Minnesota
- Coordinates: 44°0′6″N 96°18′38″W
- Area: less than one acre
- Built: 1920
- Architect: Wolff, L.P.
- Restored: 1990
- MPS: Pipestone County MRA
- NRHP reference No.: 80002123
- Added to NRHP: March 3, 1980

The Pipestone Water Tower is a 132-foot-tall (40 m) concrete water tower in Pipestone, Minnesota, United States, which is listed on the National Register of Historic Places. Unreliable rainfall and a lack of glacial lakes in the area necessitate the use of a tower to pump and store water from an underground reservoir.

== History ==
The Pipestone Water Tower is unique in that it is one of only two water towers in the United States known to have been designed by architect L.P. Wolfe; its sister, the Brainerd Water Tower, is located in Brainerd, Minnesota. It was built to replace an aged steel standpipe tower built in the late 1880s. Construction on the structure was commenced by the Campbell Construction Company in 1920 for $24,610. Water service from the tower began on October 26, 1921, and continued until it was replaced by a larger tower in 1976. A restoration of the tower was undertaken in 1990, along with the construction of a new wayside rest area.

== Structure ==
The water tower, significant in that it is constructed of poured concrete, stands at 132 feet (40 m) tall and roughly 25 feet (7.6 m) in diameter. The 150,000-US-gallon (570,000 L) capacity tank is supported by a hollow supporting column which contains an unusual set of spiral windows and an internal staircase. The tower pumped and stored water from a 500,000-US-gallon (1,900,000 L) reservoir built below it at the time of its construction, releasing the water via gravity on demand.

== Present day ==
The tower has become the center of the Water Tower Festival, a community celebration held in late June.
