= Jasper, Minnesota =

City in Minnesota, United States

Jasper
- City
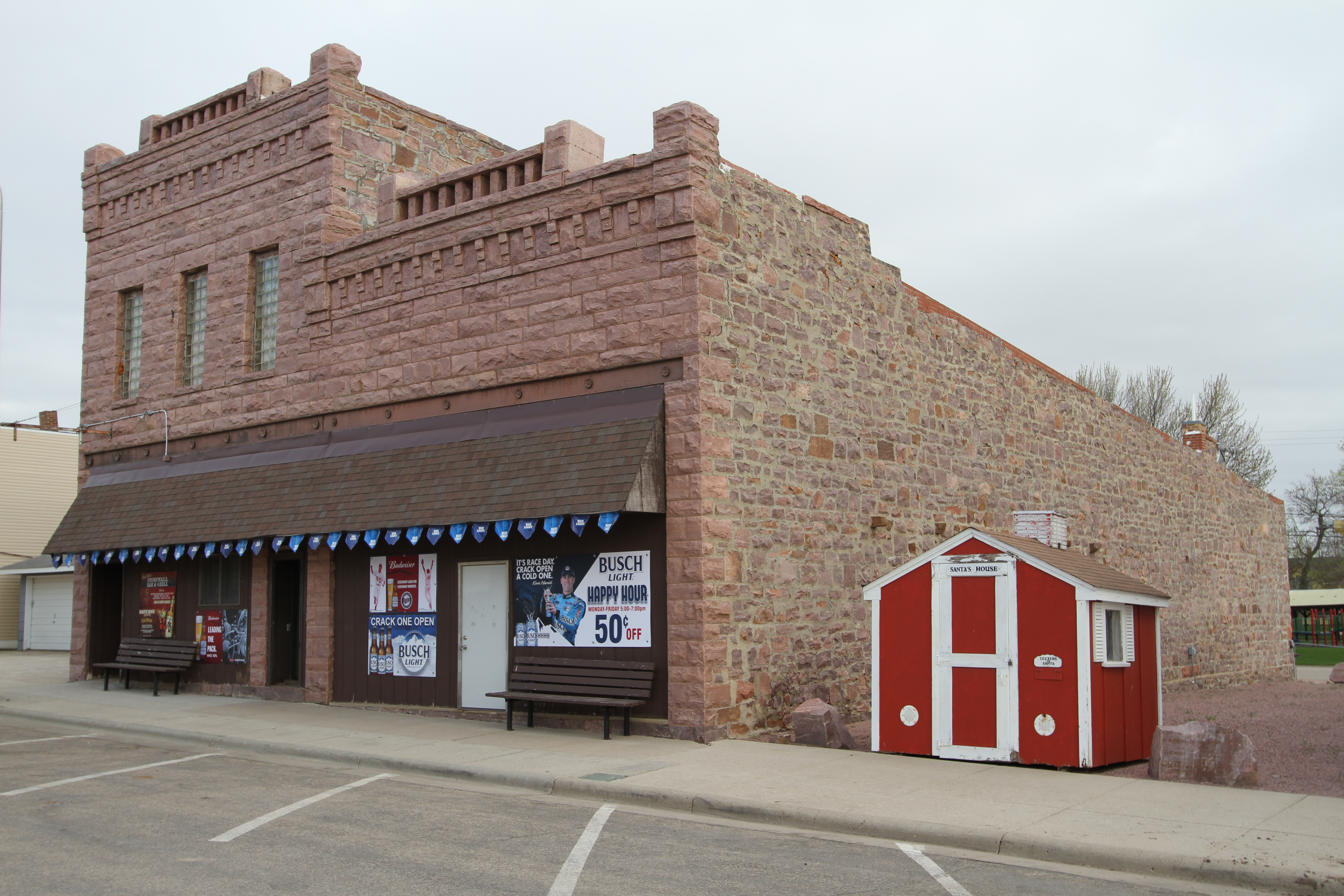
- Businesses on West Wall Street

- Location of Jasper, Minnesota
- Coordinates: 43°50′57″N 96°24′00″W
- Country: United States
- State: Minnesota
- Counties: Pipestone, Rock

Government
  - Type: Mayor – Council
  - Mayor: Mike Baustian

Area
  - Total: 1.02 sq mi (2.65 km^{2})
  - Land: 1.02 sq mi (2.64 km^{2})
  - Water: 0.0039 sq mi (0.01 km^{2})
- Elevation: 1,545 ft (471 m)

Population (2020)
  - Total: 610
  - Density: 599/sq mi (231.1/km^{2})
- Time zone: UTC-6 (Central (CST))
  - Summer (DST): UTC-5 (CDT)
- ZIP code: 56144
- Area code: 507
- FIPS code: 27-31760
- GNIS feature ID: 0645586

Jasper is a city in Pipestone and Rock counties in the State of Minnesota. As of the 2020 census, Jasper had a population of 610. Most of the city lies in Pipestone County, with only a small part of the city extending into Rock County.

== History ==
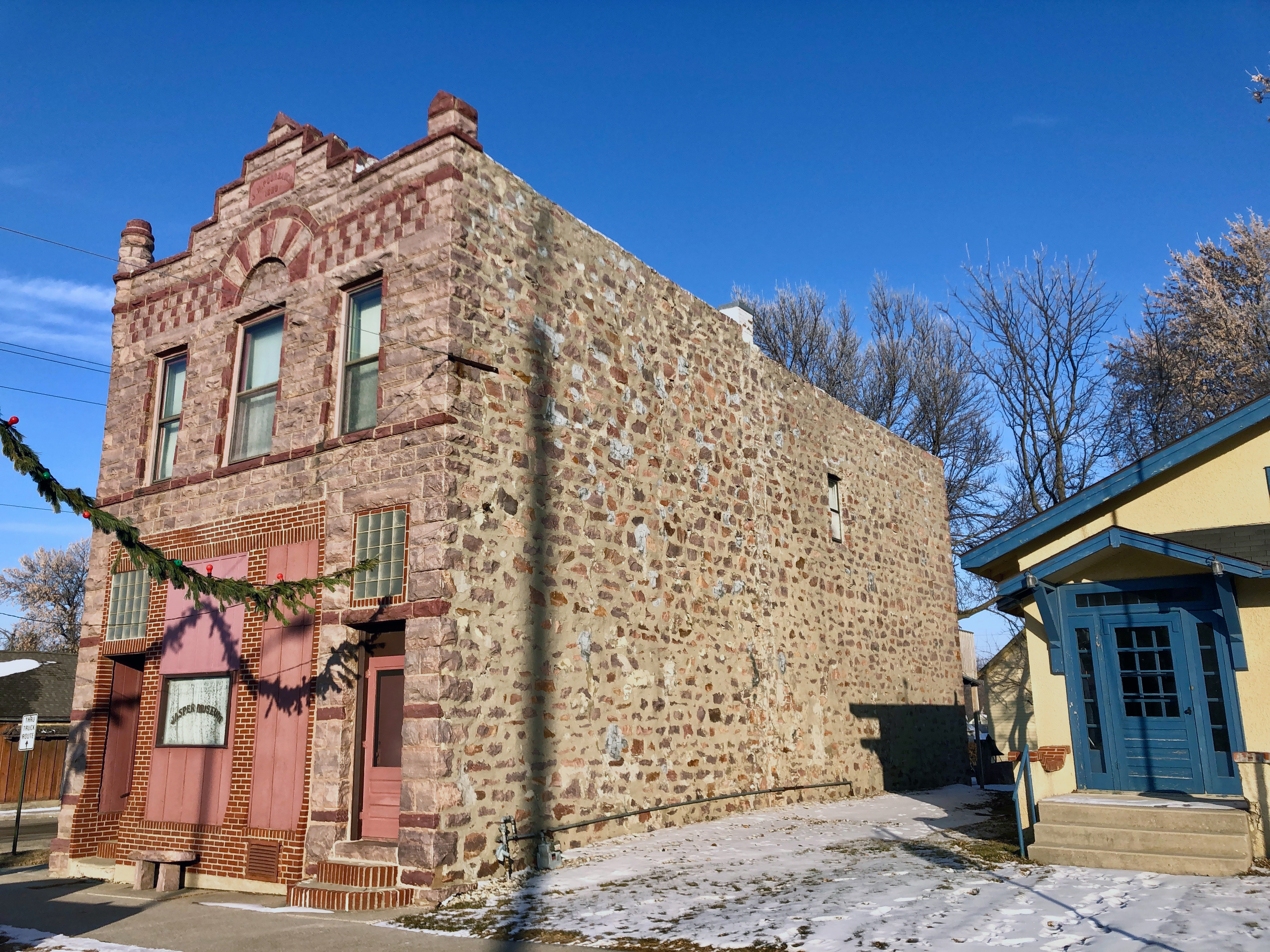
John M. Poorbaugh Block, now the Jasper Museum

Jasper was platted in 1888. The city was named for deposits of jasper mined nearby. A post office has been in operation at Jasper since 1888. Jasper was incorporated in 1889.

On July 8, 1927 a tornado near the town was photographed by Lucille Handberg. Her photograph has become a classic image, even appearing on three album covers: Bitches Brew by American jazz musician Miles Davis (1970), as well as English bands Deep Purple (1974) and Siouxsie and the Banshees (1986).

== Geography ==
According to the United States Census Bureau, the city has a total area of 0.88 square miles (2.28 km^{2}), all land.

Minnesota State Highways 23 and 269 are two of the main routes in the community.

== Demographics ==
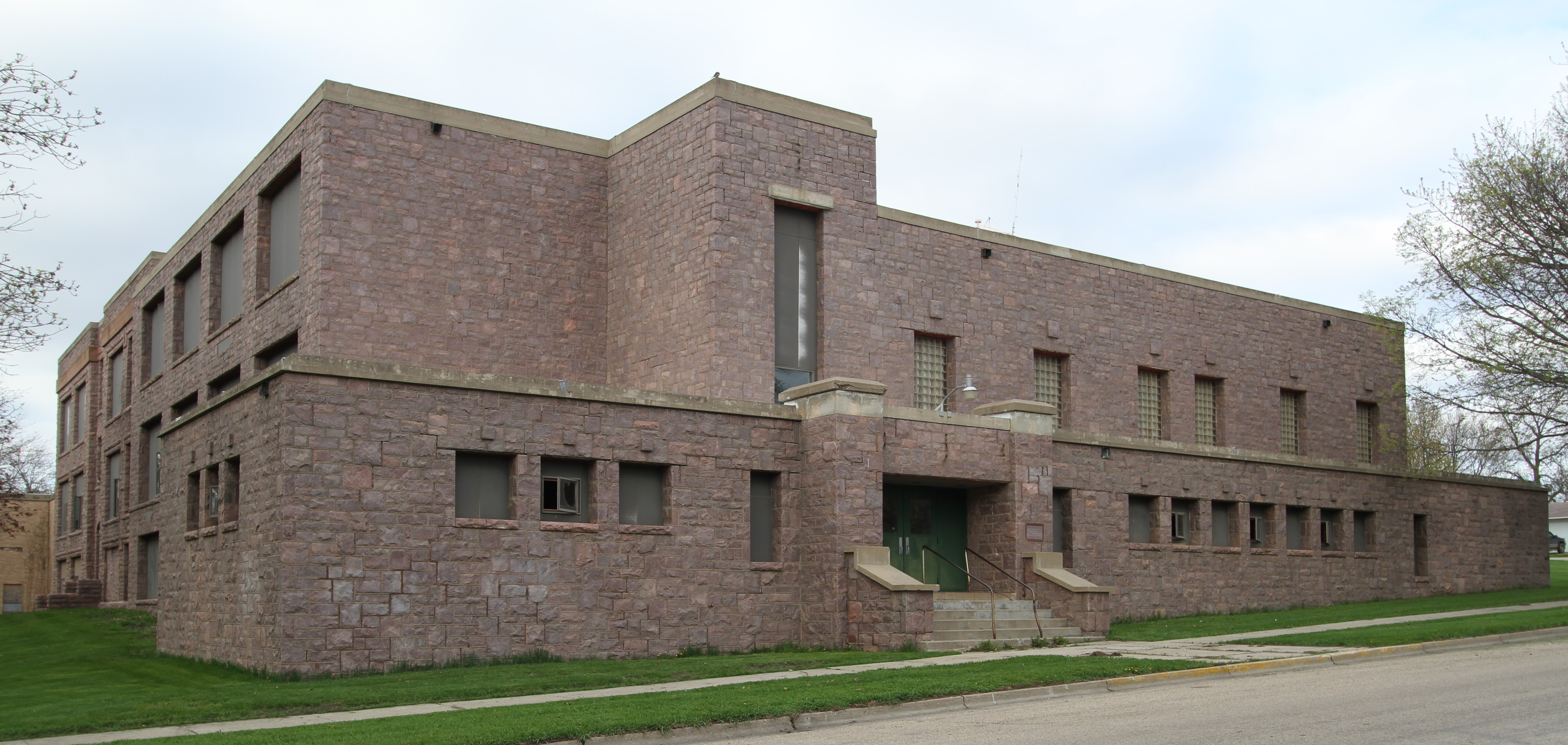
Public school building

Historical population
Census	Pop.	Note	%±
1890	372		—
1900	559		50.3%
1910	704		25.9%
1920	968		37.5%
1930	769		−20.6%
1940	880		14.4%
1950	840		−4.5%
1960	850		1.2%
1970	754		−11.3%
1980	731		−3.1%
1990	599		−18.1%
2000	597		−0.3%
2010	633		6.0%
2020	610		−3.6%
U.S. Decennial Census

Racial/ethnic demographics of Jasper, MN in 2010 and 2020
Race/ethnicity	Pop 2010	Pop 2020	% 2010	% 2020
White alone (NH)	576	502	91.00%	82.30%
Black or African American alone (NH)	9	3	1.42%	0.49%
Native American or Alaska Native alone (NH)	3	11	0.47%	1.80%
Asian alone (NH)	0	2	0.00%	0.33%
Native Hawaiian and Pacific Islander alone (NH)	0	0	0.00%	0.00%
Some other race alone (NH)	0	5	0.00%	0.82%
Two or more races (NH)	13	27	2.05%	4.43%
Hispanic or Latino (any race)	32	60	5.06%	9.84%
Total	633	610	100.00%	100.00%

=== 2010 census ===
As of the census of 2010, there were 633 people, 292 households, and 166 families living in the city. The population density was 719.3 inhabitants per square mile (277.7/km^{2}). There were 324 housing units at an average density of 368.2 per square mile (142.2/km^{2}). The racial makeup of the city was 92.3% White, 1.4% African American, 0.5% Native American, 3.0% from other races, and 2.8% from two or more races. Hispanic or Latino of any race were 5.1% of the population.

There were 292 households, of which 30.5% had children under the age of 18 living with them, 42.5% were married couples living together, 8.2% had a female householder with no husband present, 6.2% had a male householder with no wife present, and 43.2% were non-families. 40.4% of all households were made up of individuals, and 21.6% had someone living alone who was 65 years of age or older. The average household size was 2.17 and the average family size was 2.87.

The median age in the city was 40.5 years. 25.8% of residents were under the age of 18; 6.7% were between the ages of 18 and 24; 23.5% were from 25 to 44; 21.5% were from 45 to 64; and 22.4% were 65 years of age or older. The gender makeup of the city was 49.0% male and 51.0% female.

=== 2000 census ===
As of the census of 2000, there were 597 people, 286 households, and 173 families living in the city. The population density was 678.2 inhabitants per square mile (261.9/km^{2}). There were 308 housing units at an average density of 349.9 per square mile (135.1/km^{2}). The racial makeup of the city was 97.15% White, 0.67% African American, 0.84% Native American, 0.17% Asian, and 1.17% from two or more races. Hispanic or Latino of any race were 0.84% of the population.

There were 286 households, out of which 24.8% had children under the age of 18 living with them, 51.7% were married couples living together, 5.6% had a female householder with no husband present, and 39.5% were non-families. 39.2% of all households were made up of individuals, and 26.6% had someone living alone who was 65 years of age or older. The average household size was 2.09 and the average family size was 2.75.

In the city, the population was spread out, with 23.6% under the age of 18, 4.4% from 18 to 24, 22.4% from 25 to 44, 22.1% from 45 to 64, and 27.5% who were 65 years of age or older. The median age was 44 years. For every 100 females, there were 83.1 males. For every 100 females age 18 and over, there were 81.7 males.

The median income for a household in the city was $25,521, and the median income for a family was $34,500. Males had a median income of $26,818 versus $23,542 for females. The per capita income for the city was $18,019. About 6.1% of families and 9.7% of the population were below the poverty line, including 10.4% of those under age 18 and 14.3% of those age 65 or over.

== Politics ==
The portion of Jasper in Pipestone County is located in Minnesota's 7th congressional district, represented by Collin Peterson, a Democrat. The portion in Rock County is located in Minnesota's 1st congressional district, represented by Jim Hagedorn, a Republican. At the state level, all of Jasper is located in Senate District 22, represented by Republican Bill Weber, and in House District 22A, represented by Republican Joe Schomacker.
