= Monticello Hotel =

Monticello Hotel may refer to:

- Eldorado Hotel, Las Vegas, New Mexico, known briefly as the "Monticello Hotel"
- Monticello Hotel (Norfolk, Virginia), a historic hotel in Norfolk, Virginia.
- Monticello Hotel (Longview, Washington)
  - "Monticello Hotel", episode 2 of season 2 of the TV series Hotel Hell

== See also ==
- Hyland Hotel (Monticello, Utah)
