= Charles Tisdale Howard =

American attorney and politician

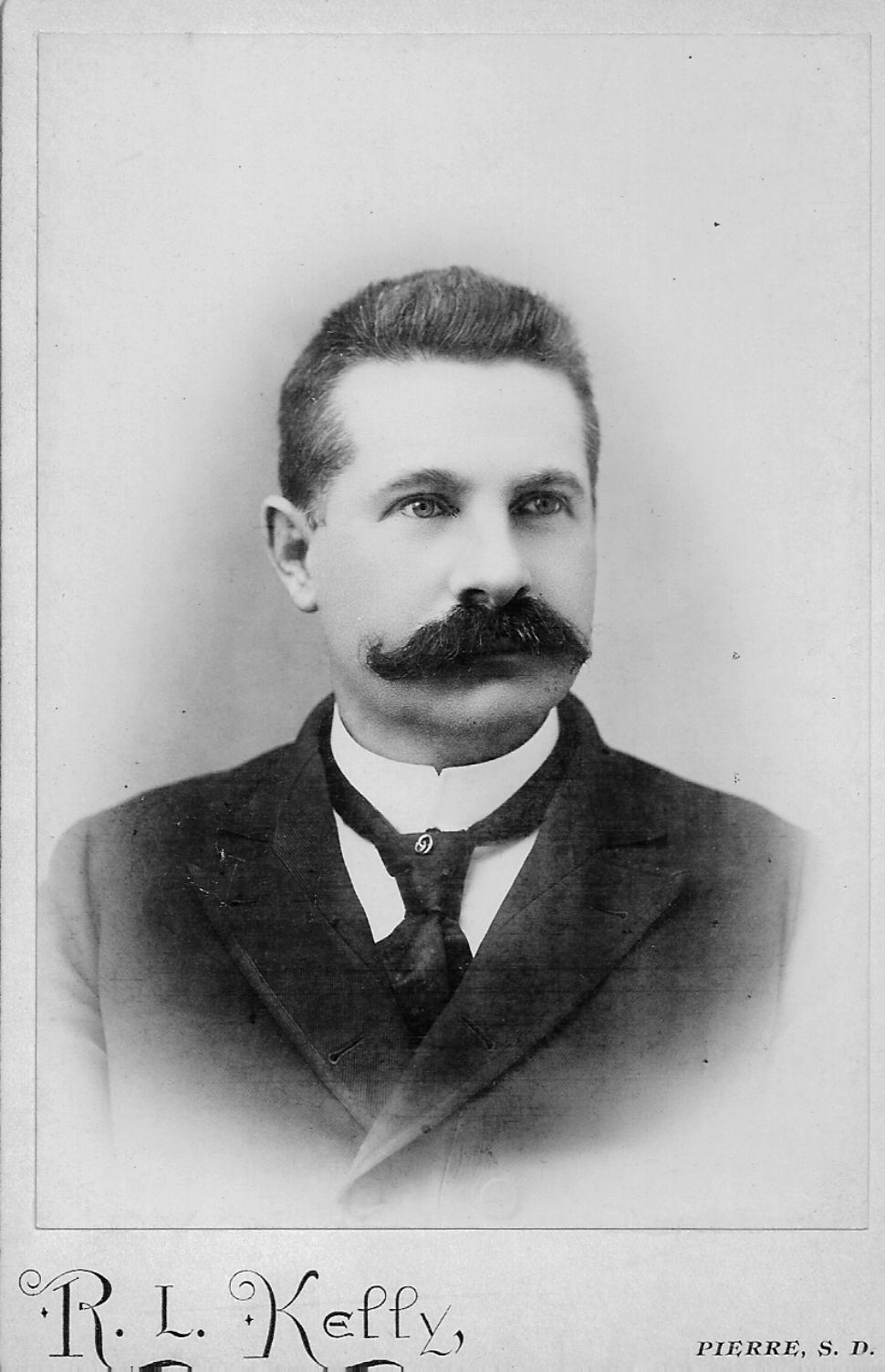

1st United States Attorney for the District of South Dakota
- In office 1889–1892
- President: Benjamin Harrison

Personal details
- Born: February 16, 1856 Eckford, Michigan, U.S.
- Died: June 23, 1936 (aged 80) Pipestone, Minnesota, U.S.
- Party: Republican
- Spouse: Eugenia Jerome Beecher
- Children: Albert, Charles, Paul and Harriet
- Education: Albion College
- Profession: Attorney

Charles Tisdale Howard (February 16, 1856 – June 23, 1936) was an attorney and Republican party politician, the first United States Attorney for the District of South Dakota, served as the fourth Speaker of the South Dakota House of Representatives, and was elected a Minnesota District Court Judge for the Fifth Judicial District in 1928.

== Early life and education ==
Howard was born in Eckford, Michigan, on February 16, 1856, and was the fourth of five children and only son born to Russell and Emeline Howard (née Morse). His father Russell Marshall Howard was a farmer and one of the first settlers of Eckford, and was one of the original old line whigs and a founding member of Michigan's Republican party.

He graduated from Albion College in Albion, Michigan, in 1880 with a Bachelor of Philosophy degree, and then joined a law firm in Marshall where he served a legal apprenticeship. He passed the Bar exam in 1882 and then moved with his family to Redfield, in the Dakota territory where he was active in Republican party politics.

== Political career ==
When South Dakota was formally granted statehood in 1889, President Benjamin Harrison appointed him United States Attorney for the District of South Dakota, a post he held until 1892. When the twenty-third president lost his 1892 bid for re-election, Howard ran for a seat in the state legislature in 1894 representing Spink County, and was elected Speaker of the House by his Republican colleagues.

Howard was installed as Grand Chancellor for the Knights of Pythias order in Aberdeen, South Dakota, in 1894.

He was elected a District Court of Minnesota Judge for the Fifth Judicial Circuit in 1928.

== Personal life ==
Charles T. Howard married Eugenia Jerome Beecher on October 19, 1892, in Redwood Falls, Minnesota. They had four children Albert Russell Howard, Charles Beecher Howard, Captain Paul Eugene Howard (USN), and Harriet Howard Gano (named after Eugenia Beecher's sister Harriet and distant cousin Harriet Beecher Stowe).

His son-in-law was the highly decorated Naval officer Vice Admiral Roy Alexander Gano, a native of Pipestone, Minnesota, who married his daughter Harriet.

Judge Howard died on June 23, 1936, at the age of 80 in Pipestone, Minnesota, where he is buried.
