= Mike Menning =

American politician

Member of the Minnesota Senate from the 26th District
- In office January 4, 1977 – January 3, 1983
- Preceded by: John Olson
- Succeeded by: Gary DeCramer

Member of the Minnesota House of Representatives from District 26A
- In office January 7, 1975 – January 3, 1977
- Preceded by: Verne Long
- Succeeded by: Bruce "Buzz" Anderson

Personal details
- Born: July 27, 1945 (age 81) Pipestone, Minnesota
- Party: Republican
- Education: Worthington Community College, Southwest Minnesota State College
- Profession: Businessman, minister, politician

Marion "Mike" Menning (born July 27, 1945) is a former politician and a former member of the Minnesota Senate and the Minnesota House of Representatives from southwestern Minnesota. He was first elected to the House as a representative of District 26A in 1974, served one term, and then ran successfully for the District 26 senate seat in 1976. He was re-elected to the Senate in 1980. Because of the 1980 redistricting, that term was two years in duration. He represented all or portions of Murray, Nobles, Pipestone and Rock counties.

== Service in the Minnesota House and Senate ==
From the town of Edgerton, Menning, a local businessman, made energy, agriculture, education and transportation his special concerns during his time in the legislature. While in the House, he served on the Agriculture, Commerce & Economic Development, and Transportation committees. In the Senate, he served on the Energy & Housing, Finance, Local Government, and Transportation committees, and on various sub-committees relevant to each area. During the 1981–83 session, he chaired the Finance Committee's sub-committee on Semi-States/DOT (Minnesota Dept. of Transportation).

Menning's brother-in-law, Gaylin Den Ouden, also served in the Minnesota Legislature from 1977 to 1987. From Prinsburg, Den Ouden represented District 21B.

== 1986 gubernatorial run ==
After his service in the legislature concluded, Menning switched political parties, leaving the Minnesota Democratic-Farmer-Labor Party in 1983 to become a member of the Republican Party of Minnesota. In 1986, he campaigned for the Republican endorsement for governor. However, the party's endorsement eventually went to fellow southwest Minnesota resident Cal Ludeman of Tracy. Menning subsequently threw his support to Ludeman, who lost the November general election to popular incumbent governor Rudy Perpich.

== Christian service and Friendship Ministries ==
In 1985, Menning co-authored the book "Us Four: A Senator, His Family, Their Brain Injured Child" along with Ruth Peterman of Minneapolis. The book documented his family's struggle to get help for their son, who was born with microcephaly. During this time, he also became active in Friendship Ministries, a Christian organization that works on behalf of children with special needs and their parents. He helped start groups or chapters of the organization in his home town of Edgerton, and also in Willmar.

Putting politics aside, Menning eventually left Minnesota, moving to Salt Lake City, Utah with his family, where he served as pastor of the Mountain Springs Community Church for five years, also continuing his work with Friendship Ministries. He also heads Global Partners, Inc., an area charitable organization.
