= Gary DeCramer =

American politician

Member of the Minnesota Senate from the 27th district
- In office January 4, 1983 – January 4, 1993
- Preceded by: Mike Menning
- Succeeded by: Arlene Lesewski

Personal details
- Born: Gary Michael DeCramer; September 13, 1944 Marshall, Minnesota
- Died: March 7, 2012 (aged 67) Morris, Minnesota
- Party: Democratic-Farmer-Labor Party
- Spouse: Estelle
- Children: 3
- Education: University of Saint Thomas, University of Oklahoma
- Occupation: Educator

Gary Michael DeCramer (September 13, 1944 – March 7, 2012) was a politician from Minnesota and a Minnesota State Senator. After running unsuccessfully for the state senate in a 1981 special election, he was elected from Ghent in 1982 in the re-districted District 27, and was re-elected in 1986 and 1990. The district included all or portions of Lincoln, Lyon, Murray, Nobles, Pipestone and Rock counties.

DeCramer died after collapsing on a trip to Morris, Minnesota on Wednesday, March 7, 2012.

== Early years and service as senator ==
DeCramer was born and raised on a farm near Marshall. He attended Crosier Preparatory Seminary in Onamia and graduated from the Secondary College of St. Thomas in Saint Paul with a B.A. in English. He later earned a master's degree in English from the University of Oklahoma.

During his time as senator, DeCramer's special legislative concerns included agriculture, education and soil, water and wildlife conservation. He was a member of the senate's Agriculture and Rural Development, Education, Finance, Governmental Operations, Public Utilities and State Regulated Industries, Redistricting, Rules & Administration, Transportation and Veterans & General Legislation committees, and of various sub-committees relevant to each area. He was chair of the Senate Transportation Committee during the 1991-1992 legislative session.

== Leadership in public affairs and education ==
After leaving the Minnesota Legislature, DeCramer was the Minnesota Director of USDA Rural Development, which provides financial and technical assistance to the towns and eleven tribal communities in the state, and direct financing toward low-income housing, community facilities, rural water and wastewater infrastructure, distance learning and telemedicine infrastructure, rural business and cooperative services, and community development. He later served as a principal planning analyst for Hennepin County's Office of Planning and Development, and as senior fellow in the Hubert H. Humphrey School of Public Affairs' State and Local Policy Program and the University of Minnesota's Center for Transportation Studies. He also served briefly as interim president of Southwest State University in Marshall. During this period, he earned a doctorate in educational leadership from the University of St. Thomas.

DeCramer served as the director of the Humphrey School's mid-career Master of Public Affairs program. He taught in that program and in the University of Minnesota's leadership minor. He was chair of the board for DARTS, a nonprofit serving seniors and families in Dakota County, and also served on the board for Project Harvest Hope, a national nonprofit dedicated to values-based community, economic and agricultural development in the villages of the Transylvanian region of Romania.
