= Pipestone, Minnesota =

City in Minnesota, United States

Pipestone
- City
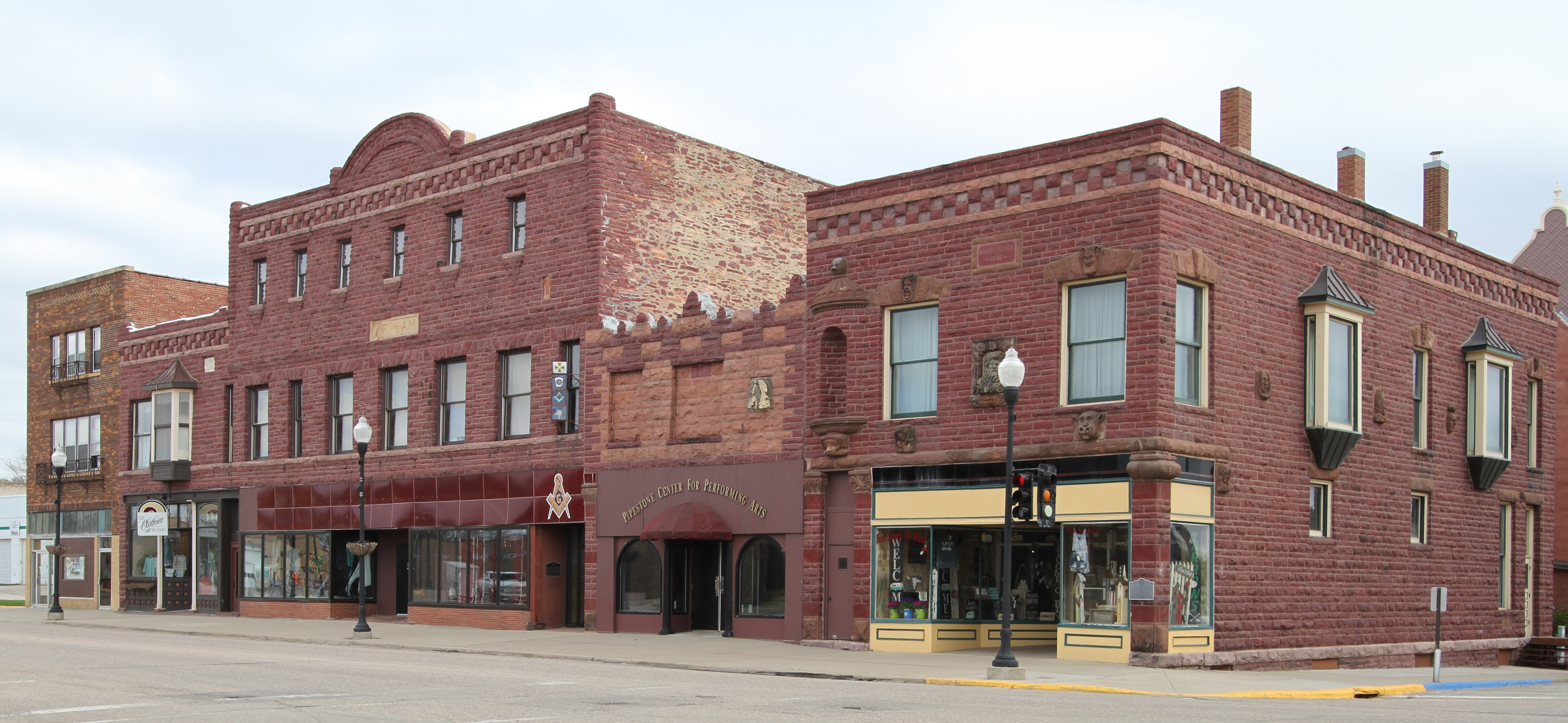
- Downtown Pipestone
- Motto: "Home of the Red Stone Pipe"
- Location of the city of Pipestone within Pipestone County, Minnesota
- Coordinates: 43°59′52″N 96°19′02″W
- Country: United States
- State: Minnesota
- County: Pipestone

Government
  - Type: Mayor – Council
  - Mayor: Dan Delaney

Area
  - Total: 4.15 sq mi (10.75 km^{2})
  - Land: 4.15 sq mi (10.74 km^{2})
  - Water: 0.0039 sq mi (0.01 km^{2})
- Elevation: 1,739 ft (530 m)

Population (2020)
  - Total: 4,215
  - Estimate (2021): 4,160
  - Density: 1,016.7/sq mi (392.55/km^{2})
- Time zone: UTC-6 (CST)
  - Summer (DST): UTC-5 (CDT)
- ZIP code: 56164
- Area code: 507
- FIPS code: 27-51388
- GNIS feature ID: 2396214
- Website: pipestoneminnesota.com

Pipestone is a city in and the county seat of Pipestone County, Minnesota. The population was 4,215 at the 2020 census. The city is also the site of the Pipestone National Monument.

== History ==
Pipestone was platted in October, 1876, incorporated as a village on February 10, 1881, and as a city on July 23, 1901. Pipestone took its name from Pipestone County.

== Geography ==
According to the United States Census Bureau, the city has a total area of 4.18 square miles (10.83 km^{2}), all land.

=== Climate ===
The town has a humid continental climate similar to the rest of the state; though near the southern border, Pipestone is on measurably higher ground than many areas to the north and east.

Climate data for Pipestone, Minnesota (1991−2020 normals, extremes 1877−present)
Month	Jan	Feb	Mar	Apr	May	Jun	Jul	Aug	Sep	Oct	Nov	Dec	Year
Record high °F (°C)	64 (18)	67 (19)	85 (29)	93 (34)	108 (42)	106 (41)	108 (42)	108 (42)	103 (39)	92 (33)	82 (28)	62 (17)	108 (42)
Mean maximum °F (°C)	42.3 (5.7)	48.9 (9.4)	66.0 (18.9)	79.9 (26.6)	88.0 (31.1)	92.6 (33.7)	92.8 (33.8)	91.9 (33.3)	88.4 (31.3)	82.0 (27.8)	64.0 (17.8)	46.5 (8.1)	95.5 (35.3)
Mean daily maximum °F (°C)	22.4 (−5.3)	27.2 (−2.7)	39.9 (4.4)	55.0 (12.8)	68.0 (20.0)	78.1 (25.6)	82.4 (28.0)	80.2 (26.8)	73.2 (22.9)	58.7 (14.8)	41.6 (5.3)	27.9 (−2.3)	54.6 (12.6)
Daily mean °F (°C)	13.6 (−10.2)	18.0 (−7.8)	30.6 (−0.8)	44.4 (6.9)	57.3 (14.1)	67.8 (19.9)	71.8 (22.1)	69.5 (20.8)	61.5 (16.4)	47.3 (8.5)	32.1 (0.1)	19.4 (−7.0)	44.4 (6.9)
Mean daily minimum °F (°C)	4.8 (−15.1)	8.8 (−12.9)	21.3 (−5.9)	33.7 (0.9)	46.6 (8.1)	57.6 (14.2)	61.2 (16.2)	58.8 (14.9)	49.8 (9.9)	35.9 (2.2)	22.6 (−5.2)	11.0 (−11.7)	34.3 (1.3)
Mean minimum °F (°C)	−19.4 (−28.6)	−14.3 (−25.7)	−4.6 (−20.3)	15.6 (−9.1)	29.7 (−1.3)	43.0 (6.1)	47.3 (8.5)	44.3 (6.8)	31.9 (−0.1)	17.9 (−7.8)	2.5 (−16.4)	−12.4 (−24.7)	−22.9 (−30.5)
Record low °F (°C)	−40 (−40)	−38 (−39)	−27 (−33)	−2 (−19)	15 (−9)	30 (−1)	32 (0)	25 (−4)	15 (−9)	−3 (−19)	−21 (−29)	−44 (−42)	−44 (−42)
Average precipitation inches (mm)	0.67 (17)	0.73 (19)	1.47 (37)	2.99 (76)	3.97 (101)	4.45 (113)	3.30 (84)	3.46 (88)	3.25 (83)	2.35 (60)	1.10 (28)	0.85 (22)	28.59 (726)
Average snowfall inches (cm)	6.0 (15)	8.8 (22)	5.7 (14)	4.0 (10)	0.1 (0.25)	0.0 (0.0)	0.0 (0.0)	0.0 (0.0)	0.0 (0.0)	1.0 (2.5)	5.5 (14)	8.5 (22)	39.6 (101)
Average precipitation days (≥ 0.01 in)	5.4	5.4	5.8	8.3	12.5	13.4	9.8	9.7	8.6	7.5	4.6	5.5	96.5
Average snowy days (≥ 0.1 in)	4.5	4.6	2.9	1.4	0.1	0.0	0.0	0.0	0.0	0.6	2.1	4.4	20.6
Source: NOAA

== Demographics ==
Historical population
Census	Pop.	Note	%±
1880	222		—
1890	1,232		455.0%
1900	2,536		105.8%
1910	2,475		−2.4%
1920	3,325		34.3%
1930	3,489		4.9%
1940	4,682		34.2%
1950	5,269		12.5%
1960	5,324		1.0%
1970	5,328		0.1%
1980	4,887		−8.3%
1990	4,554		−6.8%
2000	4,280		−6.0%
2010	4,317		0.9%
2020	4,215		−2.4%
2021 (est.)	4,160		−1.3%
U.S. Decennial Census; 2020 Census

=== 2020 census ===
As of the 2020 census, Pipestone had a population of 4,215. The median age was 39.9 years. 24.2% of residents were under the age of 18 and 21.7% of residents were 65 years of age or older. For every 100 females there were 90.0 males, and for every 100 females age 18 and over there were 87.8 males age 18 and over.

0.0% of residents lived in urban areas, while 100.0% lived in rural areas.

There were 1,859 households in Pipestone, of which 28.3% had children under the age of 18 living in them. Of all households, 40.8% were married-couple households, 20.8% were households with a male householder and no spouse or partner present, and 31.0% were households with a female householder and no spouse or partner present. About 37.9% of all households were made up of individuals and 16.9% had someone living alone who was 65 years of age or older.

There were 2,068 housing units, of which 10.1% were vacant. The homeowner vacancy rate was 2.0% and the rental vacancy rate was 17.4%.

Racial composition as of the 2020 census
Race	Number	Percent
White	3,382	80.2%
Black or African American	93	2.2%
American Indian and Alaska Native	89	2.1%
Asian	39	0.9%
Native Hawaiian and Other Pacific Islander	0	0.0%
Some other race	351	8.3%
Two or more races	261	6.2%
Hispanic or Latino (of any race)	517	12.3%

=== 2010 census ===
As of the census of 2010, there were 4,317 people, 1,923 households, and 1,084 families living in the city. The population density was 1,032.8 inhabitants per square mile (398.8/km^{2}). There were 2,134 housing units at an average density of 510.5 per square mile (197.1/km^{2}). The racial makeup of the city was 90.2% White, 0.9% African American, 1.9% Native American, 1.1% Asian, 3.5% from other races, and 2.4% from two or more races. Hispanic or Latino of any race were 5.2% of the population.

There were 1,923 households, of which 27.4% had children under the age of 18 living with them, 41.6% were married couples living together, 11.3% had a female householder with no husband present, 3.5% had a male householder with no wife present, and 43.6% were non-families. 38.4% of all households were made up of individuals, and 17.9% had someone living alone who was 65 years of age or older. The average household size was 2.17 and the average family size was 2.86.

The median age in the city was 40.8 years. 23.9% of residents were under the age of 18; 7.9% were between the ages of 18 and 24; 22.1% were from 25 to 44; 25.1% were from 45 to 64; and 20.9% were 65 years of age or older. The gender makeup of the city was 46.6% male and 53.4% female.

=== 2000 census ===
As of the census of 2000, there were 4,280 people, 1,900 households, and 1,138 families living in the city. The population density was 1,090.8 inhabitants per square mile (421.2/km^{2}). There were 2,097 housing units at an average density of 534.4 per square mile (206.3/km^{2}). The racial makeup of the city was 94.23% White, 0.28% African American, 2.94% Native American, 0.75% Asian, 0.05% Pacific Islander, 0.35% from other races, and 1.40% from two or more races. Hispanic or Latino of any race were 0.96% of the population.

There were 1,900 households, out of which 28.9% had children under the age of 18 living with them, 46.8% were married couples living together, 10.1% had a female householder with no husband present, and 40.1% were non-families. 35.8% of all households were made up of individuals, and 19.9% had someone living alone who was 65 years of age or older. The average household size was 2.22 and the average family size was 2.89.

In the city, the population was spread out, with 24.7% under the age of 18, 8.7% from 18 to 24, 24.9% from 25 to 44, 20.3% from 45 to 64, and 21.5% who were 65 years of age or older. The median age was 39 years. For every 100 females, there were 88.2 males. For every 100 females age 18 and over, there were 83.6 males.

The median income for a household in the city was $30,412, and the median income for a family was $40,194. Males had a median income of $28,180 versus $21,349 for females. The per capita income for the city was $17,253. About 8.3% of families and 9.7% of the population were below the poverty line, including 11.0% of those under age 18 and 11.1% of those age 65 or over.

== Economy ==
In 2006, Suzlon Energy of India began building wind farm blades at its subsidiary Suzlon Rotor Corporation in the town. Among the companies buying the blades is Wind Capital Group which is developing the biggest wind farm in Minnesota. They have closed down.

Ellison meats was founded in 1934 and has been a part of the Pipestone community since the early 1980s and moved to its current facility in 1990. In 2007, Ellison's was acquired by the J&B Group of St Michael, MN. J&B, founded in 1979, is the producer of "No Name" and "Midwest Pride" brand name products.

== Arts and culture ==
=== Museums and other points of interest ===
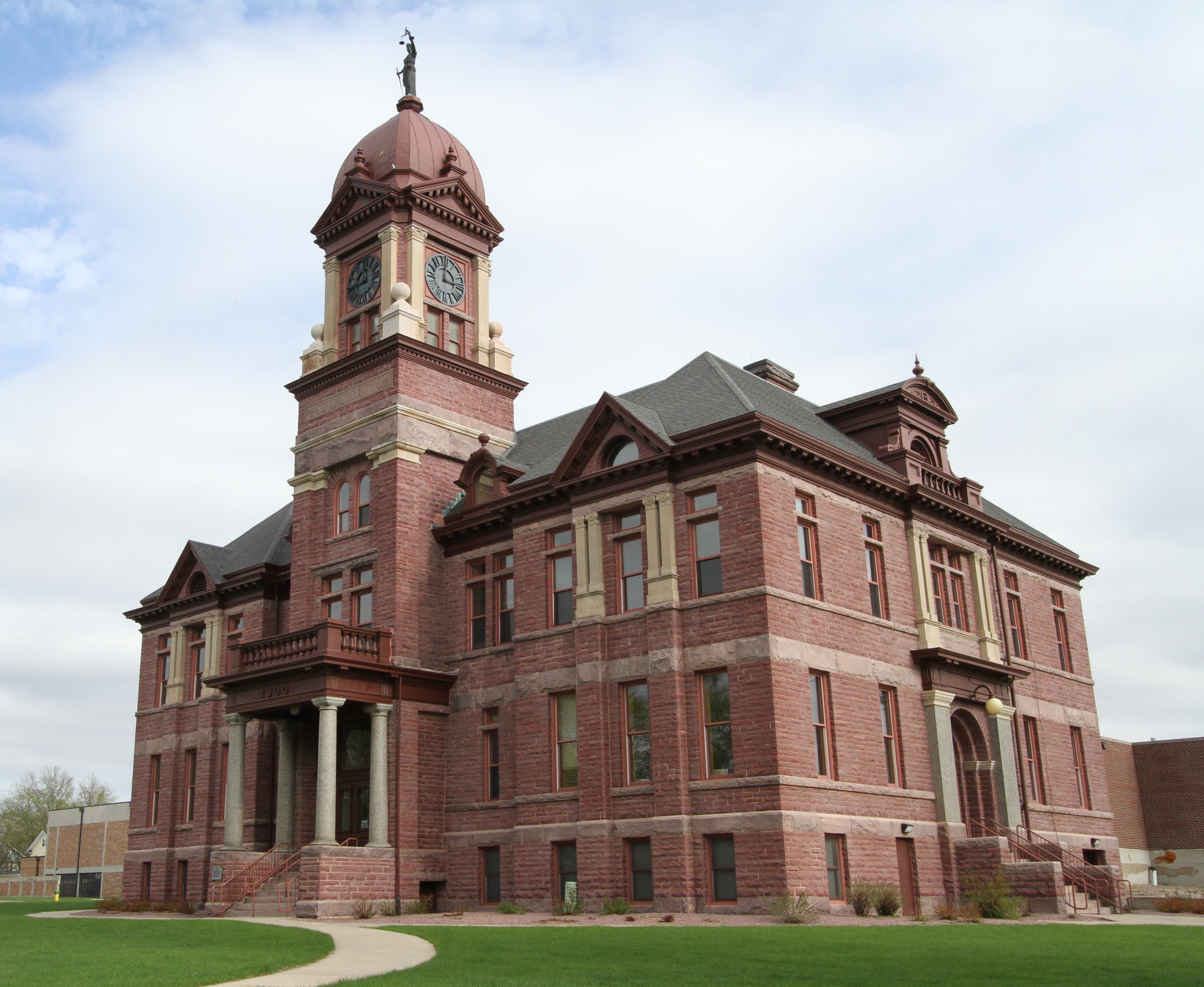
Pipestone Courthouse

The Calumet Inn in downtown Pipestone is a restored historical building from 1888. It still operates as a functioning hotel. It features turn-of-the-century (19th to 20th) antiques and interesting architecture. The building was constructed using quartzite both structurally and in the facade. It is listed on the National Register of Historic Places.

The county Courthouse, also made of local quartzite stone, was built in 1899. The building is the most stylized of the quartzite buildings. It is rectangular in shape with a 110-ft clock tower topped with a dome and a statue of Lady Justice. It was restored in 1995 and rededicated in 1996. It is also listed in the National Register of Historic Places.

In March 1905 the First Presbyterian Church had William Jennings Bryan as a speaker. He drew hundreds to Pipestone to hear his lecture.

Native Americans have used the pipestone quarries located at the Pipestone National Monument for centuries to obtain materials for pipe making, a practice that continues today. On the 282 acres (1.14 km^{2}) site are a visitor and cultural center, 3/4 mile walking trail along Pipestone Creek, and Winnewissa Falls set in the tallgrass prairie. Pipestone Indian Shrine Association provides visitors with a selection of American Indian art and craft items. The pipestone quarry is described in Native American legends as a square-cut jewel lying upon folds of shimmering green velvet. This is an accurate depiction of the red quartzite almost hidden by prairie grass. It was designated a national monument by the United States in 1937.

=== Song of Hiawatha Pageant ===
Although he never visited the site, Henry Wadsworth Longfellow was inspired to write of the area in the poem, "Song of Hiawatha". The Song of Hiawatha Pageant, which spins out Longfellow's vision of the American Indian, played in Pipestone for 60 years. The pageant was held at a small quarry lake on a natural amphitheater with a cast of 200 principals, chieftains, warriors, and dancers in their colorful costumes. Summer of 2008 was the last year for the pageant.

== Politics and government ==
=== Federal government ===
Minnesota is represented in the United States Senate by Democrats Amy Klobuchar and Tina Smith. In the House of Representatives, Pipestone is located in the 7th congressional district.

=== State government ===
Pipestone is represented by Republican Bill Weber in the Minnesota Senate and Republican Joe Schomacker in the Minnesota House.

== Education ==
Pipestone Area School District #2689 serves the community of Pipestone and surrounding area. Pipestone Area High School, a 197,000-square-foot (18,300 m^{2}) middle and high school, opened in January 2003. Minnesota West Community & Technical College operates a campus in Pipestone.

== Infrastructure ==
=== Transportation ===
U.S. Highway 75 and Minnesota State Highways 23 and 30 are three of the main routes in the city.

== Notable people ==
- Catrina Allen, professional disc golfer, two-time PDGA World Champion
- Joachim H. Appeldorn, former member of the Minnesota House of Representatives
- Adelaide George Bennett (1848–1911), poet and botanist
- Eddie Bentz, bank robber
- Harold Rawdon Briggs, senior British Indian Army officer
- Phil Bruns, actor and writer
- Stanley Crooks, former chair, Shakopee Mdewakanton Sioux Community
- Vern Ehlers, former United States Representative for Michigan, was born in Pipestone.
- Roy Alexander Gano, former admiral in the United States Navy
- Bill Hager, former member of the Florida House of Representatives
- Charles Tisdale Howard, a United States attorney, district court judge, and speaker of the South Dakota House of Representatives, lived in Pipestone from 1911 until his death in 1936.
- Akash Kapur, author, whose mother is from Pipestone and he spent many summers and other periods there.
- Verne Long, former member of the Minnesota House of Representatives
- John Lutz, actor, comedian and screenwriter
- Mike Menning, former member of the Minnesota House of Representatives
- Loran B. Morgan, ophthalmologist and inventor of the Morgan Lens
- Donald Petersen, former CEO of Ford Motor Company
- Kathleen Sekhon, Minnesota state legislator and educator
- Hugh Smith, news anchor
- Isaac Snell, football player
- Harry E. Wheeler, geologist and stratigrapher
- Bill Genaust, U.S. Marine combat cameraman who filmed the second flag raising on Iwo Jima
- George G. Hicks, co-founder of Värde Partners and minority owner of the Minnesota Twins
- Francis L. Sampson, U.S. Army chaplain, major general, and World War II veteran known as "The Parachuting Padre"
- Torrey Smith, NFL wide receiver and two-time Super Bowl champion who lived in Pipestone as a child
