= Harry E. Wheeler =

Harry Eugene Wheeler
- Born: 1907; Pipestone, Minnesota, United States
- Died: 26 January 1987 (aged 79–80)
- Education: University of Oregon; Stanford University
- Known for: Sequence stratigraphy
- Scientific career
- Fields: Paleontology, Stratigraphy
- Workplaces: University of Nevada, University of Washington

Harry Eugene Wheeler (1907 – 26 January 1987) was an American geologist and stratigrapher. Eric Cheney called him "the chief theoretical architect of sequence stratigraphy"

Wheeler was a professor of geology at the University of Washington from 1948 until 1976.

== Work on stratigraphy ==
Wheeler's work in the 1950 and 1960s was pivotal in the later development of sequence stratigraphy, which is still used today, for example by petroleum industry geologists. His 1964 paper, Baselevel, Lithosphere Surface, and Time-Stratigraphy evolved the concept of base level to emphasize the continuous spatial and temporal nature of stratigraphy, eventually giving rise to Wheeler diagrams:

But what of stratigraphic discontinuities as manifestations of nondeposition and accompanying erosion? Here we pass into the realm of no less important but completely abstract, area-time framework, in which a discontinuity takes on 'area-time' configuration in the form of the lacuna, which in turn, consists of hiatus and degradation vacuity.

== Wheeler diagrams ==
The Wheeler diagram is a spatio-temporal plot, showing the (usually one dimensional) spatial distribution of sedimentary facies through time in a two-dimensional chart. Three-dimensional seismic data allows the construction of three-dimensional Wheeler 'diagrams', but these are rare because of the difficulty of producing them.
