= Keating Building =

Historic building in San Diego, California, U.S.

- U.S. Historic district – Contributing property
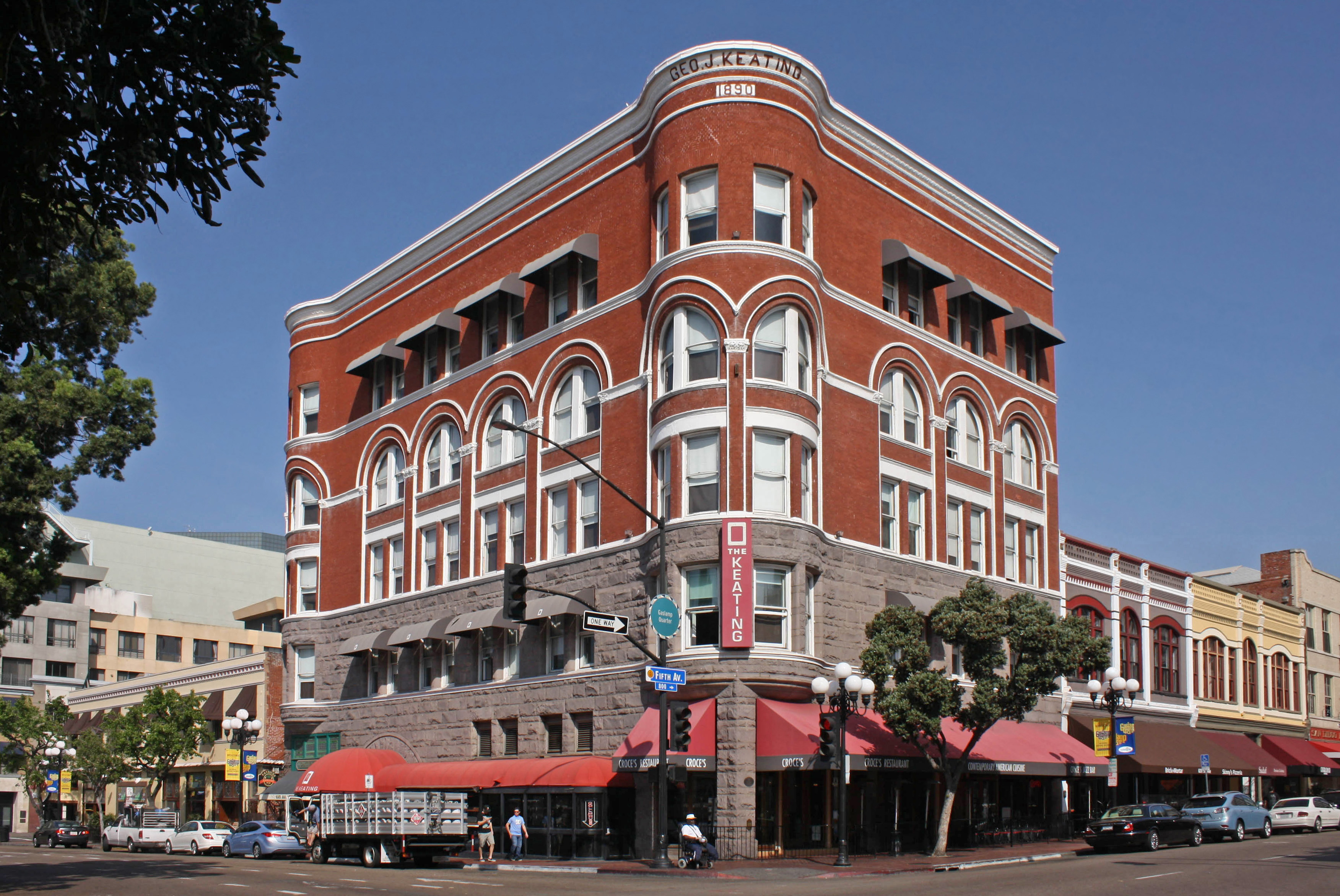
- Interactive map of Keating Building
- Location: Northwest corner of 5th & F street, San Diego, California
- Coordinates: 32°42′50″N 117°9′37.5″W
- Built by: Reid Brothers
- Architect: George J. Keating
- Architectural style: Romanesque Revival
- Part of: Gaslamp Quarter Historic District (ID80000841)
- Designated CP: May 23, 1980

The Keating Building, also known as the Keating Hotel, is a 35-room luxury boutique hotel in San Diego, California. Located in the center of the Gaslamp Quarter, the Keating is located near the San Diego Convention Center, Petco Park, and Balboa Theatre.

The Keating is a five-story Romanesque Revival–style building, built as an office building with then modern conveniences of steam heat and a wire cage elevator, in 1890. It was designed by George J. Keating and was completed by the Reid Brothers after Keating's death. The San Diego Savings Bank occupied the corner space in the building from 1893 to about 1912, and its old safe was still in the building in 1980.

In the 2000s its interior was redesigned by Pininfarina and in 2007 it was re-opened as the Keating Hotel.

In 2012, the hotel was featured on the FOX reality series Hotel Hell starring Gordon Ramsay.

In 2020, the hotel's temporary closure was announced on its official Facebook account due to the COVID-19 pandemic.

As of 2026, the hotel is open and listed on Airbnb as hosted by "At Mine Hospitality".
