= John Olson (Minnesota politician) =

American politician

Member of the Minnesota Senate from the 11th, 19th and 26th district
- In office January 6, 1959 – January 3, 1977
- Preceded by: Andy "A.A." Anderson
- Succeeded by: Mike Menning

Personal details
- Born: December 4, 1906 Worthington, Minnesota, U.S.
- Died: July 2, 1981 (aged 74)
- Party: Republican
- Children: 4
- Occupation: Farmer, legislator

John L. Olson (December 4, 1906 – July 2, 1981) was an American politician and a member of the Minnesota Senate from southwestern Minnesota. First elected in 1958 when he defeated incumbent senator A. A. "Andy" Anderson of Luverne, Olson was re-elected in 1962, 1966, 1970 and 1972. He represented the old districts 11, 19 and 26, which included all or portions of Murray, Nobles, Pipestone and Rock counties, changing somewhat through redistricting in 1960 and 1970.

From the city of Worthington, Olson was a livestock farmer. His farm, Elm Lawn, was located on Rural Route 2. He allied with the Conservative Caucus at a time when the legislature was still officially nonpartisan, although he identified as and was known to be a Republican.

While in the legislature, Olson was an advocate for agriculture and issues relevant to education and natural resources. He served on the Senate Education, Finance, General Legislation, Labor & Commerce, Liquor Control, Natural Resources & Agriculture, and Rules & Administration committees, and on various other committee incarnations and subcommittees during his 18 years in office. He was chair of the General Legislation Committee from 1967 to 1971, and of the Higher Education Committee from 1971 to 1973.

After leaving the senate in 1977, Olson retired to his home on Lake Street. He enjoyed traveling to many places, including the Holy Land and a cruise to Alaska with his beloved wife, Martha. He remained active in his community and church.

He died of a prolonged illness in hospital in July 1981. His funeral was held at First Lutheran Church of Worthington and was attended by many.
