= Kathleen Sekhon =

American politician and educator

Kathleen Sekhon (born May 19, 1948) is an American politician and educator.

Sekhon grew up in Pipestone, Minnesota. She received her bachelor's degree in elementary education from the University of Minnesota Duluth. She lived with her husband and children in Burns Township, Anoka County, Minnesota. She taught in the Anoka County Schools. Sekhon served in the Minnesota House of Representatives from 1993 to 1998 and was a Democrat.
