= Joachim H. Appeldorn =

American businessman and politician

Joachim Henry "J. Henry" Appeldorn (May 18, 1885 – July 7, 1972) was an American farmer, businessman, and politician.

Appeldorn was born in Paullina, Iowa. He moved to a farm with his wife and family to Pipestone, Minnesota. He was the president and land appraiser of the United States Federal Land Baker Association of Pipestone County and also served on the Pipestone Town Board for twelve years. Appeldorn served in the Minnesota House of Representatives from 1947 until 1954.
