= Calumet Hotel (Pipestone, Minnesota) =

- U.S. National Register of Historic Places
- U.S. Historic district – Contributing property
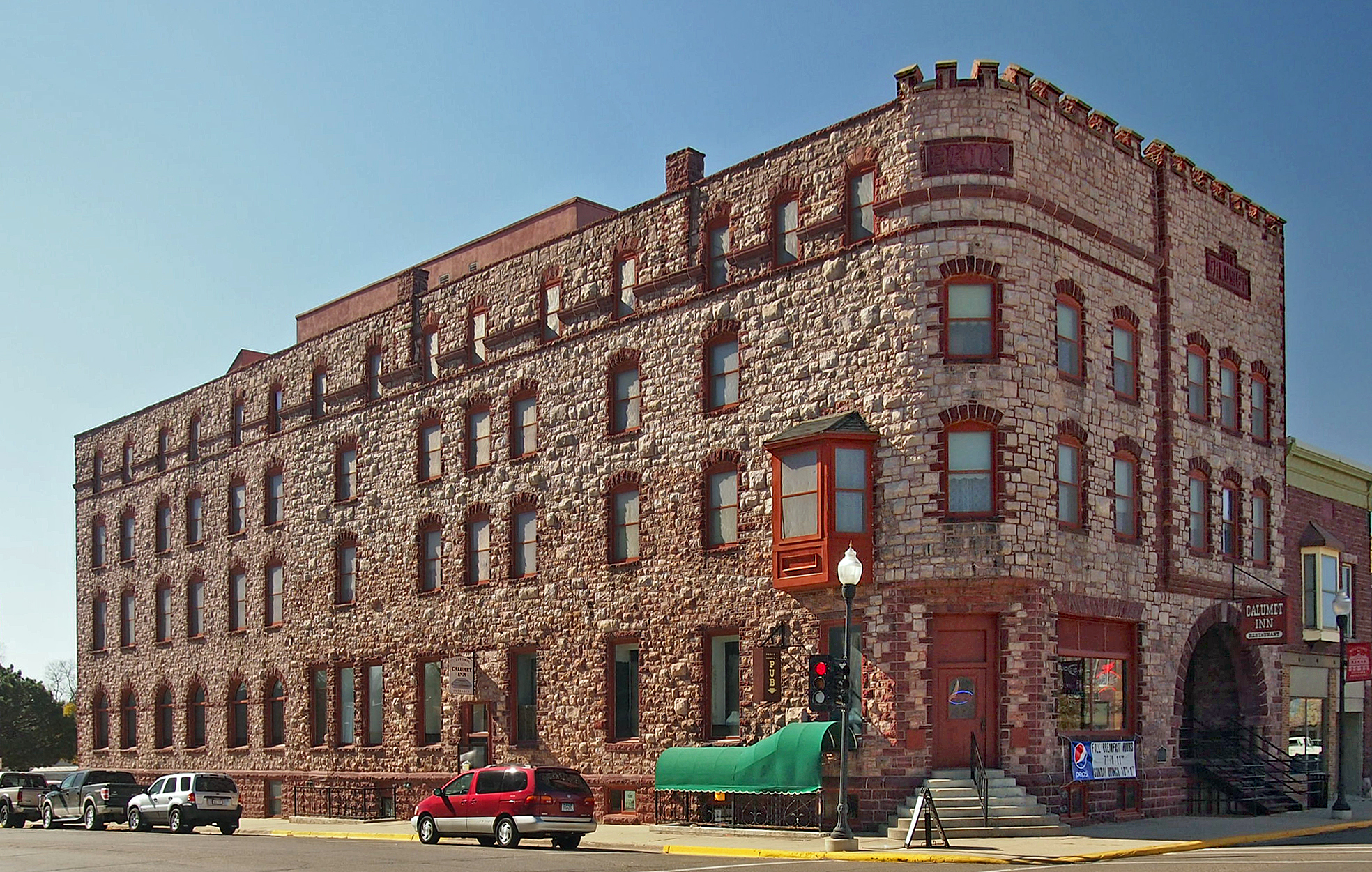
- The Calumet Hotel from the northwest

- Location within Minnesota Location within the United States
- Location: 104 W. Main St., Pipestone, Minnesota
- Coordinates: 44°0′1″N 96°19′4″W
- Area: less than one acre
- Built: 1888
- Architect: Smith, C.; Frost, William
- Architectural style: Richardsonian Romanesque
- Part of: Pipestone Commercial Historic District (ID77000761)
- MPS: Pipestone County MRA (AD)
- NRHP reference No.: 76001066
- Added to NRHP: March 16, 1976

The Calumet Hotel, also known as the Calumet Inn, anchors the historic district of downtown Pipestone, Minnesota, United States. The three-story Richardsonian Romanesque hotel was built with light pink jasper quartzite as opposed to the red Sioux quartzite used in most other downtown buildings. The present hotel was built to replace a previous hotel, also three-stories, which was destroyed in an 1886 fire.

== History ==
Like its predecessor, the Calumet Hotel was built to meet a demand which was growing as a result of increased railroad traffic. It opened on Thanksgiving Day, 1888 with a guest capacity of 50. It has been enlarged twice, a three-story addition to the south in 1899 differentiated by round rather than square window caps, and fourth story built in 1913, bringing the total number of rooms to 90. Among the various businesses to occupy the first floor and basement of the building were First National Bank and a 14-hole miniature golf course. A fire in 1944 destroyed the floors in the south section, but the hotel was able to reopen the following April. By 1978 it had declined to the point that it was condemned by the State Fire Marshal. After two years of thorough renovation the hotel was again able to open for business.

== Architecture ==
Architectural details include the oriel window, a replica of the original which was removed along with the balcony in 1912, a large quartzite arch, the corner door, and a crenelated cornice.

== In popular culture ==
Gordon Ramsay's Hotel Hell covered the hotel in an episode of the series, broadcast on August 18, 2014, on the U.S. Fox television network.
