= Hotel Hell =

2012 American reality television series

- Genre: Reality television
- Created by: Gordon Ramsay
- Developed by: Mark Burnett
- Starring: Gordon Ramsay
- Narrated by: Gordon Ramsay
- Opening theme: "Hotel Hell" by Skyhooks (seasons 1–2)
- Country of origin: United States
- Original language: English
- No. of seasons: 3
- No. of episodes: 22

Production
- Executive producers: Adeline Ramage Rooney; Ben Adler; Gordon Ramsay; Patricia Llewellyn
- Running time: 43 minutes
- Production company: One Potato Two Potato

Original release
- Network: Fox
- Release: August 13, 2012 – July 26, 2016

Hotel Hell is an American reality television series created, hosted and narrated by Gordon Ramsay, which ran on the Fox network for three seasons from 2012 to 2016. It aired on Monday nights at 8 pm ET/PT. It was Ramsay's fourth series for the Fox network.

The series features Ramsay visiting various struggling lodging establishments throughout the United States in an attempt to reverse their misfortunes, following a similar concept established in Ramsay's other programs Ramsay's Kitchen Nightmares and its American counterpart Kitchen Nightmares.

== Broadcast ==
Originally scheduled to premiere on Fox on April 6, 2012, the series was first rescheduled to June 4, 2012 in order to accommodate the move of The Finder, then rescheduled to August 13, due to Ramsay's other two series, Hell's Kitchen and MasterChef, being scheduled for Monday nights during the summer.

The series' first season, which consisted of six episodes, ended on September 3, 2012. On August 31, 2012, Fox renewed Hotel Hell for a second season, which premiered on July 21, 2014.

== Episodes ==
=== Series overview ===
Season	Episodes	Originally released	
Season	Episodes	First released	Last released
1	6	August 13, 2012	September 3, 2012
2	8	July 21, 2014	September 9, 2014
3	8	May 24, 2016	July 26, 2016

=== Season 1 (2012) ===
No. overall	No. in season	Title	City	Original release date	Prod. code	US viewers (millions)
1	1	"Juniper Hill Inn, Part One"	Windsor, Vermont	August 13, 2012	HOT-104	5.12
Ramsay visits the town's historical hotel, where the locals feel that they are out of place due to an atmosphere that they call "upper crust". Robert Dean II, the hotel's owner, gives Ramsay a stunning room, but it smells of "raw sewage", owing to plumbing problems. Juniper Hill's restaurant not only overcharges for food, with prices more befitting a gourmet restaurant, but the food isn't properly cooked. The staff tell their stories of not being paid for their work; when they are paid, they get just a fraction of the money owed. Ramsay then discovers that Robert and his boyfriend and co-owner, Ari Nikki, bring their friends to the hotel where they stay, eat and drink for free without leaving a tip. An employee then shows Ramsay Robert's four storage units, the basement and the office – all of which are filled with antiques and collectibles. After a disastrous dinner rush, Ramsay holds a staff meeting where Robert shows a serious lack of respect for his staff, angering Ramsay and ending the episode in a To Be Continued cliffhanger.
2	2	"Juniper Hill Inn, Part Two"	Windsor, Vermont	August 14, 2012	HOT-105	5.09
The visit comes to a head when Ramsay discovers that Robert has been taking a percentage of the servers’ tips. He approaches Robert in his $100,000 motor coach to explain his findings, mandating that he calls a friend to explain the tip situation, only to be told that she left money with Robert. At that point, Ramsay storms out in his own SUV. Ramsay, originally thinking that Juniper Hill was a lost cause, returns with an appraiser to determine the value of Robert's antique collection, only to find that most of the supposedly original paintings turned out to be reproductions and the antiques were not at all valuable. Robert, realizing his errors, apologizes to the staff. Ramsay further compounds the situation when he brings in former guests of this hotel to rate their experience, angering Ari. This led to the hotel's refurbishment and relaunch, with Ramsay's invitation to the locals to visit. The only change to the rooms was to repair the plumbing problem. The hotel went into foreclosure with debts of $1.4 million in April 2014. A year later, it was sold to new owners and reopened as the Windsor Mansion Inn.
3	3	"Cambridge Hotel"	Cambridge, New York	August 20, 2012	HOT-101	5.17
Ramsay tries to save the hotel known for creating the Pie à la Mode in the 1890s. John Imhof is a lawyer and former Army judge whose management of the hotel is out-of-order according to Ramsay, who sees him as an ineffective busybody. The kitchen uses boil-in-the-bag precooked food, and their famed pie is frozen and raw. Ramsay redesigns the decor and menu, introducing a new room to enjoy the freshly baked pie with homemade ice cream. To show John that the staff can manage the hotel without his interference, Ramsay locks him in a derelict upstairs room. The packed service is completed without a hitch, and John begins to trust his staff. Ramsay is particularly pleased with Scooter, a young kitchen assistant who has undergone two heart surgeries and back surgery, and offers to fund the remainder of his college education. Despite Ramsay's efforts, the hotel closed prior to the episode's airing due to a decision of the lender bank. It was eventually converted into a nursing home.
4	4	"The Keating Hotel"	San Diego, California	August 27, 2012	HOT-102	5.90
Ramsay visits a hotel in the Gaslamp Quarter of San Diego where rooms cost $800 per night. The owner Eddie Kaen is a property developer who is a fan of Ferrari cars and he has decorated the hotel to his personal tastes, which lean more to form over function. The chef at the hotel restaurant has a hard time saying "no" to the owner's menu suggestions, such as chocolate-bacon-strawberry pizza and chicken parmigiana sliders. Room service orders are delivered in cardboard boxes and plastic containers, which do not befit a luxury hotel. Ramsay redecorates the rooms and redesigns the menu, and convinces the owner to allow his staff to tell him "no" when needed. The hotel is open and reviews are mixed with praise for location and service but complaints about the rooms.
5	5	"River Rock Inn"	Milford, Pennsylvania	September 3, 2012	HOT-103	4.51
Ramsay finds that the owner, Ken Pisciotta, micromanages his staff, and the hotel looks dated and dirty. At dinner Gordon continues to be disappointed. He is served frozen chicken kabobs with processed egg rolls and an oversized, messy chicken Valdostano. To help Ken, Gordon brings in the VP of Operations of Caesars Palace Las Vegas to educate the staff on how to make customers feel welcome. Ramsay decides that the hotel could benefit from a woman's touch, and encourages the owner (who is single and rarely leaves the hotel) to get out and mingle. Ramsay acts as his "wingman" and arranges for him to meet a woman and get her phone number. Changes to the inn include a new sign outside, updates to the guest rooms, lobby and check in area. Other amenities include a new online booking system and improved wi-fi throughout the hotel. After Ramsay left Ken added some menu items but kept most changes. Reviews were mixed about the food and service. Despite its somewhat success, the inn closed in December 2014 and was sold to new owners.
6	6	"The Roosevelt Inn"	Coeur d'Alene, Idaho	September 3, 2012	HOT-106	4.30
Ramsay visits a husband-and-wife-operated inn located at the former Roosevelt Elementary school. The wife, Tina, is a reluctant partner in an impulse real estate investment by her husband, John Hough, a former student of the school. The hotel has been plagued by unwashed linens, outdated decor, and a small kitchen. The food is atrocious. Gordon is served frozen shrimp cocktail, a mushy salmon and a soft boiled egg that is raw in the center. Besides the bad food the owner hosts a monthly gathering for a barely profitable murder mystery, in which he plays the role of Sherlock Holmes. After Gordon finally convinced John to see that change was necessary he and his team started the renovations. Ramsay's team's makeover includes updating the interior decor, devising a home-cooked menu that can be made from the small kitchen, and revamping the hotel's wedding business. A wedding is celebrated the same night of the reveal and runs smoothly. After Ramsay left the owners embraced the changes to decor and menu and remain open with a steady uptick in bookings after the changes were made.

=== Season 2 (2014) ===
No. overall	No. in season	Title	City	Original release date	Prod. code	US viewers (millions)
7	1	"Meson De Mesilla"	Las Cruces, New Mexico	July 21, 2014	HOT-201	3.99
Ramsay arrives at the hotel and is immediately put off by the beige color scheme and being asked to sign a damage waiver. He wonders why a hotel in New Mexico is styled after Tuscany, Italy. The food is not very good, and the owner Cali Szczawinski sings karaoke in the style of Cher during dinner services. The pool area is dirty and disused. The owner fires the general manager and asks Ramsay for help. Ramsay and his team redecorate all of the rooms, renovate the pool area and redesign the menu, all in the style of New Mexico. When the owner starts to waver on the changes, Ramsay threatens to put the pool back to the way it was and leave. He also asks her to stop singing and focus on management. She commits to the changes and sees a boost in business. The hotel was sold to new owners and renamed Hacienda De Mesilla in 2017.
8	2	"Monticello Hotel"	Longview, Washington	July 28, 2014	HOT-202	4.06
Only four rooms in the historic hotel are available for use, and all other guests are sent to the adjacent motel. The owner Phillip Lovingfoss inherited the hotel and is wealthy, with a collection of classic cars displayed outside. However, he runs the hotel in a miserly way. The staff informs Ramsay that the owner is severely alcoholic and was jailed the night before for DUI. Ramsay stages an intervention for the owner, renovates the rooms and redesigns the menu. The hotel closed in 2016 due to the owners' debts and was converted into an apartment building in 2019.
9	3	"Applegate River Lodge"	Applegate, Oregon	August 4, 2014	HOT-203	3.85
Ramsay is amazed that a hotel in such a scenic location could be losing money. He finds that the owner Richard Davis' two sons Dusty and Duke run the entertainment and restaurant portions of the hotel but do not share any of the proceeds with his wife Joanna. Guests are often annoyed by late-night jam sessions. Ramsay gets the family to reconcile their differences, renovates the rooms, redesigns the menu, and moves the music to an outdoor location. The hotel is open and the reviews are very mixed with many giving negative reviews of the wedding services and a mixed response to the hotel and restaurant. As of December 2022 the hotel was under new ownership.
10	4	"Hotel Chester"	Starkville, Mississippi	August 11, 2014	HOT-204	3.75
The owner David Mollendor, an experienced hotel consultant, was injured in a car accident five years ago, and the hotel and restaurant have been struggling ever since. His wife Sukie has been trying to run the kitchen, but her dishes do not appeal to the local college crowd and without any kitchen training, her sushi menu takes over an hour per table. They are so far in debt that they are living at the hotel. Ramsay renovates the rooms and beer garden, replaces the Japanese menu with attractive casual American food along with a robatayaki grill, and obtains a chef and an apartment for them to give them time to get back on their feet. The hotel is open with the Gordon Burger still popular as is the new beer garden. Reviews are very positive with compliments on the customer service, rooms and food.
11	5	"Calumet Inn"	Pipestone, Minnesota	August 18, 2014	HOT-208	3.99
The once-historic hotel is being run by two spoilt sisters, Rina and Vanda Smrkovski, who received it as a gift from their father. However, the sisters are not up to running the hotel and blame all of their shortcomings on everything except themselves, including the hard-working staff. Ramsay gives them several options: shut down the hotel, sell it, or hand over its operations to a proper general manager. The sisters choose the latter and Ramsay helps improve staff and visitor morale, as well as the hotel and restaurant. He also sends the sisters away to grow up. The hotel is open under new ownership as of 2015. It was briefly shut down in March 2020 due to violations of state fire safety regulations, but those problems were corrected and the hotel reopened a month later. As of May, 2022, the hotel has closed again, due to financial burdens, amid a lawsuit filed by the owners against the city of Pipestone and zoning official Doug Fortune. The owners claimed that they both violated their 5th and 14th Amendment rights, preventing them access when the city condemned the property in 2020. A judge ruled in favor of the city in December of 2024. The owners plan to appeal with no plans to sell the property and are committed to reopening the historic hotel.
12	6	"Four Seasons Inn"	West Dover, Vermont	August 25, 2014	HOT-205	3.84
The hotel is outdated and none of the staff are being paid. It strives to be dog-friendly with a large kennel facility, which nobody uses. The owner Sandy MacDougall tries to be the chef even though he had no training. Ramsay renovates the rooms and the kennel, redesigns the menu, and renames the hotel to Layla's Riverside Lodge (to avoid confusion with Four Seasons Hotels and Resorts, and being named after Sandy's dog, Layla). The owner is encouraged to leave the kitchen and become a full-time innkeeper, and he promises to pay the staff. The hotel was sold in 2022 to Natalie and Julian Dion and renamed it "The Sugar Maple Inn".
13	7	"Curtis House"	Woodbury, Connecticut	September 1, 2014	HOT-207	3.86
Ramsay learns that he is the only guest at the inn, where owners TJ Brennan and Chris Hardisty are bickering siblings. Their attitudes towards each other cause stress within their family, as well as the staff at the inn. The food is disgusting, the linens in the rooms are stained and the private information of guests is stored in an unsafe manner. Through a one on one with former guests, an emotional staff meeting and a conversation with the siblings Gordon mends the relationship with TJ and Chris and convince them change is the only way forward for the inn. After a reconciling between the two Ramsay moves forward with the renovations which include a brand new menu, updates to the lobby and new decor and furnishings for the rooms. TJ and Chris embraced the changes after Ramsay left but closed the inn in April 2019 for unknown reasons. The inn was sold to new owners in September 2019.
14	8	"Murphys Hotel"	Murphys, California	September 9, 2014	HOT-206	2.41
Brian Goss, Kevin Clerico, and Joel Lacitignola are three friends in their 30s who share ownership in the hotel, but fail to properly manage it, its adjoining bar, and Lacitignola's restaurant. At lunch Gordon is served disgusting, slimy escargot, an anemic, messy lamb shank and a chewy platter of calamari. The restaurant's storage locker contains improperly stored food and non-appetizing meals are served. It also does not tap into the local vintner tradition. In addition, the hotel's front desk closes early, causing visitors to check in at the bar. Those who stay are also disturbed by the party atmosphere from the bar that lasts well-past midnight. Goss appoints himself as general manager, the historic rooms are renovated, an online guest registry is added, and a restaurant menu that includes wine is improved. The trio of owners continued to uphold the changes and their hotel received an uptick in business after Ramsay's visit.

=== Season 3 (2016) ===
No. overall	No. in season	Title	City	Original release date	Prod. code	US viewers (millions)
15	1	"Angler's Lodge"	Island Park, Idaho	May 24, 2016	HOT-302	2.51
Following the death of their 10-year-old son, Dave and Dede Eby lose their passion to run the Angler's Lodge, a business Dave built with his own hands. Gordon is displeased with the sub par food, the old fashioned musty rooms and the lack of leadership shown by the owner's son and restaurant manager Zach. Gordon makes some minor changes to the menu but after a dinner service thinks head chef Gina is not qualified to run the kitchen, even when the menu was pared down. Along with Gina's departure other changes include updating the rooms, a completely new menu and a month of consultation from hotel expert and strategic planner Emily Brown. After Ramsay leaves, both Dave and Dede embrace the changes to their menu and lodge and received an immediate boost in business.
16	2	"Vienna Inn"	Southbridge, Massachusetts	May 31, 2016	HOT-305	2.37
Ramsay tries to get a dysfunctional couple to regain their passion and separate their personal life from their business life. Former guests say the hotel is cluttered and overwhelming, that owners Jonathon and Lisa Krach are unprofessional with their fighting and crying around guests and that they can be too friendly, the food is terrible, and the staff uniforms were often revealing and seemed too much for the setting. Despite a new menu and new décor, the relaunch goes poorly as the owners are unable to cope with the changes. After Ramsay leaves the owners return to their old menu, old décor, and old ways, and the hotel was ultimately closed after a fire mysteriously broke out in November 2017.
17	3	"Town's Inn, Part 1"	Harpers Ferry, West Virginia	June 7, 2016	HOT-303	2.40
Town's Inn owner Karan Townsend runs her establishment more like a second-hand store, hoarding personal items throughout the premises, which includes two separate buildings: the Heritage House houses guest rooms and a full-service restaurant, while the Mountain Home contains a hostel, guest rooms and a café. Ramsay soon discovers some of the worst practices he has ever seen which include unappetizing frozen food, filthy amenities and an owner in denial. During the dinner service, Ramsay finds that the kitchen is in need of new equipment and a leader. He shuts the service down when he finds out Karan’s staff serves frozen, store-bought rotisserie chicken, boils premade burgers, and uses old, processed ingredients stored outside of the restaurant in moldy freezers.
18	4	"Town's Inn, Part 2"	Harpers Ferry, West Virginia	June 14, 2016	HOT-304	2.54
After shutting down Karan’s kitchen in the middle of dinner service and discovering a filthy bathroom that failed a bacteria test, Gordon has a heart-to-heart talk with Karan and her staff to convince her that change will be essential to move forward. After Gordon speaks with Karan and her son Jason, she is ready for updates and Gordon green-lights the renovations which include a brand-new store room which replaces Karan’s old living quarters, new renovated spaces and rooms upstairs, and some new equipment in the kitchen along with a sleek, new dining room. Other gifts from Ramsay include a two-month stay at a house in town, replacing her cramped, uncomfortable room in the inn and a trip to the spa for a make-over for Karan. After Ramsay leaves, she embraces all his changes to the menu, rooms, and kitchen. After her two-month stay at the house Gordon rented her, she moved back into a room on the second floor of the inn. The restaurant closed in 2017. Business has increased since Ramsay's visit.
19	5	"Lakeview Hotel"	Chelan, Washington	June 21, 2016	HOT-307	2.62
The hotel has a bad local reputation with complaints about the food and service, especially not allowing children in the hotel despite having an on-site ice cream shop. Upon arrival, Gordon is appalled by the abundance of dust at the reception desk and in the restaurant. His room is old fashioned, dusty and dated. At lunch, Gordon is disgusted when he's served a runny, premade Minestrone soup, a cheeseburger made with frozen meat and paper thin patties and a turkey sandwich made with low quality ingredients and served with a overly salty broth. During dinner service, Ramsay encourages the owners Brent and Afni MacDonald to get past their lies and denials and make the necessary changes. After a commitment to change from the owners, Gordon and his team redesigns the menu to feature fresh food and local wines as well as redesigning several rooms and outfitting them with new beds, sheets, decor and furniture. He also connects them with local business leaders. After he leaves, the owners revert to their old ways. The hotel was sold to new owners in summer 2021 and renamed The Landing. Reviews were very mixed prior to closure with both complaints and praise of service and atmosphere at the hotel.
20	6	"Brick Hotel"	Newtown, Pennsylvania	June 28, 2016	HOT-306	3.14
The owners Verindar Kaur and her son Chiranjiv "CJ" Jouhal bought the hotel ten years ago as a "turnkey" investment despite their lack of hotel experience, with Verindar as a child therapist and CJ working in IT. However, the hotel has not turned a profit since. The owner aggressively micromanages the staff and is resented for it, as evidenced by very high turnover rate. Ramsay urges her to delegate responsibility and only handle escalated issues. Gordon gets through to the owner and after her commitment to change goes ahead with the renovations. Changes include redesigned rooms and lobby along with a new menu that suits both casual and formal events. After Ramsay leaves CJ helps Verindar take a step back from the business and they embrace all the changes made to the hotel and menu. Reviews are mostly good, business is better and their reputation is on the mend in their community. The hotel is open under new ownership as of 2018.
21	7	"Beachfront Inn & Inlet"	Fort Pierce, Florida	July 19, 2016	HOT-301	2.41
Gordon travels to Fort Pierce, Florida to help save the Beachfront Inn & Inlet, a seaside inn and restaurant with a young owner named Brian Paul at the helm. Upon arrival Gordon finds overpriced merchandise at the gift shop and that staff must pay for their own uniform and nametags. His room smells of musk and mold, the decor is outdated and there is dirt and dust everywhere. At lunch Ramsay is served dry chicken wings, a confusing lobster mac and cheese and a frozen tuna burger even though the owner claimed all the restaurant's seafood and fish was fresh. During his kitchen inspection, Ramsay finds an old tub of foaming cocktail mix, cross contaminated meat and old produce. During dinner service, Gordon sees how little the kitchen communicates and witnesses complaints from customers about the noise from bargoers and one lady who suffered an allergy attack from the dust in an air conditioning unit. Gordon talks to Brian about being an owner, and after his commitments goes ahead with renovations. Updates include new rooms and a fresh bistro style menu. During relaunch, Brian is frazzled with orders and can't serve the town's mayor her food. A frustrated Ramsay leaves the hotel seeing that Brian hadn't taken his advice. A few months later Brian finally implemented some changes Gordon recommended and his hotel has been more popular ever since. The hotel closed in 2019 after being sold to new ownership.
22	8	"Landoll's Mohican Castle"	Loudonville, Ohio	July 26, 2016	HOT-308	2.49
Gordon meets owner Marta Landoll who works countless hours to keep her hotel and events business afloat. After assessing the situation, he urges her son Jimmy to learn the business and take the reins from his mother. Together, they throw a fairytale wedding at the castle. The hotel is open as bookings have increased. Reviews see praise from couples especially for the idyllic building and food and service is praised. In 2018, they built a new block called The Stables, that contains 14 new suites.

== Ratings ==
Hotel Hell : U.S. viewers per episode (millions)

Season	Episode number							
Season	1	2	3	4	5	6	7	8
1	5.12	5.09	5.17	5.90	4.51	4.30	–	
2	3.99	4.06	3.85	3.75	3.99	3.84	3.86	2.41
3	2.51	2.37	2.40	2.54	2.62	3.14	2.41	2.49

Audience measurement performed by Nielsen Media Research

== See also ==
- Hotel Impossible
- The Hotel Inspector
