= Guilty Until Proven Insane =

Studio album by Skyhooks
- Released: 13 March 1978
- Studios: Armstrong Studios, Melbourne and Trafalgar Studios, Sydney
- Length: 38:38
- Label: Mushroom
- Producer: Eddie Leonetti

Skyhooks chronology
The Skyhooks Tapes (1977)	Guilty Until Proven Insane (1978)	Live! Be in It (1978)

Singles from Guilty Until Proven Insane
- 1. "Women in Uniform" Released: March 1978; 2. "Meglomania" Released: May 1978

Guilty Until Proven Insane is the fourth studio album released by Skyhooks on 13 March 1978. It was the first album to feature Bob Spencer, who replaced guitarist Red Symons in early 1977. Spencer had played in Sydney rock band Finch and would later become a member of the Angels.

== Details ==
The album's name comes from a line in the song "Twisted Innocence", which states 'if I'm guilty until proven insane...' The first 5000 copies of the album were available in red vinyl. It is the first of Skyhooks' albums to include an uncensored version of "Why Dontcha All Get Fucked" recorded in a studio, as opposed to live and censored versions. It is also the last album vocalist Graeme "Shirley" Strachan made with Skyhooks before the recording sessions which would be released as The Lost Album.

In April 1979, 350 copies of the album were seized by Victorian vice squad detectives. Senior Constable John Challis said, "The record in question was by the Skyhooks called "Guilty Until Proven Insane" and one song was suspected of being obscene."

Two singles were released from the album. "Women in Uniform" was a Top 10 hit nationwide, while "Megalomania" peaked at number 93. The sixth track in the album, "Hotel Hell", was used on the FOX reality series Hotel Hell starring Gordon Ramsay.

== Reception ==
Professional ratings
Review scores
Source	Rating
AllMusic	3/5 stars

Donald Robertson, writing in Roadrunner, expressed disappointment with the album: "I'm afraid to say it's a really patchy affair. Apart from the cracking "Women in Uniform" the album lacks the sparkle and wit of the stage act and the previous albums. I only hope Greg Macainsh goes back to writing songs about Australia. No one does it better."

Rip It Up magazine's Jeremy Templer wrote that: "Like the Rolling Stones, Skyhooks still feel something of an obligation to be outrageous but they remain as strikingly original as when they first began."

== Track listing ==
Side A
No.	Title	Writer(s)	Length
1.	"Women in Uniform"	Greg Macainsh	4:21
2.	"Life in the Modern World"	Macainsh	3:23
3.	"Trouble with the Computer"	Macainsh	4:53
4.	"BBBBBBBBBBBBBoogie"	Imants "Freddie" Strauks	3:00
5.	"Twisted Innocence"	Macainsh	3:46

Side B
No.	Title	Writer(s)	Length
1.	"Hotel Hell"	Macainsh	4:46
2.	"Point in the Distance"	Macainsh	6:23
3.	"Meglomania"	Macainsh	4:07
4.	"Why Dontcha All Get Fucked"	Macainsh	3:59

== Personnel ==
- Graeme "Shirley" Strachan – lead vocals
- Bob Spencer – guitar, backing vocals
- Bob "Bongo" Starkie – guitar
- Greg Macainsh – bass guitar, narration
- Imants "Freddy" Strauks – drums, percussion, backing vocals

=== Additional personnel ===
- Joe Camilleri (Courtesy OZ Records), Wilbur Wilde – saxophones on "Hotel Hell"
- Tony Ansell – piano on "Why Dontcha All Get Fucked"; organ on "Meglomania"
- Eddie "Spag" Leonetti – organ on "Twisted Innocence"; string machine on "Point in the Distance"

== Charts ==
Chart performance for Guilty Until Proven Insane
Chart (1978)	Peak position
Australian Kent Music Report Albums Chart	6
