= Loran B. Morgan =

American ophthalmologist

Loran B. Morgan (October 14, 1918 – November 23, 2009) was a United States ophthalmologist best known as the inventor of the Morgan Lens.

== Early years, 1918-43 ==
Loran B. Morgan was born in Pipestone, Minnesota on October 14, 1918. the fourth of five children born to Mabelle and William Morgan.

Morgan knew from a young age that he wanted to be a doctor. After graduating from high school in 1936, he attended the University of Minnesota and then the University of Minnesota Medical School, graduating in March 1943. He then interned at St. Luke's Hospital in Denver. While in Denver, he met his wife, Beth Ashburn, a native of Torrington, Wyoming, who was then a nurse, but who subsequently stayed at home to raise the couple's two children.

== Army career, 1943-46 ==
While in medical school, Morgan served in the medical division of the Reserve Officers' Training Corps, and was commissioned as a first lieutenant in the United States Army in 1941. After completing his internship, he was called up by the army in December 1943 and sent to Carlisle Barracks for medical officer training. He married Beth in Carlisle Barracks in January 1944. He spent the next ten months receiving Army training, including in parachute jumping. He was stationed at Camp Forrest when he was sent to the battlefield.

During World War II, Morgan served with the 40th Parachute Field Artillery Battalion. His battalion saw action on March 24, 1945, as part of Operation Varsity. Of the 300 men who made the initial jump, 50 were killed and 100 were injured, and as the battalion surgeon, he was the first doctor the wounded saw. Morgan was awarded a Bronze Star Medal for his work as a doctor during this time. An interview with Morgan detailing his experiences as a doctor during this operation, and later during the Battle of the Bulge, was featured on the History Channel in 1999.

== After the war, 1946-57 ==
After his discharge from the army in 1946, Morgan traveled to Torrington, Wyoming, where his wife and daughter (born on October 24, 1944, while Morgan was overseas) had lived while he was in Europe. He was then hired as a company doctor by the Empire Zinc Company, moving his young family to Gilman, Colorado. However, in 1948, during a visit to his wife's family in Torrington, he was struck with appendicitis and Dr. Krahl, the doctor who operated on him, convinced Morgan to join his practice in Torrington. He spent the next several years working as a general practitioner in Torrington.

== Ophthalmologist in Torrington, Wyoming, 1960-81 ==
After suffering chest pains in October 1956, his physicians in Denver convinced Morgan to give up the demanding schedule of a general practitioner. In January 1957, Morgan returned to the University of Minnesota Medical School for three years of training as a specialist in ophthalmology. He returned to Torrington on January 11, 1960, and opened his practice, also working as the Chief Consultant in Ophthalmology for the Veterans Administration Hospital in Hot Springs, South Dakota. Although Torrington was a small community, Morgan was able to draw in patients from the surrounding area, eventually having 7,500 active files.

=== Service in Vietnam (1967-70) and the invention of the Morgan Lens ===
By 1966, Morgan had become aware of the pressing need for physicians to serve in Vietnam in the wake of the Vietnam War and therefore signed up for the Volunteer Physicians for Vietnam program organized by the American Medical Association. He spent two months in Vietnam in spring 1967; a second two-month tour in 1968; a third two-month tour in 1969; and a fourth one-month tour in 1970. During his time there, he and other ophthalmologists provided treatment for injured Vietnamese civilians.

During Morgan's third Vietnam War tour as a volunteer physician, he concluded that many serious eye problems developed in individuals because fairly simple infections had not been treated adequately. Morgan noted that to protect the eye from being severely infected, it was necessary to have a means for steadily delivering sterile fluid or medication to the eye. Morgan noted that, especially in a war zone or an emergency room, medical personnel rarely had the time to continue administering eye drops to a patient continuously for a long enough period of time to thoroughly cleanse an irritated or infected eye.

As such, in February 1969, in Vinh Long, Morgan molded a simple device for cleaning the eye. Morgan was familiar with contact lenses (wearing them himself and often prescribing them to his patients), and his first Morgan Lens was larger than a modern contact lens, resembling the early contact lenses of the 1940s. Morgan initially called the device the Therapeutic Lens Corneal, later renaming it the Morgan Medi-Flow Lens (today it is normally called simply the Morgan Lens). Later versions of the Morgan Lens were smaller and contained directional fins.

Today, MorTan, Inc., based in Missoula, Montana, and headed by Morgan's son Dan (b. Aug. 1948), continues to manufacture and sell the Morgan Lens.

Morgan continued to practice as an ophthalmologist in Torrington until 1981, when he sold his practice.

== Later years ==
After selling his practice, Morgan enrolled at the University of Connecticut Health Center, spending two years studying glaucoma and neuro-ophthalmology. He became an assistant professor there three months later. From there, he continued to maintain a national practice before entering a state of semi-retirement, splitting his time between Torrington and Palm Desert, California.

== Death ==
“Doc” Morgan died on November 23, 2009, at Community Hospital in Torrington, Wyoming at the age of 91. His grave is at Valley View Cemetery in Torrington.
