= Roy Alexander Gano =

United States Navy admiral (1902–1971)

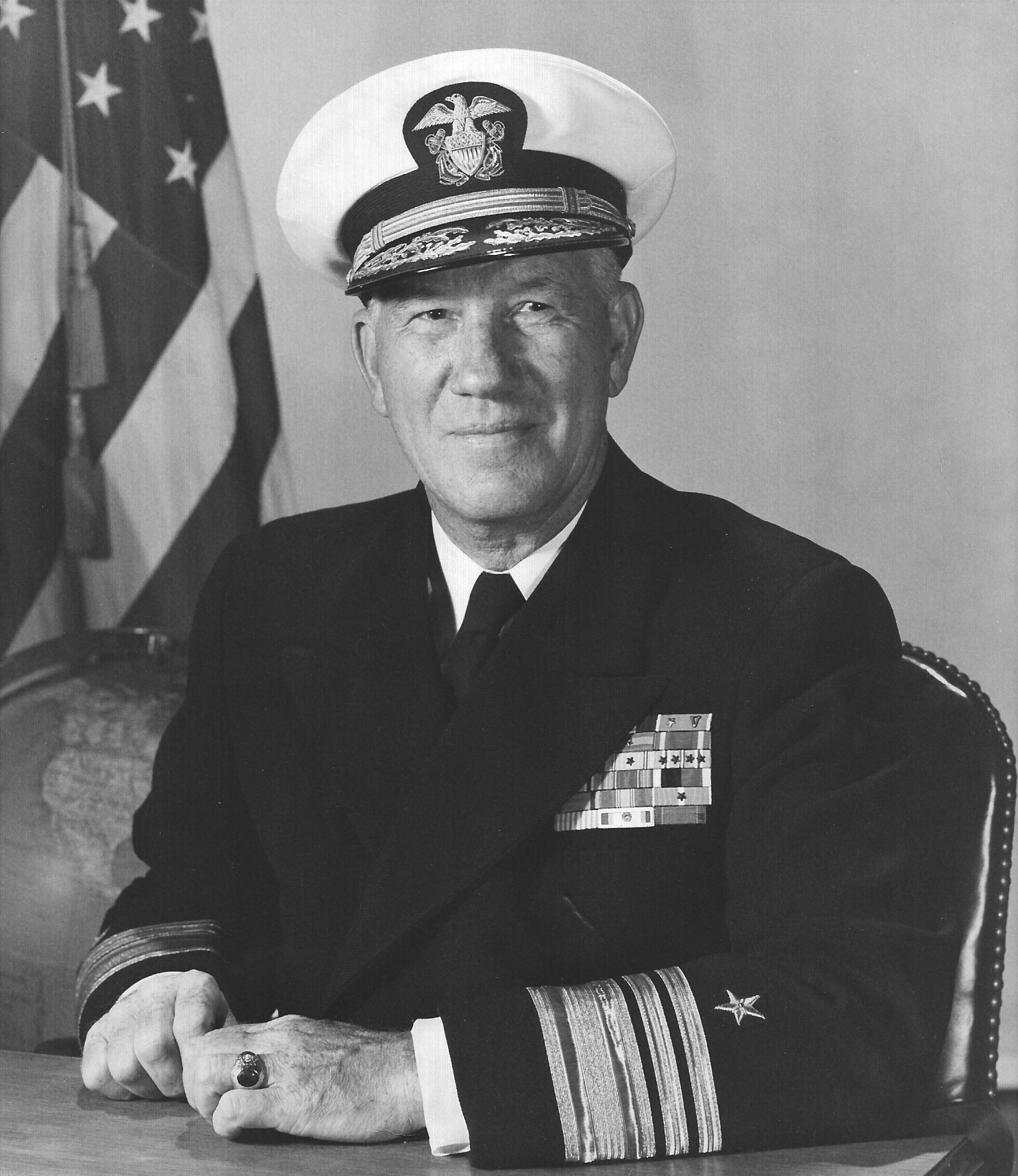
- Vice Admiral Roy A. Gano, 1963
- Born: December 3, 1902; Pipestone, Minnesota, US
- Died: January 20, 1971 (aged 68); Falls Church, Virginia, US
- Burial place: Arlington National Cemetery
- Military career
- Allegiance: United States of America
- Branch: United States Navy
- Service years: 1922–1964
- Rank: Vice Admiral
- Nickname: "Red"
- Commands: Military Sea Transportation Service (1959–1964)
- Conflicts: World War II; Korean War
- Awards: Navy Cross (2); Navy Distinguished Service Medal; Legion of Merit (2); Bronze Star (2)

Roy Alexander "Red" Gano (December 3, 1902 – January 20, 1971) was a vice admiral of the United States Navy who distinguished himself in World War II, Korean War, and the Cold War, and served as Commander Military Sea Transportation Service (now Military Sealift Command) and as executive director for Ocean Transportation from 1961 to 1964.

== Early life and career ==
A native of Pipestone, Minnesota, Gano attended the United States Naval Academy and graduated in 1926. He returned to the Academy as a postgraduate student in 1934.

He married Harriet Pauline Howard, July 18, 1929. Admiral and Mrs. Gano had two children, Myrtle Eugenia "Jeanne" Gano Steele (1940–2006) and James Alexander Gano (1946–2005).

Gano spent much of his early career at sea. He served first in the battleship USS Tennessee (BB-43) (1926–29), then was assigned to several destroyers: USS John D. Edwards (DD-216) (1929–30), USS Edsall (DD-219) (1930–31) USS MacLeish (DD-220) (1931–32), and as Engineer on board USS Dewey (DD-349) (1934–37).

From 1937 to 1939, he served as Special Engineer, United States Navy Research Lab, Bellevue, Washington. In 1941, he was assigned as Material Officer and Commander, Destroyer Battle Force.

== From World War II to retirement ==
Gano spent the first part of the war in seagoing commands. He served as Material Officer and Commander, Task Force 8, Alaska (1941–42) and Commander of the destroyer USS Dyson (DD-572) (1942–44) in Destroyer Squadron 23. The latter squadron, known as the "Little Beavers", covered the initial landings in Bougainville in November 1943 and fought in 22 engagements during the next four months. For 1944–46, he served as Assistant Director, United States Navy Communications for Administration, Office of the Chief of Naval Operations, Washington, D.C.

From 1946 to 1948, Gano served as Commander, Destroyer Squadron 5, also Destroyer Division 51, Japan-Korea area. He then returned to shore duty as Director of Recruiting, Bureau of Naval Personnel (1948–50), then as Director, Enlisted Personnel Division (1950–51).

He returned to sea in 1951 as commander of the cruiser USS Saint Paul (CA-73), deployed to Korea for the Korean War, a command he held until 1952. He was then assigned as Chief of Staff and Aide to the Commander, Service Force, U.S. Pacific Fleet (1952–54) and Commander, Service Squadron 3, in the evacuation of refugees from Northern Indochina (1954).

In 1954, Gano was promoted to vice admiral, and was assigned as assistant chief for logistics, holding that position until 1955. He then served as deputy chief of staff for administration, Far East and U.N. Commands (1955–56), deputy commander, Military Sea Transportation Service (1956–58), commander, Amphibious Group 2 (1958–59), and commander, Military Sea Transportation Service (1959–64).(In 1962, he had visited to Taiwan.)

Admiral Gano retired from active duty in 1964 and then served as vice president of Moore-McCormack Lines, Washington, D.C. (1964–71). He also served as president and chairman of the board of United Seamen's Service from 1961 to 1971. In 1969, he was elected chairman of the board of Hamilton Bank & Trust Company, based in Bailey's Crossroads, Virginia, where he was a director until his death.

The admiral died on January 20, 1971, and was buried at Arlington National Cemetery. His wife, Harriet Howard Gano (1902–1991) is now buried with him.

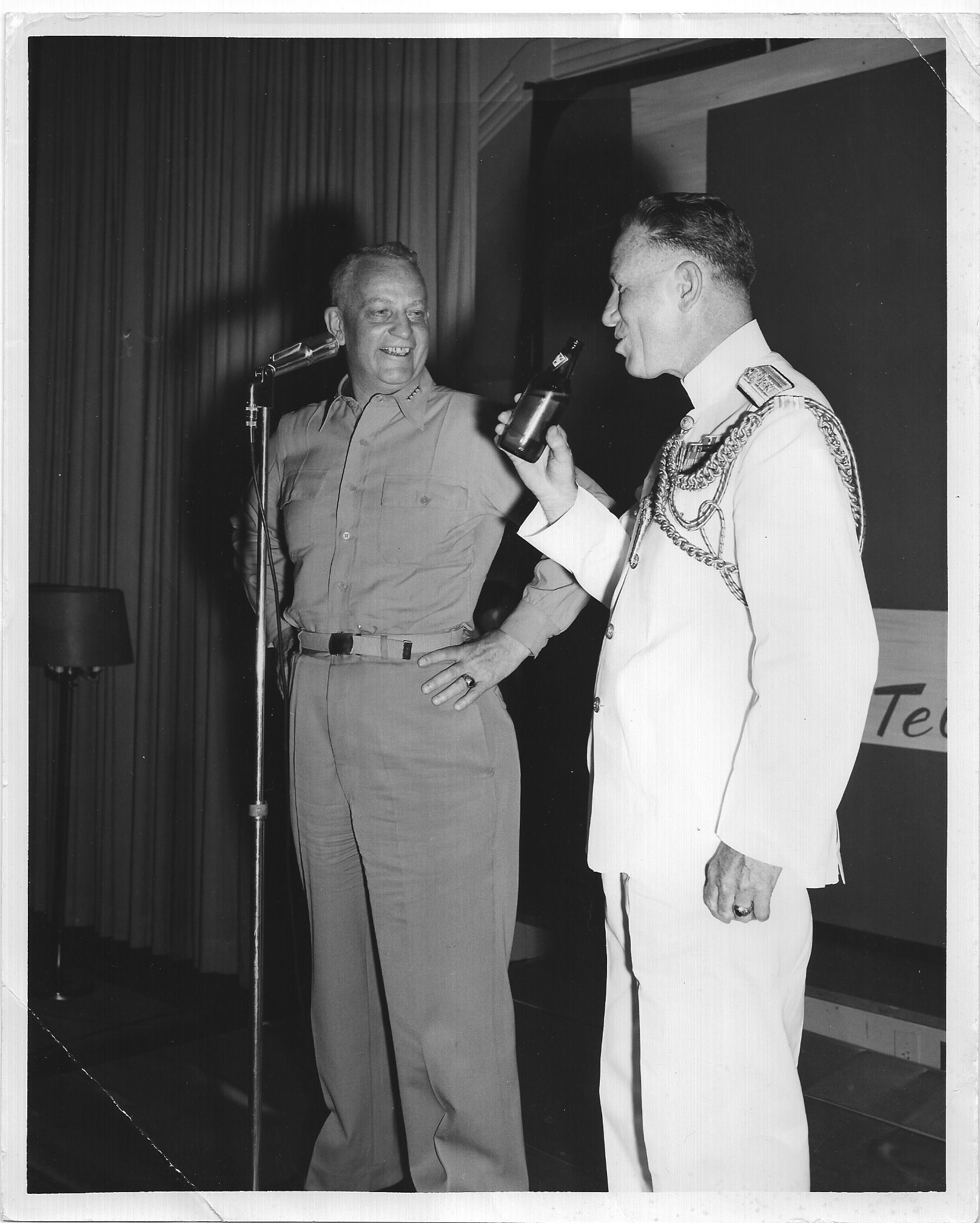
Admirals Arleigh Burke and Gano

== Awards and honors ==
During his career, Admiral Gano was awarded the Bronze Star with gold star, the Navy Cross with gold star, Legion of Merit with gold star, and the Navy Distinguished Service Medal.

Navy Distinguished Service Medal citation:

The President of the United States of America, takes pleasure in presenting the Navy Distinguished Service Medal to Vice Admiral Roy Alexander Gano, United States Navy, for exceptionally meritorious and distinguished service in a position of great responsibility to the Government of the United States during the period 1 June 1961 to 30 June 1964, as executive director for Ocean Transportation and as Commander Military Sea Transportation Service. Responsible for directing the complex military logistical sea lift operations of the Department of Defense, Vice Admiral Gano succeeded in improving the responsiveness of the military sea lift in emergencies; enhanced the understanding of the complementary roles of military and merchant shipping to provide greater readiness to meet emergency demands; and made available and effectively utilized ocean shipping to meet military requirements promptly and efficiently during the Berlin build-up, the Cuban crisis and the critical periods in Southeast Asia. By his brilliant leadership, professional competence, and steadfast devotion to duty, Vice Admiral Gano rendered valuable and distinguished service and contributed greatly to the security of the United States.

Navy Cross citation:

The President of the United States of America takes pleasure in presenting a Gold Star in lieu of a Second Award of the Navy Cross to Captain Roy Alexander Gano, United States Navy, for extraordinary heroism and distinguished service in the line of his profession as Commanding Officer of the Destroyer USS Dyson (DD-572), attached to Destroyer Squadron TWENTY-THREE (DesRon 23), during a night engagement with the six enemy Japanese warships off Bougainville, British Solomon Islands, during the Battle of Empress Augusta Bay on 24 and 25 November 1943. Seeking out and fearlessly engaging a powerful enemy, Captain Gano fought his ship with resolute courage and daring aggressiveness, frequently risking his own personal safety to press home vigorous, unrelenting attacks upon Japanese surface forces. By his extreme valor and inspiring leadership, he evoked the indomitable fighting spirit which enabled the gallant officers and men under his command to contribute materially to the crushing defeat imposed upon the enemy in the sinking of four ships and the serious damaging of two others. An expert seaman and tactician, Captain Gano retired the Dyson from the engagement without loss or damage and his high devotion to duty and splendid conduct throughout the action were in keeping with the highest traditions of the United States Naval Service.

Navy Cross citation:

The President of the United States of America takes pleasure in presenting the Navy Cross to Captain Roy Alexander Gano, United States Navy, for extraordinary heroism and distinguished service in the line of his profession as Commanding Officer of the Destroyer U.S.S. DYSON (DD-509), during an engagement with Japanese naval forces at Empress Augusta Bay, off Bougainville, Solomon Islands, on the night of 1–2 November 1943. With his Task Force engaging a Japanese surface force of superior fire power, Captain Gano hurled the full fighting strength of his ship against the enemy and, by his inspiring leadership and skilled combat tactics, aided his Task Force in sinking five hostile warships, in damaging four others and in completely routing the enemy, thereby contributing materially to the successful establishment of our beachhead on Bougainville Island. His determination, relentless fighting spirit and gallant devotion to duty upheld the highest traditions of the United States Naval Service.

Legion of Merit with Combat V citation:

Awarded for Actions during World War II: Captain Roy Alexander Gano, United States Navy, was awarded the Legion of Merit with Combat "V" for exceptionally meritorious conduct in the performance of outstanding services to the Government of the United States during World War II.

Legion of Merit citation:

Awarded for Actions during the Cold War: Vice Admiral Roy Alexander Gano, United States Navy, was awarded a Gold Star in lieu of a Second Award of the Legion of Merit for exceptionally meritorious conduct in the performance of outstanding services to the Government of the United States.

- Navy Cross with Gold Star
- Navy Distinguished Service Medal
- Legion of Merit with Gold Star
- Bronze Star with Gold Star

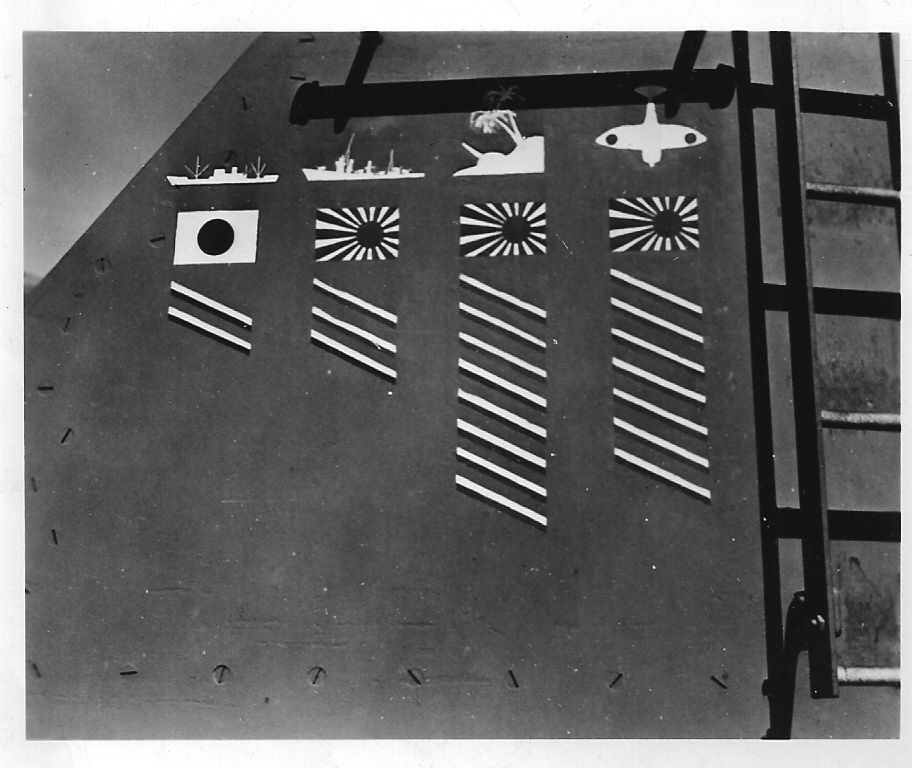
Scoreboard on the USS Dyson's gun director 1944, commanded by Commander Roy A. Gano, which indicates: two Japanese merchant ships and three Japanese warships sunk, eight shore bombardments, and seven Japanese planes shot down

Gravestone
