= Verne Long =

American politician (1925–2022)

Verne E. Long

Member of the Minnesota House of Representatives
- In office 1963–1974

Personal details
- Born: September 24, 1925 Pipestone, Minnesota, U.S.
- Died: March 21, 2022 (aged 96) Pipestone, Minnesota, U.S.
- Party: Conservative
- Occupation: farmer

Verne Everett Long (September 24, 1925 – March 21, 2022) was an American politician from the state of Minnesota.

Long was born in Pipestone, Minnesota, and graduated from Pipestone Area High School in 1942. He was a livestock and grain farmer. He served on the Pipestone Township Board and the Pipestone School Board. Long also served on the University of Minnesota Board of Regents, in the House of Representatives for District 20 from 1963 to 1966, District 20A from 1967 to 1972, and District 26A from 1973 to 1974. Long died at the Good Samaritan Communities of Pipestone, in Pipestone. Long died on March 21, 2022, at the age of 96.
