= Eldorado Hotel =

- U.S. National Register of Historic Places
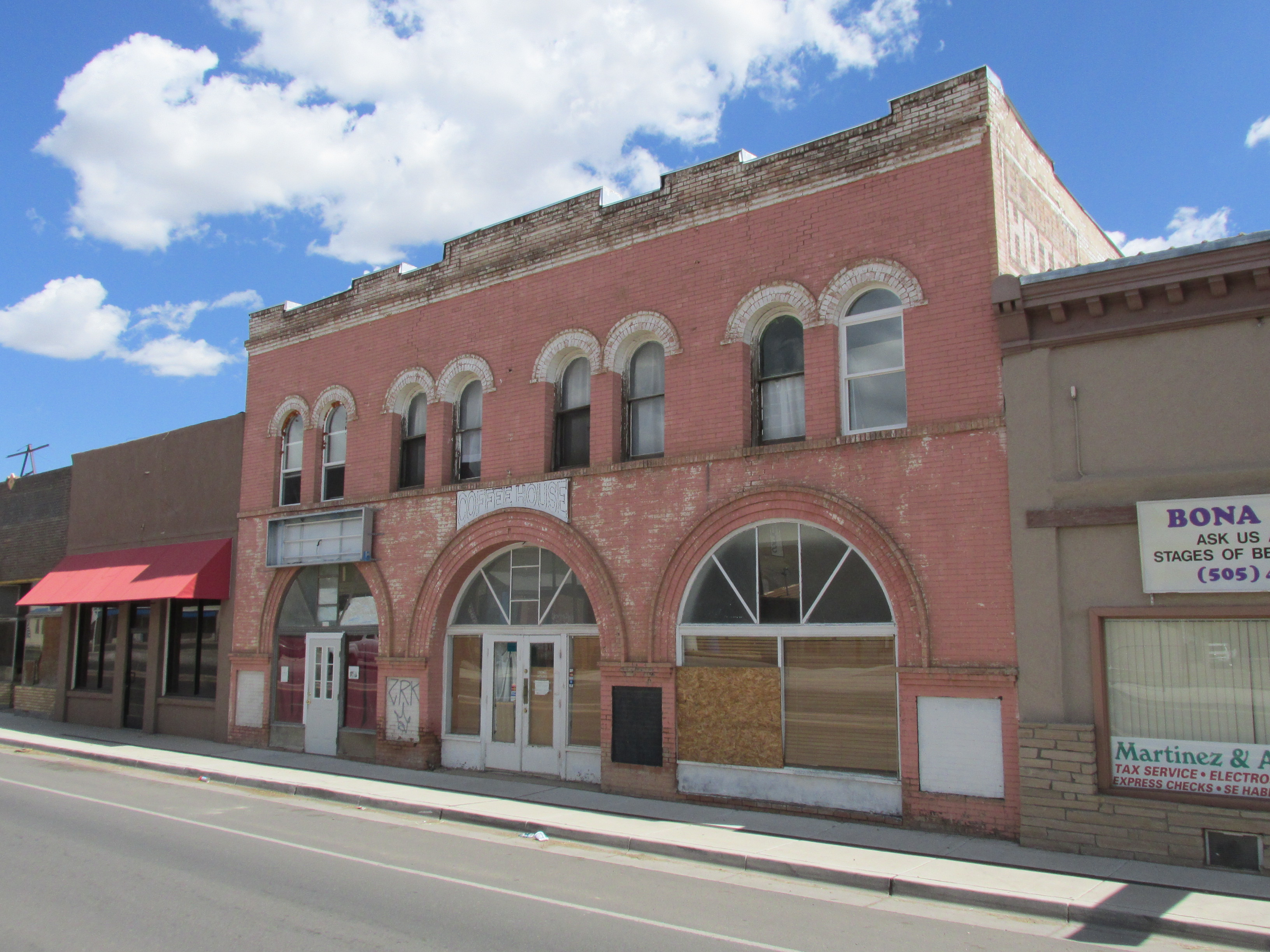

- Location within New Mexico
- Location: 514 Grand, Las Vegas, New Mexico
- Coordinates: 35°35′39″N 105°12′48″W
- Area: less than one acre
- Built: c.1898-1902
- Architectural style: Romanesque, Richardsonian Romanesque
- MPS: Las Vegas New Mexico MRA
- NRHP reference No.: 85002626
- Added to NRHP: September 26, 1985

The Eldorado Hotel, at 514 Grand in Las Vegas, New Mexico, was built around 1900. It was later briefly known as the Monticello Hotel. It was listed on the National Register of Historic Places in 1985.

Based probably the fact that its facade includes semi-circular arches it has been asserted to be Romanesque or Richardsonian Romanesque in style.

Its NRHP nomination asserts "The Eldorado is perhaps the leading remaining example of the local style of brickwork which developed after the establishment of a brickyard in 1898. The arches remain from the Richardsonian Romanesque and the strong symmetry comes from the prevailing classicism. The creativity of local builder/bricklayers shows in the fine embellishments—the stepped and corbeled lines, the projecting brick accents and the recessed panels."

In 1983 it was owned by the city of Las Vegas and was operated as the Vincente Salazar Senior Citizen's Center.
