= Morgan Lens =

Device used for eye irrigation

The Morgan Lens is a sterile plastic device resembling a contact lens connected to tubing that fits over the eye and allows copious irrigation of the eye over time without continuous attendance by medical personnel.

== History ==
The Morgan Lens was developed by Loran B. Morgan, a United States ophthalmologist. During Morgan's third Vietnam War tour as a volunteer physician, he concluded that many serious eye problems developed because fairly simple infections had not been treated adequately. Morgan noted that to protect the eye from being severely infected, it was necessary to have a means for steadily delivering sterile fluid or medication to the eye. Morgan noted that, especially in a war zone or an emergency room, medical personnel rarely had the time to continue administering eye drops to a patient continuously for a long enough period of time to thoroughly cleanse an irritated or infected eye.

Therefore, in February 1969, in Vinh Long, Morgan molded a simple device for cleaning the eye. Morgan was familiar with contact lenses (wearing them himself and often prescribing them to his patients), and his first Morgan lens was larger than a modern contact lens, resembling contact lenses of the 1940s. Morgan initially called the device the Therapeutic Lens Corneal, later renaming it the Morgan Medi-Flow Lens. Later versions of the Morgan lens were smaller and contained directional fins.

== Function ==
The Morgan lens provides ocular irrigation or medication to the cornea and conjunctiva. Once inserted, the Morgan lens floats on the layer of solution it is delivering, never actually touching the cornea.

When inserting the Morgan lens, a topical anesthetic (if available) is first applied to the eye. The Morgan lens is attached to the solution (contained in a bag resembling the bag commonly used in intravenous therapy or in a syringe). After the solution has begun flowing, the medical provider has the patient look down and inserts the lens under the upper eyelid, then has the patient look up and inserts the lens under the lower eyelid.

After insertion, which usually takes less than 30 seconds, medical personnel do not need to attend the patient while the Morgan lens cleanses the patient's eye.

Also, after insertion, the patient is able to close their eyelids while the eye is cleansed. This provides a distinct advantage over manual methods of cleansing the eye (such as inserting eye drops), which require the patient to keep the eye open for an extended period of time and can be very painful to the patient because of an injured patient's natural reaction of closing the eye in response to injury (blepharospasm) as well as the increased light sensitivity of injured eyes.

== Uses ==
The Morgan lens can be used in many situations requiring ocular irrigation or the application of medicine to the eye, including cases of chemical eye burns, thermal burns, irritants (e.g., gasoline, detergent), nonembedded foreign bodies, foreign body sensation with no visible foreign body, routine cleansing before eye surgery or eyelid surgery, or for infections.

The Morgan lens is a standard piece of medical equipment; according to its manufacturer, over 90% of U.S. emergency rooms contain a Morgan lens.

== Manufacture ==
The Morgan lens is made by MorTan, Inc., which is based in Missoula, Montana, and headed by Dr. Morgan's son, Daniel Morgan, and Judy Devine.
