= Monticello Hotel (Longview, Washington) =

American historic former hotel

Coordinates: 46°08′22″N 122°56′24″W

The Monticello Hotel was a historic former landmark hotel and is a current apartment building in Longview, Washington. It was given to the city by founder R. A. Long in early 1923, and designed by Long's architects of choice, Hoit, Price, and Barnes, of Kansas City.

The Monticello Hotel

Built between November 1922 and opening on July 14 of 1923, the "Hotel Monticello" was the first permanent building for the new planned city of Longview. Originally holding 200 hotel rooms spread over its 7 floors, it now holds 60 rooms.

Several other hotels named Hotel Monticello exist in the Washington, D.C. area. The Hotel in Longview is named after a former wood frame Hotel dating to the 1870s that was demolished in the construction of the new city, which itself was named after the historic Monticello Convention document, signed in the tiny settlement of Monticello, Oregon Territory at the time, near the site of the hotel, petitioning the US Congress to grant the residents north of the Columbia River a separate territory, which ultimately led to the establishment of Washington Territory and Washington state. Monticello itself is a reference to Thomas Jefferson's estate in Virginia.

The lobby, partially subdivided in a 1964 renovation, features Brazilian mahogany paneled walls, above which are a series of oil paintings by Joe Knowles depicting the early years of the settlement of western North America, including depictions of the Marcus Whitman expedition rafting the lower Columbia River and portraits of many early American notables such as John McLoughlin of the Hudson's Bay Company.

The hotel closed in 2016 due to the owners' debts and underwent a multi-million-dollar renovation to restore it to its original glory. The Monticello Hotel opened its restored Crystal Ballroom and new Speakeasy in August 2017 to a packed crowd. The ballroom was designed with at the time modern terrazzo floors, polychrome details, and 42 pilasters signifying Washington as the 42nd State. New additions to the ballroom in the Speakeasy addition are Tiffany glass, and the 1888 Al Capone Chicago Bar, a 22-foot solid oak bar allegedly owned and operated by Al Capone. In June 2018, the new Monticello Wood-fired Pizzeria opened in the former lounge section, and closed in 2019. The restaurant then became a steakhouse.

In 2019, it was converted into an apartment building.

== In popular culture ==
Gordon Ramsay (Hotel Hell) covered the hotel in an episode of the series, broadcast on July 28, 2014, on U.S. Fox television network.
