= List of lakes of Minnesota =

This is a list of lakes of Minnesota. Known as the "Land of 10,000 Lakes", Minnesota has 11,842 lakes of 10 acres (4.0 ha) or more. The 1968 state survey found 15,291 lake basins, of which 3,257 were dry. If all basins over 2.5 acres (1.0 ha) were counted, Minnesota would have 21,871 lakes. All but four of Minnesota's 87 counties (Mower, Olmsted, Pipestone, and Rock) contain at least one natural lake. Due to the abundance of lakes, many names have been repeated; for example, there are more than 200 Mud Lakes, 150 Long Lakes, and 120 Rice Lakes. Minnesota's lakes provide 44,926 miles of shoreline, more than the combined lake (~32,000 mi) and coastal (3,427 mi) shorelines of California.

Lakes whose coordinates are included below are visible in linked OSM map. Minnesota's lakes are cataloged by the state Department of Natural Resources with a unique DNR Division of Waters Lake Number, which is listed for a subset of lakes in the table below. The lakes are ordered by their unique names, (e.g. Lake Smith or Smith Lake would both be listed under "S").

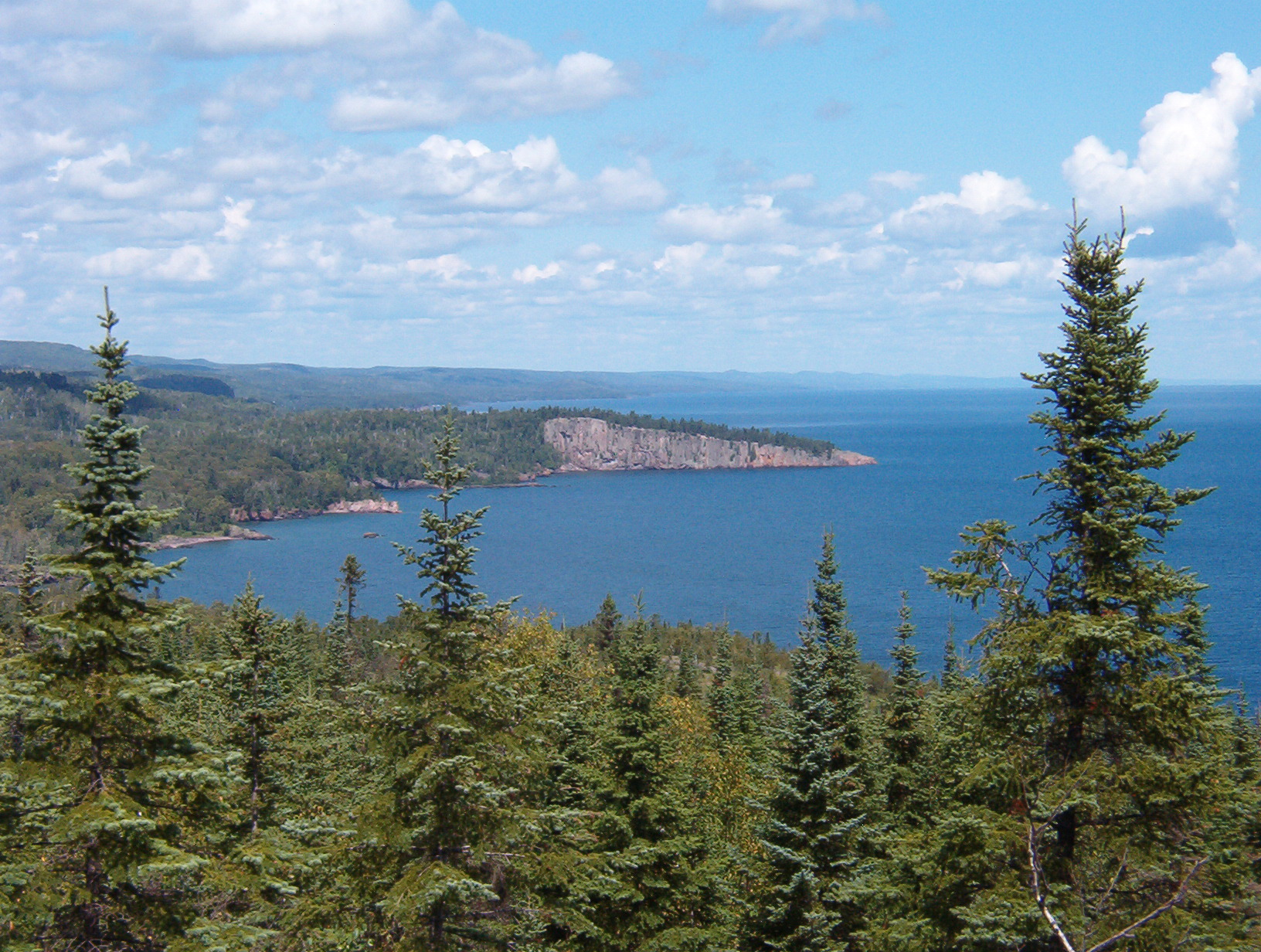
Lake Superior

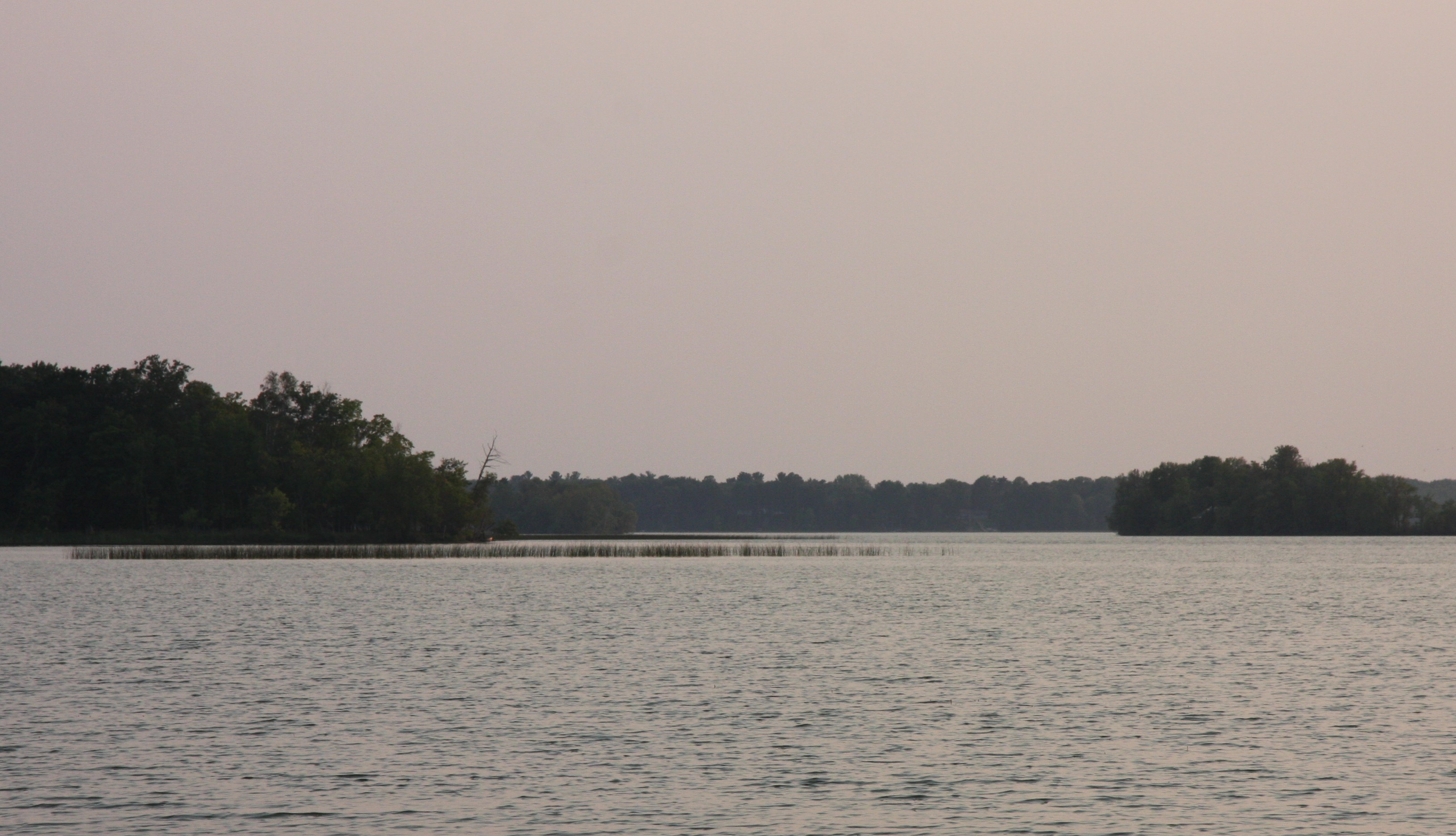
Mille Lacs Lake

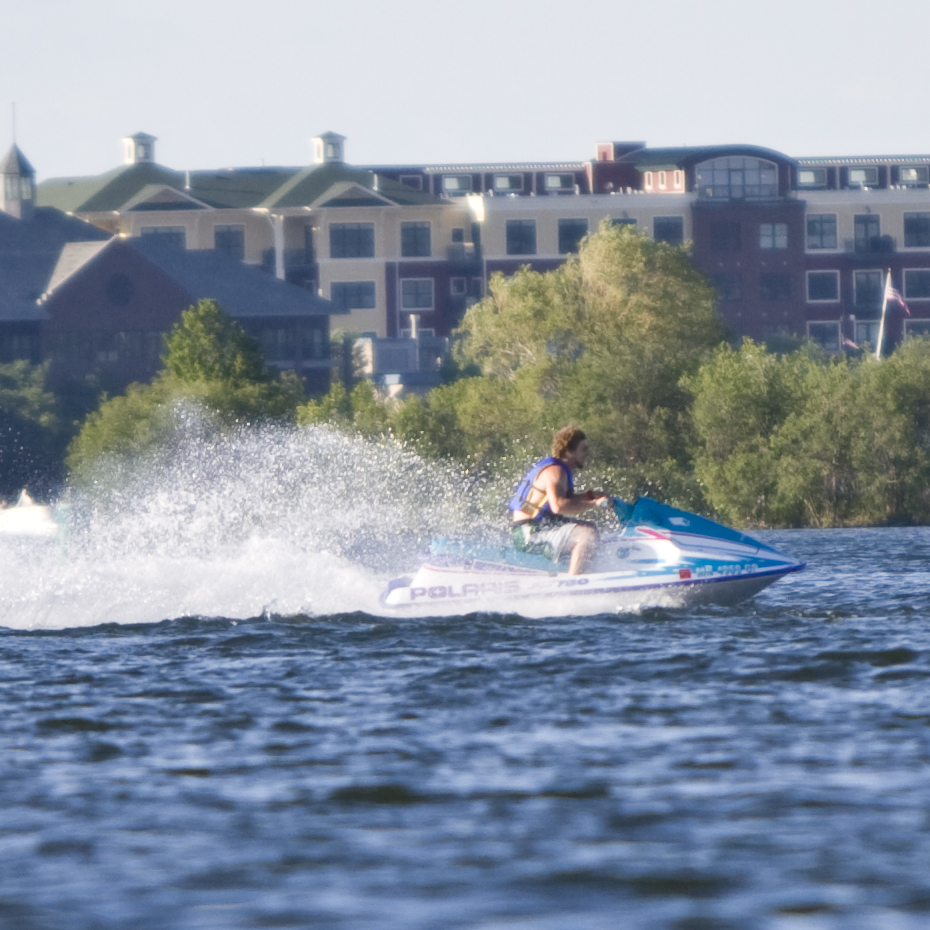
Lake Minnetonka

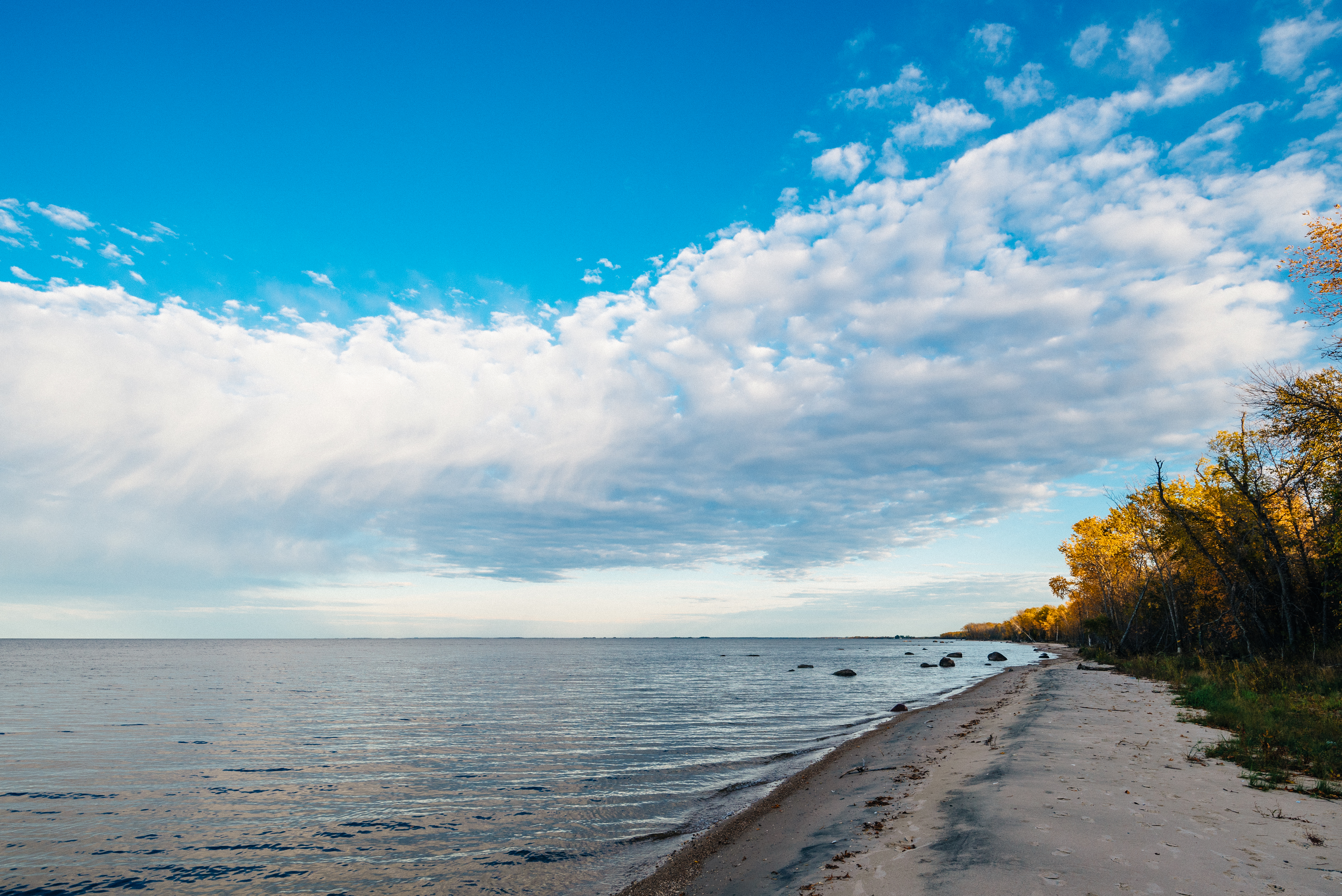
Lake of the Woods

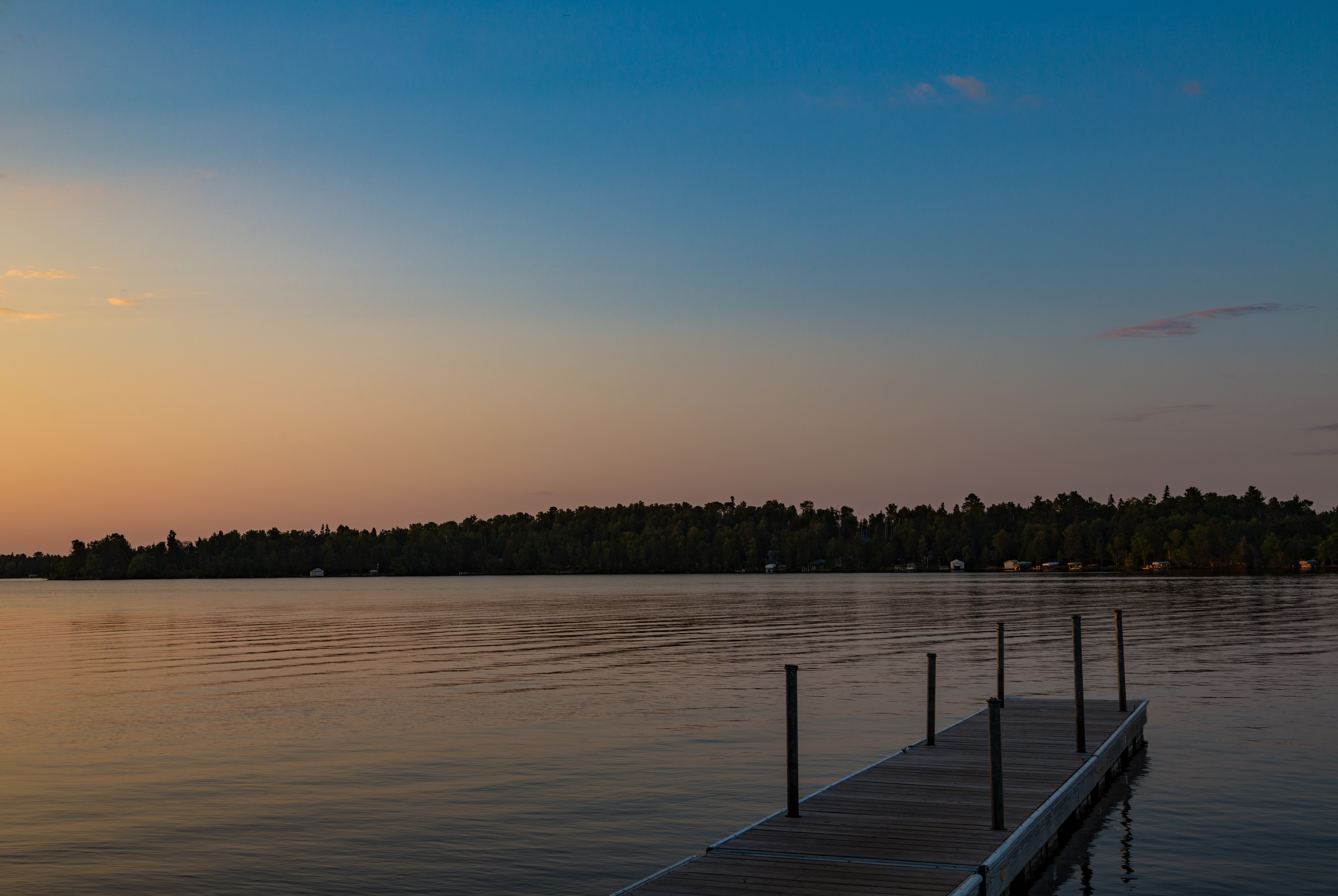
Lake Vermilion

Key
‡ denotes that body of water crosses international border

Name	County	Location	Area (acres)	Littoral zone (acres)	Depth (max) (ft)	Water clarity (ft)	MNDNR Code
Aaron	Douglas	Millerville Township; 46°4′20″N 95°35′5″W	610	467	16	6.8	21024200
Abbey	Becker	Detroit Lakes	269	269	7		
Abbey	Wright	West Albion	26	26		3.6	
Abbie	Wright	Buffalo	117	117	17	1.7	
Abita	Cook	Grand Marais; 47°55′23″N 90°27′21″W	93	93	14	7	
Achman	Stearns	Avon	47	47	30	12	
Acorn	Becker	Frazee	154	51	55	9.4	
Ada	Cass	Backus	974	424	60	15	
Addie	McLeod	Brownton; 44°44′27″N 94°21′49″W	168				
Adelman's Pond	Hennepin	Bloomington	5	5	12	7	
Adley	Otter Tail	Parkers Prairie	239	238	20	2.6	
Agassiz-Oslon WMA	Norman	Flaming	77	77	3	0.7	
Agnes	Douglas	Alexandria	137	61	31	11	
Agnes	St. Louis	Ely	984	453	30	7	
Ahmakose	St. Louis	Prairie Portage	42	9	68	12.8	
Aitkin	Aitkin	Libby	487	453	35	6.3	
Albert	Douglas	Evansville; 45°56′34″N 95°45′42″W	165			3	
Albert	Wright	Buffalo	32	32	7	2.1	
Albert	Wright	Rassat	57	29	47	1.2	
Albert Lea	Freeborn	Albert Lea	2,654	2,654	6	1	24001400
Albion	Wright	Albion Center	240	240	9	2.1	
Alden	St. Louis	Duluth	180	159	29	6.2	
Alexander	Morrison	Randall	2,708	842	64	10.9	49007900
Alexis	Chisago	Ely; 45°37′45″N 93°6′55″W					
Alice	Hubbard	Lake George	127	96	21	5	
Alice	Lake	Ely	1,566	438	53	12	
Alimagnet	Dakota	Apple Valley	103	103	11.5	2.3	
Allen	Clearwater	Lake Itasca					
Allie	Renville	Buffalo Lake	509	509	12	5	
Alma	Pine	Saint Johns Landing Camp	23	23	26	11.8	
Alomestria Pond	Morrison	Pierz					
Alott	Morrison	Fort Ripley	37	32	34	8.6	
Alumni	Stearns	Fairhaven	2	2	5	3	
Altermatt	Brown	Leavenworth Township; 44°11′56″N 94°50′48″W	122		5	2	8005400
Amber	Martin	Fairmont	182	108	19	1.3	
Amelia	Pope	Villard	934	377	69	7	
Amen	Itasca	Deer River	198	107	75	11	
Amiret WMA	Lyon	Amiret	11	11	6	1	
Amos	Douglas	Brandon	88			2	
Amundsen	St. Louis	Kettle Falls	100	77	18	8	
Anchor	St. Louis	Central Lakes	145		5	3	
Anchor Hill 1	Clearwater	Lake Itasca					
Anchor Hill 2	Clearwater	Lake Itasca					
Anchor Hill 3	Clearwater	Lake Itasca					
Anderson	Cook	Tofte Township; 47°47′21″N 90°48′10″W	28				
Anderson	Itasca	Bigfork	274	71	110	9	
Anderson	Renville	Franklin	14	14	8	2	
Andrew	Douglas	Alexandria	923	323	83	7.9	
Andrew	Kandiyohi	New London	759	293	26	12.2	
Andrew Nelson	Meeker	Litchfield	138	138		4.3	
Andrusia	Beltrami	Cass Lake	1,590	423	60	5.5	4003800
Angus	Wright	Maple Lake	66	66	7	4.4	
Ann	Crow Wing	Deerwood	46	26	46	13	
Ann	Carver	Chanhassen	116	45	45	7.5	
Ann	Kanabec	Ogilvie	653	600	17	3.2	
Ann	Pope	Glenwood	356	356	14	6.4	
Ann	Sherburne	Zimmerman	184	138	26	11.5	
Ann	Wright	Howard Lake	375	295	18.5	7.3	
Anna	Crow Wing	Emily	122	102	19	12	
Anna	Otter Tail	Underwood	538	373	55	5.6	
Anna	Stearns	Avon	81	81	27	9	
Annie Battle	Otter Tail	Battle Lake	334	150	51	14.5	
Antler	Itasca	Bigfork	306	76	90	17	
Anway	Cass	Ah-gwah-ching	20	4	45	10	
Apollo Pond	Stearns	Waite Park	4	4	9	6	
Appleby Pool	Winona	Beaver	21	21		3.3	
Arkose	Lake	Prairie Portage	21	7	37	13	
Armstrong	Blue Earth	Butternut	110			3	
Armstrong	St. Louis	Ely	382	102	34	15	
Arthur	Polk	Fertile	120			5	
Artichoke	Big Stone	Correll	1,970	1,970	15.5	3	6000200
Ash (North)	Lincoln	Ivanhoe; 44°25′49″N 96°17′28″W	91			2	
Ash (South)	Lincoln	Ivanhoe; 44°25′23″N 96°17′41″W	142		5	2	
Ash	St. Louis	Orr	669	195	25	8	
Asp	Chisago	Stark	22			8	
Aspinwall	Mahnomen	Beaulieu	363		9	4	
Aspinwall	Becker	Pine Point	140		5	4	
Athens WMA	Isanti	Isanti	41	41	7	3	
Atkinson	Meeker	Cedar Mills	134			2	
Auburn	Carver	Victoria	261	158	37	7.9	
August	Lake	Isabella	228	219	19	7	
Augusta	Cottonwood	Storden	470	470	4	1	
Augusta	Becker	Goldenrod	19	19	12	10	
Augusta	Cottonwood	Stroden	470	470	4	1	
Augusta	Dakota	Mendota	35	35	33	0.9	
Augusta	St. Louis	Central Lakes	75	62	19	6	
Augusta	Otter Tail	Parkers Prairie	70	70	48	3	
Augusta	Stearns	Fairhaven	187	65	88	4.5	
Augusta Pond	Stearns	Fairhaven	4	4	25	8	
Axe	Cook	Lutsen	54	54	12	9.5	
Azalea Pond	Morrison	Fort Ripley					
Azion	Lake	Winton	46	46	5	5	
Baby	Cass	Hackensack	705	248	69	10.2	
Bachelor	Aitkin	Aitkin	53	30	47	12	
Bachelor	Brown	Sleepy Eye; 44°15′22″N 94°39′07″W	92	92	4	3	
Backes	Stearns	Farming	15	15	12	2	
Bad Axe	Hubbard	Emmaville	271	125	39	17	
Bad Medicine	Becker	Ponsford	799	288	84	32	
Badger (North)	Murray	Iona; 43°55′33″N 95°44′04″W	170		3	4	
Badger (South)	Murray	Iona; 43°55′N 95°44′W	190		3	5	
Badger	Polk	Erskine	353	342	19	19	
Bagley	Clearwater	Leonard	94	50	39		
Baker	Cass	Mae	31	31	25	14	
Bakers	Stearns	Sartell	45	45	6	3.3	
Baker's	McLeod	Brownton	311		1.5	1	
Bald Eagle	Ramsey	White Bear Lake	1,268	751	36	2.6	62000200
Baldwin	Anoka	Lino Lakes	188		4.5	3	
Ball Club	Cook	Grand Marais	196	159	25	9	
Ball Club	Itasca	Ball Club	3,936	984	85	12	31081200
Ballantyne	Blue Earth	Madison Lake	350	301	58	3	
Balm	Beltrami	Solway	512	282	33	11	
Balsam	Itasca	Taconite	710	296	37	11	
Ban	St. Louis	Orr	380	380	10	5	
Bane Pond	Morrison	Lastrup					
Bankers	Stearns	Padua	27	27	14	8	
Barker	Cook	Lutsen	149	149	15	3	
Barnes	Carver	Norwood Young America	133			1	
Barnum	Cass	Hackensack	134	84	30	21	
Barrett	Grant	Barrett	544	434	28	5.5	
Barsness	Douglas	Brandon	91			6	
Barthel's Pond	Hennepin	Bloomington	3	3	7	2	
Bartlett	Koochiching	Northome	292	292	16	3.8	
Bass (Big)	Beltrami	Bemidji	380	315	17		
Bass (Little)	Beltrami	Bemidji	343	288	22	15	
Bass	Crow Wing	Merrifield	309	185	24	8	
Bass	Faribault	Delavan	203	171	20	4.5	
Bass	Itasca	Cohasset	2,407	1,254	76	11.4	31057600
Bass	Mahnomen	Waubun	689	294	26	15	
Bass	Morrison	Burtrum	23	23		9.9	
Bass	Morrison	Fort Ripley					
Bass	Morrison	Randall	13	13		6.9	
Bass	Otter Tail	Underwood	292	138	36	12.1	
Bass	Pine	Finlayson	189	148	24	7	
Bass	St. Louis	Soudan	238	231	17	7	
Bass Pond	Cass	Pontoria	2	2	60	7	
Basswood	Lake‡	Ely	14,071	7,034	111	10.7	38064500
Bassett	St. Louis	Fairbanks	442	196	21	7.5	
Battle	Itasca	Effie	243	243	15	11.5	31019700
Battle Creek	Washington	Woodbury	103		14		
Baumbach	Douglas	Brandon	173			1	
Bavaria	Carver	Victoria	162	65	66	5	
Baxter City Hall Pond	Crow Wing	Baxter	4	4	7	2	
Bay	Crow Wing	Deerwood	2,392	1,005	74	14	18003400
Bde Maka Ska	Hennepin	Minneapolis	401	123	82	15	
Beam Pond	Ramsey	Gladstone	13	13	8	5.3	
Bean	Cottonwood	Storden	164	162	12	1.5	
Bean	Lake	Silver Bay	31	16	26	15.7	
Bear	Carlton	Barn Lake Area	91	70	31	8.2	
Bear	Freeborn	Twin Lakes	1,033	1,033	6		
Bear	Itasca	Nashwauk	339	268	16	3.5	
Bear	Otter Tail	Perham	181	120	32	7.6	
Bear	Stearns	St. Anthony	35	35	12	5	
Bear Creek Reservoir	Olmsted	Chester	104	104	37	18.5	
Bear Head	St. Louis	Tower	674	371	46	12	
Bear Island	St. Louis	Babbitt	2,351	879	62	10	
Bearskin	Cook	Grand Marais	509	94	78	20	
Beast	St. Louis	Kabetogama	85	47	66	15	
Beatty	Sibley	Gaylord	78	0		1	
Beaulieu	Mahnomen	Bejou	261		5	3	
Beautiful	Stearns	St. Rosa	29	29	34	12	
Beauty	Itasca	Goodland	217	152	31	9	
Beauty	Morrison	Flensburg	23	23		3.1	
Beauty	Todd	Long Prairie	237	137	27	8	
Beaver	St. Louis	Buhl	16				
Beaver	Stearns	Luxemberg	152	49	27	7	
Beaver 1	Stearns	St. Augusta	24	24	12	9	
Beaver 2	Stearns	St. Augusta	9	9	7	3	
Beaver Dam	Wright	Dassel	56	56		3.7	
Beaver Pond	Stearns	St. Augusta	13	13	7	4	
Beckendorf Pond	Renville	Delhi	6	6	6	3	
Becker	Stearns	Richmond	221	170	20	5.5	
Becker Pond	Sherburne	Santiago					
Becker Sewage	Sherburne	Clear Lake	25	25		4.4	
Bee Cee	Itasca	Grand Rapids	29	18	33	6.5	
Bee Tree	Todd	Lincoln	22	22	14	6	
Beebe	Otter Tail	Dalton	69			5	
Beebe	Wright	St. Michael	322	135	27	6	
Beers	Otter Tail	Pelican Rapids	195	96	61	14.5	
Belgrade Pond	Stearns	Belgrade	16	16	2	2	
Belle	Meeker	Strout	149	149		2.3	
Belle	Meeker	Hutchinson	826	383	25	2.8	
Belle Taine	Hubbard	Nevis	1,185	771	56	14	
Bello	Itasca	Marcell	493	251	58		
Belmont	Otter Tail	Clitherall	192	108	34	11.8	
Beltrami	Beltrami	Bemidji	543	300	50	11	
Bemidji	Beltrami	Bemidji	6,420	1,862	76	6	
Benedict	Hubbard	Benedict	440	172	91	14	
Benedict Pit	Clay	Sabin	26	26	165	52.8	
Bennett	Ramsey	Roseville	29	28	9	3	
Benton	Lincoln	Lake Benton	2,857	2,857	9	1.6	
Benton	Meeker	Casey	34	34	14	6	
Benz	Washington	Withrow	32	32	14	5.1	
Berg	St. Louis	Melrude	151	151	10	4	
Berliner	Carver	Mayer	46			3	
Bernhart	Morrison	Lincoln	30	30		6.8	
Bertha	Crow Wing	Jenkins	334	142	64	10.5	
Bertram	Wright	Monticello	110	23	44	8	
Beseau	Becker	Lake Park	226	120	27	12	
Beulah Pond	Sherburne	Big Lake					
Bible	Aitkin	Hill City	19	11	45	10.4	
Bible's Duck Slough	Benton	Duelm					
Big	Beltrami	Bemidji	3,533	2,106	35	13	
Big	Carlton	Sawyer	507	440	25	13.5	
Big	Grant	Herman	285			2	
Big	St. Louis	Ely	1,789	1,514	22	7	
Big	St. Louis	Hoyt Lakes	805	379	30	9	
Big	Sherburne	Big Lake	251	110	48	9.5	
Big	Stearns	Richmond	18	18	15	8.9	
Big	Stearns	Richmond	403	227	42	4.8	
Big	Todd	Cushing	277	166	21	7.2	
Big Birch	Todd	Grey Eagle	2,107	642	81	6	
Big Carnelian	Washington	Stillwater	464	131	66	9	
Big Diamond	Itasca	Marble	122	61	31	17	
Big Dick	Itasca	Marcell	249	152	20	10	
Big Fish	Stearns	Cold Spring	558	201	70	14.8	
Big Island	Itasca	Marcell	238	202	42	14.5	
Big Kandiyohi	Kandiyohi	Lake Lillian	2,692	2,692	15	2.8	34008600
Big Logan	Aitkin	Hassman	33	33	13	3	
Big Marine	Washington	Forest Lake	1,756	1,152	60	9	
Big McDonald 2	Otter Tail	Dent	489	295	33	13.6	
Big Moose	Beltrami	Pennington	568	241	71	13	
Big Moose	St. Louis	Ely	1,032	1,012	23		
Big Mud	Sherburne	Orrock	224	224		3.7	
Big Ole	Itasca	Marcell	179	84	65	15.5	
Big Pine	Isanti	Spring Lake	16			5	
Big Pine	Pine	Finlayson	387	135	25	9.5	
Big Portage	Cass	Backus	918	901	23	7.2	
Big Rabbit (East)	Crow Wing	Cuyuna	638	242	337	16	
Big Rabbit (West)	Crow Wing	Cuyuna	531	165	50	13	
Big Rice	Cass	Remer	2,832	2,832	5	5	
Big Rice	St. Louis	Ely	420	420	5	2	
Big Rice	Stearns	Farming	180	180	18	4	
Big Rush	Becker	Ponsford	917	917	9	6.5	
Big Sand	Hubbard	Park Rapids	1,635	465	135	25	
Big Sandy	Aitkin	McGregor	6,526	3,067	84	5	
Big Spunk	Stearns	Avon	440	150	38	10	
Big Stone	Big Stone	Ortonville	12,610	12,484	16	14.7	6015200
Big Stone NWR East Pool	Lac qui Parle	Correll	1,286	1,286	42	2	
Big Stoney	Hubbard	Park Rapids	319	223	24	4	
Big Sucker	Itasca	Nashwauk	230	138	36	5	
Big Sugar Bush	Becker	Richwood	522	297	42	16	
Big Swan	Meeker	Kingston	628	338	32	4.1	
Big Swan	Todd	Burtrum	918	404	45	5	
Big Too Much	Itasca	Talmoon	232	56	95	13	
Big Trout	Crow Wing	Cross Lake	1,342	369	128	11	
Big Watab	Stearns	Avon	227	46	123	10	
Big Wolf	Beltrami	Bemidji	1,094	390	57	9.5	
Bingham	Cottonwood	Bingham Lake	259	259	10	6	
Birch	Aitkin	Aitkin	421	421	8	3	
Birch	Becker	Callaway	233		25	5	
Birch	Cass	Hackensack	1,284	755	45	7.7	
Birch	Cass	Remer	255	51	30	10	
Birch	Lake	Ely	711	342	34	9	
Birch	Meeker	Casey	85	85		4.9	
Birch	Sherburne	Big Lake	158	117	18	2.5	
Birch	St. Louis	Babbitt	5,628	1,060	25	4	69000300
Birch	Wright	Buffalo	98	63	26	6.1	
Birch	Wright	Monticello	99	37	52	11	
Birch Pond	Stearns	Spaulding	7	7	12	2	
Birch (Big)	Todd	Grey Eagle	2,108	642	81	4.2	
Birch (Little)	Todd	Grey Eagle	838	277	89	4.5	
Black	Beltrami	Turtle River	246	125	42		
Black	Crow Wing	Deerwood	106	38	47	12	
Black	Wright	Buffalo	97	81	50	5.5	
Black	Wright	Enfield	38	38		4.9	
Black Dog	Dakota	Burnsville	275			1	
Black Duck	St. Louis	Orr	1,185	498	30	10.5	
Black Oak	Stearns	New Munich	98	112	19	3.5	
Black Oak	Stearns	Melrose	101	101	24	14	
Black Shadow	Aitkin	Aitkin	22	6	60	10	
Blackduck	Beltrami	Blackduck	2,596	1,374	28	3	
Blackface	Aitkin	Ball Bluff	191	170	18	10.5	
Blackhawk	Dakota	Eagan	40	47	12	8	
Blacks	Sherburne	Big Lake	17	17		5.7	
Blackwater	Cass	Longville	722	336	67	13.7	
Blackwater	Itasca	Cohasset	719	633	72	9.4	
Blackwell	Douglas	Holmes City	307	199	42	11	
Bladder	Hubbard	Nevis	223		3.5	2	
Blanche	Otter Tail	Ottertail	1,268	1,002	64	9	
Blandin	Itasca	Grand Rapids	449	366	38	15	
Blind	Aitkin	Aitkin	370	359	17	6	
Block	Otter Tail	Urbank	263	132	23	5.8	
Bloody	Murray	Currie	248	248	9	1	
Bloom	Itasca	Marcell	34		30	12	
Bloom's	Chisago	Shafer	148			7	
Blue	Aitkin	Aitkin	53	14	106	9	
Blue	Houston	La Crescent	475	475	14	4	
Blue	Hubbard	Park Rapids	324	81	84	27	
Blue	Isanti	Princeton	309	134	31	5	
Blueberry	Wadena	Menahga	522	522	15	4.5	
Bluewater	Itasca	Grand Rapids	364	72	120	14.5	
Boedigheimer	Otter Tail	Richville	176	93	26	13.5	
Bohall	Clearwater	Lake Itasca	23			11	
Bolfing	Stearns	Cold Spring	108	70	36	3.7	
Bone	Washington	Forest Lake	210	124	30	9.5	
Bonnie	Crow Wing	Merrifield	76	39	42	13	
Boo	Meeker	Dassel	37	37		1.7	
Boomerang	Morrison	Randall					
Boomerang	Morrison	Fort Ripley					
Boot	Aitkin	Ball Bluff	79	39	67	7.5	
Boot	Anoka	Linwood	91	0	19	4	
Boot	Becker	Two Inlets	348	81	109	16	
Boot	Cass	Mildred	47	47	14	5	
Boot	Jackson	Lakefield	151		6	1	
Boot	Lake	Prairie Portage	197	134	83	19	
Boot	St. Louis	Kabetogama	51	51	25	12	
Boot	St. Louis	Winton	322	163	27	9	
Booth Pond	Wright	Rockford					
Bootleg	Beltrami	Bemidji	332	203	30	8.5	
Botkers	Big Stone	Graceville	44	36	18.5	5.3	
Borden	Crow Wing	Garrison	957	304	84	9	
Borer	Le Sueur	Montgomery	37			1	
Bouder	Cook	Grand Marais	136	133	17		
Boulder	St. Louis	Duluth	3,259	3,206	18	5.8	69037300
Boulder	Hubbard	Dorset	360	180	28	9.5	
Bowstring	Itasca	Deer River	9,220	4,736	32	6	
Boy	Cass	Boy River	3,186	2,007	45	6.5	
Boyd	Sherburne	Santiago	102	102		5.5	
Boyer	Becker	Lake Park	310	204	26	5.5	
Brand	Carver	Norwood Young America	68			3	
Brandon	Douglas	Holmes City	51			8	
Brawner	Lyon	Russell	29	20	18	5.2	
Brenner	Kandiyohi	Sunburg	81			7	
Brickyard Clayhole	Carver	Chaska	17	6	43	10.2	
Briggs	Sherburne	Clear Lake	404	170	25	3	
Brockway Slough	Stearns	St. Stephen	212	212	10	5	
Brooks	Wright	Cokato	100	58	21	3	
Brophy	Douglas	Alexandria	289	150	44	11.5	
Brouhaha	Morrison	Harding					
Brownie	Hennepin	Minneapolis; 44°58′03″N 93°19′28″W	18		49		
Brownie Pond	Morrison	Bowlus					
Browns	Lake	Ely	205	170	19	12	
Brule	Cook	Grand Marais	4,617	1,431	78	15	16034800
Bryant	Hennepin	Eden Prairie	161	64	45	5.4	
BSNWR West Pool	Lac qui Parle	Odessa	1,479	1,479	24	3	
Buchanan	Otter Tail	Ottertail	929	835	42	11	
Buck	Beltrami	Cass Lake	271	68	40	16	
Buck	Itasca	Nashwauk	492	180	31	8	
Buckeye Pit	Itasca		48	48	80	19	
Buckman	Itasca	Marcell	228		10	6	
Bucks	Sherburne	Big Lake	15	15		7.1	
Budd	Clearwater	Lake Itasca					
Budd	Martin	Fairmont	228	111	23	3	
Buffalo	Becker	Richwood	376	192	38		
Buffalo	Murray	Dovray	124	124	8.5	1.3	
Buffalo	Wright	Buffalo	1,552	760	33	2	
Buffalo Marsh	Murray	Dovray	51	51	5	1.3	
Buffalo Slough	Goodhue	Etter	26	26	7	2	
Bulge	Cook	Lutsen	11	11	8	8	
Bullfrog	Lake	Ely	62	43	26	10	
Bullhead	Morrison	Little Falls					
Bullhead	Otter Tail	Clitherall	65		8	2	
Bullhead	Watonwan	St. James	80			4	
Bunt	Stearns	Clearwater	109	109	12	3.8	
Burandt	Carver	Waconia	97	67	24	3.5	
Burgan	Douglas	Alexandria	174	47	43	5	
Burnt Shanty	Itasca	Marcell	182	127	35	10.5	
Burntside	St. Louis	Ely	7,139	1,478	126	20	69011800
Burns Pit	St. Louis	Eveleth	20	20	95	18	
Burr Oak	Kandiyohi	Kandiyohi	27	27	16	8	
Burrows	Itasca	Marcell	291	227	38	12	
Bush	Hennepin	Bloomington	172	110	28	16.8	
Busties	Itasca	Holyoke	237	71	44		
Butler	Wright	Oster	129	129		1.7	
Butternut	Crow Wing	Bay Lake	26	21	34	10	
Butternut	Meeker	Dassel	83	83	12	4.5	
Butternut	Wright	Rice Lake	121			2	
Button Box	Itasca	Togo	81	68	18	11	
Buzzle	Beltrami	Pinewood	202	43	83	14	
Byer	Stearns	Cold Spring	134	134	17	12	
Byer Pond	Stearns	Cold Spring	9	9	8	5	
Byllesby	Dakota	Cannon Falls	1,435	976	50	2.6	
Byron	Meeker	Lamson	349	349		2.7	
Cadotte	St. Louis	Fairbanks	325	230	18	12	
Calhoun	Kandiyohi	Spicer	618	618	13	5.7	
Cameron	Polk	Erskine	224	224	9		
Cameron	St. Louis	Cotton	162	81	27	6.5	
Camile	Morrison	Randall	28	28		9.2	
Camp	Crow Wing	Pine Center	478	206	42	6	
Camp	Sherburne	Clear Lake	77	55	34	10	
Camp	Swift	Swift Falls	203	97	26	3.8	
Camp	Wright	Maple Lake	122	41	20	3	
Campbell	Beltrami	Puposky	475	222	25		
Campbell	Carver and McLead	Winsted	70			0.7	
Candle	St. Louis	Buhl	10	10	12		
Canisteo Pit	Itasca	Coleraine	40	130	311	29	
Cannon	Goodhue	Red Wing	80	80	8	6.5	
Cannon	Rice	Faribault	1,591	1,591	15	2	
Cannon River Reservoir	Rice	Faribault	57	57	35	3	
Cantlin	Sherburne	Lake Fremont	117	117		4.4	
Canton	Morrison	Cushing					
Canton Pit	St. Louis	Biwabik	250	13	100	13	
Captain Luke	Itasca	Bigfork	30	30	32	14.2	
Capote	Lake		17	17	12	8.2	
Carey	St. Louis	Hibbing	139	139	13.5	5	
Caribou	Cook	Lutsen	728	439	30	8.5	
Caribou	Cook	Grand Marais	255	204	26	7	
Caribou	Itasca	Marcell	240	45	152	28	
Carlos	Douglas	Alexandria	2,520	910	163	11	21005700
Carlton	Chippewa	Montevideo	28	28	24	3	
Carlz Pit	Itasca	Keewatin	89	89	155	17.3	
Carman	Becker	Elbow Lake Village	116	116	12	4.6	
Carnation Pond	Morrison	Harding					
Carnelian Island Slough	Stearns	Maine Prairie	24	24	16	7	
Carnelian	Stearns	Kimball	164	63	39	11	
Carrigan	Wright	Waverly	149	149		1.9	
Carter	Beltrami	Tenstrike	31	18	69	12	
Carter	Sherburne	Clear Lake	29	29		4.9	
Carter	Stearns	Watkins	26	26	16	3	
Carver	Washington	Woodbury	50	25	36	3	
Cascade	Cook	Lutsen	415	415	17	8	
Cascade	Crow Wing	Deerwood	44	37	24	11	
Cascade	Olmsted	Rochester	78	78	74	27	
Casey	Crow Wing	Cuyuna	59	45	39	10	
Cass	Beltrami	Cass Lake	15,596	3,119	120		4003000
Cassidy	Wright	Silver Creek	15	9	37		
Cass County Lake	Todd	Lincoln	25	25	12	1	
Cat	Lake	Isabella	43	33	21	11.7	
Cattyman	Lake	Prairie Portage	16	16	9	7.5	
Cavanaugh	Itasca	Cohasset	67	44	48	14	
Cavanaugh	Hennepin	Oak Knoll	13	13	9	3	
Cedar	Aitkin	Aitkin	1,769	405	105	5.8	
Cedar	Aitkin	McGrath	232	215	18	2.5	
Cedar	Rice	Faribault	804	673	42	2	
Cedar	Hennepin	Minneapolis	169	63	51	5.5	
Cedar	Martin	Trimont	707	707	7	2	
Cedar	McLeod	Cedar Mills	1,924	1,924	8	5.8	
Cedar	Morrison	Upsala	235	66	88	16.1	
Cedar	Scott	New Prague	780	780	13	3.1	
Cedar	Stearns	Sauk Centre	169	169	16	3	
Cedar	Wright	Delano					
Cedar	Wright	Monticello	163	131	47	15.5	
Cedar Island	St. Louis	Biwabik	185	176	20	3	
Cedar Island	Stearns	Richmond	998	755	75	2.3	
Cemetery Pond	Hennepin	Nicols	3	3	8	6	
Center (North)	Chisago	Center City	725	608	46	1.7	
Center (South)	Chisago	Lindstrom	835	561	109	3.6	
Centerville	Anoka	Centerville	455	276	19	3.2	
Chandler Marsh	Murray	Chandler	58	58	6	1.3	
Charlotte	Wright	Hanover	252	94	46	15.8	
Chase	Itasca	Deer River	209	68	95	20.5	
Chelgren	Wright	Stockholm	53	37	24	2.4	
Chicken	Meeker	Litchfield	116	116		3.9	
Chicken Drop Marsh	Clay	Dale					
Child	Cass	Longville	316	158	29	10	
Chippewa (Big)	Douglas	Brandon	1,186	505	95	7	
Chippewa (Little)	Douglas	Brandon	270	126	24	9	
Chisago City	Chisago	Chisago	873	695	34		
Christianson Marsh	Lyon	Amiret	22	22	4	1.5	
Christina	Douglas	Ashby	3,978	3,978	14		21037500
Christmas	Hennepin	Eden Prairie	257	77	87	18.8	
Christmas	Morrison	Hillman	29	29		7.0	
Chub	Carlton	Carlton	311	169	28	7.2	
Chub	Dakota	Farmington	274	274	10		
Chub	St. Louis	Ash Lake	125	125	15	6	
Church	Mahnomen	Mahnomen	167	161	19	1.9	
Circle	Rice	Lonsdale	624	624	14		
Clark	Crow Wing	Nisswa	305	264	31	15	
Clark	Lake	McNair	51	51	4	2	
Clark	St. Louis	Ely	73	24	44	12	
Clark Logan	Aitkin	Hassman	34	34	10		
Clarke	Itasca	Cohasset	37	27	34	12	
Clear	Aitkin	Glen	562	363	24	15.5	
Clear	Brown	Sleepy Eye	263	59	21		
Clear	Crow Wing	Jenkins	220	59	63	19	
Clear	Goodhue	Hastings	198	392	7		
Clear	Jackson	Jackson	415	415	9	2.2	
Clear	Lyon	Russell	65	68	11	1	
Clear	Le Sueur	Lexington	268	198	18	2.3	
Clear	Meeker	Watkins	497	441	18	1.5	
Clear	Otter Tail	Dalton	352	153	29	8.1	
Clear	Sherburne	Clearwater	112	50	30	11	
Clear	Sibley	Gibbon	469	469	8		
Clear	St. Louis	Ely	119	97	24	11	
Clear	St. Louis	Buhl	112	94	24	10.5	
Clear	Waseca	Waseca	652	448	34		
Clear	Washington	Forest Lake	424	267	28	4.5	
Clear	Washington	Maple Island	41	29	27	8.5	
Clear	Washington	Woodbury					
Cleary	Scott						
Clear Lake City Pond	Sherburne	Clear Lake	175	175		5.0	
Clear Pond	Sherburne	Clear Lake					
Clearwater	Beltrami	Leonard	1,008	339	65	10.5	
Clearwater	Crow Wing	Deerwood	880	252	54	14	
Clearwater	Wright	Annandale	3,158	1,595	78	4.5	86025200
Clinker	Crow Wing	Crosby	80	43	35	12	
Clitherall	Otter Tail	Dalton	2,493	805	69	9.3	
Clitty	Sherburne	Becker	26	26		4.2	
Clover Hill	Crow Wing	Saint Mathias					
Clubhouse	Itasca	Marcell	210	32	103	17	
Cobblecrest	Hennepin	Oak Knoll	9	9	20	10	
Cockburn	Morrison	Fort Ripley	22	22	21	8.8	
Cody	Rice	Montgomery	257	257	14	0.7	
Cokato	Wright	Cokato	552	184	52	3.6	
Colby	St. Louis	Hoyt Lakes	539	377	30	4	
Colby	Washington	Woodbury	70		11		
Cold Spring Dam Pool	Stearns	Cold Spring	77	77	12	3	
Coleman	Itasca	Rosy	46	46		4.9	
Collins	Meeker	Lamson	67	67		4.7	
Collinwood	Meeker	Dassel	638	351	28	3.1	
Comfort	Chisago	Wyoming	219	90	47	3.8	
Command	Crow Wing	Fifty Lakes	21	21		19	
Como	Ramsey	St. Paul	66	66	15.5	1.5	
Comstock	St. Louis	Whiteface	443	310	30	4	
Conger's Slough	Lyon	Taunton	78	78	9	3.3	
Conley	Dakota	Hastings	77	77	9	3	
Constance	Wright	Buffalo	174	87	23	5	
Coofie Marsh	Morrison	Lincoln	23	23		6.9	
Cook	Douglas	Alexandria	95	66	50	12	
Cook	Hennepin	Corcoran	9	9	20	12	
Cook	Wright	Delano	105	105		2.1	
Cook County Lake	Lake	Prairie Portage	43	43	38	10.3	
Cooks	Otter Tail	Bucks Mill	60	44	44	4.5	
Cooks	St. Louis	Taft	96	90	19	8	
Cookoosh	Lake	Fall Lake Twp.	11	11	22	11	
Coon	Anoka	Soderville	1,259	1,098	27	6.7	
Coon	Itasca	Big Fork	627	504	36	11.4	
Coon	Morrison	Buckman					
Coon	Morrison	Burtrum	42	42		6.5	
Coon Stump	Morrison	Fort Ripley					
Coopers	Anoka	East Bethel	44	44	8		
Corabelle	Murray						
Cormorant (Big)	Becker	Audubon	3,421	812	75	10	
Cormorant (Little)	Becker	Audubon	924	619	34	11.5	
Cornell	Wright	Hasty	29	29		7.5	
Corner	Morrison	Lincoln					
Corner Pond	Stearns	Avon	3	3	8	4	
Cotton	Becker	Rochert	1,720	781	28	13.5	
Cottonwood	Grant	Donnelly	243	243	16	8	
Cottonwood	Lyon	Cottonwood	323	323	7	2.3	
Cowdry	Douglas	Alexandria	238	88	52	9.5	
Cow Horn Lake	Itasca						
CP Adams Pond	Dakota	Hastings	20	20	12	2.5	
Crab Lake	St. Louis	Ely	544	544	57	6	
Crane	Hennepin	Oak Knoll	39	39	14	6	
Crane	Otter Tail	Battle Lake	367	202	43	11	
Crane	St. Louis	Crane Lake	3,088	618	80	7.5	69061600
Crawford	Wright	Montrose	110	107	19	14	
Crescent	Cook	Grand Marais	744	558	28	11	
Crescent	Sherburne	Clear Lake	50	50		2.4	
Crescent 1 Pond	Sherburne	Clear Lake					
Crescent 2 Pond	Sherburne	Clear Lake					
Crew Pond	Morrison	Lincoln					
Crooked	Itasca	Marble	418	104	60	3.1	
Crooked	Stearns	Clearwater	77	36	35	14	
Crooked Pond	Stearns	Clearwater	8	8	12	5	
Crookneck	Morrison	Lincoln	179	131	22	12.8	
Cross	Crow Wing	Cross Lake	1,751	879	84	12	
Cross	Pine	Pine City	943	507	30	4	
Cross	Polk	Fosston	328	303	19	7	
Crossways	Anoka	Centerville	356	356		6.9	
Crow	Cook	Brooten	600	560	30	8	
Crow	Stearns	Belgrade	279	279	9	3	
Crow Wing	Crow Wing	Ft Ripley	382	210	26	7	
Cruiser	St. Louis	Ray	115	22	91	27	
Crystal	Dakota	Burnsville	280	208	37	2.8	
Crystal	Hennepin	Robbinsdale	79	53	39		
Crystal	Otter Tail	Pelican Rapids	1,412	674	55	6.8	
Crystal	Stevens	Morris	185	185	20+		
Cullen (Lower)	Crow Wing	Nisswa	512	180	39	11	
Cullen (Middle)	Crow Wing	Nisswa	382	127	48	14.5	
Cullen (Upper)	Crow Wing	Nisswa	435	300	40	16	
Cummings	Redwood	Delhi	4	4	14	7	
Curfman	Becker	Shoreham	120	85	24	6.9	
Current	Murray	Balaton	377	377	9.5	0.9	
Current Lake Marsh	Murray	Balaton	56	56	11	1.6	
Cut Foot Sioux	Itasca	Squaw Lake	2,768	1,324	78	12.2	
Cut-Off	Itasca	Cohasset	28	28	4	2	
Cutaway	Itasca	Bovey	257	98	55	12	
Dago	Pine	Willow River	107	107	20	11	
Dahlgren Slough	Wright	Cokato					
Dallas	Stearns	Clearwater	20	16	22	5.5	
Dam	Aitkin	Aitkin	642	256	48	10.5	
Dane	Otter Tail						
Daniel	Clearwater	Shevlin	56	56	27	10.8	
Daniels	Cook	Grand Marais	508	86	90	18.5	
Danielson Slough	Pope	Cyrus	36	36	9	0.7	
Danzel Slough	Sherburne	Orrock	16	16		2.7	
Dark	Koochiching	Gemmell	119	70	50	6	
Dark	St. Louis	Buhl	232	138	31	17	
Dark	St. Louis	Winton	38	38	10	5	
Darling	Douglas	Alexandria	954	477	62	9	
Darwin	Meeker	Darwin	171	171		4	
Davenport	Stearns	Sartell	8	8	7	2	
Davis (Main Bay)	Aitkin	McGregor	76	18	32	4.3	
Davis	Renville	Morton	13	13	15	5	
Days	Stearns	Kimball	31	31	24	6	
Dayton Hollow Reservoir	Otter Tail	Fergus Falls	227	139	32	6	
Dead	Becker	Frazee	274	249	19	1.8	
Dead	Hubbard	Dorset	292	172	34	16	
Dead	Otter Tail	Dent	7,901	6,537	65	4.8	
Deadman	Otter Tail	Pelican Township	83	83	7	1	
Dead Coon	Lincoln	Arco	569	569	9	2.5	
Dean	Wright	Buffalo	175	125	20	3.5	
Deep	Stearns	Richmond	54	12	54	14	
Deer	Aitkin	Malmo	45	45	11	4.3	
Deer	Beltrami	Bemidji	262	118	42		
Deer	Itasca	Deer River	4,097	920	121	9.5	
Deer	Itasca	Effie	1,748	1,332	50	10.5	
Deer	Morrison	Fort Ripley					
Deer	Otter Tail	Battle Lake	457	306	26	9.5	
Deer	Wright	Buffalo	171	126	27	4.5	
Deer Pond	Washington	Lake Elmo	7	6	9	4	
Del Clark	Yellow Medicine	Canby	156	88	30	5.1	
De Montreville	Washington	Lake Elmo	143	129	24	12	
Denger	Morrison	Lastrup	26	26		5.2	
Detroit	Becker	Detroit Lakes	3,083	1,895	89	7.3	3038100
Dettmans	McLeod	Jennie	33	33	8	2.6	
Devil Track	Cook	Grand Marais	1,838	626	50		
Devils	Douglas	Brandon	221	150	35	7.5	
Devils	Otter Tail	Perham	314	211	67	13.2	
Devine	St. Louis	Rollins	20	20	9	5.3	
Dewey	St. Louis	Chisholm	195	76	40	11	
Dewitt Marsh	Mille Lacs	Warman	90	90	9	5.9	
Diamond	Hennepin	Minneapolis	115	115	6	4	
Diamond	Hennepin	Rogers	408	406	8		
Diamond Pond	Cass	Hackensack	4	4	6	3	
Diamond	Kandiyohi	Atwater	1,565	635	27	3	
Diann	Sherburne	Lake Fremont	81	81	8	5.9	
Dickey's	Hennepin	Long Lake	12	7	26		
Dickman	Dakota	Sunfish Lake	24	24	13	2	
Dinham	St. Louis	Melrude	207	132	25	3.5	
Dinner Pail	Itasca	Hill City	47	21	30	9	
Dixon	Itasca	Squaw Lake	616	478	29	5.5	
Dodd's Quarry #20	Sherburne	St. Cloud					
Doefler	Wright	Highland	89	89		2.0	
Dog	Wright	Oster	96	73	25	2.5	
Dogfish	Aitkin	Aitkin	34	9	85	2	
Dolney	Crow Wing	Emily	271	268	16	11	
Donora Settling Basin	St. Louis	Ridge	110	110	140	36	
Dora	Itasca	Wirt	447	422	18	8.7	
Doran	Clay	Hawley	112		7	2.5	
Double	Cottonwood	Storden	246	246	9	2	
Dovre	St. Louis	Crane Lake	120	114	17	5	
Dower	Todd						
Duck	Hubbard	Hubbard	326	151	23	5.5	
Duck Pond	Sherburne	Orrock					
Duffy	Sherburne	Orrock	8	8		2.4	
Dugout Pond	Sherburne	Crown					
Dumbbell	Lake	Isabella	437	202	40	22	
Dummer	Aitkin	Bennettville	31	27	33	8	
Dunbar	Itasca	Squaw Lake	254	162	30	5	
Dunder Pond	Morrison	Upsala	28	28	10	4.8	
Durgin Slough	Sherburne	Orrock					
Dutch	Hennepin	Mound	160	83	45	2.3	
Dutch	Wright	Howard Lake	153	112	21	2.3	
Dutchman	Beltrami	Hines	171	171	6	1.6	
Dutchman	Cook	Grand Portage	46	46	16	6.9	
Dynamite Pond	Stearns	Eden Valley					
Eagle	Becker	Frazee	308	141	29	7.2	
Eagle	Blue Earth	Madison Lake	914	914	9	1.5	
Eagle	Crow Wing	Deerwood	239	65	44	4.9	
Eagle	Crow Wing	Fifty Lakes	358	190	36	15.8	
Eagle	Hennepin	Maple Grove	291	199	34	4.3	
Eagle	Hubbard	Park Rapids	411	164	77	9	
Eagle	Itasca	Marcell	279	209	47		
Eagle	Kandiyohi	Willmar	824	274	67	8.5	
Eagle	Otter Tail	Battle Lake	845	157	46	22.6	
Eagle	Sherburne	Big Lake	462	330	18	2	
Eagle	Sherburne	Elk River	5	5		4.5	
Eagle	Stearns	Richmond	37	37	7	4	
Eagle	Wright	Maple Lake	190	169	38	4.2	
Eagle Point	Washington						
Eagles Nest 1	St. Louis	Ely	322	88	76	19	
Eagles Nest 2	St. Louis	Ely	408	229	39	14	
Eagles Nest 3	St. Louis	Soudan	1,001	553	49	18	
Eagles Nest 4	St. Louis	Ely	177	83	49	18	
Earley	Dakota	Burnsville	23	23	8	8	19003300
East	Stearns	Richmond	242	242	9	4	
East Battle	Otter Tail	Henning	1,949	825	87	7.7	56013800
East Chub	Lake	Isabella	64	64	9		
East Crooked	Hubbard	Nevis	365	120	96	17.5	
East Gemini	Stearns	Collegeville	62	62	11	4	
East Hunter	Sherburne	Crown	56	54	7	5.5	
East Jefferson	Le Sueur	Cleveland	700	343	37	4	
East Leaf	Otter Tail	Henning	404	113	47	8	
East Lost	Otter Tail	Battle Lake	501	327	36	10.2	
East Mahnomen	Crow Wing	Trommald	81	81	10	9.8	
East Murray Island	Stearns	Kimball; 45°20′27″N 94°17′39″W	23	23	28	2.6	
East Nelson	Morrison	Motley			5		
East Niemaki	Grant	Herman	177	177	7	3	
East Park WMA	Marshall	Strandquist	405	405	12	11.9	
East Pipe	Cook	Lutsen	105	105	12	4.5	
East Pope	Cook	Grand Marais	35	19	28	10.3	
East Side	Mower	Austin	39	39	10	2	
East Robinson	St. Louis	Robinson	26	26	5	3.9	
East Silent	Otter Tail	Dent	310	58	48	16	
East Soloman	Kandiyohi	Willmar	706	706	14	12	
East Thomas	Dakota	Eagan	10	10	9	3.9	
East Toqua	Big Stone	Graceville	436	428	9	1.3	
East Twin	Lyon	Florence	352	224	22	3.2	
East Twin	Morrison	Flensburg	18	18		5.1	
East Twin	Wright	Monticello	21	21	12	4.5	
East & West Stephens Settling Basin	St. Louis	Ridge	275	275	132	33	
Echo	Washington	Pine Springs	28	28	14	4.9	
Eden	Stearns	Eden Valley	263	124	77	5.5	
Eden Slough	Stearns	Marty	25	25	8	5	
Edith	Cook	Grand Marais	10	10	44	8.5	
Edmund	Itasca	Marcell	50		12	1.9	
Edna	Otter Tail	Butler	115	115	8	2.3	
Edward	Crow Wing	Merrifield	2,576	1,198	75	12	
Edward	Wright	West Albion	96	96	10	3.3	
Eight	Kandiyohi						
Eighth Crow Wing	Hubbard	Nevis; 46°57′36″N 94°47′44″W	492	153	30		
Eighty Acre	Meeker	Dassel	36	36	10	5	
Eilers	Sherburne	Clear Lake	25	25		4.2	
Elbow	Becker	Waubun	1,001	200	76	15	
Elbow	Cook	Grand Marais	437	437	9	4.5	
Elbow	Cook	Tofte	516	382	23	7	
Elbow	Otter Tail	Battle Lake	189	80	46	24	
Elbow	Pine	Finlayson	103	73	33	5	
Elbow	St. Louis	Orr	1,659	664	60	6	
Elbow	St. Louis	Iron Junction	165	130	22	9	
Elbow Pond	Sherburne	Orrock					
Elephant	St. Louis	Orr	742	331	30	2.8	
Eleven	Kanabec	Kroschel	290	290	13	3.2	
Eleven	Pine	Sturgeon Lake	109	69	49	7	
Eleventh Crow Wing	Hubbard	Akeley; 47°00′53″N 94°43′29″W	790	169	80	14	
Elizabeth	Kandiyohi	Atwater	1,054	1,054	9	4	
Elk	Clearwater	Lake Itasca	271	73	93	13.7	
Elk	Grant	Hoffman	190	97	29	6.5	
Elk (Big)	Sherburne	Clear Lake	360	360	9	1.9	
Elk (Little)	Sherburne	Zimmerman	353	353	15	2.5	
Elk Pond	Sherburne	Elk River					
Ellering	Stearns	Greenwald	34	34	34.5	6	
Elliot	St. Louis	Eveleth	398	398	13	10	
Elm Island	Aitkin	Aitkin	522	389	25		
Elmo	Washington	Lake Elmo	206	44	140	14	
Elora	St. Louis	Cotton	296	110	35	9.7	
Ely	St. Louis	Eveleth	673	225	70	15	
Elysian	Waseca	Elysian	1,902	1,902	13		
Elysian Outlet Marsh	Waseca	Elysian	124	124	8	1	
Embarrass	St. Louis	Biwabik	442	407	19	5	
Embarrass Mine Pit	St. Louis	Aurora	156	12	465	33	
Ember	Wright	Silver Creek	58	23	45	11	
Emily	Crow Wing	Emily	664	664	13	6	
Emily	Le Sueur	St. Peter	235	165	37	2	
Emily	Pope	Hancock	2,377	2,377	7	1.5	
Emily	Ramsey	Arden Hills	13	13	10	3	
Emma	Hubbard	Dorset	78	31	50	11.8	
Emma	Meeker	Crow River	51	51	12	1.3	
Emma	Otter Tail	Clitherall	274	274	7	2.3	
Emma	Wright	Howard Lake	188	179	17	8.3	
Englemein	Stearns	Albany	31	31	24	10	
English Grove	Douglas						
Ensign	Lake	Ely	1,408	675	30	11	
Ericson	Morrison	Fort Ripley					
Erie	Meeker	Darwin	189	82	34	7	
Eskwagama	Lake	Silver Rapids	88	88	12	5	
Esquagama	St. Louis	Biwabik	366	82	90	8	
Esquagamah	Aitkin	Palisade	853	520	31	4	
Ethel	Otter Tail	Ottertail	194	69	64	14	
Eunice	Becker	Audubon	325	187	30	14.8	
Evenson	Meeker	Strout	130	130		2.4	
Everett	St. Louis	Ely	109	109	15	8	
Evergreen	Hubbard	Lake George	200	87	38	21.5	
Evergreen Ponds	Ramsey	Shoreview	18	18	18	4.6	
Fadden	Wright	Rassat	20	11	48	2.1	
Fairy	Todd	Sauk Centre	297	140	37		
Fall	Lake	Winton	2,173	1,178	32	7	38081100
Fallon	Meeker	Jennie	256	256		3.5	
Fannie	Isanti	Cambridge	366	308	33	6.2	
Farm	Lake	Ely	1,328	459	56	8	
Farm Island	Aitkin	Bennettville	2,054	883	56	11	1015900
Farm Pond	Stearns	Avon	5	5	9	6	
Father Pond	Stearns	St. Martin	14	14	8	3	
Feldges	Stearns	Clearwater	24	19	17	12	
Fenske	St. Louis	Ely	105	63	43	14	
Ferrell	Morrison	Randall	53	53		7.5	
Fiecke Marsh	Stearns	St. Nicholas	29	29	11	3.3	
Fifteen	Clay	Hawley	139	99	22	8	
Fifth Crow Wing	Hubbard	Nevis; 46°55′19″N 94°53′15″W	392	196	35	4.9	
Fink	Stearns	Saint Nicholas	34	34	12	4.6	
Finn Pond	Lake	Isabella	4	4	4.5	2	
Firemen's Clayhole	Carver	Chaska	8	7	23	4.2	
First	Wright	Monticello	17	9	37	5.5	
First Crow Wing	Hubbard	Hubbard; 46°50′06″N 94°50′32″W	526	526	15	12.5	
First Fulda	Murray	Fulda	179	179	7	1	
Fish	Anoka	East Bethel	334	334	10	6	
Fish	Cass	Hackensack	35	30	43	13.8	
Fish	Cass	Poplar	47	47	35	13.8	
Fish	Chisago	Harris	306	141	57	10	
Fish	Dakota	Eagan	31	24	34	4	
Fish	Hennepin	Maple Grove	223	45	48	2.7	
Fish	Jackson	Windom	300	150	26	5	
Fish	Kanabec	Mora	506	503	8	1.7	
Fish	Lake	Prairie Portage	96	73	30	12.1	
Fish	Le Sueur	Waterville	77	33	55	7.2	
Fish	Martin	Ceylon	140	140	14	1.3	
Fish	Martin	Odin	155	155	5	1	
Fish	Otter Tail	Parkers Prairie	435	428	17	5	
Fish	Otter Tail	Pelican Rapids	261	127	69	9	
Fish	Otter Tail	Fergus Falls	888	888	19	4	
Fish	Pine	Finlayson	184	184	18	8.5	
Fish	Sherburne	Clearwater	60	60	12	9.5	
Fish	St. Louis	Duluth	3,258	2,953	36	4.3	9049100/01/02
Fish	Scott	Prior Lake	171	74	28	6.5	
Fish	Sherburne	Clear Lake	60	60		7.9	
Fish	Stearns	Belgrade	178	178	8	6	
Fish	Stearns	St. Anthony	38	38	15	7	
Fish	Stevens	Donnelly	178	178	8	0.3	
Fish	Washington	Scandia	41	41	52	16.4	
Fish	Washington	Woodbury	9	9	10	5	
Fish	Washington	White Bear Lake	20	14	34	4.3	
Fish	Wright	Hasty	97	58	38	3	
Fishdance	Lake	Forest Center	185	185	54	16.4	
Fishhook	Hubbard	Park Rapids	1,632	661	76	9.5	
Fish Hook River Dam	Hubbard	Park Rapids	128	128	22	8.2	
Fish Trap	Crow Wing	Lake Hubert	38	38	9	7.2	
Fiske	Otter Tail	Battle Lake	250	186	26	5.2	
Five	Otter Tail	Vergas	224	108	77	14	
Five Deer Pond	Morrison	Pillager					
Five Island Ball)	Itasca	Effie	175	111	33	15	
Five Point	Cass	Hackensack	219	88	37	6	
Fladmark	Otter Tail	Erhard	51	21	45	22.4	
Flanders	Crow Wing	Mission	134	60	16	10	
Flax	Stevens	Alberta	122	122	16	0.3	
Fleming	Aitkin	Palisade	296	290	15		
Flinks Slough	Lac qui Parle	Clarkfield	73	73	13	12.1	
Floodwood	St. Louis	Goodland	328	157	55	7.5	
Floodwood Pond	Aitkin	Hartley Spur	1	1	10	4	
Florian Marsh	Marshall	Florian	46	46	9	3	
Florian Park Reservoir	Marshall	Florian	42	42	23	3	
Florida	Kandiyohi	Spicer	674	267	40	10.5	
Flowage	Aitkin	McGregor	705		8	2	
Floyd	Becker	Detroit Lakes	1,212	861	34	12	
Fog	Mille Lacs						
Fond du Lac Reservoir	Carlton	Fond du Lac	217	112	64	5.3	
Fool	Crow Wing	Wolford	228	228	17	12	
Foot	Kandiyohi	Willmar	694	663	24	3	
Forbay	Carlton	Brownell	34	27	16	3.4	
Forest	Itasca	Marcell	37	37	39	12	
Forest Lake	Washington	Forest Lake	2,251	1,531	37	5.1	
Forget-Me-Not	Becker	Lake Park	361	361	7	0.8	
Fort Ridgely State Park Pond	Nicollet	Fairfax	2	2	8	5	
Fosdick	Morrison	Fort Ripley	33	33		6.7	
Foster	Wright	Berning Mill	115	115	10	1.2	
Fountain	Freeborn	Albert Lea	534	534	14	2	
Fountain	Wright	Montrose	434	429	10	1.6	
Four Mile	Cook	Tofte	572	559	19.5	7.5	
Fourteen	St. Louis	Buhl	386	375	14.5		
Fox	Itasca	Marcell	280	193	75	12	
Fox	Murray	Currie	174	174	8.5	1.2	
Fox	Pine	Willow River	239	239	15	2.5	
Fox	Rice	Shieldsville	308	139	47	2	
Fox (East)	Crow Wing	Fifty Lakes	239	101	65	18	
Fox (West)	Crow Wing	Fifty Lakes	472	138	55	17	
Frances	Le Sueur	Elysian	797	502	60	8.5	
Francis	Isanti	Isanti	301	301	7	1.4	
Francis	Meeker	Kingston	921	871	17	6.5	
Franklin	Otter Tail	Pelican Rapids	1,087	749	48	11	
Franklin	St. Louis	Crane Lake	135	120	18	6.3	
Fredrickson Slough	Sherburne	Orrock	14	14		6.2	
Freeborn	Douglas	Farwell	241	171	18	4	
Freeborn	Freeborn	Freeborn	2,222	2,222	6.7	0.4	24004400
Fremont	Sherburne	Zimmerman	484	484	8	3.3	
French	Rice	Faribault	816	397	56	14	
French	Wright	Annandale	332	156	50	5	
French Marsh	Hennepin	Orono	15	15		4.3	
French Marsh	Hennepin	Orono	26	26		5.6	
Frevels	Stearns	New Munich	66	66	14	11	
Frieze	Morrison	Pierz	36	36		5.8	
Frog	Lake	Ely	41	21	38	16	
Frog	Morrison	Pillager					
Frontenac	Hubbard	Becida	204	173	16	6.5	
Frovold	Swift						
Fuller	Stearns	Clearwater	31	26	28	4	
Gabbro	Lake	Ely	896	457	50	3	
Gabimichigami	Cook	Tofte	1,186	144	209	15	
Games	Kandiyohi	Sunburg	515	242	42	9.3	
Ganz	Morrison	Burtrum	35	35		6.8	
Ganzer	Stearns	Richmond	27	27	42	14	
Garden	Lake	Ely	670	239	55	7	
Garfield	Hubbard	Laporte	979	521	32	11.2	
Gasconade	Morrison	Onamia					
Gate	St. Louis	Virginia	12	10	33	5.5	
Gegoka	Lake	Isabella	159	159	10	4	
Geneva	Douglas	Alexandria	631	265	63	9	
Geneva	Freeborn	Geneva	2,214	2,214	8	0.2	
George	Anoka	St. Francis	495	391	32	13.7	
George	Cass	Outing	720	711	20	4.5	
George	Hubbard	Lake George	798	453	29	9	
George	Kandiyohi	Spicer	231	112	34	15.5	
George	Stearns	Spring Hill	315	315	32	3	
George	Stearns	Saint Cloud	9	4	32	7.5	
German	Isanti	Oxlip	334	334	10	4.3	
German	Le Sueur	Elysian	899	521	51	5	
German	Otter Tail	Underwood	77	25	46	11.1	
German	Washington	Scandia	78	78		5.9	
Gervais	Ramsey	Little Canada	234	91	41	6.5	
Getchell	Stearns	St. Martin	72	72	5	1	
Getchell Pond	Stearns	St. Martin	6	6	8	2	
Gijikiki	Lake	Prairie Portage	113	113	70	16.4	
Gilbert	Crow Wing	Brainerd	369	226	45	16	
Gilbert	Douglas	Holmes City	204	190	17	2	
Gilchrist	Pope	Sedan	321	206	24	4.2	
Gilchrist	Wright	Buffalo	285	285		5.3	
Gilfillian	Ramsey	White Bear Lake	110	110	9		
Gilfillin	Blue Earth						
Gill	Clearwater	Mallard	356	356	12	6	
Gilstad	Beltrami	Blackduck	294	112	55	8.8	
Girl	Cass	Longville	406	272	81	10	
Gladstone	Crow Wing	Nisswa					
Glen	Hennepin	Glen Lake	98	89	25	10	
Gleason	Hennepin	Wayzata	166	141	16		
Glesne	Kandiyohi						
Goble	Wright	South Haven					
Godfrey-Glen Pit	St. Louis	Chisholm	2	2	10	5	
Godlisch	Redwood	Morton	39	39	12	6	
Golden	Anoka	Circle Pines	57	51	25	5	
Gold Mine	Redwood	Delhi	11	11	36	12	
Gold Pond	Morrison	Motley					
Gonz	Wright	Saint Michael	71	71		4.6	
Goodman	Itasca	Spring Lake	16	16	12	4.3	
Goodman Marsh	Lac qui Parle	Burr	66	66	6	4.6	
Goodners	Stearns	Cold Spring	150	97	24	3	
Goose	Carver	Waconia	302	296	10	8	
Goose	Cass	Elevenmile Corner	32	32	9.5	4	
Goose	Cass	Lake Shore	126	126	8	3	
Goose	Chisago	Stark	754	370	55	5.8	
Goose	Freeborn	Albert Lea	80	80	13	8	
Goose	Goodhue	Red Wing	157	157	5.7		
Goose	Hennepin	Osseo	62	62	16	1	
Goose	Houston	Cee Jefferson	25	25	8	3	
Goose	Itasca	Spring Lake	23	23	6	4	
Goose	Le Sueur	Cordova	36	36	8	2	
Goose	Lyon	Lynd	148	148	9	1.9	
Goose	Meeker	Strout	119	119	12	2	
Goose	Morrison	Randall	53	53			
Goose	Pennington	Carpenters Center	18	18	5	3	
Goose	Pope	Terrace	323	323	17	8	
Goose	Ramsey	Lake Shore Park	114	114	6	2	
Goose	Scott	Credit River	42	42	9	7.5	
Goose	Sherburne	Lake Fremont	42	42		7.4	
Goose	Todd	North Shore	212	212	6	6	
Goose	Waseca	Meriden	327	327	12	6	
Goose	Washington	Scandia	75	41	25	7	
Goose	Wright	Buffalo	51	52	14	1	
Goose	Wright	French Lake	95	95	14	10	
Goose Prairie	Clay	Hitterdahl	122		5		
Goose Prairie Marsh	Clay	Hitterdahl	145	145	12	6.5	
Gorman	Le Sueur	Le Center	499	499	14	6	
Grace	Cook	Forest Center	432	297	16	8	
Grace	Hubbard	Bemidji	859	340	42	6.8	
Grace	Pine	Duxbury	79	79	10	2.9	
Graham	Benton	Rice					
Graham	Otter Tail	Frazee	210	126	34	10.8	
Grace Marsh	Mahnomen	Bejou	40	40	6	2	
Grand	St. Louis	Twig	1,592	1,510	24	12	
Grand	Stearns	Cold Spring	655	235	34	4	
Granite	Morrison	Pierz					
Granite	Wright	Annandale	361	108	34	6	
Grant	Beltrami	Wilton	208	85	92	11	
Grass	Stearns	Brooten	201	201	7	5	
Grass	Wright	Annandale	71	61	35	7	
Grass	Wright	Cokato					
Grassy	St. Louis	Ely	213	213	15	8	
Grave	Crow Wing	Brainerd	168	168	13	1.3	
Grave	Itasca	Marcell	500	304	39	9.5	
Gravel	Stearns	St. Martin	56	56	11	8	
Great Northern	Stearns	Cold Spring	356	355	19		
Green	Chisago	Chisago City	1,714	1,228	32	7	
Green	Isanti	Princeton	802	357	28	3	
Green	Kandiyohi	Spicer	5,406	2,035	110	13.2	
Green Mountain	Wright	Buffalo	156	156	10	2.3	
Green Pond	Stearns	Melrose	4	4	6	4	
Greenleaf	Le Sueur	Montgomery	293	261	18		
Greenleaf	Meeker	Litchfield	224	180	18	2.4	
Greenstone	Lake	Ely	345	131	72	12	
Greenway Mine Pit	Itasca	Grand Rapids	72	7	295	30	
Greenwood	Cook	Grand Marais	2,021	537	112	14.5	
Greenwood	Lake	Isabella	1,300	1,300	7	3.2	
Grindstone	Pine	Sandstone	526	71	153	8	
Grindstone Reservoir	Pine	Hinckley	26	26	11	5.5	
Grosilliers	Clearwater						
Grotes Pond	Goodhue	Wacouta	21	21	12	6.5	
Groth Marsh	Nobles	Wilmont	36	36		5.2	
Grove	Pope	Sedan	379	265	31	18	
Gun	Aitkin	Palisade	730	292	44	7.5	
Gunderson	Itasca	Talmoon	146	47	41	13	
Gull	Cass	Nisswa	9,418	2,825	80	13	
Gunn	Itasca	Marcell	342	142	39	9	
Haags	Stearns	Eden Valley	36	36	9	7.9	
Haags Slough	Stearns	Eden Valley	21	21	10	2	
Hafften Lake	Hennepin						
Hale	Itasca	Blackberry	131	114	59	10.5	
Hale	Itasca	Squaw Lake	14	14	6	3	
Hale	Itasca	Grand Rapids	130	37	60	17	
Halfmoon	Wabasha	Kellogg	229	229	13	6	
Half Moon	Meeker	Manannah					
Half Moon	St. Louis	Eveleth	153	58	40	8.5	
Hallett	Nicollet	Saint Peter	14	14	23	11	
Halvorson	Stearns	Brooten	138	138	8	3	
Ham	Anoka	Ham Lake	174	174	22	6.8	
Ham	Anoka	Blaine	168	160	22	4.9	
Ham	Morrison	Lincoln	38	20	22	10	
Hammal	Aitkin	Aitkin	374	262	44	10	
Hancock	Otter Tail	Battle Lake	182	109	23	5	
Hand	Cass	Backus	269	140	57	12	
Handlo's	Ramsey	White Bear Lake	7	7	7.7	5	
Hanging Horn	Carlton	Barnum	408	86	80	8.8	
Hanging Kettle	Aitkin	Aitkin	302	142	35		
Hannah	Morrison	Pine Center	95	67	27	8.5	
Hanrahan	Scott						
Hanska	Brown	Hanska	1,773	1,773	16		
Hanson Marsh	Murray	Dovray	84	84		2	
Harold	Meeker	Acton	126	126		2.2	
Harriet	Hennepin	Minneapolis	335	85	87	12	
Harriet	Lake	Isabella	265	194	37	15	
Harris	Blue Earth	New Ulm	12	12	10	3	
Harstad Slough	Stevens						
Hart	Hubbard	Guthrie	224	224	13	12	
Hart	Itasca	Pengilly	325	75	55	12	
Hartley	Itasca	Nashwauk	281	98	49	10	
Hartnett	Stearns	Sauk Centre	35	35	16	7	
Hatch	Itasca	Marcell	243	49	88	11	
Hatch	Rice						
Hattie	Hubbard	Lake George	259	77	39	8.5	
Hattie	Stevens	Alberta	477	477	9	3.2	
Hattie	Cass	Pine River	588	198	30		
Haus Marsh	Stearns	Marty	34	34	6	4	
Hawks Nest	Lincoln	Ivanhoe	282	282	7.3	1	
Hay	Carlton	Wrenshal	215	214	16		
Hay	Cass	Backus	350	179	56	11.6	
Hay	Crow Wing	Riverton	52	30	19	12	
Hay (Lower)	Crow Wing	Jenkins	685	215	100	11	
Hay (Upper)	Crow Wing	Jenkins	581	184	42	5	
Hazel	Cass	Longville	14	7	38	6.7	
Hazel	Lake	Forest Center	104	104	7	7	
Hazel	Wadena	Staples	31	31	7	5	
Hazeltine	Carver	Hazeltine	152	152	24	1	
Head	Otter Tail	Richville	249	137	26	6.5	
Heather	Benton	Foley					
Heart	Clearwater	Zerkel	206	54	55	24.1	
Hecorts Marsh	Le Sueur						
Hedmans	Itasca	Zemple					
Heenan	Meeker	Jennie	42	42		4.9	
Heffron	Cass	Longville	51	47	35	14	
Hefta	Kandiyohi						
Height of Land	Becker	Detroit Lakes	3,520	3,190	21	7.5	
Heilberger	Otter Tail	Erhard	224	97	47	12.6	
Helene	Sherburne	Lake Fremont	18	18		8.2	
Helga	Meeker	Grove City	117	117		1.2	
Helmbrecht Pond	Wright	West Albion			8		
Henderson	Kandyohi	Spicer	72	72	69	8	
Hendricks	Lincoln	Hendricks	1,557	1,557	12	2.2	
Hennepin	Hubbard	Becida	407	407	14	9.2	
Henry	Stearns	Lake Henry	112	112	16	0.5	
Henry	Wright	Annandale					
Henshaw	Wright	Albion Center	272	272	8		
Heritage Center Ponds	Stearns	St. Cloud	11	11	7	7	
Heron	Jackson	Heron Lake	195	195	9	7.2	
Heron	Jackson	Lakefield	2,845	2,845	5		32005700
Hiawatha	Hennepin	Minneapolis	53	25	33	5	
Hibbing Taconite Tailings Basin	St. Louis	Hibbing	1,252	1,252		5.6	
Hiccup	Sherburne	Clear Lake					
Hickory Pond	Morrison	Swanville					
Hidden	Sherburne	Big Lake	4	4			
Hidden	Sherburne	Big Lake	67	67		5.5	
Hidden	Stearns	St. Augusta	11	11	10	4	
Hidden	Wright	Annandale	7	3	32		
Hidden Pond	Sherburne	Santiago					
High	Martin	Northrop	87	87	8	2.6	
High	St. Louis	Ely	273	99	66	13.5	
High Island	Otter Tail	Edwards	64	64	13	3.3	
High Island	Sibley	New Auburn	1,389	1,389	15	2	
Highland	Itasca	Marcell	105	56	38		
Highland	Lake	Two Harbors	115	115		3.6	
Highland Park Pond	Hennepin	Edina	13	13	6	6	
Highlander	Cook	Hovland	29	29		10.2	
Highlife	Lake	Isabella	19	19	23	8.9	
Highpoint	Lyon	Russell					
Hilary	Stearns	Collegeville	9	9	5	3	
Hill	Aitkin	Hill City	794	354	48	7.6	
Hill	Aitkin	Aitkin	27	16	67	15	
Hill	Itasca	Alder	4	4	27		
Hill	Itasca	Grand Rapids	46	27	32	13.8	
Hill River	Polk	McIntosh	102	67	60	5.3	
Hill-Annex Pit	Itasca	Marble	775	775	300	19	
Hilligas	Polk	Fosston	135	135		3.5	
Hills Reservoir	Rock	Hills	5	5	12	2.2	
Hinds	Hubbard	Park Rapids	294	221	36	15	
Hiniker Pond	Blue Earth	North Mankato	18	12	21	8.5	
Hinz	Stearns	Clearwater	13		35	7	
Hoboken Pond	Stearns	Sauk Centre	9	9	12	2	
Hobza Marsh	Blue Earth	Pemberton	107	107	3	3	
Hoeffken	Carver						
Hoffman	Isanti	Martin Lake	62	62		3.6	
Hoffman	Otter Tail	Vergas	157	150	20	11.5	
Hogback Ridge	Hennepin	Bloomington	14	14	15	3	
Holden	Morrison	Randall	12	12		7.8	
Holiday	Hennepin	Minnetonka	7	7	8	0.4	
Holkers Slough	Wright	Monticello	15	15		1.6	
Holloway (Bass)	Itasca	Wirt	193	69	40	14	
Holman	Itasca	Bovey	146	78	65	16	
Holt Marsh	Chisago	Marine on Saint Croix					
Holy Name	Hennepin	Medina	65	65	7	2.5	
Home	Norman	Syre	80			6	
Homer	Cook	Lutsen	443	400	22	6.4	
Hook	McLeod	Hutchinson	327	324	18	1.3	
Hope	Meeker	Grove City	250	250	10	0.6	
Hornbean	Dakota	Sunfish Lake	20	20	12	6.5	
Horseshoe	Brown	New Ulm	26	26	17	6	
Horseshoe	Cass	Backus	225	80	51	11	
Horseshoe	Blue Earth	Judson	13	13	16	4	
Horseshoe	Chisago	Harris	197	112	53	6	
Horseshoe	Hubbard	Laporte	253	143	52	13.5	
Horseshoe	Itasca	Marcell	270	241	25	10.5	
Horseshoe	Le Sueur	Waterville	393		26	2.2	
Horseshoe	Morrison	Upsala	26	26		5.4	
Horseshoe	Stearns	Richmond	550	275	57	3	
Hosta Pond	Morrison	Pierz					
Howard	Wright	Howard Lake	717	318	39	3.5	
Hubbel Pond	Becker	Rochert	37	37	8	3.2	
Hubred	Douglas						
Hubert	Crow Wing	Nisswa	1,294	465	83	14	
Hulbert	Stearns	Clearwater	13		25	14	
Hungry	Becker	Frazee	240	180	60	9.7	
Hungry Man	Becker	Two Inlets	143	87	21	11.5	
Hunters	Wright	Albertville	102	102		2.4	
Huntington Mine	Crow Wing	Crosby	93	14	258	38.5	
Hystad	Kandiyohi						
Ice Cracking	Becker	Ponsford	331	80	73	14.2	
Ida	Becker	Lake Park	580	435	20	7	
Ida	Douglas	Alexandria	4,289	1,673	106	11	21012300
Ida	Wright	Monticello	225	109	60	15.5	
Ida	Wright	Oster	84	60	26	1.5	
Idlewild	Hennepin	Eden Prairie	15	15	9	4	
Ima	Lake	Ely	741	210	116	10.8	
Imholte Slough	Sherburne	Clear Lake	89	89		3.4	
Ina	Douglas	Melby	202	105	48	3	
Independence	Hennepin	Maple Plain	844	425	58	3	
Indian	Wright	Silver Creek	139	65	31	3.5	
Indian Jack	Crow Wing	Wolford	86	64	25	9.5	
Inguadona	Cass	Longville	1,116	565	79	12	
Insula	Lake	Ely	2,957	1,190	63	11	38039700
Interstate Pond	Stearns	Melrose	4	4	8	4	
Irene	Douglas	Miltona	630	224	44	5.5	
Irma	Itasca	Suomi	365	365	56	7.5	
Irving	Beltrami	Bemidji	613	546	19	4	
Isabella	Lake	Isabella	1,257	956	19	5	
Isabelle	Dakota	Hastings	103	103	5.5	3	
Isabelle	Stearns	Meire Grove	39	39	21	3	
Isabelle	Stearns	Meire Grove	26	26	3	1	
Island	Aitkin	Tamarack	243	194	25	6.5	
Island	Anoka	Linwood	72	72	40	9	
Island	Becker	Snellman	1,142	457	38	10.5	
Island	Hubbard	Park Rapids	544	179	65	12	
Island	Itasca	Northome	3,088	1,195	35	7.5	31091300
Island	Itasca	Taconite	52	41	35	9	
Island	Lyon	Lynd	169	169	8	1.5	
Island	Mahnomen	Lengby	611	331	43	3.5	
Island	Pine	Sturgeon Lake	510	267	42	10.1	
Island	St. Louis	Goodland	227	142	65	14.3	
Island	Stearns	St. Nicholas	92	92	19	13	73004200
Island Lake Reservoir	St. Louis	Duluth	8,000	3,260	94	4.3	69037200/01/02
Island North	Carlton	Cromwell	101	87	25	5.5	
Island South	Carlton	Cromwell	281	207	22	4.5	
Itasca	Clearwater	Lake Itasca	1,077	449	40	5	
Jack the Horse	Itasca	Marcell	383	245	45	12.5	
Jackson Marsh	Lyon	Milroy	51	51	6	1.3	
Jacobsons Marsh	Lyon	Balaton	42	42	7	4	
Jane	Washington	Lake Elmo	145	104	39	17	
Janette	St. Louis	Goodland	137	119	55	7.5	
Japp	Stearns	Albany	26	26	9	0.5	
Jasper	Lake	Ely	154	123	25	14	
Jay Gould	Itasca	Cohasset	426	292	33	10	
Jefferson	Le Sueur	Cleveland	1,141		37		
Jejune	Morrison	Pine Center					
Jennie	Meeker	Dassel	1,056	1,056	15	3.5	
Jessie	Itasca	Talmoon	1,753	455	42	8	
Jessie Pit	Itasca	Coleraine	32	32	112	20.6	
Jewett	Otter Tail	Elizabeth	737	262	75	9	
Jewett WMA Impoundment	Aitkin	Glen	78	78		5.9	
Jewitt	Meeker	Jennie	253	253	22	1.0	
Jim	Sherburne	Santiago					
Johanna	Pope	Brooten	1,584	1,584	10	10	
Johanna	Ramsey	Arden Hills	213	96	43	9.5	
John	Wright	Annandale	411	353	28	7.3	
John Reservoir	Yellow Medicine	Porter	20	20	12	5.9	
Johnson	Itasca	Marcell	305	89	51	15	
Johnson	Itasca	Grand Rapids	492	146	88	13	
Johnson	Morrison	Flensburg					
Johnson	Morrison	Randall	10	10		8.5	
Johnson	Morrison	Randall	21	21		11.5	
Johnson	Otter Tail	Dalton	338	165	32	6.5	
Johnson	St. Louis	Ely	465	464	18	3	
Johnson	St. Louis	Crane Lake	1,674	557	88	9	
Johnson Slough	Sherburne	Orrock	45	45		3.2	
Jolly Ann	Otter Tail	Dalton	256	131	89	10.1	
Jonathan	Carver	Hazeltine	20	20	12	2	
Jones	Sherburne	Clear Lake	68	68		2	
Jordan Mill Pond	Scott	Jordan	16	17	18	12.2	
Josephine	Ramsey	Roseville	118	81	44	6.8	
Josephine	Sherburne	Orrock	34	34		4.3	
Jude	Wright	Maple Lake	26	26		5.0	
Judson Mine Pit	St. Louis	Buhl	20	3	64	35	
Judy	Ramsey	Arden Hills	16	16	12	4	
Juergens	Todd	Little Sauk	118	90	22	3	
Juggler	Becker	Ponsford	365	149	78	17	
Julia	Beltrami	Puposky	450	167	43	7	
Julia	Sherburne	Clear Lake	154	154	15	3	
June	Crow Wing	Trommald	100	14	51	14	
Juni	Brown	Lake Hanska East	62				
Junkins	Wright	Albright	54	54		1.8	
Kabekona	Hubbard	Laporte	2,252	532	133	10.5	29007500
Kabetogama	St. Louis	Kabetogama	25,760	7,440	80		69084500
Kalla	Stearns	Avon	107	41	48	11.1	
Kalmar Reservoir 3	Olmsted	Byron					
Kalmar Reservoir 7	Olmsted	Byron	20	20			
Kane (Hemphill)	Becker	Two Inlets	31	16	52	14.5	
Kego	Crow Wing	Fifty Lakes	272		20	12	
Kekekabic	Lake	Ely	1,620	97	195	18	
Keitzman Slough	Grant	Herman	65	65	12	10.2	
Keller	Ramsey	Maplewood	73	73	8	4.3	
Keller	Sherburne	Big Lake					
Kelser's Pond	Carver	Victoria	19	13	34	2.5	
Kenogama	Itasca	Pennington	571	571	7	3	
Kepper	Stearns	Avon	175	175	7	3	
Kerr Pit	St. Louis	Mahoning	16	16	72	8.8	
Kibbee	Clearwater	Elbow Lake Village	38	38	16	9	
Killdeer	Itasca	Wirt	140	140	15	9	
Kimball Pond	Stearns	Kimball	6	6	12	9	
Kimbe Marsh	Lyon						
King	Itasca	Taconite	296	141	23	4	
King	Meeker	Strout	577	577		1.5	
Kings	Stearns	Freeport	203	46	44	7	
Kitchi	Beltrami	Pennington	1,785	714	50	8	
Kjostad	St. Louis	Buyck	397	286	50	6.5	
Klawitter Pond	Washington	Lake Elmo	5		14	8	
Kliever Marsh	Sherburne	Elk River	27	27		4.3	
Klinker's Marsh	Murray	Current Lake	102	102		6.9	
Knaus	Stearns	Cold Spring	205	202	20		
Knieff	Crow Wing	White Hawk	44	18	42	12	
Knife	Kanabec	Mora	1,266	1,266	15	2	
Knife	Lake‡	Ely	4,919	1,037	179	21	38040400
Knife Falls Reservoir	Carlton	Cloquet	61	18	32	4.3	
Knuckle Pond	Stearns	St. Martin	8	8	12	2	
Koetter	Stearns	Richmond	217	217	34	3	
Kohlman	Ramsey	Little Canada	84	84	9	5.2	
Kohlmeier	Steele	Owatonna	32	32	14	13	
Koma	Lake	Forest Center	250	250	14	3	
Koop	Stearns	Avon	60	27	52	10	
Koronis	Stearns	Paynesville	3,014	1,176	132	5.2	
Koronis Pond 1	Stearns	Eden Valley	6	6	12	4	
Koronis Pond 2	Stearns	Paynesville	9	9	10	5	
Kossila Oxbow	Wadena						
Kraemer	Stearns	Avon	195	105	30	5	
Kraft	Morrison	Randall	10	10			
Krays	Stearns	Cold Spring	95	82	40	2.3	
Kreatz	Hennepin	Plymouth	10				
Kreigle	Stearns	Avon	102	63	66	12	
Krilwitz	Aitkin	Waldeck	15	15	12	11.9	
Kroon	Chisago	Lindstrom	192	150	30	6.2	
Kuhl	Morrison	Flensburg					
Kurtz Pond	Morrison	Hillman					
Kvernmo Marsh	Lincoln	Hendricks	47	47	7	2.3	
La	Washington	Newport	44	44	10	4	
La Salle	Hubbard	Becida	238	16	213	13	
Lace	Cook	Maple Hill	25	25	8	8	
Lac qui Parle	Lac qui Parle	Milan	5,589	5,589	15		37004600/01/02
Lacey	Otter Tail	Dalton	91	91		1.5	
Lady	Todd	Grey Eagle	207	68	62	10	
Lady Slipper	Lyon	Cottonwood	247	247	11	1.1	
Lagerquist	Morrison	Randall	31	13	49	12.1	
Lake	Crow Wing	Mission	23	23	9	8.5	
Lake 0a	Douglas	Belle River	21	21		2.6	
Lake 0a	Wright	Monticello	25	25		2.8	
Lake 0aa	St. Louis	Kelly Lake	199	199	8	6	
Lake 0bb	St. Louis	Kelly Lake	81	81	8	5.8	
Lake 0d	Todd	Long Prairie	20	20		3.3	
Lake 0q	St. Louis	Grant	44	44		6.7	
Lake 0z	St. Louis	Kelly Lake	124	124	5	7.8	
Lake 1	Douglas	Osakis	51	51		5.2	
Lake 1	Itasca	Cohasset	50	50		13.8	
Lake 1	Stearns	Brooten	31	31	9	6.6	
Lake 2	Benton	Duelm	30	30		1.8	
Lake 2	Morrison	Hillman					
Lake 3	Benton	Sauk Rapids					
Lake 3	Otter Tail	Miltona	29	29		1.6	
Lake 4	Sherburne	Elk River	5	5		4.1	
Lake 4	Wright	Otsego					
Lake 5	Wright	Otsego					
Lake 6	Benton	Rice					
Lake 6	Meeker	Dassel	48	48		3.8	
Lake 6	Sherburne	Elk River	8	8		5.7	
Lake 6	Wright	Otsego					
Lake 7	Meeker	Dassel					
Lake 7	Wright	Otsego	18	18		3.2	
Lake 8	Benton	Watab					
Lake 8	Kandiyohi	Atwater	20	20		3	
Lake 8	Wright	Otsego	25	25		2.0	
Lake 9	Kandiyohi	Atwater	17	17		3	
Lake 9	Meeker	Dassel	122	122		4.0	
Lake 9	Sherburne	Elk River	31	31			
Lake 10	Benton	Sartell					
Lake 10	Morrison	Onamia	21	21		9.1	
Lake 11	Kandiyohi	Cosmos	12	12		3	
Lake 11	Sherburne	Elk River					
Lake 12	Meeker	Lamson					
Lake 14	Benton	Royalton	15	15		3.7	
Lake 14	Todd	Staples	5	5		3.3	
Lake 14	Todd	Staples	36	36		3.3	
Lake 15	Wadena	Huntersville	43	43		2.3	
Lake 16	Stearns	Fairhaven	22	22	8	3	
Lake 16	Wadena	Huntersville	52	52		1.3	
Lake 17	Stearns	Lynden	48	48	7	3.6	
Lake 17	Wadena	Huntersville	39	39		1.3	
Lake 18	Sherburne	Zimmerman	35	35		6.7	
Lake 18	Stearns	Fairhaven	23	23	12	7.2	
Lake 19	Kandiyohi	Cosmos	22	22		2.6	
Lake 19	Mille Lacs	Vineland	21	21		5.2	
Lake 19	Sherburne	Zimmerman					
Lake 20	Sherburne	Zimmerman					
Lake 22	Benton	Rice					
Lake 23	Benton	Sauk Rapids					
Lake 24	Wright	Hanover	31	31		3.7	
Lake 25	Benton	Sauk Rapids	11	11	26		
Lake 25	Sherburne	Zimmerman					
Lake 25	Wadena	Menahga	18	18		2.6	
Lake 26	Douglas	Belle River	33	33		3.3	
Lake 26	Sherburne	Zimmerman					
Lake 27	Sherburne	Crown	30	30		7.0	
Lake 27	Stearns	St. Augusta	9	9	8	3	
Lake 28	Stearns	St. Augusta	27	27	8	3.8	
Lake 30	Wright	Buffalo					
Lake 32	Douglas	Miltona	59	59		3.3	
Lake 32	Sherburne	Lake Fremont	12	12		7.5	
Lake 33	Wright	Delano	13	13		5.1	
Lake 35	Sherburne	Lake Fremont					
Lake 35	Wadena	Menahga	13	13		7.9	
Lake 35	Wright	Delano	11	11		6.4	
Lake 36	Wadena	Menahga	33	33		4.6	
Lake 37	Sherburne	Crown					
Lake 38	Douglas	Miltona	10	10		4.3	
Lake 38	Sherburne	Crown	12	12		2.3	
Lake 39	Douglas	Nelson	38	38		2.3	
Lake 39	Stearns	Maine Prairie	15	15		3	
Lake 39	Wright	Montrose					
Lake 40	Stearns	Maine Prairie	18	18		6	
Lake 41	Meeker	Kingston					
Lake 41	Stearns	Watkins					
Lake 42	Sherburne	Lake Fremont	16	16		5.4	
Lake 42	Wright	Rockford					
Lake 43	Douglas	Forada	28	28		5.2	
Lake 43	Wright	Rockford	46	46		5.0	
Lake 47	Meeker	Darwin	45	45		4.0	
Lake 47	Wright	Buffalo	21	21		3.2	
Lake 48	Douglas	Forada	39	39		1.3	
Lake 48	Sherburne	Lake Fremont					
Lake 49	Sherburne	Lake Fremont					
Lake 50	Sherburne	Lake Fremont					
Lake 50	Stearns	Marty	25	25	8	7	
Lake 50	Wadena	Huntersville	46	46		3.3	
Lake 51	Sherburne	Lake Fremont					
Lake 52	Wright	Buffalo	13	13		6.3	
Lake 53	Morrison	Randall	15	15			
Lake 53	Otter Tail	Dear Creek	79	79		2.6	
Lake 54	Sherburne	Lake Fremont	15	15		4.5	
Lake 54	Stearns	Rockville	31	31		6.4	
Lake 56	Stearns	Rockville					
Lake 57	Wright	Buffalo					
Lake 58	Wright	Buffalo					
Lake 59	Douglas	Carlos	26	26		4.9	
Lake 59	Kandiyohi	Spicer	9	9		1.6	
Lake 59	Morrison	Pillager	13	13		9.4	
Lake 59	Wright	Buffalo					
Lake 62	Wright	Buffalo	37	37		1.9	
Lake 63	Douglas	Carlos	20	20		2	
Lake 64	Douglas	Carlos	13	13		2	
Lake 65	Benton	Sartell					
Lake 65	Douglas	Carlos	12	12		1.3	
Lake 65	Meeker	Jennie					
Lake 65	Wright	Enfield	65	65		5.2	
Lake 70	Sherburne	Orrock	15	15		3.6	
Lake 71	Todd	Lincoln	17	17		7.5	
Lake 74	Sherburne	Elk River					
Lake 75	Douglas	Leaf Valley	34	34		3	
Lake 75	Sherburne	Orrock					
Lake 75	Wright	Monticello	34	34		2.3	
Lake 76	Morrison	Pillager					
Lake 76	Sherburne	Zimmerman	14	14		3.8	
Lake 77	Morrison	Pillager	15	15	27	4.9	
Lake 77	Sherburne	Princeton	22	22			
Lake 77	Wright	Monticello	18	18		5.8	
Lake 79	Meeker	Litchfield	21	21		2	
Lake 79	Sherburne	Orrock					
Lake 79	Wright	Monticello					
Lake 80	Wright	Monticello					
Lake 81	Wright	Monticello	15	15		3.2	
Lake 83	Wright	Monticello	13	13	5		
Lake 84	Wright	Monticello	24	24		2.3	
Lake 86	Sherburne	Orrock					
Lake 87	Sherburne	Orrock				9.6	
Lake 88	Morrison	Swanville	24	24		2.9	
Lake 89	Kandiyohi	Cosmos	13	13		2	
Lake 96	Morrison	Flensburg	16	16		3.7	
Lake 99	Douglas	Garfield	25	25		1.3	
Lake 100	Morrison	Lincoln	17	17		12.8	
Lake 106	Morrison	Randall	38	38		10	
Lake 106	Sherburne	Becker	29	29		4.5	
Lake 107	Morrison	Randall					
Lake 110	Kandiyohi	Spicer	7	7		3.6	
Lake 111	Kandiyohi	Spicer	31	31		1	
Lake 111	Morrison	Randall					
Lake 111	Wright	Highland	24	24		2.9	
Lake 112	Morrison	Randall	12	12		9.9	
Lake 113	Morrison	Randall					
Lake 113	Wright	Highland					
Lake 114	Morrison	Randall	11	11		10.8	
Lake 114	Sherburne	Santiago					
Lake 115	Sherburne	Santiago					
Lake 115	Wright	Highland	12	12		3.0	
Lake 116	Douglas	Leaf Valley	18	18		1.6	
Lake 116	Morrison	Lincoln					
Lake 117	Sherburne	Briggs Lake	8	8		5.2	
Lake 117	Wright	Buffalo					
Lake 118	Kandiyohi	Spicer	19	19		2.6	
Lake 118	Wright	Maple Lake			7		
Lake 119	Douglas	Carlos	24	24		5.2	
Lake 119	Morrison	Lincoln	8	8		8.5	
Lake 120	Morrison	Lincoln	24	24		5.2	
Lake 122	Douglas	Garfield	36	36		2.3	
Lake 122	Sherburne	Clear Lake	19	19		4.4	
Lake 123	Kandiyohi	Spicer	10	10		2	
Lake 123	Morrison	Lincoln	20	20		5.3	
Lake 124	Morrison	Lincoln					
Lake 124	Sherburne	Clear Lake					
Lake 125	Morrison	Lincoln					
Lake 126	Meeker	Greenleaf	73	73		2.6	
Lake 126	Todd	Long Prairie	29	29		6.2	
Lake 127	Kandiyohi	Spicer	12	12		5.6	
Lake 127	Sherburne	Clear Lake	32	32		4.5	
Lake 128	Kandiyohi	Spicer	10	10		1.3	
Lake 128	Meeker	Greenleaf	15	15		2.3	
Lake 128	Sherburne	Clear Lake	25	25		2.9	
Lake 129	Kandiyohi	Spicer	13	13		2.3	
Lake 130	Sherburne	Clear Lake	12	12		5.3	
Lake 130	Wright	Buffalo					
Lake 131	Douglas	Leaf Valley	23	23		5.2	
Lake 131	Sherburne	Clear Lake				4.8	
Lake 132	Kandiyohi	Spicer	26	26		2.6	
Lake 132	Morrison	Lincoln					
Lake 134	Morrison	Lincoln					
Lake 134	Sherburne	Clear Lake	34	34		4.5	
Lake 135	Douglas	Leaf Valley	17	17		3.3	
Lake 135	Wright	Enfield					
Lake 136	Sherburne	Clear Lake	7	7		3.5	
Lake 136	Wright	Enfield				5.7	
Lake 137	Douglas	Leaf Valley	17	17		1.6	
Lake 137	Sherburne	Clear Lake	37	37		4.1	
Lake 138	Morrison	Lincoln					
Lake 138	Sherburne	Clear Lake	33	33		4.2	
Lake 138	Wright	Silver Creek					
Lake 139	Douglas	Leaf Valley	24	24		6.6	
Lake 139	Meeker	Litchfield	71	71		2.4	
Lake 139	Morrison	Lincoln					
Lake 139	Sherburne	Clear Lake	8	8		3.5	
Lake 141	Wright	Silver Creek					
Lake 143	Wright	Silver Creek					
Lake 144	Morrison	Harding					
Lake 144	Sherburne	Duelm	26	26		5.7	
Lake 144	Wright	Enfield					
Lake 145	Kandiyohi	New London	8	8		4.6	
Lake 145	Wright	Silver Creek					
Lake 146	Morrison	Fort Ripley					
Lake 146	Stearns	Richmond					
Lake 147	Morrison	Fort Ripley					
Lake 149	Morrison	Randall					
Lake 149	Wright	Silver Creek					
Lake 150	Morrison	Randall					
Lake 150	Wright	Maple Lake					
Lake 151	Kandiyohi	New London	14	14		5.6	
Lake 151	Morrison	Randall	8	8			
Lake 151	Sherburne	Clearwater	8	8		5.9	
Lake 151	Wright	Maple Lake					
Lake 152	Morrison	Hillman					
Lake 152	Sherburne	Clearwater	121	121		4.8	
Lake 154	Morrison	Royalton					
Lake 154	Sherburne	Clear Lake	49	49		4.6	
Lake 154	Wright	Maple Lake	16	16		4.5	
Lake 155	Kandiyohi	Spicer	13	13		2	
Lake 155	Sherburne	Clear Lake	71	71		3.9	
Lake 155	Todd	Sauk Centre	16	16		4.3	
Lake 156	Sherburne	Clearwater	11	11		5.2	
Lake 157	Todd	Sauk Centre	44	44		2.3	
Lake 158	Morrison	Royalton					
Lake 158	Wright	Maple Lake	9	9		5.5	
Lake 159	Wright	Maple Lake					
Lake 160	Sherburne	St. Cloud					
Lake 160	Wright	Maple Lake					
Lake 162	Sherburne	Clear Lake					
Lake 163	Sherburne	Clear Lake	10	10		4.5	
Lake 164	Morrison	Burtrum					
Lake 164	Sherburne	Clear Lake					
Lake 165	Morrison	Burtrum					
Lake 165	Sherburne	Clear Lake	24	24		3.8	
Lake 165	Wright	Hasty	38	38		2.3	
Lake 166	Sherburne	Clear Lake	12	12		3.8	
Lake 166	Wright	Hasty					
Lake 167	Morrison	Sobieski					
Lake 169	Wright	Silver Creek					
Lake 170	Morrison	Burtrum					
Lake 172	Sherburne	Lake Fremont					
Lake 172	Wright	Hasty	91	91		5.1	
Lake 173	Morrison	Hillman					
Lake 173	Sherburne	Crown	9	9		4.0	
Lake 173	Wright	Silver Creek					
Lake 174	Sherburne	Elk River					
Lake 175	Sherburne	Zimmerman					
Lake 175	Wright	Emfield	7	7		4.9	
Lake 176	Sherburne	Orrock					
Lake 177	Sherburne	Orrock					
Lake 178	Sherburne	Orrock					
Lake 179	Sherburne	Orrock					
Lake 180	Sherburne	Orrock					
Lake 181	Sherburne	Orrock					
Lake 182	Morrison	Pine Center					
Lake 182	Sherburne	Orrock					
Lake 183	Sherburne	Orrock					
Lake 183	Todd	West Union	39	39		1.3	
Lake 185	Morrison	Harding					
Lake 185	Sherburne	Princeton	6	6		0.5	
Lake 187	Sherburne	Orrock				2.1	
Lake 189	Morrison	Pine Center					
Lake 189	Sherburne	Orrock				4.6	
Lake 189	Todd	West Union	15	15		2.3	
Lake 189	Wright	Howard Lake	13	13		4.9	
Lake 190	Sherburne	Zimmerman					
Lake 191	Morrison	Morrill					
Lake 192	Morrison	Pierz					
Lake 192	Sherburne	Zimmerman					
Lake 194	Douglas	Garfield	43	43		2.6	
Lake 194	Kandiyohi	Pennock	46	46		2	
Lake 195	Douglas	Garfield	18	18		2.6	
Lake 196	Morrison	Pierz					
Lake 196	Todd	Osakis	30	30		3.9	
Lake 196	Wright	Rice Lake	25	25		3.9	
Lake 197	Sherburne	Santiago					
Lake 197	Todd	Long Prairie	40	40		2	
Lake 198	Sherburne	Briggs Lake					
Lake 200	Kandiyohi	Willmar	9	9		3.6	
Lake 201	Wright	Rassat	13	13		2.4	
Lake 202	Sherburne	Clear Lake					
Lake 202	Todd	Long Prairie	31	31		1.3	
Lake 203	Wright	Highland	111	111		1.8	
Lake 205	Cass	Sylvan	13	13		5.2	
Lake 206	Sherburne	Briggs Lake					
Lake 208	Cass	Sylvan	78	78		8.5	
Lake 208	Sherburne	Santiago					
Lake 210	Sherburne	Clear Lake					
Lake 213	Sherburne	Clear Lake					
Lake 213	Todd	Hewitt	10	10		2.6	
Lake 216	Sherburne	Clear Lake					
Lake 217	Morrison	Pierz	44	44		4.7	
Lake 219	Morrison	Little Falls					
Lake 220	Morrison	Pierz					
Lake 222	Kandiyohi	New London	29	29		5.2	
Lake 222	Wright	Annandale					
Lake 225	Sherburne	Zimmerman					
Lake 225	Wright	Maple Lake	28	28		2.8	
Lake 226	Kandiyohi	Norway Lake	18	18		4.6	
Lake 226	Morrison	Randall					
Lake 228	Wright	Annandale					
Lake 231	Wright	Annandale					
Lake 232	Wright	Maple Lake					
Lake 233	Morrison	Randall					
Lake 234	Morrison	Randall					
Lake 235	Kandiyohi	Norway Lake	11	11		5.2	
Lake 235	Wright	Clearwater					
Lake 236	Kandiyohi	Norway Lake	95	95		5.2	
Lake 236	Wright	Hasty	17	17		2.6	
Lake 237	Kandiyohi	Norway Lake	10	10		4.3	
Lake 237	Sherburne	Becker	30	30		2.7	
Lake 237	Wright	Clearwater					
Lake 238	Sherburne	Elk River					
Lake 239	Kandiyohi	Norway Lake	24	24		7.5	
Lake 239	Morrison	Pillager					
Lake 240	Morrison	Pillager					
Lake 240	Stearns	Melrose	12	12		5.2	
Lake 240	Wright	Hasty					
Lake 241	Morrison	Pillager					
Lake 241	Morrison	Pillager					
Lake 242	Morrison	Pillager					
Lake 244	Wright	Clearwater	44	44	10	3.6	
Lake 245	Wright	Annandale					
Lake 246	Morrison	Lincoln					
Lake 247	Kandiyohi	Pennock	22	22		0.7	
Lake 247	Morrison	Lincoln					
Lake 247	Stearns	Greenwald	36	36		2.6	
Lake 248	Morrison	Lincoln					
Lake 248	Wright	Hasty					
Lake 249	Morrison	Lincoln					
Lake 249	Stearns	Clearwater	7	7			
Lake 252	Kandiyohi	Norway Lake	18	18		4.9	
Lake 252	Morrison	Cushing					
Lake 254	Stearns	Greenwald	37	37		9.5	
Lake 255	Morrison	Randall					
Lake 258	Meeker	Casey					
Lake 261	Stearns	Greenwald	51	51		1	
Lake 261	Wright	Knapp	44	44		2.1	
Lake 262	Stearns	Sauk Centre	31	31		1.3	
Lake 262	Wright	Knapp					
Lake 264	Meeker	Greenleaf	24	24		4.3	
Lake 264	Morrison	Flensburg					
Lake 264	Stearns	Sauk Centre	28	28		1.6	
Lake 266	Morrison	Flensburg					
Lake 267	Morrison	Flensburg					
Lake 268	Wright	Annandale	55	55	7	3.9	
Lake 269	Wright	French Lake					
Lake 270	Morrison	Johnson					
Lake 270	Wright	French Lake					
Lake 271	Stearns	Sauk Centre	13	13		6.9	
Lake 271	Todd	Burtrum	12	12		13.1	
Lake 272	Wright	French Lake					
Lake 275	Stearns	Sauk Centre	36	36		2	
Lake 277	Meeker	Lamson					
Lake 277	Morrison	Burtrum					
Lake 277	Wright	French Lake	10	10		3.7	
Lake 278	Morrison	Elmdale					
Lake 280	Kandiyohi	Raymond	25	25		4.9	
Lake 281	Morrison	Upsala					
Lake 282	Morrison	Upsala					
Lake 283	Morrison	Randall	33	33		10.3	
Lake 283	Wright	South Haven					
Lake 285	Wright	Fairhaven	21	21			
Lake 286	Morrison	Buckman					
Lake 287	Morrison	Buckman					
Lake 291	Wright	South Haven					
Lake 292	Sherburne	Orrock	34	34		4.4	
Lake 294	Sherburne	Zimmerman					
Lake 295	Sherburne	Zimmerman					
Lake 296	Sherburne	Zimmerman	9	9		4.0	
Lake 297	Sherburne	Orrock					
Lake 297	Stearns	Maine Prairie	10	10	6	6	
Lake 299	Morrison	Royalton					
Lake 300	Kandiyohi	Pennock	22	22		5.6	
Lake 300	Morrison	Royalton					
Lake 301	Wright	Monticello	22	22		8.0	
Lake 302	Wright	Otsego					
Lake 303	Cass	Sylvan	51	51		8.2	
Lake 304	Morrison	Lincoln					
Lake 305	Wright	Buffalo					
Lake 307	Kandiyohi	Sunburg	98	98		4.3	
Lake 308	Kandiyohi	Sunburg	6	6		2	
Lake 308	Morrison	Flensburg					
Lake 309	Wright	Buffalo					
Lake 310	Sherburne	Orrock					
Lake 311	Sherburne	Orrock					
Lake 311	Wright	French Lake					
Lake 312	Sherburne	Santiago					
Lake 312	Stearns	Fairhaven	22	22	17	6.9	
Lake 312	Wright	French Lake					
Lake 313	Wright	French Lake					
Lake 315	Wright	Annandale					
Lake 316	Stearns	Kimball	6	6			
Lake 317	Stearns	Rockville	11	11			
Lake 319	Cass	Sylvan	34	34		4.9	
Lake 319	Wright	Maple Lake					
Lake 321	Wright	Annandale					
Lake 323	Kandiyohi	Norway Lake	35	35		2	
Lake 323	Wright	Maple Lake					
Lake 324	Kandiyohi	Norway Lake	38	38		2	
Lake 327	Wright	Buffalo					
Lake 329	Meeker	Greenleaf	25	25		10.5	
Lake 330	Wright	Otsego					
Lake 333	Stearns	Sauk Centre	21	21		3	
Lake 337	Kandiyohi	Sunburg	8	8		3.9	
Lake 337	Sherburne	Princeton					
Lake 340	Kandiyohi	Sunburg	12	12		7.2	
Lake 341	Kandiyohi	Sunburg	31	31		5.6	
Lake 343	Wright	Maple Lake					
Lake 346	Cass	Pine River	17	17		2	
Lake 351	Wright	Otsego	33	33		1.5	
Lake 352	Meeker	Greenleaf	30	30		4.6	
Lake 353	Wright	Silver Creek					
Lake 355	Kandiyohi	Sunburg	31	31		2.6	
Lake 355	Wright	Hasty					
Lake 360	Kandiyohi	Sunburg	16	16		3.9	
Lake 361	Wright	Maple Lake					
Lake 362	Wright	Buffalo					
Lake 366	Sherburne	Santiago					
Lake 367	Sherburne	Orrock					
Lake 370	Wright	Annandale					
Lake 373	Kandiyohi	Sunburg	26	26		5.6	
Lake 380	Wright	Silver Creek					
Lake 381	Wright	Silver Creek					
Lake 384	Kandiyohi	Spicer	9	9		1.3	
Lake 387	Wright	Waverly					
Lake 388	Wright	Hanover	10	10		3.1	
Lake 390	Kandiyohi	New London	11	11		6.9	
Lake 391	Kandiyohi	New London	16	16		5.6	
Lake 394	Wright	Monticello	31	31		5.1	
Lake 398	Wright	Silver Creek					
Lake 400	Wright	Enfield					
Lake 403	Wright	South Haven					
Lake 406	Kandiyohi	Spicer	9	9		2	
Lake 407	Wright	Howard Lake					
Lake 410	Cass	Pine River	36	36		3.9	
Lake 411	Wright	Silver Creek	20	20		3.4	
Lake 412	Douglas	Carlos	32	32		1.3	
Lake 412	Wright	Dayton	19	19		6.1	
Lake 416	Wright	Albertville					
Lake 417	Kandiyohi	New London	4	4		9.8	
Lake 420	Stearns	Clearwater					
Lake 421	Stearns	Clearwater	21	21			
Lake 423	Wright	Buffalo					
Lake 424	Kandiyohi	Sunburg	10	10		5.9	
Lake 424	Wright	Buffalo					
Lake 425	Douglas	Alexandria	23	23		4.6	
Lake 425	Kandiyohi	Sunburg	22	22		3.9	
Lake 426	Wright	Saint Michael	9	9		2.5	
Lake 430	Stearns	Maine Prairie	8	8	12	7	
Lake 436	Wright	Maple Lake					
Lake 439	Wright	Montrose					
Lake 442	Cass	Pine River	32	32		6.6	
Lake 442	Wright	Highland					
Lake 448	Stearns	Richmond					
Lake 450	Stearns	Richmond					
Lake 451	Wright	Annandale					
Lake 455	Wright	Annandale					
Lake 456	Wright	Maple Lake					
Lake 460	Wright	Albion Center					
Lake 461	Wright	Rassat					
Lake 472	Kandiyohi	Sunburg	5	5		5.2	
Lake 475	Wright	French Lake					
Lake 477	Kandiyohi	Sunburg	11	11		3.9	
Lake 477	Wright	Annandale					
Lake 479	Wright	French Lake					
Lake 480	Stearns	Rockville	10	10	7		
Lake 483	Stearns	Rockville					
Lake 485	Wright	Monticello					
Lake 489	Stearns	Marty					
Lake 489	Wright	Hasty					
Lake 490	Stearns	Cold Spring					
Lake 490	Wright	Hasty					
Lake 491	Stearns	Marty	11	11			
Lake 492	Wright	Annandale					
Lake 497	Wright	Enfield					
Lake 498	Cass	Motley	22	22		13.1	
Lake 498	Wright	Monticello					
Lake 500	Wright	Maple Lake			3		
Lake 501	Cass	Pine River	50	50		7.9	
Lake 504	Stearns	Sauk Centre	17	17		8.5	
Lake 513	Stearns	Richmond					
Lake 514	Stearns	Richmond					
Lake 514	Wright	Silver Creek					
Lake 515	Wright	Silver Creek					
Lake 516	Stearns	Cold Spring					
Lake 516	Wright	Silver Creek					
Lake 532	Stearns	Rockville					
Lake 538	Stearns	Maine Prairie	11	11	6	4	
Lake 540	Stearns	Richmond					
Lake 556	Stearns	Waite Park	8	8			
Lake 557	Stearns	Pleasant Lake	4	4	5	3	
Lake 586	Douglas	Holmes City	26	26		2	
Lake 590	Stearns	Eden Valley	35	35		4.5	
Lake 598	Cass	Pine River	39	39		7.2	
Lake 599	Cass	Pine River	20	20		8.9	
Lake 621	Cass	Sylvan	23	23		3	
Lake 635	Cass	Pine River	28	28		5.6	
Lake 688	Cass	Pine River	53	53		7.5	
Lake 695	Cass	Pine River	24	24		7.9	
Lake 781	Cass	Sylvan	13	13		4.3	
Lake 801	Kandiyohi	Atwater	7	7		2	
Lake 928	Cass	Zemple	100	100	5	1.6	
Lake 3901	Wright	Montrose					
Lake 4201	Sherburne	Lake Fremont	18	18		5.9	
Lake 5401	Sherburne	Lake Fremont	13	13		5.8	
Lake 5901	Morrison	Pillager	7	7		6.3	
Lake 6201	Kandiyohi	Spicer	131	131		1.6	
Lake 6201	Wright	Buffalo	8	8		3.8	
Lake 7701	Sherburne	Princeton	3	3			
Lake 12801	Meeker	Greenleaf	5	5		18	
Lake 21401	Sherburne	St. Cloud	85	85		8.1	
Lake 22002	Wright	Rassat					
Lake 33701	Sherburne	Princeton	36	36		3.2	
Lake 34001	Wright	Rockford	20	20		2.4	
Lake 34102	Kandiyohi	Sunburg	5	5		7.5	
Lake 38701	Wright	Waverly					
Lake 39801	Kandiyohi	Willmar	11	11		2	
Lake 46401	Kandiyohi	New London	4	4		2.6	
Lake 47701	Kandiyohi	Sunburg	5	5		4.9	
Lake 47702	Kandiyohi	Sunburg	3	3		6.9	
Lake 50401	Wright	Enfield					
Lake Full of Fish	Kanabec	Warman	65	0	28		
Lake of the Isles	Hennepin	Minneapolis	109	89	31	3.9	
Lake of the Woods (Note: 307,000 acres in Minnesota, also partially in Manitoba and Ontario, Canada)	Lake of the Woods ‡	Warroad	950,400	79,253	210	3.9	39000200
Lake of the Woods	Sherburne	Zimmerman					
Langdon	Hennepin	Mound	144	82	38	1.5	
Lake Crystal	Blue Earth	Lake Crystal	379	379	8	1.2	
Lanesboro Mill Pond	Fillmore	Lanesboro	5	5	10	5	
Lange Marsh	Murray	Ruthton	36	36	5	2.3	
Large Henry	Swift	Appleton	220		9		
Lark	Polk	Olga	31	31	18	6.6	
Larsen Slough	Sherburne	Zimmerman	11	11		7.2	
Larson	Morrison	Flensburg	17	17		3.6	
Larue Pit	Itasca	Nashwauk	47	47	200	10	
Latoka	Douglas	Alexandria	776	155	108	14.5	
Laura	Stearns	Fairhaven	140	117	7	4.2	
Lauzers	Wright	Oster	73	73		1.9	
Lawn	Stearns	Paynesville	32	32	14	3	
Lawrence	Itasca	Taconite	395	316	32	4.5	
Lax	Lake	Finland	295	192	35	9.1	
Le Homme Dieu	Douglas	Alexandria	1,744	767	85	8	
LeMay	Rice	Wheatland	89	89	16	2.6	
Leander	St. Louis	Buhl	247	59	45	16	
Lebenstraum Pond	Morrison	Lastrup					
Lee	Clay	Hawley	134	86	36	6	
Leech	Cass	Walker	111,527	57,994	150		11020300
Leech Pond	Benton	Foley					
Leek	Otter Tail	Vergas	609	272	76	11.3	
Leeman	St. Louis	Gowan	106	106	13	10.2	
Leif	Becker	Audubon	488	316	26	6	
Leighton	Itasca	Cohasset	229	78	63	14	
Lemay	Dakota	Eagan	35	36	15.5	3.8	
Lemay	Dakota	Mendota	25	25	11	4.6	
Lena	Morrison	Lincoln	96	96	15	5.0	
Lendt	Chisago	Scandia	46	46	12	5.2	
Leora (called Elora)	St. Louis	Cotton	296	110	35	9.7	
LeRoy Sand Pit	Mower	Le Roy	3	3	14	10	
Leslie	Morrison	Randall					
Leven	Pope	Villard	283	161	33	3.5	
Lewis	Kanabec	Ogilvie	220	148	48	5.5	
Lida (North)	Otter Tail	Pelican Rapids	5,564	2,380	58	7	56074701
Lida (South)	Otter Tail	Pelican Rapids	856	356	48	8	56074702
Light Blue Quarry	St. Louis	Ridge	420	420	184	50	
Light Foot	Wright	Buffalo	68	56	22	3.5	
Lightning	Grant	Wendell	500	500	11	2.5	
Lilly	Waseca	Lake Elysaian	44	44	3	1	
Lima	Cook	Grand Marais	11	7	25	14.3	
Lime	Murray	Avoca	338	338	7	0.8	
Lime	Becker	Lake Park	98	98	8	1	
Limestone	Wright	Clearwater	188	101	34	8.3	
Lind	Cass	Backus	377	249	27	10	
Lind Pit	Itasca	Grand Rapids	82	8	284	25	
Lindstrom (North)	Chisago	Lindstrom	137	55	29	3.5	
Lindstrom (South)	Chisago	Lindstrom	499	208	34		
Line	Morrison	Lincoln					
Lingroth	Aitkin	Glen	81	81	25	1	
Linka	Pope	Sedan	197	78	50	12.5	
Linn	Chisago	Lindstrom	180	180	15	0.6	
Linneman	Stearns	Avon	109	102	15	7	
Linwood	Anoka	Wyoming	559	475	42	4	
Linwood	St. Louis	Markham	251	203	34	5.2	
Lions Park Pond	Sherburne	Elk River					
Lisa	Wright	South Haven	157	157	6	5	
Little	Chisago	Center City	159	124	23	3.4	
Little	Stearns	Richmond	48	48	14	3	
Little Bass	Cass	Outing	112	67	30		
Little Bass	Itasca	Cohasset	155	55	62	15	
Little Bass	Itasca	Togo	25	10	72	9.5	
Little Bear	Itasca	Togo	142	97	35	7	
Little Bemidji	Becker	Ponsford	275	59	58	15.5	
Little Birch	Cass	Remer	25	25	7	4	
Little Birch	St. Louis	Wahlsten	67	67	24	10	
Little Birch	Todd	Grey Eagle	839	277	89	13	
Little Bowstring	Itasca	Deer River	319	115	33	4.1	
Little Cavanaugh	Itasca	Cohasset	19	11	27	9	
Little Boy	Cass	Longville	1,372	466	74	10.8	
Little Coon	Itasca	Bigfork	76	20	123	14	
Little Cut Foot Sioux	Itasca	Deer River	619	530	20	6	
Little Diann	Sherburne	Lake Fremont					
Little Eagle	Wright	Silver Creek	36	16	35	8.3	
Little Elbow	Mahnomen	Waubun	158	119	18	8.5	
Little Emily	Crow Wing	Outing	111	89	26	8	
Little Floyd	Becker	Detroit Lakes	205	95	34	15	
Little Fourteen	St. Louis	Buhl	79	73	17	11	
Little Ganz	Morrison	Burtrum	15	15		3.9	
Little Hartnett Pond	Stearns	Sauk Centre	4	4	12	6	
Little Hubert	Crow Wing	Nisswa	185	161	41	10	
Little Ida	Wright	Silver Creek	27	27		7.2	
Little Island	Hubbard	Nevis	212	137	32	5.5	
Little Jessie	Itasca	Deer River	637	206	50	8.6	
Little John	Wright	South Haven	51	51	37	8.2	
Little Johnson	St. Louis	Crane Lake	481	471	28	8.5	
Little Logan	Aitkin	Hassman	17	17	8		
Little Long	St. Louis	Ely	293	78	45	17	
Little Mantrap	Hubbard	Goldenrod	47	47		11.5	
Little Mantrap	Hubbard	Park Rapids	380	197	54	14.3	
Little Markee	Crow Wing	Lake Hubert	13	13	22	13.6	
Little Markham	St. Louis	Markham	42	34	25	4.8	
Little Mary	Wright	Silver Creek	112	112	16	2.6	
Little Maryhew	Cook	Grand Marais	34	11	31	13.7	
Little McDonald	Otter Tail	Perham	1,174	413	109	19.1	
Little Mud	Stearns	St. Anna	21	21	17	9	
Little Moose	Itasca	Grand Rapids	271	123	23		
Little Oscar	Douglas	Alexandria	177	177	17	1.3	
Little Otter	Stearns	Fairhaven	18	18	16	8.9	
Little Pelican	Crow Wing	Breezy Point	283	206	34	18	
Little Pelican	Otter Tail	Vergas	345	256	25	11	
Little Pelican	Stearns	St. Anna	19	19	23	11	
Little Pine	Crow Wing	Cross Lake	387	225	36	9	
Little Rock	Benton	Rice	1,087	749	23	1.5	
Little Rock	Wright	Rassat	37	21	51	4.9	
Little Saganaga	Cook	BWCA	1,575	428	150	11.1	
Little Sand	Itasca	Squaw Lake	361	231	19		
Little Sand	St. Louis	Virginia	96	94	14	4	
Little Spirit	Jackson	Jackson	572	572	8	5.8	
Little Spring	Meeker	Dassel	76	76		4.4	
Little Spunk Pond	Stearns	Avon	6	6	8	2	
Little Stone	St. Louis	Two Harbors	181	140	17	4.8	
Little Sturgeon	St. Louis	Chisholm	266	54	22	4.5	
Little Tamarack	Pine	Duxbury	59	38	31	5.9	
Little Toad	Becker	Frazee	345	107	65	15.5	
Little Toad	Becker	Frazee	404	107	65	11	
Little Thunder	Cass	Remer	70	70	47	12	
Little Trout	St. Louis	Tower	538	178	37	9	
Little Trout	St. Louis	Crane Lake	239	79	95	17	
Little Turtle	Itasca	Talmoon	475	226	29	4	
Little Vermilion	St. Louis	Crane Lake	1,331	639	52	6.5	
Little Vermillion	Cass	Remer	133	74	55		
Little Wabana	Itasca	Grand Rapids	104	30	57	18	
Little White Oak	Itasca	Zemple	523	523	8	3	
Little Winnibigoshish	Itasca	Deer River	938	209	28	10	
Little Wolf	Meeker	Lamson	60	60		2.9	
Little Woman	Cass	Hackensack	35	35	14	6.2	
Lizzie	Otter Tail	Pelican Rapids	4,035	3,013	66	11.2	56076000
Lobster	Douglas	Garfield	1,308	667	65	8.5	
Locke	Wright	Clearwater	139	67	49	4.3	
Lockhart Swamp	Cass	Motley	4	4	8	2	
Lomond	Clearwater	Bagley	91	44	42	7.4	
Lone	Aitkin	Aitkin	448	148	60	25.8	
Long	Aitkin	Glen	415	120	116		
Long	Becker	Detroit Lakes	357	152	61	14	
Long	Beltrami	Turtle River	396	180	87	16.5	
Long	Beltrami	Puposky	719	683	18	9.5	
Long	Cass	Longville	926	356	115	12	
Long	Douglas	Evansville	218	201	18	5.5	
Long	Hennepin	Long Lake	261	131	33		
Long	Hubbard	Park Rapids	1,974	468	135	13	
Long	Itasca	Bigfork	331	177	34	8.5	
Long	Kandiyohi	New London	286	127	46	10.5	
Long	Kandiyohi	Willmar	1,575	1,489	16	10.6	
Long	Meeker	Grove City	771	771	11	0.8	
Long	Meeker	Jennie	67	67		2.4	
Long	Morrison	Fort Ripley	37	37		8.9	
Long	Morrison	Harding	125	63	35	10.5	
Long	Morrison	Sullivan	120	63	35	10	
Long	Morrison	Upsala	129	129		7.6	
Long	Otter Tail	Vergas	1,273	529	128		
Long	Otter Tail	Dalton	350	236	88	9.5	
Long	Otter Tail	Ottertail	1,173	1,170	17		
Long	Otter Tail	Weetown	293	272	17	3.5	
Long	Otter Tail	Fergus Falls	756	306	73	8	
Long	Ramsey	New Brighton	183		30		
Long	Sherburne	Clear Lake	174	144	26	6	
Long	St. Louis	Makinen	395	395	14	2	
Long	St. Louis	Crane Lake	409	319	18	5	
Long	St. Louis	Chisholm	267	126	36	5.7	
Long	St. Louis	Cotton	209	88	51	11.5	
Long	Stearns	Clearwater	68	33	38	10	
Long	Stearns	Richmond	460	304	35	3.5	
Long	Stevens	Cyrus	579	579	12	1.5	
Long	Todd	Burtrum	372	79	63	12	
Long	Todd	Sauk Centre	215	65	36		
Long	Washington	Maple Island	71	71	12	6.2	
Long	Wright	Monticello	96	58	35	5	
Long	Wright	Oster	80	80		3.1	
Long	Wright	Silver Creek	46	46	9	7.2	
Long Pond	Sherburne	Lake Fremont	40	40		4.3	
Long Pond	Stearns	Freeport	14	14	7	4	
Long Quarry	St. Louis	Ridge	110	110	96	40	
Longs	Morrison	Cushing	58	58		9.8	
Long (North)	Crow Wing	Merrifield	5,998	3,905	97	15.3	18037200
Long Lost	Clearwater	Zerkel	390	275	63	18	
Longyear	St. Louis	Chisholm	158	155	18	4.3	
Lookout	Morrison	Randall	17	17			
Loon	Crow Wing	Crosby	60	32	20	7	
Loon	Hubbard	Park Rapids	82	33	50	16	
Loon	Itasca	Grand Rapids	235	48	69	12	
Loon	Jackson	Jackson	679	679	7	2.7	
Loon	Otter Tail	Vergas	1,048	592	105	14.4	
Loon	St. Louis	Aurora	290	70	85	18	
Loon	St. Louis‡	Crane Lake	2,169	2,165	65	20	69047000
Loon	Waseca	Waseca	122	122	9		
Loon	Washington	Grant	62	62	17	2.3	
Lory	Isanti	Dalbo	212	197	21	3.2	
Lost	Hennepin	Osseo	20	20	6		
Lost	St. Louis	Tower	768	730	20	5	
Lost	Washington	Mahtomedi	22	7	26	7	
Lotus	Carver	Chanhassen	246	182	29		
Louisa	Murray	Westbrook	298	298	8	0.5	
Louisa	Stearns	Fairhaven	189	122	44	7.5	
Louise	Douglas	Alexandria	219	99	33	12	
Louise Mill Pond	Mower	Leroy	15	15	8	1.5	
Louise	Mower	Le Roy	26	26	8	1.3	
Lovell	Stearns	St. Rosa	85	85	18	1	
Lower Bottle (Lower)	Hubbard	Dorset	652	311	110	12.5	
Lower Lasalle	Hubbard	Becida	221	213	16	6	
Lower Panasa	Itasca	Calumet	248	169	25	2.6	
Lower Rattling Springs	Goodhue	Etter	132	132	8	6	
Lower Spunk	Stearns	Avon	280	232	27.5	7.5	
Lower Sucker	Cass	Cass Lake	585	301	35	7	
Lower Twin	Wadena	Menahga	391	175	26	3.5	
Lower Watab	Stearns	St. Joseph	12	12	26	12	
Lucy	Carver	Chanhassen	92	86	20	5	
Ludlow Pit	Beltrami	Waskish	7	7	17	11	
Lueken	Stearns	Richmond	12	12	13	6.5	
Lund	Meeker	Grove City	123	123		2.6	
Lund Brothers Marsh	Becker	Lake Park	36	36	8	2.3	
Lundberg Slough	Sherburne	Orrock	13	13		2.5	
Lura	Blue Earth	Mapleton	1,224	1,224	9		
Luverne Pit	Rock	Luverne	10	10	7	1.5	
Lydia	Meeker	Crow River	12	12			
Lyman	Rice	Northfield	7	7	7		
Lynden	Stearns	Fairhaven	16	16	23	14	
Lynden	Stearns	Lynden	204	204	8	5	
Lyons WMA	Lyon	Russell			5		
Mabel	Cass	Remer	183	191	14	11.7	
Mabel	Le Sueur	Doyle	105	105	18	2	
Mack	Otter Tail	Otter Tail			6		
Madaline	Morrison	Cushing	31	31		9.1	
Madden	Lake	Ely	33	28	24	10.5	
Madison	Blue Earth	Madison Lake	1,113	722	59	4	
Magda	Hennepin	Brooklyn Park	13	13	11	3	
Magnetic	Cook‡	Maple Hill	446	95	90	17	
Magnus	Pope	Terrace	71	71	12	3.9	
Mahlke Marsh	Lyon	Russell	49	49	11	1.6	
Mahnomen	Crow Wing	Trommald	238	190	25	14	
Mahnomen Mine #1	Crow Wing	Crosby	103	103		12.1	
Mahnomen Mine #2	Crow Wing	Crosby	17	17		13.4	
Mahnomen Mine #3	Crow Wing	Crosby	16	16		14.4	
Mahnomen, Alstead & Arco	Crow Wing	Crosby	271	53	525	30.3	
Mahoning Hull-RustComplex	St. Louis	Hibbing	869	869		11.8	
Main	Dakota	Cedar Grove	5	5	10	5.6	
Maine	Otter Tail	Maine	37	37	14	4.3	
Maine	Otter Tail	Maine	88	35	34	12.9	
Maingan	Lake	Winton	29	29		5.9	
Mains	Wright	Highland					
Majestic	St. Louis	Wolf	52	30	51	7.9	
Maki	Itasca	Suomi	19	19		6.9	
Makwa	Lake	Prairie Portage	128	49	76	10.8	
Malachy	Swift	Clontarf	43	43	6	1.3	
Malardi	Wright	Montrose	107	107	11	10.2	
Malberg	Lake	Isabella	398	309	37	7	
Mallard	Aitkin	Aitkin	417	417	5		
Mallard	Becker	Elbow Lake Village	129	129	12	2	
Mallard	Clearwater	Mallard	104	77	17	8.2	
Mallard	Crow Wing	Fifty Lakes	19	19	8	5.9	
Mallard	Crow Wing	Lake Hubert	61	61	6	4.6	
Mallard	Itasca	Cohasset	11	11	12	5.6	
Mallard	Morrison	Randall	18	18			
Mallard	Pine	Markville	31	31	5		
Mallard Marsh	Ramsey						
Mallard Pass	Wright	Howard Lake	44	44	8	5.6	
Mallard Pond (North)	Ramsey	North Oaks	14	14	4		
Mallard Pond (South)	Ramsey	North Oaks	6	6	4		
Mallen Pit	Crow Wing	Riverton	5	0	95	28	
Malmedal	Pope	Lowry	198	198	10	1	
Mandall	Chisago	Stark	47	25	26	2	
Mandy	Aitkin	East Lake	93	93	11	3.9	
Manganika	St. Louis	Virginia	158	141	24	2	
Mann	Washington	Withrow	55	55	18	3.6	
Manomin	Beltrami	Wilton	265	265	11	3	
Manomin	Lake	Prairie Portage	409	403	18	2.5	
Manor Woods	Olmsted	Rochester	45	45	26	12	
Mantrap (Big)	Hubbard	Emmaville	1,556	752	68	13	
Mantrap (Little)	Hubbard	Park Rapids	348	197	54	11.5	
Manuel Mine	Crow Wing	Crosby	35	35	160	28	
Manuella	Meeker	Darwin	286	114	51	8.8	
Manuella NPSA	Meeker	Darwin	9	9	8	3	
Many Point	Becker	Ponsford	1,737	565	92	10.5	
Manymoon	Cook	Lutsen	24	24	6.5	5	
Martha	Wright	Hanover	93	72	22	6.5	
Maple	Cass	Longville	76	0	45	7.9	
Maple	Clay	Norwegian Grove	44	44		2	
Maple	Crow Wing	Bay Lake	71	71	23	7.2	
Maple	Douglas	Forada	815	387	78	14.5	
Maple	Itasca	Hill City	39	39		4.6	
Maple	Itasca	Marcell	228	76	39	11	
Maple	Meeker	Stockholm	138	138	7	2.3	
Maple	Polk	Mentor	1,477	1,477	14		
Maple	Todd	Little Sauk	367	150	23		
Maple	Wright	Maple Lake	777	396	76	8.8	
Maple Leaf	St. Louis	Alborn	99	48	51	5.9	
Maple Unit	Wright	Maple Lake	8	8	7	4	
Marabaeuf	Cook	Grand Marais	859	0	55	10.5	
Marble	Itasca	Marcell	151	151	12	4.9	
Marble	Lake	Silver Bay	159	155	20	6.2	
Marcott	Dakota	Wescott	12	12		4.6	
Marcott	Dakota	Wescott	10	10		5.6	
Marcott	Dakota	Wescott	19	18	27	5.6	
Marcott	Dakota	Wescott	17	17	33	7.5	
Mareks	Le Sueur	Le Center	25	25			
Margaret	Cass	Outing	18	10	49	7.6	
Margaret	Cass	Nisswa	247	64	26	7	
Margaret	Cook	Hovland	6	3	29	11	
Marget	Isanti	East Lake Francis Shores	91	91	9	4.6	
Margritte	Sherburne						
Maria	Carver	Belle Plaine	130	130	6	0.3	
Maria	Clay	Muskoda	111	111	10	0.7	
Maria	Murray	Garvin	288	288	10	2.6	
Maria	Otter Tail	Maine	46	46		1	
Maria	Stearns	Clearwater	78	64	18	3	
Maria	Stearns	New Munich	97	60	45	4	
Maria	Wright	Silver Creek	24	24		3.4	
Marie	Itasca	Bigfork	50	40	48	3.9	
Marie	Itasca	Rosy	55	55		4.3	
Marie	Stearns	Greenwald	16	16	15	6	
Marie	Stearns	Fairhaven	145	107	36	5	
Marietta Kids Fishing Pond	Lac qui Parle	Marietta					
Marin	Clay	Hawley	108		9	1.5	
Marion	Cass	Outing	11	5	60	11.1	
Marion	Dakota	Lakeville	560	454	21	10.5	
Marion	Hennepin	Woodland	15	15		12.1	
Marion	McLeod	Brownton	594	594	12		
Marion	Otter Tail	Richville	1,664	685	62	12	
Marion	St. Louis	Crane Lake	182	182	13	9	
Mark	Cook	Grand Marais	126	140	5	4	
Markee	Crow Wing	Lake Hubert	103	77	33		
Markham	St. Louis	Markham	264	238	29	2.5	
Markgrafs	Washington	Woodbury	44	44	8	4.7	
Marquette	Beltrami	Bemidji	504	285	51		
Marsh	Big Stone	Correll	4,500	4,500	5	0.6	6000100
Marsh	Carver	Augusta	139	139		8.5	
Marsh	Cook	Covill	16	16	5		
Marsh	Cook	Tofte	66	66	13	5.2	
Marsh	Hennepin	Bloomington	14	14	5	5	
Marsh Pond	Sherburne	Santiago					
Marshall	Becker	Audubon	190	105	21	5.3	
Marshall	Cook	Maple Hill	56	50	16	8.5	
Marshall	Lyon	Dudley	247	247		1.3	
Marshan	Anoka	Lino Lakes	202	202	3.5	2	
Martha	Chisago	Chisago City	22	22	12	1.6	
Martha	Ramsey	Shoreview					
Martha	Wright	Hanover	93	72	22	6.5	
Martin	Anoka	Wyoming	234	140	20	1.5	
Martin	Martin	Northrop	277	277	3	1	
Martin	St. Louis	Paupores	67	24	77	5.6	
Marty	Stearns	Marty	156	156	7	4	
Marvin	Roseau	Longworth	165	165	9	0.7	
Mary	Crow Wing	Emily	380	126	34	4	
Mary	Douglas	Alexandria	2,371	1,020	40	5.5	21009200
Mary	Hennepin	Shorewood					
Mary	Hubbard	Lake Itasca	53	18	41	14.8	
Mary	Itasca	Bengal	106	106	7	4.3	
Mary	Itasca	Marcell	211	95	45	6.6	
Mary	Kandiyohi	Norway Lake	99	99	12	1.6	
Mary	Le Sueure	Lexington	48	48	9	3	
Mary	McLeod	Brownton	86	86	5	1.6	
Mary	Meeker	Manannah	98	98	6	3	
Mary	Otter Tail	Rose City	191	191		4.6	
Mary	Pope	Starbuck	92	92	13	1	
Mary	Todd	Upsala	129	39	58	8.5	
Mary	Watonwan	Echols	127	127		1.3	
Mary	Wright	Buffalo	335	335	9	1.6	
Mary	Wright	Maple Lake	38	38		6.6	
Mary	Wright	Maple Lake	209	82	102	5.5	
Mary	Wright	Oster	189	85	46	6.3	
Mary	Wright	Winsted	196	84	47	6.5	
Mary Yellowhead	Becker	Richwood	39	39	9	7.5	
Masford	Sherburne	Clear Lake	76	76		5.6	
Mashkenode	St. Louis	Virginia	127	127	14	4	
Mason	Otter Tail	Clitherall	292	292		4.6	
Mason	Otter Tail	Elizabeth	153	153		1.6	
Masterman	Washington	Duluth Junction	31	31	12	6	
Matala	Wright	Silver Creek					
Mattlia	Carlton	Wright	71	71		5.6	
Mattson	Chisago	Chisago City	60	60	9	4.3	
Mattson	Douglas	Farwell	232	232	12	1.3	
Maud	Becker	Audubon	547	300	32	10	
Maude	St. Louis	Buyck	94	66	26	2.5	
Mauritz	Stearns	Farming	8	8	7	2	
Mavis	Cook	Grand Marais	9	3	55	18.8	
Maxim	Wright	Albion Center	45	42	18	4	
Maxine	St. Louis	Ely	38	38	21	18	
May	Cass	Walker	143	74	59	14.5	
May	Itasca	Bigfolk	65	65	15	3.6	
Maydole Logan	Aitkin	Palisade	31	31	11		
Mayfield	Clay	Rollag	38	38	10	5.6	
Mayhew	Benton	Mayhew	131	66	20	5.5	
Mayhew	Cook	Grand Marais	220	33	84	20.1	
Maynard	Meeker	Darwin	81	81		3.3	
Mayo	Crow Wing	Pequot Lakes	155	147	22	7	
Mayo Pond	Olmsted	Rochester	33	33		6.6	
Mayowood	Olmsted	Golden Hill	38	38	7	3.3	
Mays	Washington	Maple Island	50	23	25	8.9	
Maxim	Wright	Albion Center	45	42	18	2.2	
Mazaska	Rice	Shieldsville	685	336	50	2.3	
McAvity	Itasca	Grand Rapids	137	101	29	15	
McColl Pond	Scott	Savage	22	21	11	6.4	
McCormack	St. Louis	Chisholm	54	21	25	6.9	
McCormic	Stearns	Sauk Centre	180	180	12	6	
McCoy	Hennepin	Eden Prairie	11	11	10	3.7	
McCraney	Mahnomen	Nay-tah-waush	268	107	43	11	
McDonald (Big)	Otter Tail	Perham	935	368	46	10.2	
McDonald (Little)	Otter Tail	Perham	1,174	413	109	19.1	
McFarland	Cook	Hovland	384	203	49	15.5	
McKenney	Stearns	Melrose	26	26	16	1	
McKinney	Itasca	Grand Rapids	115	99	34	5.5	
McMahon	Scott	Credit River	162	157	14	4.5	
McQuade	St. Louis	Hibbing	164	157	21	5	
Mead	Wright	South Haven					
Meadow	Morrison	Randall	17	17		9	
Meadow Road	Morrison	Lincoln					
Medicine	Beltrami	Tenstrike	446	308	44	5.9	
Medicine	Hennepin	Plymouth	886	399	49	5.5	
Meeds	Cook	Grand Marais	350	142	41		16030700
Melissa	Becker	Detroit Lakes	1,831	934	43	6.6	
Melrose	Wright	Enfield	58	58	26	3.8	
Melrose Mill Pond	Stearns	Melrose	72	72	9.5	5	
Mempin	Beltrami	Redby	125	91	23	6.3	
Mesaba Iron Range Pit #1	Itasca	Cohasset	177	177		5.9	
Mesaba Iron Range Pit #2	Itasca	Cohasset	125	125		7.5	
Mesaba Iron Range Pit #3	Itasca	Cohasset	24	24		6.6	
Mesaba Iron Range Pit #7	St. Louis	Hibbing	6	6		2.7	
Mesaba Iron Range Pit #8	St. Louis	Hibbing	11	11		5.1	
Mesaba Iron Range Pit #9	St. Louis	Hibbing	19	19		8.3	
Metty Marsh	Murray	Dovray					
Meyer	Clay	Hitterdahl	108		7	1.5	
Meyers	Stearns	Richmond	27	27	38	3	
Micmac	Lake	Finland	136	131	20	11.5	
Michaels	Morrison	Fort Ripley	66	66		5.2	
Middle	Otter Tail	Battle Lake	194	100	56	17.5	
Middle Cormorant	Becker	Lake Park	360	144	40	11.5	
Middle Crooked	Hubbard	Nevis	294	260	33	14	
Middle Leaf	Otter Tail	Ottertail	398	181	43	12	
Middle Mahnomen	Crow Wing	Crosby	145	145		2.3	
Middle Spunk	Stearns	Avon	236	80	81	10	
Midge	Hubbard	Bemidji	521	496	24	17	
Mile	Cass	Baxter	77	77	11	6.2	
Milford	Crow Wing	Wolford	64	64	69	11	
Milky	Wright	Howard Lake	31	31		3.7	
Mill	Douglas	Alexandria	600	240	40	11.5	
Mill Pond	Benton	Rice					
Mill Pond	Mower	Austin	18	17	17	3.6	
Mille Lacs	Mille Lacs	Garrison	132,516	33,129	42		
Miller	Carver	Benton	142	142	14	1.5	
Miller	Meeker	Crow River	83	83		1.5	
Miller	Morrison	Randall	21	21		5.5	
Miller Pit West	St. Louis	Aurora	17	4	174	31	
Millers	Morrison	Cushing	14	14	6	2	
Millman	Carver	Lyndale	21	21	11	4.6	
Millstone	Wright	Silver Creek	199	199	8.5	2.92	
Millwood	Stearns	Melrose	39	39	8	5	
Miltona	Douglas	Miltona	5,838	2,802	105	9.5	
Mina	Douglas	Alexandria	424	178	123	11.5	
Minard	Anoka	East Bethel	138		7		
Miner's Pit	St. Louis	Ely	141	25	140	14	
Minerva	Clearwater	Alida	236	218	16	9	
Minisogama	Itasca	Pennington	124	124	14	4.3	
Mink	Wright	Buffalo	93	57	36	4	
Mink	Wright	Maple Lake	301	276	39	2.7	
Minnehaha Marsh	Hennepin	Oak Knoll	4	4	8	7	
Minnesota Lake	Faribault	Minnesota Lake	1,911		20		
Minnesota Slough	Houston	Cee Jefferson	9,600	9,600	22	4	
Minnetonka	Hennepin	Minnetonka	14,004	5,849	113	10.9	
Minett-Kranz Reservoir	Pipestone	Ruthton	10	9	22.5	5	
Minnewashta	Carver	Chanhassen	738		70	13.5	
Minnewaska	Pope	Glenwood	7,110	2,140	32	7	
Minnewawa	Aitkin	McGregor	2,512	2,286	21	3	
Minni-Car-Car	Itasca	Inger	27	27	22	10.5	
Minni R6	Yellow Medicine	Canby	2	2	10	5	
Minnie	Stearns	Avon	26	9	57	9	
Minnie Belle	Meeker	Litchfield	545	169	49	16	
Minntac-West Pit	St. Louis	Mountain Iron	3,000	3,000	36	18	
Misplaced	Cook	Maple Hill	26	26	18	15	
Mission (Lower)	Crow Wing	Merrifield	698	452	27		
Mission (Upper)	Crow Wing	Merrifield	817	256	36	14	
Mitawan	Lake	Isabella	185	105	24	15	
Mitchell	Crow Wing	Emily	439	118	78	8	
Mitchell	Hennepin	Eden Prairie	112	109	19	3.5	
MNDOT Pond	Wright	Buffalo					
Moe	Meeker	Atwater	23	23	8	4	
Molly Stark	Otter Tail	Battle Lake	152	63	48	11.3	
Moonan Marsh	Waseca						
Mooney	Hennepin	Plymouth	118		10		
Morroco Mine	Crow Wing	Trommald	78	14	265	26	
Moore	Wright	Rockford	179	179	14	1.9	
Moose	Itasca	Northome	357	93	52	9	
Moose	Lake	Ely	1,300	262	65	13	
Moosehead	Carlton	Moose Lake	292	261	18	4	
Moses	Douglas	Millerville	822	399	32	12.5	
Mosomo	Itasca	Max	48	19	30	9.5	
Mott Pit	St. Louis	Mountain Pit	17	17	80	11	
Mound	Todd	Burtrum	273	88	57	13.5	
Mountain	Cottonwood	Mountain Lake	241	241	8	2	
Movil	Beltrami	Bemidji	923	513	50	6.2	
Mow	Hubbard	Akeley	106	60	34	5.2	
Mud	Cass	Hackensack	41	18	9	6	
Mud	Lac qui Parle	Rosen	77	77	10	9.8	
Mud	Meeker	Crow River					
Mud	Meeker	Forest City	135	135		3.7	
Mud	Morrison	Belle Prairie	55	55		6.1	
Mud	Morrison	Flensburg	86	86		5.7	
Mud	Morrison	Fort Ripley	16	16		6.9	
Mud	Morrison	Harding	29	29		2.4	
Mud	Morrison	Lincoln	62	62		7.0	
Mud	Morrison	Pillager	170	170		5.2	
Mud	Morrison	Sobieski	34	34		3.6	
Mud	Morrison	Vawter	14	14		4.8	
Mud	Otter Tail	Perham	305	305	10	1.4	
Mud	Sherburne	Crown	11	11		1.6	
Mud	Sherburne	Elk River	7	7		4.2	
Mud	Stearns	Farming	112	112	12	3	
Mud	Stearns	Freeport	17	17	14	3	
Mud	Stearns	Marty	66	60	12	5.4	
Mud	Stearns	Richmond	66	66	18	7	
Mud	Stearns	Richmond	30	30	6	3	
Mud	Stearns	Richmond	42	42	5	1	
Mud	Stearns	Richmond	30	30	8	6	
Mud	Stearns	St. Rosa	34	34	16	7	
Mud	Stearns	Waite Park	35	35	9	1	
Mud	Kandiyohi	New London	2,318	2,318	14	5.4	
Mud	Traverse	Wheaton	1,640	1,640	6.5	4	
Mud	Washington	Maple Island	59	59	9	2	
Mud	Washington	Maple Island	9	9	8	2	
Mud	Wright	Albright	56	29	65	5	
Mud	Wright	Hanover	77	77	6	5.3	
Mud	Wright	Maple Lake	125	125		2.7	
Mud	Wright	Monticello	32	16	37	4.5	
Mud	Wright	Rassat	56	56		4.1	
Mud	Wright	Rockford	27	27		3.3	
Mud Hen	Dakota	Etter	174	174	10	2	
Mukooda	St. Louis	Crane Lake	754	151	78	12	
Mule	Cass	Longville	456	182	47	15.5	
Mund	Stearns	Clearwater	21	21	18	4	
Murphy	St. Louis	Central Lakes	395	261	24	4.1	
Murray	Stearns	Kimball	45	45	21	5.9	
Mush	Cook	Maple Hill	27	27	16	6	
Muskrat	Morrison	Fort Ripley					
Muskrat	Morrison	Fort Ripley	25	25		6	
Myrtle	St. Louis	Orr	889	862	20	10.5	
Nagel	Itasca	Cohasset	87	87		2	
Namakan	St. Louis ‡	Ray	24,066	5,026	150	10.7	
National Steel (NSPC) Pit #1	St. Louis	Kelly Lake	37	37		5	
National Steel (NSPC) Pit #2	St. Louis	Kelly Lake	61	61		5	
Nelson	Becker	Lake Park	241	236	16	7	
Nelson	Meeker	Atwater	25	25		8.5	
Nelson	Pope	Glenwood	403	403	9	4.5	
Nelson Marsh	Chisago						
Nelson's Marsh	Murray						
Nest	Kandiyohi	Spicer	945	525	40	9.8	
Net	Becker	White Earth	213	134	47	6.5	
Net	Pine	Nickerson	136	136	15	3.7	
Nevens Pond	Wright	Annandale	6	6	14	8	
Newfound	Lake	Ely	643	119	45	7.7	
Newman	Hubbard	Bemidji	45	13	63	15.3	
Nichols	St. Louis	Payne	413	362	31	5.1	
Nine Mile	Hennepin	Port Cargill	38	38	8	6	
Ninemile	Lake	Schroeder	296	288	40	10	
Ninth Crow Wing	Hubbard	Akeley; 46°58′40″N 94°46′09″W	227	95	65	9.5	
Nipisiquit	Lake	Illgen City	58	29	21	10.5	
Nixon	Wright	Hasty	59	33	67	8.2	
Nokay	Crow Wing	Brainerd	660	218	42	8	
Nokomis	Hennepin	Minneapolis	204	100	33	2	
Noma	Itasca	Wirt	60	27	47	12.5	
Nora WMA	Pope		46	46		4.6	
Nord	Aitkin	Aitkin	412	272	29	10.5	
Normandale	Hennepin	Bloomington	102	102	12	4.9	
Normandy Pond	Morrison	Randall	6	6			
North	Goodhue	Etter	1,548	1,548	13	2	
North	Stearns	Albany	71	71	9	3	
North	Wright	Monticello	75	75	27	6.9	
North	Wright	Silver Creek	33	33		3.9	
North Baker	Stevens	Cyrus	30	30	10	4	
North Bay	Sherburne	Santiago					
North Berthiaume	Wright	Buffalo	23	19	43	12	
North Browns	Stearns	Eden Valley	324	130	41	4.5	
North Goose	Washington	Lake Elmo	6	6	12	3	
North Hegman	St. Louis	Ely	70	60	30	7.5	
North Lark	Lake	Ely	3	0	24	9	
North Lida	Otter Tail	Pelican Rapids	5,564	2,380	58	7	
North Long Pit	St. Louis	Ridge	222	222	112	33	
North Marsh	Lac qui Parle	Clarkfield	40	40		10.5	
North Marsh	Murray	Current Lake	43	43	9	2	
North Maughan	Stevens	Morris	45	45	7	4.3	
North Star	Itasca	Marcell	1,059	314	90	12.9	
North Skinny Pit	St. Louis	Ridge	32	32	60	35	
North Star	St. Louis	Hibbing	39				
North Tamarack	Becker	Rochert	1,442	1,389	17	5.5	
North Ten Mile	Otter Tail	Fergus Falls	745	745	14	2	
North Turtle	Otter Tail	Underwood	1,484	1,454	19	9.6	
North Twin	Beltrami	Turtle River	313	138	59	16	
North Twin	Itasca	Marble	250	73	42	11	
North Twin	Mahnomen	Nay-tah-waush	901	900	16	9	
North Twin	Morrison	Lincoln	41	41		10.5	
North Twin	Wright	Buffalo	48	24	58	14.5	
North Wolf	Stearns	Melrose	18	18	14	3	
Northern Light	Cook	Grand Marais	433	433	7.5	6	
Norway	Kandiyohi	Sunburg	2,344	2,152	33	7.2	
Norway	Otter Tail	Underwood	384	242	19	3.6	
No-Ta-She-Bun (Willow)	Itasca	Remer	238	72	45	20	
Nyrocha Flats WMA	Lyon	Florence	31	31	5	1	
O'Brien Reservoir	Itasca	Nashwauk	538	538	63	12	
O'Donald	Morrison	Sobieski	26	26		4.8	
O'Dowd	Scott	Shakopee	258	235	22	1.8	
O'Reilly	Itasca	Taconite	189	56	79	13	
Oak	Pine	Duquette	442	433	20	2.5	
Ochotto	Stearns	Avon	40	22	40	14.5	
Ojibway	Lake	Ely	371	134	115	16	
Okabena	Nobles	Worthington	776		15.3		
Okamanpeedan	Martin	Ceylon	2,294	2,294	6.5	1.5	
Oliver	Swift	Appleton	416	300	35	5	
Olson	Stevens	Cyrus	425	425	20	2	
Onamia	Mille Lacs	Onamia	1,043	1,040	10	4.5	
One Pine	St. Louis	Ely	363	363	13	5	
Orchard	Dakota	Lakeville	234	177	33	8.8	
Ore-be-gone	St. Louis	Gilbert	140	140	433		
Orono	Sherburne	Elk River	300	281	18	1	
Ortman	Morrison	Lastrup					
Orwell	Otter Tail	Fergus Falls	782	626	25	4.7	
Osakis	Todd	Osakis	6,270	3,146	73	3.5	
Oscar	Douglas	Holmes City	1,040	750	25	6	
Otter	Stearns	Fairhaven	91	32	51	8.5	
Otter	Wright	Maple Lake	41	41	28	4.3	
Otter Tail	Otter Tail	Ottertail	13,725	6,468	120	10.5	
Overlook	Morrison	Randall					
Owasso	Ramsey	Shoreview	384	293	37	7	
Owen	Itasca	Bigfork	257	187	34	17	
Ox Yoke	Cass	Backus	166	88	42	12	
Oxbow	Aitkin	Palisade	21	21	7		
Oxbow	Aitkin	Palisade	11	11	14		
Oxbow	Aitkin	Libby	25	25	6		
Ozawindib	Clearwater	Lake Itasca	151	63	80	17	
Paco	Lake	Prairie Portage	19	19	5	5	
Paddy Pond	Stearns	St. Martin	2	2	6	2	
Page	Stevens	Hancock	372	171	17	7	
Palmer	Hennepin	Brooklyn Center	25	25	8	5	
Pancore	Cook	Tofte	31	17	38	15.7	
Park	Carlton	Mahtowa	375	375	16	9.2	
Parkers	Hennepin	Plymouth	100	67	37	11.5	
Parley	Carver	Waconia	242	231	18	6	
Pasture Pond	Stearns	Cold Spring	8	8	9	1	
Patch	Stearns	Cold Spring	23	23	12	6	
Patridge Quarry	St. Louis	Ridge	300	300	115	36	
Paul	Otter Tail	Perham	319	109	81	23	
Pauman	Wright	Maple Lake					
Pearl	Becker	Detroit Lakes	237	168	54	7	
Pearl	Stearns	Cold Spring	733	511	17	3.7	
Peavy	Morrison	Sullivan	123	45	63	16.2	
Pelican	Crow Wing	Breezy Point	8,253	3,910	104	19.5	
Pelican	Grant	Ashby	3,932	3,460	21	4	
Pelican	Otter Tail	Pelican Rapids	3,986	1,625	55	6.4	
Pelican	Pope	Glenwood	519	416	34	6	
Pelican	St. Louis	Orr	11,546	5,879	38	9.5	
Pelican	Stearns	St.Anna	337	135	46	13.5	
Pelkey	Morrison	Little Falls	96	96	7	2.3	
Peltier	Anoka	Centerville	465	412	18	2.8	
Pennington Mine	Crow Wing	Ironton	46	7	259	29	
Pepin	Goodhue	Lake City	25,060	8,060	60		
Pequaywan	St. Louis	Rollins	418	240	33	9.5	
Perch	Lincoln	Ivanhoe	224	180	16.2	2	
Perch	St. Louis	Chisholm	339	170	30	11	
Perch	Morrison	Lincoln	88	65	24	10.7	
Perent	Lake	Isabella	1,800	1,368	28	6	
Perkins	Stevens	Morris	512	512	13	3.5	
Peterson	Crow Wing	Bay Lake	43	37	21	9	
Peterson	Meeker	Grove City	135	135	15	1.8	
Peterson	Wabasha	Midland Junction	446	446	16	6	
Phalen	Ramsey	Saint Paul	198	80	91	13	
Pickeral	Freeborn	Albert Lea	620	620	6	0.5	
Pickeral	Wright	French Lake	19	15	37	8	
Pickerel	Becker	Detroit Lakes	332	123	74	17.7	
Pickerel	Hubbard	Park Rapids	311	270	26	11.5	
Pickerel	Itasca	Effie	293	52	70	11	
Pickerel	Otter Tail	Maine	829	274	78	9	
Pickerel	Sherburne	Clear Lake	107	105	21	11.8	
Pickerel Slough	Goodhue	Etter	32	32	14	1.5	
Picket	St. Louis	Buyck	312	121	23	9	
Pierson	Carver	Victoria	235	119	40	5.4	
Pierz	Morrison	Genola	170	65	34	7.5	
Pigeon	Meeker	Dassel	286	286		1.7	
Pigeon	St. Louis	Rollins	28	28	26	14	
Pike	Cass	Cass Lake	4,760	2,238	95		
Pike	Cook	Grand Marais	810	218	45	17.5	
Pimushe	Beltrami	Pennington	1,268	654	40	5.8	
Pine (Big)	Aitkin	Cutler	614	259	78	11.5	
Pine (Little)	Aitkin	Aitkin	220	103	44	12.9	
Pine	Clearwater	Gonvick	1,188	1,188	15	6.5	
Pine	Crow Wing	Cross Lake	390	387	18	10	
Pine	Mahnomen	White Earth	103	103	12	7.8	
Pine	Morrison	Upsala	177	93	59	12.5	
Pine (Big)	Otter Tail	Perham	4,730	2,386	76	6	
Pine (Little)	Otter Tail	Perham	1,969	698	63	18.5	
Pine	St. Louis	Fairbanks	430	430	14	4	
Pine Island	Todd	Cushing	234	124	26	12	
Pine Mountain	Cass	Backus	1,567	737	80	7.3	
Pine Tree	Washington	Dellwood	120	109	31		
Pipe	Cook	Lutsen	284	156	33	13	
Pipe	Meeker	Cosmos	21	21		11.2	
Pirz	Stearns	Richmond	66	66	36	11	
Pit	Cook	Grand Rapids	24	24	17	7.1	
Pit 1	St. Louis	Hinsdale	282	282	120	36.5	
Pit 2E	St. Louis	Old Mesaba	300	300	99	36	
Pit 3	St. Louis	Old Mesada	94	94	128	19.9	
Pit 20	St. Louis	Ridge	20	20	40	20	
Pitts	Stearns	Avon	114	83	18	7.5	
Placid	Cass	Pillager	537	340	25	5	
Plantagenet	Hubbard	Bemidji	2,529	986	65	5.2	
Platte	Crow Wing	Sullivan	1,746	1,694	23	5	
Platte River Dam Pool	Morrison	Harding					
Pleasant	Cass	Hackensack	1,038	410	72	13	
Pleasant	Otter Tail	Underwood	370	235	38	13.5	
Pleasant	St. Louis	Eveleth	345	154	33	7	
Pleasant	Stearns	Pleasant Lake	222	100	33	8	
Pleasant	Wright	Annandale	509	260	74	11.5	
Pocket	Douglas	Lowry	275	138	40	8	
Pohl	Wright	Buffalo	38	38	9	2.0	
Pokegama	Itasca	Grand Rapids	6,612	1,978	112	19	
Pokegama	Pine	Pine City	1,474	903	25	3.3	
Polander	Morrison	Swanville	31	31		5.0	
Polander	Winona	Goodview	1,199	1,199	12	6	
Pomme de Terre	Grant	Erdahl	1,816	1,568	23	3	
Pomme de Terre Reservoir	Stevens	Morris	95	95		2.6	
Pomroy	Kanabec	Warman	412	412	11	4.2	
Ponto	Cass	Backus	347	102	60	17	
Pool 14	Sherburne	Orrock				3.5	
Pooles	Wright	Watertown	75	75		2.7	
Poor Farm	Aitkin	Aitkin	15	15	27	12	
Poplar	Ramsey	New Brighton	9	9	12	0.9	
Poplar	Ramsey	North Oaks	39	39	7	3.2	
Poplar	Polk	Lengby	75	39	23	8	
Poplar	Cook	Grand Marais	764	290	73	10.4	
Poposky	Beltrami	Bemidji	2,142	2,035	20		
Popp Slough	Mcleod	Jennie	35	35	7	4	
Popple	Morrison	Little Falls	25	25	7	3	
Popple	Cass	Whipholt	10	10	8	4	
Popple	Itasca	Togo	101	24	50	17.5	
Popple Pond	Morrison	Pierz					
Portage	Aitkin	McGregor	316	313	18	6	
Portage	Crow Wing	Trommald	75	22	31	9	
Portage	Hubbard	Park Rapids	412	410	17	2.8	
Portage	Otter Tail	Ottertail	265	148	49	14.2	
Porter	Meeker	Jennie	183	183		4.4	
Porter Reservoir	Lincoln	Porter	15	15	13	4.7	
Portsmouth Pit	Crow Wing	Crosby	121		450	21	
Potato	Hubbard	Park Rapids	2,100	426	87	9	
Pot Hole	St. Louis	Crane Lake	4	4	15		
Powderhorn	Hennepin	Minneapolis	11	9	24	1.7	27001400
Powers	Washington	Woodbury	58		41		
Prairie	Itasca	Grand Rapids	1,331	853	31	6.5	
Prairie	Otter Tail	Pelican Lake	1,016	801	22	11.9	
Prairie	Sherburne	Clear Lake	48	48		5.0	
Prairie	St. Louis	Floodwood	848	272	47	4	
Prairie Hill	Sherburne	Lake Fremont	26	26		5.2	
Prairie Ponds	Dakota	Farmington	12	11	12	5.9	
Preston	Renville	Buffalo Lake	670	670	11	2.7	
Prichard	Wabasha	Kellogg	215	215	12	6	
Prior (Lower)	Scott	Prior Lake	810	373	60	9.5	
Prior (Upper)	Scott	Prior Lake	354	329	50	3.5	
Pug Hole	Crow Wing	Outing	48	13	30	14.5	
Pugh	Morrison	Randall	21	21		8.6	
Pughole	Itasca	Grand Rapids	158	141	23	8.5	
Pulaski	Wright	Buffalo	702	122	87	8	
Pulaskis	Benton	Rice					
Quamba	Kanabec	Quamba	226	226	11	3.9	
Quarry	Scott	Shakopee	70	12	50	14	
Quinn	Stearns	Clearwater	21		31	9.5	
R4	Yellow Medicine	Canby	13	13	13.5	6	
R6	Yellow Medicine	Canby	33	33	14	5	
Rabbit	Aitkin	Glen	214	77	51	8	
Rabideau	Beltrami	Blackduck	577	515	112	14	
Rachel	Douglas	Holmes City	496	124	65	9	
Rainy (Note: Also partially in Ontario, Canada)	Koochiching ‡	International Falls	220,800	18,949	161		
Ramsey	Wright	Maple Lake	275	135	80	4	
Ramsey Mill Pond	Mower	Ramsey	53	52	18	1.9	
Ramsey Pond	Wright	Maple Lake					
Rassett	Crow Wing	Manganese	37	37	31	11	
Rat	Aitkin	Palisade	405	389	21	5.5	
Rat Root	Koochiching	International Falls	1,125	1,125	8		
Rausch	Stearns	Rockville	72	72	13	1	
Ravenna Pond	Dakota	Hastings	9	9	12	8	
Ravine	Washington	Langdon	19	19	16	5.6	
Raymond	Stearns	Padua	58	58	12	1	
Raymond Slough	Stearns	Padua	45	45	8	2.6	
Razor	Pine	Cloverdale	97	47	37	15	
Rebecca	Dakota	Hastings	81	81	15	1.9	
Rectangle Pond	Benton	Sartell					
Red (Lower)	Beltrami	Ponemah	180,999				
Red (Upper)	Beltrami	Waskish	107,832		18		
Red Lake River Reservoir	Pennington	Thief River Falls	96	75	18	2.5	
Red Oak	Stearns	Freeport	81	81	7	3	
Red Rock	Douglas	Kensington	708	595	22	13	
Red Wing Pottery Pond	Goodhue	Red Wing	8	8	13	8	
Reeds	Waseca	Elysian	187	110	58	12.5	
Reno	Crow Wing	Deerwood	167	167	9	9	
Reno	Pope	Alexandria	3,722	1,303	23	6.5	
Reservoir Number 4	Itasca	Nashwauk	102	10	41.5	10	
Reshanau	Anoka	Lino Lakes	336	336	16		
Rhine	Pine	Finlayson	111	111	8	5.8	
Rice	Anoka	Lino Lakes	442	442	5		
Rice	Crow Wing	Brainerd	434	202	25	6	
Rice	Faribault	Wells	266	266	4		
Rice	Hennepin	Maple Grove	314	314	12	2.5	
Rice	Itasca	Grand Rapids	857	229	68	14.7	
Rice	Morrison	Vawter	339	339	8	4	
Rice	Otter Tail	Vergas	350	350	8	3.3	
Rice	Sherburne	Briggs Lake	96	96		2.8	
Rice	Sherburne	Elk River					
Rice	Sherburne	Zimmerman	255	255		5.5	
Rice	Stearns	Eden Valley					
Rice	Stearns	Paynesville	1,639	958	41	4.6	
Rice	Wright	Buffalo					
Rice	Wright	Hasty	91	59	24	4.5	
Rice	Steele	Owatonna	697		5		
Rice	Wright	Dayton	45	45		2.8	
Rice	Wright	Lyndale	145	145		2.3	
Rice NPSA	Stearns	Richmond	12	12	6	6	
Rice Pond 2	Stearns	Eden Valley					
Riley	Hennepin	Eden Prairie	297	109	49	2.7	
Ring Pond	Wright	Enfield	17	17		4.9	
Ripley	Meeker	Litchfield	558	466	18	5.5	
Ripple	Aitkin	Aitkin	556	295	39		
Riverpointe Pond	Carver	Watertown	5	0	28	18	
Roberds	Rice	Shieldsville	625	393	43	1.5	
Roberts/Goering Pond	Wright	Hasty					
Robinson	Wabasha	Wabasha	808	808	12	6	
Roadside Pond	Stearns	Richmond					
Rock	Aitkin	McGregor	317	317	13	4.8	
Rock	Becker	Detroit Lakes	1,048	1,001	18	4	
Rock	Cass	Fairview	240		22	3.5	
Rock	Lyon	Russell	439	422	7.2	1	
Rock	St. Louis	Hibbing	2,128	2,128		1.3	
Rock	Pine	Markville	79	79	11	5.6	
Rock	Wright	Maple Lake	183	99	37	3.2	
Rocky	St. Louis	Ely	116	42	40	7	
Rockpile Pond	Stearns	Waite Park	8	8	6	6	
Rockville Pond	Stearns	Rockville	7	7	32	5	
Roe Mine	Crow Wing	Riverton	25	10	135	20	
Rolling	Stearns	Freeport	16	16	12	3	
Rolling Pit	St. Louis	Ridge	100	100	120	40	
Roschien	Stearns	Richmond	41	41	6	2	
Roosevelt	Cass	Outing	1,585	390	129	15.5	
Rose	Crow Wing	Klondyke	51	51	11	11	
Rose	Otter Tail	Vergas	1,190	465	137	9	
Rose	Cook‡	Grand Marais	1,315	408	90		
Roseau Sewage Treatment Pond #1	Roseau	Roseau	32	32		0.7	
Roseau Sewage Treatment Pond #2	Roseau	Roseau	32	32		2	
Roseau Sewage Treatment Pond #3	Roseau	Roseau	22	22		1.3	
Ross	Crow Wing	Emily	487	317	30	3.5	
Rossier	Stearns	St. Joseph	36	16	31	9	
Rossman	Becker	Lake Park	241	232	20	7	
Round	Aitkin	Tamarack	577	375	27		
Round	Aitkin	Aitkin	633	475	59	12	
Round	Aitkin	Garrison	767	322	125		
Round	Anoka	Anoka	266	266	15		
Round	Becker	Ponsford	1,087	473	69	10	
Round	Crow Wing	Nisswa	1,644	627	51		
Round	Hennepin	Eden Prairie	31	23	37	12	
Round	Itasca	Big Fork	502	239	40	11.5	
Round	Itasca	Squaw Lake	2,828	1,968	24	7	
Round	Jackson	Round Lake	1,024	1,024	9	1.1	
Round	Morrison	Harding	129	57	29	9	
Round	Morrison	Pillager	99	64	18	11.5	
Round	Morrison	Randall	127	95	20	15.2	
Round	Otter Tail	Ottertail	262	220	36	3.4	
Round	Sherburne	Clear Lake	35	23	43	7.5	
Round	Wright	Oster	45	34	28	2.0	
Roy	Mahnomen	Zerkel	653	638	16	6.5	
Ruby	Itasca	Grand Rapids	243	90	88	12	
Rush	Jackson	Jackson	293	293	3	0.7	
Rush	Otter Tail	Ottertail	5,338	3,325	68	4.5	
Rush	Cass	Baxter	50	50	12	6	
Rush	Sherburne	Clear Lake	160	160	11	1.9	
Rush (East)	Chisago	Rush City	1,359	1,033	24	2.4	
Rushmeyer	Crow Wing	Deerwood	41	0	26	8	
Rush (West)	Chisago	Rush City	1,464	862	42	3.1	
Ruth	Crow Wing	Emily	588	200	39	21	
Sabin	St. Louis	Aurora	305	135	40	3	
Sabre	Le Sueur	Cordova	263	263	13	7	
Sagamore Mine	Crow Wing	Riverton	117	56	210	32	
Saganaga	Cook‡	Grand Marais	17,593		280		
Sagatagan	Stearns	Collegeville	227	227	42	12	
Sallie	Becker	Detroit Lakes	1,246	577	50	6	
Salt (Note: Only alkaline lake in Minnesota.)	Lac qui Parle	Marietta	312				
Salter Pond	Itasca	Bass Brook	11	10	5	5	
Sand (Big)	Cass	Remer	736	635	23	8	
Sand (Little)	Cass	Remer	403	403	12	7	
Sand (Big)	Hubbard	Dorset	1,659	465	135	17.3	
Sand (Little)	Hubbard	Dorset	386	149	80	15.5	
Sand	Itasca	Squaw Lake	4,328	1,897	70	7.1	
Sand	Lake	Isabella	476	476	11	4.5	
Sand	Pine	Moose Lake	501	215	47	12.6	
Sand	St. Louis	Virginia	701	701	15	12	
Sand	Stearns	Albany	202	202	12	2.9	
Sand	Stearns	Richmond	65	65	11	3	
Sand Hill	Polk	Fosston	510	510	17	10	
Sandpit	Lake	Ely	61	17	53	19.8	
Sandy	Beltrami	Tenstrike	260	200	32	5.3	
Sandy	Sherburne	Crown	64	42	41	12	
Sandy	Wright	Annandale	74	74		2.7	
Sarah	Hennepin	Rockford	574	373	59	1.8	
Sarah	Murray	Garvin	1,093	1,093	11	2.5	
Sarah	Polk	Erskine	352	180	27	17	
Sauer	Becker	Detroit Lakes	212	84	39	11.5	
Sauk (Big)	Todd	Sauk Centre	2,094	1,389	59	4.1	
Sauk (Little)	Todd	Sauk Centre	268	161	29	6	
Sauk Pond	Stearns	Sauk Centre	7	7	8	30	
Saunders	Hennepin	Mound	70	70	15	1.9	
Savage	Ramsey	Little Canada	12	12	8	4.5	
Sawbill	Cook	Tofte	765	445	45	4.5	
Scalp	Otter Tail	Frazee	243	67	90	15.5	
Scandinavian	Pope	Terrace	424	237	49	10	
Scanlon Reservoir	Carlton	Scanlon	63	45	65	5.5	
Schmid	Stearns	Avon	38	20	34	11	
Schmidt	Wright	Buffalo	210	210		2.1	
Schneider	Stearns	Richmond	59	26	52	4.3	
School	Brown	Lake Hanska East	54	54	15	5.8	
School	Stearns	Saint Nicholas	102				
School	Stearns	Farming	65	65	5	2	
School	Wright	Albertville	62	62		1.8	
School	Wright	Saint Michael					
Schoolhouse	Meeker	Casey	55	55	16	7	
School Grove	Lyon	Cottonwood	318	318	11	1.5	
School Section	Stearns	Kimball	201	201	12	8	
School Section	Wright	Waverly	42	42		4.7	
Schroeder	Stearns	Munsion	18	18	62	8	
Schubert (East Bass)	St. Louis	Cotton	205	140	24	7.5	
Schultz	Meeker	Litchfield	48	48		4	
Schultz Slough	Stearns	Paynesville	27	27	12	4.3	
Schuman	Stearns	Avon	23	23	31	16	
Schutz	Carver	Victoria	105	40	49		
Schwinghammer	Stearns	Albany	19	19	16	6	
Scott	Wright	South Haven	82	52	23	2.9	
Scooty	Itasca	Nashwauk	167	77	75		
Scout	Stearns	Fairhaven	5	5	9	4	
Scugog	Stearns	Clearwater	48	48	8	6	
Sea Gull	Cook	Grand Marais	4,032	927	145	11.5	
Second Black Quarry	St. Louis	Ridge	320	320	376	42	
Section 6 Mine	Crow Wing	Trommald	14	2	172	31	
Section Pond	St. Louis	Crane Lake	35	35	10	10	
Sellards	Meeker	Dassel	97	97		2.5	
Serpent	Crow Wing	Deerwood	1,057	338	65	10	
Seventh Crow Wing	Hubbard	Nevis; 46°56′42″N 94°49′41″W	254	120	42	7	
Sewell	Otter Tail	Dalton	338	168	52	17	
Shackman	Stearns	Cold Spring	56	56	16	10	
Shagawa	St. Louis	Ely	2,344	711	48	8	
Shakopee	Mille Lacs	Onamia	675	675	15	5.7	
Skakopee	Wright	Lamson	153	153		2.6	
Shakopee Memorial Pond	Scott	Shakopee	14	14	3.2	2	
Shallow	Itasca	Warba	531	268	85	18.2	
Shallow Pond	Itasca	Alvwood	224	176	14	9	
Shamineau	Morrison	Motley	1,428	746	56	20	
Shamrock	Itasca	Taconite	50	18	55	14	
Shaokotan	Lincoln	Ivanhoe	995	995	10	2	
Sharp Muskrat	Dakota	Hastings	296	296	8	3	
Sheep	Morrison	Randall	20	20		8.2	
Sheldon	Wright	Hasty	49	15	43	10.5	
Shell	Becker	Snellman	3,140	3,070	16	4	
Shetek	Murray	Currie	3,596	3,596	10		
Shible	Swift	Appleton	340	340	8.5	2	
Shields	Rice	Shieldsville	872	658	42	8	
Shingobee	Hubbard	Akeley	171	43	40	12	
Shoal	Itasca	Nashwauk	286	114	77	13.5	
Shoal	Itasca	Grand Rapids	645	645	7	4	
Shoper-Bush Reservoir	Cottonwood	Jeffers	20	20	15	3.2	
Side	St. Louis	Chisholm	372	153	32	14	
Sina	Douglas						
Silver	Clay	Hawley	114	36	39	6	
Silver	Otter Tail	Frazee	247	224	34	4.7	
Silver	Olmsted	Rochester	50	34	11	1.3	
Silver	Sibley	Arlington	621	621	8	1	
Silver	Wright	Silver Creek	82	30	42	4	
Silver Creek Reservoir	Olmsted	Chester	106	106	45	3.5	
Silver Island	Lake	Isabella	1,102	1,102	15	7.5	
Siseebakwet (Sugar)	Itasca	Grand Rapids	1,306	292	105	9	
Sissabagama	Aitkin	Aitkin	365	219	37	6.5	
Six Mile	Cass	Bena	1,288	606	68	8.3	
Sixth Crow Wing	Hubbard	Nevis; 46°55′44″N 94°51′53″W	320	160	40	5.7	
Skindance	Lake	Ely	58	58	52	14.5	
Skinny Pit	St. Louis	Ridge	50	50	42	33	
Skogman	Isanti	Cambridge	226	135	36	3.8	
Skriebakken	Hennepin	Bloomington	5	5	7	3.6	
Skunk	Morrison	Vawter	315	315		5.0	
Skunk	Morrison	Vineland	32	32		4.1	
Slate	Lake	Isabella	294	294	7	2.7	
Sleepy Eye	Brown	Sleepy Eye; 44°18′26″N 94°44′2″W	277	203	21	2.5	
Slough	Wright	Monticello	46	46	9	5.2	
Slough	Wright	Silver Creek	24	24		4.8	
Slough	Wright	West Albion	30	30		4.7	
Small Quarry	St. Louis	Ridge	42	42	105	33	
Smetana	Hennepin	Eden Prairie	59	53	12	3	
Smith	Crow Wing	Garrison	441	181	54	13.5	
Smith	Douglas	Alexandria	575	270	30	3.5	
Smith	St. Louis	Brimson	180	74	51		
Smith	Wright	Cokato	243	243	5	2.7	
Smith Pond	Hennepin	Bloomington	7	8	16	3.5	
Smoke Lake	Cook	Tofte Township	158		20		
Snail	Ramsey	Shoreview	150	130	30	9	
Snider	Mahnomen	Nay-tah-waush	632	268	29	8	
Snodgrass	Wright	Hanover	65		9		
Snoshoe Mine	Crow Wing	Riverton	6	1	85	26	
Snowbank	Lake	Ely	3,303	879	150	21	
Snyder	Hennepin	Plymouth	10	10	16	1.0	
Somers	Wright	Maple Lake	158	128	21	2	
South Bean	Cook	Maple Hill	16	16	17	8.5	
South Berthiaume	Wright	Buffalo	19	12	73	10.5	
South Big Pine	Aitkin	Finlayson	372	96	28	9	
South Browns	Stearns	Richmond	46	46	12	6	
South Goose	Washington	Lake Elmo	33	33	18	1	
South Long (Lower)	Crow Wing	Brainerd	1,309	461	47	9	
South Long (Upper)	Crow Wing	Brainerd	802	283	47	7	
South Long Pit	St. Louis	Ridge	70	70	102	32	
South Maughan	Stevens	Morris	143	143		0.3	
South Stake	Becker	Lake Park	450	450	15	1.8	
South Sturgeon	Itasca	Chisholm	192	45	43	1.9	
South Turtle	Otter Tail	Underwood	630	398	35	15.8	
South Twin	Mahnomen	Waubun	1,000	525	29	7	
South Twin	Morrison	Lincoln	29	29		7.9	
South Twin	Stearns	Sauk Centre	54	54	12	9	
South Twin	Wright	Buffalo	43	35	19	1.5	
South Walnut	Faribault	Wells	392	392	2		
Spectacle	Isanti	Cambridge	239	157	51.5	11.7	
Spellman	Yellow Medicine	Clarkfield	189+	189+	7		
Spider	Hubbard	Nevis	544	405	96	15	
Spider	Itasca	Marcell	1,349	737	36	10.5	
Spider Mum Pond	Morrison	Genola					
Spirit	Aitkin	Bennettville	530	260	49	12	
Spirit (St. Louis River Estuary)	St. Louis	Duluth	10,255	10,242	55	3	
Spirit	Wadena	Menahga	115	65	45	8.3	
Spitzer	Otter Tail	Urbank	728	631	33	9	
Split Hand	Itasca	Grand Rapids	1,420	511	34	8.5	
Split Rock Reservoir	Pipestone	Pipestone	95	79	16	1.8	
Spoon	Lake	Winton	223	87	85	16	
Spoon	Ramsey	Maplewood	6	10	6		
Spotanski	Wright	Rockford	55	55		2.9	
Spring	Meeker	Dassel	218	165	30	4	
Spring	Polk	Lengby	136	44	35	6	
Spring	Scott	Prior Lake	580	290	37	2.3	
Spring	St. Louis	Crane Lake	194	49	60	15.5	
Spring	Wright	Cokato	54	54		2.5	
Spring Creek	Goodhue	Red Wing	181	181	14	8	
Spring Hole	St. Louis	Markham	1	1	16	7.2	
Spring North Mine Pit	St. Louis	Ridge	72	72	65	35	
Spring South Mine Pit	St. Louis	Ridge	120	120	125	35	
Square	Washington	Stillwater	195	65	68	2.1	
Stalker	Otter Tail	Underwood	1,280	575	95	7.5	
Staloch Pond	Wright	Monticello	16	16		4.3	
St. Anna	Stearns	St. Rosa	125	31	107	10.8	
Stanchfield	Morrison	Pillager	115	17	32	11.9	
Star	Meeker	Litchfield	557	557	15	2.9	
Star	Morrison	Sobieski	30	30		4.2	
Star	Todd	Lincoln	47	36	30	9	
Star	Otter Tail	Dent	4,721	2,813	94	11.4	
Star Pond	Benton	Foley					
Stark	Crow Wing	Emily	215		66	8	
Starvation	Morrison	Pine Center	19	19		6.8	
Stay	Lincoln	Arco	224	224	6	0.8	
Steamboat	Cass	Cass Lake	1,775	532	93	10	
Steele	Wright	Hanover	141	141	13	1.7	
Steep Bank	Lincoln	Hendricks	208	208	6.5	1	
Stella	Meeker	Darwin	553	226	75	5.6	
Stephens Settling Basin	St. Louis	Ridge	323	323	202	40	
Stevens	Cass	Longville	105	67	63	13	
Stevens	Meeker	Darwin	30	30		2.3	
Stewart	Lake	Two Harbors	248	247	24	10.3	
Stickney	Sherburne	Clear Lake	82	82	8	4.1	
Stingy	Itasca	Nashwauk	378	207	25	5.5	
Stinking	Becker	Lake Park	370	370	7	1.3	
Still	Morrison	Fort Ripley					
St. James Pit	St. Louis	Aurora	104	8	381	33	
Stockhaven Lake	Douglas	Evansville	482				
Stocking	Wadena	Menahga	343	326	22	5	
Stone	St. Louis	Rollins	206	196	17	7	
Stone	Sherburne	Crown	37	37		6.5	
Stone Axe	Itasca	Oslund	53	53	28	6	
Stony	Cass	Hackensack	595	178	50	22	
Stony	Lake	Isabella	227	227	4	3	
Stony	Morrison	Upsala	44	44	8	3.6	
Store	Polk	Fosston	49	46	19	4	
Stowe	Douglas	Brandon	366	366	14	4	
Straight	Becker	Osage	423	178	63	7	
Strand	Sherburne	Big Lake	12	12		5.0	
Strawberry	Becker	White Earth	1,522	563	40	18	
String Lakes	Cottonwood						
St. Rosa Pond	Stearns	St. Rosa					
Stuart	Otter Tail	Vining	699	405	49	24	
Stub	Stearns	Sauk Centre	61	61	13	5	
Stubler Pit	St. Louis	Buhl	13	1	40	17.5	
Stud	Morrison	Little Falls	14	14		6.2	
Stumpf	Stearns	Collegeville	72	72	36	11	
Sturgeon	Pine	Sturgeon Lake	1,405	495	40	8.7	
Sturgeon	St. Louis	Chisholm	1,664	667	80	14.5	
Sucker	Lake	Ely	393	178	31	9	
Sugar	Aitkin	Glen	398	267	45	13	
Sugar	Cass	Remer	664	325	44	3.4	
Sugar	Itasca	Cass Lake	1,585	1,268	22	9	
Sugar	Wright	Maple Lake	1,015	357	69	11	
Sugar Bush (Big)	Becker	Richwood	472	297	42	14.5	
Sugar Bush (Little)	Becker	Richwood	202	99	29	12.2	
Sullivan	Morrison	Harding	1,221	567	57		
Sullivan	Wright	Maple Lake	70	41	58	5.5	
Sunhigh	Cook	Forest Center	57	57		7.9	
Sunrise	Chisago	Lindstrom	742	712	21	2.7	
Sunset	Washington	White Bear Lake	124	124	17	5	
Sunset Pond	Dakota	Burnsville	44	41	10.5	5.7	
Superior (Note: 962,700 acres in Minnesota, Also partially in Wisconsin, Michigan, and Ontario, Canada)	Cook‡	Duluth	20,365,000		1,333		16000100
Susan	Carver	Chanhassen	87	75	17	2.3	
Susana	Cook	Maple Hill	2	2	9	6	
Swamp	Aitkin	Glen	273	273	5	4	
Swamp	Stearns	Melrose	26	26	17	2	
Swamp	Stearns	Watkins	23	23	20	7.3	
Swamp River Reservoir	Cook	Hovland	164	164	10	5.5	
Swan	Itasca	Pengilly	2,472	507	65	9.5	
Swan	McLeod	Silver Lake	343	343	10		
Swan	Nicollet	Nicollet	9,346		8.5		
Swan	Otter Tail	Fergus Falls	689	371	44	11.5	
Swan	Wright	Knapp	123	123		3.6	
Swartout	Wright	Annandale	285	285	11	2.0	
Swenson	Beltrami	Bemidji	388	136	76	17.5	
Sybil	Otter Tail	Vergas	706	423	74	13.5	
Sylvan	Morrison	Sylvan	321	190	31	6	
Sylvia (West & East)	Wright	South Haven	652	170	78	17	
Sylvia	Stearns	Grey Eagle	85	22	56	8	
Talcot	Cottonwood	Dundee	678	678	6	1	
Tamarac	Otter Tail	Pelican Rapids	392	392	11	6	
Tamarack	Becker	Rochert	1,431	1,389	17	3.5	
Tamarack	Carlton	Wright	228	176	48	5	
Tamarack	Morrison	Burtrum	30	30		2.3	
Tamarack	Morrison	Pillager	64	64		7.6	
Tamarack	Stearns	Brooten	344	344	7	3	
Tamarack	Stearns	St. Rosa	16	16	10	4	
Tamarack	Wright	Buffalo	61	46	26	3.4	
Tame Fish	Crow Wing	Deerwood	127	52	58	12	
Tanager	Hennepin	Orono	54	38	23		
Target	Houston						
Taylor	Wright	Highland	52	52		2.4	
Ten Mile	Cass	Hackensack	4,669	1,316	208	15.5	
Ten Mile	Otter Tail	Dalton	1,411	597	51	8	
Terrace Mill Pond	Pope	Terrace	9	9	15	6	
Tetonka	Le Sueur	Waterville	1,336	548	35	9	
Teufer	Koochiching	Northome	38	23	52		
Thein	Stearns	Richmond	35	12	47	6.0	
Thief	Marshall	Gatzke	6,172		7.5	3	
Third Crow Wing	Hubbard	Hubbard; 46°51′42″N 94°51′29″W	643	367	35	7	
Thirteen	Cass	Cass Lake	470	329	50	10	
Thistle Dew	Itasca	Togo	318	73	45	13	
Thoen	Meeker	Acton	259	259		1.9	
Thole	Scott	Shakopee	118	118	12	6.8	
Thole/Schneider	Scott	Shakopee	105	105	12	2	
Thompson	Cook	Grand Marais	18	18	12	8	
Thompson	Crow Wing	Pine Knoll	15	15		10.9	
Thompson	Dakota	West Saint Paul	8	7	8	3.5	
Thompson	Grant	Hoffman	153	73	22	4.6	
Thompson	Kandiyohi	Spicer	26	26		2.9	
Thompson	Meeker	Cosmos	225	225	8	1.5	
Thompson	Sherburne	Salida	84	63	22	6.8	
Thompson	St. Louis	Fredenberg	207	207	9	7.6	
Thomson Reservoir	Carlton	Thomson	389	283	22	26	
Thornton	Aitkin	Deerwood	216	203	21	9	
Three	Clay	Hawley	105		14	1.5	
Three Finger	Morrison	Randall					
Three Island	Beltrami	Turtle River	678	635	25	7.7	
Three Island	Itasca	Marcell	235	66	66	18	
Thunder Lake	Cass	Remer	1,330	226	95	20	
Tilde	Clay	Hitterdahl	259	259	13	2	
Timber	Jackson	Windom	198	198	8	0.9	
Tiny Pond	Stearns	Sauk Centre	3	3	2	0.3	
Tioga Mine Pit	Itasca	Cohasset	51	1	225	43	
Titicaca Pit	St. Louis	Ridge	310	310	222	32	
Titlow	Sibley	Gaylord	827		3.5	2	
Toad	Becker	Osage	1,716	561	29	5.3	
Toad Lily Pond	Morrison	Pierz					
Todd	McLeod						
Tofte	Lake	Ely	155	42	73	13	
Tom	Cook	Hovland	576	334	35	7.5	
Topaz	Lake	Prairie Portage	149	29	73	19	
Tornado	Lake	Isabella	25	25	7	2.8	
Towers	Meeker	Manannah	52	52		5.2	
Town Line	Cass	Longville	510	510	11	10.5	
Traverse	Traverse	Browns Valley	11,528	11,528	12		
Trelipe (Lower)	Cass	Longville	602	355	32	6	
Trelipe (Upper)	Cass	Longville	409	143	69	12.5	
Triangle	Lake	Ely	309	160	43	16	
Triangle Pond	Benton	Sartell					
Trillium Pond	Morrison	Pierz					
Triple Pond	Stearns	Eden Valley	18	18	12	0.5	
Troost Pond	Blue Earth	Mankato	3	3	45	9	
Trout	Cook	Grand Marais	257	59	77	17	
Trout	Itasca	Coleraine	1,890	438	135	14.5	
Trout	Itasca	Grand Rapids	1,753	386	157	10	
Trout Brook Pond	Sherburne	Elk River					
Trout Pond 1	Sherburne	Orrock					
Trout Pond 2	Sherburne	Orrock					
Trout Pond 3	Sherburne	Orrock					
Trowbridge	Otter Tail	Vergas	620	272	76	9.9	
Tschumperlin	Stearns	Richmond	25	25	11	6	
Tulaby	Mahnomen	Waubun	773	281	43	8.5	
Turner	Crow Wing	Crosby	56	26	36	13	
Turtle (Big)	Beltrami	Bemidji	1,436	718	45	8	
Turtle (Little)	Beltrami	Puposky	464	302	25	7	
Turtle	Douglas	Forada	220	183	21	2	
Turtle	Itasca	Marcell	2,052	556	137	10.5	
Turtle	Meeker	Darwin	47	47		4.6	
Turtle	Polk	Fosston	545	545	12	2.3	
Turtle	Ramsey	Shoreview	409	245	28	4.5	
Turtle River	Beltrami	Turtle River	1,740	688	63	10	
Tuscarora	Cook	BWCA	833	198	130	9.5	
Twelve	Morrison	Vineland	145	145		6.4	
Twin	Hennepin	Robbinsdale	212	172	44	4.6	
Twin	Otter Tail	Amor	333	189	50	16	
Twin	Sherburne	Crown					
Twin	Sherburne	Elk River	40	40	18	9.6	
Twin	Todd	Grey Eagle	314	299	43	1.5	
Twin	Wright	Silver Creek	62	62		5.4	
Twin	Wright	South Haven	872	244	97		
Twin Pond	Stearns	Sauk Centre	11	11	17	10	
Two Island	Cook	Grand Marais	731	702	27	9	
Two Rivers	Stearns	Holdingford	575	201	63	5.2	
Typo	Isanti	Stacy	295	295	6	1.5	
Unger Marsh Pond	Chippewa	Wegdahl	122	122	8	3.0	
Uhl	Wright	Hanover	85	85		2.0	
Uhlenkolts	Stearns	New Munich	258		18	9.5	
Union	Polk	Erskine	734	265	83	10.2	
Union	Rice	Little Chicago	403	403	10	3.6	
Union	Wright	South Haven	92	27	35	5	
Bottle (Upper)	Hubbard	Dorset	465	176	55	9	
Unnamed	Stearns	Avon	17	17		7.3	73030600
Unnamed Oxbow	Aitkin	Aitkin	21	21	13	11.8	
Unnamed Oxbow	Aitkin	Aitkin	40	40	12	2.6	
Unnamed Oxbow	Aitkin	Hassman	18	18	4		
Unnamed Pit	St. Louis	Ridge	22	22	72	30	
Upper Cormorant	Becker	Lake Park	856	471	29	3.9	
Upper Dean	Crow Wing	Emily	285	214	24	6.5	
Upper Gull	Cass	Nisswa	371	154	54	9.5	
Upper Lasalle	Clearwater	Lake Itasca	221	40	48	8	
Upper Pine	Pine	Finlayson	210	210	15	3.2	
Upper Panasa	Itasca	Calumet	147	147	13	3.8	
Upper Rattling Springs	Goodhue	Etter	27	27	7	6	
Upper Rice	Clearwater	Shevlin	1,689	1,689	13		
Upper Twin Pond	St. Louis	Duluth	1	7	9	5	
US Lock & Dam Pool 1	Hennepin	Minneapolis	464	464	9	2	
US Lock & Dam Pool 2	Dakota	Hastings	4,665	4,665	28	1	
US Lock & Dam Pool 5	Goodhue	Kellogg	3,574	3,574	17	6	
US Lock & Dam Pool 5A	Winona	Goodview	1,263	1,263	12	6	
US Lock & Dam Pool 6	Winona	Goodview	397	397	16	6	
US Lock & Dam Pool 9	Houston	Reno	33	33	14	6	
Vadnais (east)	Ramsey	Vadnais Heights	394	138	58	8	
Vadnais (west)	Ramsey	Vadnais Heights	216	216	9	2	
Vanduse	Aitkin	Palisade	230	189	27		
Varner	Wright	Buffalo	100	100		1.6	
Vermilion	St. Louis	Tower	40,557	15,006	76		
Vera	Lake	Ely	245	86	55	14	
Vermillion	Cass	Remer	397	230	27	8	
Vermont	Douglas	Miltona	309	207	59	18	
Vicki	Benton	Rice					
Victoria	Douglas	Alexandria	419	122	60	12.3	
Villard	Pope	Villard	536	488	16	2.8	
Vinegar	Morrison	Platte	9	9	7	4	
Virginia	Carver	Victoria	110	30	34	10.5	
Volney	Le Sueur	Le Center	283	130	67	15	
Vos	Stearns	Saint Anthony	76	76	10	6	
Wabana	Itasca	Grand Rapids	2,215	785	115	16	
Wabedo	Cass	Longville	1,185	295	95	13.5	
Waboose	Becker	Ponsford	232	231	14	11	
Waconia	Carver	Waconia	2,996	1,660	37	4	
Wacouta Pond	Goodhue	Wacouta Beach	27	27	12	6	
Wadena City Pond	Wadena	Wadena	12	12	12	6	
Wagner	Wright	Hanover	139	139		5.2	
Wagonga	Kandiyohi	Willmar	1,664	1,664	15	1.9	
Wakefield	Ramsey	Maplewood	22	22	9	4.9	
Walker	Otter Tail	Ottertail	540	342	29	4.7	
Wall	Otter Tail	Fergus Falls	683	229	34	5.5	
Warner	Stearns	Clearwater	37	12	38	8.5	
Warren Pond	Cottonwood	Windom	3	3	12	7	
Wanda Miller	Hennepin	Bloomington	17	17	6	5	
Washburn	Cass	Outing	1,554	748	111	12.5	
Washington	Le Sueur	Madison Lake	1,487	783	51	2.2	
Washington	Meeker	Darwin	2,639	2,454	17	3.9	
Washington	Wright	Buffalo	155	157	21	2.8	
Wassermann	Carver	Victoria	153	112	41	2	
Wasson	Itasca	Taconite	415	208	67	14	
Watab	Stearns	St. Joseph	94		54		
Waukenabo	Aitkin	Palisade	644	292	38	5.5	
Waverly	Wright	Waverly	485	141	71	3	
Wax	Cass	Inguadona	91	91	5	3	
Weaver	Hennepin	Maple Grove	149	76	57	3.4	
Webb	Cass	Hackensack	754	278	84	16	
Wellner-Hageman Reservoir	Brown	Dotson	75	0	24		
Welter Bros. Pond	Wright	Saint Michael					
Wensman Marsh	Stearns	Sauk Centre	17	17	3		
West	Wright	Silver Creek	118	118		4.8	
West Battle	Otter Tail	Battle Lake	5,624	2,496	108	17.5	56023900
West Chub	Lake	Isabella	114	114	12	7.5	
West Crooked	Hubbard	Nevis	279	142	50	16	
West Gemini	Stearns	Collegeville	22	22	14	4	
West Hanson	Meeker	Acton	91	91		2.1	
West Hunter	Sherburne	Crown	61	59	6	6	
West Jefferson	Le Sueur	Cleveland	441	348	24	1.5	
West Lake Sylvia	Wright	South Haven	904	244	97	17	
West Leaf	Otter Tail	Ottertail	684	256	55	9.9	
West Lost	Otter Tail	Underwood	723	692	16	9	
West McDonald	Otter Tail	Vergas	573	183	62	13.6	
West Murray Island	Stearns	Kimball; 45°20′18″N 94°17′58″W	36	36	21	3.3	
West Nelson	Todd	Motley			7		
West Pipe	Cook	Lutsen	15	15	6	5	
West Pope	Cook	Grand Marais	71	71	14	6.2	
West Sturgeon	St. Louis	Chisholm	114	42	35	5	
West Toqua	Big Stone	Graceville	322	322	4.5	0.3	
West Two Rivers Reservoir	St. Louis	Mountain Iron	966	347	27	17	
West Twin	Lyon	Florence	232	232	10	2.8	
West Twin	Morrison	Flensburg	29	29		8.2	
West Twin	Wright	Silver Creek	28	28	12	2.9	
Westman	Morrison	Lincoln					
Whale	Cook	Grand Marais	21	21	10	7.5	
Whaletail	Hennepin	St. Bonifacius	558	552	25	1.9	
White	Wright	Albion Center	135	135		5.0	
White Bear	Morrison	Pine Center	39	39		9.2	
White Bear	Ramsey/Washington	White Bear Lake	2,416	1,314	83	10.5	
White Earth	Becker	White Earth	2,079	599	120	14.5	
White Elk	Aitkin	Swatara	854		4	4	
White Iron	St. Louis	Ely	3,429	1,603	47	4	
White Oak	Itasca	Zemple	951	951	9	1.6	
White Pine	Cook	Lutsen	342	342	10	4.1	
White Swan	Itasca	Bigfork	158	119	19	10	
Whiteface	St. Louis	Markham	5,600	4,480	35	5.1	
Whitefish	Crow Wing	Cross Lake	7,370	2,713	138	9	
Whitefish	Crow Wing	Garrison	696	428	62	13.5	
Whitefish	Itasca	Wirt	563	261	51	8	
Whitefish	Lake	Tofte	339	191	49	22	
Whitefish	Polk	Fosston	226	183	18	3.8	
Whitewater	St. Louis	Hoyt Lakes	1,210	564	73	12	
Whitney	Meeker	Crow River	66	66		3.9	
Widmark	Wright	South Haven	18	18		5.9	
Wigelia Pond	Morrison	Buckman					
Wilcox	Meeker	Crow River	159	159		2	
Wildcat	Goodhue	Etter	50	50	18	7.5	
Wild Rice	St. Louis	Duluth	2,372	2,372	11	3	
Wilhelm	Wright	Hanover	108	108	14	1.8	
Wilkins	Aitkin	Palisade	372	106	39		
Willima	Wright	Annandale	90	90		4.9	
Willow	Stearns	Kimball	186	186	4	3	
Willow Pond	Morrison	Morrill					
Willow Reservoir 4	Olmsted	Rochester	39	30	24	3	
Willow Reservoir 6A	Olmsted	Rochester	70	62	22	11	
Wilmes	Washington	Woodbury	21	21	18	8	
Wilson	Lake	Schroeder	622	229	53	17	
Wilson	Murray	Lake Wilson	170	170	8	1.8	
Wimar	Otter Tail	Frazee	275	107	58	7	
Wimmer Pond	Stearns	Collegeville	11	11	8	6	
Winchester	St. Louis	Orr	360	54	50	7.5	
Windigo	Beltrami	Bemidji	199	129	15	6	
Windy	Lake	Isabella	450	199	39	7.5	
Winnibigoshish	Cass	Deer River	58,544	18,904	70		
Winona	Winona	Winona	307	278	33	3.3	
Winsted	McLeod	Winsted	376	376	12	2.1	
Wirth	Hennepin	Golden Valley	38	23	25	3.5	
Wita	Blue Earth	Mankato	474	474	6	2	
Witness	Lake	Ely	40	36	19	10	
Wojtowicz Pond	Washington	Scandia	14	14	8	4	
Wolf	Becker	Wolf Lake	1,445	1,445	16		
Wolf	Crow Wing	Crosby	190	190	7	6	
Wolf	Meeker	Dassel	262	262	11	3	
Wolf	St. Louis	Ely	299	145	28	10.5	
Wolf	Stearns	Melrose	23	23	21	4	
Wolfe	Wright	Rassat					
Wolfe Park	Hennepin	Saint Louis Park	3	3	25	2.6	
Woman	Cass	Longville	5,496	1,953	67	9.8	
Wood	Hennepin	Richfield	42	42	15	1.3	
Wood (Marguerite)	Lyon	Russell	372	367	14	7	
Wood	Sherburne	Big Lake	34	34		5.8	
Wood	Yellow Medicine	Wood Lake	432	432	9	2.7	
Wood Park	Dakota	Burnsville	13	13	14	4.3	
Wood Pile	Washington	Duluth Junction	11	11	17	5.2	
Worm	Grant	Elbow Lake	345	345	5	2	
Wrens Slough	Wright	Saint Michael	29	29		3.6	
Wynne	St. Louis	Aurora	278	70	52	6	
Xander	Winona	Goodview	82	82	102	33	
Yaeger	Wright	Waverly	110	79	28	2.2	
Yankton	Lyon	Balaton	387	387	8		
Yates	St. Louis	Kinney	16	3	50	10	
Yawkey Mine	Crow Wing	Crosby	14	2	143	27	
Youth Fishing	Hennepin	Bloomington	5	5	15	6.9	
Zabolio	Houston	Reno	18	18	8	6	
Zanders	Brown	Stark	85	85	13	6.5	
Zebulon Pike	Morrison	Gregory	1,453	1,453	47	5.6	
Zenith	Cook	Forest Center	24	24	22	13.0	
Zephyr	Cook	Prairie Portage	122	95	40	6	
Zimmer Pond	Stearns	Collegeville	3	3	3	1	
Zimmerman	Ramsey	Roseville	15	15	28	16	
Zimmy	Itasca	Suomi	14	14	96	8	
Zoo	Cook	Grand Marais	90	80	26	6	
Zumbra	Carver	Victoria	162	89	58	7.2	
Zumwalde	Stearns	Richmond	128	105	23	2.3	

== See also ==
- List of lakes in Minneapolis
- List of lakes of the United States
- List of rivers of Minnesota

== Sources ==
- Use the search facility at "LakeFinder". Minnesota Department of Natural Resources.
