= List of Inter-County Highways in Minnesota =

- Standard route markers

Highway names
- Interstates: Interstate X (I-X)
- US Highways: U.S. Highway X (US X)
- State: Trunk Highway X (MN X or TH X)
- County State-Aid Highways: County State-Aid Highway X (CSAH X)
- County roads: County Road X (CR X)

System links
- County roads of Minnesota

Inter-County Highways in Minnesota are roads locally maintained by county highway departments in Minnesota. Though the majority of these Inter-County Highways travel concurrently with other County roads in Minnesota, some travel concurrently with other highways in the state. Unlike most county roads in Minnesota that are designated with numbers that are unique only within a county, Inter-County Highways are designated with a letter, but this system is not shown on most maps. However, as these highways provide important alternate routes to the state highway system, the Minnesota Department of Transportation have recommended a local route numbering / labeling system that clearly identifies county routes that are continuous into neighboring counties. These routes, if marked, are marked with either a white square shield or a blue pentagon shield, with a blue square shield containing the route letter directly under shield with the route number.

== Route list ==
Number	Length (mi)	Length (km)	Southern or western terminus	Northern or eastern terminus	Counties	Formed	Removed	Notes
Inter-County A	—	—	Stearns County line on CR 11 north of Sauk Centre	Hubbard County line, northeast of Menahga	Todd, Wadena	—	—	
Inter-County B	—	—	MN 238 at Elmdale	Itasca County line, northeast of Bena	Crow Wing, Cass	—	—	
Inter-County C	—	—	MN 27 east of Little Falls	CR 1/Inter-County D west of Emily	Morrison, Crow Wing	—	—	
Inter-County D	—	—	Otter Tail County line west of Sebeka	Aitkin County line east of Emily	Wadena, Cass, Crow Wing	—	—	
Inter-County E	—	—	MN 29 west of Miltona	MN 27 west of Onamia	Douglas, Todd, Morrison	—	—	
Inter-County F	—	—	CR 51 at the Douglas County, Minnesota line in Osakis	Mille Lacs county line, between Lakin and Page townships	Todd, Morrison County	—	—	
Inter-County G	—	—	Mille Lacs County line northeast of Princeton	MN 65 west of Stanchfield	Isanti	—	—	
Inter-County H	—	—	Sherburne County line northeast of Zimmerman	Chisago County line west of North Branch.	Isanti	—	2016	
Inter-County J	—	—	US 169 south of Onamia	CR 24 northwest of Mora	Mille Lacs	—	—	
Former
