= Isaac Schultz =

American politician

Member of the Minnesota House of Representatives from the 10B district
- Incumbent
- Assumed office January 3, 2023
- Preceded by: Sondra Erickson

Personal details
- Born: March 11, 1991 (age 35) Upsala, Minnesota, U.S.
- Party: Republican
- Spouse: Julia
- Education: University of Northwestern – St. Paul (BA)
- Occupation: Auctioneer; Legislator
- Website: Government website Campaign website

Isaac Schultz (born March 11, 1991) is an American politician serving in the Minnesota House of Representatives since 2023. A member of the Republican Party of Minnesota, Schultz represents District 10B in central Minnesota, which includes the cities of Milaca and Foley, Watab Township, and parts of Benton, Isanti, Kanabec, Mille Lacs, and Morrison Counties.

== Early life, career and education ==
Schultz grew up on a farm near Upsala, Minnesota and attended college at the University of Northwestern – St. Paul, earning a bachelor's degree in marketing.

Schultz completed an internship in the Minnesota Senate and worked as legislative assistant to former Speaker of the Minnesota House Kurt Daudt from 2014 to 2019.

In 2014, Schultz was the campaign coordinator for Stewart Mills III's race against incumbent Rick Nolan in Minnesota's 8th Congressional District. He worked as district director for U.S. Representative Pete Stauber before his election to the state legislature.

== Minnesota House of Representatives ==
Schultz was first elected to the Minnesota House of Representatives in 2022. He first ran for an open seat created by legislative redistricting and the retirement of 10-term Republican incumbent Sondra Erickson.

Schultz serves as an assistant minority leader of the House Republican Caucus and sits on the Environment and Natural Resources Finance and Policy, Labor and Industry Finance and Policy, and Sustainable Infrastructure Committees.

=== Political positions ===
Schultz opposed the 2023 education budget bill. He criticized Vice President Kamala Harris during her visit to St. Cloud, Minnesota, to highlight electric buses, saying the Biden administration failed to keep its promise to develop the minerals required for electric vehicles from domestic sources.

Schultz criticized workers safety legislation that requires petroleum refineries to hire more highly trained contractors, saying, "state government shouldn't be in the business of firing people in this state", but ultimately he voted for the bill. He voted against legislation that would require new safety regulations for meatpacking workers and blamed unions for failing to keep workers safe.

In 2025, Schultz authored a bill prohibiting healthcare professionals from inquiring about a patient's use, possession, or access of firearms. This type of legislation is sometimes called a physician gag law. Proponents argue that it protects patient privacy and firearm rights. Patient privacy is also already protected under federal law through the Health Insurance Portability and Accountability Act (HIPAA). Many national organizations, including the American Medical Association, have opposed such legislation, citing risks to patients by limiting physicians' ability to provide the evidence-based intervention of lethal means counseling , physicians' First Amendment rights , the risk to children , and that the patient's right to privacy is protected by their right to decline to answer questions about gun ownership . Opponents also argue that prohibiting physicians from providing lethal means counseling violates a patient's right to access medical information.

In 2025, Schultz co-sponsored a bill to designate messenger RNA (mRNA) treatments, which include several COVID-19 vaccines, "weapons of mass destruction", and make possessing or administering them a crime punishable by up to 20 years in prison. The bill was drafted by a Florida-based hypnotist and conspiracy theorist who believes that mRNA treatments are "nanoparticle injections" that amount to "biological and technological weapons of mass destruction".

== Electoral history ==
2022 Minnesota State House - District 10B
Party	Candidate	Votes	%
Republican	Isaac Schultz	15,082	78.55
Democratic (DFL)	Hunter Froelich	4,089	21.30
Write-in		29	0.15
Total votes		19,200	100.0
Republican hold			

== Personal life ==
Schultz lives in Elmdale Township, Minnesota, with his wife, Julia.
