= Genola, Minnesota =

City in Minnesota, United States

- City
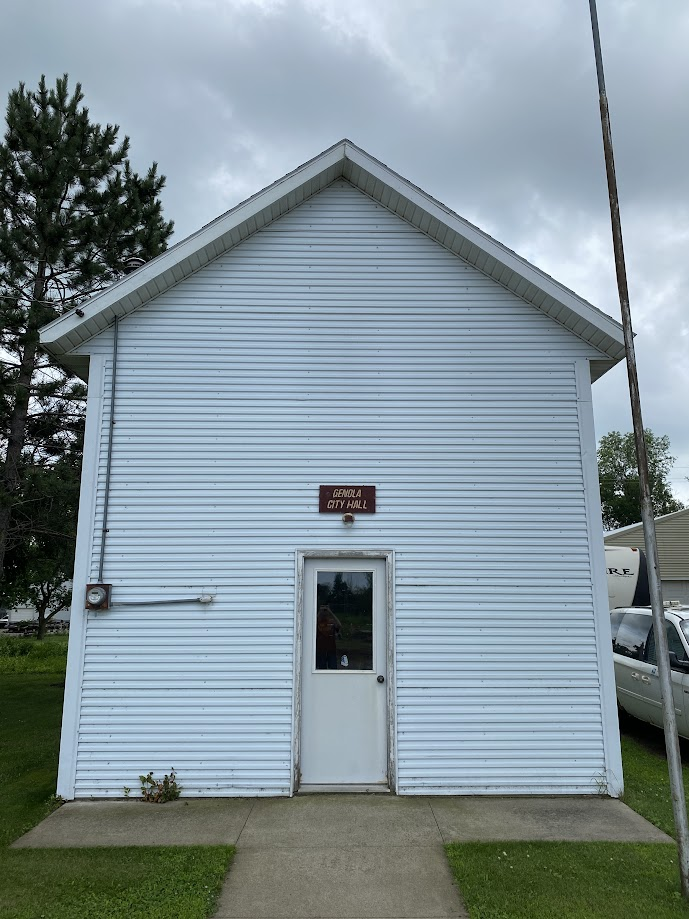
- City Hall of Genola, Minnesota

- Location in Morrison County and the state of Minnesota
- Coordinates: 45°57′56″N 94°06′56″W
- Country: United States
- State: Minnesota
- County: Morrison

Area
  - Total: 0.31 sq mi (0.80 km^{2})
  - Land: 0.31 sq mi (0.80 km^{2})
  - Water: 0 sq mi (0.00 km^{2})
- Elevation: 1,158 ft (353 m)

Population (2020)
  - Total: 70
  - Density: 228.0/sq mi (88.04/km^{2})
- Time zone: UTC-6 (Central (CST))
  - Summer (DST): UTC-5 (CDT)
- ZIP Code: 56364 (Pierz)
- Area code: 320
- FIPS code: 27-23444
- GNIS feature ID: 2394880

Genola (/dʒɛˈnoʊlə/ jen-OH-lə) is a city in Morrison County, Minnesota, United States. The population was 70 at the 2020 census.

== History ==
Genola was platted in 1908 and was a station on the Soo Line Railroad, which originally went by the name of "New Pierz". It had several other buildings, including a post office, a saloon, and a bank. In 1915, the name was changed to Genola. The present name is after Genola in Italy.

== Geography ==
Genola is in east-central Morrison County and is bordered to the north by the larger city of Pierz and to the south, east, and west by Pierz Township. Minnesota State Highway 25 passes through the center of the community, leading south 5 miles (8 km) to Buckman. State Highway 27 runs along the northern border of Genola, leading west 11 miles (18 km) to Little Falls, the county seat. Highways 25 and 27 join at the Genola/Pierz border and proceed north into Pierz. Highway 25 continues north 30 miles (48 km) to Brainerd, while Highway 27 leads east-northeast 27 miles (43 km) to Onamia.

According to the U.S. Census Bureau, Genola has a total area of 0.31 square miles (0.80 km^{2}), all land. The eastern border of the city is the Skunk River, which flows south and west to the Platte River, which continues south to the Mississippi River south of Royalton.

== Demographics ==
Historical population
Census	Pop.	Note	%±
1920	156		—
1930	68		−56.4%
1940	87		27.9%
1950	79		−9.2%
1960	108		36.7%
1970	97		−10.2%
1980	83		−14.4%
1990	85		2.4%
2000	71		−16.5%
2010	75		5.6%
2020	70		−6.7%
U.S. Decennial Census

=== 2010 census ===
As of the census of 2010, there were 75 people, 32 households, and 17 families living in the city. The population density was 220.6 inhabitants per square mile (85.2/km^{2}). There were 35 housing units at an average density of 102.9 per square mile (39.7/km^{2}). The racial makeup of the city was 100.0% White.

There were 32 households, of which 28.1% had children under the age of 18 living with them, 37.5% were married couples living together, 12.5% had a female householder with no husband present, 3.1% had a male householder with no wife present, and 46.9% were non-families. 40.6% of all households were made up of individuals, and 25% had someone living alone who was 65 years of age or older. The average household size was 2.34 and the average family size was 3.29.

The median age in the city was 39.3 years. 28% of residents were under the age of 18; 8% were between the ages of 18 and 24; 20% were from 25 to 44; 24.1% were from 45 to 64; and 20% were 65 years of age or older. The gender makeup of the city was 46.7% male and 53.3% female.

=== 2000 census ===
As of the census of 2000, there were 71 people, 27 households, and 20 families living in the city. The population density was 223.2 inhabitants per square mile (86.2/km^{2}). There were 27 housing units at an average density of 84.9 per square mile (32.8/km^{2}). The racial makeup of the city was 100.00% White.

There were 27 households, out of which 37.0% had children under the age of 18 living with them, 55.6% were married couples living together, 3.7% had a female householder with no husband present, and 25.9% were non-families. 22.2% of all households were made up of individuals, and 7.4% had someone living alone who was 65 years of age or older. The average household size was 2.63 and the average family size was 3.00.

In the city, the population was spread out, with 31.0% under the age of 18, 9.9% from 18 to 24, 28.2% from 25 to 44, 8.5% from 45 to 64, and 22.5% who were 65 years of age or older. The median age was 35 years. For every 100 females, there were 91.9 males. For every 100 females age 18 and over, there were 96.0 males.

The median income for a household in the city was $33,750, and the median income for a family was $36,250. Males had a median income of $51,250 versus $17,500 for females. The per capita income for the city was $15,796. There were no families and 2.9% of the population living below the poverty line, including no under eighteens and none of those over 64.
