= Vawter, Minnesota =

- Unincorporated community
- Location within Minnesota Location within the United States
- Coordinates: 45°54′44″N 94°14′42″W
- Country: United States
- State: Minnesota
- County: Morrison
- Townships: Bellevue and Little Falls
- Elevation: 1,106 ft (337 m)
- Time zone: UTC-6 (Central (CST))
  - Summer (DST): UTC-5 (CDT)
- ZIP code: 56373
- Area code: 320
- GNIS feature ID: 654984

Vawter is an unincorporated community in Morrison County, Minnesota, United States, near Little Falls and Royalton. The community is located along 103rd Street near Morrison County Road 35, Iris Road. Vawter is located within Bellevue Township and Little Falls Township. The Crane Meadows National Wildlife Refuge and the Rice–Skunk Lake Wildlife Management Area are both nearby.

== History ==
Vawter was platted in 1908. A post office called Vawter was in operation from 1922 until 1940.
