= Hillman, Minnesota =

City in Minnesota, United States

- City
- Location in Morrison County and the state of Minnesota
- Coordinates: 46°0′22″N 93°53′19″W
- Country: United States
- State: Minnesota
- County: Morrison
- Platted: July 1908
- Incorporated: November 7, 1938

Government
  - Mayor: Norman Iverson

Area
  - Total: 0.622 sq mi (1.610 km^{2})
  - Land: 0.622 sq mi (1.610 km^{2})
  - Water: 0 sq mi (0.000 km^{2})
- Elevation: 1,300 ft (400 m)

Population (2020)
  - Total: 23
  - Estimate (2022): 22
  - Density: 35.4/sq mi (13.66/km^{2})
- Time zone: UTC−6 (Central (CST))
  - Summer (DST): UTC−5 (CDT)
- ZIP Code: 56338
- Area code: 320
- FIPS code: 27-29150
- GNIS feature ID: 2394382
- Sales tax: 7.375%

Hillman is a city in Morrison County, Minnesota, United States. The population was 23 at the 2020 census.

== History ==
Hillman was platted in July 1908, and named after nearby Hillman Creek. A post office called Hillman was established in 1913, and remained in operation until 1994.

== Geography ==
Hillman is in eastern Morrison County and is surrounded by Leigh Township. It is 12 miles (19 km) east-northeast of Pierz, 28 miles (45 km) east of Little Falls, the county seat, and 16 miles (26 km) by road southwest of Onamia.

According to the United States Census Bureau, Hillman has a total area of 0.62 square miles (1.61 km^{2}), all land. Hillman Creek passes through the northern end of the city limits, flowing west to join the Skunk River at Pierz.

== Demographics ==
Historical population
Census	Pop.	Note	%±
1940	110		—
1950	85		−22.7%
1960	80		−5.9%
1970	49		−38.7%
1980	51		4.1%
1990	45		−11.8%
2000	29		−35.6%
2010	38		31.0%
2020	23		−39.5%
2023 (est.)	22		−4.3%
U.S. Decennial Census; 2020 Census

=== 2010 census ===
As of the 2010 census, there were 38 people, 15 households, and 12 families living in the city. The population density was 69.1 inhabitants per square mile (26.7/km^{2}). There were 18 housing units at an average density of 32.7 per square mile (12.6/km^{2}). The racial makeup of the city was 100.0% White.

There were 15 households, of which 33.3% had children under the age of 18 living with them, 60.0% were married couples living together, 13.3% had a female householder with no husband present, 6.7% had a male householder with no wife present, and 20.0% were non-families. 20.0% of all households were made up of individuals, and 6.7% had someone living alone who was 65 years of age or older. The average household size was 2.53 and the average family size was 2.83.

The median age in the city was 37 years. 28.9% of residents were under the age of 18; 2.7% were between the ages of 18 and 24; 23.7% were from 25 to 44; 31.6% were from 45 to 64; and 13.2% were 65 years of age or older. The gender makeup of the city was 42.1% male and 57.9% female.

=== 2000 census ===
As of the 2000 census, there were 29 people, 14 households, and 11 families living in the city. The population density was 53.8 inhabitants per square mile (20.8/km^{2}). There were 20 housing units at an average density of 37.1 per square mile (14.3/km^{2}). The racial makeup of the city was 100.00% White.

There were 14 households, out of which 14.3% had children under the age of 18 living with them, 71.4% were married couples living together, 7.1% had a female householder with no husband present, and 21.4% were non-families. 21.4% of all households were made up of individuals; none had someone living alone who was 65 years of age or older. The average household size was 2.07 and the average family size was 2.36.

In the city, the population was spread out, with 13.8% under the age of 18, 6.9% from 18 to 24, 13.8% from 25 to 44, 48.3% from 45 to 64, and 17.2% who were 65 years of age or older. The median age was 58 years. For every 100 females, there were 93.3 males. For every 100 females age 18 and over, there were 92.3 males.

The median income for a household in the city was $26,250, and the median income for a family was $26,250. Males had a median income of $0 versus $15,417 for females. The per capita income for the city was $11,126. There were no families and 7.4% of the population living below the poverty line, including no under eighteens and none of those over 64.

== Education ==
Its school system is Onamia Public Schools.
