= Platte, Minnesota =

- Unincorporated community
- Location within Minnesota Location within the United States
- Coordinates: 46°06′20″N 94°04′56″W
- Country: United States
- State: Minnesota
- County: Morrison
- Township: Platte
- Elevation: 1,211 ft (369 m)
- Time zone: UTC-6 (Central (CST))
  - Summer (DST): UTC-5 (CDT)
- ZIP code: 56364
- Area code: 320
- GNIS feature ID: 649542

Platte is an unincorporated community in Platte Township, Morrison County, Minnesota, United States, near Pierz. The community is located along 275th Avenue near its junction with Morrison County Road 48, 233rd Street. State Highway 25 (MN 25) is also in the immediate area. Wolf Creek and the Platte River meet at Platte.
