= Parker Township, Minnesota =

Parker Township is the name of some places in the U.S. state of Minnesota:

- Parker Township, Marshall County, Minnesota
- Parker Township, Morrison County, Minnesota
