= Elmdale, Minnesota =

City in Minnesota, United States

- City
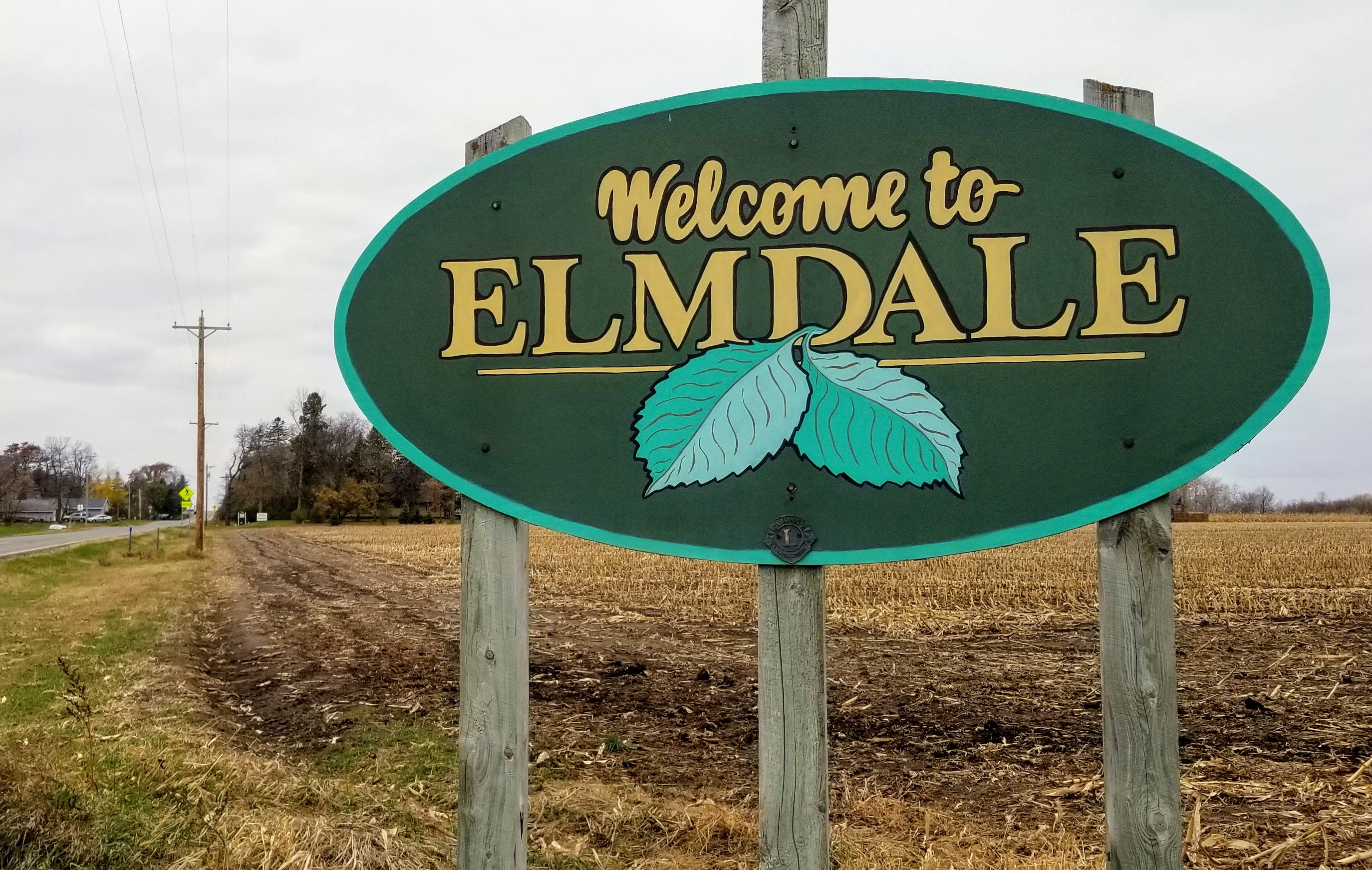
- Sign welcoming visitors to Elmdale

- Location in Morrison County and the state of Minnesota
- Coordinates: 45°49′57″N 94°30′24″W
- Country: United States
- State: Minnesota
- County: Morrison

Area
  - Total: 3.44 sq mi (8.91 km^{2})
  - Land: 3.44 sq mi (8.91 km^{2})
  - Water: 0 sq mi (0.00 km^{2})
- Elevation: 1,152 ft (351 m)

Population (2020)
  - Total: 114
  - Density: 33/sq mi (12.8/km^{2})
- Time zone: UTC-6 (Central (CST))
  - Summer (DST): UTC-5 (CDT)
- ZIP Code: 56314
- FIPS code: 27-18872
- GNIS feature ID: 2394670

Elmdale is a city in Morrison County, Minnesota, United States. The population was 114 at the 2020 census.

== Geography ==
Elmdale is in southwestern Morrison County. It is bordered to the south, east, and west by Elmdale Township and to the north by Swan River Township. Minnesota State Highway 238 and Morrison County Road 1 are two of the main routes in the community. Highway 238 leads west-southwest 5 miles (8 km) to Upsala and northeast 16 miles (26 km) to Little Falls, the Morrison county seat.

According to the U.S. Census Bureau, Elmdale has a total area of 3.44 square miles (8.91 km^{2}), all of it recorded as land. The North Two River, a tributary of the Two River, passes through the south side of the city, and Elmdale Creek, a tributary of the Little Two River, passes through the north side. Drainage via the two streams flows east to enter the Mississippi River 6 miles (10 km) away.

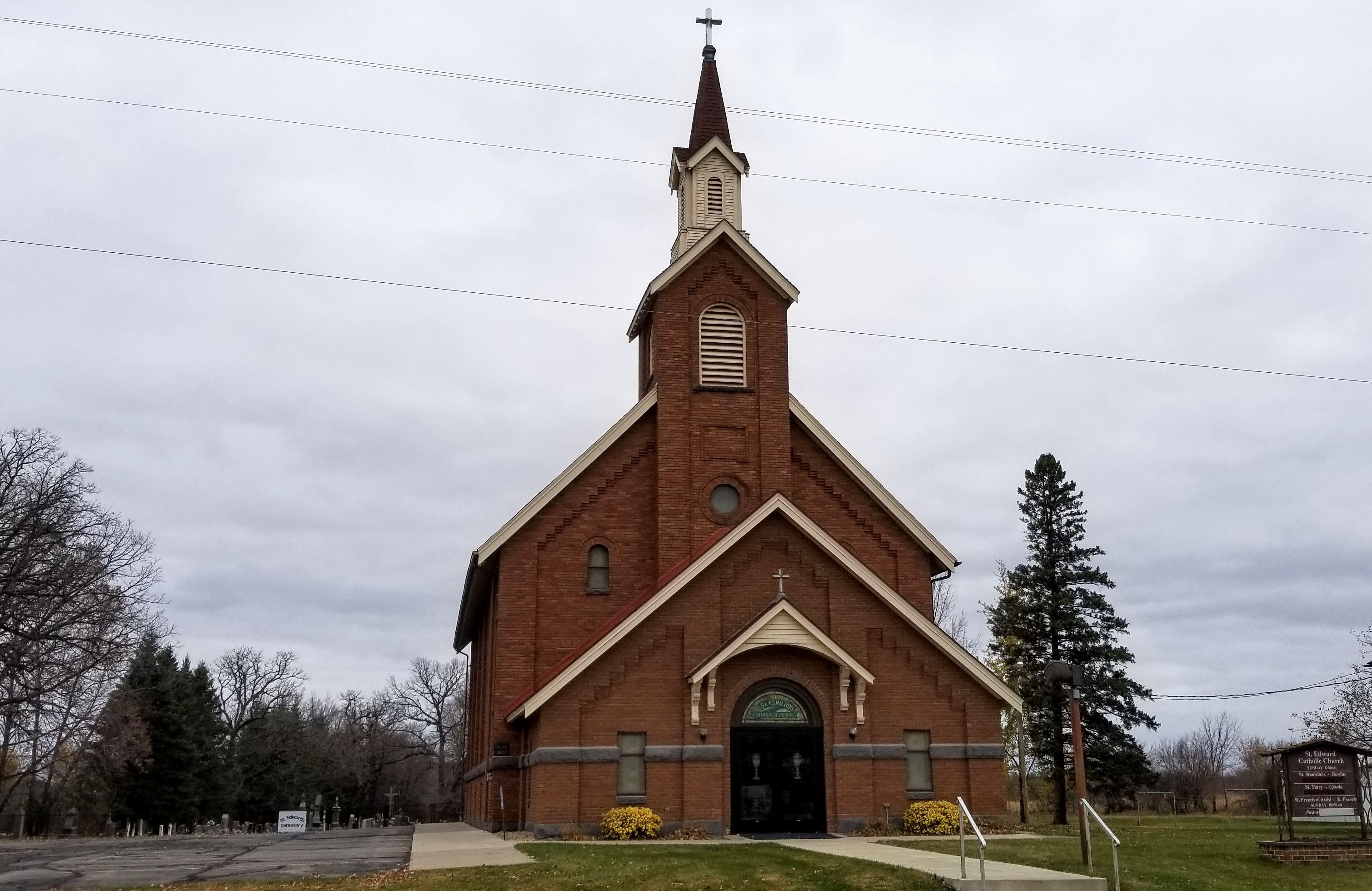
St. Edward Catholic Church

== Demographics ==
Historical population
Census	Pop.	Note	%±
1950	119		—
1960	88		−26.1%
1970	116		31.8%
1980	126		8.6%
1990	130		3.2%
2000	107		−17.7%
2010	116		8.4%
2020	114		−1.7%
U.S. Decennial Census

=== 2010 census ===
As of the census of 2010, there were 116 people, 44 households, and 28 families living in the city. The population density was 33.9 inhabitants per square mile (13.1/km^{2}). There were 47 housing units at an average density of 13.7 per square mile (5.3/km^{2}). The racial makeup of the city was 100.0% White. Hispanic or Latino of any race were 0.9% of the population.

There were 44 households, of which 29.5% had children under the age of 18 living with them, 56.8% were married couples living together, 6.8% had a male householder with no wife present, and 36.4% were non-families. 27.3% of all households were made up of individuals, and 6.8% had someone living alone who was 65 years of age or older. The average household size was 2.64 and the average family size was 3.32.

The median age in the city was 42.5 years. 25.9% of residents were under the age of 18; 5.2% were between the ages of 18 and 24; 25.9% were from 25 to 44; 25.9% were from 45 to 64; and 17.2% were 65 years of age or older. The gender makeup of the city was 51.7% male and 48.3% female.

=== 2000 census ===
As of the census of 2000, there were 107 people, 43 households, and 28 families living in the city. The population density was 31.3 inhabitants per square mile (12.1/km^{2}). There were 46 housing units at an average density of 13.5 per square mile (5.2/km^{2}). The racial makeup of the city was 100.00% White.

There were 43 households, out of which 20.9% had children under the age of 18 living with them, 48.8% were married couples living together, 14.0% had a female householder with no husband present, and 32.6% were non-families. 23.3% of all households were made up of individuals, and 11.6% had someone living alone who was 65 years of age or older. The average household size was 2.49 and the average family size was 2.93.

In the city, the population was spread out, with 21.5% under the age of 18, 6.5% from 18 to 24, 30.8% from 25 to 44, 27.1% from 45 to 64, and 14.0% who were 65 years of age or older. The median age was 38 years. For every 100 females, there were 98.1 males. For every 100 females age 18 and over, there were 82.6 males.

The median income for a household in the city was $38,125, and the median income for a family was $38,750. Males had a median income of $23,333 versus $28,125 for females. The per capita income for the city was $12,504. There were 16.7% of families and 11.9% of the population living below the poverty line, including no under eighteens and 35.3% of those over 64.
