= Lastrup, Minnesota =

City in Minnesota, United States

- City
- Location in Morrison County and the state of Minnesota
- Coordinates: 46°02′23″N 94°03′44″W
- Country: United States
- State: Minnesota
- County: Morrison

Area
  - Total: 0.38 sq mi (0.99 km^{2})
  - Land: 0.37 sq mi (0.95 km^{2})
  - Water: 0.012 sq mi (0.03 km^{2})
- Elevation: 1,237 ft (377 m)

Population (2020)
  - Total: 120
  - Density: 325.5/sq mi (125.69/km^{2})
- Time zone: UTC-6 (Central (CST))
  - Summer (DST): UTC-5 (CDT)
- ZIP code: 56344 (P.O. box); 56364 (Pierz)
- Area code: 320
- FIPS code: 27-35720
- GNIS feature ID: 2395637
- Website: cityoflastrup.com

Lastrup (/ˈleɪstrəp/ LAY-schrəp) is a city in Morrison County, Minnesota, United States. The population was 120 at the 2020 census.

== History ==
Lastrup was founded by immigrants from Schnelten, a small peasantry near Lastrup in Lower Saxony, Germany.

== Geography ==
Lastrup is in eastern Morrison County. Minnesota State Highway 27 serves as the main route in the community, leading southwest 6 miles (10 km) to Pierz and 20 miles (32 km) to Little Falls, the county seat, and east 20 miles (32 km) to Onamia.

According to the U.S. Census Bureau, Lastrup has a total area of 0.38 square miles (0.98 km^{2}), of which 0.01 square miles (0.03 km^{2}), or 3.15%, are water. Lastrup Lake and Ortman Lake are small water bodies within the city limits, and Little Mink Creek crosses the southeast corner of the city, flowing southwest to the Platte River, a tributary of the Mississippi.

== Demographics ==
Historical population
Census	Pop.	Note	%±
1920	121		—
1930	118		−2.5%
1940	128		8.5%
1950	158		23.4%
1960	138		−12.7%
1970	161		16.7%
1980	150		−6.8%
1990	112		−25.3%
2000	99		−11.6%
2010	104		5.1%
2020	120		15.4%
U.S. Decennial Census

=== 2010 census ===
As of the census of 2010, there were 104 people, 49 households, and 30 families living in the city. The population density was 236.4 inhabitants per square mile (91.3/km^{2}). There were 53 housing units at an average density of 120.5 per square mile (46.5/km^{2}). The racial makeup of the city was 100.0% White.

There were 49 households, of which 24.5% had children under the age of 18 living with them, 53.1% were married couples living together, 6.1% had a female householder with no husband present, 2.0% had a male householder with no wife present, and 38.8% were non-families. 32.7% of all households were made up of individuals, and 8.2% had someone living alone who was 65 years of age or older. The average household size was 2.12 and the average family size was 2.70.

The median age in the city was 41.5 years. 17.3% of residents were under the age of 18; 9.6% were between the ages of 18 and 24; 28.9% were from 25 to 44; 28.9% were from 45 to 64; and 15.4% were 65 years of age or older. The gender makeup of the city was 49.0% male and 51.0% female.

=== 2000 census ===
As of the census of 2000, there were 99 people, 48 households, and 26 families living in the city. The population density was 223.2 inhabitants per square mile (86.2/km^{2}). There were 49 housing units at an average density of 110.5 per square mile (42.7/km^{2}). The racial makeup of the city was 98.99% White, and 1.01% from two or more races. Hispanic or Latino of any race were 1.01% of the population.

There were 48 households, out of which 18.8% had children under the age of 18 living with them, 45.8% were married couples living together, 4.2% had a female householder with no husband present, and 45.8% were non-families. 43.8% of all households were made up of individuals, and 25.0% had someone living alone who was 65 years of age or older. The average household size was 2.06 and the average family size was 2.88.

In the city, the population was spread out, with 17.2% under the age of 18, 9.1% from 18 to 24, 24.2% from 25 to 44, 28.3% from 45 to 64, and 21.2% who were 65 years of age or older. The median age was 44 years. For every 100 females, there were 83.3 males. For every 100 females age 18 and over, there were 86.4 males.

The median income for a household in the city was $30,000, and the median income for a family was $51,250. Males had a median income of $27,917 versus $18,438 for females. The per capita income for the city was $14,622. There were 16.1% of families and 27.7% of the population living below the poverty line, including 50.0% of under eighteens and 42.9% of those over 64.
