= Harding, Minnesota =

Town in Minnesota, United States

- City
- Location in Morrison County and the state of Minnesota
- Coordinates: 46°07′12″N 94°02′10″W
- Country: United States
- State: Minnesota
- County: Morrison

Area
  - Total: 3.10 sq mi (8.03 km^{2})
  - Land: 3.10 sq mi (8.03 km^{2})
  - Water: 0 sq mi (0.00 km^{2})
- Elevation: 1,266 ft (386 m)

Population (2020)
  - Total: 123
  - Density: 39.7/sq mi (15.31/km^{2})
- Time zone: UTC-6 (Central (CST))
  - Summer (DST): UTC-5 (CDT)
- ZIP Code: 56364
- FIPS code: 27-27098
- GNIS feature ID: 2394295

Harding is a city in Morrison County, Minnesota, United States. The population was 123 at the 2020 census.

== Geography ==
Harding is in northeastern Morrison County and is bordered to the north, east, and south by Pulaski Township and to the west by Platte Township. It is 12 miles (19 km) north-northeast of Pierz, with which it shares a ZIP Code (56364), and 25 miles (40 km) northeast of Little Falls, the Morrison county seat.

According to the U.S. Census Bureau, Harding has a total area of 3.10 square miles (8.03 km^{2}), all land. The Platte River, a south-flowing tributary of the Mississippi, passes just west of the city limits.

== Demographics ==
Historical population
Census	Pop.	Note	%±
1940	117		—
1950	124		6.0%
1960	111		−10.5%
1970	119		7.2%
1980	93		−21.8%
1990	76		−18.3%
2000	105		38.2%
2010	125		19.0%
2020	123		−1.6%
U.S. Decennial Census

=== 2010 census ===
As of the census of 2010, there were 125 people, 44 households, and 26 families living in the city. The population density was 38.3 inhabitants per square mile (14.8/km^{2}). There were 47 housing units at an average density of 14.4 per square mile (5.6/km^{2}). The racial makeup of the city was 100.0% White.

There were 44 households, of which 29.5% had children under the age of 18 living with them, 45.5% were married couples living together, 6.8% had a female householder with no husband present, 6.8% had a male householder with no wife present, and 40.9% were non-families. 36.4% of all households were made up of individuals, and 20.4% had someone living alone who was 65 years of age or older. The average household size was 2.23 and the average family size was 3.00.

The median age in the city was 44.5 years. 23.2% of residents were under the age of 18; 2.4% were between the ages of 18 and 24; 25.6% were from 25 to 44; 33.6% were from 45 to 64; and 15.2% were 65 years of age or older. The gender makeup of the city was 60.8% male and 39.2% female.

=== 2000 census ===
As of the census of 2000, there were 105 people, 40 households, and 26 families living in the city. The population density was 32.2 inhabitants per square mile (12.4/km^{2}). There were 43 housing units at an average density of 13.2 per square mile (5.1/km^{2}). The racial makeup of the city was 100.00% White.

There were 40 households, out of which 20.0% had children under the age of 18 living with them, 50.0% were married couples living together, 5.0% had a female householder with no husband present, and 35.0% were non-families. 30.0% of all households were made up of individuals, and 22.5% had someone living alone who was 65 years of age or older. The average household size was 2.63 and the average family size was 2.54.

In the city, the population was spread out, with 11.4% under the age of 18, 5.7% from 18 to 24, 22.9% from 25 to 44, 41.0% from 45 to 64, and 19.0% who were 65 years of age or older. The median age was 50 years. For every 100 females, there were 144.2 males. For every 100 females age 18 and over, there were 173.5 males.

The median income for a household in the city was $35,000, and the median income for a family was $41,250. Males had a median income of $22,125 versus $14,375 for females. The per capita income for the city was $18,060. There were 25.0% of families and 26.5% of the population living below the poverty line, including 36.4% of under eighteens and 50.0% of those over 64.

== Culture ==
A parade is held in winter, usually early December, called the "Harding Horse'n Around" parade. The Harding Days festival is held around the Fourth of July, which attracts a few thousand people, and features a rodeo which was most recently held at JJ Legacy Cattle in 2025.

== Local Community ==
There is an auto shop and gas and diesel station called "Roscoe's Repair" located at the Morrison County highways 23 and 51 junction. There are two bar and grills near the Morrison County highways 51 and 276 junction. There is a community center that has a baseball plot in northern Harding.
