= Flensburg, Minnesota =

City in Minnesota, United States

- City
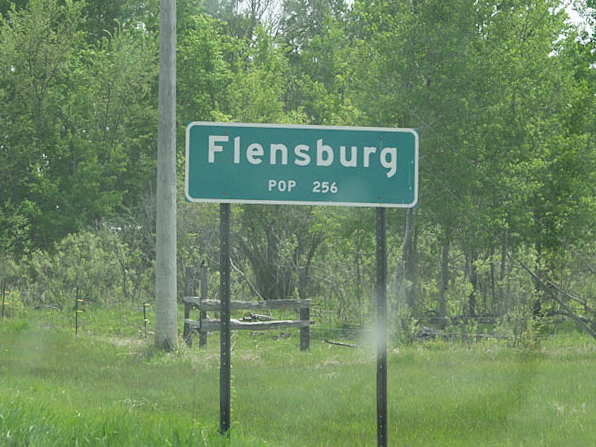
- Flensburg city sign, 2006

- Location in Morrison County and the state of Minnesota
- Coordinates: 45°56′53″N 94°31′48″W
- Country: United States
- State: Minnesota
- County: Morrison
- Platted: March 1890
- Incorporated: June 17, 1911

Government
  - Mayor: Jim Gorka

Area
  - Total: 7.022 sq mi (18.187 km^{2})
  - Land: 6.980 sq mi (18.077 km^{2})
  - Water: 0.043 sq mi (0.111 km^{2})
- Elevation: 1,230 ft (375 m)

Population (2020)
  - Total: 216
  - Estimate (2022): 214
  - Density: 31.0/sq mi (11.95/km^{2})
- Time zone: UTC−6 (Central (CST))
  - Summer (DST): UTC−5 (CDT)
- ZIP code: 56328
- Area code: 320
- FIPS code: 27-21266
- GNIS feature ID: 2394770
- Sales tax: 7.375%

Flensburg is a city in Morrison County, Minnesota, United States. The population was 216 at the 2020 census.

== History ==
After the Little Falls and Dakota Railroad was completed in 1882, there was a sidetrack to a mill at the site which later became Flensburg Village. The mill was called "Flen's Landing" or "Flynn's Siding", with a depot, and named for J. C. Flynn of Little Falls. Flynn was a teacher in the Little Falls schools in the late 1870s. Later, Flynn was an inspector for the Northern Pacific Railroad and a representative in the state legislature. He was also instrumental in developing the Little Falls & Dakota (L.F.& D.) railroad which ran through the future town of Flensburg.

Flensburg was platted in March 1890 by Olaf and Dagmar Searle. The post office began in 1892, and Flensburg was incorporated on June 17, 1911. Flensburg received its name in 1892, and the local newspapers, the Little Falls Weekly Tribune and Little Falls Herald, began using that name about that time. However, a brief item in the April 7, 1893, edition of the Little Falls Transcript states, "The name of Flynn station, on the L.F.& D., has been changed to Flensburg, to take effect on April 1, 1893". No further explanation was given.

One theory is that Flensburg may have been named after the German town of Flensburg, a seaport in the German state of Schleswig-Holstein. However, many land owner surnames were Polish in the 1892 Culdrum Township Plat Book of the Flensburg area, and it seems unlikely they would have chosen the name of a distant German seaport for their new town. Since burg simply means "castle" it would be reasonable to name the new town Flynnsburg, or the shorter version Flensburg, since the name "Flen's Landing" was also in use for Flynn Station.

== Geography ==
Flensburg is in western Morrison County. It is bordered to the south by Swanville Township, to the north and west by Culdrum Township, to the north and east by Pike Creek Township, and to the southeast by the city of Sobieski. Flensburg is 9 miles (14 km) west-southwest of Little Falls, the Morrison county seat.

According to the United States Census Bureau, Flensburg has a total area of 7.022 square miles (18.19 km^{2}), of which 6.979 square miles (18.08 km^{2}) are land and 0.043 square miles (0.11 km^{2}), or 0.61%, are water. Several small natural lakes, including Prowect Lake, Kuhl Lake, and Larson Lake, are in the southwest part of the city limits.

== Demographics ==
Historical population
Census	Pop.	Note	%±
1920	210		—
1930	284		35.2%
1940	275		−3.2%
1950	281		2.2%
1960	280		−0.4%
1970	259		−7.5%
1980	256		−1.2%
1990	213		−16.8%
2000	244		14.6%
2010	225		−7.8%
2020	216		−4.0%
2022 (est.)	214		−0.9%
U.S. Decennial Census; 2020 Census

=== 2010 census ===
As of the 2010 census, there were 225 people, 84 households, and 53 families living in the city. The population density was 32.3 inhabitants per square mile (12.5/km^{2}). There were 94 housing units at an average density of 13.5 per square mile (5.2/km^{2}). The racial makeup of the city was 97.3% White, 0.4% Native American, 0.4% Asian, and 1.8% from two or more races.

There were 84 households, of which 39.3% had children under the age of 18 living with them, 52.4% were married couples living together, 8.3% had a female householder with no husband present, 2.4% had a male householder with no wife present, and 36.9% were non-families. 33.3% of all households were made up of individuals, and 15.5% had someone living alone who was 65 years of age or older. The average household size was 2.64 and the average family size was 3.43.

The median age in the city was 37.3 years. 29.3% of residents were under the age of 18; 5.8% were between the ages of 18 and 24; 22.6% were from 25 to 44; 24.5% were from 45 to 64; and 17.8% were 65 years of age or older. The gender makeup of the city was 50.2% male and 49.8% female.

=== 2000 census ===
As of the 2000 census, there were 244 people, 89 households, and 63 families living in the city. The population density was 35.2 inhabitants per square mile (13.6/km^{2}). There were 92 housing units at an average density of 13.3 per square mile (5.1/km^{2}). The racial makeup of the city was 97.95% White, 0.82% Asian, and 1.23% from two or more races.

There were 89 households, out of which 33.7% had children under the age of 18 living with them, 56.2% were married couples living together, 10.1% had a female householder with no husband present, and 28.1% were non-families. 28.1% of all households were made up of individuals, and 15.7% had someone living alone who was 65 years of age or older. The average household size was 2.71 and the average family size was 3.33.

In the city, the population was spread out, with 31.1% under the age of 18, 8.6% from 18 to 24, 23.4% from 25 to 44, 19.7% from 45 to 64, and 17.2% who were 65 years of age or older. The median age was 35 years. For every 100 females, there were 100.0 males. For every 100 females age 18 and over, there were 100.0 males.

The median income for a household in the city was $34,107, and the median income for a family was $43,125. Males had a median income of $28,750 versus $21,750 for females. The per capita income for the city was $15,652. About 4.4% of families and 8.2% of the population were below the poverty line, including 5.2% of those under the age of eighteen and 25.6% of those 65 or over.
