= Pierz =

Pierz may refer to:

- Francis Xavier Pierz, Roman Catholic missionary to the Ottawa and Ojibwa Indians
- Pierz, Minnesota, a small city in the United States
- Pierz Township, Morrison County, Minnesota
