= Sobieski, Minnesota =

City in Minnesota, United States

- City
- Location in Morrison County and the state of Minnesota
- Coordinates: 45°55′20″N 94°29′30″W
- Country: United States
- State: Minnesota
- County: Morrison

Area
  - Total: 4.00 sq mi (10.36 km^{2})
  - Land: 4.00 sq mi (10.36 km^{2})
  - Water: 0 sq mi (0.00 km^{2})
- Elevation: 1,175 ft (358 m)

Population (2020)
  - Total: 210
  - Density: 52.5/sq mi (20.27/km^{2})
- Time zone: UTC-6 (Central (CST))
  - Summer (DST): UTC-5 (CDT)
- ZIP Code: 56345
- Area code: 320
- FIPS code: 27-61006
- GNIS feature ID: 2395905

Sobieski is a city in Morrison County, Minnesota, United States. The population was 210 at the 2020 census.

== History ==
Sobieski was named after Polish King John III Sobieski. The House of Sobieski was a noble family with a prominent role in Polish history, and the choice of name reflects the large Polish American element in the town's population.

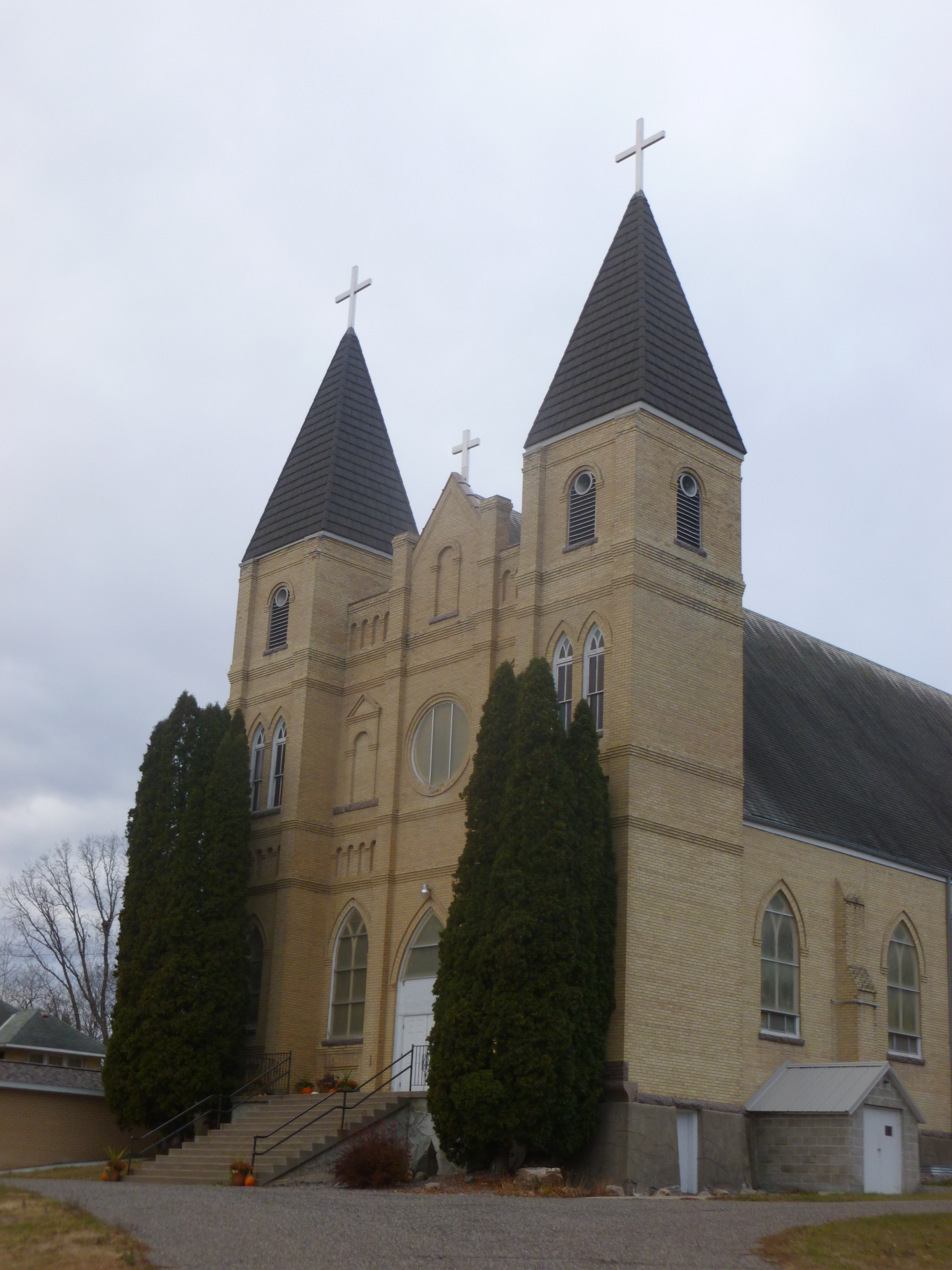
St. Stanislaus Bishop & Martyr Catholic Church

Sobieski was incorporated as a village on December 2, 1915, within Sections 3-9 of Swan River Township, and separated from the township on June 10, 1920. It was developed on the site of earlier communities. The first was a post office in Section 4, 1875–1904, called "Ledoux" for Frank X. Ledoux, who owned a store and was first postmaster. The community was next called "Swan River", not to be confused with a post office that existed from 1854 to 1879 in Benton County. In 1918 the name was changed to Sobieski. The community was also known as "Green's Ferry" and "Aitkinsville", the latter because William A. Aitkin, the fur trader for whom Aitkin County was named, is buried there.

From what can be gathered, as many of the local people are of Kashubian-Polish Heritage, the naming of the community for Jan Sobieski is fitting for his association with the Kashubian Polish Hussars in defeating the Ottomans, most notably at the Battle of Vienna in 1683.

== Geography ==
Sobieski is in western Morrison County, 7 miles (11 km) southwest of Little Falls, the county seat. Sobieski is bordered to the northwest by the city of Flensburg, to the north by Pike Creek Township, to the east, south, and west by Swan River Township, and partially to the west by Swanville Township.

According to the U.S. Census Bureau, Sobieski has a total area of 4.00 square miles (10.36 km^{2}), all of it recorded as land. The Swan River passes through the city, flowing east to the Mississippi River 3 miles (5 km) away.

== Demographics ==
Historical population
Census	Pop.	Note	%±
1920	203		—
1930	250		23.2%
1940	171		−31.6%
1950	189		10.5%
1960	190		0.5%
1970	189		−0.5%
1980	219		15.9%
1990	199		−9.1%
2000	196		−1.5%
2010	195		−0.5%
2020	210		7.7%
U.S. Decennial Census

=== 2010 census ===
As of the census of 2010, there were 195 people, 87 households, and 51 families living in the city. The population density was 46.8 inhabitants per square mile (18.1/km^{2}). There were 91 housing units at an average density of 21.8 per square mile (8.4/km^{2}). The racial makeup of the city was 100.0% White.

There were 87 households, of which 23.0% had children under the age of 18 living with them, 48.3% were married couples living together, 3.4% had a female householder with no husband present, 6.9% had a male householder with no wife present, and 41.4% were non-families. 32.2% of all households were made up of individuals, and 12.6% had someone living alone who was 65 years of age or older. The average household size was 2.24 and the average family size was 2.88.

The median age in the city was 43.5 years. 23.1% of residents were under the age of 18; 3.1% were between the ages of 18 and 24; 25.6% were from 25 to 44; 33.8% were from 45 to 64; and 14.4% were 65 years of age or older. The gender makeup of the city was 52.3% male and 47.7% female.

=== 2000 census ===
As of the census of 2000, there were 196 people, 87 households, and 54 families living in the city. The population density was 46.8 inhabitants per square mile (18.1/km^{2}). There were 88 housing units at an average density of 21.0 per square mile (8.1/km^{2}). The racial makeup of the city was 99.49% White and 0.51% Native American.

There were 87 households, out of which 23.0% had children under the age of 18 living with them, 50.6% were married couples living together, 8.0% had a female householder with no husband present, and 36.8% were non-families. 32.2% of all households were made up of individuals, and 16.1% had someone living alone who was 65 years of age or older. The average household size was 2.25 and the average family size was 2.82.

In the city, the population was spread out, with 21.4% under the age of 18, 9.7% from 18 to 24, 27.6% from 25 to 44, 22.4% from 45 to 64, and 18.9% who were 65 years of age or older. The median age was 42 years. For every 100 females, there were 104.2 males. For every 100 females age 18 and over, there were 108.1 males.

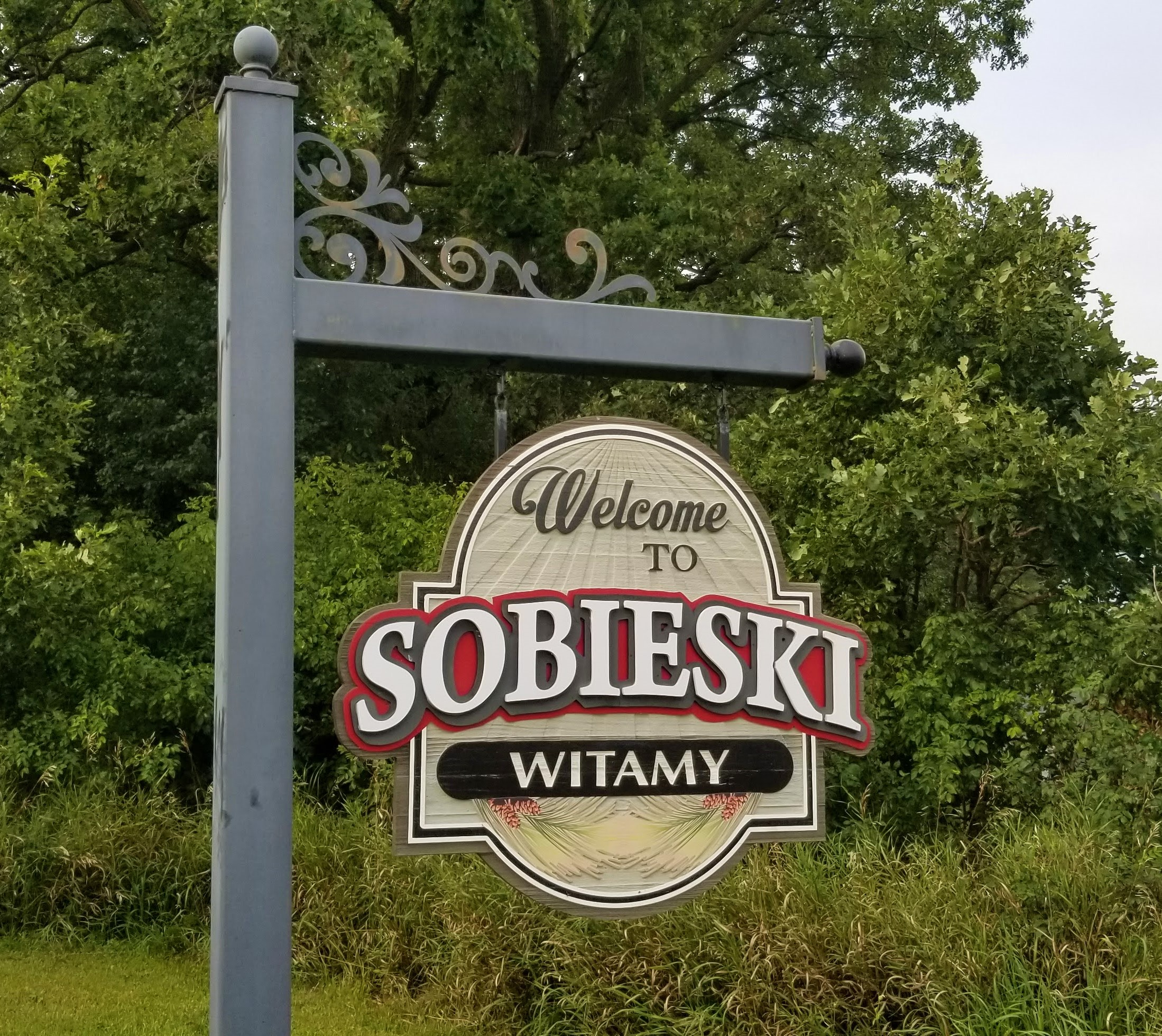
Sobieski welcome sign featuring the Polish word for welcome, "witamy"

=== Economy ===
The median income for a household in the city was $30,625, and the median income for a family was $36,250. Males had a median income of $30,313 versus $20,000 for females. The per capita income for the city was $14,344. About 10.0% of families and 19.1% of the population were below the poverty line, including 14.3% of those under the age of eighteen and 27.9% of those 65 or over.
