= Hillman Creek =

Stream in Morrison County, Minnesota, U.S.

Coordinates: 45°58′35″N 94°05′23″W

Hillman Creek is a stream in Morrison County, in the U.S. state of Minnesota.

Hillman Creek bears the name of an early settler.

== See also ==
- List of rivers of Minnesota
