= Mount Morris Township, Morrison County, Minnesota =

Mount Morris Township, Minnesota
- Township
- Location within the state of Minnesota Mount Morris Township, Minnesota (the United States)
- Coordinates: 45°57′20″N 93°50′52″W
- Country: United States
- State: Minnesota
- County: Morrison

Area
  - Total: 30.0 sq mi (77.6 km^{2})
  - Land: 30.0 sq mi (77.6 km^{2})
  - Water: 0 sq mi (0.0 km^{2})
- Elevation: 1,289 ft (393 m)

Population (2000)
  - Total: 90
  - Density: 3.1/sq mi (1.2/km^{2})
- Time zone: UTC-6 (Central (CST))
  - Summer (DST): UTC-5 (CDT)
- FIPS code: 27-44602
- GNIS feature ID: 0665056

Mount Morris Township is a township in Morrison County, Minnesota, United States. The population was 90 at the 2000 census.

Mount Morris Township was organized in 1897.

== Geography ==
According to the United States Census Bureau, the township has a total area of 30.0 square miles (77.6 km^{2}), of which 0.03% is water.

== Demographics ==
As of the census of 2000, there were 90 people, 32 households, and 24 families residing in the township. The population density was 3.0 people per square mile (1.2/km^{2}). There were 43 housing units at an average density of 1.4/sq mi (0.6/km^{2}). The racial makeup of the township was 100.00% White.

There were 32 households, out of which 37.5% had children under the age of 18 living with them, 75.0% were married couples living together, and 21.9% were non-families. 21.9% of all households were made up of individuals, and 15.6% had someone living alone who was 65 years of age or older. The average household size was 2.81 and the average family size was 3.32.

In the township the population was spread out, with 31.1% under the age of 18, 2.2% from 18 to 24, 31.1% from 25 to 44, 22.2% from 45 to 64, and 13.3% who were 65 years of age or older. The median age was 36 years. For every 100 females, there were 91.5 males. For every 100 females age 18 and over, there were 113.8 males.

The median income for a household in the township was $19,375, and the median income for a family was $30,000. Males had a median income of $23,750 versus $22,500 for females. The per capita income for the township was $9,483. There were 20.0% of families and 26.8% of the population living below the poverty line, including 23.5% of under eighteens and 77.8% of those over 64.
