= Buckman, Minnesota =

City in ohio United States

- City
- Location in Morrison County and the state of Minnesota
- Coordinates: 45°53′50″N 94°05′38″W
- Country: United States
- State: Minnesota
- County: Morrison

Area
  - Total: 1.01 sq mi (2.62 km^{2})
  - Land: 1.01 sq mi (2.62 km^{2})
  - Water: 0 sq mi (0.00 km^{2})
- Elevation: 1,221 ft (372 m)

Population (2020)
  - Total: 307
  - Density: 303.1/sq mi (117.03/km^{2})
- Time zone: UTC-6 (Central (CST))
  - Summer (DST): UTC-5 (CDT)
- ZIP code: 56317 (P.O. boxes only); 56364 (Pierz)
- Area code: 320
- FIPS code: 27-08416
- GNIS feature ID: 2393450

Buckman is a city in Morrison County, Minnesota, United States. The population was 307 at the 2020 Census.

== History ==
A post office called Buckman was established in 1877. The city was named for Clarence B. Buckman, an early settler and member of the U.S. House of Representatives.

== Geography ==
Buckman is in southeastern Morrison County, surrounded by the northern part of Buckman Township. Minnesota State Highway 25 and Morrison County Road 34 are two of the main routes in the community. Highway 25 leads north 7 miles (11 km) to Pierz and southeast 23 miles (37 km) to Foley. County Road 34 (93rd Street) leads west 11 miles (18 km) to U.S. Route 10, which in turn leads 6 miles (10 km) north to Little Falls, the Morrison county seat.

According to the U.S. Census Bureau, the city of Buckman has a total area of 1.01 square miles (2.62 km^{2}), all of it recorded as land. Buckman Creek, a west-flowing tributary of the Platte River, crosses the northern part of the city.

== Demographics ==
Historical population
Census	Pop.	Note	%±
1910	137		—
1920	227		65.7%
1930	212		−6.6%
1940	186		−12.3%
1950	173		−7.0%
1960	166		−4.0%
1970	158		−4.8%
1980	171		8.2%
1990	201		17.5%
2000	208		3.5%
2010	270		29.8%
2020	307		13.7%
U.S. Decennial Census

=== 2010 census ===
As of the census of 2010, there were 270 people, 95 households, and 72 families living in the city. The population density was 264.7 inhabitants per square mile (102.2/km^{2}). There were 105 housing units at an average density of 102.9 per square mile (39.7/km^{2}). The racial makeup of the city was 98.9% White and 1.1% African American. Hispanic or Latino of any race were 2.6% of the population.

There were 95 households, of which 43.2% had children under the age of 18 living with them, 58.9% were married couples living together, 8.4% had a female householder with no husband present, 8.4% had a male householder with no wife present, and 24.2% were non-families. 18.9% of all households were made up of individuals, and 9.5% had someone living alone who was 65 years of age or older. The average household size was 2.84 and the average family size was 3.25.

The median age in the city was 30.3 years. 31.9% of residents were under the age of 18; 7.6% were between the ages of 18 and 24; 36.7% were from 25 to 44; 14.4% were from 45 to 64; and 9.3% were 65 years of age or older. The gender makeup of the city was 50.7% male and 49.3% female.

=== 2000 census ===
As of the census of 2000, there were 208 people, 73 households, and 57 families living in the city. The population density was 202.5 inhabitants per square mile (78.2/km^{2}). There were 75 housing units at an average density of 73.0 per square mile (28.2/km^{2}). The racial makeup of the city was 100.00% White.

There were 73 households, out of which 45.2% had children under the age of 18 living with them, 60.3% were married couples living together, 9.6% had a female householder with no husband present, and 21.9% were non-families. 20.5% of all households were made up of individuals, and 12.3% had someone living alone who was 65 years of age or older. The average household size was 2.85 and the average family size was 3.26.

In the city, the population was spread out, with 30.3% under the age of 18, 13.0% from 18 to 24, 30.8% from 25 to 44, 11.1% from 45 to 64, and 14.9% who were 65 years of age or older. The median age was 28 years. For every 100 females, there were 100.0 males. For every 100 females age 18 and over, there were 116.4 males.

The median income for a household in the city was $32,500, and the median income for a family was $44,583. Males had a median income of $27,500 versus $22,857 for females. The per capita income for the city was $13,700. About 3.9% of families and 6.9% of the population were below the poverty line, including 9.1% of those under the age of eighteen and 17.1% of those 65 or over.
