= Freedhem, Minnesota =

- Unincorporated community
- Location within Minnesota Location within the United States
- Coordinates: 46°03′23″N 94°12′31″W
- Country: United States
- State: Minnesota
- County: Morrison
- Township: Belle Prairie
- Elevation: 1,260 ft (380 m)
- Time zone: UTC-6 (Central (CST))
  - Summer (DST): UTC-5 (CDT)
- ZIP code: 56345
- Area code: 320
- GNIS feature ID: 643920

Freedhem is an unincorporated community in Belle Prairie Township, Morrison County, Minnesota, United States. The community is located near the junction of 203rd Street and Morrison County Road 45, Jewel Road. Nearby places include Little Falls, Pierz, and Camp Ripley.

Freedhem was a Swedish settlement in the early 1900s that was an agricultural gem of Morrison county, Minnesota. It had a large farmers' co-operative creamery, general store and two Swedish churches.

The Swedish Free Evangelical was organized at Sam Bloom's home. At this meeting a name was selected for the little settlement. Freedhem, which in Swedish means "Peaceful Home". In May 1901 the church was incorporated. The Sam Bloom family donated two acres in the northwest corner of their land to build a church and create a burial place for the settlers.

As more people moved to the little settlement, a need was created for a Lutheran church in addition to the Evangelical church already in existence. A meeting was held at A.J. Bergquist home to organize and later the decision was made to erect the building in Freedhem and call it Swedish Lutheran Zion.

== Sources ==
- "History of Freedhem" by Mrs. Edwin O. Swanson (1968)
- "History of Morrison & Todd Counties, Minnesota" by Clara Fuller (1915)
