= Upsala, Minnesota =

City in Minnesota, United States

- City
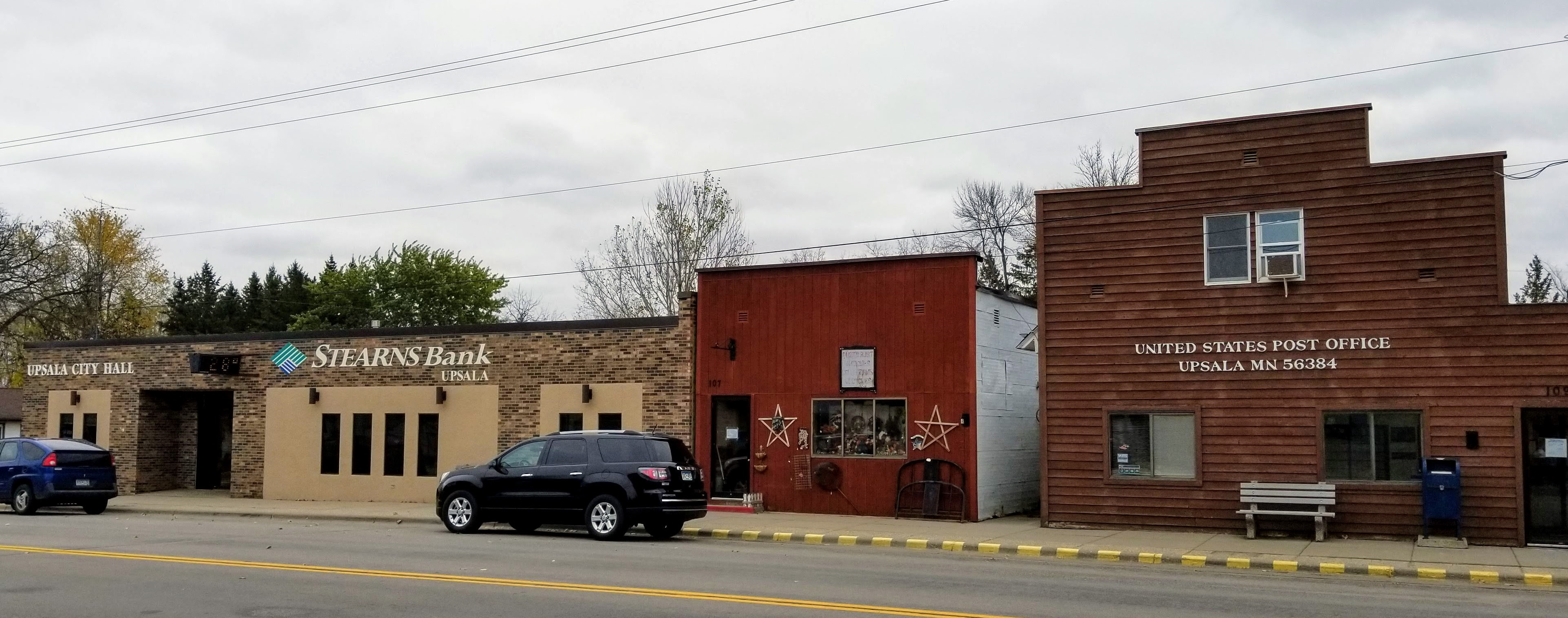
- Upsala city hall and post office
- Motto: "Where life is always looking up!"
- Location in Morrison County and the state of Minnesota
- Coordinates: 45°48′36″N 94°34′02″W
- Country: United States
- State: Minnesota
- County: Morrison

Government
  - Mayor: Rollie Johnson
  - City Council: Members: Lana Bartells; Mitch Lange; Wendy Rene; Alan Gunderson

Area
  - Total: 3.24 sq mi (8.39 km^{2})
  - Land: 3.24 sq mi (8.39 km^{2})
  - Water: 0 sq mi (0.00 km^{2})
- Elevation: 1,198 ft (365 m)

Population (2020)
  - Total: 487
  - Density: 150.4/sq mi (58.06/km^{2})
- Time zone: UTC-6 (Central (CST))
  - Summer (DST): UTC-5 (CDT)
- ZIP code: 56384
- Area code: 320
- FIPS code: 27-66334
- GNIS feature ID: 2397095
- Website: cityofupsala.com

Upsala is a city in Morrison County, Minnesota, United States. The population was 487 at the 2020 census, up from 427 in 2010.

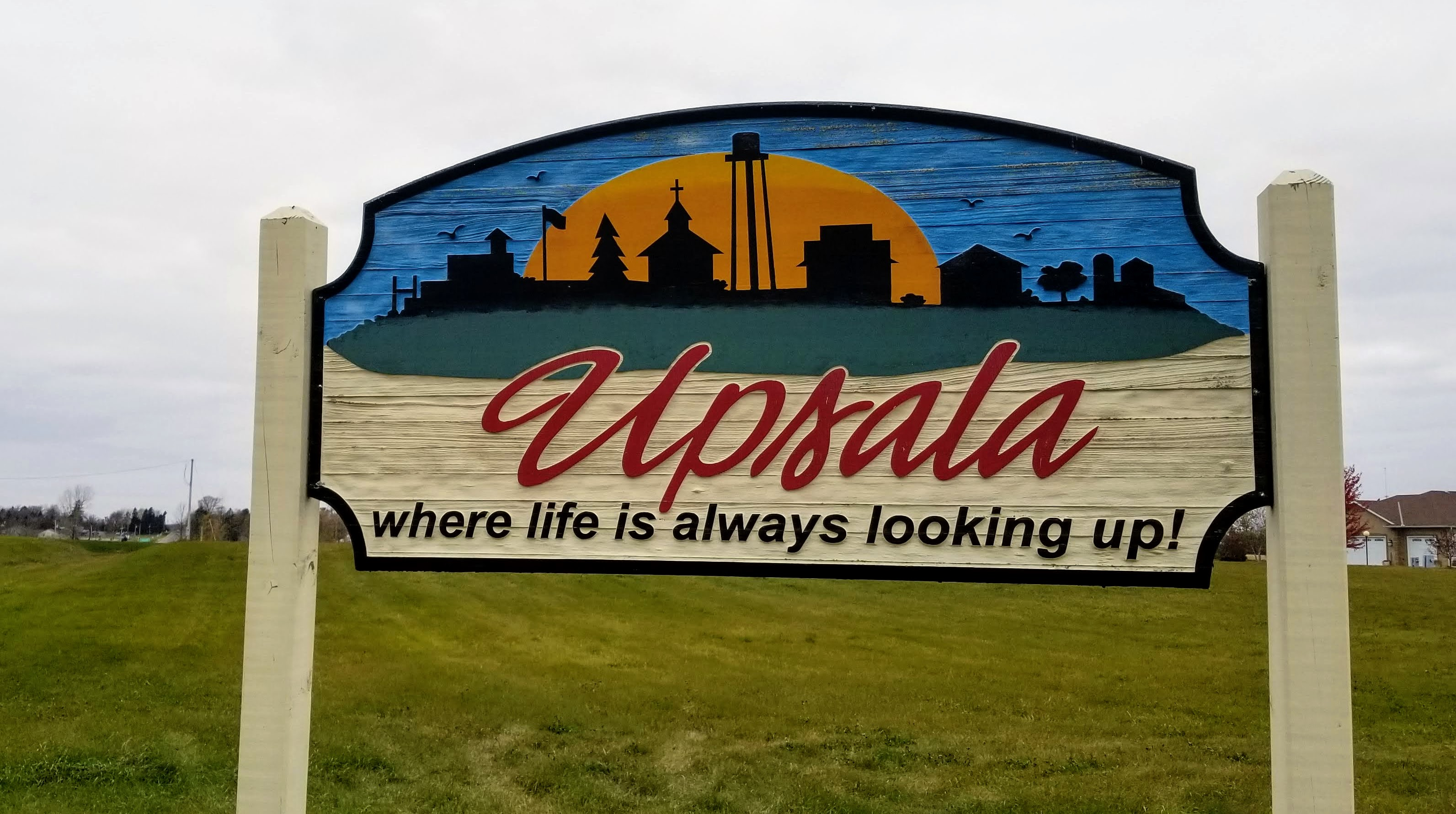
Sign welcoming visitors to Upsala

== History ==
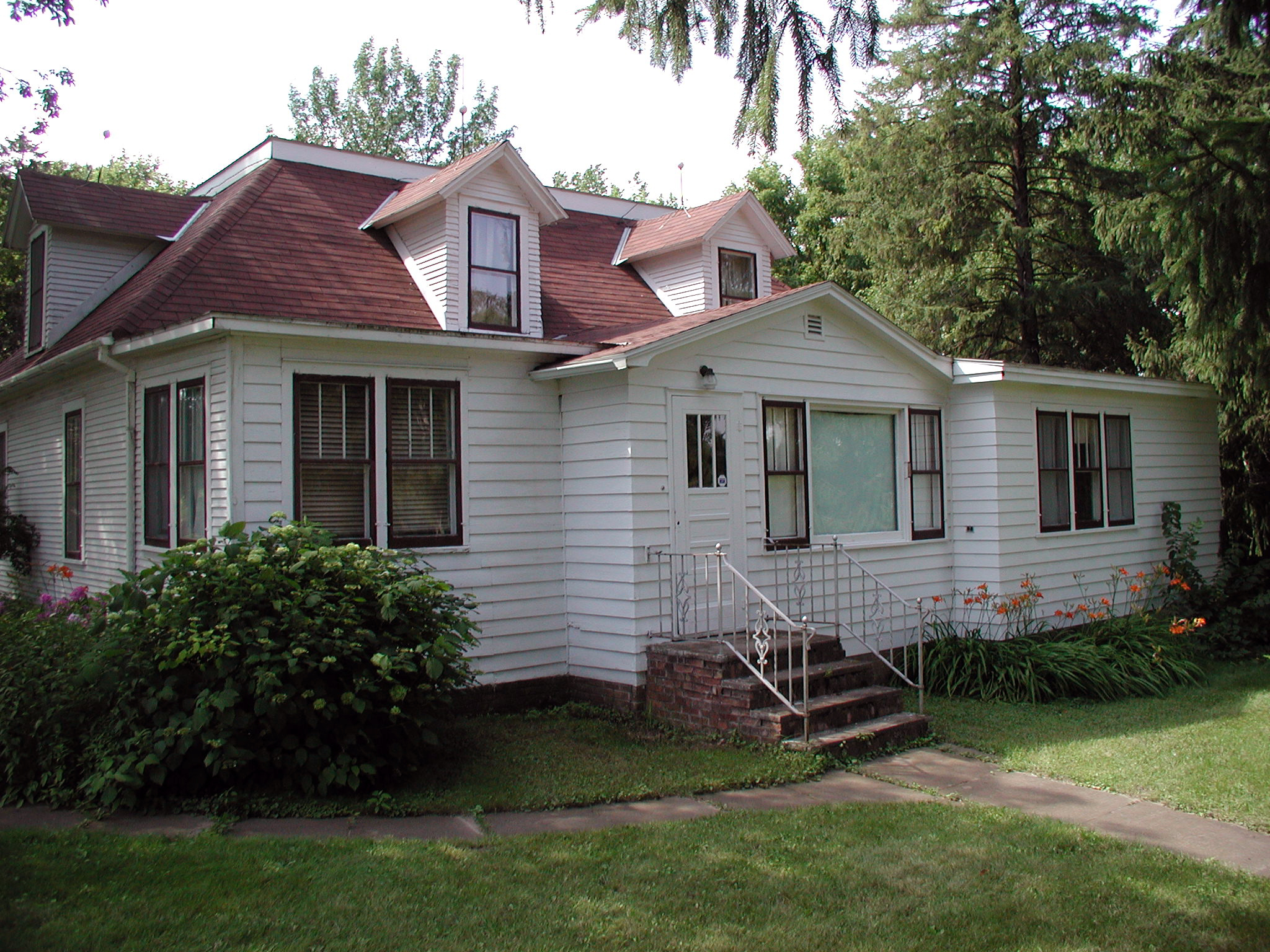
Borgstrom House museum, Upsala Area Historical Society

A post office called Upsala was established in 1883. Swedish settlers named the city after Uppsala, Sweden.

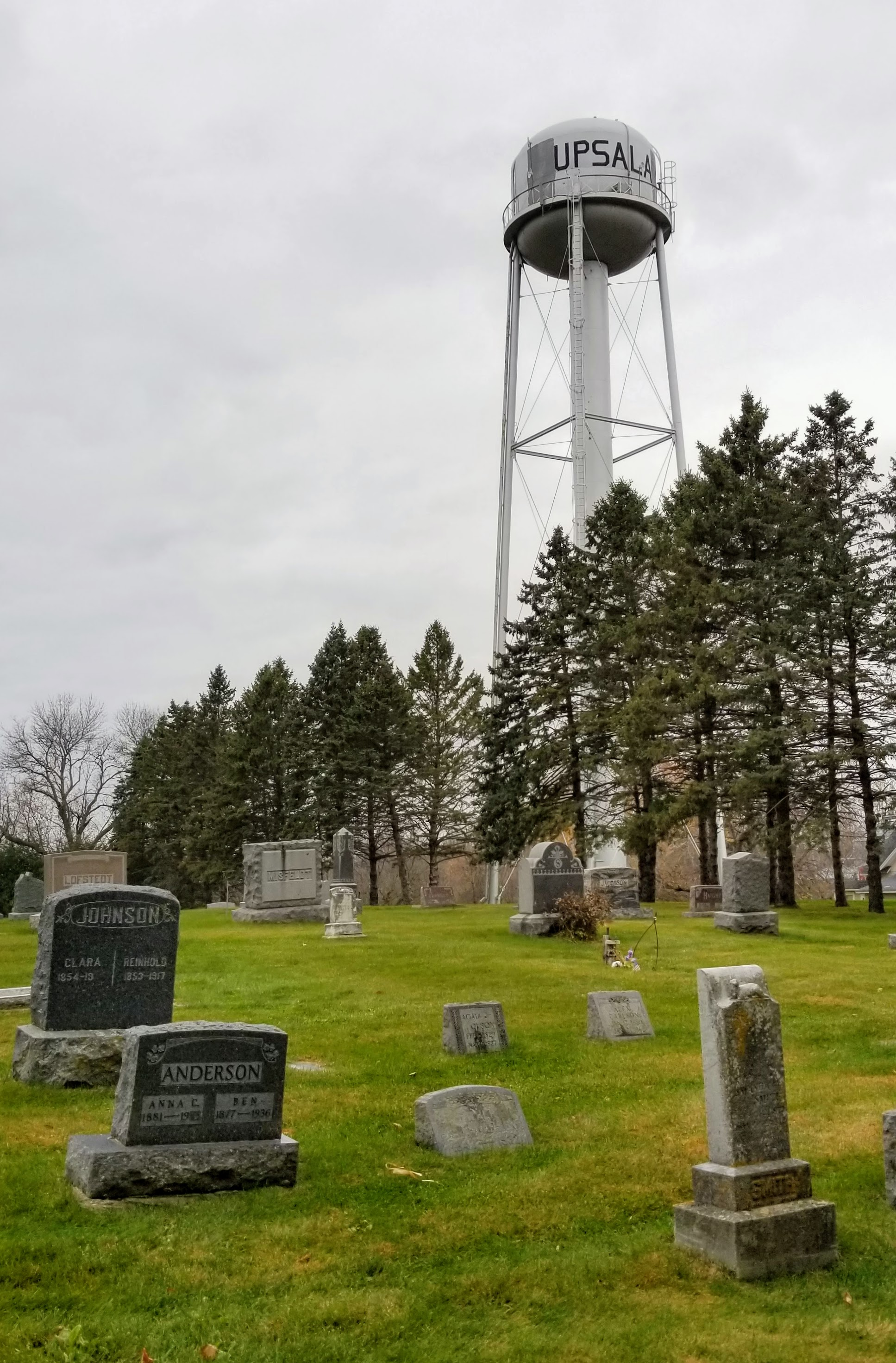
Covenant Church Cemetery

== Geography ==
Upsala is in southwestern Morrison County, surrounded by Elmdale Township. Minnesota State Highway 238 (Main Street) passes through the center of the community, leading east 5 miles (8 km) to Elmdale and northeast 21 miles (34 km) to Little Falls, the county seat. To the south, Highway 238 leads 15 miles (24 km) to Albany.

According to the U.S. Census Bureau, Upsala has an area of 3.24 square miles (8.39 km^{2}), of which 0.001 square miles (0.003 km^{2}), or 0.03%, are water. The North Two River passes through the center of Upsala, flowing east to the Mississippi River near Royalton.

== Demographics ==
Historical population
Census	Pop.	Note	%±
1920	316		—
1930	345		9.2%
1940	347		0.6%
1950	366		5.5%
1960	356		−2.7%
1970	312		−12.4%
1980	400		28.2%
1990	371		−7.2%
2000	424		14.3%
2010	427		0.7%
2020	487		14.1%
U.S. Decennial Census

=== 2010 census ===
As of the census of 2010, there were 427 people, 188 households, and 115 families living in the city. The population density was 131.8 inhabitants per square mile (50.9/km^{2}). There were 211 housing units at an average density of 65.1 per square mile (25.1/km^{2}). The racial makeup of the city was 95.6% White, 0.9% African American, 0.7% Native American, 0.5% Asian, 0.2% Pacific Islander, 1.4% from other races, and 0.7% from two or more races. Hispanic or Latino of any race were 4.0% of the population.

There were 188 households, of which 31.4% had children under the age of 18 living with them, 46.8% were married couples living together, 10.1% had a female householder with no husband present, 4.3% had a male householder with no wife present, and 38.8% were non-families. 33.5% of all households were made up of individuals, and 18.1% had someone living alone who was 65 years of age or older. The average household size was 2.27 and the average family size was 2.86.

The median age in the city was 40.6 years. 24.1% of residents were under the age of 18; 5.9% were between the ages of 18 and 24; 26.7% were from 25 to 44; 22.1% were from 45 to 64; and 21.3% were 65 years of age or older. The gender makeup of the city was 47.1% male and 52.9% female.

=== 2000 census ===
As of the census of 2000, there were 424 people, 188 households, and 103 families living in the city. The population density was 130.6 inhabitants per square mile (50.4/km^{2}). There were 196 housing units at an average density of 60.4 per square mile (23.3/km^{2}). The racial makeup of the city was 99.06% White, 0.47% Asian, and 0.47% from two or more races. Hispanic or Latino of any race were 0.94% of the population.

There were 188 households, out of which 25.0% had children under the age of 18 living with them, 47.3% were married couples living together, 5.9% had a female householder with no husband present, and 44.7% were non-families. 40.4% of all households were made up of individuals, and 25.5% had someone living alone who was 65 years of age or older. The average household size was 2.26 and the average family size was 3.14.

In the city, the population was spread out, with 25.9% under 18, 6.8% from 18 to 24, 25.0% from 25 to 44, 16.5% from 45 to 64, and 25.7% who were 65 or older. The median age was 40. For every 100 females, there were 93.6 males. For every 100 females 18 and over, there were 91.5 males.

The median income for a household in the city was $30,000, and the median income for a family was $48,333. Males had a median income of $31,731 versus $19,821 for females. The per capita income was $16,382. About 9.4% of families and 13.7% of the population were below the poverty line, including 15.3% of those under 18 and 20.9% of 65 or over.

== Government ==
The Upsala City Council has five members. Councilors are elected to a four-year term while the mayor is elected to a two-year term. Council members and the mayor must reside within the city.

== Education ==
=== Upsala area schools ===
This central Minnesota school is host to about 400 students in grades K-12. The school brought country schools together in 1922. The original 1922 building was torn down in 2004 and the new school building was built. There is an elementary, middle, and high school section all in one school. The school is the home of the Cardinals. In football, baseball, and track & field, Upsala combines with Swanville Area Schools as the Upsala Swanville Area (USA) Patriots. The Upsala Cardinal boys' basketball team competed at the state level in 2011 and 2013. The Upsala girls' basketball team also made it to the state tournament in 2013. The USA Patriot football team competed at the state level in 2012 and 2013. Other clubs the high school offers include FFA, Team 4480 UC-Botics, Drama Club, and Knowledge Bowl.

== Events ==
=== Upsala Heritage Days ===
UHD is held annually in the second week of August. The weekend-long celebration includes a Medallion Hunt, collector car show, a 5K, concerts in the park, and a parade.
