= Rosing Township, Morrison County, Minnesota =

Rosing Township, Minnesota
- Township
- Location within the state of Minnesota Rosing Township, Minnesota (the United States)
- Coordinates: 46°18′19″N 94°26′13″W
- Country: United States
- State: Minnesota
- County: Morrison

Area
  - Total: 19.3 sq mi (50.0 km^{2})
  - Land: 18.1 sq mi (47.0 km^{2})
  - Water: 1.2 sq mi (3.0 km^{2})
- Elevation: 1,302 ft (397 m)

Population (2000)
  - Total: 135
  - Density: 7.5/sq mi (2.9/km^{2})
- Time zone: UTC-6 (Central (CST))
  - Summer (DST): UTC-5 (CDT)
- FIPS code: 27-55906
- GNIS feature ID: 0665472

Rosing Township is a township in Morrison County, Minnesota, United States. The population was 135 at the 2000 census.

Rosing Township was organized in 1902, and named for Leonard Rosing, a candidate in the Minnesota gubernatorial election, 1902.

== Geography ==
According to the United States Census Bureau, the township has a total area of 19.3 square miles (50.0 km^{2}), of which 18.1 square miles (47.0 km^{2}) is land and 1.1 square miles (3.0 km^{2}) (5.96%) is water.

It lies to the south of the Mississippi River.

== Demographics ==
As of the census of 2000, there were 135 people, 53 households, and 41 families residing in the township. The population density was 7.4 people per square mile (2.9/km^{2}). There were 92 housing units at an average density of 5.1/sq mi (2.0/km^{2}). The racial makeup of the township was 98.52% White and 1.48% Native American.

There were 53 households, out of which 39.6% had children under the age of 18 living with them, 66.0% were married couples living together, 3.8% had a female householder with no husband present, and 20.8% were non-families. 18.9% of all households were made up of individuals, and 11.3% had someone living alone who was 65 years of age or older. The average household size was 2.55 and the average family size was 2.88.

In the township the population was spread out, with 29.6% under the age of 18, 3.0% from 18 to 24, 31.9% from 25 to 44, 25.2% from 45 to 64, and 10.4% who were 65 years of age or older. The median age was 35 years. For every 100 females, there were 117.7 males. For every 100 females age 18 and over, there were 111.1 males.

The median income for a household in the township was $43,500, and the median income for a family was $44,000. Males had a median income of $35,893 versus $26,250 for females. The per capita income for the township was $19,955. There were 4.2% of families and 5.3% of the population living below the poverty line, including no under eighteens and 12.5% of those over 64.
