= Darling Township, Morrison County, Minnesota =

Darling Township, Minnesota
- Township
- Location within the state of Minnesota Darling Township, Minnesota (the United States)
- Coordinates: 46°4′32″N 94°26′28″W
- Country: United States
- State: Minnesota
- County: Morrison

Area
  - Total: 34.2 sq mi (88.6 km^{2})
  - Land: 33.9 sq mi (87.9 km^{2})
  - Water: 0.27 sq mi (0.7 km^{2})
- Elevation: 1,150 ft (350 m)

Population (2000)
  - Total: 600
  - Density: 18/sq mi (6.8/km^{2})
- Time zone: UTC-6 (Central (CST))
  - Summer (DST): UTC-5 (CDT)
- FIPS code: 27-14806
- GNIS feature ID: 0663926

Darling Township is a township in Morrison County, Minnesota, United States. The population was 600 at the 2000 census.

Darling Township was originally called Randall Township, and under the latter name was organized in 1891. The present name adopted in 1907, is for William L. Darling, a railroad official.

== Geography ==
According to the United States Census Bureau, the township has a total area of 34.2 square miles (89 km^{2}), of which 33.9 square miles (88 km^{2}) is land and 0.3 square miles (0.78 km^{2}) (0.79%) is water.

== Demographics ==
As of the census of 2000, there were 600 people, 211 households, and 171 families residing in the township. The population density was 17.7 inhabitants per square mile (6.8/km^{2}). There were 231 housing units at an average density of 6.8 per square mile (2.6/km^{2}). The racial makeup of the township was 97.83% White, 0.83% African American, 0.17% Native American, 0.83% Asian, and 0.33% from two or more races.

There were 211 households, out of which 35.1% had children under the age of 18 living with them, 72.5% were married couples living together, 3.3% had a female householder with no husband present, and 18.5% were non-families. 16.1% of all households were made up of individuals, and 7.1% had someone living alone who was 65 years of age or older. The average household size was 2.84 and the average family size was 3.17.

In the township the population was spread out, with 27.7% under the age of 18, 7.7% from 18 to 24, 25.7% from 25 to 44, 27.0% from 45 to 64, and 12.0% who were 65 years of age or older. The median age was 39 years. For every 100 females, there were 104.1 males. For every 100 females age 18 and over, there were 114.9 males.

The median income for a household in the township was $46,875, and the median income for a family was $51,719. Males had a median income of $30,568 versus $23,125 for females. The per capita income for the township was $17,415. About 3.6% of families and 6.5% of the population were below the poverty line, including 10.7% of those under age 18 and 3.4% of those age 65 or over.
