= Richardson Township, Morrison County, Minnesota =

Richardson Township, Minnesota
- Township
- Location within the state of Minnesota Richardson Township, Minnesota (the United States)
- Coordinates: 46°7′38″N 93°53′23″W
- Country: United States
- State: Minnesota
- County: Morrison

Area
  - Total: 36.2 sq mi (93.8 km^{2})
  - Land: 34.1 sq mi (88.4 km^{2})
  - Water: 2.1 sq mi (5.4 km^{2})
- Elevation: 1,280 ft (390 m)

Population (2000)
  - Total: 485
  - Density: 14/sq mi (5.5/km^{2})
- Time zone: UTC-6 (Central (CST))
  - Summer (DST): UTC-5 (CDT)
- ZIP code: 56338
- Area code: 320
- FIPS code: 27-54178
- GNIS feature ID: 0665411

Richardson Township is a township in Morrison County, Minnesota, United States. The population was 485 at the 2000 census.

Richardson Township was organized in 1903, and named for Nathan Richardson, a state legislator.

== Geography ==
According to the United States Census Bureau, the township has a total area of 36.2 square miles (93.8 km^{2}), of which 34.2 square miles (88.4 km^{2}) is land and 2.1 square miles (5.4 km^{2}) (5.72%) is water.

== Demographics ==
As of the census of 2000, there were 485 people, 209 households, and 152 families residing in the township. The population density was 14.2 people per square mile (5.5/km^{2}). There were 412 housing units at an average density of 12.1/sq mi (4.7/km^{2}). The racial makeup of the township was 97.32% White, 0.21% African American, 0.62% Native American, 0.41% Asian, 1.03% from other races, and 0.41% from two or more races. Hispanic or Latino of any race were 1.44% of the population.

There were 209 households, out of which 27.3% had children under the age of 18 living with them, 63.2% were married couples living together, 5.7% had a female householder with no husband present, and 26.8% were non-families. 24.4% of all households were made up of individuals, and 9.6% had someone living alone who was 65 years of age or older. The average household size was 2.32 and the average family size was 2.73.

In the township the population was spread out, with 21.9% under the age of 18, 4.3% from 18 to 24, 25.2% from 25 to 44, 29.9% from 45 to 64, and 18.8% who were 65 years of age or older. The median age was 44 years. For every 100 females, there were 113.7 males. For every 100 females age 18 and over, there were 108.2 males.

The median income for a household in the township was $33,438, and the median income for a family was $39,306. Males had a median income of $26,375 versus $20,375 for females. The per capita income for the township was $16,531. About 6.5% of families and 8.3% of the population were below the poverty line, including 8.2% of those under age 18 and 8.7% of those age 65 or over.
