= Lakin Township, Morrison County, Minnesota =

Lakin Township, Minnesota
- Township
- Location within the state of Minnesota Lakin Township, Minnesota (the United States)
- Coordinates: 45°51′33″N 93°51′34″W
- Country: United States
- State: Minnesota
- County: Morrison

Area
  - Total: 35.8 sq mi (92.8 km^{2})
  - Land: 35.8 sq mi (92.8 km^{2})
  - Water: 0 sq mi (0.0 km^{2})
- Elevation: 1,240 ft (378 m)

Population (2000)
  - Total: 409
  - Density: 11/sq mi (4.4/km^{2})
- Time zone: UTC-6 (Central (CST))
  - Summer (DST): UTC-5 (CDT)
- FIPS code: 27-35252
- GNIS feature ID: 0664713

Lakin Township is a township in Morrison County, Minnesota, United States. The population was 409 at the 2000 census.

Lakin Township was organized in 1903, and named in honor of Fred H. Lakin, a county official.

== Geography ==
According to the United States Census Bureau, the township has a total area of 35.8 square miles (93 km^{2}), all land.

== Demographics ==
As of the census of 2000, there were 409 people, 138 households, and 100 families residing in the township. The population density was 11.4 inhabitants per square mile (4.4/km^{2}). There were 158 housing units at an average density of 4.4 per square mile (1.7/km^{2}). The racial makeup of the township was 98.53% White, 1.22% Native American, 0.24% from other races. Hispanic or Latino of any race were 0.24% of the population.

There were 138 households, out of which 39.9% had children under the age of 18 living with them, 58.7% were married couples living together, 8.0% had a female householder with no husband present, and 27.5% were non-families. 23.2% of all households were made up of individuals, and 5.1% had someone living alone who was 65 years of age or older. The average household size was 2.96 and the average family size was 3.50.

In the township the population was spread out, with 29.6% under the age of 18, 8.3% from 18 to 24, 32.3% from 25 to 44, 20.3% from 45 to 64, and 9.5% who were 65 years of age or older. The median age was 33 years. For every 100 females, there were 117.6 males. For every 100 females age 18 and over, there were 134.1 males.

The median income for a household in the township was $38,500, and the median income for a family was $40,833. Males had a median income of $30,000 versus $21,875 for females. The per capita income for the township was $14,415. About 13.7% of families and 13.9% of the population were below the poverty line, including 20.7% of those under age 18 and 17.6% of those age 65 or over.
