= Pulaski Township, Morrison County, Minnesota =

Pulaski Township, Minnesota
- Township
- Location within the state of Minnesota Pulaski Township, Minnesota (the United States)
- Coordinates: 46°8′13″N 93°58′19″W
- Country: United States
- State: Minnesota
- County: Morrison

Area
  - Total: 32.3 sq mi (83.7 km^{2})
  - Land: 31.0 sq mi (80.2 km^{2})
  - Water: 1.4 sq mi (3.5 km^{2})
- Elevation: 1,266 ft (386 m)

Population (2000)
  - Total: 340
  - Density: 11/sq mi (4.2/km^{2})
- Time zone: UTC-6 (Central (CST))
  - Summer (DST): UTC-5 (CDT)
- FIPS code: 27-52720
- GNIS feature ID: 0665364

Pulaski Township is a township in Morrison County, Minnesota, United States. The population was 340 at the 2000 census.

Pulaski Township was organized in 1899, and named after Casimir Pulaski- a Polish soldier and nobleman.

== Geography ==
According to the United States Census Bureau, the township has a total area of 32.3 square miles (83.7 km^{2}), of which 31.0 square miles (80.2 km^{2}) is land and 1.4 square miles (3.5 km^{2}) (4.18%) is water.

== Demographics ==
As of the census of 2000, there were 340 people, 134 households, and 93 families residing in the township. The population density was 11.0 people per square mile (4.2/km^{2}). There were 236 housing units at an average density of 7.6/sq mi (2.9/km^{2}). The racial makeup of the township was 99.12% White, 0.59% Native American, and 0.29% from two or more races.

There were 134 households, out of which 29.1% had children under the age of 18 living with them, 58.2% were married couples living together, 6.0% had a female householder with no husband present, and 29.9% were non-families. 26.9% of all households were made up of individuals, and 11.2% had someone living alone who was 65 years of age or older. The average household size was 2.54 and the average family size was 3.10.

In the township the population was spread out, with 25.3% under the age of 18, 9.1% from 18 to 24, 23.5% from 25 to 44, 25.9% from 45 to 64, and 16.2% who were 65 years of age or older. The median age was 38 years. For every 100 females, there were 104.8 males. For every 100 females age 18 and over, there were 108.2 males.

The median income for a household in the township was $36,667, and the median income for a family was $42,292. Males had a median income of $26,500 versus $25,000 for females. The per capita income for the township was $16,199. About 14.1% of families and 20.5% of the population were below the poverty line, including 19.2% of those under age 18 and 25.0% of those age 65 or over.
