= Agram Township, Morrison County, Minnesota =

Agram Township, Minnesota
- Township
- Location within the state of Minnesota Agram Township, Minnesota (the United States)
- Coordinates: 45°57′41″N 94°10′29″W
- Country: United States
- State: Minnesota
- County: Morrison

Area
  - Total: 20.1 sq mi (52.0 km^{2})
  - Land: 19.7 sq mi (51.0 km^{2})
  - Water: 0.42 sq mi (1.1 km^{2})
- Elevation: 1,129 ft (344 m)

Population (2000)
  - Total: 534
  - Density: 27/sq mi (10.5/km^{2})
- Time zone: UTC-6 (Central (CST))
  - Summer (DST): UTC-5 (CDT)
- FIPS code: 27-00406
- GNIS feature ID: 0663387

Agram Township is a township in Morrison County, Minnesota, United States. The population was 534 at the 2000 census.

== History ==
Agram Township is named for Zagreb (present-day capital of Croatia), which was once known by the Austrian German name of Agram.

== Geography ==
According to the United States Census Bureau, the township has a total area of 20.1 square miles (52 km^{2}), of which 19.7 square miles (51 km^{2}) is land and 0.4 square miles (1.0 km^{2}) (2.04%) is water.

== Demographics ==
As of the census of 2000, there were 534 people, 171 households, and 140 families residing in the township. The population density was 27.1 inhabitants per square mile (10.5/km^{2}). There were 199 housing units at an average density of 10.1/sq mi (3.9/km^{2}). The racial makeup of the township was 99.44% White, 0.37% Asian, and 0.19% from two or more races.

There were 171 households, out of which 44.4% had children under the age of 18 living with them, 74.9% were married couples living together, 4.1% had a female householder with no husband present, and 18.1% were non-families. 14.6% of all households were made up of individuals, and 2.9% had someone living alone who was 65 years of age or older. The average household size was 3.12 and the average family size was 3.46.

In the township the population was spread out, with 32.8% under the age of 18, 8.6% from 18 to 24, 30.1% from 25 to 44, 19.3% from 45 to 64, and 9.2% who were 65 years of age or older. The median age was 32 years. For every 100 females, there were 119.8 males. For every 100 females age 18 and over, there were 115.0 males.

The median income for a household in the township was $45,500, and the median income for a family was $50,500. Males had a median income of $37,500 versus $23,958 for females. The per capita income for the township was $17,133. About 4.1% of families and 7.6% of the population were below the poverty line, including 7.6% of those under age 18 and 8.0% of those age 65 or over.
