= Leigh Township, Morrison County, Minnesota =

Leigh Township, Minnesota
- Township
- Location within the state of Minnesota Leigh Township, Minnesota (the United States)
- Coordinates: 46°2′7″N 93°54′55″W
- Country: United States
- State: Minnesota
- County: Morrison

Area
  - Total: 36.1 sq mi (93.4 km^{2})
  - Land: 35.9 sq mi (93.1 km^{2})
  - Water: 0.077 sq mi (0.2 km^{2})
- Elevation: 1,309 ft (399 m)

Population (2000)
  - Total: 192
  - Density: 5.4/sq mi (2.1/km^{2})
- Time zone: UTC-6 (Central (CST))
  - Summer (DST): UTC-5 (CDT)
- FIPS code: 27-36350
- GNIS feature ID: 0664750

Leigh Township is a township in Morrison County, Minnesota, United States. The population was 192 at the 2000 census.

Leigh Township was organized in 1908, and named for Joseph P. Leigh, an early settler.

== Geography ==
According to the United States Census Bureau, the township has a total area of 36.0 square miles (93 km^{2}), of which 36.0 square miles (93 km^{2}) is land and 0.1 square miles (0.26 km^{2}) (0.22%) is water.

== Demographics ==
As of the census of 2000, there were 192 people, 70 households, and 51 families residing in the township. The population density was 5.3 inhabitants per square mile (2.0/km^{2}). There were 91 housing units at an average density of 2.5 per square mile (0.97/km^{2}). The racial makeup of the township was 93.75% White, 5.21% Native American, and 1.04% from two or more races. Hispanic or Latino of any race were 1.04% of the population.

There were 70 households, out of which 35.7% had children under the age of 18 living with them, 58.6% were married couples living together, 7.1% had a female householder with no husband present, and 27.1% were non-families. 21.4% of all households were made up of individuals, and 10.0% had someone living alone who was 65 years of age or older. The average household size was 2.74 and the average family size was 3.18.

In the township the population was spread out, with 29.2% under the age of 18, 7.3% from 18 to 24, 32.8% from 25 to 44, 18.2% from 45 to 64, and 12.5% who were 65 years of age or older. The median age was 36 years. For every 100 females, there were 106.5 males. For every 100 females age 18 and over, there were 119.4 males.

The median income for a household in the township was $26,563, and the median income for a family was $41,250. Males had a median income of $35,000 versus $23,750 for females. The per capita income for the township was $12,572. About 11.1% of families and 17.0% of the population were below the poverty line, including 2.0% of those under the age of eighteen and 76.9% of those 65 or over.
