= Parker Township, Morrison County, Minnesota =

Parker Township, Minnesota
- Township
- Location within the state of Minnesota Parker Township, Minnesota (the United States)
- Coordinates: 46°4′0″N 94°35′0″W
- Country: United States
- State: Minnesota
- County: Morrison

Area
  - Total: 38.4 sq mi (99.5 km^{2})
  - Land: 38.4 sq mi (99.5 km^{2})
  - Water: 0 sq mi (0.0 km^{2})
- Elevation: 1,243 ft (379 m)

Population (2000)
  - Total: 469
  - Density: 12/sq mi (4.7/km^{2})
- Time zone: UTC-6 (Central (CST))
  - Summer (DST): UTC-5 (CDT)
- ZIP code: 56475
- Area code: 320
- FIPS code: 27-49714
- GNIS feature ID: 0665256

Parker Township is a township in Morrison County, Minnesota, United States. The population was 469 at the 2000 census.

Parker Township was organized in 1880, and named for George F. Parker, a pioneer settler.

== Geography ==
According to the United States Census Bureau, the township has a total area of 38.4 square miles (99.5 km^{2}), all land.

== Demographics ==
As of the census of 2010, there were 474 people, 155 households, and 128 families residing in the township. The population density was 12.2 people per square mile (4.7/km^{2}). There were 162 housing units at an average density of 4.2/sq mi (1.6/km^{2}). The racial makeup of the township was 98.72% White, 1.28% from other races. Hispanic or Latino of any race were 1.28% of the population.

There were 155 households, out of which 35.5% had children under the age of 18 living with them, 76.1% were married couples living together, 2.6% had a female householder with no husband present, and 17.4% were non-families. 15.5% of all households were made up of individuals, and 7.1% had someone living alone who was 65 years of age or older. The average household size was 3.03 and the average family size was 3.38.

In the township the population was spread out, with 29.4% under the age of 18, 9.0% from 18 to 24, 26.9% from 25 to 44, 24.1% from 45 to 64, and 10.7% who were 65 years of age or older. The median age was 36 years. For every 100 females, there were 105.7 males. For every 100 females age 18 and over, there were 119.2 males.

The median income for a household in the township was $38,250, and the median income for a family was $39,375. Males had a median income of $30,179 versus $23,125 for females. The per capita income for the township was $14,805. About 7.2% of families and 8.8% of the population were below the poverty line, including 6.4% of those under age 18 and 16.7% of those age 65 or over.
