= Crane Meadows National Wildlife Refuge =

National wildlife refuge in Minnesota, United States

- IUCN category IV (habitat/species management area)
- Location within the United States
- Location: Morrison County, Minnesota, United States
- Nearest city: Little Falls, Minnesota
- Coordinates: 45.9414°N 94.21°W
- Area: 13,540 acres (54.8 km^{2})
- Established: 1992
- Governing body: U.S. Fish and Wildlife Service
- Website: Crane Meadows National Wildlife Refuge

Crane Meadows National Wildlife Refuge, located in central Minnesota, USA, was established in 1992 to preserve a large, natural wetland complex. It is an essential stop for many species of migrating birds. Located within a large watershed that includes Rice, Skunk and Mud Lakes, Platte and Skunk Rivers, Rice and Buckman Creeks, and sedge meadow wetlands, it harbors one of the largest nesting populations of greater sandhill cranes in Minnesota. Habitats include native tallgrass prairie, oak savanna and wetlands with wild rice stands. With a total authorized acquisition boundary of 13,540 acres (54.8 km^{2}) encompassing this important wetland complex and adjacent uplands, the refuge exists as scattered parcels totaling about 2,000 acres (8.1 km^{2}). Existing ownership lies in Little Falls and Agram townships in Morrison County.

The refuge is the base for the Federal Partners for Fish and Wildlife Program in Morrison County, which focuses on restoring drained wetlands through voluntary agreements with landowners.
