= Culdrum Township, Morrison County, Minnesota =

Culdrum Township, Minnesota
- Township
- Location within the state of Minnesota Culdrum Township, Minnesota (the United States)
- Coordinates: 45°58′1″N 94°35′25″W
- Country: United States
- State: Minnesota
- County: Morrison

Area
  - Total: 33.8 sq mi (87.5 km^{2})
  - Land: 33.6 sq mi (86.9 km^{2})
  - Water: 0.23 sq mi (0.6 km^{2})
- Elevation: 1,227 ft (374 m)

Population (2000)
  - Total: 505
  - Density: 15/sq mi (5.8/km^{2})
- Time zone: UTC-6 (Central (CST))
  - Summer (DST): UTC-5 (CDT)
- FIPS code: 27-14248
- GNIS feature ID: 0663905

Culdrum Township is a township in Morrison County, Minnesota, United States. The population was 505 at the 2000 census.

== History ==
Culdrum Township was organized in 1871. The first settler in the area of the town was J.C. Stebbins who in 1859 located in an area known as Martin place. During the US-Dakota War of 1862 the entire population of township was abandoned. Soon after the war the end of the war John Workman, one of the Little Falls first settlers, selected the name for the township which was named for Culdrum Townland in County Londonderry, his native town in Ireland.

== Geography ==
According to the United States Census Bureau, the township has a total area of 33.8 square miles (88 km^{2}), of which 33.5 square miles (87 km^{2}) is land and 0.2 square miles (0.52 km^{2}) (0.68%) is water.

== Demographics ==
As of the census of 2000, there were 505 people, 165 households, and 130 families residing in the township. The population density was 15.1 inhabitants per square mile (5.8/km^{2}). There were 178 housing units at an average density of 5.3 per square mile (2.0/km^{2}). The racial makeup of the township was 99.60% White, and 0.40% from two or more races. Hispanic or Latino of any race were 0.59% of the population.

There were 165 households, out of which 44.8% had children under the age of 18 living with them, 69.7% were married couples living together, 5.5% had a female householder with no husband present, and 21.2% were non-families. 18.8% of all households were made up of individuals, and 10.3% had someone living alone who was 65 years of age or older. The average household size was 3.06 and the average family size was 3.54.

In the township the population was spread out, with 35.6% under the age of 18, 5.0% from 18 to 24, 26.5% from 25 to 44, 19.8% from 45 to 64, and 13.1% who were 65 years of age or older. The median age was 36 years. For every 100 females, there were 102.0 males. For every 100 females age 18 and over, there were 108.3 males.

The median income for a household in the township was $34,712, and the median income for a family was $46,250. Males had a median income of $26,250 versus $19,375 for females. The per capita income for the township was $14,174. About 3.1% of families and 3.5% of the population were below the poverty line, including 1.3% of those under age 18 and 9.6% of those age 65 or over.
