= Bellevue Township, Morrison County, Minnesota =

Bellevue Township, Minnesota
- Township
- Location within the state of Minnesota Bellevue Township, Minnesota (the United States)
- Coordinates: 45°52′42″N 94°17′8″W
- Country: United States
- State: Minnesota
- County: Morrison

Area
  - Total: 45.8 sq mi (118.5 km^{2})
  - Land: 45.1 sq mi (116.8 km^{2})
  - Water: 0.66 sq mi (1.7 km^{2})
- Elevation: 1,112 ft (339 m)

Population (2000)
  - Total: 1,115
  - Density: 25/sq mi (9.5/km^{2})
- Time zone: UTC-6 (Central (CST))
  - Summer (DST): UTC-5 (CDT)
- FIPS code: 27-04942
- GNIS feature ID: 0663559
- Website: https://www.bellevuetownship.com/

Bellevue Township is a township in Morrison County, Minnesota, United States. The population was 1,115 at the 2000 census.

Bellevue Township was organized in 1858. Bellevue is a name derived from French meaning "beautiful view".

== Geography ==
According to the United States Census Bureau, the township has a total area of 45.7 square miles (118 km^{2}), of which 45.1 square miles (117 km^{2}) is land and 0.7 square miles (1.8 km^{2}) (1.44%) is water.

The township is along U.S. Highway 10 near Royalton and Little Falls.

== Demographics ==
As of the census of 2000, there were 1,115 people, 365 households, and 313 families residing in the township. The population density was 24.7 inhabitants per square mile (9.5/km^{2}). There were 382 housing units at an average density of 8.5 per square mile (3.3/km^{2}). The racial makeup of the township was 99.01% White, 0.18% Native American, 0.36% Asian, 0.09% Pacific Islander, 0.09% from other races, and 0.27% from two or more races. Hispanic or Latino of any race were 0.45% of the population.

There were 365 households, out of which 46.8% had children under the age of 18 living with them, 75.1% were married couples living together, 4.9% had a female householder with no husband present, and 14.0% were non-families. 11.2% of all households were made up of individuals, and 3.3% had someone living alone who was 65 years of age or older. The average household size was 3.05 and the average family size was 3.28.

In the township, the population was spread out, with 33.4% under the age of 18, 8.0% from 18 to 24, 26.2% from 25 to 44, 25.4% from 45 to 64, and 7.1% who were 65 years of age or older. The median age was 34 years. For every 100 females, there were 106.1 males. For every 100 females age 18 and over, there were 111.1 males.

The median income for a household in the township was $44,886, and the median income for a family was $49,861. Males had a median income of $30,227 versus $24,125 for females. The per capita income for the township was $15,384. About 8.7% of families and 11.0% of the population were below the poverty line, including 11.8% of those under age 18 and 16.3% of those age 65 or over.
