= Elmdale Township, Morrison County, Minnesota =

Elmdale Township, Minnesota
- Township
- Location within the state of Minnesota Elmdale Township, Minnesota (the United States)
- Coordinates: 45°49′37″N 94°34′0″W
- Country: United States
- State: Minnesota
- County: Morrison

Area
  - Total: 39.7 sq mi (102.8 km^{2})
  - Land: 38.7 sq mi (100.3 km^{2})
  - Water: 0.97 sq mi (2.5 km^{2})
- Elevation: 1,211 ft (369 m)

Population (2000)
  - Total: 904
  - Density: 23/sq mi (9/km^{2})
- Time zone: UTC-6 (Central (CST))
  - Summer (DST): UTC-5 (CDT)
- FIPS code: 27-18890
- GNIS feature ID: 0664081

Elmdale Township is a township in Morrison County, Minnesota, United States. The population was 904 at the 2000 census.

Elmdale Township was organized in 1881.

== Geography ==
According to the United States Census Bureau, the township has a total area of 39.7 square miles (103 km^{2}), of which 38.7 square miles (100 km^{2}) is land and 1.0 square mile (2.6 km^{2}) (2.47%) is water.

Minnesota State Highway 238 serves as a main route in the township.

== Demographics ==
As of the census of 2000, there were 904 people, 291 households, and 226 families residing in the township. The population density was 23.3 inhabitants per square mile (9.0/km^{2}). There were 368 housing units at an average density of 9.5 per square mile (3.7/km^{2}). The racial makeup of the township was 99.00% White, 0.22% African American, 0.44% from other races, and 0.33% from two or more races. Hispanic or Latino of any race were 0.44% of the population.

There were 291 households, out of which 45.0% had children under the age of 18 living with them, 71.5% were married couples living together, 2.4% had a female householder with no husband present, and 22.0% were non-families. 19.6% of all households were made up of individuals, and 7.9% had someone living alone who was 65 years of age or older. The average household size was 3.11 and the average family size was 3.65.

In the township the population was spread out, with 35.4% under the age of 18, 6.6% from 18 to 24, 28.3% from 25 to 44, 20.0% from 45 to 64, and 9.6% who were 65 years of age or older. The median age was 33 years. For every 100 females, there were 114.2 males. For every 100 females age 18 and over, there were 126.4 males.

The median income for a household in the township was $41,696, and the median income for a family was $45,000. Males had a median income of $28,929 versus $20,250 for females. The per capita income for the township was $19,406. About 7.5% of families and 7.4% of the population were below the poverty line, including 8.2% of those under age 18 and 18.2% of those age 65 or over.
