= Pierz Township, Morrison County, Minnesota =

Pierz Township, Minnesota
- Township
- Location within the state of Minnesota Pierz Township, Minnesota (the United States)
- Coordinates: 45°56′44″N 94°5′0″W
- Country: United States
- State: Minnesota
- County: Morrison

Area
  - Total: 28.1 sq mi (72.9 km^{2})
  - Land: 28.1 sq mi (72.9 km^{2})
  - Water: 0 sq mi (0.0 km^{2})
- Elevation: 1,240 ft (378 m)

Population (2000)
  - Total: 513
  - Density: 18/sq mi (7/km^{2})
- Time zone: UTC-6 (Central (CST))
  - Summer (DST): UTC-5 (CDT)
- ZIP code: 56364
- Area code: 320
- FIPS code: 27-50794
- GNIS feature ID: 0665293

Pierz Township is a township in Morrison County, Minnesota, United States. The population was 513 at the 2000 census.

Pierz Township was organized in 1869, and named for Francis Xavier Pierz, Catholic missionary to the Ottawa and Ojibwa Indians.

== Geography ==
According to the United States Census Bureau, the township has a total area of 28.2 square miles (72.9 km^{2}), all land.

== Demographics ==
As of the census of 2000, there were 513 people, 161 households, and 141 families residing in the township. The population density was 18.2 people per square mile (7.0/km^{2}). There were 165 housing units at an average density of 5.9/sq mi (2.3/km^{2}). The racial makeup of the township was 100.00% White. Hispanic or Latino of any race were 0.19% of the population.

There were 161 households, out of which 46.0% had children under the age of 18 living with them, 77.0% were married couples living together, 3.7% had a female householder with no husband present, and 12.4% were non-families. 11.2% of all households were made up of individuals, and 4.3% had someone living alone who was 65 years of age or older. The average household size was 3.19 and the average family size was 3.43.

In the township the population was spread out, with 32.9% under the age of 18, 7.4% from 18 to 24, 26.9% from 25 to 44, 23.6% from 45 to 64, and 9.2% who were 65 years of age or older. The median age was 33 years. For every 100 females, there were 129.0 males. For every 100 females age 18 and over, there were 121.9 males.

The median income for a household in the township was $40,682, and the median income for a family was $43,750. Males had a median income of $28,438 versus $20,865 for females. The per capita income for the township was $15,071. About 10.8% of families and 13.0% of the population were below the poverty line, including 14.4% of those under age 18 and 17.4% of those age 65 or over.
