= Minnesota State Highway 238 =

State highway in Minnesota, United States

Trunk Highway 238
- MN 238 highlighted in red

Route information
- Maintained by MnDOT
- Length: 34.709 mi (55.859 km)
- Existed: July 1, 1949–present

Major junctions
- South end: I-94 / US 52 at Albany
- North end: MN 27 / MN 28 near Little Falls

Location
- Country: United States
- State: Minnesota
- Counties: Stearns, Morrison

Highway system
- Minnesota Trunk Highway System; Interstate; US; State; Legislative; Scenic
← MN 237	→ MN 241

Minnesota State Highway 238 (MN 238) is a 34.709-mile-long (55.859 km) highway in central Minnesota, which runs from its interchange with Interstate 94 and Stearns County State-Aid Highway 10 in Albany and continues north to its northern terminus at its intersection with State Highways 27 / 28 near Little Falls.

== Route description ==
Highway 238 serves as a north–south route in central Minnesota between the cities of Albany and Little Falls.

Highway 238 changes direction to east–west in Upsala and continues as east–west for 8 miles before returning again to a north–south direction near Bowlus for the remainder of its route towards Little Falls.

The highway is officially marked as a north–south route by its highway shields from beginning to end.

In the city of Albany, Highway 238 follows 8th Street South, Railroad Avenue, and 1st Street. Railroad Avenue was the alignment of former U.S. Highway 52 until I-94 was constructed.

The route passes around the east side of North Lake in Albany.

Highway 238 is also known as Main Street in Upsala.

The route is legally defined as Route 238 in the Minnesota Statutes.

== History ==
Highway 238 was authorized on July 1, 1949.

At the time it was marked, the highway was paved between Elmdale and Bowlus and a small section at its northern end. The segment between Upsala and the Morrison-Stearns county line was paved in 1953. In 1954 or 1955, it was paved from that point south to its terminus at then-U.S. 52. The final remaining segment north of Bowlus was paved in 1957.

== Major intersections ==
County	Location	mi	km	Destinations	Notes
Stearns	Albany	0.000– 0.122	0.000– 0.196	I-94 (US 52) / CSAH 10 – Alexandria, St. Cloud, St. Martin, Roscoe	Interchange; I-94 Exit 147
Stearns	Albany	0.302	0.486	CR 157 / I-94 Alt. west (Railroad Avenue)	Formerly US 52 west
Stearns	Albany	0.791	1.273	CSAH 54 / I-94 Alt. east (Railroad Avenue)	Formerly US 52 east
Morrison	Pike Creek Township	34.867	56.113	MN 27 / MN 28 – Little Falls, Long Prairie	
1.000 mi = 1.609 km; 1.000 km = 0.621 mi
