= Platte River (Minnesota) =

River in Minnesota, United States

Coordinates: 45°46′45″N 94°16′45″W

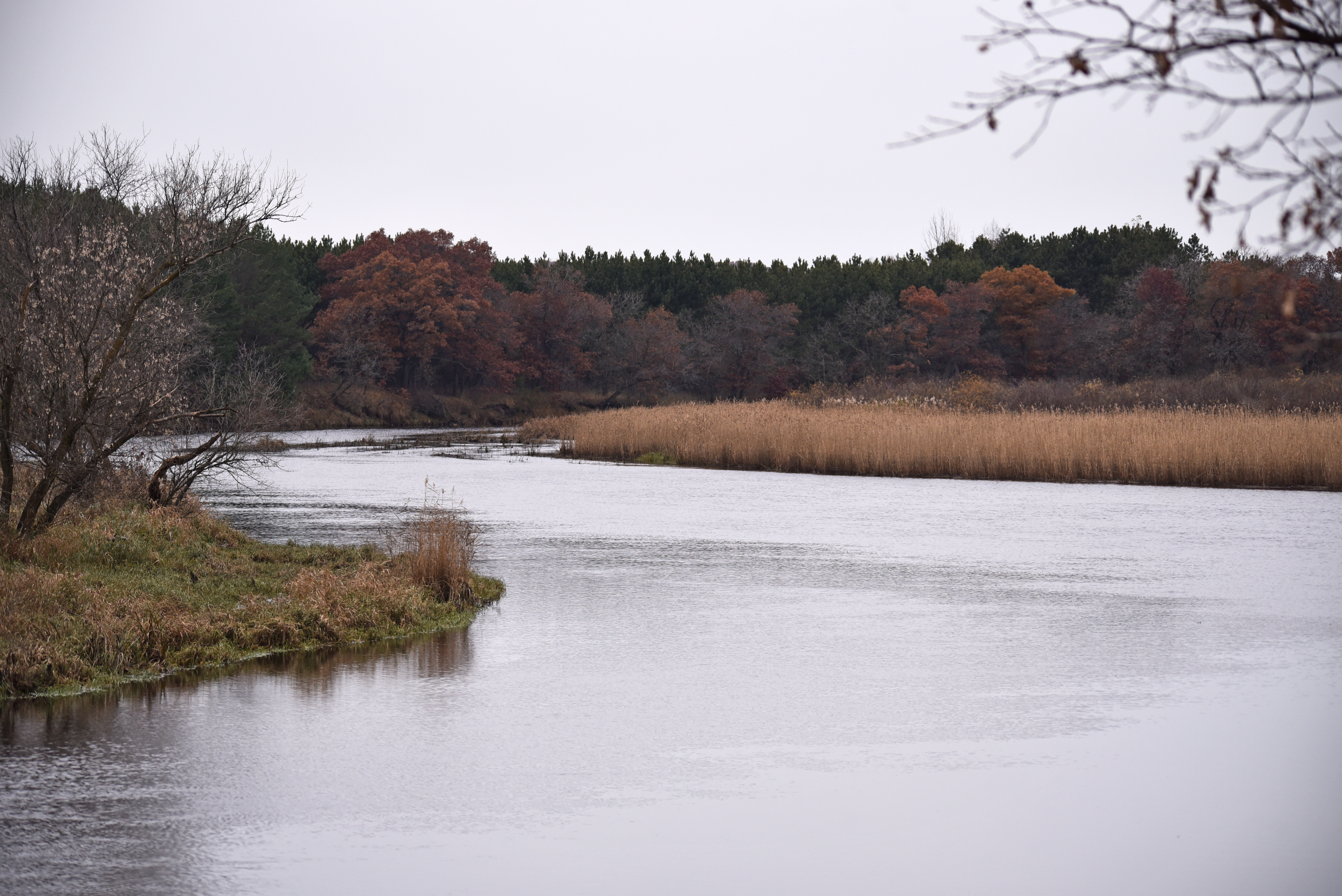
The river at the Crane Meadows National Wildlife Refuge

The Platte River is a tributary of the Mississippi River in central Minnesota in the United States. It is 55.1 miles (88.6 km) long. Platte is a name derived from the French meaning "flat".

== Course ==
The Platte flows from Platte Lake in southeastern Crow Wing County, flows through Lake Sullivan, and Round Lake, and follows a generally southwestward course through eastern Morrison County, through the towns of Harding and Royalton. It flows into the Mississippi River in Benton County, about 3 miles (5 km) south of Royalton.

The Platte's largest tributary is the Skunk River, which joins it in Morrison County.

== See also ==
- List of rivers of Minnesota
