= Morrison County, Minnesota =

County in Minnesota, United States

- County
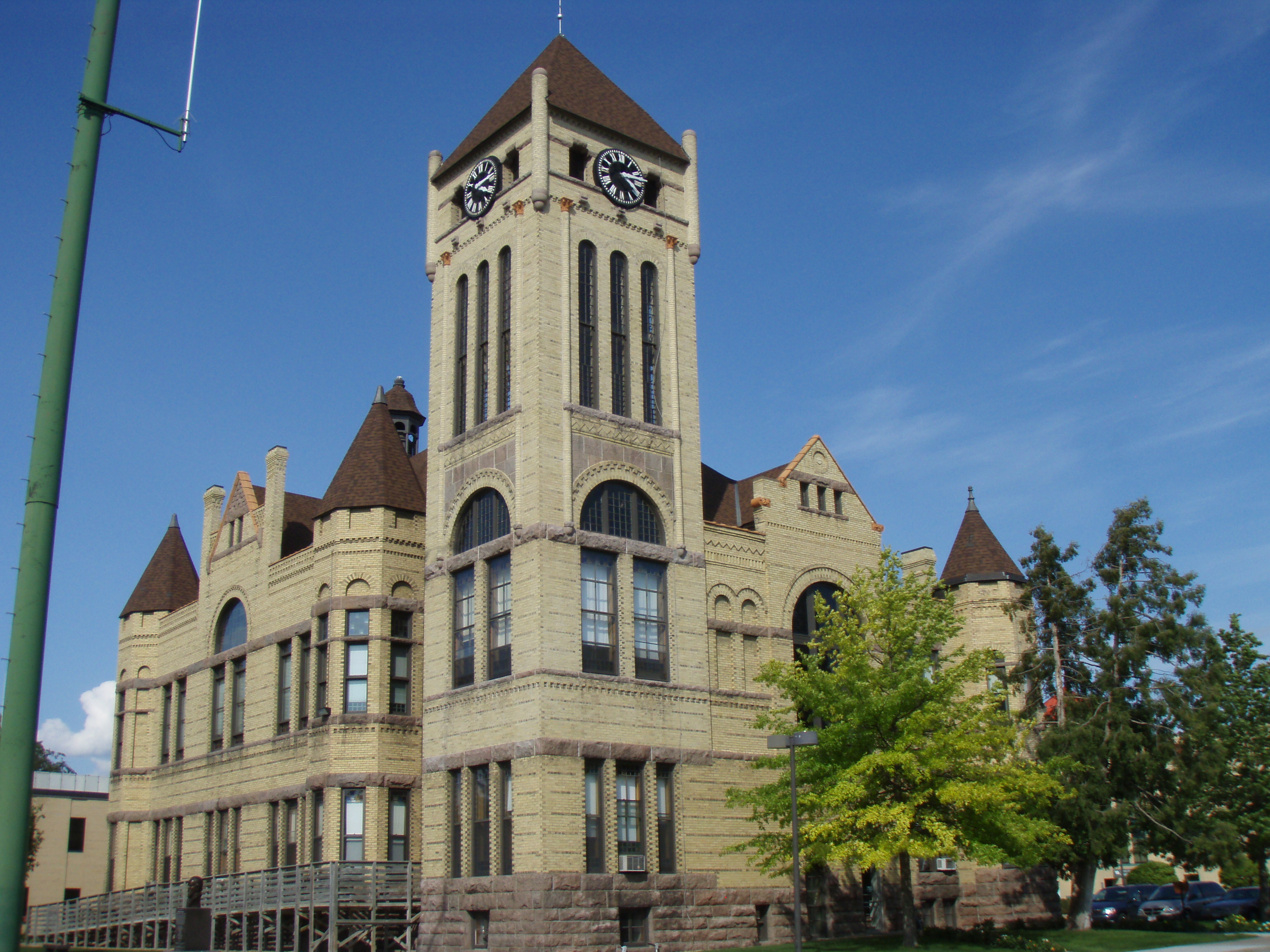
- Morrison County Courthouse

- Location within the U.S. state of Minnesota
- Coordinates: 45°58′00″N 94°22′00″W
- Country: United States
- State: Minnesota
- Founded: February 25, 1856
- Named for: William and Allan Morrison
- Seat: Little Falls
- Largest city: Little Falls

Area
  - Total: 1,153 sq mi (2,990 km^{2})
  - Land: 1,125 sq mi (2,910 km^{2})
  - Water: 28 sq mi (73 km^{2}) 2.5%

Population (2020)
  - Total: 34,010
  - Estimate (2025): 34,620 ▲
  - Density: 30.23/sq mi (11.67/km^{2})
- Time zone: UTC−6 (Central)
  - Summer (DST): UTC−5 (CDT)
- Congressional district: 7th
- Website: morrisoncountymn.gov

Morrison County is a county in the U.S. state of Minnesota. As of the 2020 census, the population was 34,010. Its county seat is Little Falls. Camp Ripley Military Reservation occupies a significant area in north-central Morrison County.

== History ==
Dakotah and Ojibwe Indians lived in central Minnesota around the Mississippi River. French and English fur traders and voyageurs traveled through Minnesota from the 17th century to the 19th century. They used the river to transport their goods and trade with the natives. The county was named for fur trading brothers William and Allan Morrison.

In the 19th century three prominent explorers led expeditions along the river through the area that became Morrison County. Zebulon Pike came through in 1805. Michigan Territory Governor Lewis Cass led an expedition through the area in 1820. Explorer and scientist Joseph Nicollet created the first accurate map of the area along the river in 1836.

Missionaries were some of the area's first European settlers. Methodist missionaries settled temporarily along the Little Elk River in 1838. The Reverend Frederic and Elisabeth (Taylor) Ayer moved to the Belle Prairie area in 1849. They started a mission and school there for the Ojibwe. Father Francis Xavier Pierz came to the area in 1852 and started many communities in central Minnesota, including Sobieski and Rich Prairie (later renamed Pierz) in Morrison County.

The US legislature established the Wisconsin Territory effective July 3, 1836. It existed until its eastern portion was granted statehood (as Wisconsin) in 1848. The federal government set up the Minnesota Territory effective March 3, 1849. The newly organized territorial legislature created nine counties across the territory in October of that year. On February 25, 1856, Benton, one of those original counties, had a portion of its northern section partitioned off to create Morrison County, with Little Falls as the county seat. It was named for William and Allen Morrison, early fur trappers and traders in the area.

The event that prodded further development of the county was the building of Fort Ripley (originally named Ft. Gaines). In order to construct this military outpost, the Little Falls Mill and Land Company built a dam and sawmill in 1849. The company was formed by James Green, Allan Morrison, Henry Rice, John Irvine, John Blair Smith Todd, and Napoleon Jackson Tecumseh Dana. Fort Ripley was ostensibly built to protect the Winnebago Indians, who had been relocated by Henry Rice from Iowa to central Minnesota west of the Mississippi River, between the Crow Wing and Long Prairie rivers. Rice hoped the Winnebago would act as a buffer between the warring Ojibwe and Dakotah. His plan was unsuccessful and in 1855 the Winnebago were moved to the Blue Earth River in southern Minnesota.

The Little Falls area was first settled in 1848, and platted in 1855. Its growth occurred when the Little Falls Company (later called the Little Falls Manufacturing Company) built a second dam. This dam washed out, as had the first, and Little Falls entered a long period of economic depression and stagnant population. Bit by bit, Little Falls grew, until it was officially incorporated as a village in 1879.

Soils of Morrison County

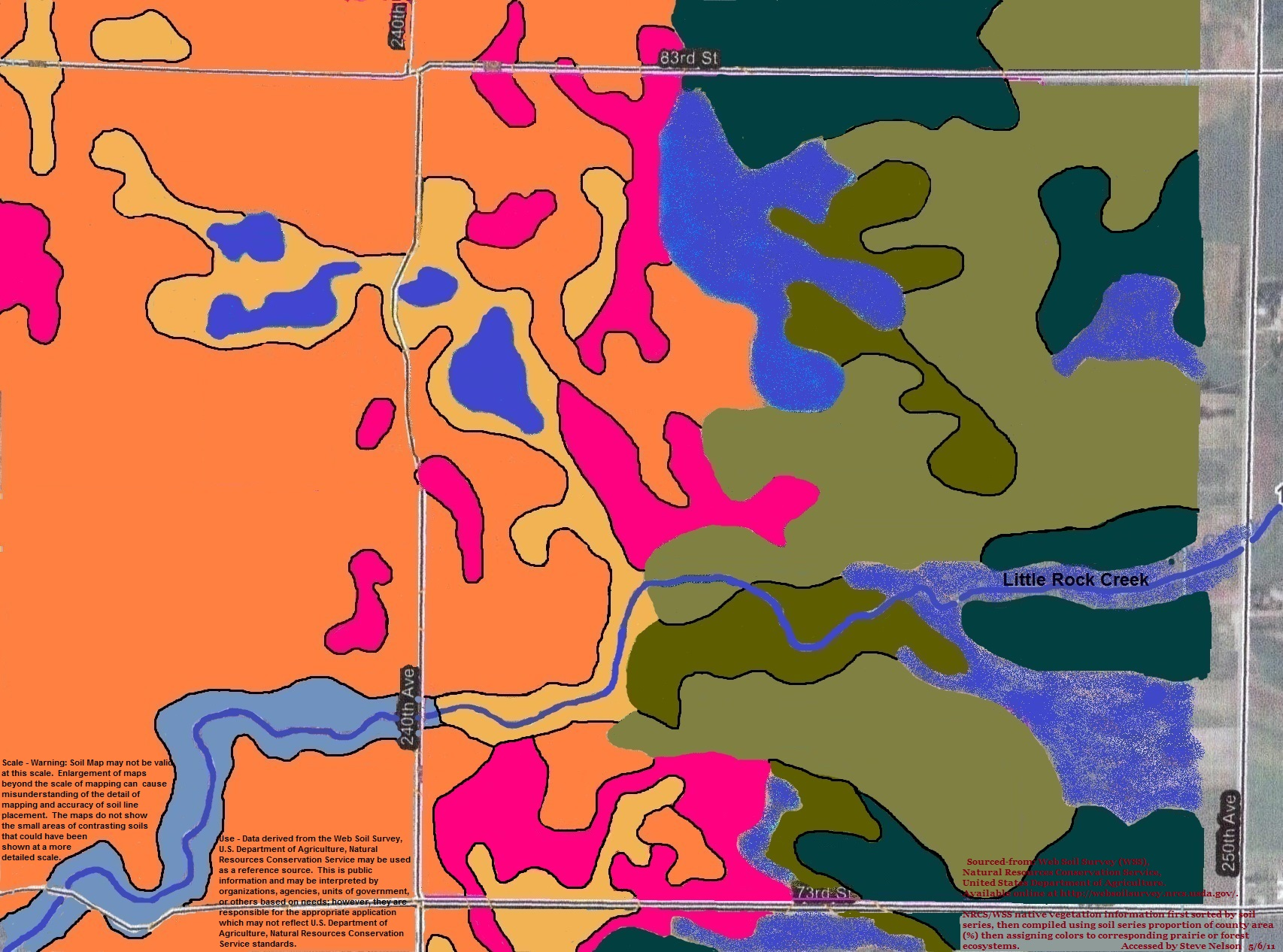
Soils of Rice Area Sportsmen's WMA neighborhood

Another wave of immigration occurred between 1880 and 1920. A wide variety of ethnic groups settled in Morrison County. This wave of immigration was spurred by the construction of the third dam at Little Falls in 1887. A group of investors from Louisville, Kentucky led by M. M. Williams financed the dam. To be sure their investment would succeed, they encouraged other major industries to move to the city, touting the water power.

Pine Tree Lumber Company, run by Charles A. Weyerhaeuser and Richard "Drew" Musser, was one business that took advantage of the water power, with their operations in Little Falls beginning in 1890. Hennepin Paper Company also started operations that year in the city.

In 1889 the Louisville investors drew up a charter to transform Little Falls from a village to a city. Nathan Richardson, one of Morrison County's original organizers, became the city's first mayor.

== Geography ==
The Mississippi River flows south through west-central Morrison County. The Platte River flows south-southwest through the central part of the county, discharging into the Mississippi just at both rivers exit Morrison County at the border with Stearns County. The Little Elk River rises in Morrison County and flows east to discharge into the Mississippi just north of Little Falls, picking up the flow of the South Branch of the Little Elk River at Randall. The Mississippi also receives the flow of the Nokasippi River just above Camp Ripley. The Skunk River rises in the northeast part of the county, and flows west-southwest through the lower central part of the county, discharging into the Platte southeast of Little Falls.

The terrain consists of low rolling hills, partly wooded, carved with drainages and gullies, and with all available area devoted to agriculture. It generally slopes to the south, and slopes to the river valley from both east and west borders, with its highest point on the Camp Ripley Military Reservation, 2.4 miles (3.9 km) east and 1.4 miles (2.3 km) north of the east end of Lake Alexander, at 1,521 ft (464 m) ASL. The county has an area of 1,153 square miles (2,990 km^{2}), of which 1,125 square miles (2,910 km^{2}) is land and 28 square miles (73 km^{2}) (2.5%) is water.

=== Major highways ===
- U.S. Highway 10
- Minnesota State Highway 25
- Minnesota State Highway 27
- Minnesota State Highway 28
- Minnesota State Highway 115
- Minnesota State Highway 238
- Minnesota State Highway 371

=== Airports ===
- Little Falls/Morrison County Airport (LXL) - southeast of Little Falls

=== Adjacent counties ===
- Cass County - north
- Crow Wing County - northeast
- Mille Lacs County - east
- Benton County - southeast
- Stearns County - south
- Todd County - west

=== Protected areas ===
Sources:

- Belle Prairie County Park
- Charles A. Lindbergh State Park
- Coon Lake State Wildlife Management Area
- Crane Meadows National Wildlife Refuge
- Crane Meadows State Wildlife Management Area
- Crow Wing State Park (part)
- Culdrum State Wildlife Management Area
- Ereaua State Wildlife Management Area
- Lake Alexander Woods Scientific and Natural Area
- Little Elk State Wildlife Management Area
- Mud Lake State Wildlife Management Area
- Neitermeier State Wildlife Management Area
- Popple Lake State Wildlife Management Area
- Rice-Skunk Lake State Wildlife Management Area
- Richardson State Wildlife Management Area
- Ripley Esker Scientific and Natural Area
- Sponsa State Wildlife Management Area
- Wittiker State Wildlife Management Area

== Demographics ==
Historical population
Census	Pop.	Note	%±
1860	618		—
1870	1,681		172.0%
1880	5,875		249.5%
1890	13,325		126.8%
1900	22,891		71.8%
1910	24,053		5.1%
1920	25,841		7.4%
1930	25,442		−1.5%
1940	27,473		8.0%
1950	25,832		−6.0%
1960	26,641		3.1%
1970	26,949		1.2%
1980	29,311		8.8%
1990	29,604		1.0%
2000	31,712		7.1%
2010	33,198		4.7%
2020	34,010		2.4%
2025 (est.)	34,620	▲	1.8%
U.S. Decennial Census; 1790-1960 1900-1990; 1990-2000

=== Racial and ethnic composition ===
Morrison County, Minnesota – Racial and ethnic composition Note: the US Census treats Hispanic/Latino as an ethnic category. This table excludes Latinos from the racial categories and assigns them to a separate category. Hispanics/Latinos may be of any race.
Race / Ethnicity (NH = Non-Hispanic)	Pop 1980	Pop 1990	Pop 2000	Pop 2010	Pop 2020	% 1980	% 1990	% 2000	% 2010	% 2020
White alone (NH)	29,125	29,343	31,094	32,174	32,032	99.37%	99.12%	98.05%	96.92%	94.18%
Black or African American alone (NH)	5	33	65	122	179	0.02%	0.11%	0.20%	0.37%	0.53%
Native American or Alaska Native alone (NH)	54	77	99	61	111	0.18%	0.26%	0.31%	0.18%	0.33%
Asian alone (NH)	42	45	78	101	102	0.14%	0.15%	0.25%	0.30%	0.30%
Native Hawaiian or Pacific Islander alone (NH)	x	x	11	9	5	x	x	0.03%	0.03%	0.01%
Other race alone (NH)	24	8	5	8	57	0.08%	0.03%	0.02%	0.02%	0.17%
Mixed race or Multiracial (NH)	x	x	157	321	891	x	x	0.50%	0.97%	2.62%
Hispanic or Latino (any race)	61	98	203	402	633	0.21%	0.33%	0.64%	1.21%	1.86%
Total	29,311	29,604	31,712	33,198	34,010	100.00%	100.00%	100.00%	100.00%	100.00%

=== 2020 census ===
As of the 2020 census, the county had a population of 34,010. The median age was 42.2 years. 23.6% of residents were under the age of 18 and 20.4% of residents were 65 years of age or older. For every 100 females there were 103.0 males, and for every 100 females age 18 and over there were 100.7 males age 18 and over.

The racial makeup of the county was 94.8% White, 0.5% Black or African American, 0.4% American Indian and Alaska Native, 0.3% Asian, <0.1% Native Hawaiian and Pacific Islander, 0.7% from some other race, and 3.2% from two or more races. Hispanic or Latino residents of any race comprised 1.9% of the population.

27.7% of residents lived in urban areas, while 72.3% lived in rural areas.

There were 13,688 households in the county, of which 28.1% had children under the age of 18 living in them. Of all households, 52.2% were married-couple households, 18.9% were households with a male householder and no spouse or partner present, and 21.2% were households with a female householder and no spouse or partner present. About 27.7% of all households were made up of individuals and 13.7% had someone living alone who was 65 years of age or older.

There were 16,074 housing units, of which 14.8% were vacant. Among occupied housing units, 78.1% were owner-occupied and 21.9% were renter-occupied. The homeowner vacancy rate was 1.1% and the rental vacancy rate was 6.2%.

=== 2000 census ===
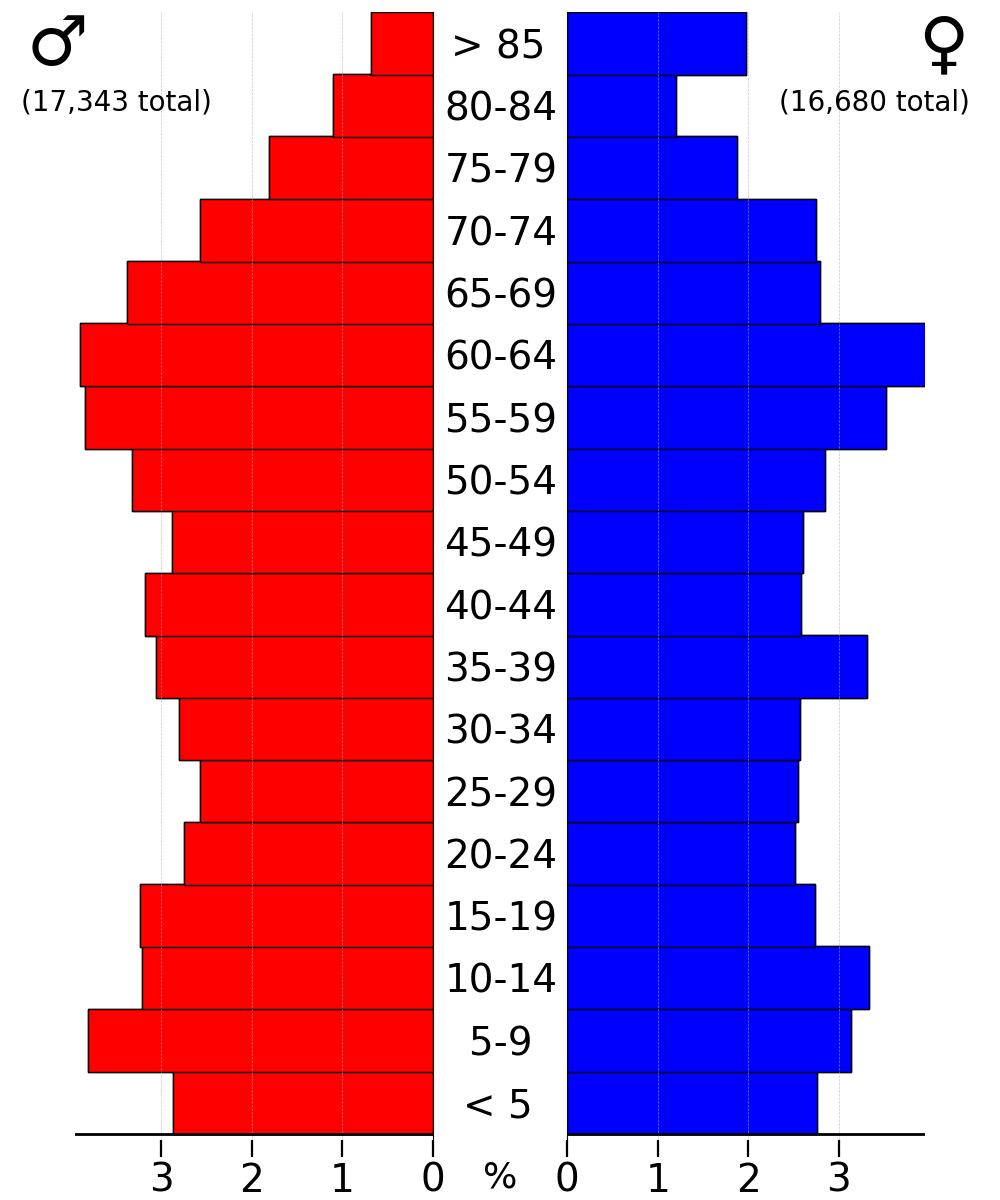
2022 US Census population pyramid for Morrison County, from ACS 5-year estimates

As of the census of 2000, there were 31,712 people, 11,816 households, and 8,460 families in the county. The population density was 28.2 per square mile (10.9/km^{2}). There were 13,870 housing units at an average density of 12.3 per square mile (4.7/km^{2}). The racial makeup of the county was 98.48% White, 0.21% Black or African American, 0.32% Native American, 0.25% Asian, 0.03% Pacific Islander, 0.15% from other races, and 0.55% from two or more races. 0.64% of the population were Hispanic or Latino of any race. 45.4% were of German, 18.8% Polish, 7.3% Norwegian and 5.7% Swedish ancestry. 96.7% spoke English, 1.4% Spanish and 1.2% German as their first language.

There were 11,816 households, out of which 34.50% had children under the age of 18 living with them, 59.40% were married couples living together, 7.80% had a female householder with no husband present, and 28.40% were non-families. 24.90% of all households were made up of individuals, and 11.80% had someone living alone who was 65 years of age or older. The average household size was 2.64 and the average family size was 3.15.

The county population contained 28.00% under the age of 18, 8.00% from 18 to 24, 26.70% from 25 to 44, 21.70% from 45 to 64, and 15.60% who were 65 years of age or older. The median age was 37 years. For every 100 females there were 101.20 males. For every 100 females age 18 and over, there were 99.50 males.

The median income for a household in the county was $37,047, and the median income for a family was $44,175. Males had a median income of $31,037 versus $22,244 for females. The per capita income for the county was $16,566. About 7.50% of families and 11.10% of the population were below the poverty line, including 11.40% of those under age 18 and 18.50% of those age 65 or over.

== Communities ==
=== Cities ===
- Bowlus
- Buckman
- Elmdale
- Flensburg
- Genola
- Harding
- Hillman
- Lastrup
- Little Falls (county seat)
- Motley (part)
- Pierz
- Randall
- Royalton (part)
- Sobieski
- Swanville (part)
- Upsala

=== Unincorporated communities ===
- Belle Prairie
- Center Valley
- Cushing
- Darling
- Freedhem
- Gregory
- Lincoln
- Little Rock
- Morrill
- North Prairie
- Platte
- Ramey
- Shamineau Park
- Sullivan
- Vawter

=== Townships ===
- Agram Township
- Belle Prairie Township
- Bellevue Township
- Buckman Township
- Buh Township
- Culdrum Township
- Cushing Township
- Darling Township
- Elmdale Township
- Granite Township
- Green Prairie Township
- Hillman Township
- Lakin Township
- Leigh Township
- Little Falls Township
- Morrill Township
- Motley Township
- Mount Morris Township
- Parker Township
- Pierz Township
- Pike Creek Township
- Platte Township
- Pulaski Township
- Rail Prairie Township (now defunct)
- Richardson Township
- Ripley Township
- Rosing Township
- Scandia Valley Township
- Swan River Township
- Swanville Township
- Two Rivers Township

== Politics ==
In previous decades, Morrison County voters were fairly balanced, but since 1984 the county has swung Republican, only selecting the Democratic nominee for president twice since 1984. Morrison County has voted Republican at the federal level in every election in the 21st century, with increasingly higher Republican margins each time.

United States presidential election results for Morrison County, Minnesota
Year	Republican		Democratic		Third party(ies)	
Year	No.	%	No.	%	No.	%
1892	1,135	37.76%	1,585	52.73%	286	9.51%
1896	1,960	51.77%	1,734	45.80%	92	2.43%
1900	1,880	49.25%	1,838	48.15%	99	2.59%
1904	2,498	66.74%	1,128	30.14%	117	3.13%
1908	1,936	53.30%	1,513	41.66%	183	5.04%
1912	699	19.18%	1,341	36.79%	1,605	44.03%
1916	1,887	48.84%	1,650	42.70%	327	8.46%
1920	5,371	77.57%	1,131	16.33%	422	6.09%
1924	3,128	41.63%	769	10.23%	3,617	48.14%
1928	3,846	42.18%	5,222	57.27%	51	0.56%
1932	2,198	24.09%	6,712	73.57%	213	2.33%
1936	2,682	27.23%	6,112	62.06%	1,054	10.70%
1940	5,734	52.43%	5,144	47.04%	58	0.53%
1944	5,035	55.93%	3,920	43.55%	47	0.52%
1948	3,922	38.86%	6,026	59.71%	144	1.43%
1952	6,050	56.87%	4,551	42.78%	38	0.36%
1956	5,042	51.84%	4,653	47.84%	32	0.33%
1960	4,403	37.43%	7,337	62.37%	24	0.20%
1964	3,515	31.86%	7,492	67.91%	25	0.23%
1968	4,511	40.08%	6,111	54.29%	634	5.63%
1972	5,714	46.35%	5,993	48.61%	622	5.05%
1976	4,590	34.53%	8,176	61.50%	528	3.97%
1980	6,296	44.91%	6,930	49.44%	792	5.65%
1984	7,556	54.44%	6,225	44.85%	99	0.71%
1988	6,598	49.88%	6,469	48.91%	160	1.21%
1992	5,038	34.88%	5,588	38.69%	3,816	26.42%
1996	5,054	38.03%	5,728	43.11%	2,506	18.86%
2000	8,197	55.85%	5,274	35.93%	1,206	8.22%
2004	9,698	57.87%	6,794	40.54%	266	1.59%
2008	9,735	58.14%	6,547	39.10%	461	2.75%
2012	10,159	60.78%	6,153	36.81%	402	2.41%
2016	12,925	73.38%	3,637	20.65%	1,052	5.97%
2020	14,821	75.78%	4,367	22.33%	370	1.89%
2024	15,666	77.12%	4,306	21.20%	341	1.68%

== Education ==
School districts include:

- Brainerd Public School District
- Foley Public School District
- Holdingford Public School District
- Little Falls Public School District
- Long Prairie-Grey Eagle School District
- Melrose Public School District
- Milaca Public School District
- Onamia Public School District
- Pierz Public School District
- Pillager Public School District
- Royalton Public School District
- Staples-Motley School District
- Swanville Public School District
- Upsala Public School District

== See also ==
- Great River Regional Library
- National Register of Historic Places listings in Morrison County, Minnesota
- Byron David Smith killings
