= List of county roads in Sherburne County, Minnesota =

- Standard county road marker

Highway names
- County State-Aid Highways: County State-Aid Highway X (CSAH X)
- County Roads: County Road X (CR X)

System links
- County roads of Minnesota; Sherburne County

The following is a list of county roads in Sherburne County, Minnesota, United States. Some of the routes included in this list are also county state-aid highways (CSAH).

== Route list ==
Number	Length (mi)	Length (km)	Southern or western terminus	Northern or eastern terminus	Local names	Formed	Removed	Notes
CSAH 1	18.240	29.354	US 10 in Elk River	County 3 in Blue Hill Township		—	—	
CSAH 2	—	—	US 169 in Baldwin Township	Isanti CR 5		—	—	
CSAH 3	—	—	US 10 in Haven Township	Mille Lacs CR 3		—	—	
CSAH 4	—	—	County 23 in Becker Township	Isanti CR 8		—	—	
CSAH 5	—	—	US 10 in Big Lake	Mille Lacs CR 7		—	—	
CSAH 6	—	—	US 10 in Clear Lake	Benton County line		—	—	
CSAH 7	—	—	US 10 in Haven Township	County 3 in Haven Township		—	—	
CSAH 8	—	—	US 10 and MN 25 in Becker	US 10 in St. Cloud		—	—	
CSAH 9	—	—	County 5 in Blue Hill Township	County 19 in Baldwin Township		—	—	
CSAH 10	—	—	County 5 in Orrock Township	County 15 in Orrock Township		—	—	
CSAH 11	—	—	MN 25 in Big Lake Township	Benton County line		—	—	
CSAH 12	—	—	Line Avenue in Elk River	Anoka CR 22		—	—	
CSAH 13	—	—	County 12 in Elk River	Norris Lake Road in Elk River		—	—	
CSAH 14	—	—	MN 25 in Big Lake Township	US 10 in Big Lake Township		—	—	
CSAH 15	—	—	US 10 in Big Lake Township	County 4 in Orrock Township		—	—	
CSAH 16	—	—	County 8 in Haven Township	County 5 in Orrock Township		—	—	
CSAH 17	—	—	MN 25 in Big Lake Township	US 10 and MN 25 in Big Lake Township		—	—	
CSAH 18	—	—	Mille Lacs County line	Isanti County line		—	—	
CSAH 19	—	—	US 169 in Livonia Township	County 2 in Baldwin Township		—	—	
CSAH 20	—	—	US 10 in Clear Lake	Benton County line		—	—	
CSAH 22	—	—	County 3 in Santiago Township	Mille Lacs County line		—	—	
CSAH 23	—	—	US 10 in Becker	Benton County line		—	—	
CSAH 24	—	—	US 10 in Becker	County 11 in Becker Township		—	—	
CSAH 25	—	—	County 1 in Livonia Township	US 169 in Livonia Township		—	—	
CSAH 28	—	—	County 19 in Baldwin Township	Isanti County line		—	—	
CSAH 29	—	—	US 169 in Princeton	Mille Lacs CR 29		—	—	
CSAH 30	—	—	County 14 in Big Lake Township	Waco Street in Elk River		—	—	
CR 30	—	—	Waco Street in Elk River	Orono Parkway in Elk River		—	—	
CR 32	—	—	County 1 in Elk River	County 1 in Livonia Township		—	—	
CSAH 33	—	—	County 1 in Elk River	Anoka County line		—	—	
CR 33	—	—	County 32 in Elk River	County 1 in Elk River		—	—	
CR 34	—	—	County 13 in Elk River	Anoka County line		—	—	
CR 35	—	—	County 15 in Big Lake Township	County 44 in Elk River		—	—	
CR 37	—	—	County 18 in Baldwin Township	Isanti County line		—	—	
CR 38	—	—	US 169 in Baldwin Township	Isanti County line		—	—	
CR 39	—	—	County 4 in Livonia Township	County 9 in Baldwin Township		—	—	
CR 40	—	—	County 12 in Elk River	County 13 in Elk River		—	—	
CR 42	—	—	County 1 in Blue Hill Township	County 45 in Baldwin Township		—	—	
CSAH 43	—	—	County 14 in Big Lake Township	US 10 in Big Lake		—	—	
CR 43	—	—	US 10 in Big Lake	County 15 in Big Lake Township		—	—	
CR 44	—	—	US 10 in Elk River	County 1 in Elk River		—	—	
CR 45	—	—	County 25 in Livonia Township	US 169 in Princeton		—	—	
CR 46	—	—	County 1 in Livonia Township	County 4 in Zimmerman		—	—	
CR 48	—	—	County 6 in Palmer Township	County 11 in Santiago Township		—	—	
CR 50	—	—	County 11 in Big Lake Township	US 10 in Big Lake Township		—	—	
CR 51	—	—	County 11 in Becker Township	County 4 in Becker Township		—	—	
CR 52	—	—	County 8 in Becker	US 10 and MN 25 in Becker		—	—	
CR 53	—	—	Dead End in Becker	County 16 in Palmer Township		—	—	
CR 54	—	—	US 10 in Clear Lake Township	County 53 in Clear Lake Township		—	—	
CR 55	—	—	Moorhouse Avenue in Clear Lake	County 6 in Palmer Township		—	—	
CR 56	—	—	US 10 in Clear Lake Township	County 53 in Clear Lake Township		—	—	Southern Segment
CR 56	—	—	County 56 in Clear Lake Township	County 54 in Clear Lake Township		—	—	Northern Segment
CR 58	—	—	County 8 in Clear Lake Township	Church Circle in Clear Lake		—	—	
CR 59	—	—	County 3 in Palmer Township	Benton County line		—	—	Western Segment
CR 59	—	—	County 59 in Santiago Township	County 23 in Santiago Township		—	—	Eastern Segment
CR 61	—	—	US 10 in Haven Township	County 3 in Palmer Township		—	—	
CR 62	—	—	Benton County line	County 6 in Palmer Township		—	—	
CR 63	—	—	County 8 in St. Cloud	US 10 in St. Cloud		—	—	
CR 65	—	—	County 8 in Haven Township	County 3 in Haven Township		—	—	
CR 66	—	—	US 10 in Haven Township	US 10 in Haven Township		—	—	
CR 67	—	—	County 24 in Becker	County 4 in Becker Township		—	—	
CR 68	—	—	County 14 in Big Lake Township	Big Lake city limit		—	—	
CR 70	—	—	Mille Lacs County line	County 3 in Blue Hill Township		—	—	
CR 72	—	—	County 35 in Big Lake Township	County 32 in Elk River		—	—	
CR 73	—	—	County 81 in Big Lake Township	County 11 in Becker Township		—	—	
CR 74	—	—	US 169 in Livonia Township	County 19 in Livonia Township		—	—	
CR 75	—	—	County 5 in Big Lake Township	County 4 in Orrock Township		—	—	
CR 76	—	—	County 8 in Clear Lake Township	State Street in Clear Lake		—	—	
CR 78	—	—	County 3 in Haven Township	County 62 in Haven Township		—	—	
CR 79	—	—	County 15 in Big Lake Township	County 32 in Elk River		—	—	
CR 80	—	—	County 5 in Blue Hill Township	County 3 in Blue Hill Township		—	—	
CR 81	—	—	US 10 in Big Lake Township	County 73 in Big Lake Township		—	—	
CR 83	—	—	County 43 in Big Lake Township	County 15 in Big Lake Township		—	—	
CR 85	—	—	County 16 in Santiago Township	County 11 in Santiago Township		—	—	
CR 86	—	—	County 23 in Santiago Township	County 11 in Santiago Township		—	—	
CR 87	—	—	County 1 in Baldwin Township	County 45 in Baldwin Township		—	—	
CR 91	—	—	County 8 in Clear Lake Township	County 8 in Haven Township		—	—	
CR 93	—	—	County 4 in Becker Township	County 16 in Becker Township		—	—	
CR 121	—	—	County 33 in Elk River	Jarvis Street in Elk River		—	—	
CR 127	—	—	County 23 in Becker Township	County 16 in Santiago Township		—	—	
