= Orrock, Minnesota =

Orrock
- Unincorporated community
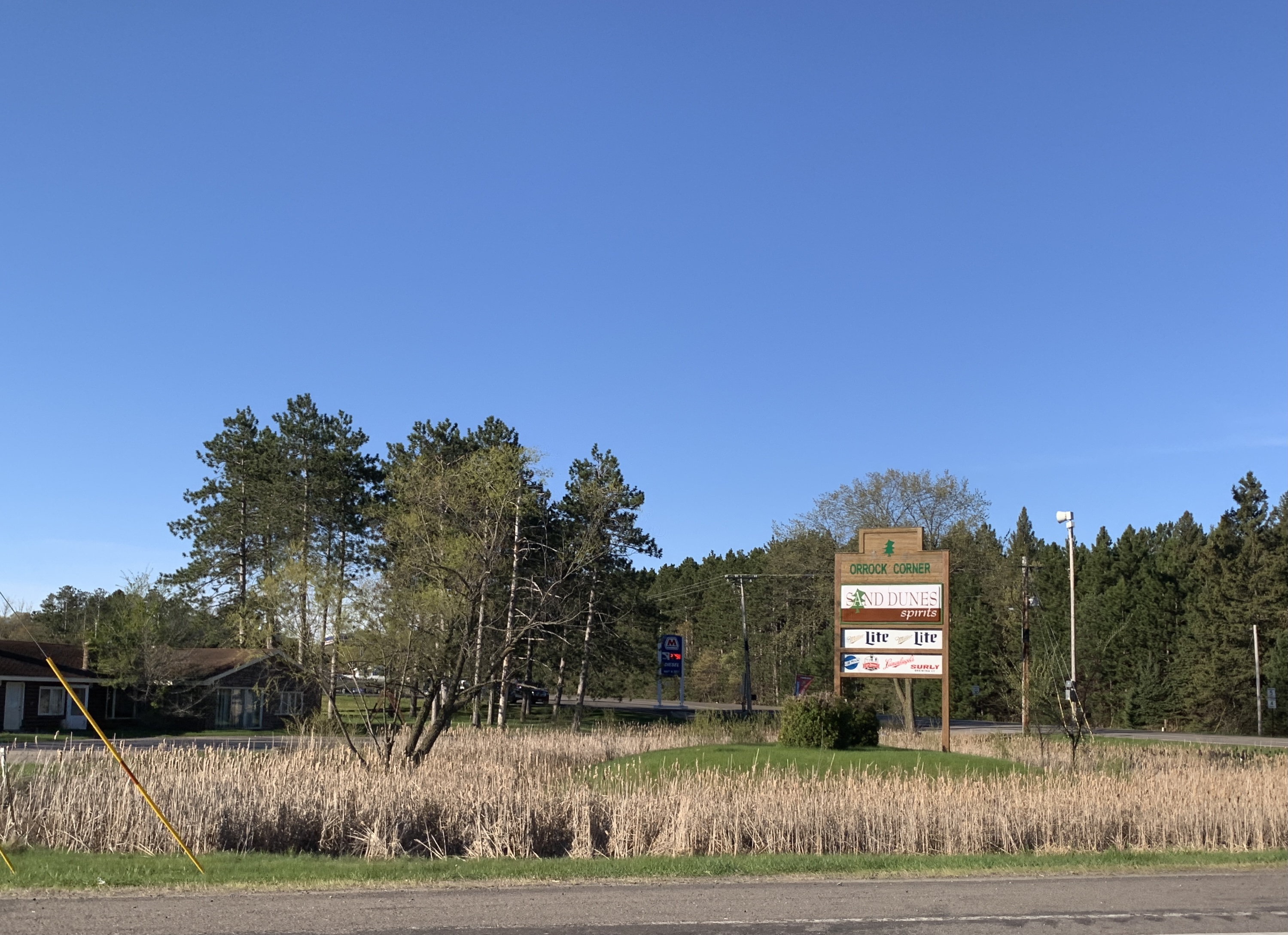

- Location within Minnesota Location within the United States
- Coordinates: 45°26′38″N 93°44′11″W
- Country: United States
- State: Minnesota
- County: Sherburne
- Township: Orrock Township
- Elevation: 988 ft (301 m)
- Time zone: UTC-6 (Central (CST))
  - Summer (DST): UTC-5 (CDT)
- ZIP code: 55309
- Area code: 763
- GNIS feature ID: 654861

Orrock is an unincorporated community in Orrock Township, Sherburne County, Minnesota, United States.

== Geography ==
The community is near the junction of Sherburne County Road 5 (184th Street NW) and Sherburne County Road 4. County Roads 1, 15, 16, and 75 are also in the immediate area.

Nearby towns include Big Lake, Becker, Santiago, Zimmerman, Salida, Bailey, and Elk River. The Sherburne National Wildlife Refuge and the Sand Dunes State Forest are both in the surrounding area.
