= Herbert M. Fox House =

Historic house in Minnesota, United States

- U.S. National Register of Historic Places
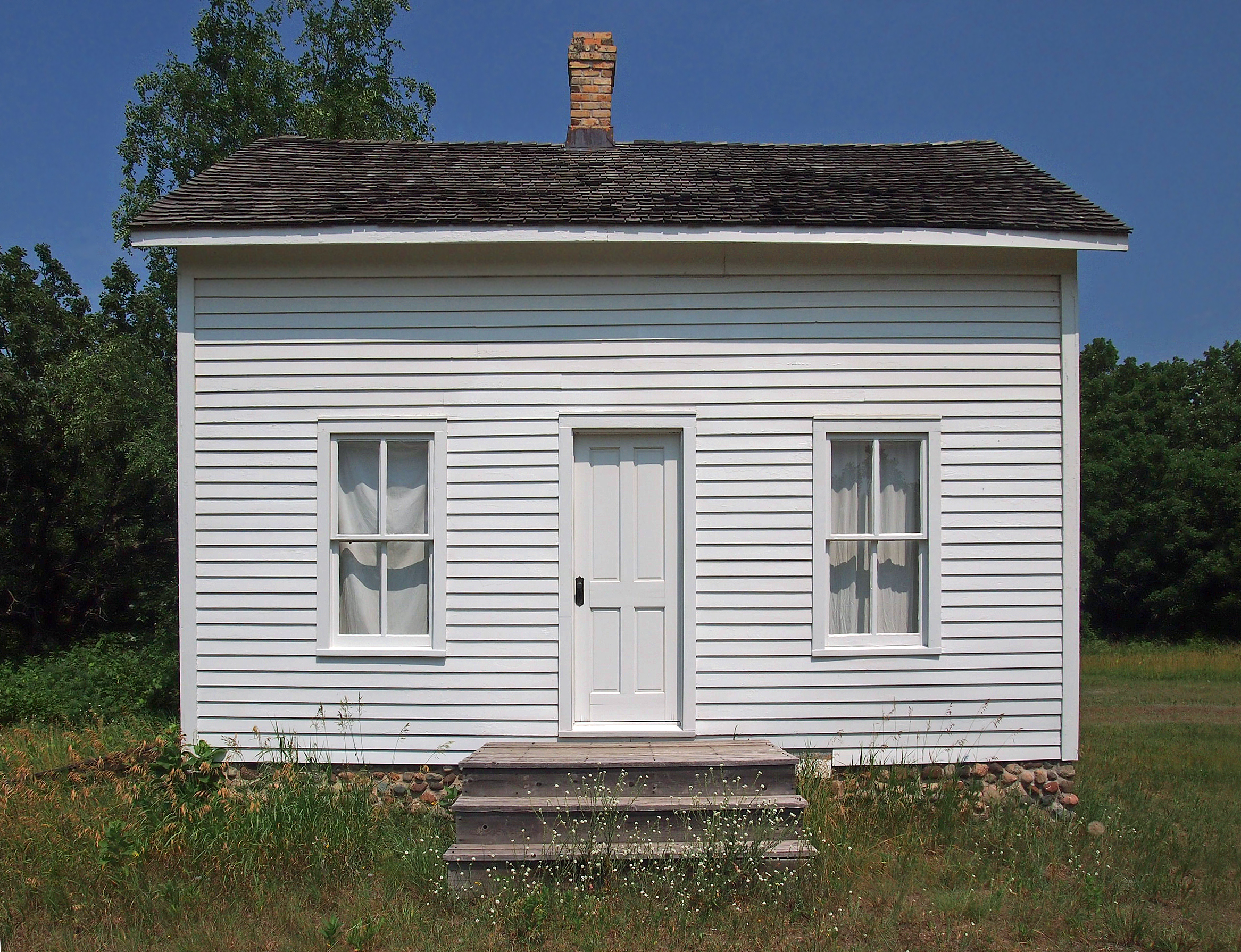
- The Herbert M. Fox House on the grounds of the Sherburne History Center

- Location within Minnesota Location within the United States
- Location: 10775 27th Avenue SE, Becker, Minnesota
- Coordinates: 45°24′56.2″N 93°53′21.4″W
- Area: 1 acre (0.40 ha)
- Built: 1876
- Architect: Ole Martinsen or Samuel P. Glidden
- NRHP reference No.: 80002175
- Added to NRHP: April 10, 1980

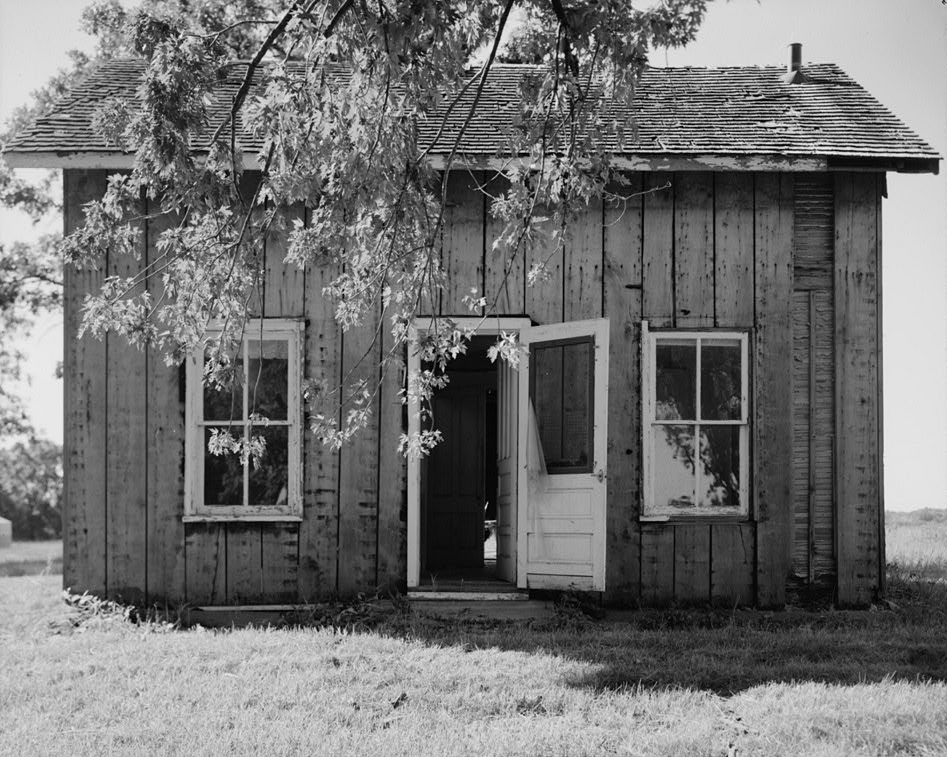
The Fox House in 1981 with the structural planks exposed

The Herbert M. Fox House is a pioneer farmhouse in Becker, Minnesota, United States. It was built in 1876 with an unusual construction method using load-bearing vertical planks rather than wall studs. It originally stood in Santiago Township, was moved to Becker in 1981, and moved again in 2006 to the grounds of the Sherburne History Center. It was listed on the National Register of Historic Places in 1980 for its local significance in the themes of architecture and exploration/settlement. It was nominated for being an example of early pioneer architecture in Minnesota, representing the houses of mid-19th-century subsistence farmers while displaying a rare vernacular construction method.

== Description ==
The Herbert M. Fox House is a 1 1/2-story wooden building with a gable roof. It is small, with a footprint of 21 feet 4 inches (6.50 m) by 16 feet 3 inches (4.95 m). The walls are built of 14-inch-wide (36 cm), 2-inch-thick (5.1 cm) oak planks nailed directly to the first- and second-floor sills. There is no internal framing with wall studs or other support posts. The walls are simply nailed together at the four corners. Horizontal clapboard is nailed directly to the planks on the exterior, while the interior is lathed and plastered.

The house has two doors, centered on the north and south elevations, and two windows on each of the four walls. The roof is shingled and a chimney rises through the center of the house. The building originally had a full cellar accessible through the pantry and an exterior hatch. The original internal configuration probably consisted of three rooms on the ground floor and two sleeping areas on the second floor. By 1979, when the National Register documentation was prepared, the first floor had been modified to contain a bedroom, pantry, bathroom, and kitchen.

== Origins ==
The house was originally constructed near the St. Francis River in Santiago Township. From June 30, 1876, to fall of that same year, the plot passed quickly through its first three Euro-American owners: Ole Martinsen, Samuel P. Glidden, and Herbert and Eleanor Fox. Either of the first two must have constructed the house, as the Foxes' grandson Bill Fox recalled his grandfather mentioning it was already built when he acquired the farmstead. The planks were cut at a sawmill powered by the St. Francis River in nearby Santiago.

Herbert M. Fox was born in 1849 in England, emigrated to Canada at age 16, then to Sherburne County, Minnesota, around 1868. After ten years he had saved up enough money to buy the 160-acre (65 ha) farmstead with this house. He married Eleanor Biggerstaff in 1879 and they had a son, John, two years later. In addition to the fields north and west of the house, the farm contained a barn, root cellar, milk cellar, windmill, and an orchard of Duchess apple trees, a plum tree, and eight sugar maple trees. Herbert Fox served as an enumerator for the 1880 U.S. Census and as Santiago Township's tax assessor in the 1880s and 1890s. John Fox married Nellie Bartholomew in 1917 and she moved into this home with her husband and his parents. Eleanor Fox died in 1923 and Herbert Fox in 1940, at the age of 91.

The farm had grown to 557 acres (225 ha) in 1961, when John Fox died and ownership passed to his and Nellie's sons William (Bill) and Irvin. In 1965 the property was among the 30,700 acres (124 km^{2}) selected to become Sherburne National Wildlife Refuge, and the Foxes were obliged to sell the land to the federal government. A crew from the U.S. Fish and Wildlife Service began demolishing the Fox House, but immediately recognized its unusual construction and halted work for a historical assessment. State officials agreed the house was architecturally significant, and the Fox House was conserved in place. It was listed on the National Register of Historic Places in 1980.

== Relocation ==
In 1981, the construction of a new impoundment pond at Sherburne National Wildlife Refuge was going to isolate the Fox House, complicating its options for adaptive reuse. Federal, state, and local officials worked to move the house 20 miles (32 km) next to the Sherburne County Historical Society in Becker. Initially on the city's outskirts, the site became subsumed by urban growth by the end of the 20th century, robbing it of its proper rural setting and constraining the historical society's interpretation efforts. In 2006 the Fox House was moved a second time, to the expansive grounds of the relocated Sherburne History Center north of Becker.

== See also ==
- National Register of Historic Places listings in Sherburne County, Minnesota
