= Briggs Lake, Minnesota =

Briggs Lake
- Unincorporated community
- Location within Minnesota Location within the United States
- Coordinates: 45°30′31″N 93°56′10″W
- Country: United States
- State: Minnesota
- County: Sherburne
- Township: Palmer Township
- Elevation: 991 ft (302 m)
- Time zone: UTC-6 (Central (CST))
  - Summer (DST): UTC-5 (CDT)
- ZIP code: 55319
- Area code: 320
- GNIS feature ID: 640480

Briggs Lake is an unincorporated community in Palmer Township, Sherburne County, Minnesota, United States, near Clear Lake.
