= Santiago, Minnesota =

Santiago
- Unincorporated community
- Location within Minnesota Location within the United States
- Coordinates: 45°32′21″N 93°49′12″W
- Country: United States
- State: Minnesota
- County: Sherburne
- Township: Santiago Township
- Elevation: 1,014 ft (309 m)
- Time zone: UTC-6 (Central (CST))
  - Summer (DST): UTC-5 (CDT)
- ZIP code: 55377, 55371, and 55319
- Area code: 763
- GNIS feature ID: 651206

Santiago is an unincorporated community in Santiago Township, Sherburne County, Minnesota, United States, near the junction of Sherburne County Roads 3 and 11. The St. Francis River flows through the community.

== Geography ==
Sherburne County Roads 16 and 23 are also in the immediate area, as is the Sherburne National Wildlife Refuge.

Nearby towns include Clear Lake, Foley, Princeton, and St. Cloud. Santiago is 12 miles north of Becker, and 26 miles north-northwest of Elk River.

=== Climate ===
Climate data for Santiago, Minnesota (1991–2020 normals, extremes 1961–present)
Month	Jan	Feb	Mar	Apr	May	Jun	Jul	Aug	Sep	Oct	Nov	Dec	Year
Record high °F (°C)	55 (13)	61 (16)	80 (27)	96 (36)	95 (35)	104 (40)	105 (41)	101 (38)	97 (36)	90 (32)	75 (24)	62 (17)	105 (41)
Mean daily maximum °F (°C)	22.1 (−5.5)	27.4 (−2.6)	40.2 (4.6)	55.6 (13.1)	68.8 (20.4)	76.9 (24.9)	80.9 (27.2)	79.1 (26.2)	71.6 (22.0)	57.2 (14.0)	40.1 (4.5)	26.7 (−2.9)	53.9 (12.2)
Daily mean °F (°C)	13.0 (−10.6)	17.7 (−7.9)	30.4 (−0.9)	44.3 (6.8)	57.1 (13.9)	65.9 (18.8)	70.0 (21.1)	67.9 (19.9)	60.2 (15.7)	46.7 (8.2)	31.9 (−0.1)	18.9 (−7.3)	43.7 (6.5)
Mean daily minimum °F (°C)	3.8 (−15.7)	7.9 (−13.4)	20.7 (−6.3)	33.0 (0.6)	45.4 (7.4)	54.9 (12.7)	59.1 (15.1)	56.6 (13.7)	48.7 (9.3)	36.2 (2.3)	23.6 (−4.7)	11.0 (−11.7)	33.4 (0.8)
Record low °F (°C)	−41 (−41)	−39 (−39)	−34 (−37)	−2 (−19)	16 (−9)	30 (−1)	37 (3)	34 (1)	18 (−8)	5 (−15)	−24 (−31)	−41 (−41)	−41 (−41)
Average precipitation inches (mm)	0.77 (20)	0.90 (23)	1.72 (44)	2.83 (72)	3.90 (99)	4.23 (107)	3.99 (101)	4.06 (103)	2.90 (74)	2.72 (69)	1.56 (40)	1.11 (28)	30.69 (780)
Average snowfall inches (cm)	9.8 (25)	9.5 (24)	8.7 (22)	3.5 (8.9)	0.1 (0.25)	0.0 (0.0)	0.0 (0.0)	0.0 (0.0)	0.0 (0.0)	0.8 (2.0)	6.5 (17)	10.5 (27)	49.4 (125)
Average precipitation days (≥ 0.01 in)	5.1	4.4	6.4	8.8	10.3	10.4	9.1	8.6	8.2	7.9	5.6	6.2	91.0
Average snowy days (≥ 0.1 in)	4.9	3.8	3.1	1.4	0.1	0.0	0.0	0.0	0.0	0.4	3.0	5.7	22.4
Source: NOAA

== History ==
Santiago was platted in 1857. A post office called Santiago operated between 1858 and 1985. It is called Santiago in honour to Santiago El Mayor, Saint Patron of Spain, the first europeans that lived in this place.
