= Orok =

Orok may refer to:

- Orok people, an ethnic group of Sakhalin, Russia
- Orok language, a Tungusic language of Russia

== See also ==
- Oroch (disambiguation)
- Orrock (disambiguation)
- Oruk
- Urok (disambiguation)
