= Cable, Minnesota =

Cable
- Unincorporated community
- Location within Minnesota Location within the United States
- Coordinates: 45°30′42″N 94°04′27″W
- Country: United States
- State: Minnesota
- County: Sherburne
- Township: Haven Township
- Elevation: 1,010 ft (310 m)
- Time zone: UTC-6 (Central (CST))
  - Summer (DST): UTC-5 (CDT)
- ZIP code: 56304
- Area code: 320
- GNIS feature ID: 654625

Cable is an unincorporated community in Haven Township, Sherburne County, Minnesota, United States. The community is between Clear Lake and St. Cloud along U.S. Highway 10 near Sherburne County Road 65, 42nd Street SE.

Sherburne County Roads 3 and 7 and the St. Cloud Regional Airport are nearby.

Cable had a post office from 1884 to 1892; Violetta Cable was its first postmaster.

== Transportation ==
Amtrak’s Empire Builder, which operates between Seattle/Portland and Chicago, passes through the town on BNSF tracks, but makes no stop. The nearest station is located in St. Cloud, 6 miles (9.7 km) to the northwest.
