= Orrock =

Orrock may refer to:

== Places ==
- Orrock, Minnesota
- Orrick, Missouri
- Orrock Township, Sherburne County, Minnesota
- Orrick Township, Ray County, Missouri

== People ==
- Bobby Orrock, American politician
- Bryan Orrock, Australian rugby player
- James Orrock, Scottish art collector
- Nan Grogan Orrock, American politician
- Robert Orrock, Scottish footbal player
- Roy Orrock, British airman
