= Highway 24 Bridge =

- Coordinates: 45°25′04″N 94°02′37″W
- Carries: Two lanes of MN 24
- Crosses: Mississippi River
- Locale: Clearwater, Minnesota
- Maintained by: Minnesota Department of Transportation
- ID number: 6557

Characteristics
- Design: Steel girder bridge
- Total length: 1144 feet
- Width: 38 feet
- Longest span: 148 feet
- Clearance below: 42 feet

History
- Opened: 1958

The old Minnesota Highway 24 Bridge was a steel girder bridge that spanned the Mississippi River between Clearwater, Minnesota and the east bank near Clear Lake, Minnesota. It was designed and built in 1958 by the Minnesota Department of Transportation, opening in 1960 and closing in 2017 when the new Hwy. 24 bridge opened.

The new Hwy. 24 bridge is 1,235 ft. long, made up of more than 5,000 yards of concrete and 517,000 tons of steel.

The new bridge is the third on the site after a swing-cable ferry operated from 1856 to 1930 and 1944 to 1960. A repurposed bridge was installed in 1930 but washed away in 1943 and the ferry was back in operation from 1944 to 1960.

The Highway 24 bridge crosses a river road and three spans of floodplain before actually crossing the Mississippi.

== New proposed freeway ==
The two-lane highway 24 serves as a major route for weekend recreational traffic transferring between Interstate 94 and U.S. Highway 10. As such it is badly over capacity and congestion is predicted to worsen on weekdays as the area becomes developed. To relieve congestion, a new freeway connection has been proposed that would cross the river several miles to the east. A MN DOT study was completed in 2007 but as of January 2022 no construction is scheduled.

It is not known if the new crossing will carry the MN 24 designation or a different number, as the present highway between Clear Lake and Clearwater would undoubtedly be transferred to local jurisdiction.

== See also ==
- List of crossings of the Upper Mississippi River
