= Senator Sherburne =

Senator Sherburne may refer to:

- John C. Sherburne (1883–1959), Vermont State Senate
- Moses Sherburne (1808–1868), Maine State Senate
