= Urok =

Urok may refer to:

- Urok (film), or The Lesson, a 2014 Bulgarian film
- Urok, a neighborhood in Szczecin, West Pomeranian Voivodeship, Poland

== See also ==
- Uruk (disambiguation)
- Orok (disambiguation)
- Oruk
- Yurok (disambiguation)
