= Uruk (disambiguation) =

Uruk was a city in ancient Sumer.

Uruk may also refer to:

- Uruk period, the archaeological culture or time period
- Uruk-hai, the fictional creatures from J. R. R. Tolkien's writings
- Uruk Sulcus, terrain on Ganymede
- Uruk GNU/Linux, Linux distribution based on Linux-libre
- Uruk, the single star of the Uruk exoplanetary system

== See also ==
- Erech (disambiguation)
- Oruk
- Urok (disambiguation)
