= Salida, Minnesota =

Salida
- Unincorporated community
- Location within Minnesota Location within the United States
- Coordinates: 45°21′24″N 93°49′10″W
- Country: United States
- State: Minnesota
- County: Sherburne
- Township: Becker Township
- Elevation: 955 ft (291 m)
- Time zone: UTC-6 (Central (CST))
  - Summer (DST): UTC-5 (CDT)
- ZIP code: 55308
- Area code: 763
- GNIS feature ID: 654931

Salida is an unincorporated community in Becker Township, Sherburne County, Minnesota, United States. The community is near the junction of U.S. Highway 10 and Sherburne County Road 11. Nearby towns include Becker and Big Lake.

== Transportation ==
Amtrak’s Empire Builder, which operates between Seattle/Portland and Chicago, passes through the town on BNSF tracks, but makes no stop. The nearest station is located in St. Cloud, 23 miles (37 km) to the northwest.
