= Bailey, Minnesota =

Bailey
- Unincorporated community
- Location within Minnesota Location within the United States
- Coordinates: 45°19′01″N 93°39′55″W
- Country: United States
- State: Minnesota
- County: Sherburne
- Township: Big Lake Township
- Elevation: 925 ft (282 m)
- Time zone: UTC-6 (Central (CST))
  - Summer (DST): UTC-5 (CDT)
- ZIP code: 55309
- Area code: 763
- GNIS feature ID: 654580

Bailey is an unincorporated community in Big Lake Township, Sherburne County, Minnesota, United States. The community is located between Big Lake and Elk River near the junction of Sherburne County Roads 14 and 15, and U.S. Highway 10.

The community was named for Orlando Bailey, an early settler.

== Transportation ==
Amtrak’s Empire Builder, which operates between Seattle/Portland and Chicago, passes through the town on BNSF tracks, but makes no stop. The nearest station is located in St. Cloud, 32 miles (51 km) to the northwest.
