= Livonia Township, Sherburne County, Minnesota =

Livonia Township, Minnesota
- Township
- Location within the state of Minnesota Livonia Township, Minnesota (the United States)
- Coordinates: 45°25′58″N 93°34′38″W
- Country: United States
- State: Minnesota
- County: Sherburne

Area
  - Total: 32.8 sq mi (84.9 km^{2})
  - Land: 31.9 sq mi (82.5 km^{2})
  - Water: 0.93 sq mi (2.4 km^{2})
- Elevation: 958 ft (292 m)

Population (2026)
  - Total: 6,479
  - Density: 212.0/sq mi (81.85/km^{2})
- Time zone: UTC-6 (Central (CST))
  - Summer (DST): UTC-5 (CDT)
- FIPS code: 27-37754
- GNIS feature ID: 0664808

Livonia Township is a township in Sherburne County, Minnesota, United States. The population was 6,479 as of 2026.

Livonia Township was organized in 1866.

== Geography ==
According to the United States Census Bureau, the township has a total area of 32.8 square miles (84.9 km^{2}), of which 31.8 square miles (82.5 km^{2}) is land and 0.9 square mile (2.4 km^{2}) (2.84%) is water. It is primarily featured in Zimmerman.

== Demographics ==
As of the census of 2000, there were 3,917 people, 1,222 households, and 1,050 families residing in the township. The population density was 123.0 inhabitants per square mile (47.5/km^{2}). There were 1,241 housing units at an average density of 39.0 per square mile (15.1/km^{2}). The racial makeup of the township was 98.29% White, 0.15% African American, 0.31% Native American, 0.49% Asian, 0.26% from other races, and 0.51% from two or more races. Hispanic or Latino of any race were 0.59% of the population.

There were 1,222 households, out of which 52.3% had children under the age of 18 living with them, 78.2% were married couples living together, 4.3% had a female householder with no husband present, and 14.0% were non-families. 9.8% of all households were made up of individuals, and 2.1% had someone living alone who was 65 years of age or older. The average household size was 3.20 and the average family size was 3.43.

In the township the population was spread out, with 34.3% under the age of 18, 6.5% from 18 to 24, 37.2% from 25 to 44, 17.9% from 45 to 64, and 4.1% who were 65 years of age or older. The median age was 33 years. For every 100 females, there were 106.0 males. For every 100 females age 18 and over, there were 107.8 males.

The median income for a household in the township was $63,381, and the median income for a family was $66,458. Males had a median income of $47,353 versus $28,052 for females. The per capita income for the township was $22,902. About 1.5% of families and 1.8% of the population were below the poverty line, including 2.3% of those under age 18 and 7.2% of those age 65 or over.
