= Minnesota State Highway 24 =

State highway in Minnesota, United States

Trunk Highway 24
- MN 24 highlighted in red

Route information
- Maintained by MnDOT
- Length: 47.832 mi (76.978 km)
- Existed: 1920–present

Major junctions
- South end: US 12 / MN 22 in Litchfield
- I-94 / US 52 in Clearwater
- North end: US 10 in Clear Lake

Location
- Country: United States
- State: Minnesota
- Counties: Meeker, Stearns, Wright, Sherburne

Highway system
- Minnesota Trunk Highway System; Interstate; US; State; Legislative; Scenic
← MN 23	→ MN 25

Minnesota State Highway 24 (MN 24) is a 47.832-mile-long (76.978 km) highway in central Minnesota, which travels from its intersection with U.S. Highway 12 (US 12) and MN 22 in Litchfield and continues northeast to its intersection with US 10 and Sherburne County Road 6 in Clear Lake.

For part of its route (5 miles (8.0 km)), MN 24 travels concurrent with MN 15 between Kingston Township and Kimball.

MN 24 also travels concurrently with MN 55 for 9 miles (14 km) between Kimball and Annandale.

The section between Interstate 94 (I-94)/US 52 and US 10 is part of the National Highway System.

== Route description ==
MN 24 serves as a northeast–southwest route in central Minnesota between Litchfield, Kimball, Annandale, Clearwater, and Clear Lake.

The route crosses the Highway 24 Bridge at the Mississippi River between Clearwater and Clear Lake.

The section of MN 24 between I-94 and US 10 experiences high volumes of traffic due to its usage as a connection between the two highways. This connection primarily serves Twin Cities traffic heading to and from communities in central Minnesota and the Brainerd Lakes Area via US 10, especially on summer weekends. As a result of the rising traffic volumes experienced on this stretch of MN 24, a new freeway has been proposed to connect I-94 and US 10 in the vicinity, but is not expected to begin construction until after 2028.

== History ==
Highway 24 was authorized November 2, 1920 from Litchfield to St. Cloud. The roadway was fully graveled by 1927.

In 1934, State Highway 15 was extended to St. Cloud, replacing Highway 24 north of Kingston Township and assuming most of its former extent.

Highway 24 was paved from 1947 through 1949.

Trunk Highway 240
- Location: Annandale to Clear Lake
- Length: 17.1 mi (27.5 km)
- Existed: 1949–1961

In 1961, Highway 24 was extended along what was previously State Highway 240 from Annandale across the Mississippi River to Clear Lake, overlapping with Highways 15 and 55 to connect to its original extent.

Highway 240 had been established July 1, 1949, and was fully paved by that time. The route number was replaced in its entirety by Highway 24.

== Major intersections ==
County	Location	mi	km	Destinations	Notes
Meeker	Litchfield Township	0.000	0.000	US 12 / MN 22 – Willmar	Southern terminus
Meeker	Kingston Township	15.609	25.120	MN 15 south – Dassel	Southern end of MN 15 overlap
Stearns	Kimball	21.109	33.972	MN 15 north / MN 55 west – St. Cloud, Eden Valley	Northern end of MN 15 overlap; western end of MN 55 overlap
Wright	Annandale	30.754	49.494	MN 55 east – Buffalo	Eastern end of MN 55 overlap
Wright	Clearwater	43.944– 43.999	70.721– 70.810	I-94 – Minneapolis, St. Paul, St. Cloud	Interchange; I-94 Exit 178
Mississippi River		44.653– 44.869	71.862– 72.210	Highway 24 Bridge	
Sherburne	Clear Lake	47.831– 47.844	76.977– 76.997	US 10 / CSAH 6 – Elk River, St. Cloud	
1.000 mi = 1.609 km; 1.000 km = 0.621 mi: Concurrency terminus
