= Moses Sherburne =

American politician and jurist

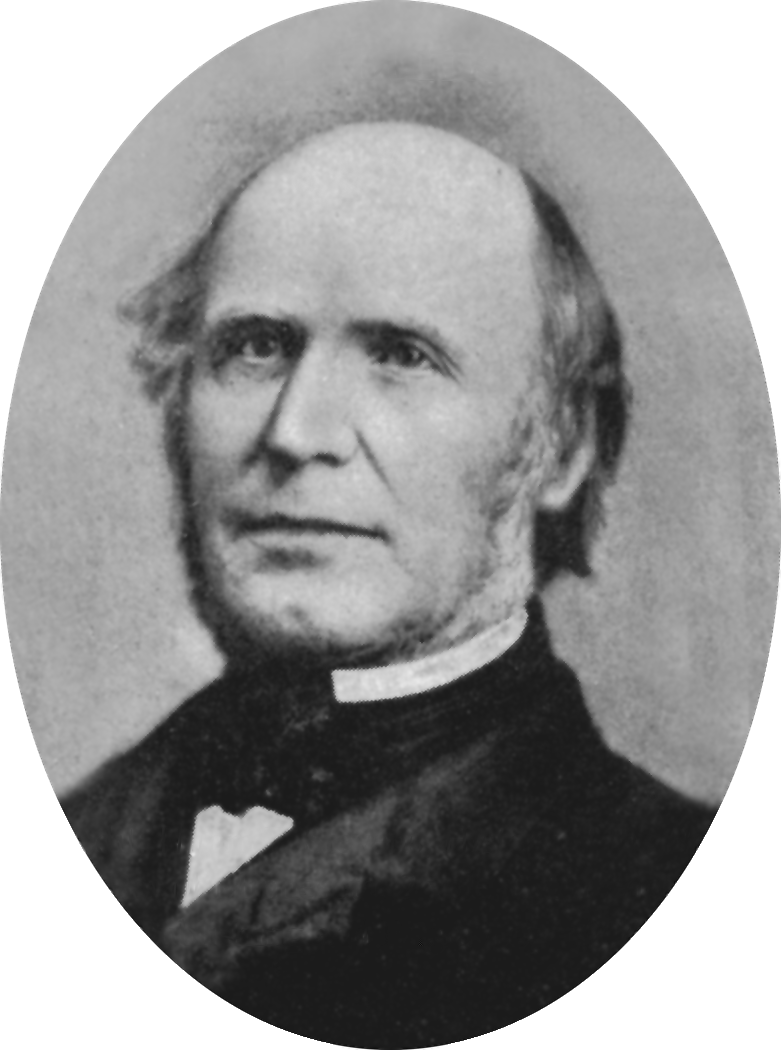
Moses G. Sherburne

Moses G. Sherburne (January 25, 1808 – March 23, 1868) was an American politician and jurist.

Born in Mount Vernon, Kennebec County, Maine, Sherburne studied at the academy in China, Maine. He then studied law and was admitted to the Maine bar in 1831. He practiced law in Phillips, Maine, where he served as postmaster and in the Maine Legislature, and later lived in Franklin County, Maine. Sherburne served in the Maine House of Representatives, in 1842, and then in the Maine State Senate, in 1845, as a Democrat. Sherburne also served as justice of the peace and then as probate judge for Franklin County, Maine. He was also major general for the Maine militia. In 1850, Sherburne served as Maine Bank Commissioner. He then ran for the United States House of Representatives as a Democrat in 1852. In 1853, President Franklin Pierce appointed Sherburne to the Minnesota Territorial Supreme Court. Sherburne served until 1857. Sherburne served in the Minnesota Constitutional Convention of 1857. Sherburne continued to practice law in Minnesota and was in the real estate business. Sherburne died at his home in Saint Paul, Minnesota. Sherburne County, Minnesota was named after him.
