= St. Francis River (Minnesota) =

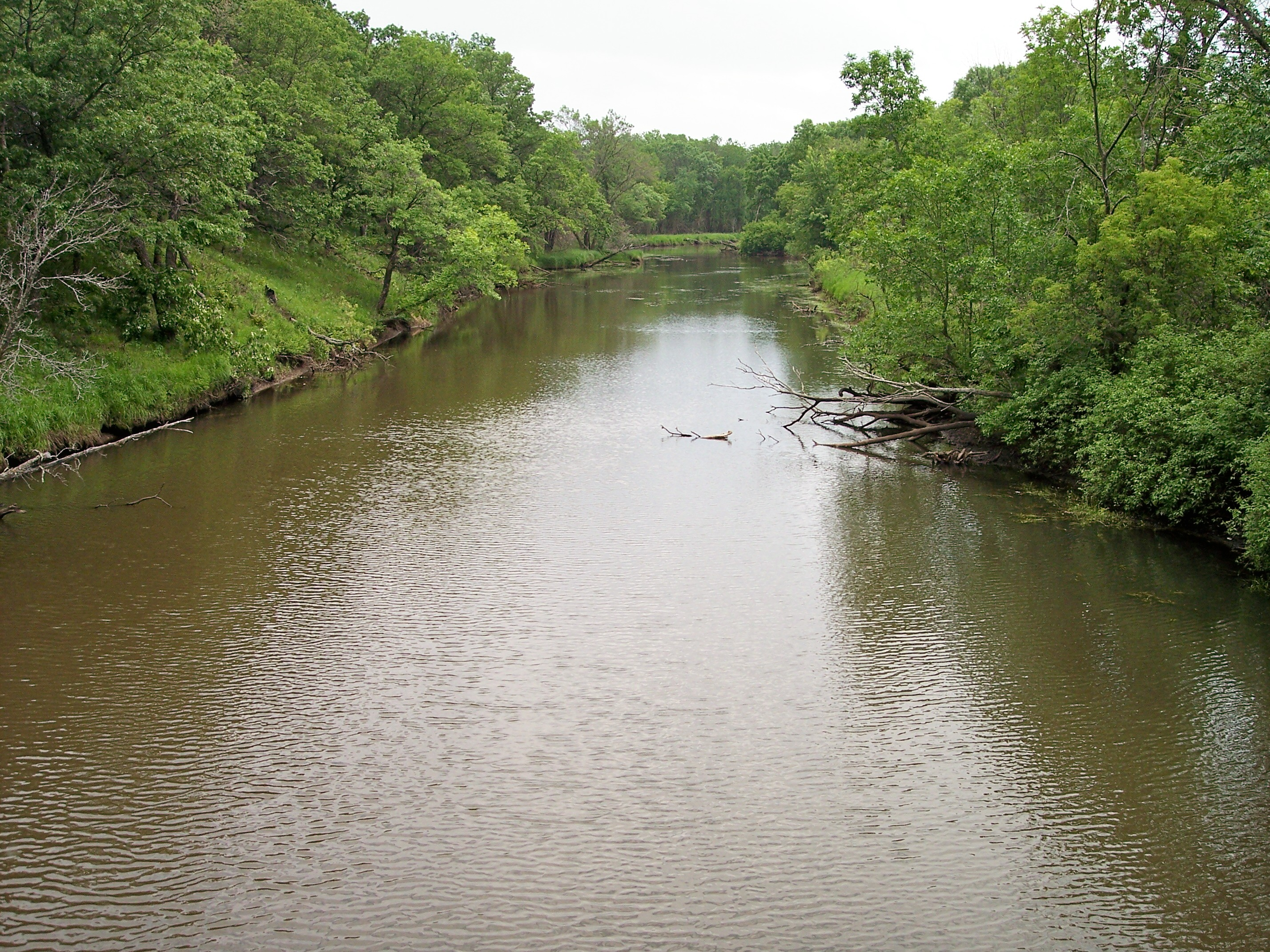
- The St. Francis River in the Sherburne National Wildlife Refuge in 2007

- Location of mouth

Location
- Country: United States
- State: Minnesota

Physical characteristics
- Source
  - location: Alberta Township, Benton County
  - coordinates: 45°48′29″N 93°53′31″W
  - elevation: 1,247 ft (380 m)
- Mouth: Elk River
  - location: Big Lake Township, Sherburne County
  - coordinates: 45°21′33″N 93°44′14″W
  - elevation: 912 ft (278 m)
- Length: 79 mi (127 km)
- Discharge
  - location: Big Lake, MN
  - average: 108 cu/ft. per sec.

The Saint Francis River (Dakota: Wičhá Niwáŋ) is a 79.0-mile-long (127.1 km) tributary of the Elk River in east-central Minnesota in the United States. Via the Elk River, it is part of the watershed of the Mississippi River, draining an area historically characterized by mixed hardwood and coniferous forests on flat to rolling till plains.

The St. Francis River rises in Alberta Township in northeastern Benton County, and flows generally southwardly through eastern Benton County, passing to the east of Foley and collecting a minor tributary known as the West Branch St. Francis River. The river turns eastward in northern Sherburne County, and flows south- and southwestwardly through the Sherburne National Wildlife Refuge and Sand Dunes State Forest. It joins the Elk River in Big Lake Township in southern Sherburne County, approximately one mile (2 km) north of the city of Big Lake. Canoeing is possible on some stretches of the river during periods of high water.

== History and preservation ==
Humans have lived in the St. Francis River valley for over 10,000 years; Native American village sites in the Sherburne National Wildlife Refuge date back to 1300 A.D. More recently the area was settled in the 1870s under the Homestead Act.

Historically, the St. Francis River basin was known as one of the finest wildlife areas in the state, with large numbers of ducks, muskrats, beavers and mink supported by small lakes and marshes near the river which were abundant with wild rice and other wetland plants. The surrounding upland was primarily oak savanna which provided habitat for elk, bison, and gray wolves. By the mid-twentieth century, several developments had severely reduced the value of wildlife habitat in the basin. Wetlands were drained by a ditch system, built in the 1920s to increase agricultural area. In the early 1940s lakes and streams in the basin were invaded by carp, the feeding activities of which resulted in the uprooting of submerged vegetation important to aquatic wildlife. In addition, the native oak savanna upland habitat was converted to agriculture or home sites through logging and plowing. Protection from fire allowed the oak savanna to convert to dense woodlands. The Sherburne National Wildlife Refuge was established in 1965 as an attempt to restore the native wildlife habitat of the St. Francis River's watershed, with land purchased using duck stamp funds.

== See also ==
- List of rivers of Minnesota
