= Erech (disambiguation) =

Erech can refer to:

- Erech the biblical city
- Erech (Middle-earth) - the fictional location from J. R. R. Tolkien's writings
