= Oroch =

Oroch (or alternatively Orochon) could refer to:

- Oroch language
- Oroch people
- Renault Duster Oroch, French compact pickup truck
