= Blue Hill Township, Sherburne County, Minnesota =

Blue Hill Township, Minnesota
- Township
- Location within the state of Minnesota Blue Hill Township, Minnesota (the United States)
- Coordinates: 45°30′46″N 93°41′21″W
- Country: United States
- State: Minnesota
- County: Sherburne

Area
  - Total: 36.4 sq mi (94.3 km^{2})
  - Land: 35.7 sq mi (92.5 km^{2})
  - Water: 0.69 sq mi (1.8 km^{2})
- Elevation: 981 ft (299 m)

Population (2000)
  - Total: 762
  - Density: 21/sq mi (8.2/km^{2})
- Time zone: UTC-6 (Central (CST))
  - Summer (DST): UTC-5 (CDT)
- FIPS code: 27-06742
- GNIS feature ID: 0663626
- Website: https://bluehilltownshipmn.gov/

Blue Hill Township is a township in Sherburne County, Minnesota, United States. The population was 762 at the 2000 census.

Blue Hill Township was organized in 1877, and named after a feature called Blue Mound.

== Geography ==
According to the United States Census Bureau, the township has a total area of 36.4 square miles (94 km^{2}), of which 35.7 square miles (92 km^{2}) is land and 0.7 square miles (1.8 km^{2}) (1.89%) is water.

== Demographics ==
As of the census of 2000, there were 762 people, 257 households, and 199 families residing in the township. The population density was 21.3 inhabitants per square mile (8.2/km^{2}). There were 267 housing units at an average density of 7.5 per square mile (2.9/km^{2}). The racial makeup of the township was 98.03% White, 0.39% African American, 1.05% Native American, and 0.52% from two or more races. Hispanic or Latino of any race were 0.26% of the population.

There were 257 households, out of which 45.9% had children under the age of 18 living with them, 66.1% were married couples living together, 6.2% had a female householder with no husband present, and 22.2% were non-families. 15.6% of all households were made up of individuals, and 2.3% had someone living alone who was 65 years of age or older. The average household size was 2.96 and the average family size was 3.32.

In the township the population was spread out, with 32.7% under the age of 18, 8.1% from 18 to 24, 34.9% from 25 to 44, 20.7% from 45 to 64, and 3.5% who were 65 years of age or older. The median age was 31 years. For every 100 females, there were 105.9 males. For every 100 females age 18 and over, there were 115.5 males.

The median income for a household in the township was $57,321, and the median income for a family was $65,000. Males had a median income of $37,188 versus $27,813 for females. The per capita income for the township was $19,609. About 2.1% of families and 3.7% of the population were below the poverty line, including 3.1% of those under age 18 and none of those age 65 or over.
