= Yurok (disambiguation) =

The Yurok are a Native American people of California.

Yurok may also refer to:

- Yurok language, the Algic language of the Yurok tribe
- Yurok Indian Reservation, in Del Norte and Humboldt counties, California
- Yurok, or Yörüks, a Turkic ethnic group of Turkey and the Balkan Peninsula
- USS Yurok, later the USS Bluebird, a tugboat converted into a submarine rescue vehicle

== See also ==
- Yuroke, Victoria, a rural town in Australia
