= Clear Lake Township, Sherburne County, Minnesota =

Clear Lake Township, Minnesota
- Township
- Location within the state of Minnesota Clear Lake Township, Minnesota (the United States)
- Coordinates: 45°26′29″N 93°59′15″W
- Country: United States
- State: Minnesota
- County: Sherburne

Area
  - Total: 37.1 sq mi (96.1 km^{2})
  - Land: 33.7 sq mi (87.2 km^{2})
  - Water: 3.4 sq mi (8.9 km^{2})
- Elevation: 968 ft (295 m)

Population (2000)
  - Total: 1,630
  - Density: 48/sq mi (18.7/km^{2})
- Time zone: UTC-6 (Central (CST))
  - Summer (DST): UTC-5 (CDT)
- ZIP code: 55319
- Area code: 320
- FIPS code: 27-11782
- GNIS feature ID: 0663816
- Website: https://clearlaketownship.org/

Clear Lake Township is a township in Sherburne County, Minnesota, United States. The population was 1,630 at the 2000 census.

Clear Lake Township was organized in 1858.

== Geography ==
According to the United States Census Bureau, the township has a total area of 37.1 square miles (96 km^{2}), of which 33.7 square miles (87 km^{2}) is land and 3.4 square miles (8.8 km^{2}) (9.27%) is water.

Clear lake is bordered on the southwest by the Mississippi River.

== Demographics ==
As of the census of 2000, there were 1,630 people, 574 households, and 478 families residing in the township. The population density was 48.4 inhabitants per square mile (18.7/km^{2}). There were 821 housing units at an average density of 24.4 per square mile (9.4/km^{2}). The racial makeup of the township was 98.53% White, 0.25% African American, 0.06% Native American, 0.06% Asian, 0.80% from other races, and 0.31% from two or more races. Hispanic or Latino of any race were 0.92% of the population.

There were 574 households, out of which 38.9% had children under the age of 18 living with them, 79.3% were married couples living together, 2.8% had a female householder with no husband present, and 16.6% were non-families. 13.8% of all households were made up of individuals, and 4.4% had someone living alone who was 65 years of age or older. The average household size was 2.84 and the average family size was 3.12.

In the township the population was spread out, with 27.7% under the age of 18, 6.6% from 18 to 24, 28.3% from 25 to 44, 28.2% from 45 to 64, and 9.1% who were 65 years of age or older. The median age was 37 years. For every 100 females, there were 104.3 males. For every 100 females age 18 and over, there were 105.0 males.

The median income for a household in the township was $63,229, and the median income for a family was $67,500. Males had a median income of $45,735 versus $31,136 for females. The per capita income for the township was $29,599. None of the families and 0.5% of the population were living below the poverty line, including no under eighteens and 4.0% of those over 64.
