= Baldwin, Minnesota =

- City
- Interactive map of Baldwin, Minnesota
- Location within Minnesota Location within the United States
- Coordinates: 45.5177°N 93.5519°W
- Country: United States
- State: Minnesota
- County: Sherburne
- Founded: 1858
- Incorporated: 2024

Government
  - Type: Mayor–council
  - Mayor: Jay Swanson
  - Councilmembers: Jeff Holm; Scott Case; Alan Walker; Tom Rush

Area
  - Total: 34.629 sq mi (89.689 km^{2})
  - Land: 32.896 sq mi (85.200 km^{2})
  - Water: 1.734 sq mi (4.490 km^{2}) 5.00%
- Elevation: 971 ft (296 m)

Population (2020)
  - Total: 7,104
  - Estimate (2025): 7,231
  - Density: 216.0/sq mi (83.38/km^{2})
- Time zone: UTC−6 (Central (CST))
  - Summer (DST): UTC−5 (CDT)
- ZIP Code: 55371
- Area code: 763
- FIPS code: 27-03282
- GNIS feature ID: 2832429
- Website: baldwinmn.gov

Baldwin is a city in Sherburne County, Minnesota, United States. The population was 7,104 as of the 2020 census, and was estimated at 7,231 in 2025.

== History ==
Baldwin Township was organized in 1858, and named for Francis Eugene Baldwin, a county official and afterward state senator. Baldwin Township incorporated as a city in 2024.

== Geography ==
According to the United States Census Bureau, the city has a total area of 34.629 square miles (89.69 km^{2}), of which 32.896 square miles (85.20 km^{2}) is land and 1.733 square miles (4.49 km^{2}) (5.00%) is water.

== Demographics ==
Historical population
Census	Pop.	Note	%±
1860	138		—
1870	234		69.6%
1880	256		9.4%
1890	285		11.3%
1900	416		46.0%
1910	588		41.3%
1920	649		10.4%
1930	464		−28.5%
1940	538		15.9%
1950	416		−22.7%
1960	492		18.3%
1970	1,099		123.4%
1980	2,412		119.5%
1990	2,909		20.6%
2000	4,672		60.6%
2010	6,739		44.2%
2020	7,104		5.4%
2025 (est.)	7,231		1.8%
U.S. Decennial Census; 2020 Census

=== 2020 census ===
As of the 2020 census, there were 7,104 people, 2,531 households, and 1,943 families residing in the township. The population density was 215.95 inhabitants per square mile (83.4/km^{2}). There were 2,639 housing units at an average density of 80.22 per square mile (31.0/km^{2}). The racial makeup of the township was 93.47% White, 0.41% African American, 0.25% Native American, 0.65% Asian, 0.01% Pacific Islander, 0.86% from some other races and 4.35% from two or more races. Hispanic or Latino people of any race were 1.77% of the population.

=== 2000 census ===
As of the 2000 census, there were 4,672 people, 1,573 households and 1,267 families residing in the township. The population density was 139.0 inhabitants per square mile (53.7/km^{2}). There were 1,650 housing units at an average density of 49.1 per square mile (19.0/km^{2}). The racial makeup of the township was 98.37% White, 0.13% African American, 0.26% Native American, 0.24% Asian, 0.17% from other races, and 0.83% from two or more races. Hispanic or Latino people of any race were 0.66% of the population.

There were 1,573 households, of which 45.7% had children under the age of 18 living with them, 70.7% were married couples living together, 5.5% had a female householder with no husband present, and 19.4% were non-families. 13.5% of all households were made up of individuals, and 2.5% had someone living alone who was 65 years of age or older. The average household size was 2.97 and the average family size was 3.27.

32.3% of the population were under the age of 18, 7.0% from 18 to 24, 35.5% from 25 to 44, 20.2% from 45 to 64, and 5.0% who were 65 years of age or older. The median age was 32 years. For every 100 females, there were 106.3 males. For every 100 females age 18 and over, there were 109.7 males.

The median household income was $60,607 and the family median income was $62,951. Males had a median income of $41,803 compared with $26,615 for females. The per capita income was $20,798. About 0.5% of families and 2.4% of the population were below the poverty line, including 2.5% of those under age 18 and 4.3% of those age 65 or over.
