= Palmer Township, Sherburne County, Minnesota =

Palmer Township, Minnesota
- Township
- Location within the state of Minnesota Palmer Township, Minnesota (the United States)
- Coordinates: 45°30′41″N 93°56′4″W
- Country: United States
- State: Minnesota
- County: Sherburne

Area
  - Total: 36.5 sq mi (94.6 km^{2})
  - Land: 34.9 sq mi (90.4 km^{2})
  - Water: 1.6 sq mi (4.1 km^{2})
- Elevation: 1,007 ft (307 m)

Population (2000)
  - Total: 2,414
  - Density: 69/sq mi (26.7/km^{2})
- Time zone: UTC-6 (Central (CST))
  - Summer (DST): UTC-5 (CDT)
- FIPS code: 27-49534
- GNIS feature ID: 0665250
- Website: https://www.palmertownshipmn.org/

Palmer Township is a township in Sherburne County, Minnesota, United States. The population was 2,414 at the 2000 census.

== History ==
Palmer Township was originally called Briggs Township, for settler Joshua Briggs, and under the latter name was organized in 1858. The present name of Palmer was adopted a few years later, the maiden name of Joshua Briggs' wife.

== Geography ==
According to the United States Census Bureau, the township has a total area of 36.5 square miles (94.6 km^{2}), of which 34.9 square miles (90.4 km^{2}) is land and 1.6 square miles (4.1 km^{2}) (4.36%) is water.

== Demographics ==
As of the census of 2000, there were 2,414 people, 829 households, and 679 families residing in the township. The population density was 69.1 inhabitants per square mile (26.7/km^{2}). There were 1,040 housing units at an average density of 29.8 per square mile (11.5/km^{2}). The racial makeup of the township was 98.59% White, 0.25% African American, 0.08% Native American, 0.33% Asian, 0.17% from other races, and 0.58% from two or more races. Hispanic or Latino of any race were 0.50% of the population.

There were 829 households, out of which 41.9% had children under the age of 18 living with them, 75.5% were married couples living together, 4.2% had a female householder with no husband present, and 18.0% were non-families. 14.7% of all households were made up of individuals, and 4.5% had someone living alone who was 65 years of age or older. The average household size was 2.88 and the average family size was 3.21.

In the township the population was spread out, with 29.3% under the age of 18, 6.3% from 18 to 24, 31.4% from 25 to 44, 23.9% from 45 to 64, and 9.1% who were 65 years of age or older. The median age was 36 years. For every 100 females, there were 111.8 males. For every 100 females age 18 and over, there were 105.9 males.

The median income for a household in the township was $61,125, and the median income for a family was $67,321. Males had a median income of $42,692 versus $30,259 for females. The per capita income for the township was $22,254. About 1.5% of families and 2.5% of the population were below the poverty line, including 3.4% of those under age 18 and 4.7% of those age 65 or over.
