= Becker Township, Sherburne County, Minnesota =

Becker Township, Minnesota
- Township
- Location within the state of Minnesota Becker Township, Minnesota (the United States)
- Coordinates: 45°24′20″N 93°50′5″W
- Country: United States
- State: Minnesota
- County: Sherburne

Area
  - Total: 55.8 sq mi (144.6 km^{2})
  - Land: 55.5 sq mi (143.7 km^{2})
  - Water: 0.35 sq mi (0.9 km^{2})
- Elevation: 1,007 ft (307 m)

Population (2000)
  - Total: 3,605
  - Density: 65/sq mi (25.1/km^{2})
- Time zone: UTC-6 (Central (CST))
  - Summer (DST): UTC-5 (CDT)
- ZIP code: 55308
- Area code: 763
- FIPS code: 27-04636
- GNIS feature ID: 0663546
- Website: https://www.beckertwpsherburnecomn.gov/

Becker Township is a township in Sherburne County, Minnesota, United States. The population was 3,605 at the 2000 census.

== History ==
Becker Township was organized in 1871, and named for George Loomis Becker, a state legislator.

== Geography ==
According to the United States Census Bureau, the township has a total area of 55.8 square miles (145 km^{2}), of which 55.5 square miles (144 km^{2}) is land and 0.3 square miles (0.78 km^{2}) (0.63%) is water.

Becker Township is bordered on the southwest by the Mississippi River.

== Demographics ==
As of the census of 2000, there were 3,605 people, 1,099 households, and 974 families residing in the township. The population density was 65.0 inhabitants per square mile (25.1/km^{2}). There were 1,285 housing units at an average density of 23.2 per square mile (9.0/km^{2}). The racial makeup of the township was 98.25% White, 0.11% African American, 0.19% Native American, 0.28% Asian, 0.28% from other races, and 0.89% from two or more races. Hispanic or Latino of any race were 0.64% of the population.

There were 1,099 households, out of which 53.7% had children under the age of 18 living with them, 80.0% were married couples living together, 4.7% had a female householder with no husband present, and 11.3% were non-families. 7.0% of all households were made up of individuals, and 1.2% had someone living alone who was 65 years of age or older. The average household size was 3.28 and the average family size was 3.45.

In the township the population was spread out, with 35.8% under the age of 18, 6.6% from 18 to 24, 35.6% from 25 to 44, 18.1% from 45 to 64, and 3.8% who were 65 years of age or older. The median age was 31 years. For every 100 females, there were 108.7 males. For every 100 females age 18 and over, there were 105.2 males.

The median income for a household in the township was $65,089, and the median income for a family was $65,960. Males had a median income of $48,150 versus $26,581 for females. The per capita income for the township was $23,015. About 1.8% of families and 2.7% of the population were below the poverty line, including 1.1% of those under age 18 and 5.1% of those age 65 or over.
