= Sherburne County, Minnesota =

County in Minnesota, United States

- County
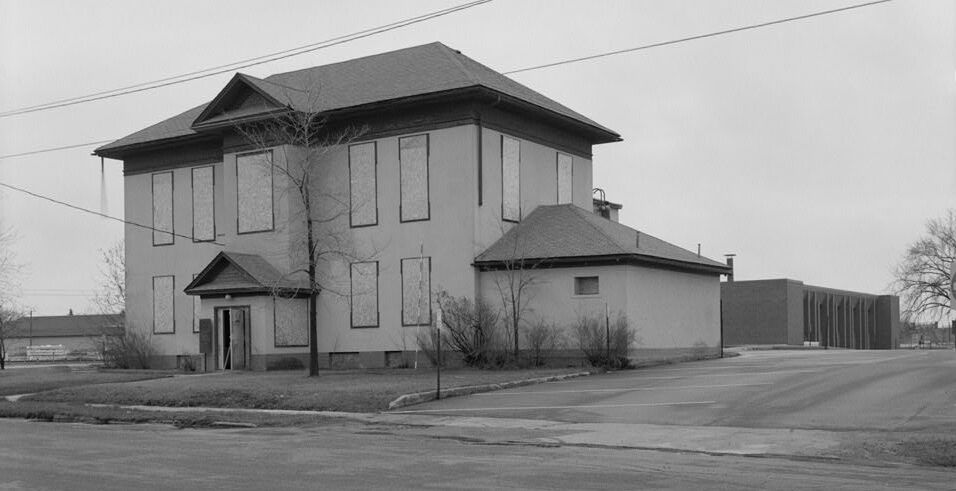
- Historic Sherburne County Courthouse, built 1877

- Logo

- Location within the U.S. state of Minnesota
- Coordinates: 45°26′N 93°46′W
- Country: United States
- State: Minnesota
- Founded: February 25, 1856
- Named for: Moses Sherburne
- Seat: Elk River
- Largest city: Elk River

Area
  - Total: 451 sq mi (1,170 km^{2})
  - Land: 433 sq mi (1,120 km^{2})
  - Water: 18 sq mi (47 km^{2}) 4.0%

Population (2020)
  - Total: 97,183
  - Estimate (2025): 104,194 ▲
  - Density: 225/sq mi (87/km^{2})
- Time zone: UTC−6 (Central)
  - Summer (DST): UTC−5 (CDT)
- Congressional district: 6th
- Website: www.co.sherburne.mn.us

Sherburne County is a county in Central Minnesota. At the 2020 census, the population was 97,183. The county seat is Elk River. Sherburne County is included in the Minneapolis-St. Paul-Bloomington, MN-WI Metropolitan Statistical Area.

== History ==
The Wisconsin Territory was established by the federal government effective July 3, 1836, and existed until its eastern portion was granted statehood (as Wisconsin) in 1848. Therefore, the federal government set up the Minnesota Territory effective March 3, 1849. The newly organized territorial legislature created nine counties across the territory in October of that year. One of those original counties, Benton, had its southern section partitioned off on February 25, 1856, to form a new county. It was named Sherburne, to recognize Moses Sherburne (1808-1868), a prominent area attorney, associate justice of the Supreme Court of the Minnesota Territory (1853-1857), who retired to the county and spent his final year of life there (in Orono).

The area now delineated by Big Lake Township was first settled in 1848; the small village was named Humboldt. When the county creation was announced in 1856, Humboldt was named the county seat. The area now covered by Elk River was also first settled in 1848. Two villages grew up, fairly close together: Orono (platted 1855); and Elk River Village (platted 1865). Their growth was such that by 1867 a county vote moved the county seat from Humboldt to Elk River (designated as "The Lower Town" in the vote, to distinguish it from nearby Orono. The two villages merged under the name 'Elk River' in 1881). Also in 1867, the village of Humboldt changed its name to Big Lake.

The boundaries of Sherburne County have remained as created since 1856.

== Geography ==
Soils of Sherburne County

The Mississippi River flows southeast along the county's south border. The Rum River flows southeast through the county's upper east portion. The Elk River rises in nearby Benton County, and flows south-southeast through the western and southern part of Sherburne County, discharging into the Mississippi at Elk River. The Saint Francis River also rises in Benton and flows southward through the central part of Sherburne County, discharging into the Elk just north of Big Lake.

The wordmark of Sherburne County in Minnesota.

The terrain of Sherburne County consists of low rolling hills, partially wooded, heavily sprinkled with lakes, ponds and depressions. The soil of Sherburne County contains considerable sand and gravel due to glacial activity in past epochs, and thus is less suitable for agriculture than much of Minnesota. The county terrain slopes to the south and east. The county's highest point lies 3 miles (4.8 km) east-southeast of Saint Cloud, at 1,110 ft (340 m) ASL. The county has a total area of 451 square miles (1,170 km^{2}), of which 433 square miles (1,120 km^{2}) is land and 18 square miles (47 km^{2}) (4.0%) is water.

=== Major highways ===
- U.S. Highway 10
- U.S. Highway 169
- Minnesota State Highway 24
- Minnesota State Highway 25
- Minnesota State Highway 101
- Minnesota State Highway 301

=== Airports ===
- Leaders Clear Lake Airport (8Y6) - one mile (1.6 km) east of Clear Lake
- Princeton Municipal Airport (PNM) - at SW edge of Princeton (on border between Mille Lacs and Sherburne counties)
- St. Cloud Regional Airport (STC) - two miles (3.2 km) east of Saint Cloud

=== Adjacent counties ===
- Mille Lacs County - north
- Isanti County - northeast
- Anoka County - east
- Hennepin County - southeast
- Wright County - southwest
- Stearns County - west
- Benton County - northwest

=== Protected areas ===
- Bridgeview Park Reserve
- Clear Lake Scientific and Natural Area
- Fremont Wildlife Management Area
- Grams Regional Park
- Harry W. Cater Homestead Prairie Scientific and Natural Area
- Island View Regional Park
- Oak Savanna Park
- Rice Lake Savanna Scientific and Natural Area
- Sand Dunes State Forest
- Sand Prairie Wildlife Management Area
- Sherburne National Wildlife Refuge
- Uncas Dunes Scientific and Natural Area
- William H. Houlton Conservation Area

== Demographics ==
Historical population
Census	Pop.	Note	%±
1860	723		—
1870	2,050		183.5%
1880	3,855		88.0%
1890	5,908		53.3%
1900	7,281		23.2%
1910	8,136		11.7%
1920	9,651		18.6%
1930	9,709		0.6%
1940	10,456		7.7%
1950	10,661		2.0%
1960	12,861		20.6%
1970	18,344		42.6%
1980	29,908		63.0%
1990	41,945		40.2%
2000	64,417		53.6%
2010	88,499		37.4%
2020	97,183		9.8%
2025 (est.)	104,194	▲	7.2%
U.S. Decennial Census; 1790-1960 1900-1990; 1990-2000 2010-2020

=== 2020 census ===
As of the 2020 census, the county had a population of 97,183. The median age was 36.9 years. 26.4% of residents were under the age of 18 and 12.3% of residents were 65 years of age or older. For every 100 females there were 105.4 males, and for every 100 females age 18 and over there were 105.4 males age 18 and over.

The racial makeup of the county was 88.0% White, 3.8% Black or African American, 0.5% American Indian and Alaska Native, 1.3% Asian, <0.1% Native Hawaiian and Pacific Islander, 1.2% from some other race, and 5.2% from two or more races. Hispanic or Latino residents of any race comprised 2.9% of the population.

49.1% of residents lived in urban areas, while 50.9% lived in rural areas.

There were 34,035 households in the county, of which 37.4% had children under the age of 18 living in them. Of all households, 59.5% were married-couple households, 15.0% were households with a male householder and no spouse or partner present, and 17.3% were households with a female householder and no spouse or partner present. About 19.5% of all households were made up of individuals and 7.9% had someone living alone who was 65 years of age or older.

There were 35,909 housing units, of which 5.2% were vacant. Among occupied housing units, 82.9% were owner-occupied and 17.1% were renter-occupied. The homeowner vacancy rate was 0.8% and the rental vacancy rate was 7.3%.

=== Racial and ethnic composition ===
Sherburne County, Minnesota – Racial and ethnic composition Note: the US Census treats Hispanic/Latino as an ethnic category. This table excludes Latinos from the racial categories and assigns them to a separate category. Hispanics/Latinos may be of any race.
Race / Ethnicity (NH = Non-Hispanic)	Pop 1980	Pop 1990	Pop 2000	Pop 2010	Pop 2020	% 1980	% 1990	% 2000	% 2010	% 2020
White alone (NH)	29,292	41,031	61,935	81,983	84,761	97.94%	97.82%	96.15%	92.64%	87.22%
Black or African American alone (NH)	140	262	542	1,644	3,648	0.47%	0.62%	0.84%	1.86%	3.75%
Native American or Alaska Native alone (NH)	134	193	266	389	390	0.45%	0.46%	0.41%	0.44%	0.40%
Asian alone (NH)	131	193	368	1,126	1,277	0.44%	0.46%	0.57%	1.27%	1.31%
Native Hawaiian or Pacific Islander alone (NH)	x	x	12	18	22	x	x	0.02%	0.02%	0.02%
Other race alone (NH)	75	7	29	62	313	0.25%	0.02%	0.05%	0.07%	0.32%
Mixed race or Multiracial (NH)	x	x	556	1,336	3,952	x	x	0.86%	1.51%	4.07%
Hispanic or Latino (any race)	136	259	709	1,941	2,820	0.45%	0.62%	1.10%	2.19%	2.90%
Total	29,908	41,945	64,417	88,499	97,183	100.00%	100.00%	100.00%	100.00%	100.00%

=== 2000 census ===
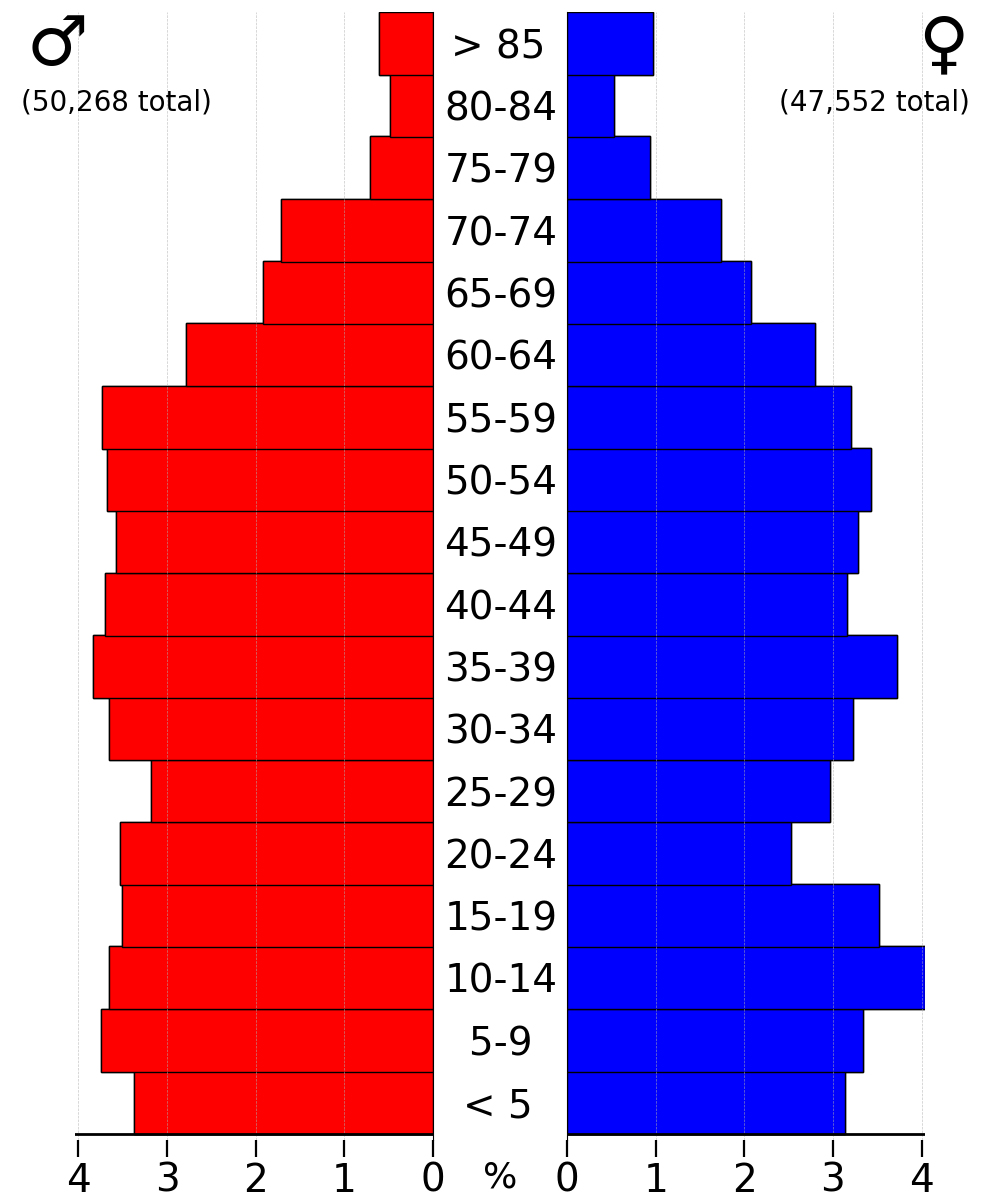
2022 US Census population pyramid for Sherburne County, from ACS 5-year estimates

At the census of 2000, there were 64,417 people, 21,581 households and 16,746 families in the county. The population density was 148 per square mile (57/km^{2}). There were 22,827 housing units at an average density of 52.7 per square mile (20.3/km^{2}). The county's racial makeup was 96.73% White, 0.85% Black or African American, 0.45% Native American, 0.58% Asian, 0.02% Pacific Islander, 0.43% from other races, and 0.95% from two or more races. 1.10% of the population were Hispanic or Latino of any race. 40.1% were of German, 13.6% Norwegian, 7.5% Swedish and 6.2% Irish ancestry.

There were 21,581 households, of which 44.90% had children under the age of 18 living with them, 66.20% were married couples living together, 7.50% had a female householder with no husband present, and 22.40% were non-families. 15.70% of all households were made up of individuals, and 5.20% had someone living alone who was 65 years of age or older. The average household size was 2.91 and the average family size was 3.27.

The county population contained 30.9% under the age of 18, 9.60% from 18 to 24, 33.90% from 25 to 44, 18.40% from 45 to 64, and 7.10% who were 65 years of age or older. The median age was 31 years. For every 100 females there were 104.30 males. For every 100 females age 18 and over, there were 103.20 males age 18 and over.

The median household income was $57,014 and the median family income was $61,790. Males had a median income of $41,601 and females $27,689. The per capita income for the county was $21,322. About 2.30% of families and 4.40% of the population were below the poverty line, including 3.50% of those under age 18 and 10.10% of those age 65 or over.

== Communities ==
=== Cities ===
- Baldwin
- Becker
- Big Lake
- Clear Lake
- Elk River (county seat)
- Princeton (part)
- St. Cloud (part)
- Zimmerman

=== Unincorporated communities ===
- Bailey
- Briggs Lake
- Cable
- Orrock
- Salida
- Santiago

=== Townships ===
- Becker Township
- Big Lake Township
- Blue Hill Township
- Clear Lake Township
- Haven Township
- Livonia Township
- Orrock Township
- Palmer Township
- Santiago Township

== Politics ==
Sherburne has voted for the Republican candidate in every presidential election since 2000.

United States presidential election results for Sherburne County, Minnesota
Year	Republican		Democratic		Third party(ies)	
Year	No.	%	No.	%	No.	%
1892	632	53.88%	290	24.72%	251	21.40%
1896	1,008	63.92%	536	33.99%	33	2.09%
1900	931	68.46%	373	27.43%	56	4.12%
1904	1,165	82.68%	186	13.20%	58	4.12%
1908	1,002	67.84%	366	24.78%	109	7.38%
1912	335	22.07%	360	23.72%	823	54.22%
1916	965	54.09%	731	40.98%	88	4.93%
1920	2,747	85.18%	307	9.52%	171	5.30%
1924	1,961	63.65%	180	5.84%	940	30.51%
1928	2,437	69.08%	1,064	30.16%	27	0.77%
1932	1,601	44.17%	1,938	53.46%	86	2.37%
1936	1,623	43.43%	1,881	50.33%	233	6.23%
1940	2,450	60.64%	1,570	38.86%	20	0.50%
1944	2,046	58.16%	1,447	41.13%	25	0.71%
1948	1,828	46.93%	1,958	50.27%	109	2.80%
1952	2,839	63.40%	1,630	36.40%	9	0.20%
1956	2,681	59.75%	1,796	40.03%	10	0.22%
1960	2,837	52.37%	2,568	47.41%	12	0.22%
1964	2,132	35.89%	3,787	63.75%	21	0.35%
1968	2,737	41.51%	3,481	52.80%	375	5.69%
1972	4,332	50.03%	4,070	47.01%	256	2.96%
1976	4,361	38.11%	6,678	58.36%	403	3.52%
1980	6,035	44.31%	6,229	45.73%	1,356	9.96%
1984	7,738	55.43%	6,140	43.98%	82	0.59%
1988	8,360	50.66%	7,959	48.23%	183	1.11%
1992	7,339	33.60%	7,843	35.91%	6,659	30.49%
1996	8,699	37.37%	10,551	45.33%	4,025	17.29%
2000	16,813	54.53%	12,109	39.27%	1,913	6.20%
2004	25,182	60.75%	15,816	38.15%	456	1.10%
2008	26,140	58.10%	17,957	39.91%	893	1.98%
2012	27,848	59.88%	17,597	37.84%	1,064	2.29%
2016	31,053	64.31%	13,293	27.53%	3,937	8.15%
2020	36,222	65.13%	18,065	32.48%	1,325	2.38%
2024	38,491	66.41%	18,329	31.62%	1,140	1.97%

== See also ==
- Great River Regional Library
- National Register of Historic Places listings in Sherburne County, Minnesota
