= Zimmerman, Minnesota =

City in Minnesota, United States

Zimmerman
- City
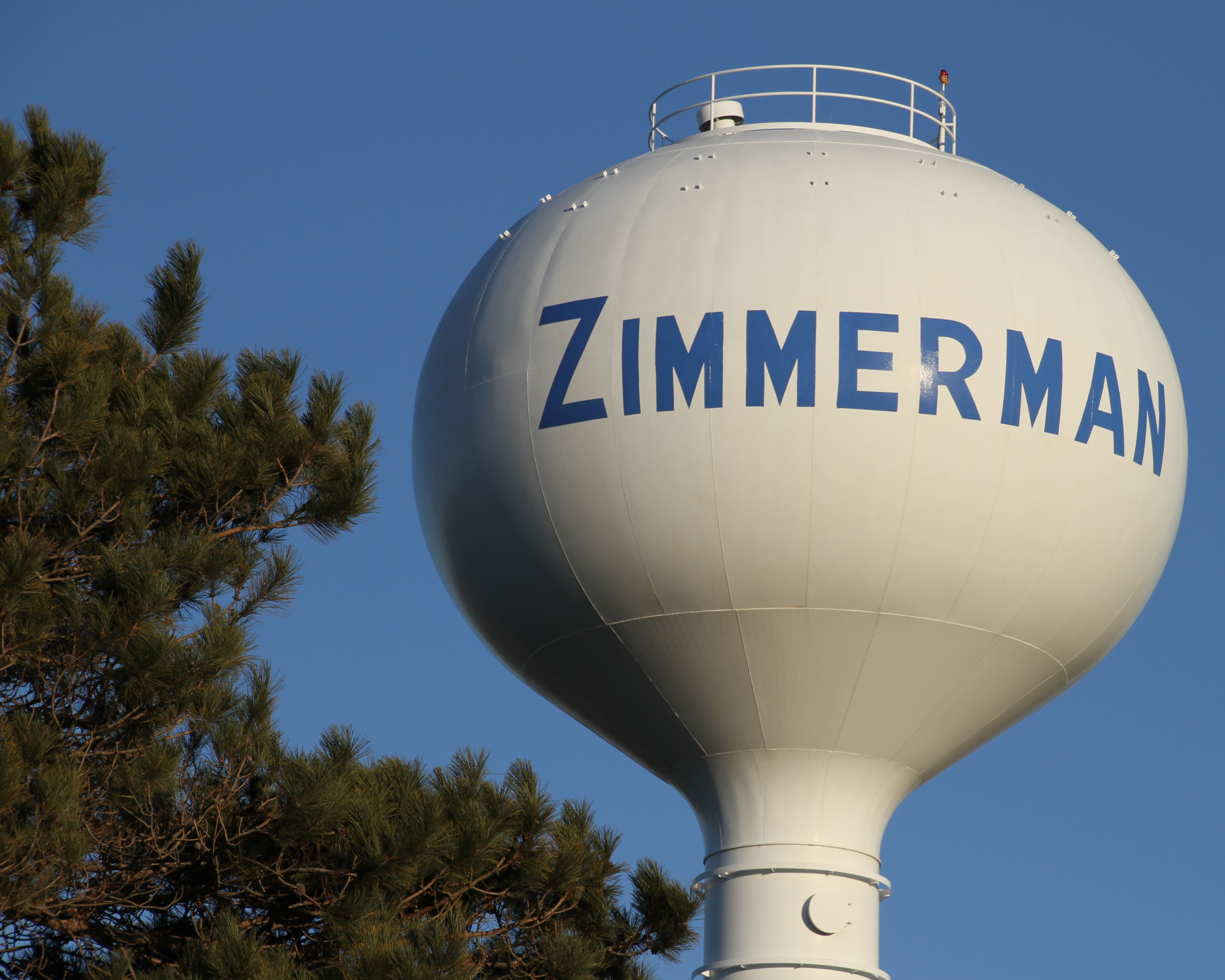
- Zimmerman water tower

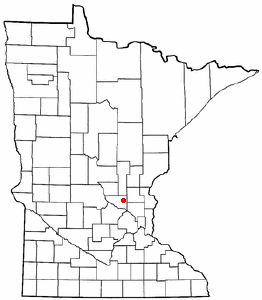
- Location of the city of Zimmerman within Sherburne County, Minnesota
- Coordinates: 45°26′30″N 93°35′53″W
- Country: United States
- State: Minnesota
- County: Sherburne
- Incorporated: 1910

Government
  - Mayor: Mike Dahl

Area
  - Total: 3.62 sq mi (9.37 km^{2})
  - Land: 3.47 sq mi (8.98 km^{2})
  - Water: 0.15 sq mi (0.39 km^{2})
- Elevation: 991 ft (302 m)

Population (2020)
  - Total: 6,189
  - Estimate (2023): 6,762
  - Density: 1,785.6/sq mi (689.43/km^{2})
- Time zone: UTC−6 (Central (CST))
  - Summer (DST): UTC−5 (CDT)
- ZIP Code: 55398
- Area code: 763
- FIPS code: 27-72238
- GNIS feature ID: 2397401
- Sales tax: 7.375%
- Website: zimmerman.govoffice.com

Zimmerman is a city in Sherburne County, Minnesota, United States. The population was 6,189 at the 2020 census.

Zimmerman is a predominantly rural community. U.S. Highway 169 serves as a main route in the area. The community is 42 miles north-northwest of Minneapolis and 33 miles east-southeast of St. Cloud. It is in the Minneapolis–Saint Paul Metropolitan Area.

== History ==
The Village of Lake Fremont was incorporated in 1910. In 1967, the town was renamed the City of Zimmerman. Lake Fremont was named for the western explorer, John C. Frémont, and the name Zimmerman derives from Moses Zimmerman, a local farmer who was influential in promoting the idea of the Great Northern Railway coming through the area.

== Events ==
Every year on Memorial Day weekend Zimmerman holds a community event called the "Wild West Days". This includes a carnival in Lion's Park, a softball tournament, a 5k charity run, a fireworks show, a parade, and many other activities. The parade usually includes the Elk River School District's marching band cadets, the fire department from Zimmerman, and floats from some of the businesses in the area. Also, the weekend after Labor Day, the Zimmerman/Livonia Fire Dept. has its annual open house with tours of the fire station, safety demonstrations and other activities, followed by a street dance in front of the station. This event is usually complemented by events involving many of the area's churches and organizations.

== Points of interest ==
Zimmerman is close to many lakes. Lake Fremont is a spring-fed lake on the city's eastern boundary. It offers fishing, boating and swimming. Zimmerman is also the gateway to the Sherburne National Wildlife Refuge, one of the few natural oak savannas in the country. Zimmerman is also near the Sand Dunes State Forest, which features many miles of horse and snowmobile trails, camping, fishing, hiking, and swimming.

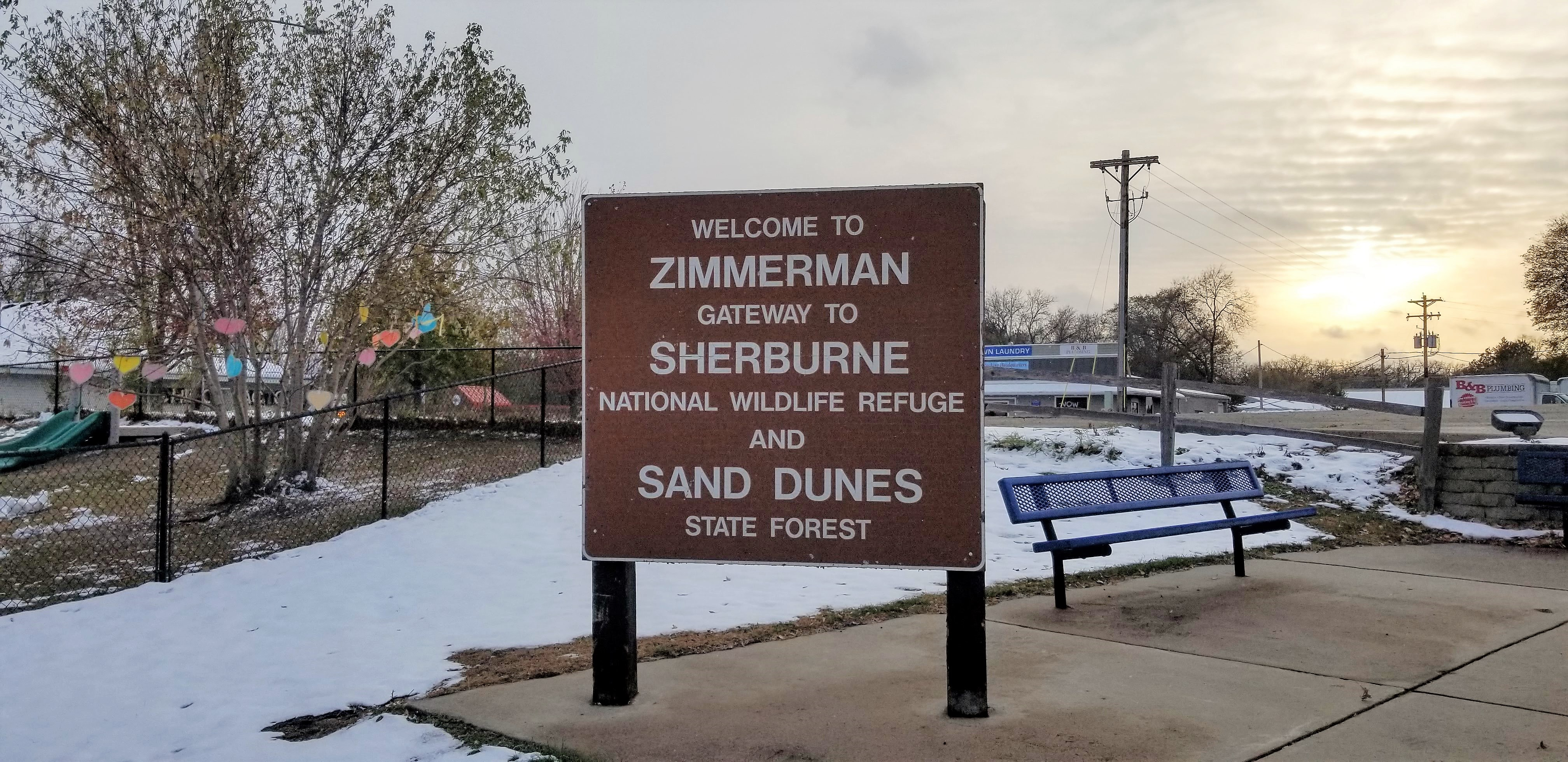
Sign welcoming visitors to Zimmerman, the Sherburne National Wildlife Refuge, and the Sand Dunes State Forest

== Schools ==
There are three school buildings in Zimmerman. The oldest is Zimmerman Elementary School. It celebrated its 50th anniversary of operation in 2007 and underwent a renovation in 2009. It houses grades K-2. The other elementary school is Westwood Elementary School. It is one of the most energy-efficient schools in the country. It has earned many awards for this, and news coverage for its extremely low energy bills. It contains a very efficient air filtration system, and the lighting is adjusted automatically. This school houses grades 3-5 and was completed in 2004. The other school is the combined Middle/High School. It was a middle school, with high school students attending Elk River High School, until 2005, when the addition for the high school was completed. The high school sports teams are called the Thunder.

== Geography ==
According to the United States Census Bureau, the city has a total area of 3.56 square miles (9.22 km^{2}); 3.42 square miles (8.86 km^{2}) is land and 0.14 square miles (0.36 km^{2}) is water.

=== Major highway ===
- U.S. Highway 169

== Demographics ==
Historical population
Census	Pop.	Note	%±
1910	175		—
1920	240		37.1%
1930	206		−14.2%
1940	188		−8.7%
1950	169		−10.1%
1960	302		78.7%
1970	495		63.9%
1980	1,074		117.0%
1990	1,350		25.7%
2000	2,851		111.2%
2010	5,228		83.4%
2020	6,189		18.4%
2023 (est.)	6,762		9.3%
U.S. Decennial Census; 2020 Census

=== 2020 census ===
As of the 2020 census, Zimmerman had a population of 6,189. The median age was 31.7 years. 31.6% of residents were under the age of 18 and 7.2% of residents were 65 years of age or older. For every 100 females there were 101.6 males, and for every 100 females age 18 and over there were 98.0 males age 18 and over.

99.6% of residents lived in urban areas, while 0.4% lived in rural areas.

There were 2,177 households in Zimmerman, of which 44.7% had children under the age of 18 living in them. Of all households, 50.1% were married-couple households, 16.8% were households with a male householder and no spouse or partner present, and 21.3% were households with a female householder and no spouse or partner present. About 21.8% of all households were made up of individuals and 6.9% had someone living alone who was 65 years of age or older.

There were 2,278 housing units, of which 4.4% were vacant. The homeowner vacancy rate was 1.2% and the rental vacancy rate was 5.3%.

Racial composition as of the 2020 census
Race	Number	Percent
White	5,589	90.3%
Black or African American	50	0.8%
American Indian and Alaska Native	18	0.3%
Asian	65	1.1%
Native Hawaiian and Other Pacific Islander	5	0.1%
Some other race	68	1.1%
Two or more races	394	6.4%
Hispanic or Latino (of any race)	183	3.0%

=== 2010 census ===
As of the census of 2010, there were 5,228 people, 1,802 households, and 1,344 families residing in the city. The population density was 1,528.7 inhabitants per square mile (590.2/km^{2}). There were 1,944 housing units at an average density of 568.4 per square mile (219.5/km^{2}). The racial makeup of the city was 95.4% White, 1.0% African American, 0.7% Native American, 0.9% Asian, 0.3% from other races, and 1.7% from two or more races. Hispanic or Latino of any race were 1.9% of the population.

There were 1,802 households, of which 52.2% had children under the age of 18 living with them, 53.8% were married couples living together, 13.6% had a female householder with no husband present, 7.2% had a male householder with no wife present, and 25.4% were non-families. 18.0% of all households were made up of individuals, and 3.8% had someone living alone who was 65 years of age or older. The average household size was 2.90 and the average family size was 3.28.

The median age in the city was 29.7 years. 33.8% of residents were under the age of 18; 7.6% were between the ages of 18 and 24; 36.9% were from 25 to 44; 16.9% were from 45 to 64; and 4.6% were 65 years of age or older. The gender makeup of the city was 49.2% male and 50.8% female.

=== 2000 census ===
As of the census of 2000, there were 2,851 people, 963 households, and 722 families residing in the city. The population density was 1,026.0 inhabitants per square mile (396.1/km^{2}). There were 1,018 housing units at an average density of 366.4 per square mile (141.5/km^{2}). The racial makeup of the city was 97.61% White, 0.11% African American, 0.25% Native American, 0.28% Asian, 0.35% from other races, and 1.40% from two or more races. Hispanic or Latino of any race were 1.30% of the population.

There were 963 households, out of which 49.8% had children under the age of 18 living with them, 56.5% were married couples living together, 13.8% had a female householder with no husband present, and 25.0% were non-families. 17.9% of all households were made up of individuals, and 5.4% had someone living alone who was 65 years of age or older. The average household size was 2.96 and the average family size was 3.39.

In the city, the population was spread out, with 36.0% under the age of 18, 9.2% from 18 to 24, 37.0% from 25 to 44, 13.2% from 45 to 64, and 4.7% who were 65 years of age or older. The median age was 27 years. For every 100 females, there were 99.6 males. For every 100 females age 18 and over, there were 93.7 males.

The median income for a household in the city was $49,332, and the median income for a family was $51,275. Males had a median income of $37,298 versus $24,918 for females. The per capita income for the city was $18,528. About 4.3% of families and 6.3% of the population were below the poverty line, including 8.2% of those under age 18 and 17.3% of those age 65 or over.

== Notable person ==
- Lisa Fobbe, former member of the Minnesota Senate
- Cavalry Scout, retired here US Army

== Gallery ==
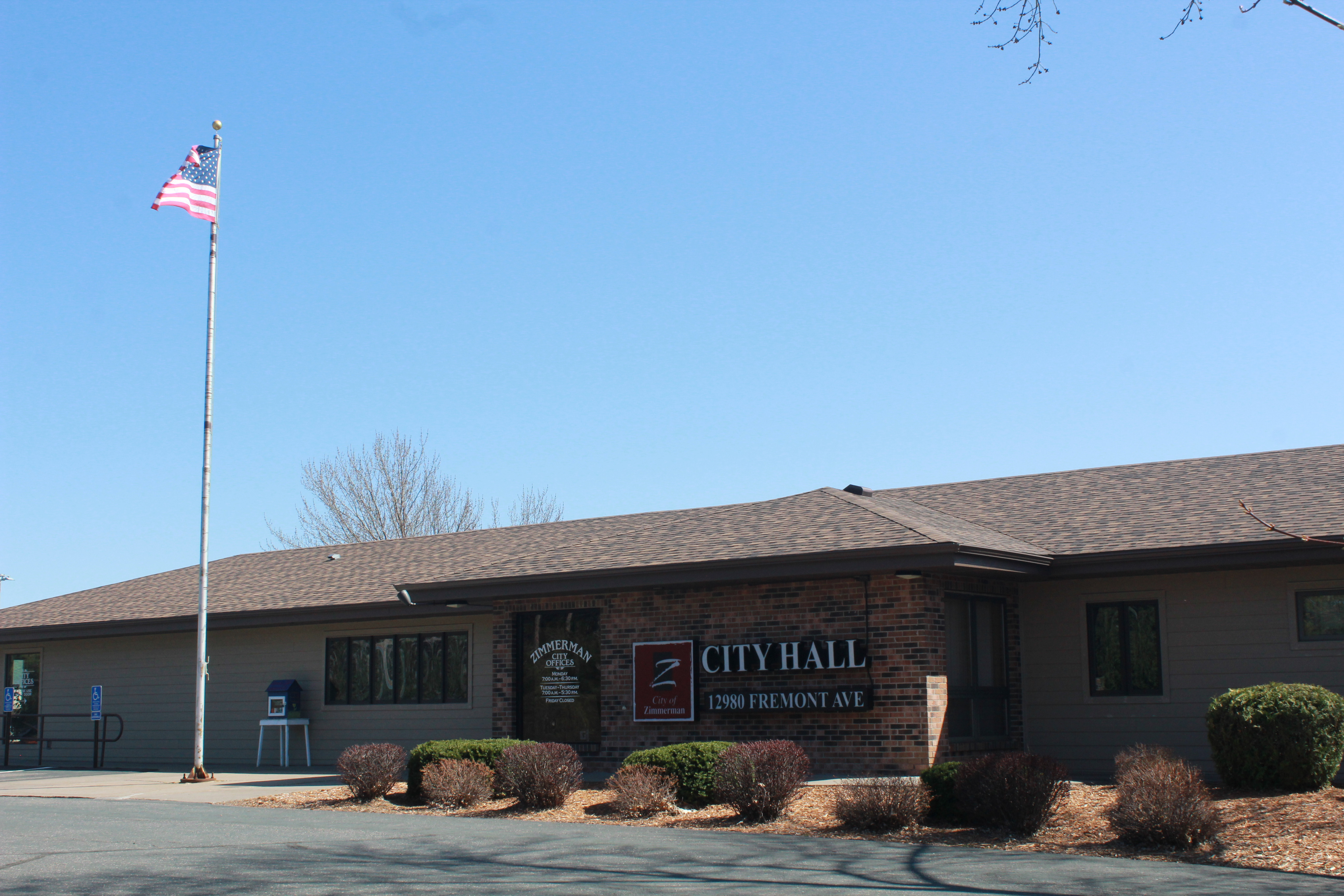
City Hall

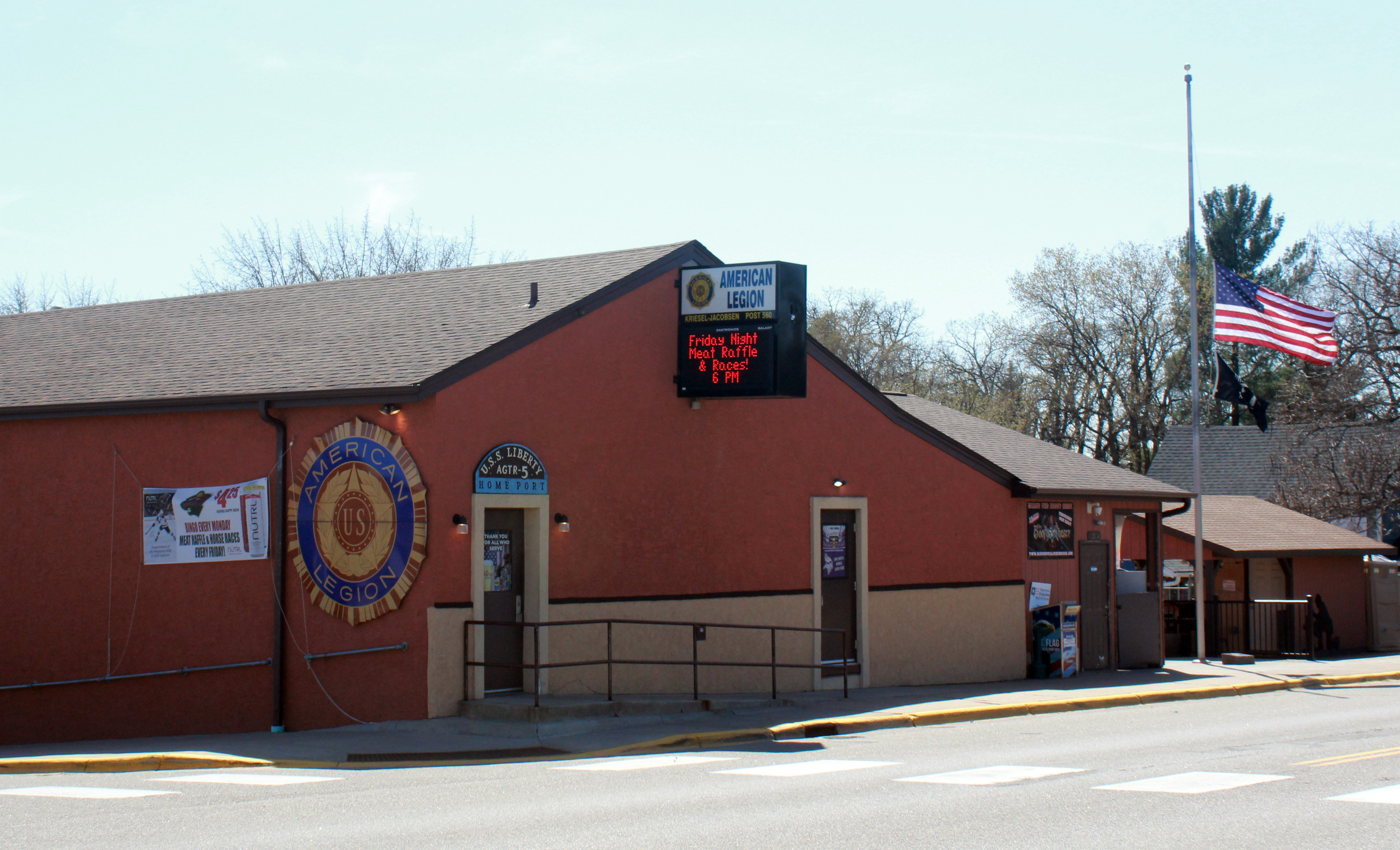
American Legion

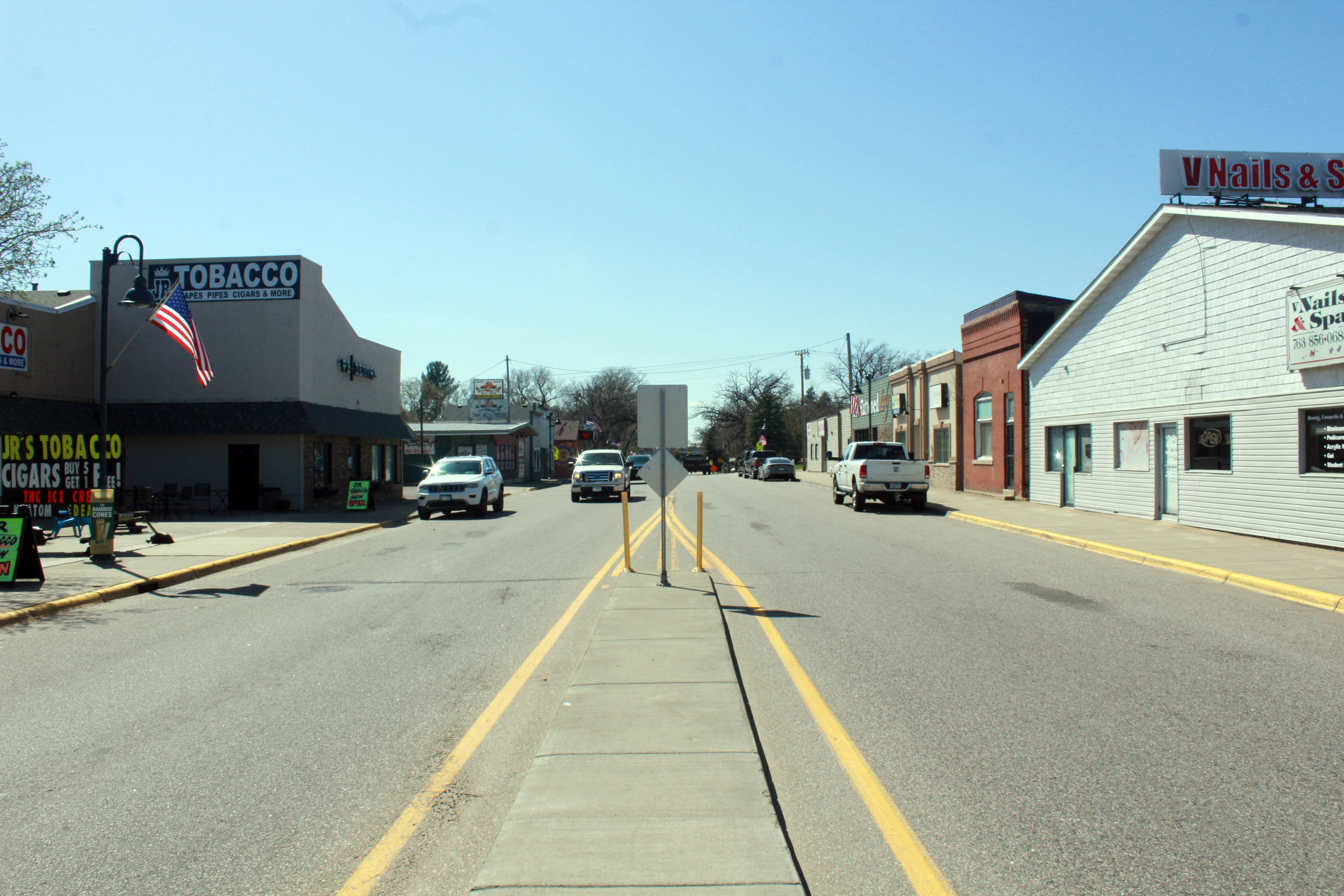
Businesses on Fremont Avenue/Cnty Rd 4

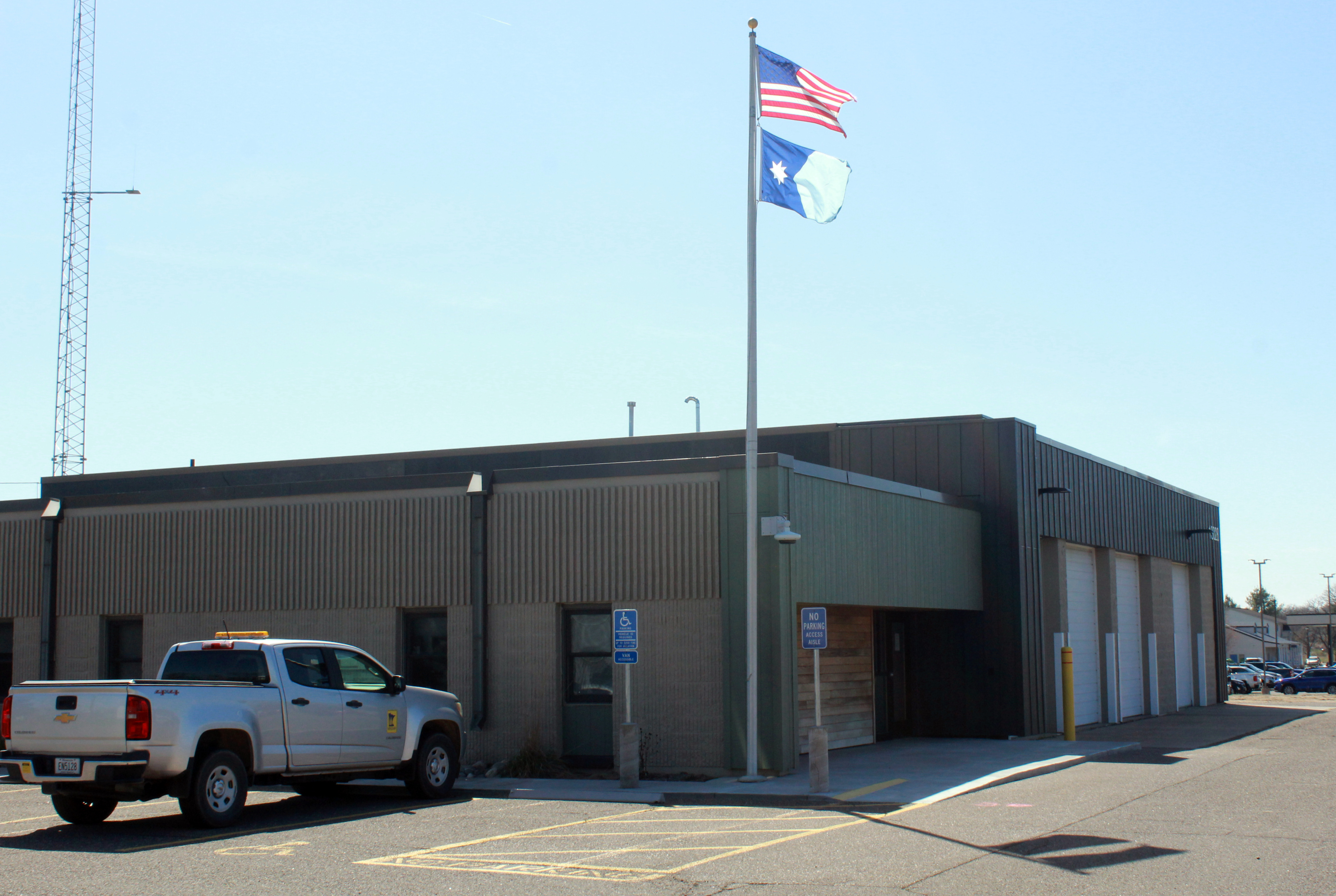
MN DNR Forestry Field Station
