= Orrock Township, Sherburne County, Minnesota =

Orrock Township, Minnesota
- Township
- Location within the state of Minnesota Orrock Township, Minnesota (the United States)
- Coordinates: 45°24′41″N 93°41′38″W
- Country: United States
- State: Minnesota
- County: Sherburne

Area
  - Total: 36.3 sq mi (93.9 km^{2})
  - Land: 34.9 sq mi (90.4 km^{2})
  - Water: 1.4 sq mi (3.5 km^{2})
- Elevation: 991 ft (302 m)

Population (2000)
  - Total: 2,764
  - Density: 79/sq mi (30.6/km^{2})
- Time zone: UTC-6 (Central (CST))
  - Summer (DST): UTC-5 (CDT)
- FIPS code: 27-48670
- GNIS feature ID: 0665219
- Website: https://orrocktownship.com/

Orrock Township is a township in Sherburne County, Minnesota, United States. The population was 2,764 at the 2000 census.

Orrock Township was organized in 1875, and named for Robert Orrock, a pioneer settler.

== Geography ==
According to the United States Census Bureau, the township has a total area of 36.2 square miles (94 km^{2}) of which 34.9 square miles (90 km^{2}) (93.9%) is land and 1.4 square miles (3.6 km^{2}) (3.72%) is water.

== Demographics ==
At the 2000 census, there were 2,764 people, 892 households and 753 families residing in the township. The population density was 79.2 per square mile (30.6/km^{2}). There were 952 housing units at an average density of 27.3 per square mile (10.5/km^{2}). The racial make-up was 97.72% White, 0.11% African American, 0.51% Native American, 0.43% Asian, 0.51% from other races, and 0.72% from two or more races. Hispanic or Latino of any race were 1.05% of the population.

There were 892 households, of which 48.3% had children under the age of 18 living with them, 75.7% were married couples living together, 4.5% had a female householder with no husband present, and 15.5% were non-families. 10.3% of all households were made up of individuals, and 1.7% had someone living alone who was 65 years of age or older. The average household size was 3.10 and the average family size was 3.36.

32.9% of the population were under the age of 18, 6.8% from 18 to 24, 36.2% from 25 to 44, 20.2% from 45 to 64 and 3.9% who were 65 years of age or older. The median age was 33 years. For every 100 females, there were 109.1 males. For every 100 females age 18 and over, there were 109.4 males.

The median household income was $60,168 and the median family income was $61,599. Males had a median income of $42,593 and females $31,357. The per capita income was $22,540. About 2.7% of families and 4.5% of the population were below the poverty line, including 5.8% of those under age 18 and 3.5% of those age 65 or over.
