= Sherburne National Wildlife Refuge =

National wildlife refuge in Minnesota, United States

- IUCN category IV (habitat/species management area)
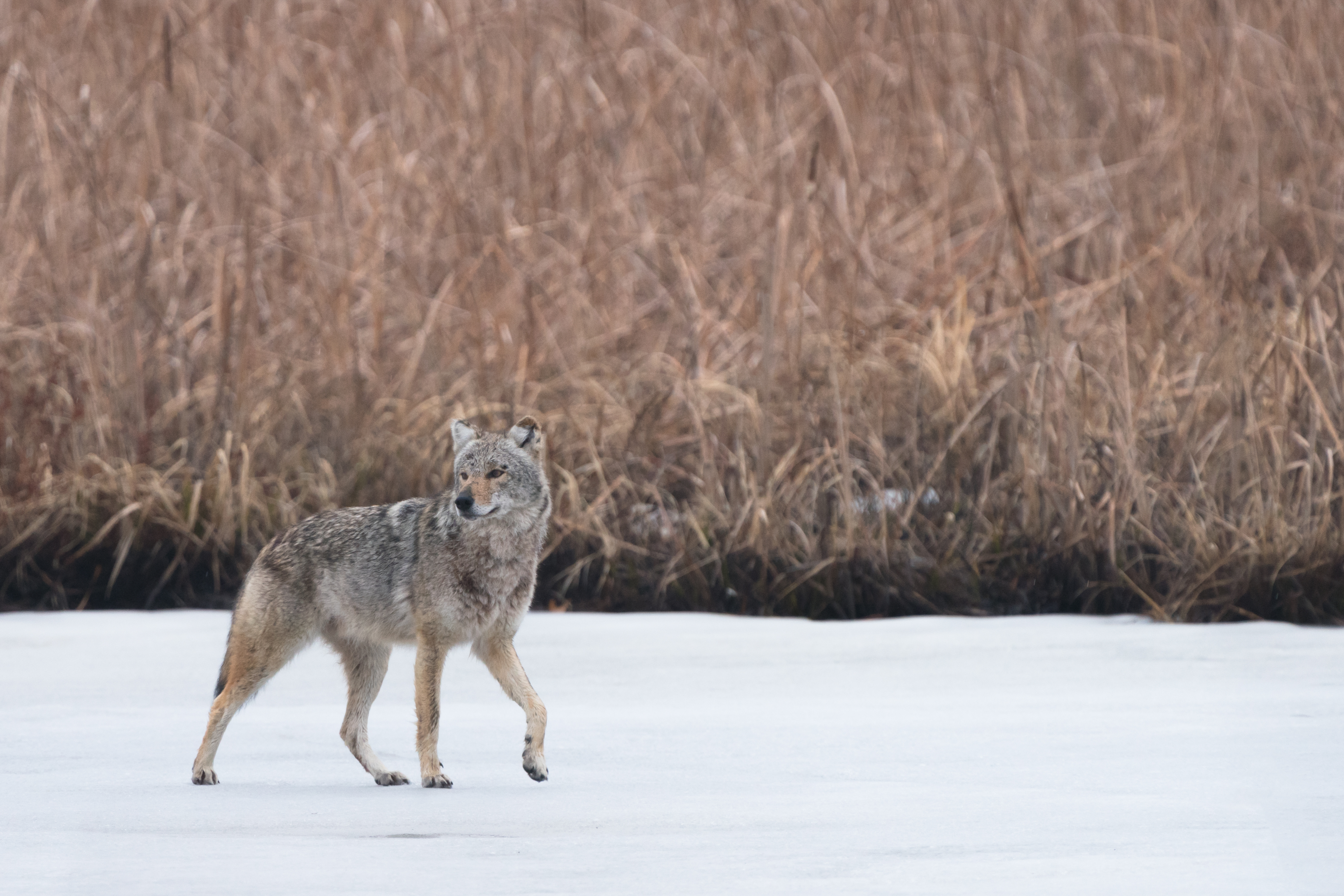
- Coyote walking on iced-over pond at Sherburne National Wildlife Refuge on March 25, 2020

- Location within the United States
- Location: Sherburne County, Minnesota
- Nearest city: Zimmerman, Minnesota
- Coordinates: 45°30′N 93°44′W
- Area: 30,700 acres (124 km^{2})
- Established: May 18, 1965
- Governing body: U.S. Fish and Wildlife Service
- Website: Sherburne National Wildlife Refuge

Sherburne National Wildlife Refuge is a National Wildlife Refuge of the United States in Sherburne County, Minnesota. The 30,700-acre (124 km^{2}) refuge protects mixed habitat types including oak savanna, Big Woods, and wetlands. The St. Francis River flows through the eastern side of the park. Over 230 species of birds, 58 species of mammals, and 25 species of reptiles and amphibians have been recorded in the refuge.

== History ==
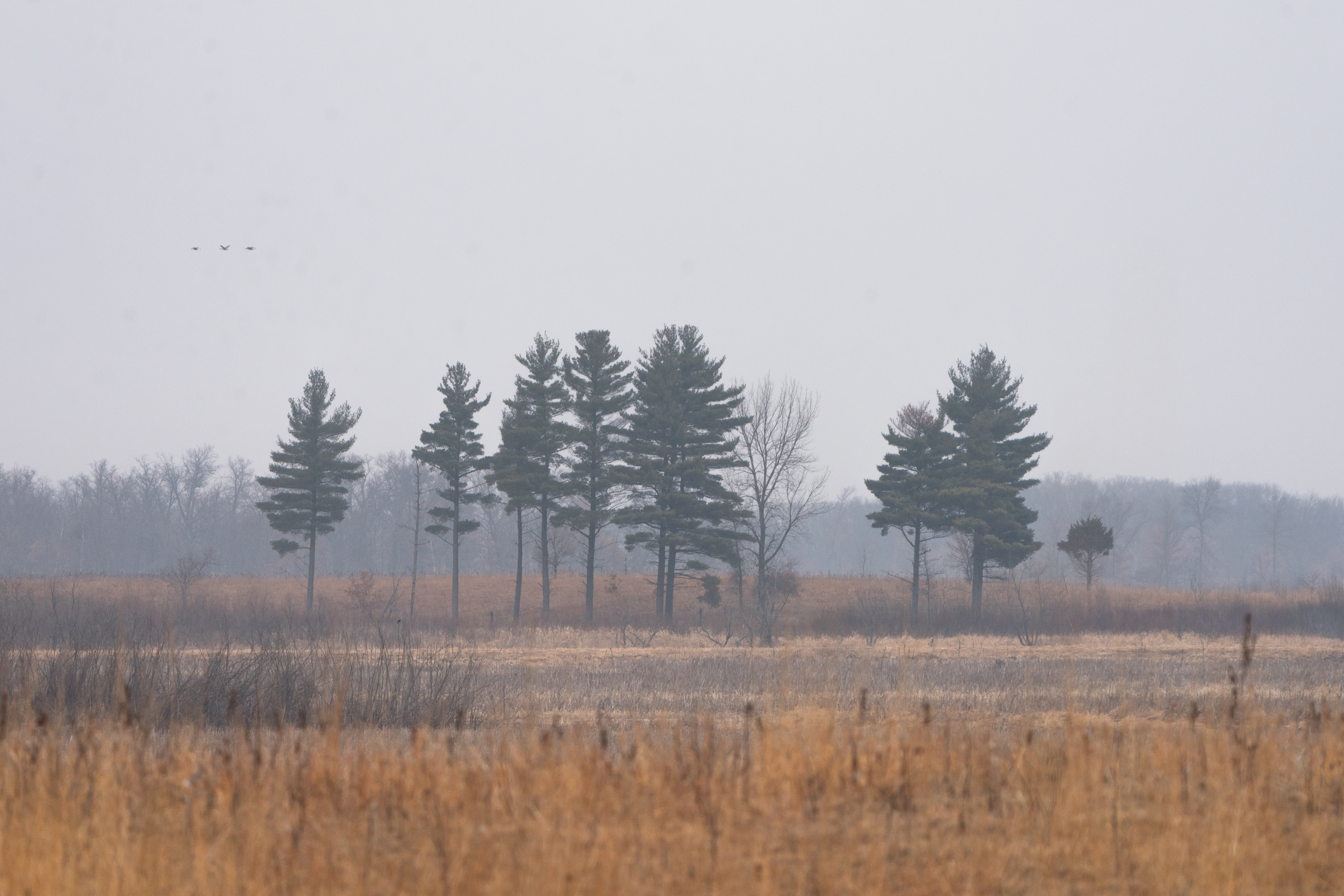
Sherburne National Wildlife Refuge, Minnesota

Native American village sites dating back to 1300 CE have been found within the refuge, although the area is assumed to have been inhabited for much longer. The mixture of habitats and abundance of water bodies produced a large and diverse wildlife population. The first European settlers arrived in the 1870s. As land use was altered for agriculture, wildfire was suppressed and drainage ditches were cut. This had the effect of reducing the number of year-round wetlands and increasing the density of the wooded areas.

By the 1940s conservationists and sportsmen recognized the former quality of the area and its potential for restoration. Minnesota's conservation department investigated the possibility of creating a state wildlife area. It was ultimately conceded that the state simply did not have the funds to acquire the land from its nearly 300 separate owners, and in 1960 a formal request was made to the United States Fish and Wildlife Service to consider the site for federal protection. This was formally approved on May 18, 1965, and purchase of refuge lands was begun with revenue from the sale of duck stamps.

== Recreation ==
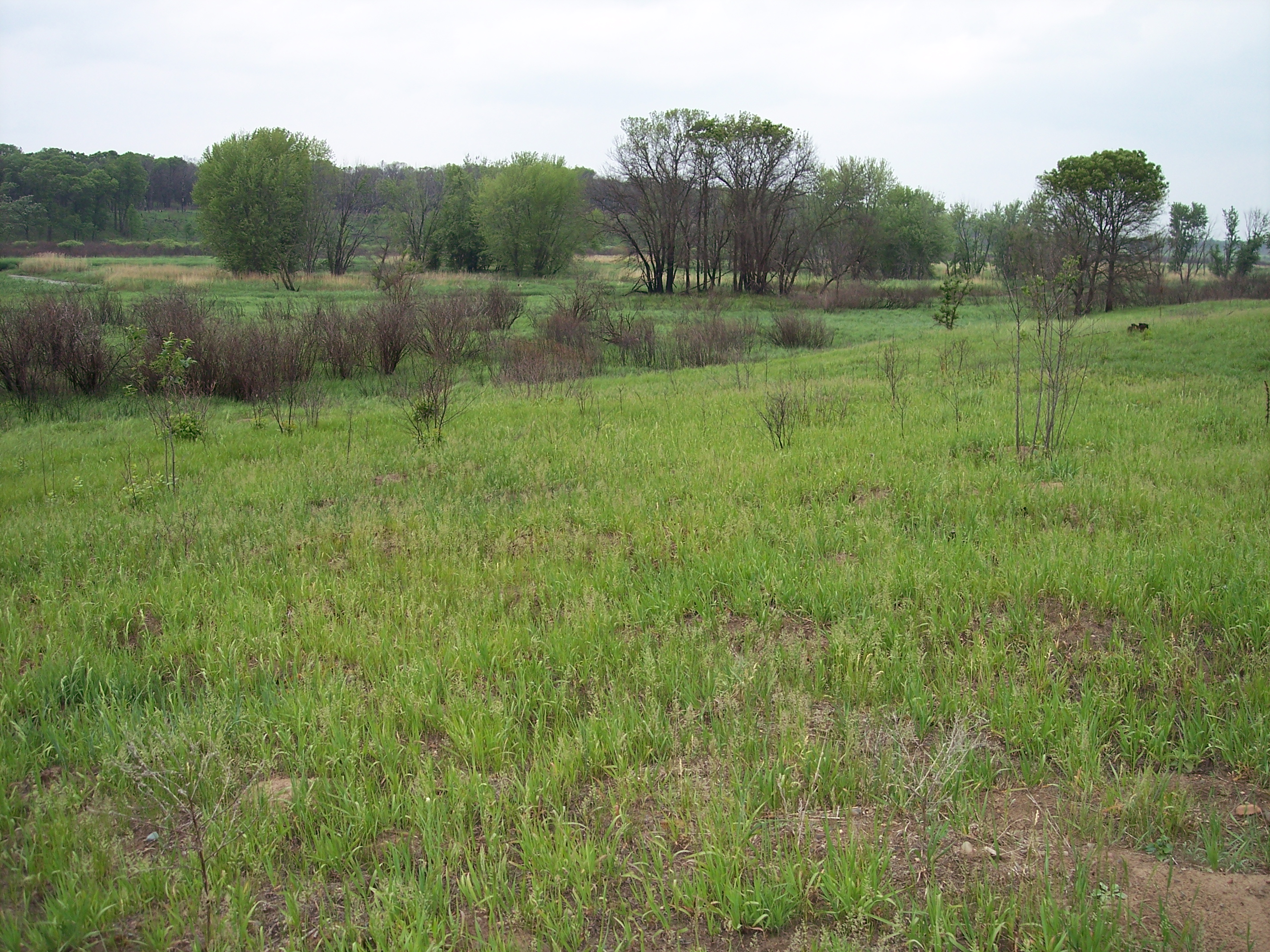
Sherburne National Wildlife Refuge

In winter most of the refuge lands are open for cross-country skiing, snowshoeing, and hiking. From March 1 to August 31 visitor access is restricted to the following areas so that wildlife can breed without disturbance.

- Prairie's Edge Wildlife Drive, which is open to automobiles, bicyclists, and hikers from late April through October. This 7.3-mile (11.7 km) gravel road loops through wetlands and prairie and features three observation decks and three short loop hikes.
- Blue Hill Trail, with three loops and a short spur to the top of 90-foot (27 m) Blue Hill, the highest point in the refuge.
- Mahnomen Trail, with another three interconnected loops through wooded uplands.
- Canoe route on a stretch of the St. Francis River and its tributary Battle Brook.
- Designated fishing access points.

Hikers can pick berries and mushrooms for personal consumption within 100 feet of the trails. Big game, small game, and waterfowl hunting seasons are held in the fall.

The entire refuge is for day-use only. Overnighting visitors are referred to a campground in the adjacent Sand Dunes State Forest.
