= Big Lake Township, Sherburne County, Minnesota =

Big Lake Township, Minnesota
- Township
- Location within the state of Minnesota Big Lake Township, Minnesota (the United States)
- Coordinates: 45°20′37″N 93°42′46″W
- Country: United States
- State: Minnesota
- County: Sherburne

Area
  - Total: 43.8 sq mi (113.5 km^{2})
  - Land: 42.3 sq mi (109.6 km^{2})
  - Water: 1.5 sq mi (3.9 km^{2})
- Elevation: 932 ft (284 m)

Population (2000)
  - Total: 6,785
  - Density: 160/sq mi (61.9/km^{2})
- Time zone: UTC-6 (Central (CST))
  - Summer (DST): UTC-5 (CDT)
- ZIP code: 55309
- Area code: 763
- FIPS code: 27-05770
- GNIS feature ID: 0663589

Big Lake Township is a township in Sherburne County, Minnesota, United States. The population was 6,785 at the 2000 census.

Big Lake Township was organized in 1858.

== Geography ==
Big Lake's geographical location is in a corridor placing it 30 minutes from St. Cloud and 35 minutes from Minneapolis. According to the United States Census Bureau, the township has a total area of 43.8 square miles (113 km^{2}), of which 42.3 square miles (110 km^{2}) is land and 1.5 square miles (3.9 km^{2}) (3.45%) is water.

It is bordered on the south by the Mississippi River.

== Demographics ==
As of the census of 2000, there were 6,785 people, 2,106 households, and 1,821 families residing in the township. The population density was 160.4 inhabitants per square mile (61.9/km^{2}). There were 2,165 housing units at an average density of 51.2 per square mile (19.8/km^{2}). The racial makeup of the township was 98.31% White, 0.18% African American, 0.24% Native American, 0.37% Asian, 0.12% Pacific Islander, 0.35% from other races, and 0.44% from two or more races. Hispanic or Latino of any race were 0.90% of the population.

There were 2,106 households, out of which 51.1% had children under the age of 18 living with them, 78.5% were married couples living together, 4.9% had a female householder with no husband present, and 13.5% were non-families. 8.7% of all households were made up of individuals, and 2.0% had someone living alone who was 65 years of age or older. The average household size was 3.20 and the average family size was 3.42.

In the township the population was spread out, with 33.5% under the age of 18, 6.5% from 18 to 24, 35.2% from 25 to 44, 20.4% from 45 to 64, and 4.3% who were 65 years of age or older. The median age was 33 years. For every 100 females, there were 103.0 males. For every 100 females age 18 and over, there were 103.9 males.

The median income for a household in the township was $65,185, and the median income for a family was $66,096. Males had a median income of $42,437 versus $29,884 for females. The per capita income for the township was $22,418. About 0.4% of families and 1.2% of the population were below the poverty line, including none of those under age 18 and 2.4% of those age 65 or over.
