= Santiago Township, Sherburne County, Minnesota =

Santiago Township, Minnesota
- Township
- Location within the state of Minnesota Santiago Township, Minnesota (the United States)
- Coordinates: 45°31′35″N 93°49′20″W
- Country: United States
- State: Minnesota
- County: Sherburne

Area
  - Total: 36.3 sq mi (94.1 km^{2})
  - Land: 36.1 sq mi (93.5 km^{2})
  - Water: 0.23 sq mi (0.6 km^{2})
- Elevation: 1,004 ft (306 m)

Population (2000)
  - Total: 1,555
  - Density: 43/sq mi (16.6/km^{2})
- Time zone: UTC-6 (Central (CST))
  - Summer (DST): UTC-5 (CDT)
- ZIP code: 55377
- Area code: 763
- FIPS code: 27-58522
- GNIS feature ID: 0665552

Santiago Township is a township in Sherburne County, Minnesota, United States. The population was 1,555 at the 2000 census.

== History ==
Santiago Township was organized in 1868.

== Geography ==
According to the United States Census Bureau, the township has a total area of 36.3 square miles (94.1 km^{2}), of which 36.1 square miles (93.5 km^{2}) is land and 0.2 square mile (0.6 km^{2}) (0.63%) is water.

== Demographics ==
As of the census of 2000, there were 1,555 people, 477 households, and 395 families residing in the township. The population density was 43.1 inhabitants per square mile (16.6/km^{2}). There were 483 housing units at an average density of 13.4/sq mi (5.2/km^{2}). The racial makeup of the township was 98.39% White, 0.26% African American, 0.19% Native American, 0.13% Asian, 0.06% from other races, and 0.96% from two or more races. Hispanic or Latino of any race were 0.26% of the population.

There were 477 households, out of which 53.2% had children under the age of 18 living with them, 74.2% were married couples living together, 3.8% had a female householder with no husband present, and 17.0% were non-families. 12.4% of all households were made up of individuals, and 3.1% had someone living alone who was 65 years of age or older. The average household size was 3.18 and the average family size was 3.46.

In the township the population was spread out, with 35.0% under the age of 18, 6.4% from 18 to 24, 37.4% from 25 to 44, 16.0% from 45 to 64, and 5.1% who were 65 years of age or older. The median age was 31 years. For every 100 females, there were 108.2 males. For every 100 females age 18 and over, there were 113.5 males.

The median income for a household in the township was $58,688, and the median income for a family was $60,962. Males had a median income of $40,982 versus $26,587 for females. The per capita income for the township was $19,029. About 5.2% of families and 8.5% of the population were below the poverty line, including 10.4% of those under age 18 and 13.8% of those age 65 or over.
