= Clear Lake, Minnesota =

City in Minnesota, United States

Clear Lake
- City
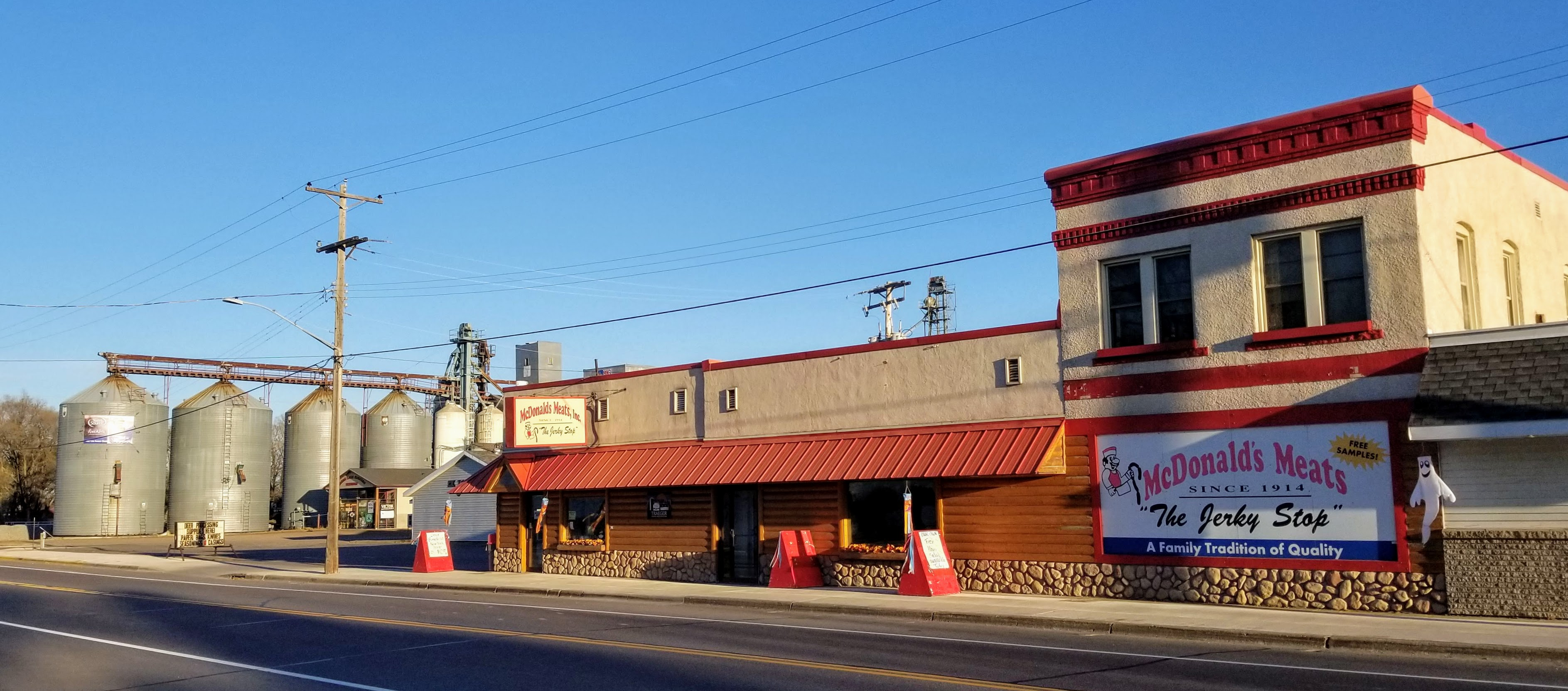
- Downtown Clear Lake
- Motto: "The Crossroads City"
- Location of Clear Lake within Sherburne County, Minnesota
- Coordinates: 45°26′43″N 93°59′56″W
- Country: United States
- State: Minnesota
- County: Sherburne

Area
  - Total: 1.10 sq mi (2.84 km^{2})
  - Land: 1.05 sq mi (2.71 km^{2})
  - Water: 0.050 sq mi (0.13 km^{2})
- Elevation: 994 ft (303 m)

Population (2020)
  - Total: 641
  - Density: 613.5/sq mi (236.86/km^{2})
- Time zone: UTC-6 (Central (CST))
  - Summer (DST): UTC-5 (CDT)
- ZIP code: 55319
- Area code: 320
- FIPS code: 27-11764
- GNIS feature ID: 0641296
- Website: www.clearlakemn.govoffice2.com

Clear Lake is a city in Sherburne County, Minnesota, United States. The population was 641 at the 2020 census.

U.S. Highway 10 and Minnesota State Highway 24 are two of the main routes in Clear Lake. Clear Lake is 13 miles southeast of St. Cloud and 24 miles northwest of Elk River.

== History ==
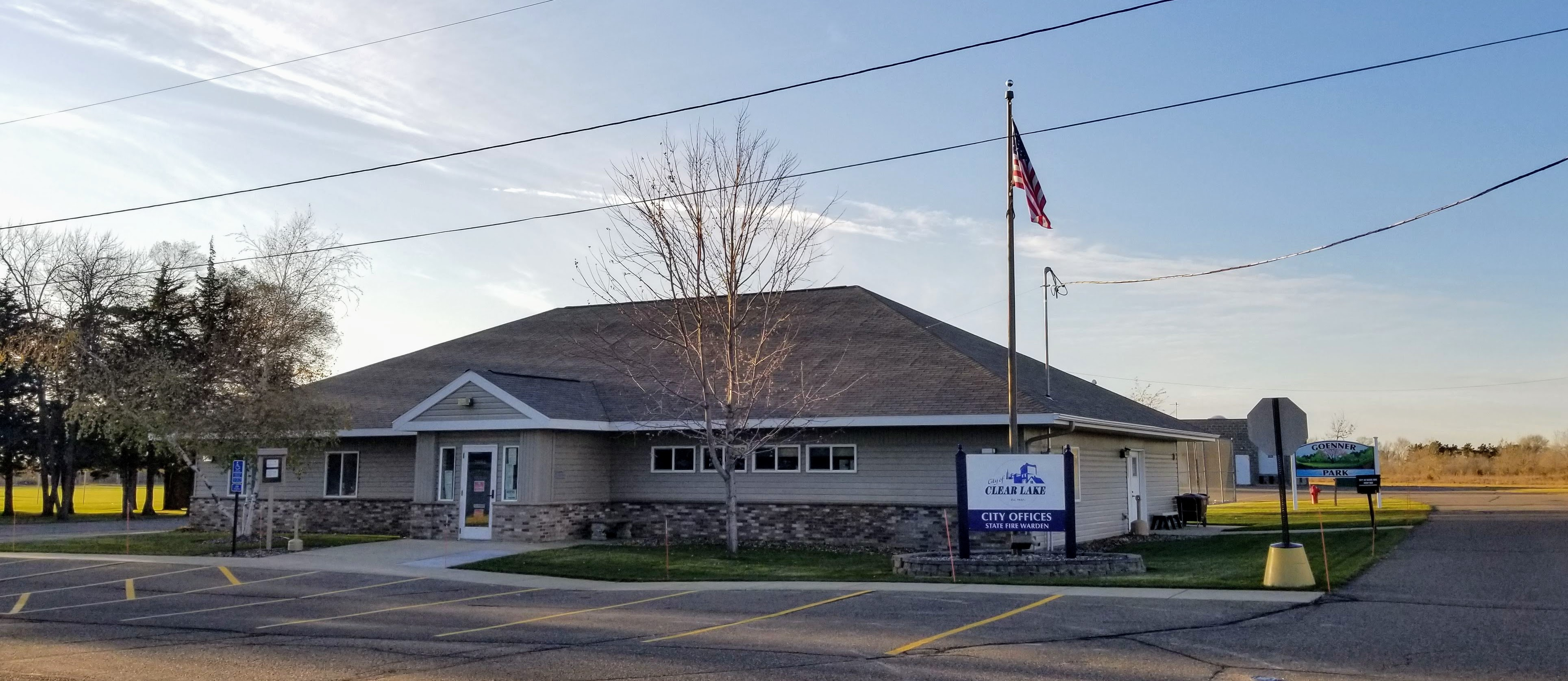
City offices of Clear Lake

Clear Lake was platted in 1879.

== Geography ==
According to the United States Census Bureau, the city has a total area of 1.08 square miles (2.80 km^{2}); 1.03 square miles (2.67 km^{2}) is land and 0.05 square miles (0.13 km^{2}) is water.

== Demographics ==
Historical population
Census	Pop.	Note	%±
1900	222		—
1910	263		18.5%
1920	275		4.6%
1930	242		−12.0%
1940	285		17.8%
1950	297		4.2%
1960	316		6.4%
1970	280		−11.4%
1980	266		−5.0%
1990	315		18.4%
2000	266		−15.6%
2010	545		104.9%
2020	641		17.6%
U.S. Decennial Census

=== 2010 census ===
As of the census of 2010, there were 545 people, 205 households, and 151 families residing in the city. The population density was 529.1 inhabitants per square mile (204.3/km^{2}). There were 222 housing units at an average density of215.5 per square mile (83.2/km^{2}). The racial makeup of the city was 98.3% White, 0.4% Native American, 0.2% Asian, 0.2% from other races, and 0.9% from two or more races. Hispanic or Latino of any race were 0.2% of the population.

There were 205 households, of which 43.9% had children under the age of 18 living with them, 59.5% were married couples living together, 10.2% had a female householder with no husband present, 3.9% had a male householder with no wife present, and 26.3% were non-families. 21.5% of all households were made up of individuals, and 5.4% had someone living alone who was 65 years of age or older. The average household size was 2.66 and the average family size was 3.05.

The median age in the city was 31.1 years. 30.3% of residents were under the age of 18; 6.9% were between the ages of 18 and 24; 35.7% were from 25 to 44; 18.5% were from 45 to 64; and 8.4% were 65 years of age or older. The gender makeup of the city was 49.0% male and 51.0% female.

=== 2000 census ===
As of the census of 2000, there were 266 people, 102 households, and 68 families residing in the city. The population density was 335.4 inhabitants per square mile (129.5/km^{2}). There were 103 housing units at an average density of 129.9 per square mile (50.2/km^{2}). The racial makeup of the city was 97.37% White, 0.75% African American, 0.38% Native American, 0.38% Asian, and 1.13% from two or more races. Hispanic or Latino of any race were 1.13% of the population.

There were 102 households, of which 37.3% had children under the age of 18 living with them, 55.9% were married couples living together, 7.8% had a female householder with no husband present, and 32.4% were non-families. 26.5% of all households were made up of individuals, and 14.7% had someone living alone who was 65 years of age or older. The average household size was 2.61 and the average family size was 3.19.

In the city, the population was spread out, with 28.2% under the age of 18, 10.5% from 18 to 24, 32.0% from 25 to 44, 17.3% from 45 to 64, and 12.0% who were 65 years of age or older. The median age was 33 years. For every 100 females, there were 103.1 males. For every 100 females age 18 and over, there were 103.2 males.

The median income for a household in the city was $40,625, and the median income for a family was $54,375. Males had a median income of $36,071 versus $22,813 for females. The per capita income for the city was $16,894. None of the families and 3.1% of the population were living below the poverty line, including no under eighteens and 13.3% of those over 64.

== Infrastructure ==
=== Transportation ===
U.S. Highway 10 and Minnesota State Highway 24 are two of the main routes in Clear Lake.

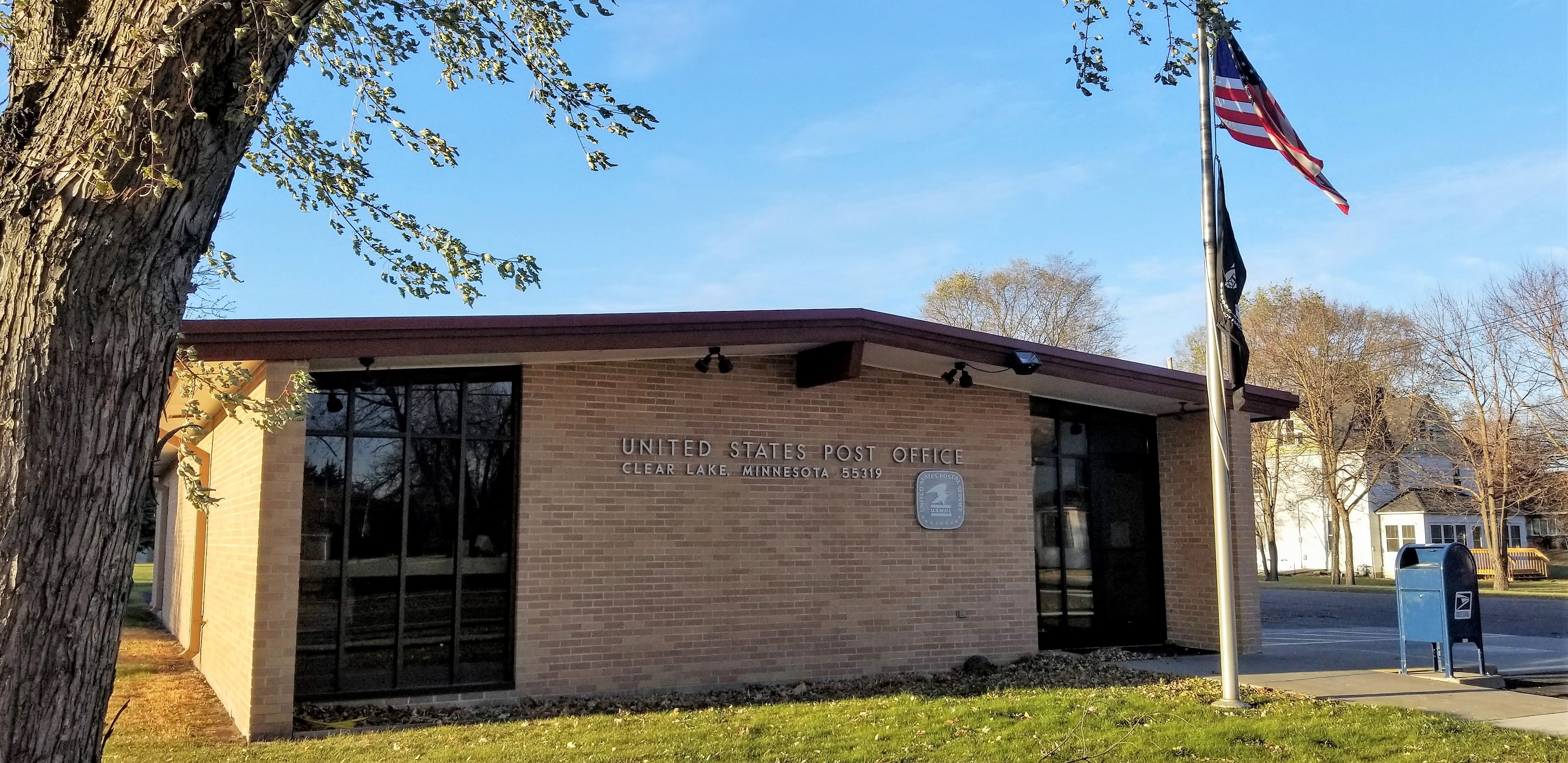
Clear Lake post office

Amtrak’s Empire Builder, which operates between Seattle/Portland and Chicago, passes through the town on BNSF tracks, but makes no stop. The nearest station is located in St. Cloud, 12 miles (19 km) to the northwest.

== Education ==
The majority portion of Clear Lake is in the St. Cloud Area School District. A discontinuous part of Clear Lake lies in the Becker Public School District.

The majority portion of Clear Lake is zoned to Clear View Elementary School, South Middle School, and Technical Senior High School.
