= Clear Lake =

Clear Lake may refer to:

== Inhabited places ==
=== Canada ===
- Clear Lake, Ontario (disambiguation)
- Wasagaming, Manitoba, also known as Clear Lake

=== United States ===
- Clear Lake, Illinois
- Clear Lake, Indiana
- Clear Lake, Iowa
- Clear Lake, Minnesota
- Clear Lake, Oregon
- Clear Lake, South Dakota, city in Deuel County
- Clear Lake, Marshall County, South Dakota, census-designated place
- Clear Lake, Texas, in Collin County
- Clear Lake (region), near Galveston Bay, Texas
- Clear Lake City (Greater Houston), Texas
- Clear Lake, Pierce County, Washington
- Clear Lake, Skagit County, Washington
- Clear Lake, Wisconsin
- Clear Lake (town), Wisconsin
- Clear Lake Shores, Texas, in Galveston County
- Clear Lake Township (disambiguation)
- Clearlake, California
- Clearlake Oaks, California

== Lakes ==
=== United States ===
- Clear Lake (California)
- Clear Lake (Orlando, Florida)
- Clear Lake (Iowa)
- Clear Lake (Maine)
- Clear Lake (Michigan), an index of lakes in Michigan named Clear Lake
- Clear Lake (Meeker County, Minnesota)
- Clear Lake (New York)
- Clear Lake (Herkimer County, New York)
- Clear Lake (Oregon), several lakes, including:
  - Clear Lake (Douglas County, Oregon)
  - Clear Lake (Linn County, Oregon)
  - Clear Lake (Wasco County, Oregon)
- Clear Lake (Deuel County, South Dakota)
- Clear Lake (Hamlin County, South Dakota)
- Clear Lake (Marshall County, South Dakota)
- Clear Lake (Minnehaha County, South Dakota)
- Clear Lake (Galveston Bay), a lake near Houston, Texas
- Clear Lake (Thurston County, Washington)
- Clear Lake, formed by Clear Creek Dam (Washington), in Yakima County
- Clear Lake Reservoir, Modoc County, California

=== Lakes in other places ===
- Clear Lake (Ross Island), Antarctica
- Clear Lake (Canada), several lakes in Canada with this name
- Clear Lake (Palau)

== Other uses ==
- Clear Lake AVA, a wine region in Lake County, California

== See also ==
- Clearlake (disambiguation)
- Lake Clear, New York
