= Clear Lake, Ontario =

Clear Lake, Ontario may refer to:

- Clear Lake, a community in Bracebridge, Ontario
- Clear Lake, Parry Sound District, Ontario

== See also ==
- Clear Lake (Canada) § Ontario
- Clear Lake (disambiguation)
