= List of lakes of Madison County, Montana =

There are at least 158 named lakes and reservoirs in Madison County, Montana.

== Lakes ==
- Alp Lake, 44°58′48″N 111°26′34″W, el. 9,678 feet (2,950 m)
- Avalanche Lake, 44°53′34″N 111°26′10″W, el. 9,035 feet (2,754 m)
- Axolotl Lake, 45°13′33″N 111°52′20″W, el. 7,303 feet (2,226 m)
- Axolotl Lakes, 45°14′03″N 111°52′22″W, el. 7,185 feet (2,190 m)
- Beall Lake, 45°37′39″N 112°05′56″W, el. 8,615 feet (2,626 m)
- Beehive Lake, 45°21′27″N 111°24′25″W, el. 9,619 feet (2,932 m)
- Big Brother Lake, 45°24′41″N 111°28′10″W, el. 8,343 feet (2,543 m)
- Blossom Lake, 45°33′10″N 112°04′11″W, el. 9,163 feet (2,793 m)
- Blue Danube Lake, 44°52′37″N 111°26′20″W, el. 9,035 feet (2,754 m)
- Blue Lake, 45°13′09″N 111°53′02″W, el. 7,753 feet (2,363 m)
- Blue Lake, 44°49′14″N 111°46′24″W, el. 8,599 feet (2,621 m)
- Blue Paradise Lake, 44°56′31″N 111°26′27″W, el. 9,429 feet (2,874 m)
- Branham Lakes, 45°31′00″N 111°59′33″W, el. 8,796 feet (2,681 m)
- Brannan Lakes, 45°36′27″N 112°06′05″W, el. 9,245 feet (2,818 m)
- Cataract Lake, 45°38′33″N 111°56′28″W, el. 6,348 feet (1,935 m)
- Cataract Lake, 44°55′41″N 111°26′17″W, el. 9,301 feet (2,835 m)
- Cherry Lake, 45°25′55″N 111°31′33″W, el. 8,556 feet (2,608 m)
- Cherry Lakes, 45°06′08″N 111°50′14″W, el. 7,556 feet (2,303 m)
- Chilled Lakes, 45°22′25″N 111°22′47″W, el. 9,564 feet (2,915 m)
- Chiquita Lake, 45°24′01″N 111°29′50″W, el. 8,786 feet (2,678 m)
- Cirque Lake, 45°11′17″N 111°57′10″W, el. 8,596 feet (2,620 m)
- Clear Lake, 44°55′59″N 111°26′40″W, el. 9,511 feet (2,899 m)
- Cliff Lake, 44°46′24″N 111°33′10″W, el. 6,316 feet (1,925 m)
- Cliff Lake, 45°29′39″N 111°57′05″W, el. 8,943 feet (2,726 m)
- Comet Lake, 44°56′39″N 111°26′51″W, el. 9,714 feet (2,961 m)
- Coney Lake, 44°57′37″N 111°29′22″W, el. 9,596 feet (2,925 m)
- Cradle Lakes, 44°52′56″N 111°27′13″W, el. 9,747 feet (2,971 m)
- Crag Lake, 44°57′28″N 111°26′37″W, el. 9,541 feet (2,908 m)
- Crockett Lake, 45°07′03″N 111°52′49″W, el. 8,182 feet (2,494 m)
- Crystal Lake, 45°34′59″N 112°07′02″W, el. 8,520 feet (2,600 m)
- Curly Lake, 45°37′36″N 112°04′57″W, el. 8,586 feet (2,617 m)
- Dead Lakes, 44°56′52″N 111°26′21″W, el. 9,232 feet (2,814 m)
- Deep Lake, 45°36′22″N 111°59′24″W, el. 8,625 feet (2,629 m)
- Diamond Lake, 45°23′45″N 111°22′05″W, el. 8,904 feet (2,714 m)
- Dome Lake, 44°52′41″N 111°24′53″W, el. 8,950 feet (2,730 m)
- Dry Lake, 45°47′10″N 112°02′25″W, el. 5,964 feet (1,818 m)
- Dude Lake, 44°59′34″N 111°24′20″W, el. 8,550 feet (2,610 m)
- Dutchman Lake, 44°55′31″N 111°28′15″W, el. 9,629 feet (2,935 m)
- Earthquake Lake, 44°49′45″N 111°25′33″W, el. 6,450 feet (1,970 m)
- Echo Lake, 44°56′49″N 111°28′36″W, el. 9,701 feet (2,957 m)
- Ennis Lake, 45°25′52″N 111°40′48″W, el. 4,819 feet (1,469 m)
- Expedition Lake, 44°57′34″N 111°26′52″W, el. 9,593 feet (2,924 m)
- Fault Lake, 44°48′42″N 111°51′57″W, el. 9,140 feet (2,790 m)
- Finger Lake, 44°58′26″N 111°29′41″W, el. 9,301 feet (2,835 m)
- Freezeout Lakes, 44°49′25″N 111°38′57″W, el. 7,356 feet (2,242 m)
- Globe Lake, 45°36′20″N 112°05′27″W, el. 8,796 feet (2,681 m)
- Gneiss Lake, 45°30′58″N 112°00′43″W, el. 9,554 feet (2,912 m)
- Gnome Lake, 44°55′48″N 111°26′10″W, el. 9,193 feet (2,802 m)
- Goose Lake, 44°43′52″N 111°35′10″W, el. 6,565 feet (2,001 m)
- Granite Lake, 45°33′35″N 112°01′53″W, el. 8,953 feet (2,729 m)
- Grassy Lake, 45°14′30″N 111°52′56″W, el. 7,224 feet (2,202 m)
- Haypress Lakes, 45°11′05″N 111°51′08″W, el. 6,972 feet (2,125 m)
- Heart Lake, 45°14′05″N 111°52′25″W, el. 7,192 feet (2,192 m)
- Hermit Lake, 45°22′59″N 111°26′18″W, el. 8,553 feet (2,607 m)
- Hidden Lake, 44°43′11″N 111°35′42″W, el. 6,598 feet (2,011 m)
- High Hope Lake, 44°52′57″N 111°26′19″W, el. 9,193 feet (2,802 m)
- Hilgard Lake, 44°55′44″N 111°26′49″W, el. 9,590 feet (2,920 m)
- Hollow Top Lake, 45°36′12″N 111°59′03″W, el. 8,543 feet (2,604 m)
- Jackson Lake, 45°34′55″N 112°06′03″W, el. 8,724 feet (2,659 m)
- Jerome Rock Lakes, 45°23′28″N 111°28′08″W, el. 8,996 feet (2,742 m)
- Kid Lake, 45°29′16″N 111°55′59″W, el. 8,425 feet (2,568 m)
- Lake Cameron, 45°12′51″N 111°33′15″W, el. 8,947 feet (2,727 m)
- Lake Eglise, 44°54′30″N 111°27′05″W, el. 9,990 feet (3,040 m)
- Lake Ha Hand, 44°57′09″N 111°26′49″W, el. 9,468 feet (2,886 m)
- Lake Levinsky, 45°17′16″N 111°23′41″W, el. 7,424 feet (2,263 m)
- Lake Solitude, 45°22′38″N 111°26′31″W, el. 8,920 feet (2,720 m)
- Lightning Lake, 44°58′57″N 111°22′08″W, el. 8,563 feet (2,610 m)
- Little Brother Lake, 45°24′21″N 111°28′25″W, el. 8,694 feet (2,650 m)
- Little Pine Lakes, 44°57′01″N 111°26′31″W, el. 9,199 feet (2,804 m)
- Little Sister Lake, 45°24′14″N 111°28′18″W, el. 8,829 feet (2,691 m)
- Lizard Lakes, 45°07′33″N 111°22′13″W, el. 8,717 feet (2,657 m)
- Lone Acre Lake, 45°27′07″N 111°33′32″W, el. 7,874 feet (2,400 m)
- Lost Cabin Lake, 45°34′23″N 112°03′47″W, el. 9,062 feet (2,762 m)
- Lost Lake, 45°18′20″N 111°28′35″W, el. 7,434 feet (2,266 m)
- Louise Lake, 45°35′47″N 112°02′51″W, el. 8,865 feet (2,702 m)
- Lower Boulder Lake, 45°36′30″N 112°07′42″W, el. 8,497 feet (2,590 m)
- Lower Falls Creek Lake, 45°23′58″N 111°27′49″W, el. 8,589 feet (2,618 m)
- Macaroni Lake, 45°32′11″N 112°02′45″W, el. 8,356 feet (2,547 m)
- Marcheta Lake, 45°23′52″N 111°29′17″W, el. 9,104 feet (2,775 m)
- Margo Lake, 45°23′46″N 111°27′03″W, el. 8,592 feet (2,619 m)
- McKelvey Lake, 45°29′40″N 111°56′31″W, el. 8,783 feet (2,677 m)
- Mine Lake, 45°29′57″N 111°56′51″W, el. 8,927 feet (2,721 m)
- Mirror Lake, 45°22′23″N 111°23′51″W, el. 8,333 feet (2,540 m)
- Moose Lake, 45°01′32″N 111°54′22″W, el. 7,388 feet (2,252 m)
- Mud Lake, 45°33′40″N 112°07′46″W, el. 8,084 feet (2,464 m)
- Noble Lake, 45°33′49″N 112°04′24″W, el. 9,025 feet (2,751 m)
- Otter Lake, 44°44′04″N 111°35′01″W, el. 6,519 feet (1,987 m)
- Oval Lake, 45°32′05″N 112°01′52″W, el. 8,993 feet (2,741 m)
- Painted Lake, 44°55′41″N 111°26′26″W, el. 9,317 feet (2,840 m)
- Rainbow Lakes, 45°04′01″N 111°31′09″W, el. 9,347 feet (2,849 m)
- Ramona Lake, 44°54′29″N 111°24′50″W, el. 9,068 feet (2,764 m)
- Red Lake, 44°58′02″N 111°52′14″W, el. 9,285 feet (2,830 m)
- Reservoir Lake, 45°14′02″N 111°52′25″W, el. 7,192 feet (2,192 m)
- Rock Creek Lake, 45°41′31″N 112°03′21″W, el. 7,644 feet (2,330 m)
- Romy Lake, 45°07′05″N 111°55′54″W, el. 6,903 feet (2,104 m)
- Rossiter Lake, 45°33′23″N 112°02′39″W, el. 8,793 feet (2,680 m)
- Sailor Lake, 45°36′10″N 112°05′47″W, el. 8,865 feet (2,702 m)
- Second Lower Falls Creek Lake, 45°23′45″N 111°28′07″W, el. 8,809 feet (2,685 m)
- Secret Lakes, 44°52′36″N 111°37′31″W, el. 6,804 feet (2,074 m)
- Sedge Lake, 44°54′30″N 111°24′30″W, el. 8,651 feet (2,637 m)
- Shadow Lake, 45°18′14″N 111°29′08″W, el. 7,126 feet (2,172 m)
- Sheep Lake, 44°46′13″N 111°22′56″W, el. 9,075 feet (2,766 m)
- Skytop Lake, 45°36′28″N 111°59′39″W, el. 8,865 feet (2,702 m)
- Smith Lake, 44°50′51″N 111°34′50″W, el. 6,063 feet (1,848 m)
- Snake Lake, 45°01′46″N 111°29′33″W, el. 9,426 feet (2,873 m)
- South Meadow Creek Lake, 45°27′25″N 111°55′39″W, el. 8,661 feet (2,640 m)
- Spanish Lakes, 45°21′38″N 111°25′18″W, el. 8,940 feet (2,720 m)
- Speck Lake, 44°54′23″N 111°25′13″W, el. 9,311 feet (2,838 m)
- Summit Lake, 45°21′40″N 111°22′47″W, el. 9,573 feet (2,918 m)
- Sunset Lake, 44°56′57″N 111°27′18″W, el. 9,875 feet (3,010 m)
- Sureshot Lake, 45°32′42″N 111°54′08″W, el. 7,185 feet (2,190 m)
- Swan Lake, 45°02′55″N 111°55′08″W, el. 6,985 feet (2,129 m)
- Tallus Lake, 44°55′54″N 111°26′42″W, el. 9,514 feet (2,900 m)
- Talus Lake, 45°11′19″N 111°56′18″W, el. 8,415 feet (2,565 m)
- Thunderbolt Lake, 44°57′12″N 111°27′16″W, el. 9,760 feet (2,970 m)
- Triangle Lake, 45°31′56″N 112°01′47″W, el. 9,081 feet (2,768 m)
- Triple Lakes, 44°52′50″N 111°26′00″W, el. 8,989 feet (2,740 m)
- Trudau Lake, 45°14′05″N 112°08′03″W, el. 5,643 feet (1,720 m)
- Twin Lakes, 45°14′20″N 111°51′53″W, el. 6,909 feet (2,106 m)
- Twin Lakes, 45°30′44″N 111°56′18″W, el. 8,274 feet (2,522 m)
- Twin Lakes, 45°34′55″N 112°05′18″W, el. 9,212 feet (2,808 m)
- Ulerys Lakes, 45°18′24″N 111°25′08″W, el. 7,631 feet (2,326 m)
- Upper Boulder Lake, 45°36′04″N 112°07′09″W, el. 8,947 feet (2,727 m)
- Upper Falls Creek Lake, 45°23′31″N 111°27′11″W, el. 8,740 feet (2,660 m)
- Upper Mason Lake, 45°37′14″N 111°59′47″W, el. 8,707 feet (2,654 m)
- Upper Sureshot Lake, 45°32′53″N 111°54′46″W, el. 7,303 feet (2,226 m)
- Wade Lake, 44°48′48″N 111°34′13″W, el. 6,220 feet (1,900 m)
- Wall Creek Lake, 44°58′30″N 111°46′27″W, el. 9,032 feet (2,753 m)
- Yellow Bear Lake, 44°55′58″N 112°06′33″W, el. 7,625 feet (2,324 m)

== Reservoirs ==
- Albro Lake, 45°35′39″N 111°58′06″W, el. 8,829 feet (2,691 m)
- Bell Lake, 45°32′15″N 112°00′15″W, el. 8,743 feet (2,665 m)
- Bismark Reservoir, 45°36′32″N 112°03′11″W, el. 7,562 feet (2,305 m)
- Call Road Reservoir, 45°08′01″N 111°51′29″W, el. 7,831 feet (2,387 m)
- Camp Creek Reservoir, 45°35′58″N 111°52′50″W, el. 6,959 feet (2,121 m)
- Camp Reservoir, 45°35′58″N 111°52′52″W, el. 6,962 feet (2,122 m)
- Cedar Lake, 45°14′10″N 111°31′07″W, el. 9,504 feet (2,897 m)
- Deep Lake, 45°36′18″N 111°59′03″W, el. 8,543 feet (2,604 m)
- Doubtful Reservoir, 45°08′22″N 111°50′18″W, el. 7,595 feet (2,315 m)
- Durham Reservoir, 45°29′39″N 112°08′43″W, el. 6,447 feet (1,965 m)
- Hill Reservoir, 45°32′27″N 112°02′22″W, el. 8,606 feet (2,623 m)
- Jackson Lake, 45°34′54″N 112°01′09″W, el. 9,813 feet (2,991 m)
- Kelly Reservoir, 44°57′48″N 111°46′15″W, el. 9,045 feet (2,757 m)
- Lake Ennis, 45°28′12″N 111°39′15″W, el. 5,531 feet (1,686 m)
- Lower Branham Lake, 45°30′48″N 111°59′33″W, el. 8,766 feet (2,672 m)
- Mason Lake, 45°37′39″N 111°59′34″W, el. 8,284 feet (2,525 m)
- Miller Reservoir, 45°39′09″N 112°16′36″W, el. 4,632 feet (1,412 m)
- Nelson Reservoir, 45°38′44″N 112°17′07″W, el. 4,619 feet (1,408 m)
- No Man Lake, 45°04′12″N 111°29′28″W, el. 9,193 feet (2,802 m)
- Noble Lake, 45°34′42″N 112°04′27″W, el. 8,878 feet (2,706 m)
- Ruby River Reservoir, 45°14′22″N 112°06′39″W, el. 5,387 feet (1,642 m)
- Smith Reservoir, 45°35′25″N 112°13′08″W, el. 5,695 feet (1,736 m)
- South Meadow Lake, 45°27′18″N 111°55′15″W, el. 8,648 feet (2,636 m)
- Sunrise Lake, 45°34′37″N 112°05′20″W, el. 9,340 feet (2,850 m)
- Tate Reservoir, 45°00′42″N 111°56′05″W, el. 7,392 feet (2,253 m)
- Thompson Reservoir, 45°31′19″N 112°01′24″W, el. 8,953 feet (2,729 m)
- Upper Branham Lake, 45°31′00″N 111°59′33″W, el. 8,796 feet (2,681 m)
- Willow Creek Reservoir, 45°42′49″N 111°42′02″W, el. 4,731 feet (1,442 m)
- Ziegler Reservoir, 45°34′40″N 112°06′29″W, el. 8,356 feet (2,547 m)

== See also ==
- List of lakes in Montana
