= Clearlake =

Clearlake may refer to:

- Clearlake (band), an English rock band
- Clearlake, California, a city in Lake County, California
- Clearlake Oaks, California, a census-designated place in Lake County, California
- Angels Camp, California, formerly Clearlake

== See also ==
- Clear Lake (disambiguation)
