= Rebecca Spit Marine Provincial Park =

Provincial park in British Columbia, Canada

- IUCN category II (national park)
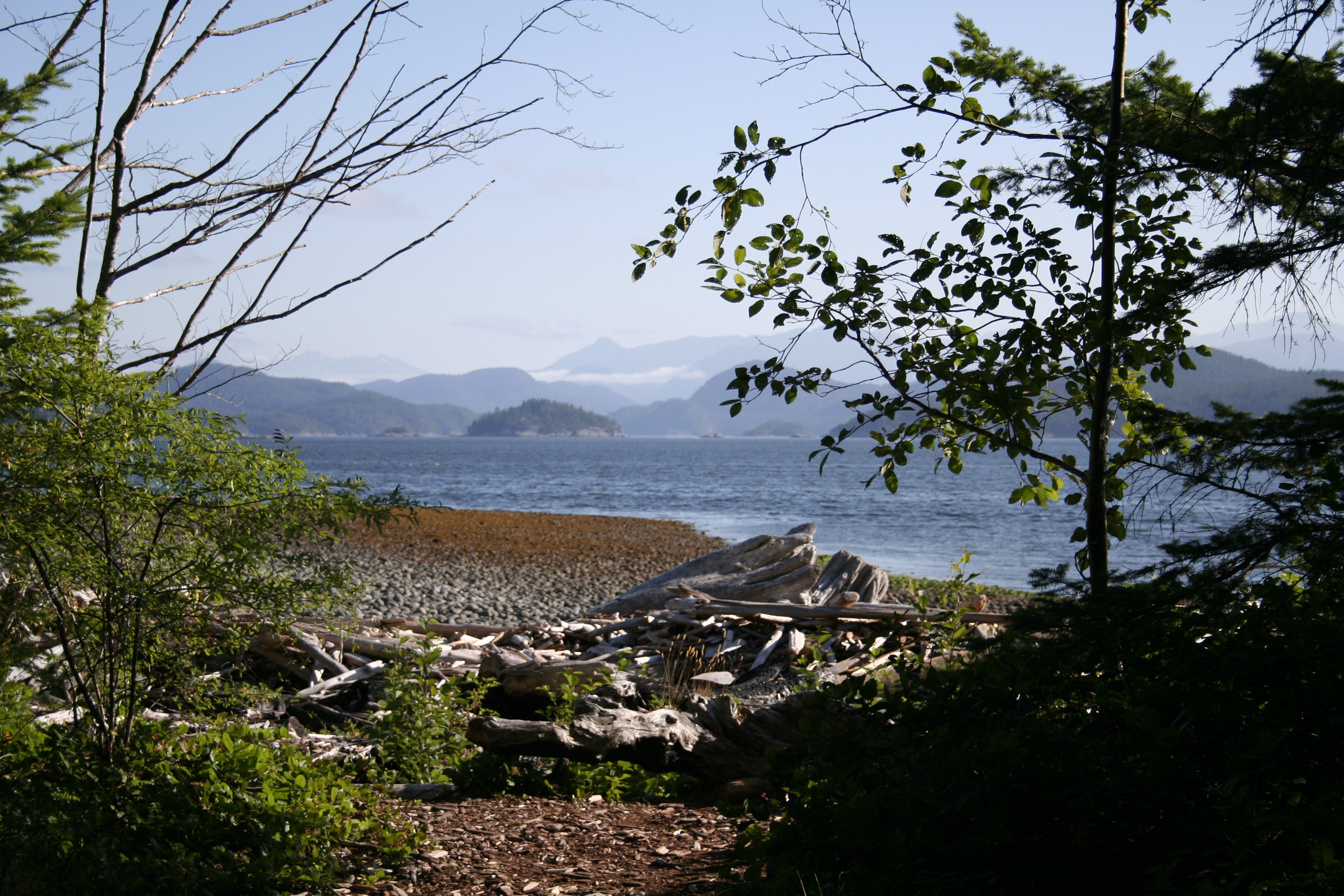
- Panoramic view

- Location within Vancouver Island Location within British Columbia
- Interactive map of Rebecca Spit Marine Provincial Park
- Location: British Columbia, Canada
- Nearest city: Campbell River
- Coordinates: 50°06′05″N 125°11′18″W
- Area: 1.77 km^{2} (0.68 sq mi)
- Established: July 7, 1959
- Governing body: BC Parks
- Website: bcparks.ca/rebecca-spit-marine-park/

Rebecca Spit Marine Provincial Park is a provincial park in British Columbia, Canada, located on the east side of Quadra Island, near the city of Campbell River.
