= Quadra Island =

Island in British Columbia, Canada

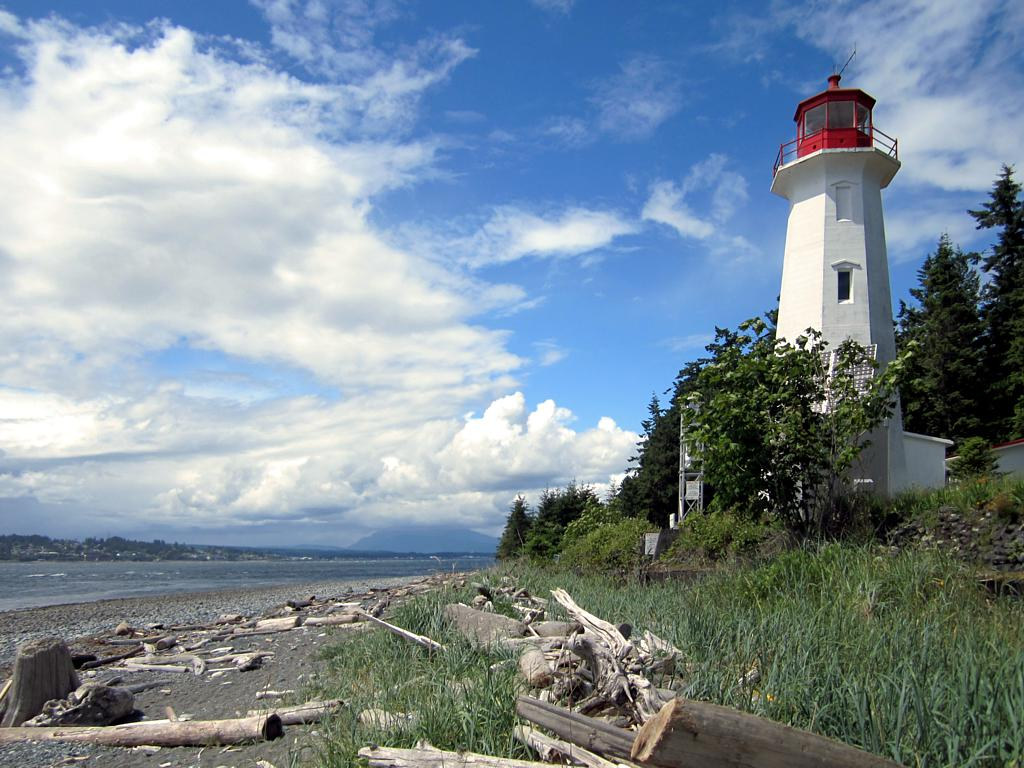
- Cape Mudge Lighthouse on Quadra Island

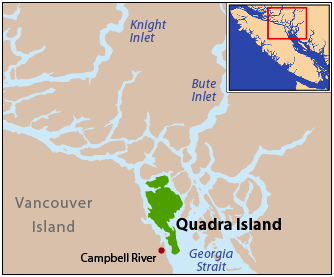
- Quadra Island is located at the northern end of the Strait of Georgia

Geography
- Location: Salish Sea
- Coordinates: 50°10′N 125°14′W
- Archipelago: Discovery Islands
- Area: 310 km^{2} (120 sq mi)
- Highest elevation: 620 m (2030 ft)
- Highest point: Mount Seymour

Administration
- Canada
- Province: British Columbia
- Regional district: Strathcona

Demographics
- Population: 2,472 (2006)
- Ethnic groups: Laich-kwil-tach

Quadra Island is a large island off the eastern coast of Vancouver Island, in British Columbia, Canada. It is part of the Discovery Islands, in the Strathcona Regional District.

== Etymology ==
In 1903, the island was named after the Peruvian Spanish navigator Juan Francisco de la Bodega y Quadra, who explored and settled the Vancouver Island area in the late 18th century.

== History ==
The island was claimed by the Peruvian Spanish navigator Juan Francisco de la Bodega y Quadra for the Spanish Empire in the 1700s. A settlement was not successfully negotiated and ownership of the island remained in dispute between Britain and Spain in the early 1790s. The two countries nearly began a war over the issue; the confrontation became known as the Nootka Crisis. That was averted when both agreed to recognize the other's rights to the area in the first Nootka Convention in 1790, a first step to peace. Finally, the two countries signed the second Nootka Convention in 1793 and the third Convention in 1794. As per the final treaty, the Spanish dismantled their fort on Vancouver Island and left the area after both countries agreed that neither Spain nor Britain should establish permanent settlements in the area, while rights of trade and shipping were to be shared by the two powers.

In 1846, the Oregon Treaty was signed by the British and the U.S. to settle the question of the U.S. Oregon Territory borders. The treaty made the 49th parallel latitude north the official border between the two countries. In order to ensure that Britain retained all of Vancouver Island and the Gulf Islands, it was agreed that the border would swing south around that area.

The Coast Salish inhabited Quadra Island when Captain George Vancouver visited and wrote about their village at Cape Mudge in 1792; he described long houses, boats and a population of roughly 300 people. The Salish were driven out by other First Nations in the late 1800s.

B.C. historian Jeanette Taylor states that "the We-Wai-Kai, with roots to the north among the Kwakwaka’wakw, took over the island through a complex process of both warfare and intermarriage". They fished for salmon year-round. The We-Wai-Kai band of the Kwagiulth live in Cape Mudge today. According to the historian, they "were prohibited from buying alcohol and barred by the government from the mechanized fishing fleet until 1926. Even their ceremonial gatherings – potlatches – were made illegal". In 1922, after mass arrests, the We-Wai-Kai people surrendered their masks and regalia to the government. The property was not returned to them for some 50 years, to the Nuuyumbalees Cultural Centre.

The first school was built by the Kwagiulth people at Cape Mudge in 1893; the fishing fleet in operation at that time is still successful today. A copper and gold mine, the Lucky Jim, opened in 1903 but was destroyed by fire in 1941. In 1904, the island had "two post offices, a school, hotel, lumber camps, mills, and a mission", according to one report. A passenger ferry commenced service in 1949 and a ferry for vehicles started in 1960.

By 1904, Quadra had two post offices, a school, hotel, lumber camps, mills, and a mission. Severe fires devastated Quadra over the years leading to a poor economy well into the 1930s.

== Geography ==
Quadra Island is separated from Vancouver Island by Discovery Passage, and from Cortes Island by Read Island and the Sutil Channel, and is linked to that island by a ferry from Heriot Bay on its eastern shore. The island has many beaches, trails, lakes, and parks. Main Lake Provincial Park is located on the northern part of the island, and Rebecca Spit Marine Provincial Park is on the eastern shore, near Heriot Bay.

Quadra Island is about 35 kilometres (22 miles) from its northernmost point to its southernmost point. The island at its narrowest point, on its southern peninsula, is less than 2 km (1.24 mi) wide, and at its widest point, about 15 km (9 mi) wide. With an area of 310 square kilometres (120 square miles), Quadra Island is the largest island of the Discovery Islands and the second largest island in the Salish Sea after Whidbey Island in Washington.

=== Geology ===
Few of the island's soils are well suited to agriculture. Most are coarse and, outside of poorly drained areas, have classic podzol profile development; well-drained podzols are mapped as Kye loamy sand and Quinsam gravelly sandy loam. A small area of dark well-drained unpodzolized soil (Lazo loamy sand) is mapped around the southeast corner. Dashwood gravelly loamy sand, a brown podzolic trending to podzol, is commonly associated with Kye and Quinsam. Imperfectly drained areas have brown podzolic Bowser loamy sand or classic podzol Sayward loamy sand. The more moist Custer loamy sand, a groundwater podzol, is present locally. Poorly drained areas have Arrowsmith peat, Parksville sandy loam, or Tolmie loam (the latter two are gleysols).

In spite of this, many residents maintain productive home gardens, and the island hosts a well attended Garden Club alongside a biennial Quilt and Garden Tour.

== Demographics ==
The population of island and surrounding mainland inlets, as of the 2006 federal census (excluding First Nations Reserves, tallied separately), was 2,472, down from the 2001 federal census count of 2,548. A more recent report (2017) suggest an estimated population of 4,000, with most at the southern end of the island, and states that many are "involved in the arts, fishing, logging, and tourism".

The Cape Mudge Reserve on the southern tip of the island is home to the We Wai Kai, one of the main bands comprising the Southern Kwakiutl (the other being the We Wai Kum based in Campbell River on Vancouver Island). Together they are known as the Laich-kwil-tach (historically known as the Euclataws or Yucultas, names more familiar to speakers of British Columbia English).

=== Education ===
There is an elementary school on the island. School children in grades 6-12 travel by ferry to Campbell River to attend École Phoenix Middle School or Carihi Secondary School. These schools are part of School District 72 Campbell River.

== Culture ==
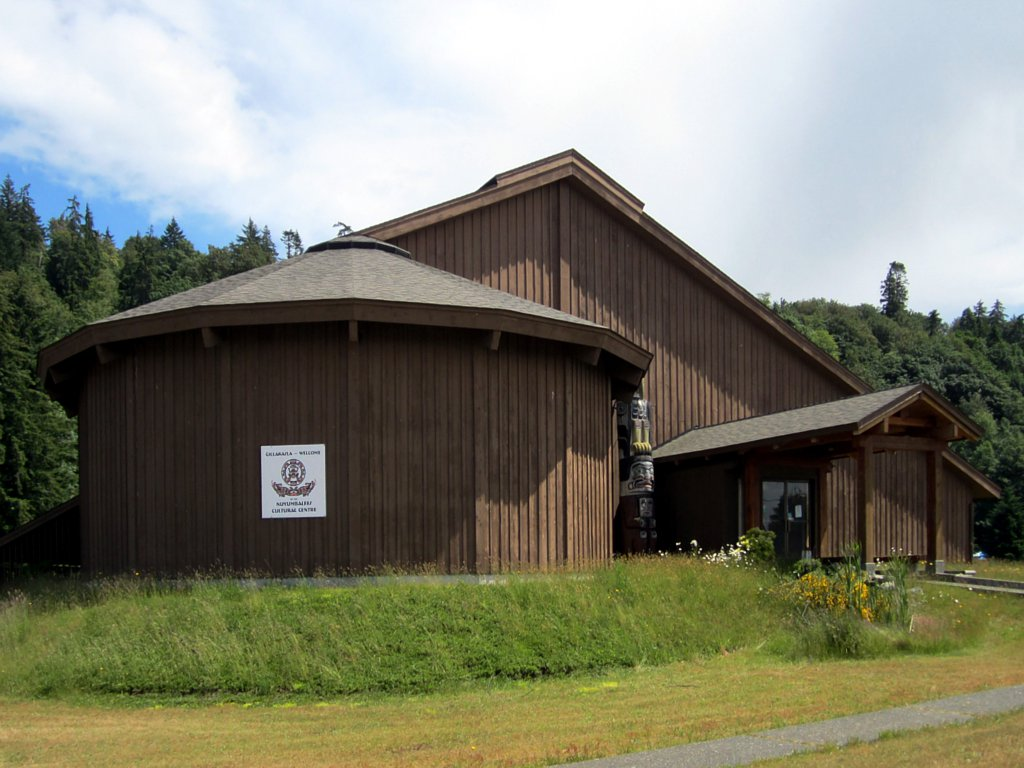
Nuyumbalees Cultural Centre

The Nuyumabalees Cultural Centre is located within the Cape Mudge Village. The Centre opened in 1987 to hold the Sacred Potlatch Collection which was returned by the Federal Government. The Centre continues its efforts in "researching, locating and repatriating potlatch artifacts" from other sources around the world, according to a local report.

The Southern Kwakiutl (part of the larger Kwakwaka'wakw ethnic grouping) migrated into the northern Georgia Strait from Queen Charlotte Strait over two centuries ago, displacing and absorbing the Comox and Pentlatch peoples who lived there.

A recent report about Cape Mudge Village (Yaculta) states that "the territory of the Kwa'Kwa'Ka' Wa'Kw Nation includes territory between a line running from Cape Mudge, Quadra Island to the mouth of Bute Inlet northward to Smith Inlet and around Vancouver Island to Quatsino Sound". The report adds that today, the We Wai Kai band of the Laichwiltach People "are a prosperous people involved with several major concerns in nearby Campbell River and on Quadra Island ... [they operate] a full service resort Tsa-Kwa-Luten Lodge & RV Park". The other two main villages are Quathiaski Cove, the island's commercial hub, and Heriot Bay a picturesque community.

== Transportation ==
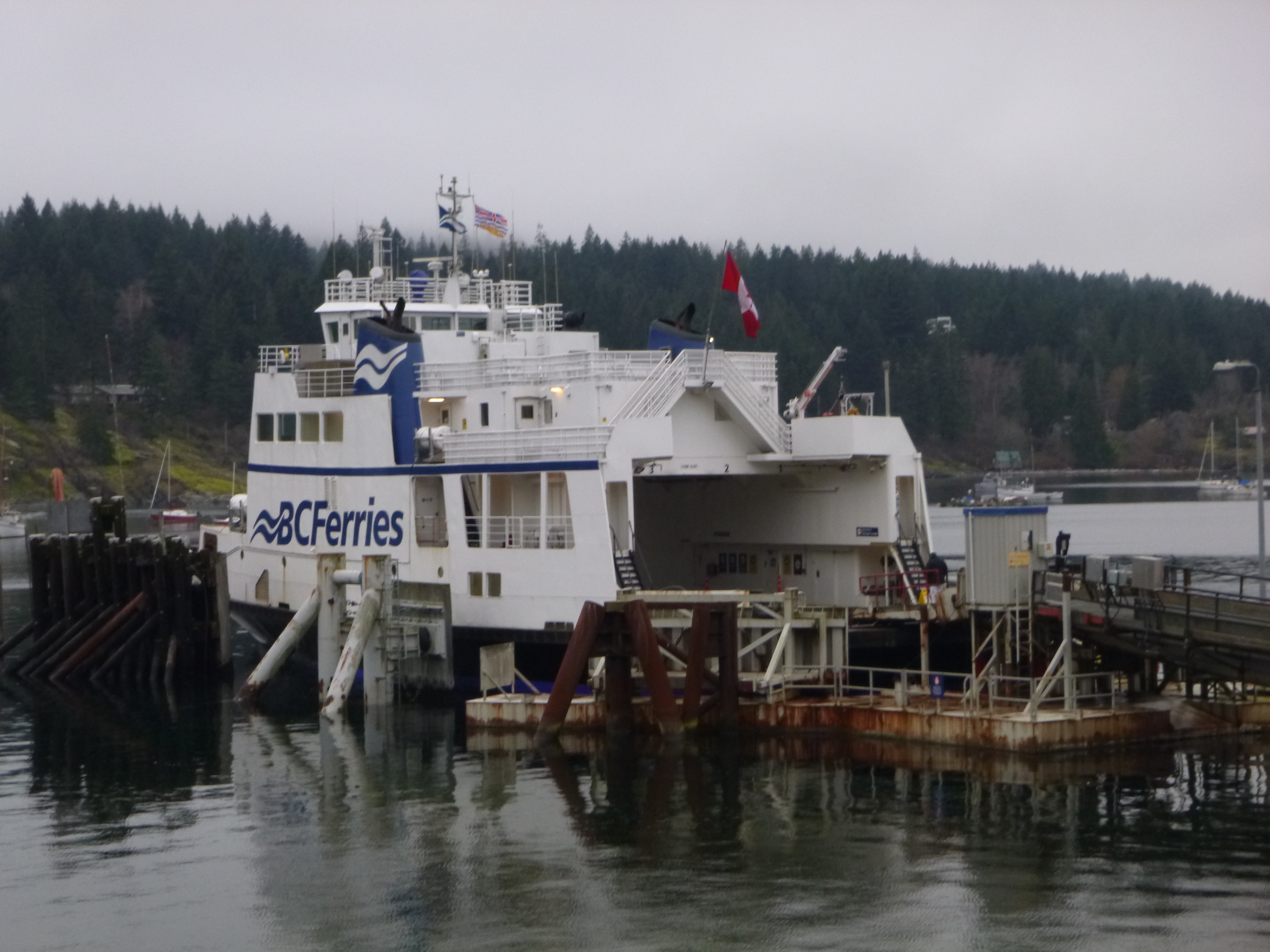
The BCFerry Tachek docked at Heriot Bay (2015)

The BC Ferry terminal is located at Quathiaski Cove on the island, connecting to Campbell River on Vancouver Island. Each day, the ferry makes 18 round trips. Taxi service is available on the island. Flights from Vancouver stop at Campbell River and District Airport (YBL).

Many services are available at nearby Campbell River but Quadra has some too, according to the Discovery Island publication: a bank, ATMs, auto and marine repair services, a gas station (without automotive diesel), marine gas and diesel, cafes, restaurants, library, medical clinic, pharmacy, book store, groceries, an elementary school, childcare, RCMP detachment, real estate agents, hardware store, adventure tour operators and more.

== Notable people ==
- Hilary Stewart was a writer who lived here for 35 years writing about local history.
- Ryan Guldemond - musician, lead singer of the indie rock band Mother Mother.
- Jan Zwicky - philosopher, poet
- Robert Bringhurst - poet, typographer, linguist

== See also ==
- Seymour Narrows
