= Twin Lakes (Madison County, Montana) =

Lakes in Madison County, Montana, United States

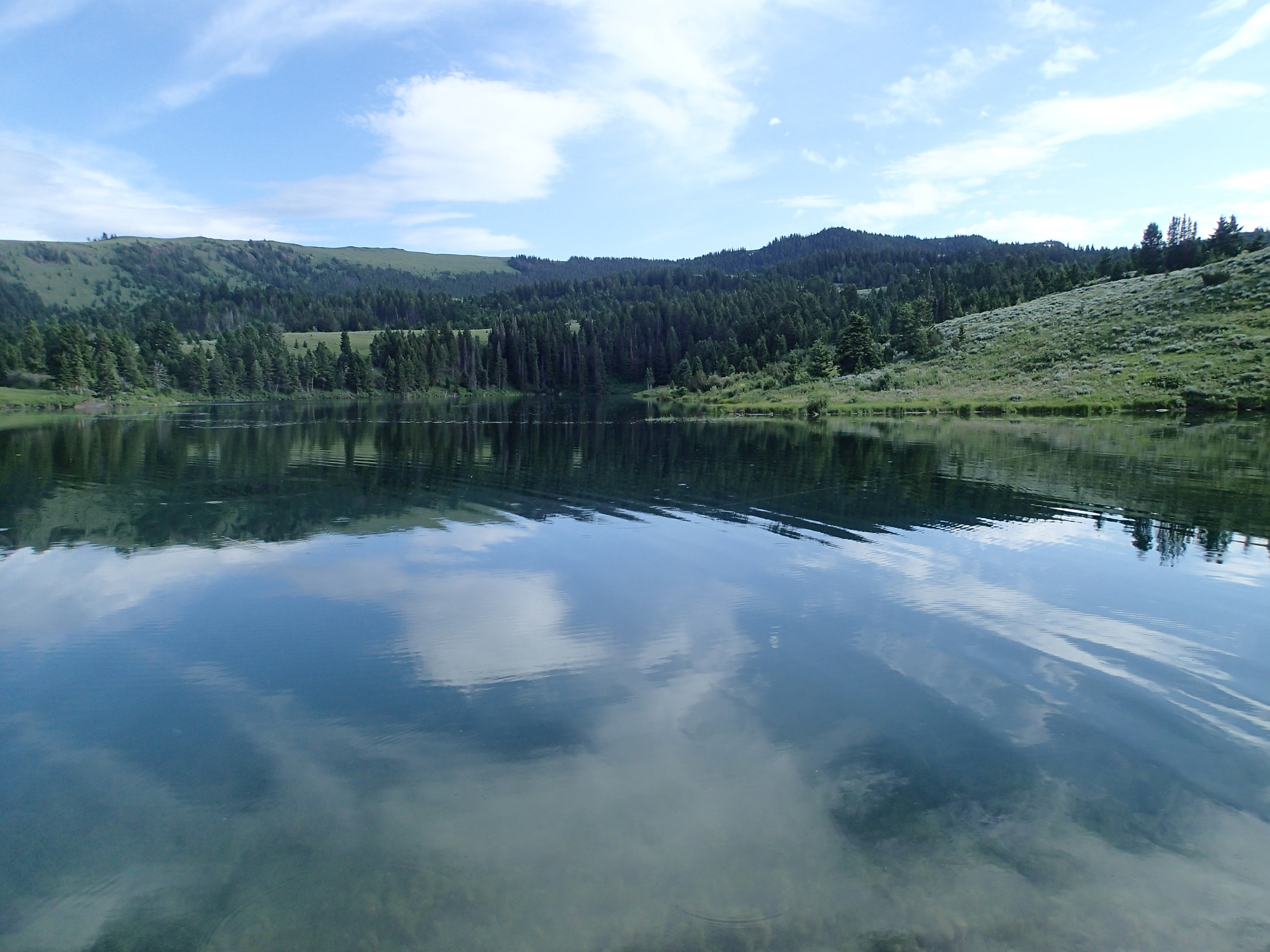
- Lower Twin Lakes

- Location within Montana Location within the United States
- Location: Madison County, Montana
- Coordinates: 45°14′20″N 111°51′53″W
- Surface elevation: 6,909 feet (2,106 m)

Twin Lakes are a pair of small sub-alpine lakes in the Axolotl Lakes group in the Greenhorn Range southwest of Ennis, Montana. Lower Twin Lakes is approximately 11 acres (4.5 ha). Upper Twin Lakes is considerably smaller and located approximately .25 miles (0.40 km) southwest of the lower lake. Twin Lakes is located on state owned land and accessible by a one-lane dirt road (Axolotl Lakes Road) connecting Montana Highway 287 and the Gravelly Range road.

Twin Lakes contain rainbow trout stocked by the Montana Department of Fish, Wildlife and Parks.

== See also ==
- List of lakes in Madison County, Montana
