= Clear Lake (Canada) =

Clear Lake is the name of several lakes in Canada:

== Alberta ==
- Clear Lake (County of Barrhead No. 11, Alberta)
- Clear Lake (Starland County, Alberta)
- Clear Lake (Municipal District of Wainwright No. 61, Alberta)
- Clear Lake (Municipal District of Willow Creek No. 26, Alberta)
- Clear Lake (Wood Buffalo Regional Municipality, Alberta)

== British Columbia ==
- Clear Lake (Cariboo Regional District, British Columbia)
- Clear Lake (Fraser-Fort George, Regional District, British Columbia)
- Clear Lake (Kootenay Boundary Regional District, British Columbia)
- Clear Lake (Quadra Island)

== Ontario ==
- Clear Lake (Huron Shores, Ontario) (Algoma District)
- Clear Lake (Spanish, Ontario) (Algoma District)
- Clear Lake (Bruce County, Ontario)
- Clear Lake (Nansen Township, Ontario) (Cochrane District)
- Clear Lake (Nettleton Township, Ontario) (Cochrane District)
- Clear Lake (O'Brien Township, Ontario) (Cochrane District)
- Clear Lake (Ritchie Township, Ontario) (Cochrane District)
- Clear Lake (Timmins, Ontario) (Cochrane District)
- Clear Lake (Frontenac County, Ontario)
- Clear Lake (Greater Sudbury, Ontario)
- Clear Lake (Algonquin Highlands, Ontario) (Haliburton County)
- Clear Lake (Minden Hills, Ontario) (Haliburton County)
- Clear Lake (Kawartha Lakes, Ontario)
- Clear Lake (Axe River) (Kenora District)
- Clear Lake (Bray) (Kenora District)
- Clear Lake (Kirkup Township, Ontario) (Kenora District)
- Clear Lake (McKellar Lake) (Kenora District)
- Clear Lake (Oslo Lake) (Kenora District)
- Clear Lake (Lanark Highlands, Ontario) (Lanark County)
- Clear Lake (Tay Valley, Ontario) (Lanark County)
- Clear Lake (United Counties of Leeds and Grenville, Ontario)
- Clear Lake (Bracebridge, Ontario) (Muskoka)
- Clear Lake (Muskoka Lakes, Ontario) (Muskoka)
- Clear Lake (Nipissing District, Ontario)
- Clear Lake (Burton Township, Ontario) (Parry Sound District)
- Clear Lake (East Mills Township, Ontario) (Parry Sound District)
- Clear Lake (Foley Township, Ontario) (Parry Sound District)
- Clear Lake (Humphrey Township, Ontario) (Parry Sound District)
- Clear Lake (McKellar, Ontario) (Parry Sound District)
- Clear Lake (Mowat Township, Ontario) (Parry Sound District)
- Clear Lake (Patterson Township, Ontario) (Parry Sound District)
- Clear Lake (Perry, Ontario) (Parry Sound District)
- Clear Lake (The Archipelago, Ontario) (Parry Sound District)
- Clear Lake (Whitestone, Ontario) (Parry Sound District)
- Clear Lake (Wilson Township, Ontario) (Parry Sound District)
- Clear Lake (Peterorough County, Ontario)
- Clear Lake (Laurentian Hills, Ontario) (Renfrew County)
- Clear Lake (Laurentian Valley, Ontario) (Renfrew County)
- Clear Lake (Espanola, Ontario) (Sudbury District)
- Clear Lake (Hess Township, Ontario) (Sudbury District)
- Clear Lake (Bayly Township, Ontario) (Timiskaming District)
- Clear Lake (Coleman, Ontario) (Timiskaming District)

== Manitoba ==
- Clear Lake (Riding Mountain National Park)
- Clear Lake (Rural Municipality of Grahamdale, Manitoba)

== New Brunswick ==
- Clear Lake (Charlotte County, New Brunswick)
- Clear Lake (Saint John County, New Brunswick)
- Clear Lake (Mud Brook) (York County)
- Clear Lake (Stormy Brook) (York County)

== Other provinces ==
- Clear Lake (Saskatchewan)
- Clear Lake (Nova Scotia)
