= Clear Lake, Pierce County, Washington =

- Unincorporated community Census designated place
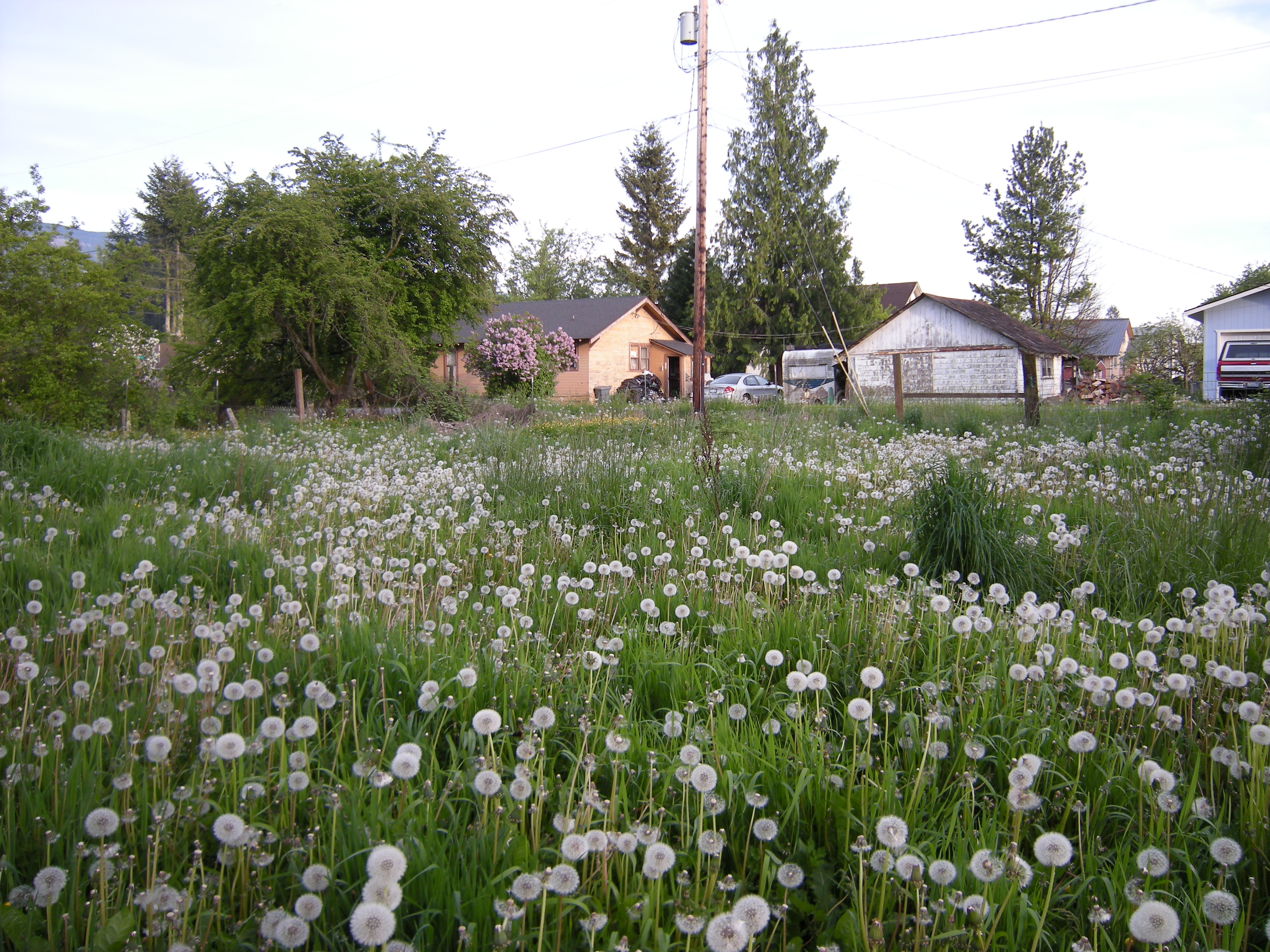
- House in Clear Lake

- Location in the state of Washington
- Coordinates: 46°56′25″N 122°15′50″W
- Country: United States
- State: Washington
- County: Pierce

Area
  - Total: 9.107 sq mi (23.588 km^{2})
  - Land: 8.481 sq mi (21.965 km^{2})
  - Water: 0.627 sq mi (1.623 km^{2}) 6.88%
- Elevation: 879 ft (268 m)

Population (2010)
  - Total: 1,419
- Population as of 2010 U.S. Census
- Time zone: UTC−8 (PST)
  - Summer (DST): UTC−7 (PDT)
- ZIP Code: 98328
- Area codes: 253, 360, 564
- FIPS code: 53-12820
- GNIS feature ID: 2584959

Clear Lake is a census-designated place (CDP) in Pierce County, Washington, north of the town of Eatonville. The population was 1,419 as of the 2010 census. The name comes from that of the lake of the same name located in the middle of the census-designated place.

== Geography ==
According to the United States Census Bureau, the CDP has a total area of 9.11 square miles (23.6 km^{2}), of which, 8.48 square miles (22.0 km^{2}) of it is land and 0.63 square miles (1.6 km^{2}) of it (6.88%) is water.

== Demographics ==
Historical population
Census	Pop.	Note	%±
2010	1,419		—
2020	1,578		11.2%
U.S. Decennial Census; 2000 2010

Clear Lake first appeared as a census designated place in the 2010 U.S. census.

=== Racial and ethnic composition ===
Clear Lake CDP, Washington – Racial and ethnic composition Note: the US Census treats Hispanic/Latino as an ethnic category. This table excludes Latinos from the racial categories and assigns them to a separate category. Hispanics/Latinos may be of any race.
Race / Ethnicity (NH = Non-Hispanic)	Pop 2010	Pop 2020	% 2010	% 2020
White alone (NH)	1,289	1,318	90.84%	83.52%
Black or African American alone (NH)	6	7	0.42%	0.44%
Native American or Alaska Native alone (NH)	10	3	0.70%	0.19%
Asian alone (NH)	11	15	0.78%	0.95%
Native Hawaiian or Pacific Islander alone (NH)	0	0	0.00%	0.00%
Other race alone (NH)	0	8	0.00%	0.51%
Mixed race or Multiracial (NH)	57	120	4.02%	7.60%
Hispanic or Latino (any race)	46	107	3.24%	6.78%
Total	1,419	1,578	100.00%	100.00%

=== 2010 census ===
As of the census of 2010, there were 1,419 people, 522 households, and 391 families residing in the CDP. The population density was 155.8 people per square mile (60.2 people/km^{2}). There were 659 housing units at an average density of 72.4 per square mile (28.0/km^{2}). The racial makeup of the CDP was 92.2% White, 0.4% African American, 0.8% Native American, 0.8% Asian, 0.0% Pacific Islander, 1.7% from other races, and 4.0% from two or more races. Hispanic or Latino of any race were 3.2% of the population.

There were 522 households, out of which 33.7% had children under the age of 18 living with them, 63.8% were married couples living together, 6.3% had a female householder with no husband present, and 25.1% were non-families. 17.6% of all households were made up of individuals, and 6.9% had someone living alone who was 65 years of age or older. The average household size was 2.72 and the average family size was 3.06.

In the CDP, the age distribution of the population shows 23.0% under the age of 18, 7.8% from 18 to 24, 21.4% from 25 to 44, 35.2% from 45 to 64, and 12.6% who were 65 years of age or older. The median age was 43.9 years. For every 100 females, there were 108.4 males. For every 100 females age 18 and over, there were 109.6 males.
