= Clear Lake (Orlando, Florida) =

Lake in the state of Florida, United States

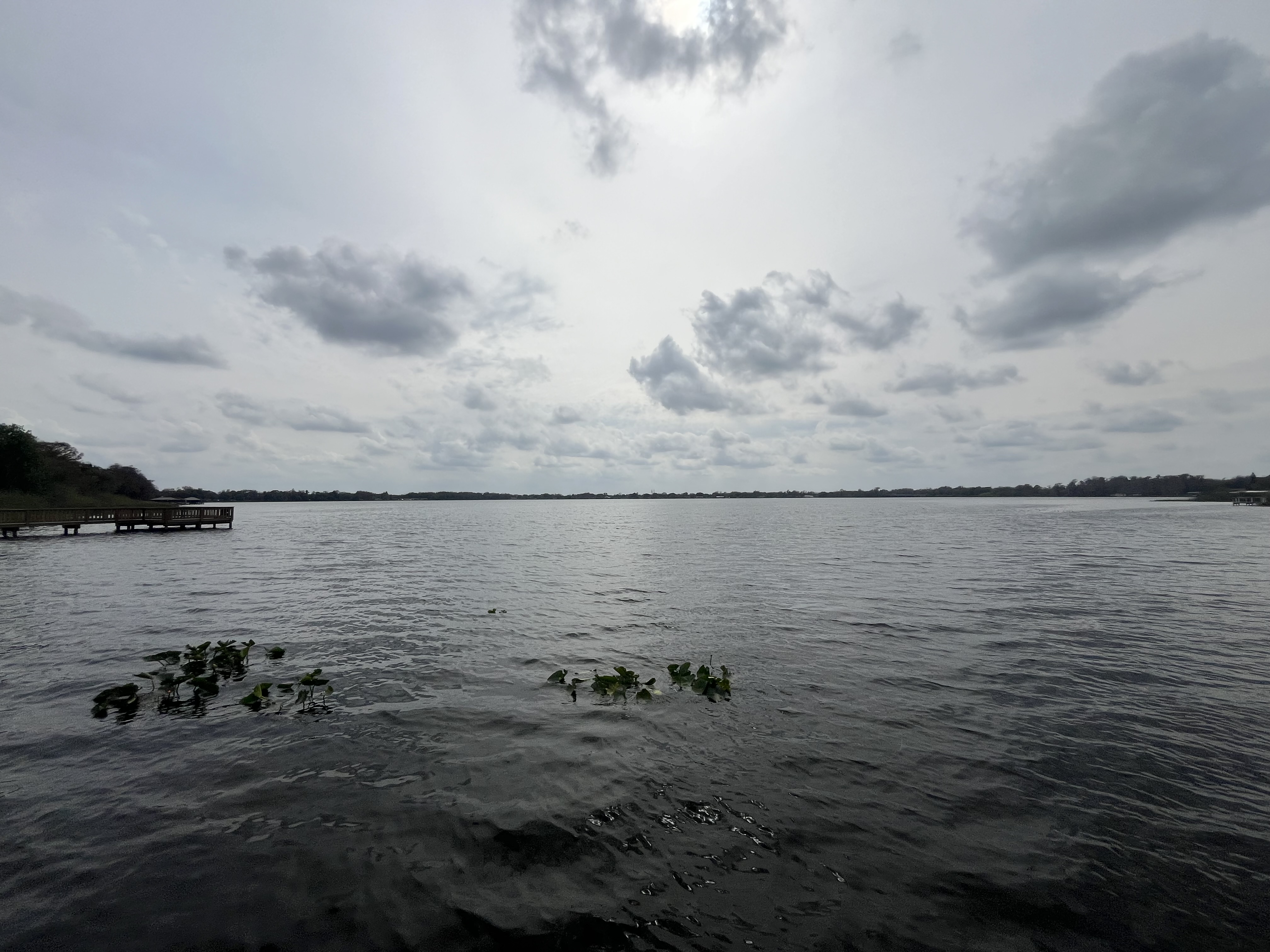

- Location within Florida Location within the United States
- Location: Orlando, Florida
- Coordinates: 28.5219°N 81.4103°W
- Type: natural freshwater lake
- Basin countries: United States
- Max. length: 1.15 miles (1.85 km)
- Max. width: 0.99 miles (1.59 km)
- Surface area: 357 acres (144 ha)
- Average depth: 13.0 ft (4 m)
- Water volume: 1,445,216,256 US gallons (5.47073865×10^{9} L)
- Surface elevation: 42 feet (13 m)

Clear Lake is a 357-acre (1,440,000 m^{2}) freshwater lake located in central Orlando, Florida. This lake, somewhat lemon shaped, is surrounded by a residential area. A series of canals on the lake's southwest provide boat access for the houses there. John Young Parkway borders the lake on part of its west side. A very small portion of John Young Parkway crosses the extreme western part of Clear Lake.

Fishing, walking and boating are popular activities. There are no public swimming areas on the shore of this lake. Three public parks border Clear Lake. On the extreme western edge is Washington Shore Park, which is mainly a park with a track, football field and four softball fields. Another park, Clear Lake Park, is on the southeast edge of the lake. This park has walking trails, a fishing dock and a boardwalk. A third park, George Barker Memorial Park, is on the northeast corner of the lake. A public boat ramp in this park is on a canal leading to Clear Lake. This park also has two fishing piers, playgrounds, a volleyball court and a basketball court.

The Take Me Fishing website says this lake contains largemouth bass, wiper (hybrid striped bass) and bluegill.
