= Clear Lake (Oregon) =

Clear Lake may refer to one of several places in the U.S. state of Oregon:

There are 11 bodies of water listed as of May 28, 2010.

name	type	elevation	coordinate	USGS Map	GNIS ID
Clear Lake (Douglas County, Oregon)	Lake	233 feet (71 m)	43°38′25″N 124°11′13″W	Winchester Bay	1139800
Clear Lake (Wasco County, Oregon)	Reservoir	3,484 feet (1,062 m)	45°10′25″N 121°41′14″W	Wapinitia Pass	1139803
Clear Lake (Amazon Creek, Oregon)	Lake	358 feet (109 m)	44°06′54″N 123°13′53″W	Eugene West	1119000
Clear Lake (Marion County, Oregon)	Lake	112 feet (34 m)	45°01′53″N 123°01′46″W	Mission Bottom	1119001
Clear Lake (Tillamook County, Oregon)	Lake	16 feet (4.9 m)	45°36′21″N 123°56′34″W	Garibaldi	1119002
Clear Lake (Clatsop County, Oregon)	Lake	23 feet (7.0 m)	46°10′21″N 123°56′33″W	Warrenton	1119003
Clear Lake, Oregon	Populated Place	197 feet (60 m)	45°02′07″N 123°01′15″W	Mission Bottom	1119004
Clear Lake (Florence, Lane County, Oregon)	Lake	98 feet (30 m)	44°01′20″N 124°04′48″W	Mercer Lake	1139801
Clear Lake (Clackamas County, Oregon)	Lake	3,875 feet (1,181 m)	45°08′00″N 122°17′22″W	Elwood	1139802
Clear Lake (Wallowa County, Oregon)	Lake	5,269 feet (1,606 m)	45°26′22″N 116°55′46″W	Clear Lake Ridge	1139804
Clear Lake (Linn County, Oregon)	Lake	3,015 feet (919 m)	44°22′03″N 121°59′39″W	Clear Lake	1139805
Clear Lake (Coos County, Oregon)	Lake	36 feet (11 m)	43°32′39″N 124°12′54″W	Lakeside	1154640
Malabon, Oregon	Historic locale	381 feet (116 m)	44°06′03″N 123°14′17″W	Eugene West	1166549

== See also ==
- List of lakes in Oregon
