= Clear Lake (Wasco County, Oregon) =

Lake in Oregon, United States

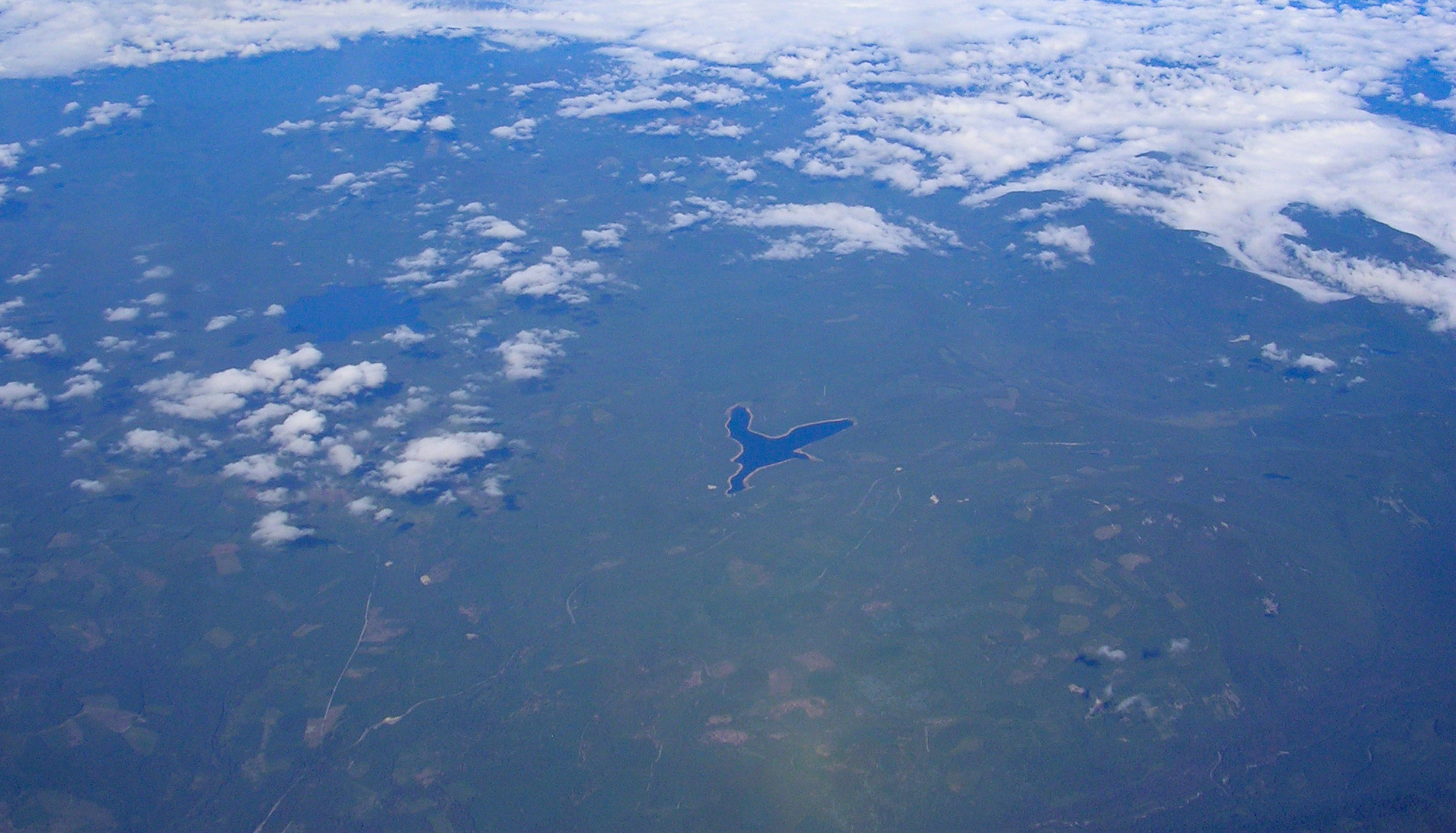
- Clear Lake, Wasco County and Timothy Lake (back left)

- Location of Clear Lake in Oregon, USA. Clear Lake (the United States)
- Location: Wasco County, Oregon, United States
- Coordinates: 45.1805262°N 121.7089251°W
- Basin countries: United States
- Surface elevation: 3,518 ft (1,072 m)
- Islands: (none)
- Settlements: (none)

Clear Lake is a mountain lake 53 miles (85 km) southeast of Portland, Oregon, United States in Mount Hood National Forest. It can be seen from flights in the region as a bird-shaped body of water.

It is 12 miles (19 km) south of Mount Hood and 5 miles (8.0 km) northeast of Timothy Lake, near the junction of U.S. Route 26 and Skyline Road at the latter's northern terminus. It is near the northwest corner of Wasco County. The Pacific Crest Trail is 4 km (2 mi) west of the lake.

It is fed by several small streams of the eastern Cascade crest. It is the headwaters of Clear Creek, a tributary of the White River, blocked at the east end by the Wasco Dam. The earthen dam was a 1959 irrigation project of the United States Bureau of Reclamation, 59 feet high and 1901 feet long at its crest.

Clear Lake Butte is a 4,454 feet (1,358 m) butte 1.3 miles (2.1 km) south of the lake, and defines the northwest corner of Warm Springs Indian Reservation. The lake is known for abundant fish and its windy conditions. The banks are edged by tree stumps and free range cattle tracks. The campground has 28 established spots and an overflow area.

== See also ==
- Clear Lake (Oregon), for other lakes with the name
- List of lakes in Oregon
