= Clear Lake (Meeker County, Minnesota) =

Lake in the state of Minnesota, United States

- Location within Minnesota
- Location: Meeker County, Minnesota
- Coordinates: 45°16′29″N 94°26′43″W
- Type: Lake
- Surface elevation: 1,125 feet (343 m)

Clear Lake is a lake in Meeker County, in the U.S. state of Minnesota.

Clear Lake was named on account of its clear water. Clear Lake is 529 acres and reaches a maximum depth of 18 feet and average 10 feet in depth. The lake generally has cloudy water, which averages around 2 feet in clarity. Eurasian watermilfoil was found in Clear Lake in 2013. Clear Lake is known for its large bullhead and panfish populations and is heavily fished for walleye.

== See also ==
- List of lakes in Minnesota
