= Clear Lake Township =

Clear Lake Township may refer to the following townships in the United States:

- Clear Lake Township, Steuben County, Indiana
- Clear Lake Township, Sangamon County, Illinois
- Clear Lake Township, Cerro Gordo County, Iowa
- Clear Lake Township, Hamilton County, Iowa
- Clear Lake Township, Sherburne County, Minnesota
