= Main Lake Provincial Park =

Provincial park in British Columbia

- IUCN category II (national park)
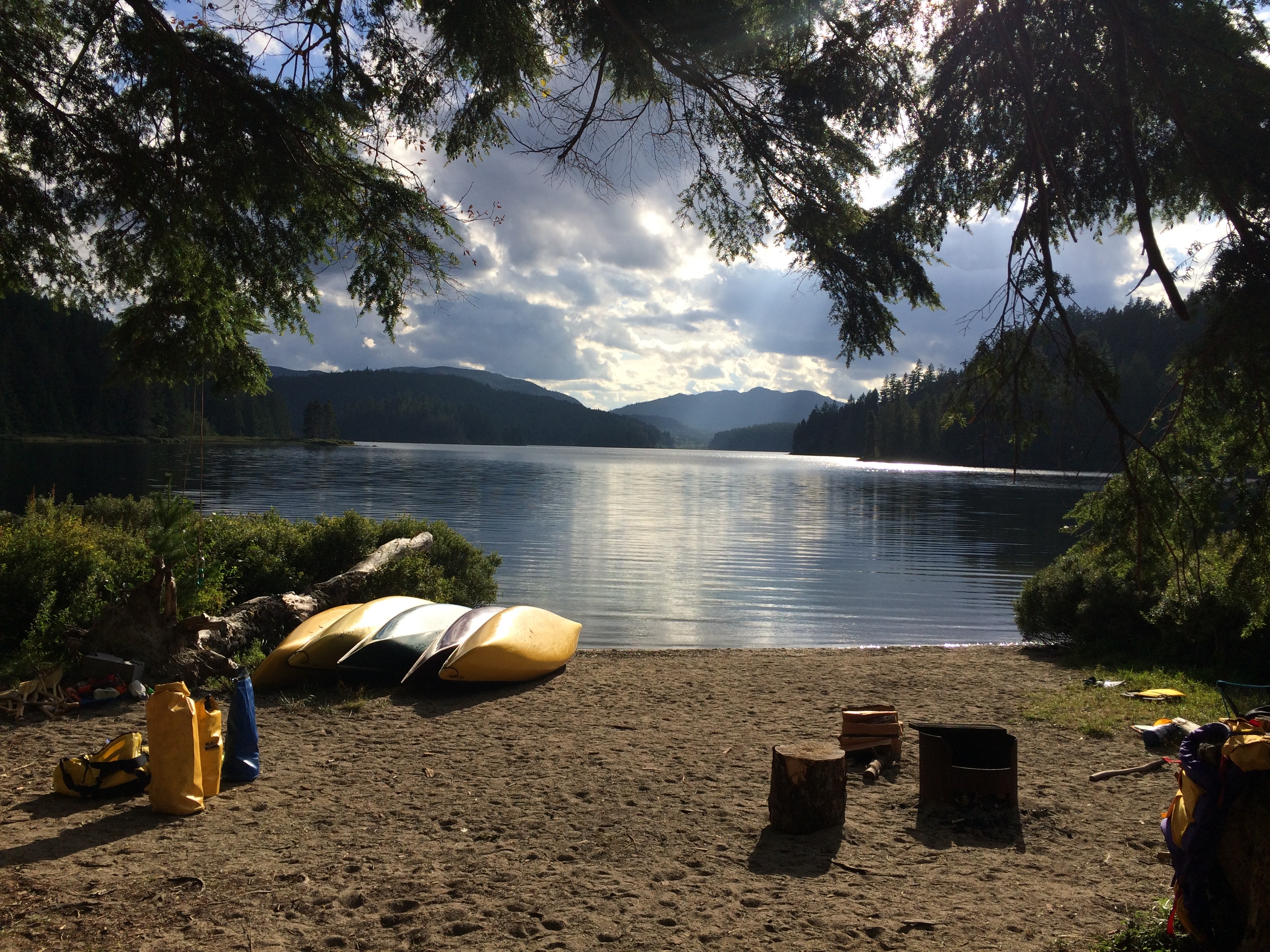
- Beach with canoes at campsite in Main Lake Provincial Park

- Location within Vancouver Island Location within British Columbia
- Interactive map of Main Lake Provincial Park
- Location: Quadra Island, British Columbia, Canada
- Nearest city: Campbell River
- Coordinates: 50°12′39″N 125°12′59″W
- Area: 35.3 km^{2} (13.6 sq mi)
- Established: April 30, 1996
- Governing body: BC Parks

Main Lake Provincial Park is a provincial park on Quadra Island in British Columbia, Canada. Established in 1996 as Main Lakes Chain Park and renamed and expanded in 1997, the park encompasses a large wilderness area of six lakes with many diverse animal, bird and plant species. Opportunities for visitor observation and outdoor recreation include wilderness camping, canoeing, kayaking and hiking. Main Lake, Village Bay Lake and Mine Lake are connected by narrow, shallow marshes. Clear Lake, Stramberg Lake and Little Main Lake are accessible by hiking or rough portage.

== Gallery ==
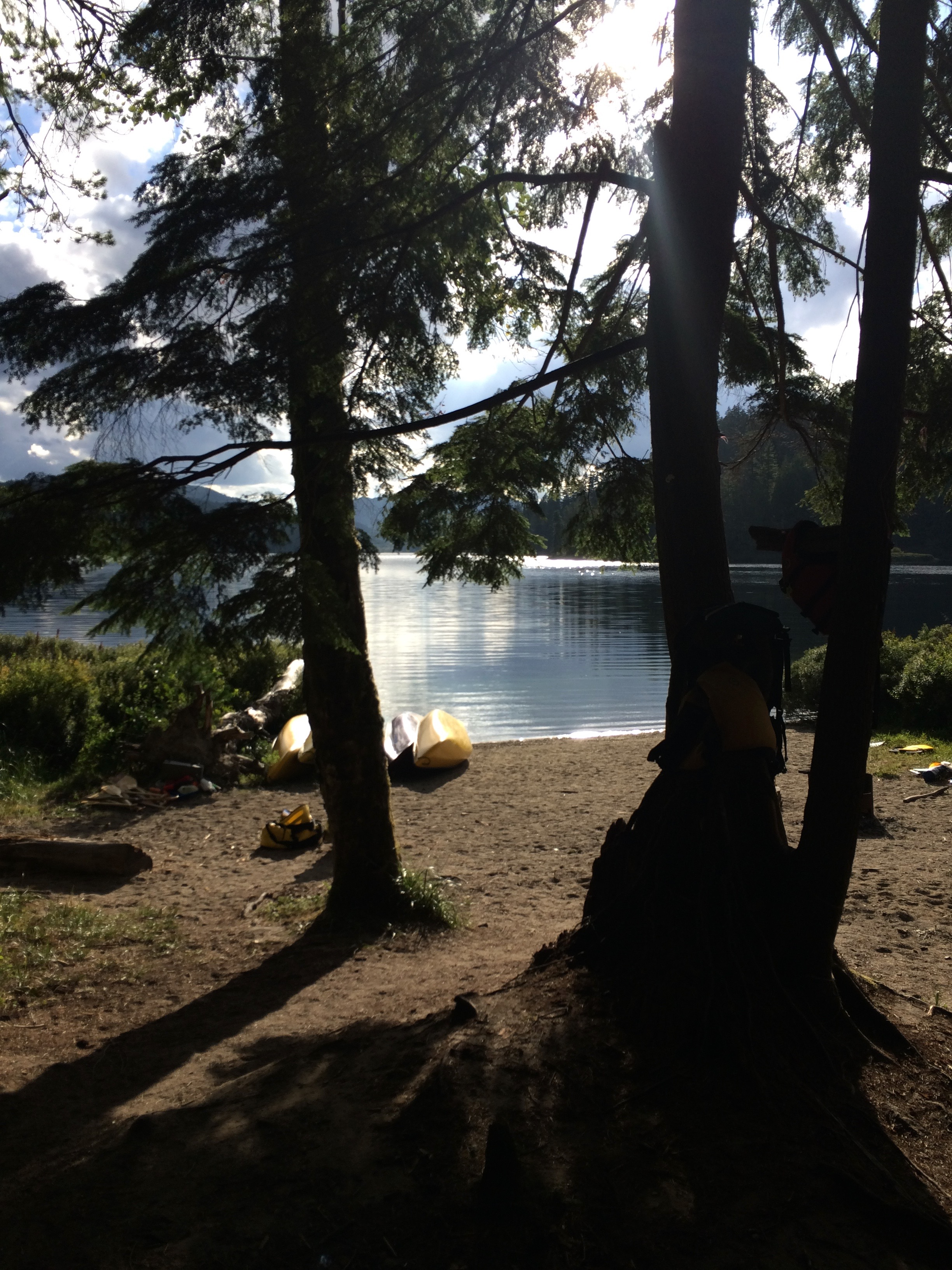
Campsite at Main Lake Provincial Park

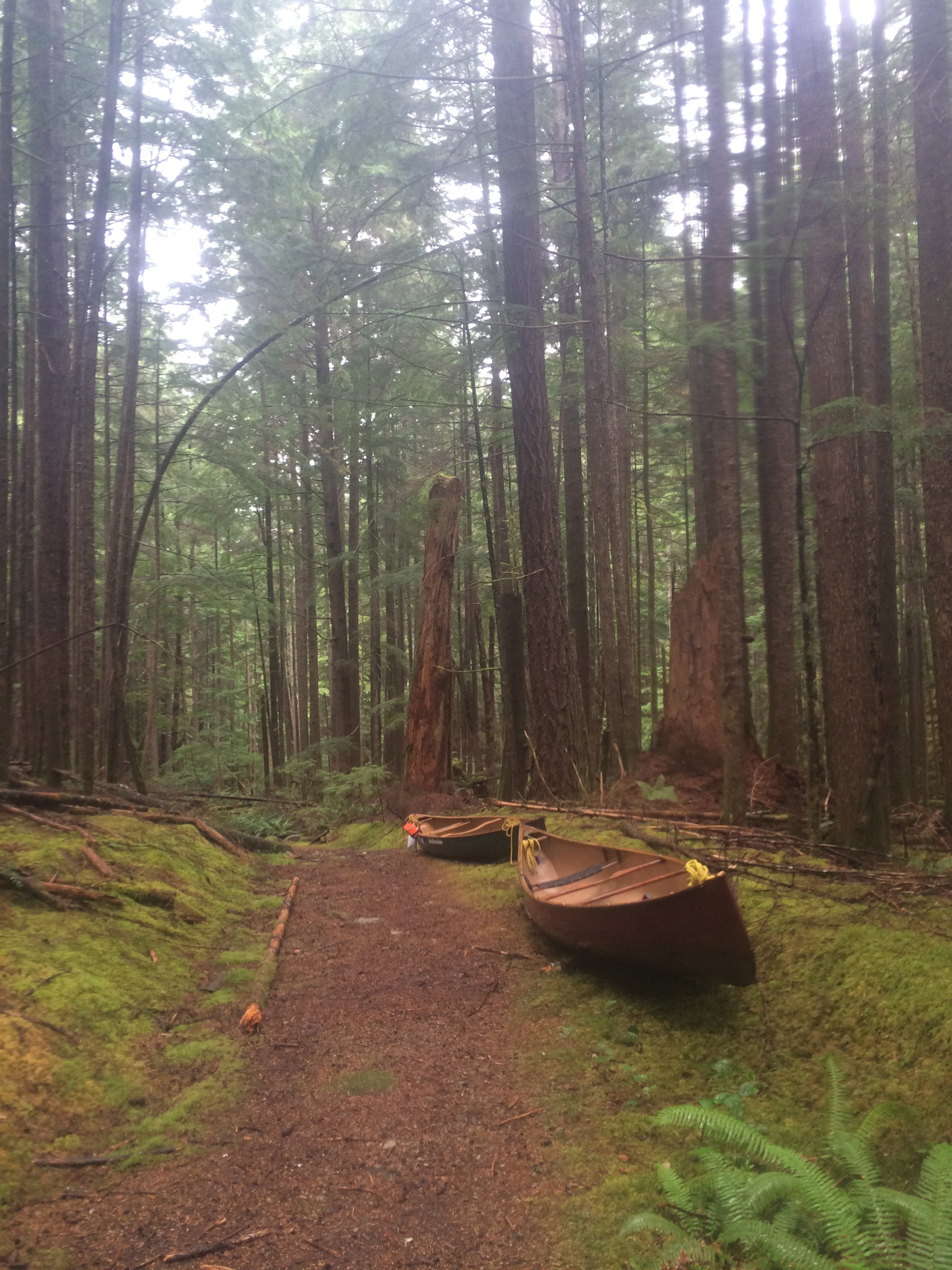
Canoes along a portage between Main Lake and the ocean
