= Paupores, Minnesota =

Paupores
- Unincorporated community
- Location within Minnesota Location within the United States
- Coordinates: 46°52′21″N 92°45′52″W
- Country: United States
- State: Minnesota
- County: St. Louis
- Elevation: 1,250 ft (380 m)
- Time zone: UTC-6 (Central (CST))
  - Summer (DST): UTC-5 (CDT)
- Area code: 218
- GNIS feature ID: 662145

Paupores is an unincorporated community in St. Louis County, in the U.S. state of Minnesota.

== History ==
Paupores contained a post office from 1902 until 1904. The community derives its name from Phil Poupore, an early postmaster.

Poupore (also Paupore) was a Great Northern railroad siding on the St. Louis River halfway between Floodwood and Brookston. It was named after French-Canadian logger and timber contractor, Antoine Poupore (1835-1909), who settled there in 1892 with his wife Philomene Trepanier Poupore and their ten children. At its height, Poupore had a store, one-room log school, post office, and blacksmith shop. Along the river Antoine established several logging camps which employed over 100 men. Logs were driven 40 miles down the St. Louis River to mills in Cloquet. After the death of its last resident, Wilfred L. Poupore, in 1974, the site gradually reverted into a forest. Duluth News Tribune
