= Taylor Township, Minnesota =

Taylor Township is the name of some places in the U.S. state of Minnesota:

- Taylor Township, Beltrami County, Minnesota
- Taylor Township, Traverse County, Minnesota

See also: Taylor Township (disambiguation)
