= Taylor Township, Indiana =

Taylor Township, Indiana may refer to:

- Taylor Township, Greene County, Indiana
- Taylor Township, Harrison County, Indiana
- Taylor Township, Howard County, Indiana
- Taylor Township, Owen County, Indiana

== See also ==
- Taylor Township (disambiguation)
