= Taylor Township, Pennsylvania =

Taylor Township is the name of some places in the U.S. state of Pennsylvania:

- Taylor Township, Blair County, Pennsylvania
- Taylor Township, Centre County, Pennsylvania
- Taylor Township, Fulton County, Pennsylvania
- Taylor Township, Lawrence County, Pennsylvania

== See also ==
- East Taylor Township, Cambria County, Pennsylvania
- Middle Taylor Township, Pennsylvania
- West Taylor Township, Cambria County, Pennsylvania
- Taylor, Pennsylvania, a borough in Lackawanna County
- Taylor Township (disambiguation)
