= Sugar Bush Township, Minnesota =

Sugar Bush Township is the name of some places in the U.S. state of Minnesota:

- Sugar Bush Township, Becker County, Minnesota
- Sugar Bush Township, Beltrami County, Minnesota
