= Ten Lake Township, Beltrami County, Minnesota =

Township in Minnesota

Ten Lake Township, Minnesota
- Township
- Location of Ten Lake Township, within Beltrami County, Minnesota
- Coordinates: 47°27′1″N 94°37′2″W
- Country: United States
- State: Minnesota
- County: Beltrami

Area
  - Total: 35.9 sq mi (93.1 km^{2})
  - Land: 22.6 sq mi (58.5 km^{2})
  - Water: 13.4 sq mi (34.7 km^{2})
- Elevation: 1,335 ft (407 m)

Population (2020)
  - Total: 1,023
  - Density: 45.3/sq mi (17.5/km^{2})
- Time zone: UTC-6 (Central (CST))
  - Summer (DST): UTC-5 (CDT)
- ZIP code: 56601
- Area code: 218
- FIPS code: 27-64390
- GNIS feature ID: 0665773
- Website: https://www.tenlaketownship.com/

Ten Lake Township is a township in Beltrami County, Minnesota, United States. The population was 1,023 as of the 2020 census.

== Geography ==
According to the United States Census Bureau, the township has a total area of 35.9 square miles (93.1 km^{2}), of which 22.6 square miles (58.5 km^{2}) is land and 13.4 square miles (34.7 km^{2}), or 37.22%, is water.

=== Unincorporated towns ===
- Andrusia at 47.486063°N 94.663871°W

(This list is based on USGS data and may include former settlements.)

=== Lakes ===
- Big Lake (south quarter)
- Blue Sky Lake
- Buck Lake
- Cass Lake
- Cass Lake (west quarter)
- Drewery Lake
- Little Lost Lake
- Lake Andrusia
- Lost Lake
- Luck Lake
- Mission Lake
- Silver Lake
- Ten Lake
- Windigo Lake

=== Adjacent townships ===
- Sugar Bush Township (north)
- Moose Lake Township (northeast)
- Pike Bay Township, Cass County (south)
- Farden Township, Hubbard County (southwest)
- Frohn Township (west)
- Turtle River Township (northwest)

== Demographics ==
Historical population
Census	Pop.	Note	%±
1910	121		—
1920	268		121.5%
1930	284		6.0%
1940	363		27.8%
1950	330		−9.1%
1960	237		−28.2%
1970	231		−2.5%
1980	496		114.7%
1990	651		31.3%
2000	1,005		54.4%
2010	1,026		2.1%
2020	1,023		−0.3%
U.S. Decennial Census

As of the census of 2000, there were 1,005 people, 312 households, and 249 families residing in the township. The population density was 44.2 inhabitants per square mile (17.1/km^{2}). There were 502 housing units at an average density of 22.1/sq mi (8.5/km^{2}). The racial makeup of the township was 35.32% White, 61.99% Native American, 0.10% from other races, and 2.59% from two or more races. Hispanic or Latino of any race were 0.60% of the population.

There were 312 households, out of which 44.6% had children under the age of 18 living with them, 44.6% were married couples living together, 27.2% had a female householder with no husband present, and 19.9% were non-families. 14.1% of all households were made up of individuals, and 5.8% had someone living alone who was 65 years of age or older. The average household size was 3.22 and the average family size was 3.41.

In the township the population was spread out, with 36.8% under the age of 18, 8.0% from 18 to 24, 24.2% from 25 to 44, 22.7% from 45 to 64, and 8.4% who were 65 years of age or older. The median age was 31 years. For every 100 females, there were 97.1 males. For every 100 females age 18 and over, there were 93.0 males.

The median income for a household in the township was $33,906, and the median income for a family was $34,896. Males had a median income of $29,125 versus $20,573 for females. The per capita income for the township was $11,853. About 17.7% of families and 21.6% of the population were below the poverty line, including 28.4% of those under age 18 and 4.8% of those age 65 or over.
