= Fishtown =

Fishtown may refer to:

== Places ==
=== Liberia ===
- Fish Town, capital city of River Gee County

=== United States ===
- Fishtown, Indiana, unincorporated community in Harrison County, Indiana
- Fishtown, Philadelphia, neighborhood in Philadelphia, Pennsylvania
- Fishtown Historic District, historic district in Leland, Michigan.
- Fishtown (art colony), informal artists' community, Skagit County, Washington

== Other uses ==
- Fischtown Pinguins, Germanized nickname for an ice hockey team based in Bremerhaven, Germany
- Fishtown, a comic book written by Kevin Colden
