= Pike Bay Township, Cass County, Minnesota =

Pike Bay Township, Minnesota
- Township
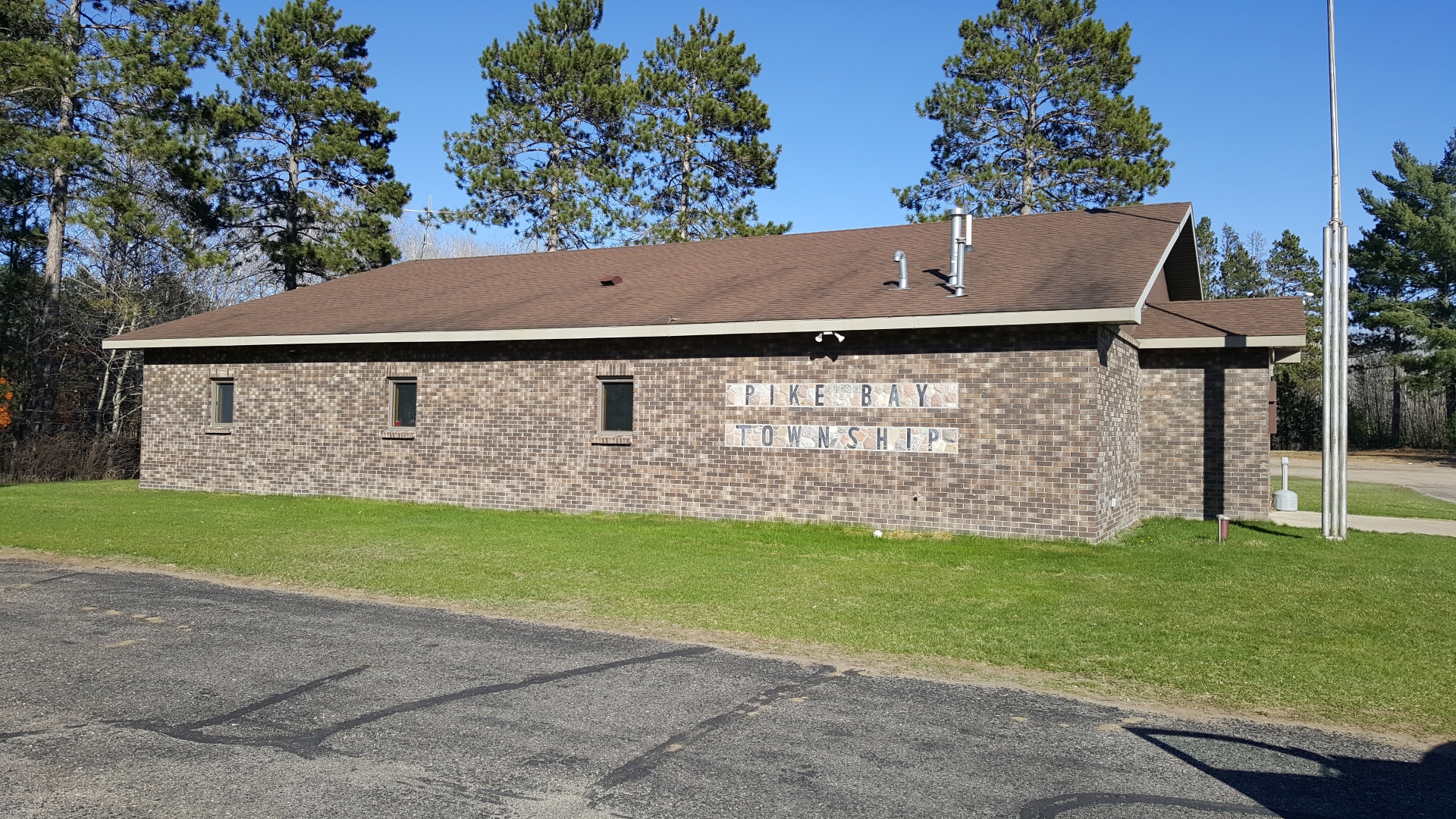
- Pike Bay Township Hall

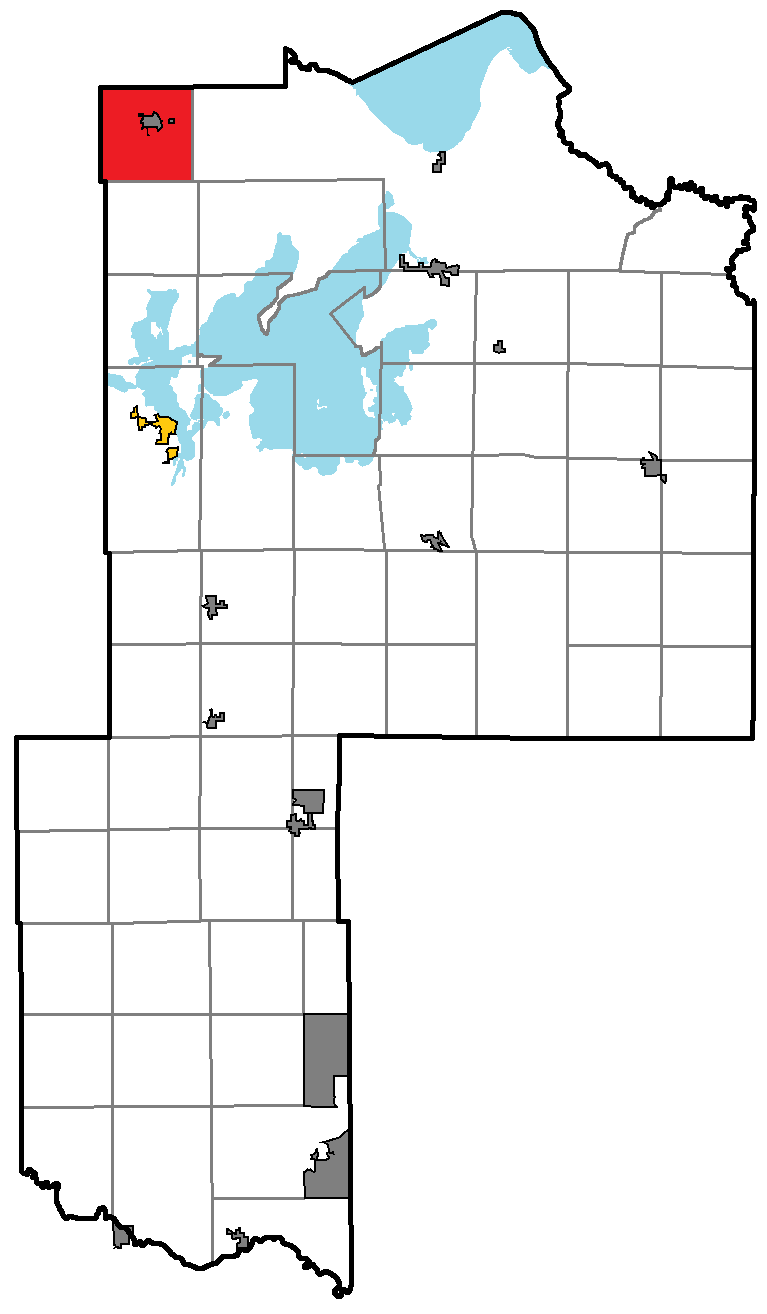
- Location of Pike Bay Township, within Cass County, Minnesota
- Coordinates: 47°22′13″N 94°36′9″W
- Country: United States
- State: Minnesota
- County: Cass

Area
  - Total: 34.7 sq mi (90.0 km^{2})
  - Land: 22.3 sq mi (57.8 km^{2})
  - Water: 12.4 sq mi (32.2 km^{2})
- Elevation: 1,332 ft (406 m)

Population (2020)
  - Total: 1,713
  - Density: 76.8/sq mi (29.6/km^{2})
- Time zone: UTC-6 (Central (CST))
  - Summer (DST): UTC-5 (CDT)
- ZIP code: 56633
- Area code: 218
- FIPS code: 27-50848
- GNIS feature ID: 0665295
- Website: http://www.pikebaytownship.org/

Pike Bay Township is a township in Cass County, Minnesota, United States. The population was 1,713 as of the 2020 census. Pike Bay Township was named for Pike Bay of Cass Lake, and indirectly for Zebulon Pike, an explorer.

== Geography ==
According to the United States Census Bureau, the township has a total area of 34.8 square miles (90.0 km^{2}), of which 22.3 square miles (57.8 km^{2}) is land and 12.4 square miles (32.2 km^{2}) (35.77%) is water.

The city of Cass Lake is located entirely within Pike Bay Township geographically but is a separate entity.

=== Major highways ===
- U.S. Highway 2
- Minnesota State Highway 371

=== Lakes ===
- Camp Lake
- Cass Lake (southern portion)
- Drewery Lake
- Experiment Lake (west half)
- Little Wolf Lake
- Richard Lake
- Spike Lake
- Ten Section Lake
- Pike Bay

=== Adjacent townships ===
- Ten Lake Township, Beltrami County (north)
- Wilkinson Township (south)
- Hart Lake Township, Hubbard County (southwest)
- Farden Township, Hubbard County (west)
- Frohn Township, Beltrami County (northwest)

=== Cemeteries ===
The township contains Thompson Cemetery.

== Demographics ==
As of the census of 2000, there were 1,643 people, 528 households, and 400 families residing in the township. The population density was 73.6 inhabitants per square mile (28.4/km^{2}). There were 724 housing units at an average density of 32.4 per square mile (12.5/km^{2}). The racial makeup of the township was 28.18% White, 68.84% Native American, 0.18% Asian, 0.43% from other races, and 2.37% from two or more races. Hispanic or Latino of any race were 2.62% of the population.

There were 528 households, out of which 41.9% had children under the age of 18 living with them, 37.3% were married couples living together, 27.8% had a female householder with no husband present, and 24.1% were non-families. 19.3% of all households were made up of individuals, and 6.4% had someone living alone who was 65 years of age or older. The average household size was 3.11 and the average family size was 3.43.

In the township the population was spread out, with 36.8% under the age of 18, 10.4% from 18 to 24, 24.7% from 25 to 44, 21.0% from 45 to 64, and 7.1% who were 65 years of age or older. The median age was 28 years. For every 100 females, there were 92.4 males. For every 100 females age 18 and over, there were 91.0 males.

The median income for a household in the township was $28,792, and the median income for a family was $27,727. Males had a median income of $26,300 versus $21,400 for females. The per capita income for the township was $10,589. About 22.6% of families and 24.1% of the population were below the poverty line, including 30.1% of those under age 18 and 18.3% of those age 65 or over.
