= Third River =

Third River may refer to:

- Third River Township, Itasca County, Minnesota
- Third River (Minnesota)
- Third River (New Jersey), a tributary of the Passaic River
