= Moose Lake Township, Beltrami County, Minnesota =

Moose Lake Township, Minnesota
- Township
- Location of Moose Lake Township, within Beltrami County, Minnesota
- Coordinates: 47°32′24″N 94°29′26″W
- Country: United States
- State: Minnesota
- County: Beltrami

Area
  - Total: 36.1 sq mi (93.6 km^{2})
  - Land: 30.8 sq mi (79.9 km^{2})
  - Water: 5.3 sq mi (13.7 km^{2})
- Elevation: 1,342 ft (409 m)

Population (2020)
  - Total: 272
  - Density: 8.82/sq mi (3.40/km^{2})
- Time zone: UTC-6 (Central (CST))
  - Summer (DST): UTC-5 (CDT)
- FIPS code: 27-43936
- GNIS feature ID: 0665023
- Website: https://mooselaketownship.org/

Moose Lake Township is a township in Beltrami County, Minnesota, United States. The population was 272 as of the 2020 census.

== Geography ==
According to the United States Census Bureau, the township has a total area of 36.2 square miles (93.6 km^{2}), of which 30.9 square miles (79.9 km^{2}) is land and 5.3 square miles (13.7 km^{2}) (14.63%) is water.

=== Lakes ===
- Big Rice Lake (east quarter)
- Kitchi Lake (northeast half)
- Little Moose Lake
- Little Pimushe Lake
- Little Rice Lake
- Moose Lake
- Pimushe Lake (east three-quarters)
- Popple Lake
- Rice Lake

=== Adjacent townships ===
- Birch Township (north)
- Third River Township, Itasca County (northeast)
- Ten Lake Township (southwest)
- Sugar Bush Township (west)
- Taylor Township (northwest)

== Demographics ==
Historical population
Census	Pop.	Note	%±
1900	45		—
1910	96		113.3%
1920	176		83.3%
1930	184		4.5%
1940	164		−10.9%
1950	117		−28.7%
1960	112		−4.3%
1970	93		−17.0%
1980	167		79.6%
1990	166		−0.6%
2000	205		23.5%
2010	226		10.2%
2020	272		20.4%
U.S. Decennial Census

As of the census of 2000, there were 205 people, 75 households, and 54 families residing in the township. The population density was 6.6 people per square mile (2.6/km^{2}). There were 154 housing units at an average density of 5.0/sq mi (1.9/km^{2}). The racial makeup of the township was 96.59% White and 3.41% Native American.

There were 75 households, out of which 33.3% had children under the age of 18 living with them, 65.3% were married couples living together, 4.0% had a female householder with no husband present, and 26.7% were non-families. 20.0% of all households were made up of individuals, and 6.7% had someone living alone who was 65 years of age or older. The average household size was 2.73 and the average family size was 3.22.

In the township the population was spread out, with 28.8% under the age of 18, 4.4% from 18 to 24, 25.4% from 25 to 44, 26.8% from 45 to 64, and 14.6% who were 65 years of age or older. The median age was 41 years. For every 100 females, there were 122.8 males. For every 100 females age 18 and over, there were 121.2 males.

The median income for a household in the township was $24,271, and the median income for a family was $25,417. Males had a median income of $35,625 versus $20,000 for females. The per capita income for the township was $13,527. About 9.4% of families and 20.8% of the population were below the poverty line, including 29.5% of those under the age of eighteen and 15.4% of those 65 or over.
