= Birch Township, Beltrami County, Minnesota =

Township in Minnesota, United States

Birch Township, Minnesota
- Township
- Location of Birch Township, within Beltrami County, Minnesota
- Coordinates: 47°36′19″N 94°30′26″W
- Country: United States
- State: Minnesota
- County: Beltrami

Area
  - Total: 36.1 sq mi (93.6 km^{2})
  - Land: 34.1 sq mi (88.4 km^{2})
  - Water: 2.0 sq mi (5.2 km^{2})
- Elevation: 1,362 ft (415 m)

Population (2020)
  - Total: 103
  - Density: 3.02/sq mi (1.17/km^{2})
- Time zone: UTC-6 (Central (CST))
  - Summer (DST): UTC-5 (CDT)
- ZIP code: 56630
- Area code: 218
- FIPS code: 27-05914
- GNIS feature ID: 0663593

Birch Township is a township in Beltrami County, Minnesota, United States. The population was 103 as of the 2020 census.

Birch Township was named for the canoe birch trees there from which Native Americans built canoes.

== Geography ==
According to the United States Census Bureau, the township has a total area of 36.1 square miles (93 km^{2}), of which 34.1 square miles (88 km^{2}) is land and 2.0 square miles (5.2 km^{2}) (5.53%) is water.

=== Lakes ===
- Anderson Lake
- Baumgartner Lake
- Chinaman Lake
- Coleman Lake
- Damon Lake
- Dollar Lake
- Ellis Lake
- Gilstad Lake (southeast three-quarters)
- Gimmer Lake
- Holland Lake
- Little Gilstad Lake
- Mud Lake
- Pimushe Lake (northeast edge)
- Rabideau Lake
- Webster Lake

=== Adjacent townships ===
- Summit Township (north)
- Moose Park Township, Itasca County (northeast)
- Third River Township, Itasca County (east)
- Moose Lake Township (south)
- Sugar Bush Township (southwest)
- Taylor Township (west)

== Demographics ==
Historical population
Census	Pop.	Note	%±
1900	4		—
1910	82		1,950.0%
1920	108		31.7%
1930	57		−47.2%
1940	75		31.6%
1950	64		−14.7%
1960	49		−23.4%
1970	46		−6.1%
1980	71		54.3%
1990	85		19.7%
2000	116		36.5%
2010	118		1.7%
2020	103		−12.7%
U.S. Decennial Census

As of the census of 2000, there were 116 people, 44 households, and 34 families residing in the township. The population density was 3.4 inhabitants per square mile (1.3/km^{2}). There were 55 housing units at an average density of 1.6 per square mile (0.62/km^{2}). The racial makeup of the township was 93.10% White, 3.45% Native American, 0.86% from other races, and 2.59% from two or more races. Hispanic or Latino of any race were 6.90% of the population.

There were 44 households, out of which 29.5% had children under the age of 18 living with them, 72.7% were married couples living together, 2.3% had a female householder with no husband present, and 20.5% were non-families. 20.5% of all households were made up of individuals, and 6.8% had someone living alone who was 65 years of age or older. The average household size was 2.64 and the average family size was 3.06.

In the township the population was spread out, with 29.3% under the age of 18, 0.9% from 18 to 24, 27.6% from 25 to 44, 30.2% from 45 to 64, and 12.1% who were 65 years of age or older. The median age was 42 years. For every 100 females, there were 146.8 males. For every 100 females age 18 and over, there were 134.3 males.

The median income for a household in the township was $41,250, and the median income for a family was $42,500. Males had a median income of $36,250 versus $30,000 for females. The per capita income for the township was $18,474. There were no families and 1.5% of the population living below the poverty line, including no under eighteens and 9.5% of those over 64.
