= Taylor Township =

Taylor Township may refer to:

== Canada ==
- Taylor Township, Cochrane District, Ontario

== United States ==
=== Arkansas ===
- Taylor Township, Columbia County, Arkansas, in Columbia County, Arkansas
- Taylor Township, Craighead County, Arkansas, in Craighead County, Arkansas
- Taylor Township, Nevada County, Arkansas, in Nevada County, Arkansas

=== Illinois ===
- Taylor Township, Ogle County, Illinois

=== Indiana ===
- Taylor Township, Greene County, Indiana
- Taylor Township, Harrison County, Indiana
- Taylor Township, Howard County, Indiana
- Taylor Township, Owen County, Indiana

=== Iowa ===
- Taylor Township, Allamakee County, Iowa
- Taylor Township, Appanoose County, Iowa
- Taylor Township, Benton County, Iowa
- Taylor Township, Dubuque County, Iowa, in Dubuque County, Iowa
- Taylor Township, Harrison County, Iowa
- Taylor Township, Marshall County, Iowa

=== Michigan ===
- Taylor Township, Michigan, defunct

=== Minnesota ===
- Taylor Township, Beltrami County, Minnesota
- Taylor Township, Traverse County, Minnesota

=== Missouri ===
- Taylor Township, Greene County, Missouri, in Greene County, Missouri
- Taylor Township, Grundy County, Missouri
- Taylor Township, Shelby County, Missouri
- Taylor Township, Sullivan County, Missouri, in Sullivan County, Missouri

=== North Dakota ===
- Taylor Township, Sargent County, North Dakota, in Sargent County, North Dakota

=== Ohio ===
- Taylor Township, Union County, Ohio

=== Oklahoma ===
- Taylor Township, Cleveland County, Oklahoma

=== Pennsylvania ===
- Taylor Township, Blair County, Pennsylvania
- Taylor Township, Centre County, Pennsylvania
- Taylor Township, Fulton County, Pennsylvania
- Taylor Township, Lawrence County, Pennsylvania

=== South Dakota ===
- Taylor Township, Hanson County, South Dakota, in Hanson County, South Dakota
- Taylor Township, Tripp County, South Dakota, in Tripp County, South Dakota

== See also ==
- Taylor (disambiguation)
