= Frohn Township, Beltrami County, Minnesota =

Frohn Township, Minnesota
- Township
- Location of Frohn Township, within Beltrami County, Minnesota
- Coordinates: 47°26′47″N 94°43′35″W
- Country: United States
- State: Minnesota
- County: Beltrami

Area
  - Total: 36.4 sq mi (94.2 km^{2})
  - Land: 32.4 sq mi (84.0 km^{2})
  - Water: 3.9 sq mi (10.2 km^{2})
- Elevation: 1,332 ft (406 m)

Population (2020)
  - Total: 1,537
  - Density: 47.4/sq mi (18.3/km^{2})
- Time zone: UTC-6 (Central (CST))
  - Summer (DST): UTC-5 (CDT)
- ZIP code: 56601
- Area code: 218
- FIPS code: 27-22886
- GNIS feature ID: 0664235
- Website: frohntownship.com

Frohn Township is a township in Beltrami County, Minnesota, United States. The population was 1,537 as of the 2020 census. Frohn Township was named after Fron, Norway, the homeland of a large share of the early settlers.

== Geography ==
According to the United States Census Bureau, the township has a total area of 36.4 square miles (94.2 km^{2}), of which 32.4 square miles (84.0 km^{2}) is land and 3.9 square miles (10.2 km^{2}), or 10.85%, is water.

=== Major highway ===
- U.S. Route 2

=== Lakes ===
- Goose Lake
- Grace Lake
- Lake Swenson
- School Lake
- Stocking Lake
- Stump Lake (southeast three-quarters)
- Wolf Lake

=== Adjacent townships ===
- Turtle River Township (north)
- Sugar Bush Township (northeast)
- Ten Lake Township (east)
- Pike Bay Township, Cass County (southeast)
- Farden Township, Hubbard County (south)
- Helga Township, Hubbard County (southwest)
- Bemidji Township (west)

=== Cemeteries ===
The township contains East Side Cemetery.

== Demographics ==
Historical population
Census	Pop.	Note	%±
1900	207		—
1910	300		44.9%
1920	370		23.3%
1930	400		8.1%
1940	438		9.5%
1950	358		−18.3%
1960	335		−6.4%
1970	453		35.2%
1980	918		102.6%
1990	1,151		25.4%
2000	1,408		22.3%
2010	1,433		1.8%
2020	1,537		7.3%
U.S. Decennial Census

As of the census of 2000, there were 1,408 people, 497 households, and 396 families residing in the township. The population density was 43.3 inhabitants per square mile (16.7/km^{2}). There were 631 housing units at an average density of 19.4 per square mile (7.5/km^{2}). The racial makeup of the township was 87.22% White, 9.09% Native American, 0.21% Asian, 0.07% Pacific Islander, 0.85% from other races, and 2.56% from two or more races. Hispanic or Latino of any race were 1.07% of the population.

There were 497 households, out of which 39.8% had children under the age of 18 living with them, 68.6% were married couples living together, 6.6% had a female householder with no husband present, and 20.3% were non-families. 16.1% of all households were made up of individuals, and 5.8% had someone living alone who was 65 years of age or older. The average household size was 2.83 and the average family size was 3.16.

In the township the population was spread out, with 29.2% under the age of 18, 7.7% from 18 to 24, 28.8% from 25 to 44, 27.1% from 45 to 64, and 7.2% who were 65 years of age or older. The median age was 36 years. For every 100 females, there were 106.1 males. For every 100 females age 18 and over, there were 110.3 males.

The median income for a household in the township was $47,788, and the median income for a family was $53,250. Males had a median income of $35,263 versus $25,735 for females. The per capita income for the township was $17,988. About 3.6% of families and 7.4% of the population were below the poverty line, including 7.1% of those under age 18 and 4.4% of those age 65 or over.
