= Evans Landing =

Evans Landing may refer to:

- Evans Landing, Indiana
- Evans Landing, Queensland
