= Worth Township, Centre County, Pennsylvania =

Township in Pennsylvania, US

Coordinates: 40°49′00″N 78°07′59″W

- Township
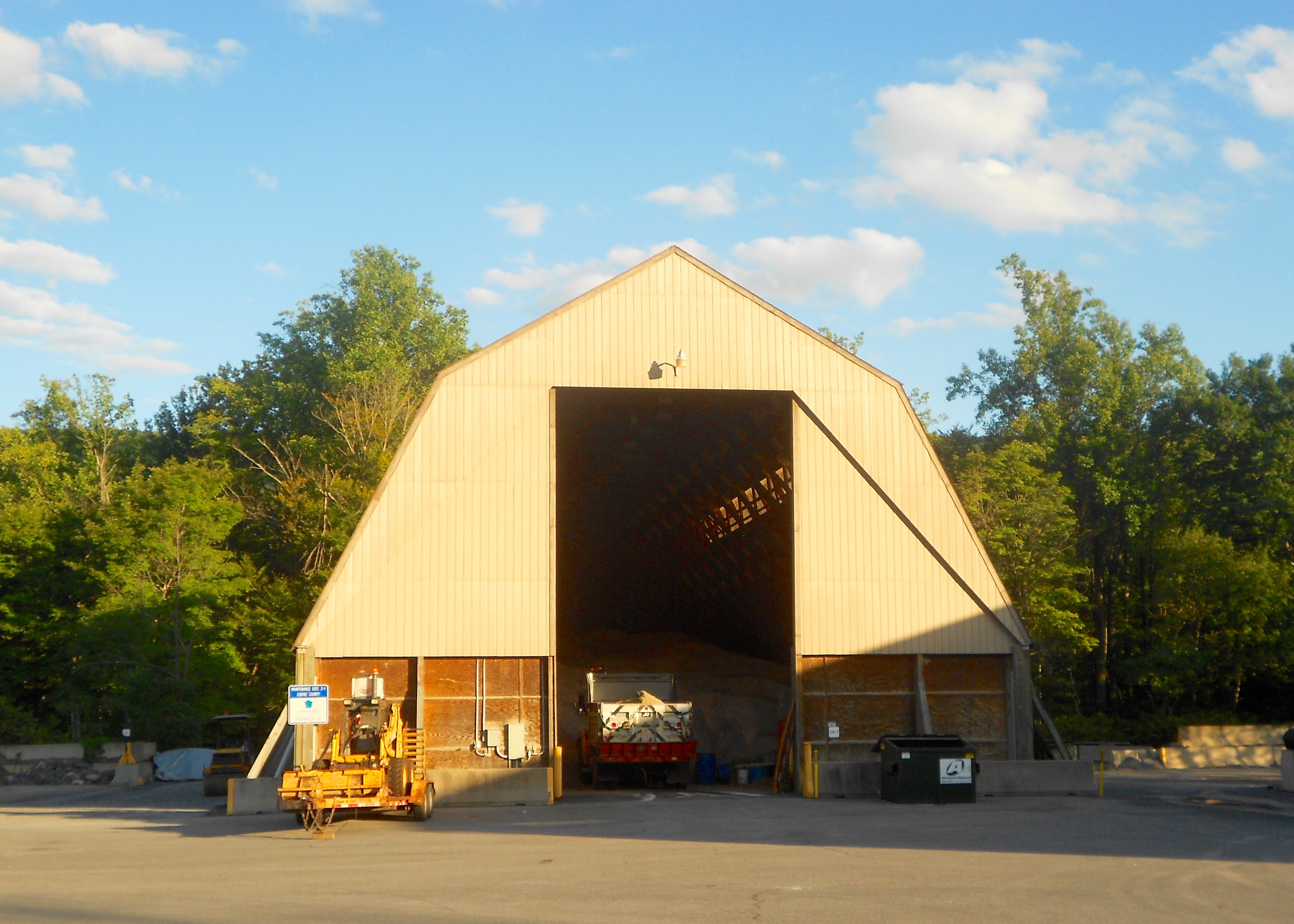
- PennDOT Maintenance Dist. 2-1

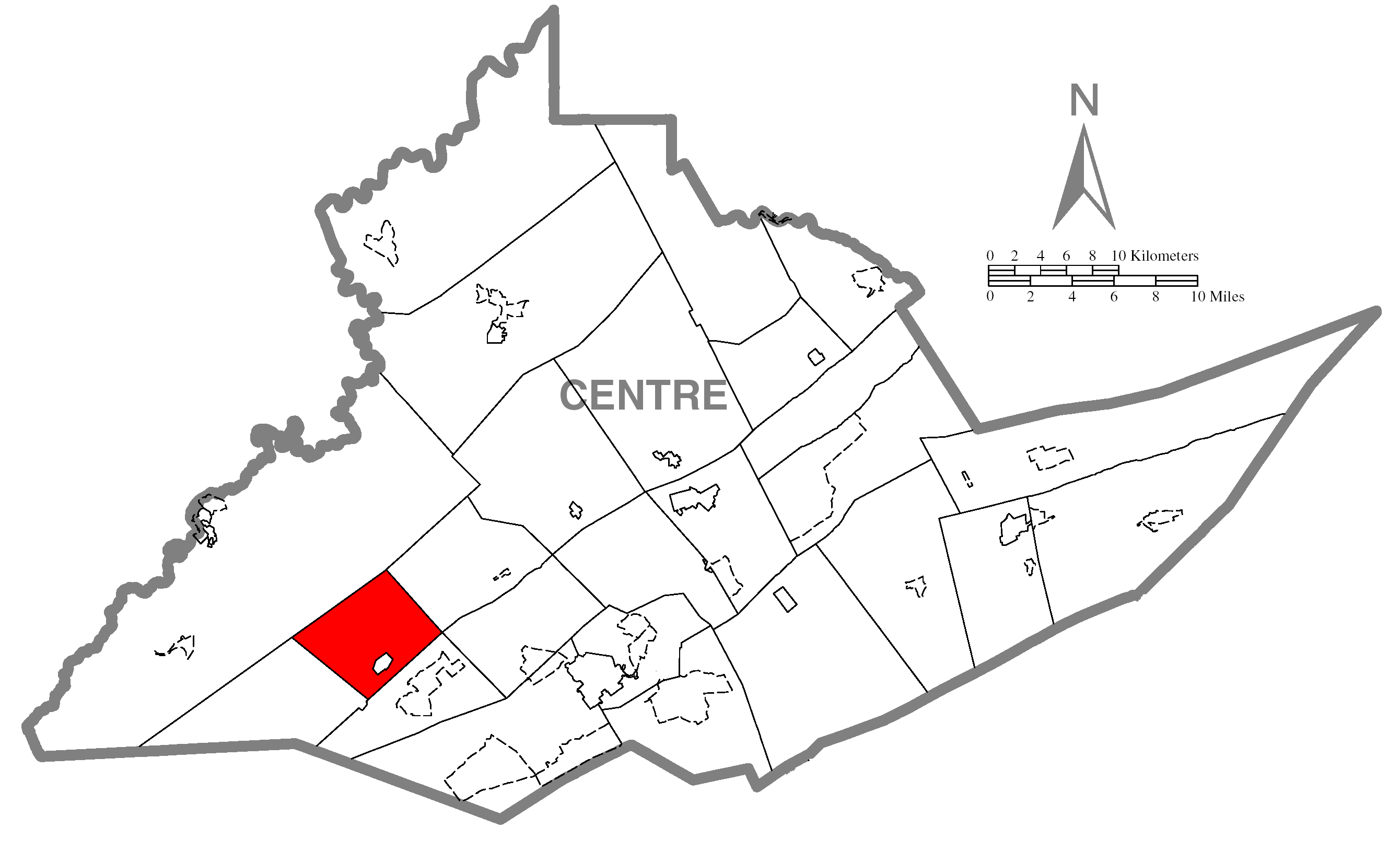
- Map of Centre County, Pennsylvania highlighting Worth Township

- Map of Centre County, Pennsylvania
- Country: United States
- State: Pennsylvania
- County: Centre
- Settled: 1785
- Incorporated: 1848

Area
  - Total: 21.66 sq mi (56.09 km^{2})
  - Land: 21.66 sq mi (56.09 km^{2})
  - Water: 0 sq mi (0.00 km^{2})

Population (2020)
  - Total: 734 ▼
  - Estimate (2021): 728
  - Density: 38.3/sq mi (14.78/km^{2})
- FIPS code: 42-027-86544

Worth Township is a township in Centre County, Pennsylvania, United States. It is part of the State College, Pennsylvania Metropolitan Statistical Area. The population was 734 at the 2020 census.

== Geography ==
According to the United States Census Bureau, the township has a total area of 21.7 square miles (56.1 km^{2}), all land.

Worth Township is bordered by Rush Township to the northwest, Huston Township to the northeast, Halfmoon Township to the southeast and Taylor Township to the southwest.

== Demographics ==
Historical population
Census	Pop.	Note	%±
2000	835		—
2010	824		−1.3%
2020	734		−10.9%
2021 (est.)	728		−0.8%
U.S. Decennial Census

As of the census of 2000, there were 835 people, 313 households, and 240 families residing in the township. The population density was 38.5 inhabitants per square mile (14.9/km^{2}). There were 350 housing units at an average density of 16.1/sq mi (6.2/km^{2}). The racial makeup of the township was 98.08% White, 0.12% Native American, 0.24% Asian, 0.24% Pacific Islander, 0.84% from other races, and 0.48% from two or more races. Hispanic or Latino of any race were 0.96% of the population.

There were 313 households, out of which 33.5% had children under the age of 18 living with them, 69.0% were married couples living together, 4.2% had a female householder with no husband present, and 23.3% were non-families. 18.5% of all households were made up of individuals, and 6.7% had someone living alone who was 65 years of age or older. The average household size was 2.63 and the average family size was 3.01.

In the township the population was spread out, with 23.4% under the age of 18, 8.1% from 18 to 24, 31.6% from 25 to 44, 24.4% from 45 to 64, and 12.5% who were 65 years of age or older. The median age was 38 years. For every 100 females, there were 101.2 males. For every 100 females age 18 and over, there were 104.5 males.

The median income for a household in the township was $42,250, and the median income for a family was $49,773. Males had a median income of $30,221 versus $23,194 for females. The per capita income for the township was $17,999. About 4.3% of families and 7.7% of the population were below the poverty line, including 7.6% of those under age 18 and 13.4% of those age 65 or over.
