= South Philipsburg, Pennsylvania =

Unincorporated community in Pennsylvania, US

South Philipsburg
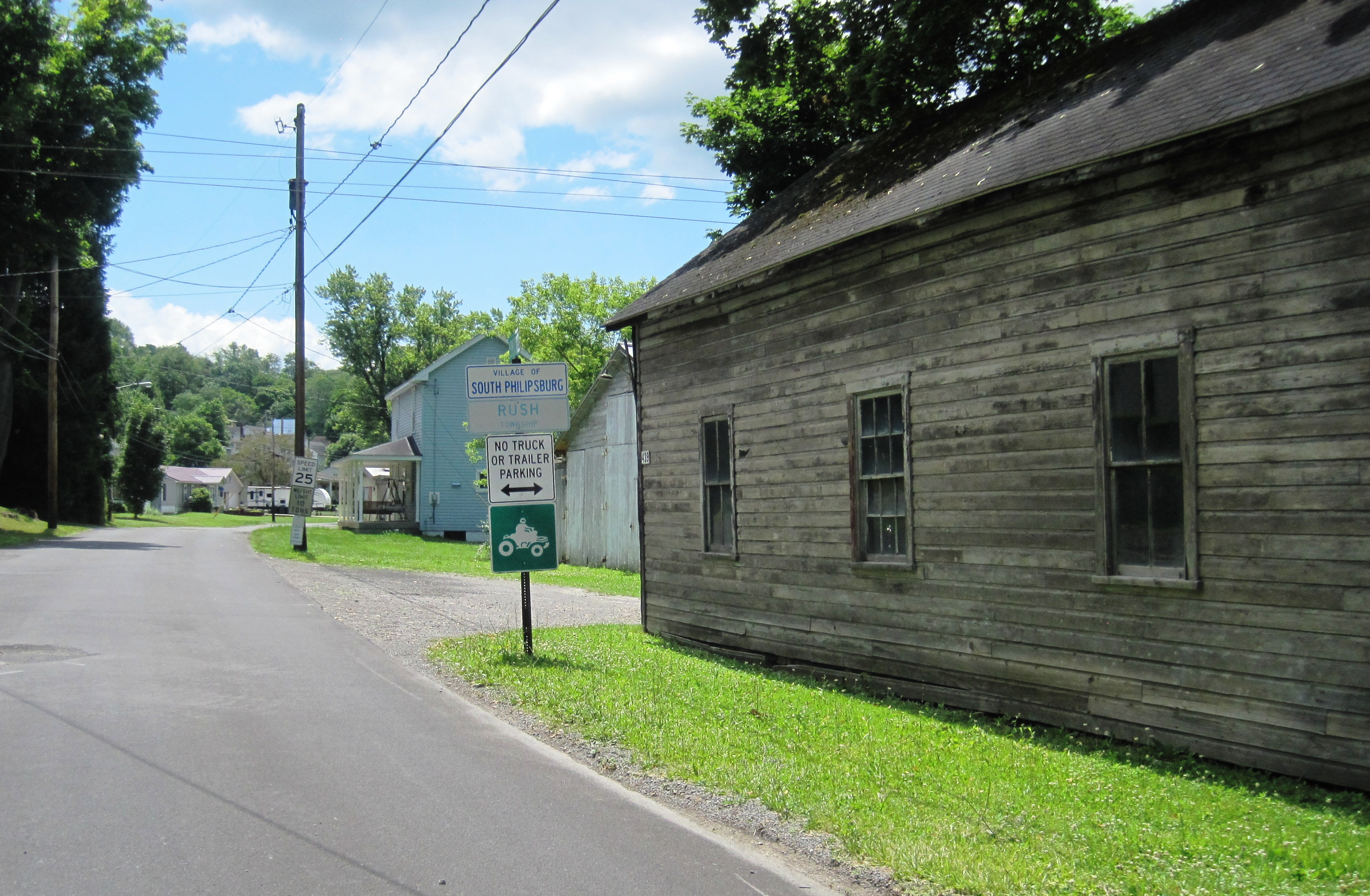
- Entering South Philipsburg along Hemlock Street

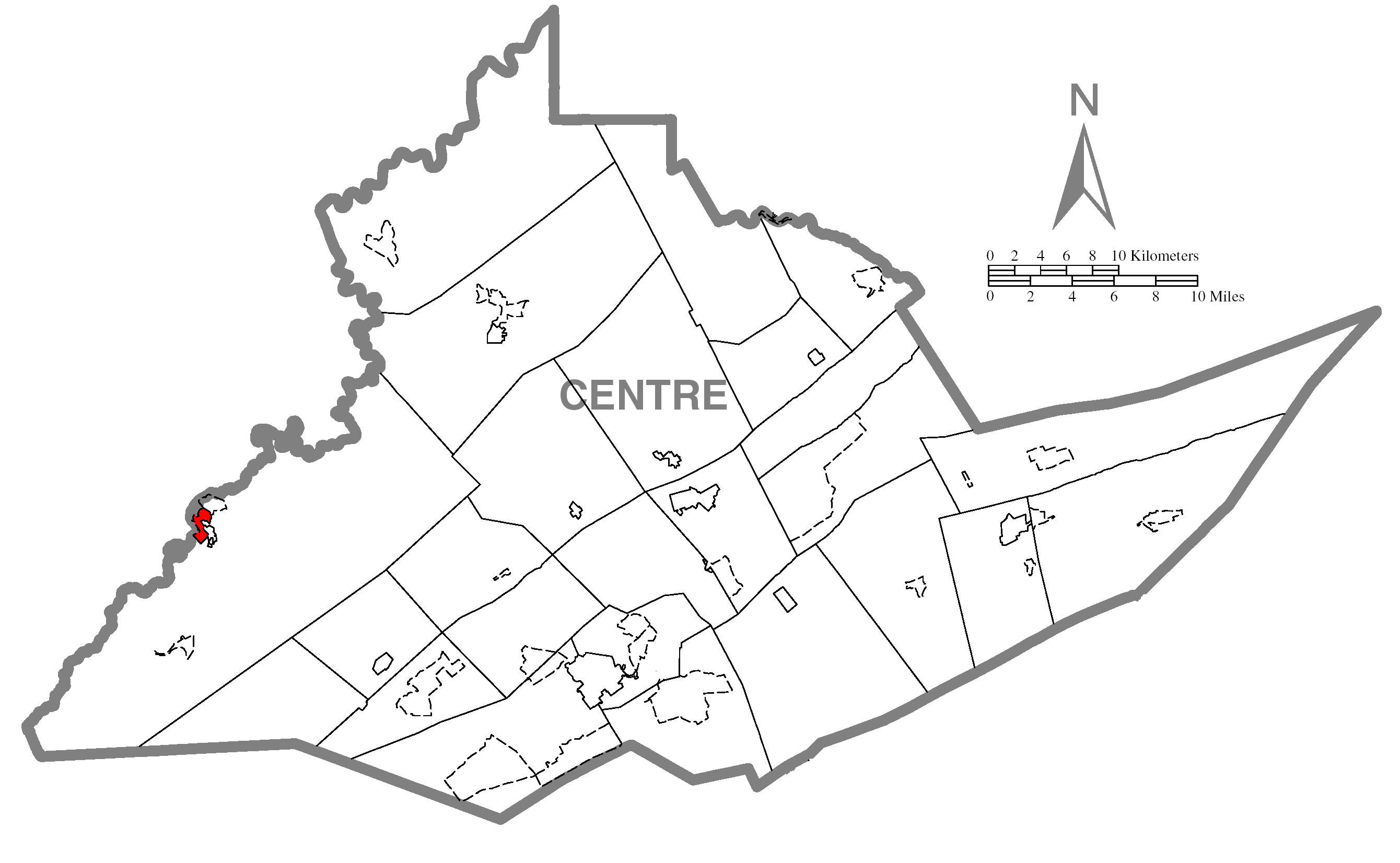
- Map showing South Philipsburg in Centre County

- Map showing Centre County in Pennsylvania

- Location within the U.S. state of Pennsylvania
- Coordinates: 40°53′15″N 78°13′03″W
- Country: United States
- State: Pennsylvania
- County: Centre
- Township: Rush
- Settled: 1797
- Incorporated (borough): 1891

Area
  - Total: 0.26 sq mi (0.67 km^{2})
  - Land: 0.26 sq mi (0.67 km^{2})
  - Water: 0 sq mi (0.0 km^{2})
- Elevation: 1,434 ft (437 m)

Population (2010)
  - Total: 410
  - Density: 1,575/sq mi (608.3/km^{2})
- Time zone: Eastern (EST)
  - Summer (DST): EDT
- Area code: 814
- FIPS code: 42-72416
- GNIS feature ID: 1188098

South Philipsburg is a census-designated place (CDP), formerly a borough, located in Centre County, Pennsylvania, United States. It is part of the State College, Pennsylvania Metropolitan Statistical Area. The population was 410 at the 2010 census. As of January 1, 2007, the borough government was dissolved and the area reverted to Rush Township.

== Geography ==
South Philipsburg is located in western Centre County at 40°53′15″N 78°13′3″W (40.887588, -78.217499), along Moshannon Creek, the Centre County/Clearfield County line. It is bordered to the north by the borough of Philipsburg and to the northwest, across Moshannon Creek, by the borough of Chester Hill. Pennsylvania Route 350 forms the eastern edge of the CDP, leading north into Philipsburg and south 14 miles (23 km) to Interstate 99 at Bald Eagle.

According to the United States Census Bureau, the CDP has a total area of 0.26 square miles (0.67 km^{2}), all land.

== Demographics ==
As of the census of 2010, there were 410 people, 180 households, and 119 families residing in the CDP. The population density was 1,366.7 inhabitants per square mile (527.7/km^{2}). There were 192 housing units at an average density of 640 per square mile (250/km^{2}). The racial makeup of the CDP was 99.3% White, 0.2% Native American, and 0.5% from two or more races. Hispanic or Latino of any race were 1.2% of the population.

There were 180 households, out of which 27.2% had children under the age of 18 living with them, 52.8% were married couples living together, 5.0% had a male householder with no wife present, 8.3% had a female householder with no husband present, and 33.9% were non-families. 28.3% of all households were made up of individuals, and 11.1% had someone living alone who was 65 years of age or older. The average household size was 2.28 and the average family size was 2.76.

In the CDP, the population was spread out, with 22.0% under the age of 18, 5.4% from 18 to 24, 24.1% from 25 to 44, 28.0% from 45 to 64, and 20.5% who were 65 years of age or older. The median age was 44 years. For every 100 females, there were 100 males. For every 100 females age 18 and over, there were 100 males.

The median income for a household in the CDP was $58,929, and the median income for a family was $70,156. The per capita income for the CDP was $21,359. About 1.6% of families and 5.2% of the population were below the poverty line, including 1.5% of those under age 18 and 11.3% of those age 65 or over.
