= Rush Township, Centre County, Pennsylvania =

Township in Pennsylvania, US

- Township
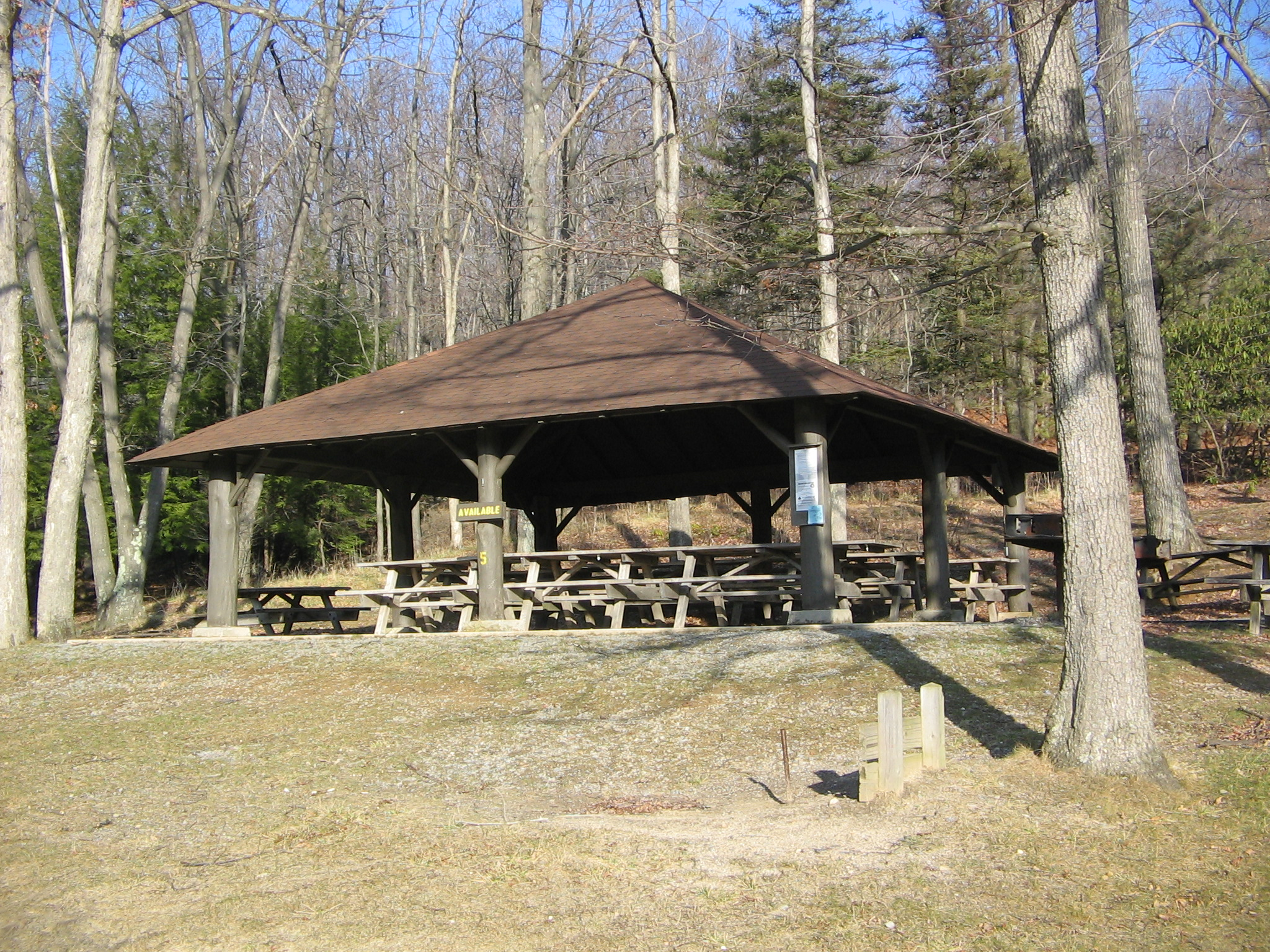
- One of the pavilions built by the CCC at Black Moshannon State Park in Rush Twp.

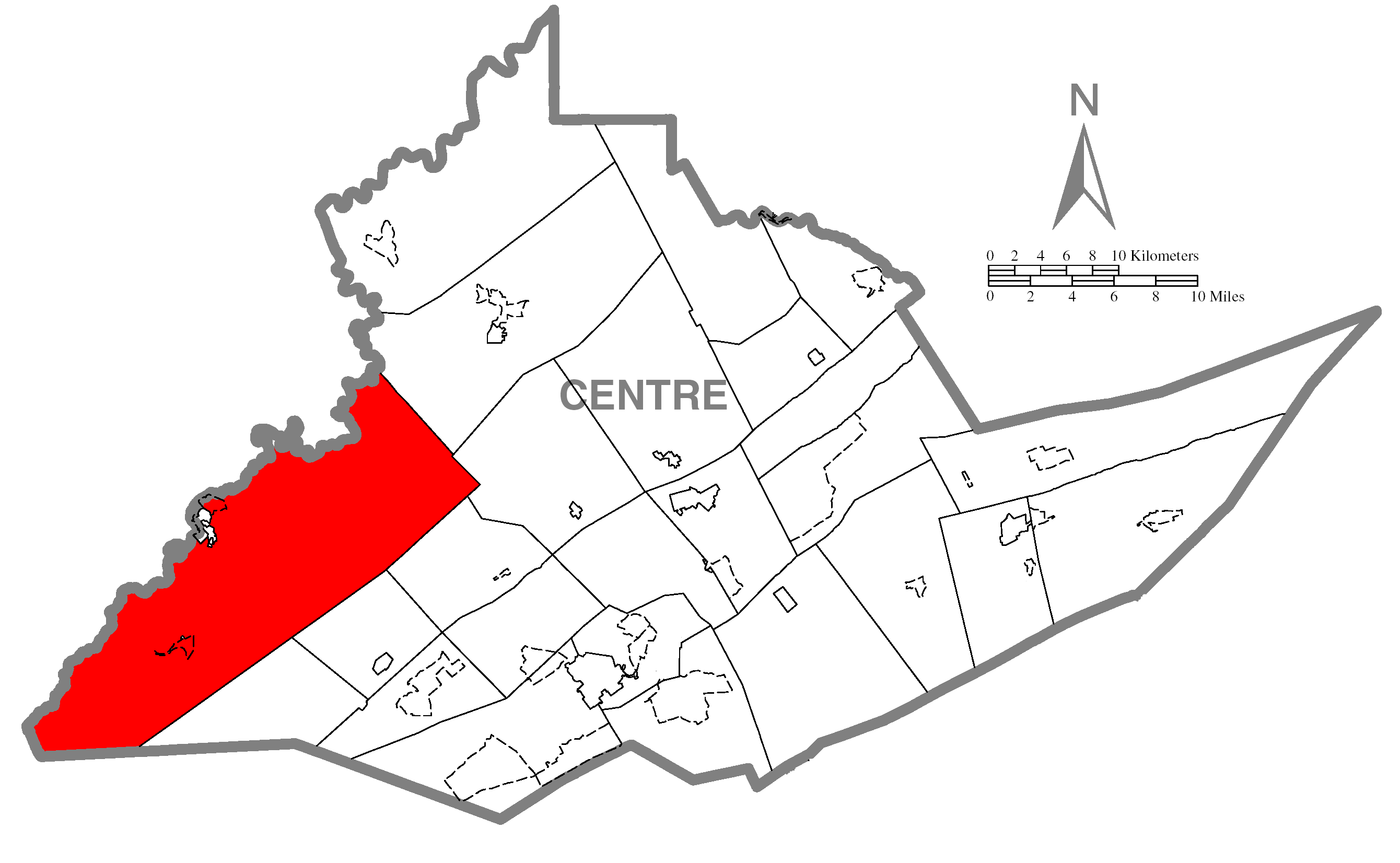
- Map of Centre County, Pennsylvania highlighting Rush Township

- Map of Centre County, Pennsylvania
- Country: United States
- State: Pennsylvania
- County: Centre
- Incorporated: 1814

Area
  - Total: 148.37 sq mi (384.27 km^{2})
  - Land: 148.13 sq mi (383.66 km^{2})
  - Water: 0.24 sq mi (0.62 km^{2})

Population (2020)
  - Total: 3,700 ▼
  - Estimate (2021): 3,655
  - Density: 26.9/sq mi (10.38/km^{2})
- Time zone: UTC-5 (EST)
  - Summer (DST): UTC-4 (EDT)
- FIPS code: 42-027-66736
- Website: rushtownship.net

Rush Township is a township in Centre County, Pennsylvania, United States. It is part of the Moshannon Valley and the State College, Pennsylvania Metropolitan Statistical Area. The population was 3,700 at the 2020 census, a decline from the figure of 4,008 tabulated in 2010.

== Geography ==
According to the United States Census Bureau, the township has a total area of 148.3 square miles (384.1 km^{2}), of which 148.1 square miles (383.5 km^{2}) is land and 0.23 square miles (0.6 km^{2}), or 0.16%, is water.

Rush Township is bordered by Clearfield County to the northwest, Snow Shoe and Union townships to the northeast, Huston, Worth and Taylor townships to the southeast, and Blair County to the southwest. The township includes the unincorporated communities of Casanova, North Philipsburg, South Philipsburg, Sandy Ridge, Glass City, New Town, Spike Island, Earnestville, and Penn Five.

== Demographics ==
Historical population
Census	Pop.	Note	%±
2000	3,466		—
2010	4,008		15.6%
2020	3,700		−7.7%
2021 (est.)	3,655		−1.2%
U.S. Decennial Census

As of the census of 2000, there were 3,466 people, 1,359 households, and 970 families residing in the township. The population density was 23.3 people per square mile (9.0 people/km^{2}). There were 1,687 housing units at an average density of 11.3 units per square mile (4.4 units/km^{2}). The racial makeup of the township was 99.28% White, 0.17% Native American, 0.26% Asian, and 0.29% from two or more races. Hispanic or Latino of any race were 0.23% of the population.

There were 1,359 households, out of which 27.4% had children under the age of 18 living with them, 60.0% were married couples living together, 7.7% had a female householder with no husband present, and 28.6% were non-families. 24.3% of all households were made up of individuals, and 12.7% had someone living alone who was 65 years of age or older. The average household size was 2.45 and the average family size was 2.92.

In the township the population was spread out, with 20.3% under the age of 18, 6.6% from 18 to 24, 28.3% from 25 to 44, 24.3% from 45 to 64, and 20.5% who were 65 years of age or older. The median age was 42 years. For every 100 females, there were 93.2 males. For every 100 females age 18 and over, there were 91.5 males.

The median income for a household in the township was $35,239, and the median income for a family was $39,826. Males had a median income of $32,067 versus $20,302 for females. The per capita income for the township was $15,683. About 4.0% of families and 6.9% of the population were below the poverty line, including 9.2% of those under age 18 and 7.4% of those age 65 or over.

== Recreation ==
The largest portion of the Pennsylvania State Game Lands Number 60 occupies roughly half of the township.
