= George Wilson Homestead =

Historic house in Pennsylvania, United States

- U.S. National Register of Historic Places
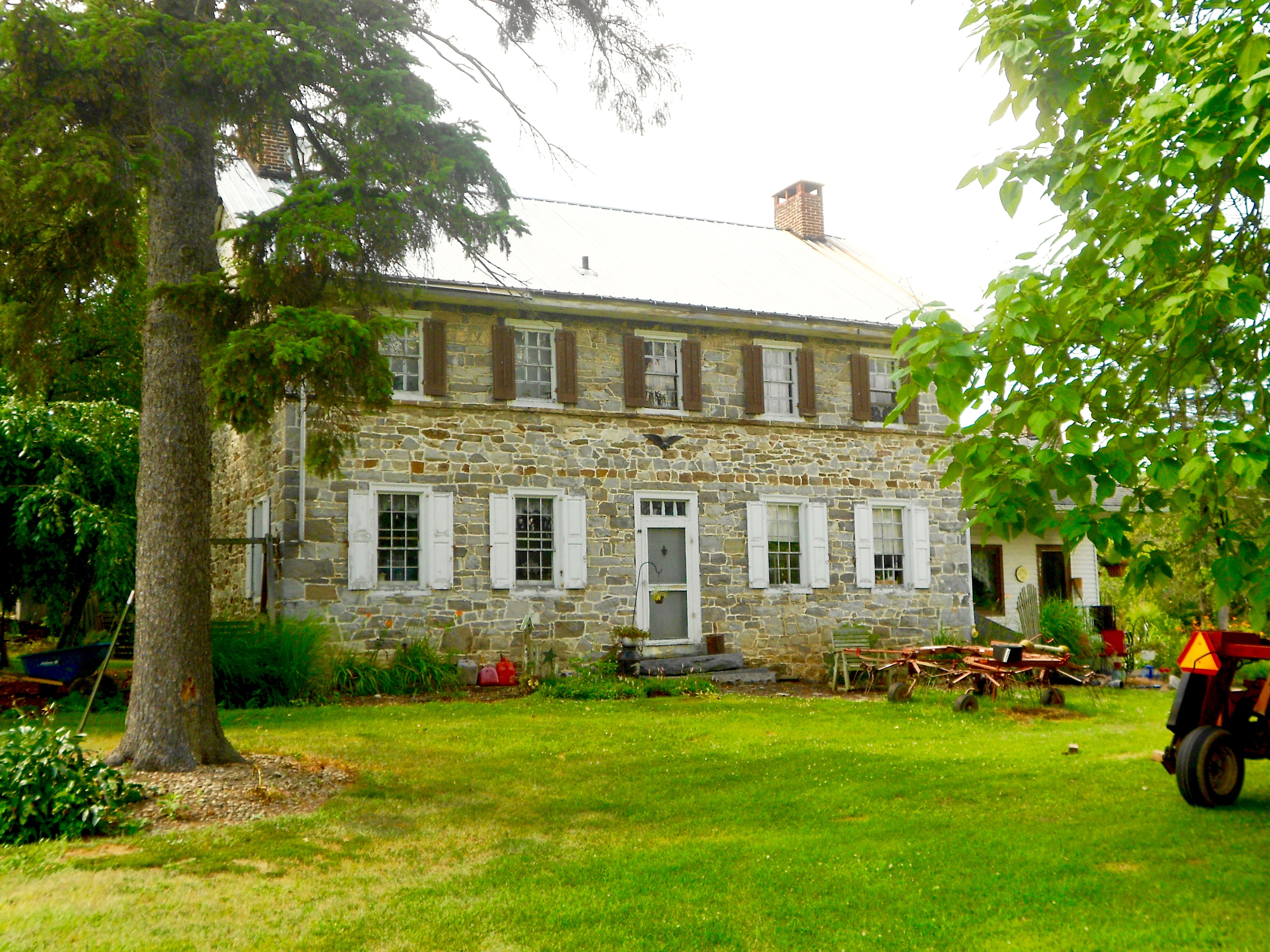

- Location within Pennsylvania Location within the United States
- Nearest city: Southwest of Centennial on Pennsylvania Route 550, Halfmoon Township, Pennsylvania
- Coordinates: 40°45′19″N 78°4′5″W
- Area: 12.4 acres (5.0 ha)
- Built: 1810
- Built by: George Wilson
- Architectural style: Georgian
- NRHP reference No.: 82003776
- Added to NRHP: February 24, 1982

The George Wilson Homestead is an historic home which is located in Halfmoon Township, Centre County, Pennsylvania.

It was added to the National Register of Historic Places in 1982.

== History and architectural features ==
The original owner of this home, George Wilson, was a pioneer Quaker settler in the Halfmoon Valley. Built in 1810, Wilson's home is a two-and-one-half-story, five-bay, limestone and sandstone dwelling with a medium pitch gable roof. The house measures forty feet by twenty-five feet, and was designed in the Georgian style. A one-and-one-half-story, sixteen square foot addition was built circa 1870. Also located on the property are a number of contributing outbuildings, including a barn, which was erected circa 1820, a carriage shed, a storage garage that was built sometime during the 1930s, a saltbox shed, a gable shed, two corn cribs, and an ice house.
