= Buena Vista, Harrison County, Indiana =

Unincorporated community in Indiana, United States

Coordinates: 38°03′32″N 85°58′48″W

Buena Vista is an unincorporated community in Taylor Township, Harrison County, Indiana, in the United States.

== History ==
Buena Vista was laid out in 1850. The community was named after the 1847 Battle of Buena Vista in the Mexican–American War. An old variant name was Convenience. A post office called Convenience was established in 1878, and remained in operation until 1904.

On March 28, 1859, a meteor exploded over the area and distributed meteorites over a 4 square mile area. Only four Chondrite meteorites were recovered, two of which are in a museum in London. Dr. Crosier collected and thoroughly analyzed the samples. His findings reported the people that found them, the location, composition, size and smell.
