= Halfmoon Township, Pennsylvania =

Township in Pennsylvania, US

Coordinates: 40°47′00″N 78°01′59″W

- Township
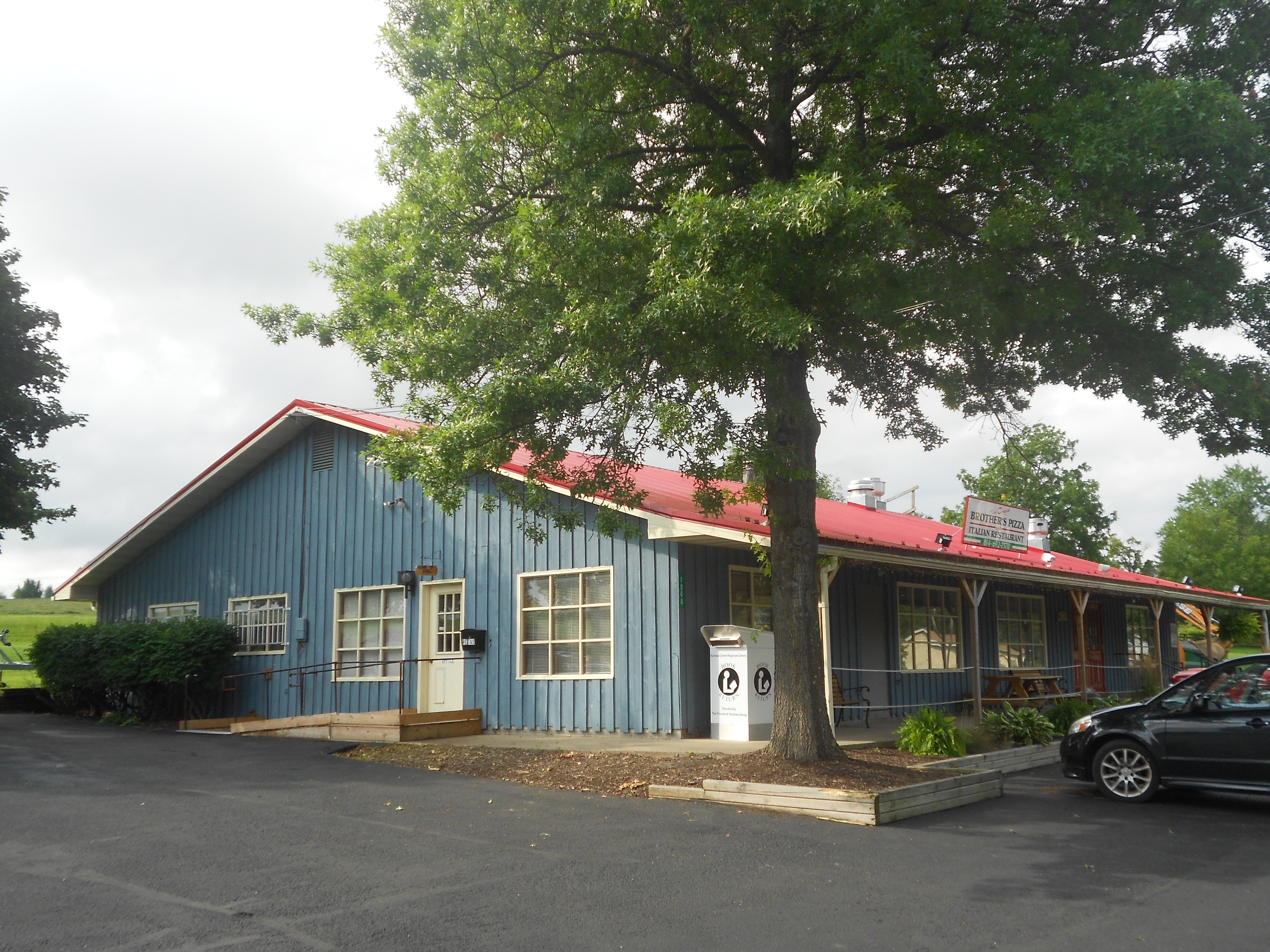
- Municipal offices and library on SR 550

- Logo

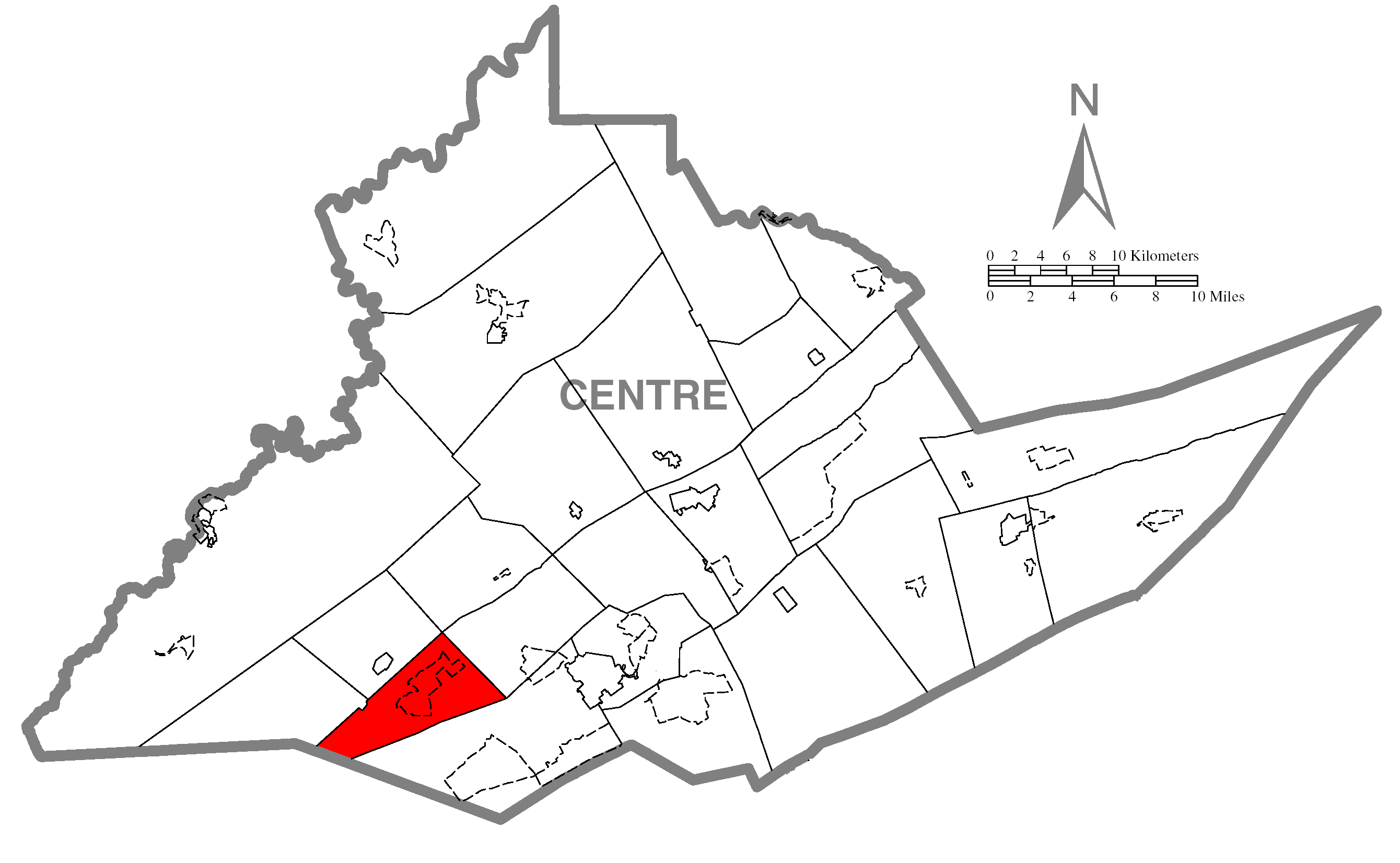
- Map of Centre County, Pennsylvania highlighting Halfmoon Township

- Map of Centre County, Pennsylvania
- Country: United States
- State: Pennsylvania
- County: Centre
- Settled: 1784
- Incorporated: 1801

Government
  - Type: Board of Supervisors

Area
  - Total: 23.59 sq mi (61.11 km^{2})
  - Land: 23.59 sq mi (61.11 km^{2})
  - Water: 0 sq mi (0.00 km^{2})

Population (2020)
  - Total: 2,819 ▲
  - Estimate (2021): 2,809
  - Density: 118.3/sq mi (45.69/km^{2})
- Time zone: UTC-5 (EST)
  - Summer (DST): UTC-4 (EDT)
- FIPS code: 42-027-31992
- Website: www.halfmoontwp.us

Halfmoon Township is a township in Centre County, Pennsylvania, United States. It is part of the State College, Pennsylvania Metropolitan Statistical Area. The township is synonymous with the Halfmoon Valley which is part of Happy Valley and the larger Nittany Valley. The population was 2,819 at the 2020 census, which is a 5.4% increase since the 2010 census.

== History ==
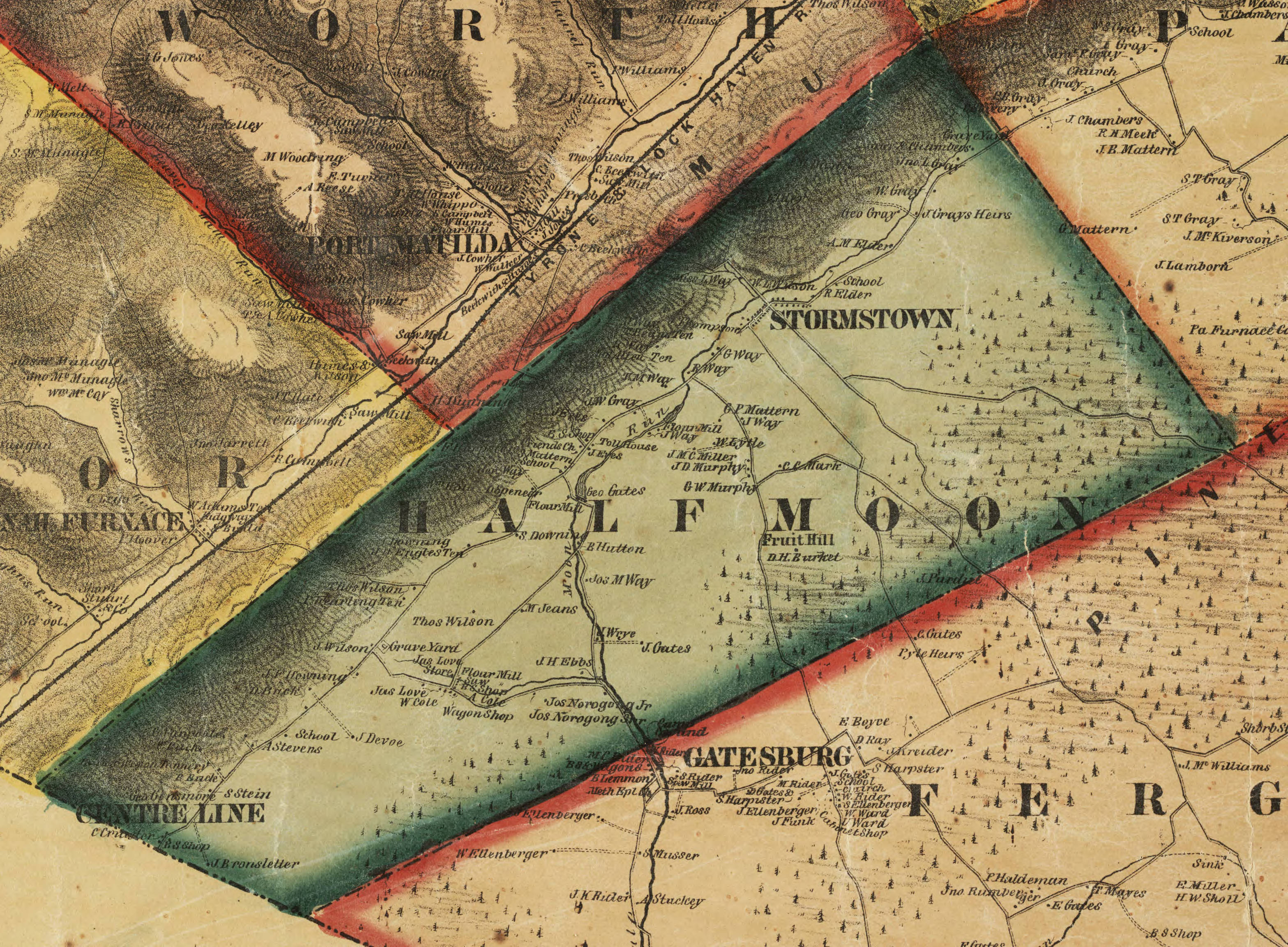
Atlas of Halfmoon Township, 1861

The name "Halfmoon" is thought to have come from crescent-shaped markings on tree trunks engraved by indigenous peoples marking a trail through the valley.

The first European to settle in Halfmoon was Abraham Elder in 1784, who came from Franklin County. He found an abandoned cabin and stayed there for the summer. The following fall, Elder returned to his family in Franklin County, and they returned in the spring of 1785, along with Elder's brother, David.

In 1826, Clemson Delidge and his family built a few log homes on what would become known as "Tow Hill" or "Fruit Hill," an early African American settlement in the Half Moon Valley. The families on Tow Hill worked for farmers, hunted, and harvested iron ore which was sold to the ironworks at Pennsylvania Furnace. They also planted fruit trees, which may be the origin to the name "Fruit Hill." The etymology behind the name "Tow Hill" is not clear. One assertion is that ore cars were towed uphill on rail from the iron ore deposits. Another possible origin is that the hamlet was named after the Tow Hill settlement near Columbia, Pennsylvania which was established as a community for manumitted slaves along the Underground Railroad.

White people in the neighboring villages referred to Black people on Tow Hill as "Tow Heads." The Delidge family moved to Scotia and Marysville in neighboring Patton Township when a large scale iron ore operation started in the area. In the 1890s the operation ceased.

The Abraham Elder Stone House and George Wilson Homestead are listed on the National Register of Historic Places.

== Geography ==
According to the United States Census Bureau, the township has a total area of 23.6 square miles (61.1 km^{2}), all land.

Halfmoon Township is bordered by Taylor and Worth townships to the northwest, Patton Township to the northeast, Ferguson Township to the southeast and Huntingdon County to the southwest.

Halfmoon Creek, a tributary of Spruce Creek and the Little Juniata River, flows from the northeastern edge of the township, along Halfmoon Valley Road, through the communities of Stormstown, Centennial, and Loveville before passing into Ferguson Township at Marengo.

== Demographics ==
Historical population
Census	Pop.	Note	%±
2000	2,357		—
2010	2,667		13.2%
2020	2,819		5.7%
2021 (est.)	2,809		−0.4%
U.S. Decennial Census

As of the census of 2010, there were 2,667 people, 913 households, and 778 families residing in the township. The population density was 118.0 inhabitants per square mile (45.6/km^{2}). There were 963 housing units at an average density of 42.6/sq mi (16.4/km^{2}). The racial makeup of the township was 97.3% White, 0.5% Black or African American, 0.8% Asian, and 1.4% from two or more races. Hispanic or Latino of any race were 1.1% of the population.

There were 913 households, out of which 44.1% had children under the age of 18 living with them, 79.1% were married couples living together, 2.3% had a male householder with no wife present, 3.8% had a female householder with no husband present, and 14.8% were non-families. 10.8% of all households were made up of individuals, and 3.1% had someone living alone who was 65 years of age or older. The average household size was 2.92 and the average family size was 3.19.

In the township the population was spread out, with 28.4% under the age of 18, 5.8% from 18 to 24, 23.4% from 25 to 44, 35.7% from 45 to 64, and 6.7% who were 65 years of age or older. The median age was 41 years. For every 100 females, there were 104.2 males. For every 100 females age 18 and over, there were 102.0 males.

The median income for a household in the township was $98,911, and the median income for a family was $103,224. The per capita income for the township was $36,018. About 4.1% of families and 3.9% of the population were below the poverty line, including 2.5% of those under age 18 and none of those age 65 or over.

== Transportation ==
Pennsylvania Route 550 is the primary thoroughfare for the township.

== Education ==
Halfmoon Township is part of the State College Area School District.
