= Turtle River Township, Beltrami County, Minnesota =

Turtle River Township, Minnesota
- Township
- Location of Turtle River Township, within Beltrami County, Minnesota
- Coordinates: 47°32′14″N 94°44′9″W
- Country: United States
- State: Minnesota
- County: Beltrami

Area
  - Total: 35.9 sq mi (93.0 km^{2})
  - Land: 31.4 sq mi (81.4 km^{2})
  - Water: 4.5 sq mi (11.6 km^{2})
- Elevation: 1,380 ft (420 m)

Population (2020)
  - Total: 1,226
  - Density: 39.0/sq mi (15.1/km^{2})
- Time zone: UTC-6 (Central (CST))
  - Summer (DST): UTC-5 (CDT)
- ZIP code: 56601
- Area code: 218
- FIPS code: 27-65812
- GNIS feature ID: 0665822
- Website: www.turtlerivertownshipmn.gov

Turtle River Township is a township in Beltrami County, Minnesota, United States. The population was 1,226 as of the 2020 census.

== Geography ==
According to the United States Census Bureau, the township has a total area of 35.9 square miles (93.0 km^{2}), of which 31.4 square miles (81.4 km^{2}) is land and 4.5 square miles (11.6 km^{2}), or 12.50%, is water.

The south quarter of the city of Turtle River is within this township geographically but is a separate entity.

=== Major highways ===
- U.S. Route 71

=== Lakes ===
- Big Bass Lake
- Big Grass Lake
- Buck Lake
- Gallager Lake
- Little Bass Lake
- Little Gnat Lake (southeast half)
- Long Lake (vast majority)
- Moose Lake (south edge)
- Roadside Lake (west half)
- Stump Lake (northeast edge)
- Turtle River Lake (south three-quarters)

=== Adjacent townships ===
- Port Hope Township (north)
- Taylor Township (northeast)
- Sugar Bush Township (east)
- Ten Lake Township (southeast)
- Frohn Township (south)
- Northern Township (west)
- Turtle Lake Township (northwest)

=== Cemeteries ===
The township contains Pine Ridge Cemetery.

== Demographics ==
Historical population
Census	Pop.	Note	%±
1900	100		—
1910	127		27.0%
1920	187		47.2%
1930	195		4.3%
1940	222		13.8%
1950	148		−33.3%
1960	148		0.0%
1970	237		60.1%
1980	526		121.9%
1990	799		51.9%
2000	1,098		37.4%
2010	1,085		−1.2%
2020	1,226		13.0%
U.S. Decennial Census

As of the census of 2000, there were 1,098 people, 394 households, and 308 families residing in the township. The population density was 34.9 inhabitants per square mile (13.5/km^{2}). There were 519 housing units at an average density of 16.5/sq mi (6.4/km^{2}). The racial makeup of the township was 93.90% White, 3.19% Native American, 1.28% Asian, 0.27% from other races, and 1.37% from two or more races. Hispanic or Latino of any race were 0.36% of the population.

There were 394 households, out of which 39.6% had children under the age of 18 living with them, 69.3% were married couples living together, 4.3% had a female householder with no husband present, and 21.8% were non-families. 16.8% of all households were made up of individuals, and 3.8% had someone living alone who was 65 years of age or older. The average household size was 2.76 and the average family size was 3.09.

In the township the population was spread out, with 27.7% under the age of 18, 8.7% from 18 to 24, 24.8% from 25 to 44, 29.1% from 45 to 64, and 9.7% who were 65 years of age or older. The median age was 39 years. For every 100 females, there were 112.8 males. For every 100 females age 18 and over, there were 115.2 males.

The median income for a household in the township was $53,571, and the median income for a family was $59,250. Males had a median income of $36,979 versus $30,461 for females. The per capita income for the township was $23,704. About 3.6% of families and 8.2% of the population were below the poverty line, including 12.6% of those under age 18 and 5.2% of those age 65 or over.
