= Centennial, Pennsylvania =

Unincorporated community in Pennsylvania, US

- Unincorporated community
- Location within the U.S. state of Pennsylvania Centennial (the United States)
- Coordinates: 40°46′39.22″N 78°2′34.02″W
- Country: United States
- State: Pennsylvania
- County: Centre
- Township: Halfmoon
- Time zone: UTC-5 (Eastern (EST))
  - Summer (DST): UTC-4 (EDT)
- ZIP code: 16870
- GNIS feature ID: 1192247

Centennial is a neighborhood and an unincorporated community in Halfmoon Township, Centre County, Pennsylvania, United States. It is a part of Stormstown. In 1792 Quakers would settle in the Halfmoon Valley and establish Centennial with a school, houses, and farms. The village of Loveville was founded in 1855 to the west of Centennial. State Route 3017, locally known as Beckwith Road, runs through Cenntenial and is the main connection between Port Matilda and Stormstown.
