= Abraham Elder Stone House =

Historic house in Pennsylvania, United States

- U.S. National Register of Historic Places
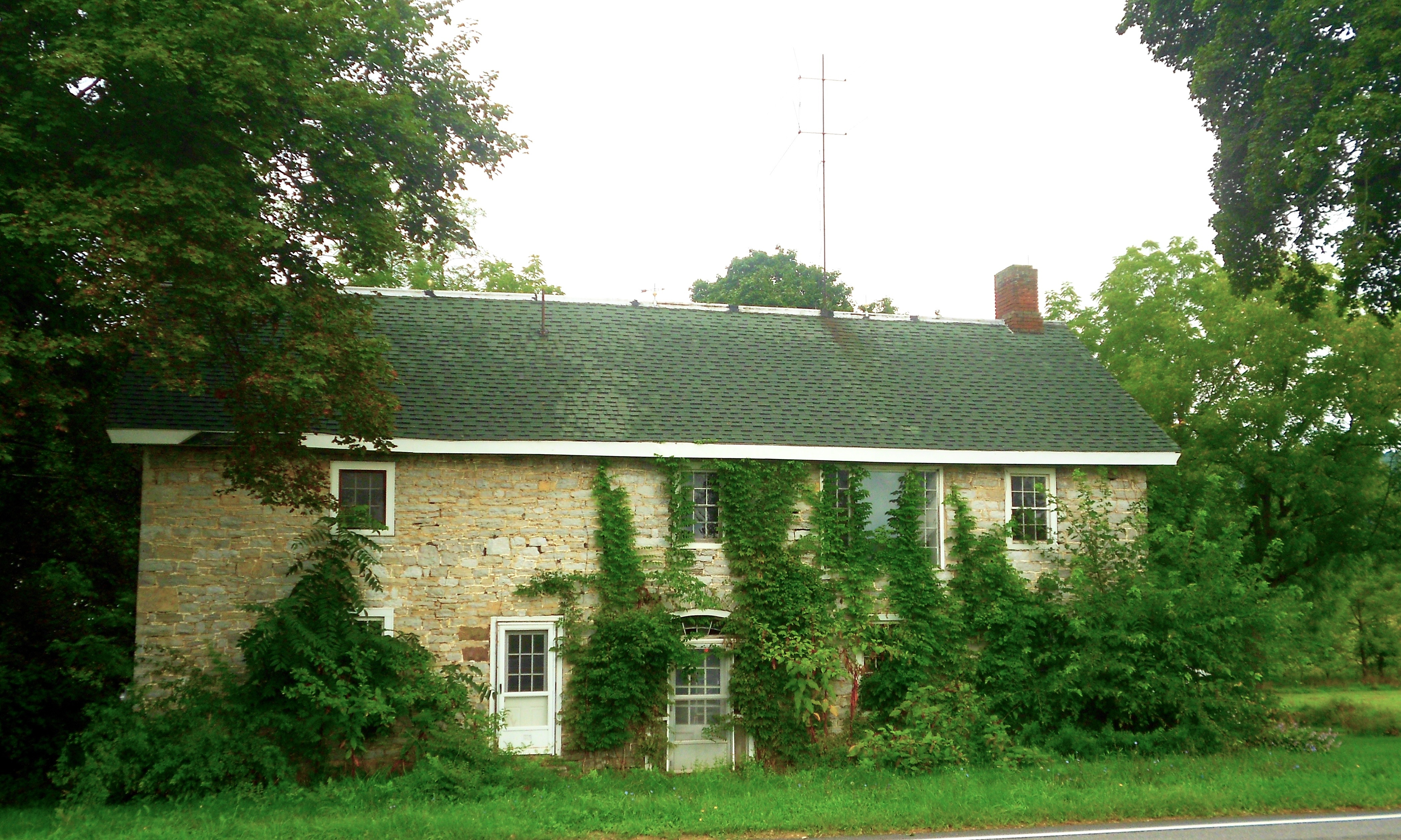
- 1808 section is on the left

- Location within Pennsylvania Location within the United States
- Location: Pennsylvania Route 550 at Stormstown, Halfmoon Township, Pennsylvania
- Coordinates: 40°47′43″N 78°0′46″W
- Area: 0.1 acres (0.040 ha)
- Built: 1808, 1832
- NRHP reference No.: 77001148
- Added to NRHP: April 13, 1977

Abraham Elder Stone House is a historic home located at Halfmoon Township, Centre County, Pennsylvania. The first section was built in 1808 and a second phase of construction took place in 1832. It is a 2 1/2-story, five bay limestone building. The center entrance features an elliptical stone arch with a fanlight, and a door with sidelights. The house served as a tavern stand for many years on the Bellefonte-Pittsburgh Turnpike.

Abraham Elder was one of the first settlers in Half Moon. He came from Franklin County in 1784, finding an abandoned cabin and staying there for the summer. The following fall, Elder returned to his wife Susanna (née Ardery) and two children in Franklin County, and they returned in the spring of 1785, along with Elder's brother, David. He built a log cabin afterward, before it was replaced with the present stone structure.

It was added to the National Register of Historic Places in 1977.

== Gallery ==
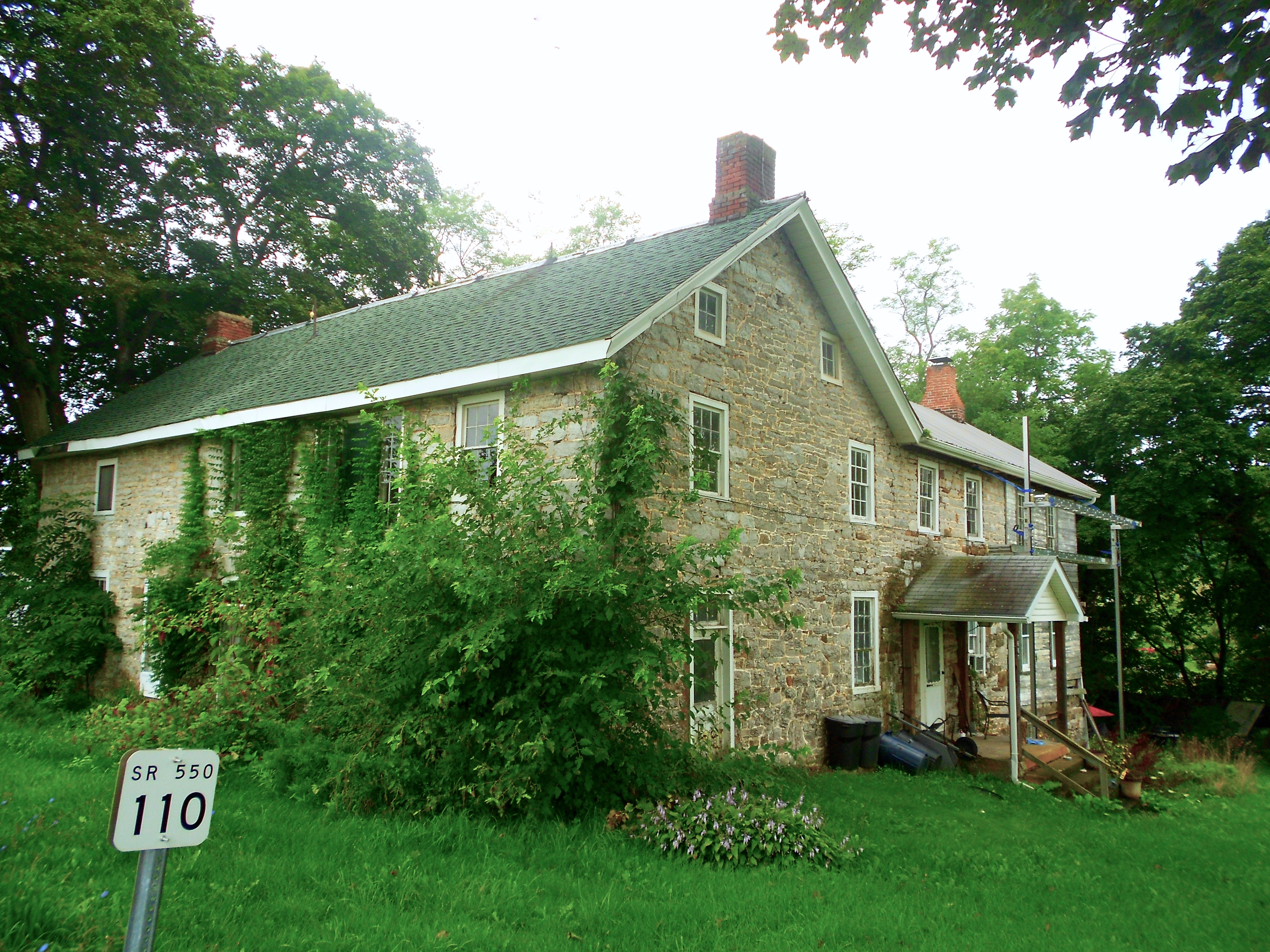
Looking north, showing the 1832 section
