= District No. 44 School =

- U.S. National Register of Historic Places
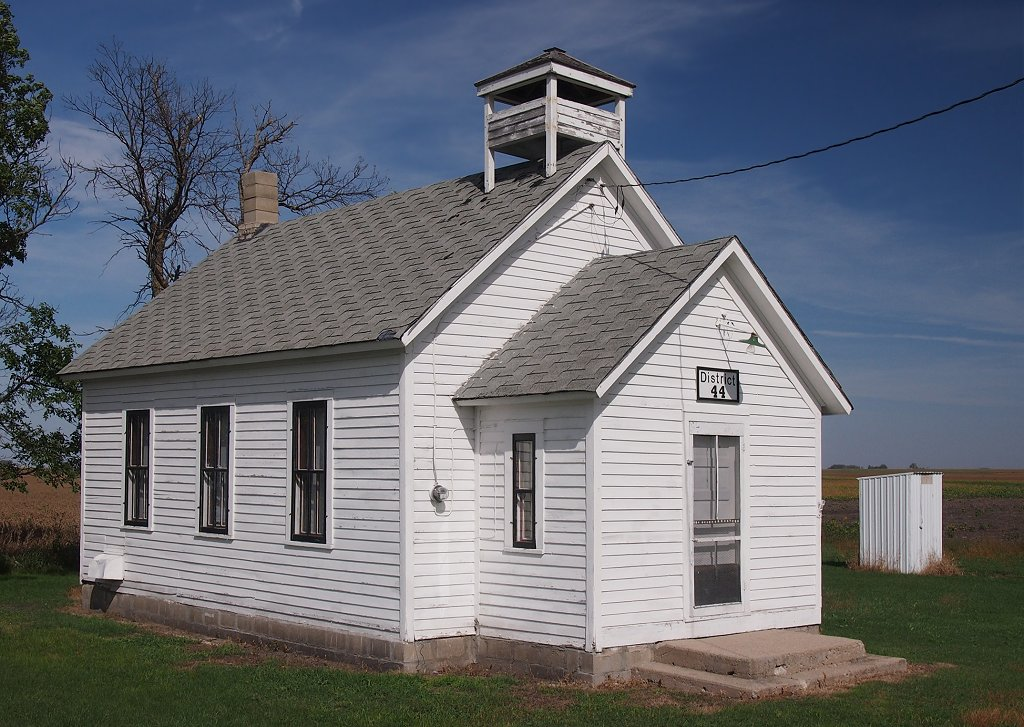
- District No. 44 School from the southwest

- Location within Minnesota Location within the United States
- Location: U.S. Route 75, Taylor Township, Minnesota
- Coordinates: 46°0′2″N 96°29′35.3″W
- Area: 1 acre (0.40 ha)
- Built: 1891
- NRHP reference No.: 11000470
- Designated: July 20, 2011

District No. 44 School is a historic one-room school in Taylor Township, Minnesota, United States. It was built in 1891 and used until 1954. The school building was listed on the National Register of Historic Places in 2011 for having local significance in the theme of education. It was nominated for being a well-preserved example of the one-room schoolhouses once common in rural Traverse County.

== Description ==
District No. 44 School is a one-story frame building on a concrete block foundation. The central room is about 26 feet (7.9 m) by 18 feet (5.5 m). Projecting from the front of the building is a 6-by-12-foot (1.8 by 3.7 m) vestibule. At the rear is an 8-by-12-foot (2.4 by 3.7 m) coal shed, added in 1914. The main room and the vestibule each have a gable roof while the rear section has a simple shed roof. Asphalt shingles cover all three. The school's main section is topped by a small belfry at the front and a concrete block chimney at the rear.

The building has wood clapboard siding, painted white. The primary entrance is centered on the vestibule. There are three sash windows on either side wall of the main room and a single narrow window on either flank of the vestibule.

As of 2011 the school's interior has been preserved and restored to show its original function. The vestibule contains coathooks and a few shelves for students' lunchboxes, as well as a wash basin. Early-to-mid-20th-century desks, wood benches along the sidewalls, and the original blackboards from 1891 still decorate the classroom. The wood floor and wainscoting are original to the building, while the upper walls and ceiling were modified in the 20th century. At the head of the classroom the teacher's desk is an antique from a different school, acquired in recent years, but behind it is the school's original map cabinet with maps dated 1892. Nearby is a fuel oil stove, which replaced an earlier coal-burning stove. A door in the north wall leads to the coal shed, which also contains a narrow cabinet once used to store art supplies. The rear of the classroom includes a cabinet added in the 1920s to house the school's library. A ceiling hatch nearby leads to an attic space, which includes a rope bell pull for the belfry.

Neither of the original two outhouses has survived, and the outhouse presently standing to the east of the school is a more recent structure not considered a contributing property to the National Register listing.

== Establishment ==
Little specific information survives regarding the initial establishment of District No. 44 School. The number 44 had been used previously for a Traverse County school district, but it is unclear if it was located in Taylor Township or elsewhere before closing sometime prior to 1888. In 1891, however, an act of legislature reassigned the number to a new school to be built in Section 8 of Taylor Township. At that time the township had a population of 263 people. The building materials were delivered to the site but, for lack of available carpenters, hadn't been assembled as of mid-November that year. The little school was definitely complete and operating by April 1892, though, when the county's school superintendent wrote about how well it was progressing.

The schoolhouse was built on a standard design distinguished by its gable-roofed vestibule. Two other school buildings in Traverse County and at least five more elsewhere in Minnesota use a nearly identical plan.

== Use ==
Like typical one-room schools, District No. 44 contained grades one through eight taught by a single teacher. District No. 44's inaugural school year of 1891–92 began with 18 students and a veteran teacher named Mr. Sansburn. Though the area's rural schools could range from as few as five to as many as 40 students, a student body numbering in the teens or twenties was most common. They would usually range from eight to 16 years old, but could be allowed as young as five and as old as 21.

Typical practises at the school involved a longer recess for first graders while the older students tackled advanced subjects like algebra and Shakespeare. Group singing was also common. Students who misbehaved were made to stay after school and clean the blackboards. A former student recalled having to memorize The Song of Hiawatha, drowning gophers in their burrows during recess, and dreading using the outhouse in winter. There was no well on the school grounds, so students took turns bringing water each day. The school had a very small library and the arrival of even a few new titles was cause for great excitement. Every Friday, the last period of the day was devoted to industrial arts, and many of the students' woodworking, fabric projects, and posters were entered into competition at the county fair.

District No. 44 School also served as a community venue, hosting such events as school plays, picnics, and political meetings.

== Later history ==
In the mid-1940s the building was moved about 50 feet (15 m) to the east—and rotated from its original orientation—to accommodate the widening of what is now U.S. Route 75. During this process the building was placed on railroad ties until a new foundation could be built in spring. Students that year recalled holding their feet up as much as possible because the floor was so cold.

However the days of one-room schoolhouses scattered across rural America were drawing to a close. Education officials and politicians were pushing for consolidation into fewer, larger schools. They argued that small rural schools were inefficient and substandard, though their actual attendees rarely considered them lacking. Minnesota had been gradually pushing for school consolidation throughout the early 20th century. In 1911 there were about 7,900 school districts in the state, of which 2,000 had fewer than 21 students. That number had only dropped to 7,600 by 1947, but in Traverse County, for example, 18 of its 60 school districts had already closed their schools and were busing the students to other districts.

Although Taylor Township's population remained steady, District No. 44 was closed in 1954. Its last teacher was Marieta Maudal. The following year the township purchased the building for use as a meeting hall. It was still being used as a meeting hall at the time of the building's National Register nomination in 2011. Moreover, volunteers had recently rehabilitated the deteriorating structure. Each year many local students take field trips to the schoolhouse for a glimpse of how education used to be delivered.

== See also ==
- National Register of Historic Places listings in Traverse County, Minnesota
