= Sugar Bush Township, Beltrami County, Minnesota =

Sugar Bush Township, Minnesota
- Township
- Location of Sugar Bush Township, within Beltrami County, Minnesota
- Coordinates: 47°32′31″N 94°36′13″W
- Country: United States
- State: Minnesota
- County: Beltrami

Area
  - Total: 35.1 sq mi (90.9 km^{2})
  - Land: 29.6 sq mi (76.6 km^{2})
  - Water: 5.5 sq mi (14.3 km^{2})
- Elevation: 1,319 ft (402 m)

Population (2020)
  - Total: 228
  - Density: 7.71/sq mi (2.98/km^{2})
- Time zone: UTC-6 (Central (CST))
  - Summer (DST): UTC-5 (CDT)
- ZIP code: 56601
- Area code: 218
- FIPS code: 27-63274
- GNIS feature ID: 0665733
- Website: http://www.sugarbushtwp.us/

Sugar Bush Township is a township in Beltrami County, Minnesota, United States. The population was 228 as of the 2020 census.

Sugar Bush Township was named for the sugar maple trees.

== Geography ==
According to the United States Census Bureau, the township has a total area of 35.1 square miles (90.9 km^{2}), of which 29.6 square miles (76.6 km^{2}) is land and 5.5 square miles (14.3 km^{2}) (15.73%) is water.

=== Lakes ===
- Big Lake (north three-quarters)
- Big Rice Lake (west three-quarters)
- Jessie Lake
- Lake Flora
- Long Lake (east edge)
- Meadow Lake
- Pimushe Lake (west edge)
- Roadside Lake (east half)
- S Twin Lake (south quarter)

=== Adjacent townships ===
- Taylor Township (north)
- Birch Township (northeast)
- Moose Lake Township (east)
- Ten Lake Township (south)
- Frohn Township (southwest)
- Turtle River Township (west)
- Port Hope Township (northwest)

=== Cemeteries ===
The township contains Sugar Bush Township Cemetery.

== Demographics ==
Historical population
Census	Pop.	Note	%±
1900	6		—
1910	27		350.0%
1920	78		188.9%
1930	95		21.8%
1940	100		5.3%
1950	104		4.0%
1960	85		−18.3%
1970	53		−37.6%
1980	121		128.3%
1990	113		−6.6%
2000	193		70.8%
2010	247		28.0%
2020	228		−7.7%
U.S. Decennial Census

As of the census of 2000, there were 193 people, 70 households, and 49 families residing in the township. The population density was 6.5 people per square mile (2.5/km^{2}). There were 114 housing units at an average density of 3.9/sq mi (1.5/km^{2}). The racial makeup of the township was 70.98% White, 26.42% Native American, 1.55% Asian, and 1.04% from two or more races.

There were 70 households, out of which 25.7% had children under the age of 18 living with them, 55.7% were married couples living together, 11.4% had a female householder with no husband present, and 28.6% were non-families. 20.0% of all households were made up of individuals, and 7.1% had someone living alone who was 65 years of age or older. The average household size was 2.76 and the average family size was 3.00.

In the township the population was spread out, with 24.4% under the age of 18, 11.4% from 18 to 24, 21.8% from 25 to 44, 30.6% from 45 to 64, and 11.9% who were 65 years of age or older. The median age was 41 years. For every 100 females, there were 107.5 males. For every 100 females age 18 and over, there were 102.8 males.

The median income for a household in the township was $28,542, and the median income for a family was $27,917. Males had a median income of $27,083 versus $18,333 for females. The per capita income for the township was $10,082. About 26.8% of families and 29.1% of the population were below the poverty line, including 25.0% of those under the age of eighteen and none of those 65 or over.
