= Evans Landing, Indiana =

Unincorporated community in Indiana, United States

Coordinates: 38.00424°N 85.98469°W

Evans Landing was an unincorporated community in Taylor Township, Harrison County, Indiana, in the United States.

== History ==
Evans Landing contained a post office from 1870 until 1947. William M. Evans served as an early postmaster. The community was washed away in 1937, leaving a single residence.
