= Fishtown, Indiana =

Unincorporated community in Indiana, United States

- Unincorporated community
- Harrison County's location in Indiana

- Fishtown's location in Harrison County
- Coordinates: 38°04′10″N 85°55′03″W
- Country: United States
- State: Indiana
- County: Harrison
- Township: Taylor
- Elevation: 479 ft (146 m)
- ZIP code: 47117
- FIPS code: 18-23395
- GNIS feature ID: 434532

Fishtown is an unincorporated community in Taylor Township, Harrison County, Indiana.

== History ==
A post office was established at Fishtown in 1904, and remained in operation until it was discontinued in 1907.
