= Taylor Township, Beltrami County, Minnesota =

Taylor Township, Minnesota
- Township
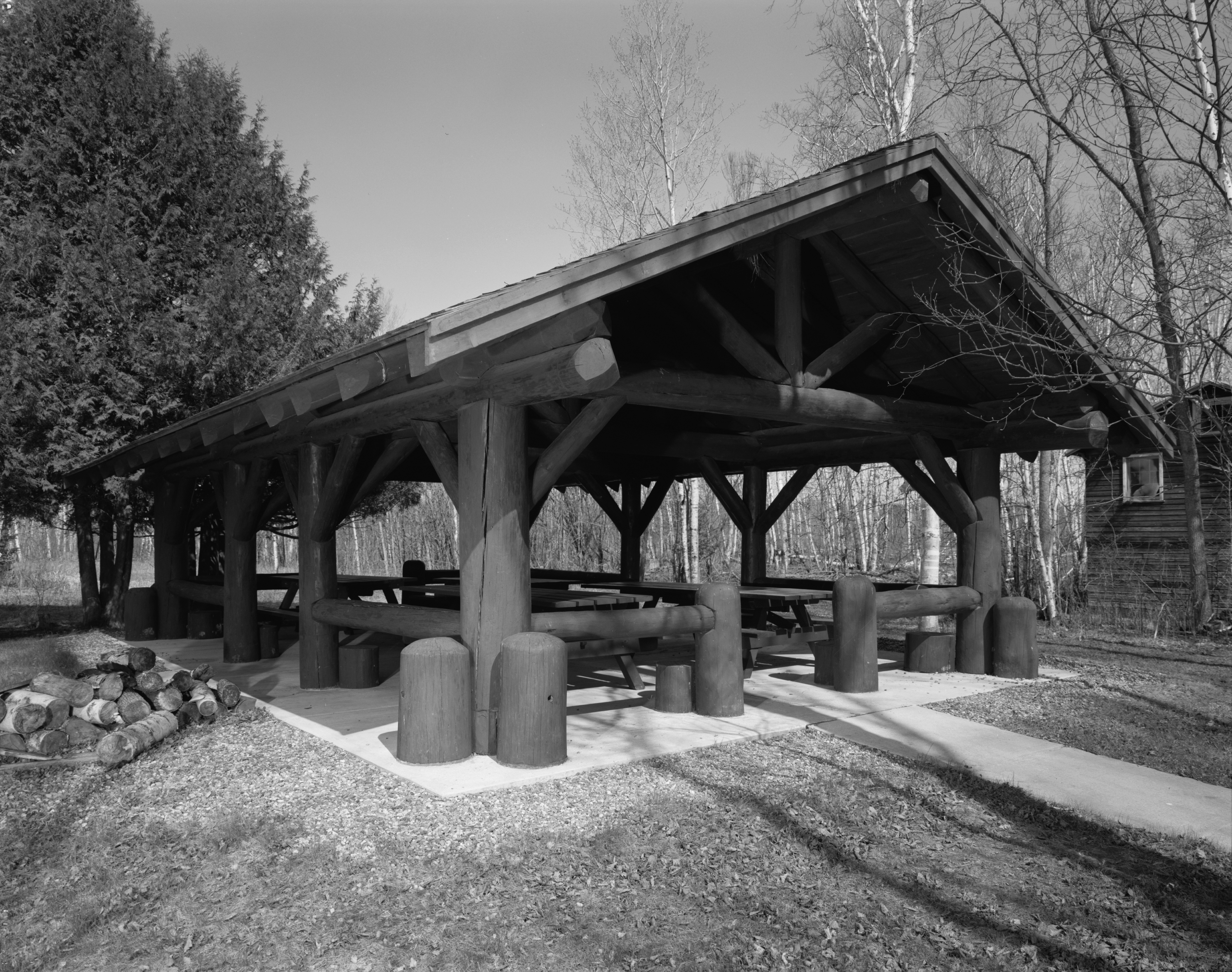

- Location of Taylor Township, within Beltrami County, Minnesota
- Coordinates: 47°36′36″N 94°36′45″W
- Country: United States
- State: Minnesota
- County: Beltrami

Area
  - Total: 34.2 sq mi (88.6 km^{2})
  - Land: 32.2 sq mi (83.3 km^{2})
  - Water: 2.0 sq mi (5.3 km^{2})
- Elevation: 1,319 ft (402 m)

Population (2020)
  - Total: 113
  - Density: 3.51/sq mi (1.36/km^{2})
- Time zone: UTC-6 (Central (CST))
  - Summer (DST): UTC-5 (CDT)
- FIPS code: 27-64291
- GNIS feature ID: 0665767

Taylor Township is a township in Beltrami County, Minnesota, United States. The population was 113 as of the 2020 census.

Taylor Township was named for James Taylor, an early settler.

== Geography ==
According to the United States Census Bureau, the township has a total area of 34.2 square miles (88.7 km^{2}), of which 32.2 square miles (83.3 km^{2}) is land and 2.1 square miles (5.3 km^{2}) (6.02%) is water.

The east quarter of the city of Tenstrike is within this township geographically but is a separate entity.

=== Lakes ===
- Bass Lake
- Cacia Lake
- Carter Lake
- Drury Lake
- Dutchman Lake (south half)
- Fagen Lake
- Gull Lake
- Hanson Lake (vast majority)
- Little Rabideau Lake
- Loon Lake
- N Twin Lake
- Nelson Lake
- Pimushe Lake (northwest edge)
- S Twin Lake (north three-quarters)

=== Adjacent townships ===
- Hines Township (north)
- Summit Township (northeast)
- Birch Township (east)
- Moose Lake Township (southeast)
- Sugar Bush Township (south)
- Turtle River Township (southwest)
- Port Hope Township (west)

== Demographics ==
Historical population
Census	Pop.	Note	%±
1910	179		—
1920	208		16.2%
1980	92		—
1990	133		44.6%
2000	108		−18.8%
2010	104		−3.7%
2020	113		8.7%
U.S. Decennial Census

As of the census of 2000, there were 108 people, 42 households, and 27 families residing in the township. The population density was 3.4 people per square mile (1.3/km^{2}). There were 66 housing units at an average density of 2.1/sq mi (0.8/km^{2}). The racial makeup of the township was 96.30% White, 2.78% African American and 0.93% Native American.

There were 42 households, out of which 28.6% had children under the age of 18 living with them, 59.5% were married couples living together, and 35.7% were non-families. 28.6% of all households were made up of individuals, and 11.9% had someone living alone who was 65 years of age or older. The average household size was 2.57 and the average family size was 3.30.

In the township the population was spread out, with 24.1% under the age of 18, 13.9% from 18 to 24, 20.4% from 25 to 44, 31.5% from 45 to 64, and 10.2% who were 65 years of age or older. The median age was 41 years. For every 100 females, there were 125.0 males. For every 100 females age 18 and over, there were 127.8 males.

The median income for a household in the township was $39,722, and the median income for a family was $41,875. Males had a median income of $29,375 versus $26,250 for females. The per capita income for the township was $18,946. There were 12.5% of families and 15.2% of the population living below the poverty line, including no under eighteens and none of those over 64.
