= Taylor Township, Traverse County, Minnesota =

Township in Minnesota, United States

Taylor Township, Minnesota
- Township
- Location within the state of Minnesota Taylor Township, Minnesota (the United States)
- Coordinates: 45°58′26″N 96°28′59″W
- Country: United States
- State: Minnesota
- County: Traverse

Area
  - Total: 52.0 sq mi (134.6 km^{2})
  - Land: 52.0 sq mi (134.6 km^{2})
  - Water: 0 sq mi (0.0 km^{2})
- Elevation: 994 ft (303 m)

Population (2000)
  - Total: 108
  - Density: 2.1/sq mi (0.8/km^{2})
- Time zone: UTC-6 (Central (CST))
  - Summer (DST): UTC-5 (CDT)
- FIPS code: 27-64300
- GNIS feature ID: 0665768

Taylor Township is a township in Traverse County, Minnesota, United States. The population was 108 at the 2000 census.

Taylor Township was organized in 1881, and named after an early settler. The 1891 District No. 44 School is listed on the National Register of Historic Places.

== Geography ==
According to the United States Census Bureau, the township has a total area of 52.0 square miles (134.6 km^{2}), all land.

== Demographics ==
As of the census of 2000, there were 108 people, 40 households, and 35 families residing in the township. The population density was 2.1 people per square mile (0.8/km^{2}). There were 46 housing units at an average density of 0.9/sq mi (0.3/km^{2}). The racial makeup of the township was 99.07% White, and 0.93% from two or more races.

There were 40 households, out of which 32.5% had children under the age of 18 living with them, 75.0% were married couples living together, 5.0% had a female householder with no husband present, and 12.5% were non-families. 12.5% of all households were made up of individuals, and 5.0% had someone living alone who was 65 years of age or older. The average household size was 2.70 and the average family size was 2.89.

In the township the population was spread out, with 26.9% under the age of 18, 3.7% from 18 to 24, 26.9% from 25 to 44, 23.1% from 45 to 64, and 19.4% who were 65 years of age or older. The median age was 38 years. For every 100 females, there were 103.8 males. For every 100 females age 18 and over, there were 113.5 males.

The median income for a household in the township was $28,750, and the median income for a family was $31,250. Males had a median income of $30,313 versus $26,250 for females. The per capita income for the township was $12,813. There were 25.0% of families and 25.2% of the population living below the poverty line, including 43.5% of under eighteens and 8.0% of those over 64.
