= Taylor Township, Harrison County, Indiana =

Taylor Township
- Township
- Coordinates: 38°03′13″N 85°57′36″W
- Country: United States
- State: Indiana
- County: Harrison

Government
  - Type: Indiana township

Area
  - Total: 28.15 sq mi (72.9 km^{2})
  - Land: 28.09 sq mi (72.8 km^{2})
  - Water: 0.06 sq mi (0.16 km^{2})
- Elevation: 823 ft (251 m)

Population (2020)
  - Total: 762
  - Density: 27.1/sq mi (10.5/km^{2})
- FIPS code: 18-75014
- GNIS feature ID: 453890

Taylor Township is one of twelve townships in Harrison County, Indiana. As of the 2020 census, its population was 762 and it contained 334 housing units.

Historical population
Census	Pop.	Note	%±
1890	1,231		—
1900	1,138		−7.6%
1910	904		−20.6%
1920	853		−5.6%
1930	660		−22.6%
1940	765		15.9%
1950	587		−23.3%
1960	566		−3.6%
1970	537		−5.1%
1980	611		13.8%
1990	576		−5.7%
2000	718		24.7%
2010	781		8.8%
2020	762		−2.4%
Source: US Decennial Census

== Geography ==
According to the 2010 census, the township has a total area of 28.15 square miles (72.9 km^{2}), of which 28.09 square miles (72.8 km^{2}) (or 99.79%) is land and 0.06 square miles (0.16 km^{2}) (or 0.21%) is water.

=== Unincorporated towns ===
- Buena Vista
- Elbert
- Evans Landing
- Fishtown
- Happy Hollow
- New Boston
- Rosewood

(This list is based on USGS data and may include former settlements.)
