= Taylor Township, Centre County, Pennsylvania =

Township in Pennsylvania, US

Coordinates: 40.79°N 78.12°W

- Township
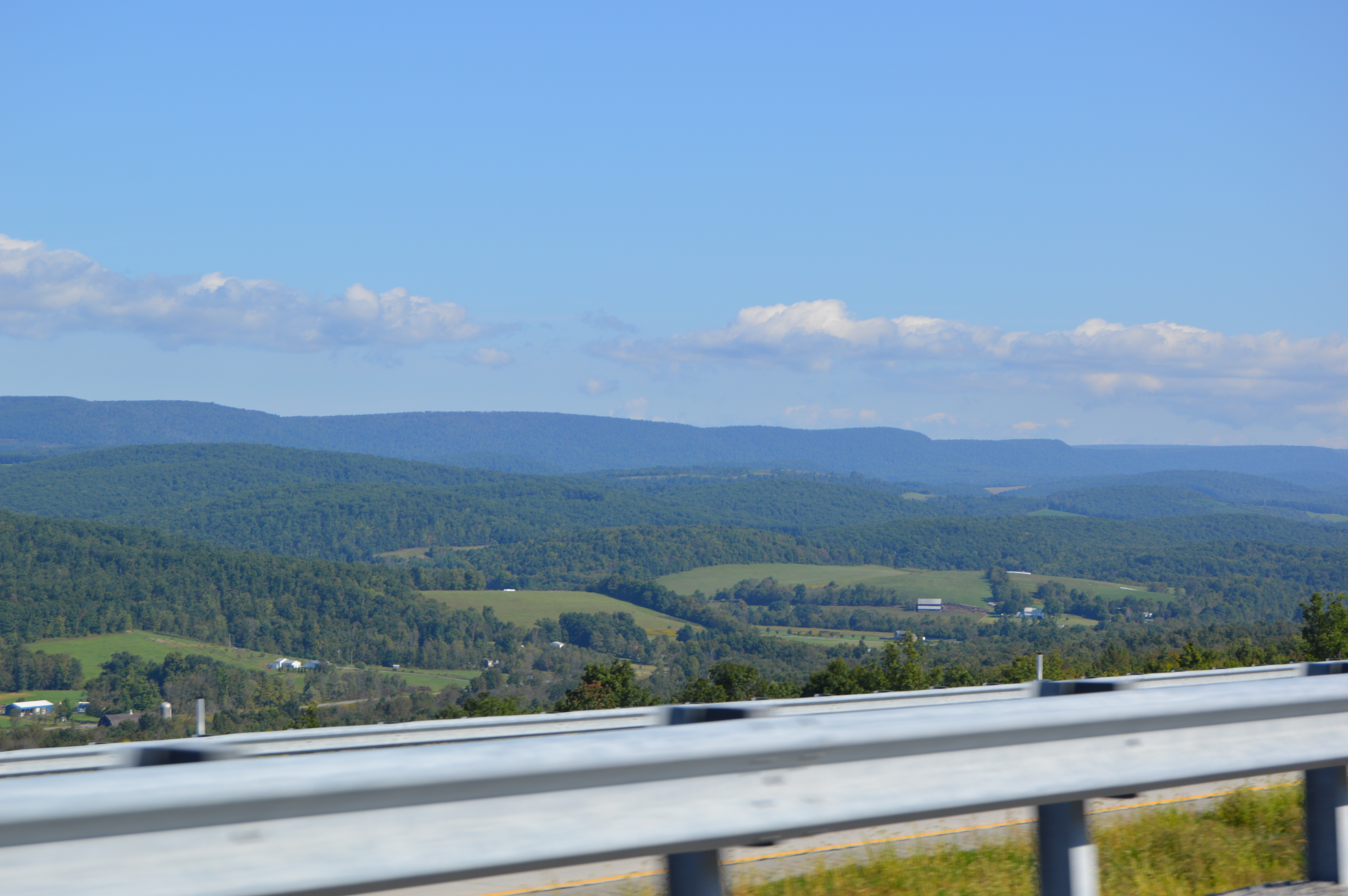
- Looking northwest from Interstate 99 on Bald Eagle Mountain

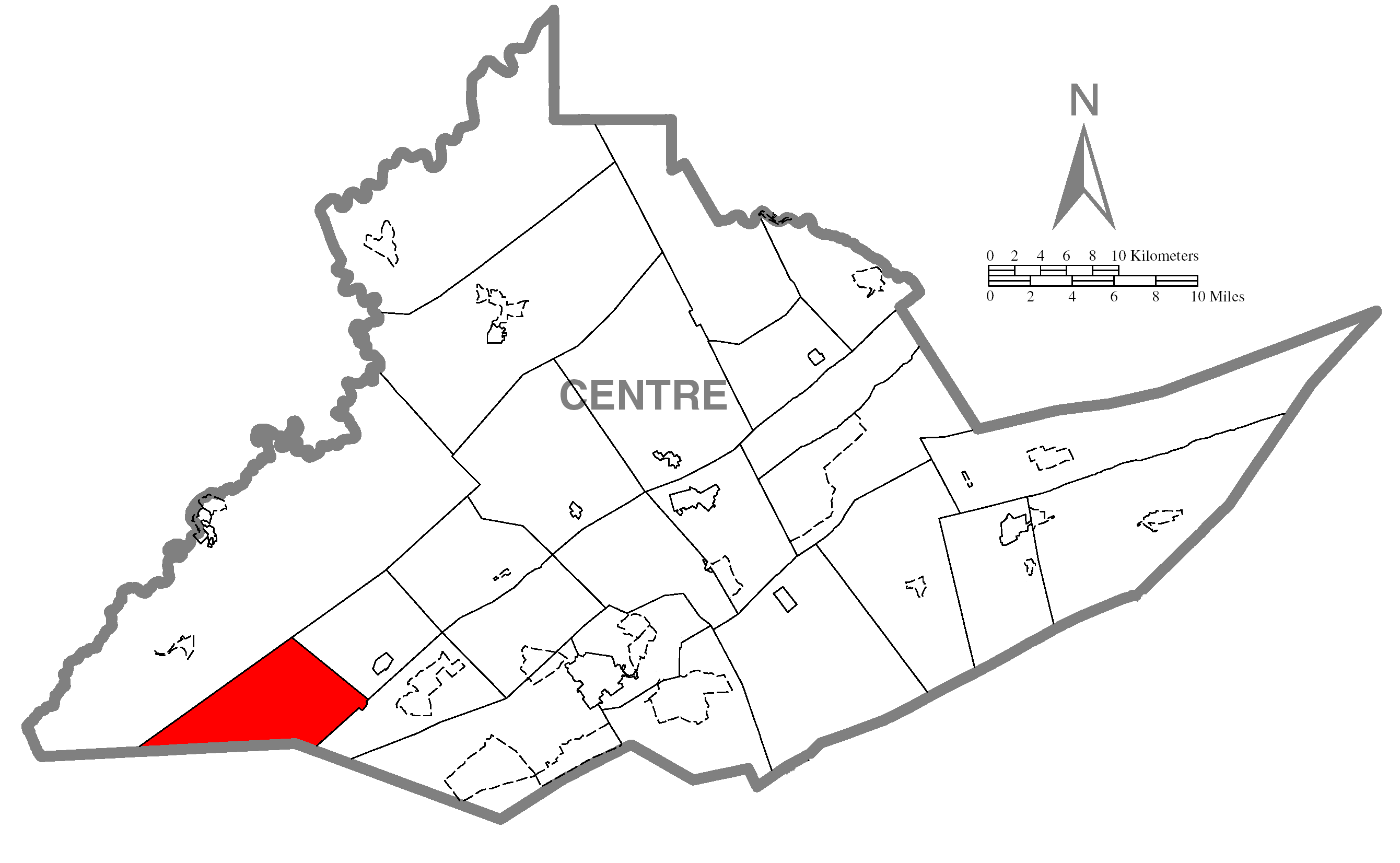
- Map of Centre County, Pennsylvania highlighting Taylor Township

- Map of Centre County, Pennsylvania
- Country: United States
- State: Pennsylvania
- County: Centre
- Settled: 1790
- Incorporated: 1847

Area
  - Total: 30.75 sq mi (79.65 km^{2})
  - Land: 30.75 sq mi (79.65 km^{2})
  - Water: 0 sq mi (0.00 km^{2})

Population (2020)
  - Total: 853
  - Estimate (2021): 850
  - Density: 28.0/sq mi (10.81/km^{2})
- FIPS code: 42-027-76168

Taylor Township is a township in Centre County, Pennsylvania, United States. It is part of the State College, Pennsylvania Metropolitan Statistical Area. The population was 853 at the 2020 census, no change from the figure tabulated in 2010.

== Geography ==
According to the United States Census Bureau, the township has a total area of 30.8 square miles (79.7 km^{2}), all land.

Taylor Township is bordered by Rush Township to the northwest, Worth Township to the northeast, Halfmoon Township to the east and Blair County to the south.

== Demographics ==
Historical population
Census	Pop.	Note	%±
2000	741		—
2010	853		15.1%
2020	853		0.0%
2021 (est.)	850		−0.4%
U.S. Decennial Census

As of the census of 2000, there were 741 people, 292 households, and 223 families residing in the township. The population density was 24.4 people per square mile (9.4/km^{2}). There were 333 housing units at an average density of 10.9/sq mi (4.2/km^{2}). The racial makeup of the township was 99.19% White, 0.13% African American, 0.13% Asian, and 0.54% from two or more races. Hispanic or Latino of any race were 0.27% of the population.

There were 292 households, out of which 31.5% had children under the age of 18 living with them, 62.3% were married couples living together, 8.2% had a female householder with no husband present, and 23.3% were non-families. 18.8% of all households were made up of individuals, and 6.2% had someone living alone who was 65 years of age or older. The average household size was 2.53 and the average family size was 2.83.

In the township the population was spread out, with 22.3% under the age of 18, 8.0% from 18 to 24, 31.0% from 25 to 44, 27.9% from 45 to 64, and 10.8% who were 65 years of age or older. The median age was 38 years. For every 100 females, there were 103.6 males. For every 100 females age 18 and over, there were 101.4 males.

The median income for a household in the township was $40,192, and the median income for a family was $43,977. Males had a median income of $32,857 versus $25,313 for females. The per capita income for the township was $17,994. About 9.3% of families and 11.8% of the population were below the poverty line, including 19.9% of those under age 18 and 12.0% of those age 65 or over.

== Recreation ==
Portions of the Pennsylvania State Game Lands Number 60 are located along the northern border of the township.

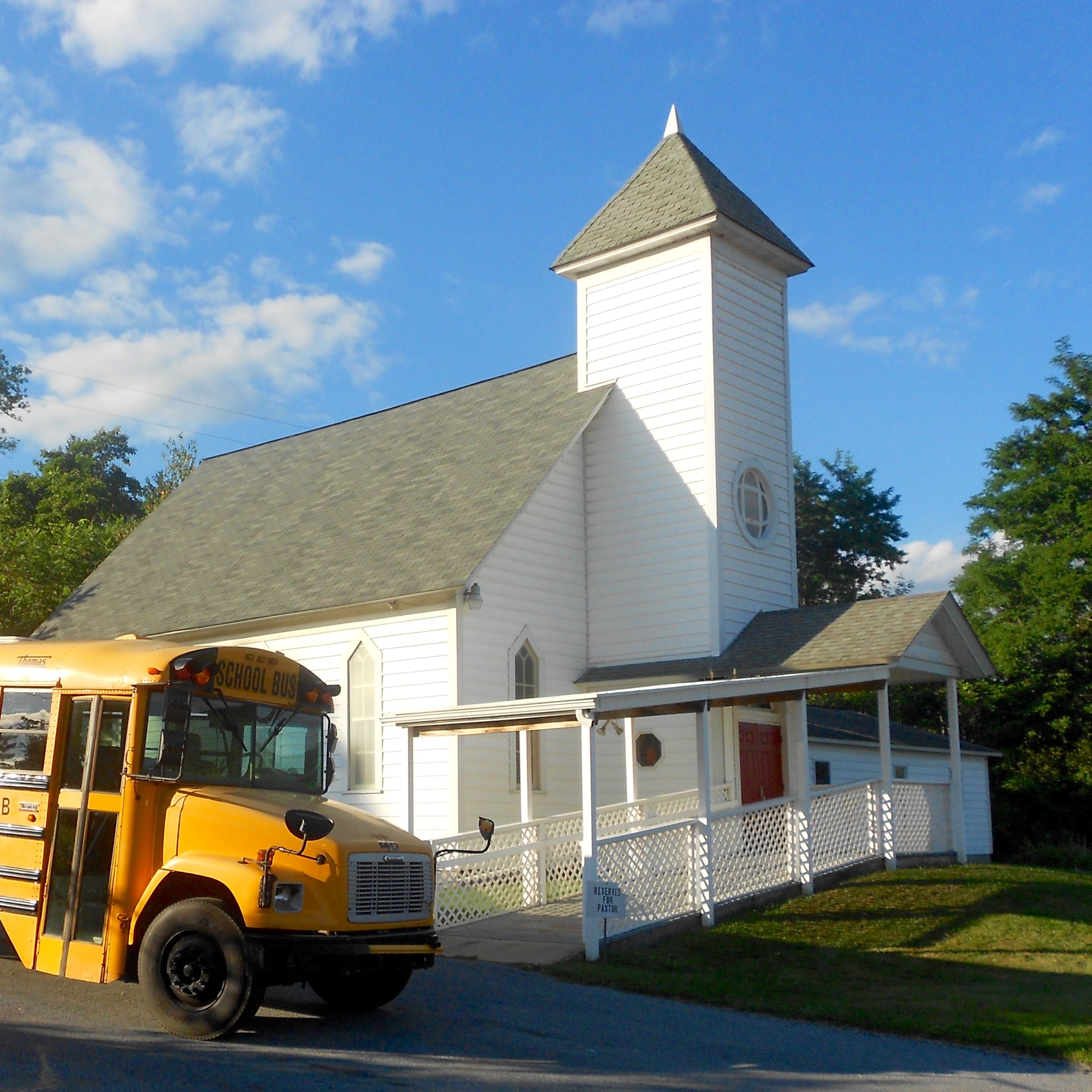
Hannah United Methodist Church

== History ==
The Hannah Iron Furnace was in operation along Bald Eagle Creek in Hannah from 1830 to 1850.
