= Third River Township, Itasca County, Minnesota =

Third River Township, Minnesota
- Township
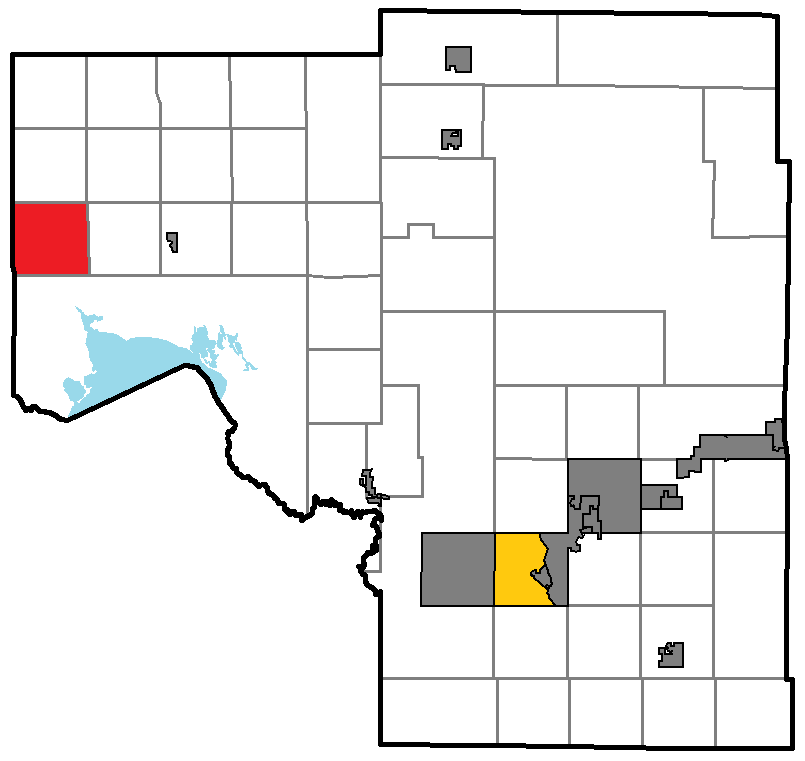
- Location of Third River Township, within Itasca County, Minnesota
- Coordinates: 47°37′35″N 94°19′0″W
- Country: United States
- State: Minnesota
- County: Itasca

Area
  - Total: 36.3 sq mi (94.1 km^{2})
  - Land: 34.9 sq mi (90.5 km^{2})
  - Water: 1.4 sq mi (3.7 km^{2})
- Elevation: 1,332 ft (406 m)

Population (2020)
  - Total: 50
  - Density: 1.4/sq mi (0.55/km^{2})
- Time zone: UTC-6 (Central (CST))
  - Summer (DST): UTC-5 (CDT)
- FIPS code: 27-64606
- GNIS feature ID: 0665780

Third River Township is a township in Itasca County, Minnesota, United States. The population was 50 at the 2020 census.

This township took its name from the Third River.

== Geography ==
According to the United States Census Bureau, the township has a total area of 36.3 square miles (94.1 km^{2}), of which 34.9 square miles (90.5 km^{2}) is land and 1.4 square miles (3.7 km^{2}), or 3.91%, is water.

== Demographics ==
As of the census of 2000, there were 65 people, 32 households, and 20 families living in the township. The population density was 1.9 people per square mile (0.7/km^{2}). There were 80 housing units at an average density of 2.3/sq mi (0.9/km^{2}). The racial makeup of the township was 90.77% White, 6.15% Native American, and 3.08% from two or more races.

There were 32 households, out of which 18.8% had children under the age of 18 living with them, 50.0% were married couples living together, 3.1% had a female householder with no husband present, and 37.5% were non-families. 31.3% of all households were made up of individuals, and 21.9% had someone living alone who was 65 years of age or older. The average household size was 2.03 and the average family size was 2.45.

In the township the population was spread out, with 12.3% under the age of 18, 6.2% from 18 to 24, 20.0% from 25 to 44, 36.9% from 45 to 64, and 24.6% who were 65 years of age or older. The median age was 52 years. For every 100 females, there were 97.0 males. For every 100 females age 18 and over, there were 96.6 males.

The median income for a household in the township was $30,750, and the median income for a family was $38,333. Males had a median income of $22,083 versus $11,667 for females. The per capita income for the township was $16,679. There were 13.6% of families and 13.8% of the population living below the poverty line, including no under eighteens and 11.1% of those over 64.
