= Farden Township, Hubbard County, Minnesota =

Farden Township, Minnesota
- Township
- Location of Farden Township, within Hubbard County, Minnesota
- Coordinates: 47°22′33″N 94°43′13″W
- Country: United States
- State: Minnesota
- County: Hubbard

Area
  - Total: 36.2 sq mi (93.7 km^{2})
  - Land: 33.7 sq mi (87.2 km^{2})
  - Water: 2.5 sq mi (6.5 km^{2})
- Elevation: 1,339 ft (408 m)

Population (2020)
  - Total: 1,145
  - Density: 34.0/sq mi (13.1/km^{2})
- Time zone: UTC-6 (Central (CST))
  - Summer (DST): UTC-5 (CDT)
- FIPS code: 27-20528
- GNIS feature ID: 0664142

Farden Township is a township in Hubbard County, Minnesota, United States. The population was 1,145 at the 2020 census.

Farden Township was named for Ole J. Farden, an early Norwegian settler.

== Geography ==
According to the United States Census Bureau, the township has a total area of 36.2 square miles (94 km^{2}), of which 33.7 square miles (87 km^{2}) is land and 2.5 square miles (6.5 km^{2}) (6.94%) is water.

== Demographics ==
As of the census of 2000, there were 994 people, 358 households, and 277 families residing in the township. The population density was 29.5 inhabitants per square mile (11.4/km^{2}). There were 510 housing units at an average density of 15.1 per square mile (5.8/km^{2}). The racial makeup of the township was 86.92% White, 0.20% African American, 10.36% Native American, 0.10% Asian, 0.30% from other races, and 2.11% from two or more races. Hispanic or Latino of any race were 0.20% of the population.

There were 358 households, out of which 38.3% had children under the age of 18 living with them, 63.4% were married couples living together, 9.8% had a female householder with no husband present, and 22.6% were non-families. 17.0% of all households were made up of individuals, and 6.7% had someone living alone who was 65 years of age or older. The average household size was 2.78 and the average family size was 3.13.

In the township the population was spread out, with 29.9% under the age of 18, 7.5% from 18 to 24, 29.6% from 25 to 44, 21.4% from 45 to 64, and 11.6% who were 65 years of age or older. The median age was 34 years. For every 100 females, there were 101.6 males. For every 100 females age 18 and over, there were 100.3 males.

The median income for a household in the township was $41,842, and the median income for a family was $44,688. Males had a median income of $30,179 versus $25,833 for females. The per capita income for the township was $16,642. About 5.7% of families and 8.3% of the population were below the poverty line, including 8.5% of those under age 18 and 14.3% of those age 65 or over.
