= List of county roads in Beltrami County, Minnesota =

- Standard county road marker

Highway names
- Interstates: Interstate X (I-X)
- US Highways: U.S. Highway X (US X)
- State: Trunk Highway X (MN X or TH X)
- County State-Aid Highways: County State-Aid Highway X (CSAH X)
- County Roads: County Road X (CR X)

System links
- County roads of Minnesota; Beltrami County

The following is a list of county-maintained roads in Beltrami County, Minnesota, United States. Some of the routes included in this list are also county-state-aid-highways (CSAH.)

== Route list ==
Number	Length (mi)	Length (km)	Southern or western terminus	Northern or eastern terminus	Local names	Formed	Removed	Notes
CSAH 1	—	—	Marshall County line (County 54)	Roseau County line (County 9)		—	—	
CSAH 2	—	—	Hubbard County line (County 35)	US 2 in Bemidji Township		—	—	
CSAH 3	9.5	15.3	US 2 in Lammers Township	Clearwater County line (County 17)	Clearline Rd	—	—	
CSAH 4	—	—	US 2 in Bemidji Township	Hubbard County line (County 46)		—	—	
CSAH 5	25	40	Hubbard County line (County 27)	CSAH 32 in Roosevelt Township	Centerline Rd	—	—	
CSAH 6	—	—	CSAH 11 in Bemidji	Norton Avenue Northwest in Bemidji		—	—	
CSAH 7	—	—	CSAH 48 in Grant Valley Township	CSAH 11 in Bemidji	Becida Rd	—	—	
CSAH 8	—	—	Paul Bunyan Drive Southeast in Bemidji	Cass County line (County 75)	Roosevelt Rd	—	—	
CSAH 9	—	—	US 2 in Bemidji	CSAH 26 in Liberty Township	Cardinal Rd	—	—	
CSAH 10	2.5	4.0	Clearwater County line (County 29)	CSAH 5 in Jones Township	Fredenburg Road	—	—	
CSAH 11	—	—	CSAH 50 in Bemidji	US 2 in Bemidji		—	—	
CSAH 12	—	—	1st Street East in Bemidji	CSAH 39 in Brook Lake Unorganized Territory		—	—	
CSAH 13	—	—	CSAH 26 in Durand Township	CSAH 32 in Nebish Township		—	—	
CSAH 14	—	—	US 2 in Wilton	CSAH 7 in Grant Valley Township		—	—	
CSAH 15	—	—	CSAH 52 in Bemidji	South Boundary Road in Nebish Township		—	—	
CSAH 16	5.5	8.9	CSAH 5 in Jones Township	CSAH 14 in Grant Valley Township	Trengove Rd	—	—	
CSAH 17	—	—	29th Street Northeast in Bemidji	CSAH 21 in Northern Township		—	—	
CSAH 19	—	—	CSAH 12 in Bemidji	CSAH 20 in Northern Township		—	—	
CSAH 20	—	—	CSAH 21 in Northern Township	CSAH 39 in Moose Lake Township	Birchmont Beach Rd	—	—	
CSAH 21	—	—	MN 197 in Bemidji	US 71 in Port Hope Township		—	—	
CSAH 22	—	—	CSAH 3 in Buzzle Township	CSAH 39 in Birch Township		—	—	
CSAH 23	—	—	US 71 in Port Hope Township	MN 72 in Wakish Township		—	—	
CSAH 24	—	—	Clearwater County line (County 3)	MN 89 in Liberty Township	Aure Rd	—	—	
CSAH 25	—	—	CSAH 4 in Frohn Township	CSAH 8 in Frohn Township	Wolf Lake Rd	—	—	
CSAH 26	—	—	MN 89 in Maple Ridge Township	CSAH 15 in Durand Township	Great Divide Rd	—	—	
CSAH 27	—	—	CSAH 8 in Frohn Township	CSAH 22 in Turtle River Township		—	—	
CSAH 29	—	—	CSAH 43 in Tenstrike	CSAH 23 in Hagali Township		—	—	
CSAH 30	—	—	CSAH 31 in Hines Township	Itasca County line (County 13)		—	—	
CSAH 31	—	—	US 71 in Hines Township	CSAH 32 in Hines Township	Hines Rd	—	—	
CSAH 32	—	—	Clearwater County line (County 4)	MN 72 in Langor Township		—	—	
CSAH 33	—	—	CSAH 8 in Ten Lake Township	CSAH 12 in Ten Lake Township		—	—	
CSAH 34	—	—	CSAH 23 in Woodrow Township	CSAH 36 in Woodrow Township		—	—	
CSAH 35	—	—	US 71 in Hines Township	CSAH 30 in Hines Township	Pass Rd	—	—	
CSAH 36	—	—	MN 1 and MN 72 in Shooks Township	Koochiching County line (County 36)		—	—	
CSAH 37	—	—	CSAH 32 in Langor Township	MN 1 in Cormant Township		—	—	
CSAH 38	—	—	CSAH 23 in Woodrow Township	CSAH 36 in Kelliher Township		—	—	
CSAH 39	—	—	Cass County line (County 10)	CSAH 47 in Blackduck	Scenic Highway	—	—	
CSAH 41	—	—	US 71 in Summit Township	MN 72 in Hornet Township		—	—	
CSAH 43	—	—	US 71 in Port Hope Township	US 71 in Tenstrike		—	—	
CSAH 44	—	—	Marshall County line (County 55)	CSAH 23 in Shotley Township		—	—	
CSAH 46	—	—	Jackson Avenue Southwest in Bemidji Township	US 71 in Bemidji Township		—	—	
CSAH 47	—	—	US 71 in Blackduck	MN 72 in Langor Township		—	—	
CSAH 48	—	—	CSAH 7 in Grant Valley Township	CSAH 2 in Grant Valley Township		—	—	
CSAH 50	—	—	US 2 in Bemidji Township	Miles Avenue Southeast in Bemidji		—	—	
CSAH 52	—	—	US 71 in Bemidji	CSAH 21 in Northern Township		—	—	
CSAH 54	—	—	Cass County line (County 91)	Cass County line		—	—	
CSAH 55	—	—	CSAH 31 in Hines Township	CSAH 39 in Taylor Township	Hines Rd	—	—	
CSAH 56	—	—	CSAH 29 in Hagali Township	US 71 in Hines Township		—	—	
CSAH 57	—	—	CSAH 20 in Turtle River Township	CSAH 57 in Turtle River Township		—	—	Southern Segment
CSAH 57	—	—	CSAH 21 in Northern Township	US 71 in Port Hope Township		—	—	Northern Segment
CSAH 58	—	—	Reservation Highway 18 in Lower Red Lake Unorganized Territory	CSAH 23 in Battle Township		—	—	
CSAH 59	—	—	CSAH 21 in Northern Township	US 71 in Northern Township		—	—	
CSAH 92	—	—	CSAH 30 in Blackduck	US 71 in Blackduck		—	—	
CSAH 94	—	—	CSAH 36 in Kelliher	MN 72 in Kelliher		—	—	
CR 100	—	—	CSAH 37 in Cormant Township	MN 72 in Cormant Township		—	—	
CR 101	—	—	MN 1 in Quiring Township	Dead End in Quiring Township		—	—	Western Segment
CR 101	—	—	Dead End in Quiring Township	CSAH 23 in Quiring Township		—	—	Eastern Segment
CR 102	—	—	CSAH 23 in Cormant Township	CSAH 34 in Cormant Township		—	—	
CR 103	—	—	MN 1 and MN 72 in Shooks Township	CSAH 36 in Kelliher Township		—	—	
CR 105	—	—	MN 72 in Kelliher Township	Lone Pine Road Northeast in Kelliher Township		—	—	
CR 107	—	—	CSAH 36 in Kelliher Township	Flowing Well Trail in Kelliher Township		—	—	
CR 108	—	—	Boundary Road Northeast in Shotley Township	CSAH 23 in Shotley Township		—	—	
CR 110	—	—	MN 72 in Waskish Township	Ditch 10 Road Northeast in Waskish Township		—	—	
CR 111	—	—	MN 72 in Kelliher Township	MN 72 in Waskish Township		—	—	
CR 112	—	—	Waskish Road Northeast in Waskish Township	Koochiching County line		—	—	
CR 113	—	—	CSAH 38 in Woodrow Township	CSAH 23 in Shotley Township		—	—	
CR 200	—	—	CSAH 15 in Durand Township	Dead End in Durand Township		—	—	
CR 201	—	—	CSAH 13 in Durand Township	CSAH 32 in Nebish Township		—	—	
CR 202	—	—	CR 201 in Nebish Township	CSAH 15 in Nebish Township		—	—	
CR 203	—	—	CSAH 23 in Hagali Township	CSAH 32 in Hagali Township		—	—	
CR 300	—	—	CSAH 31 in Hines Township	CSAH 39 in Hines Township		—	—	
CR 301	—	—	CSAH 15 in Turtle Lake Township	CSAH 26 in Turtle Lake Township		—	—	
CR 302	—	—	CSAH 47 in Hornet Township	US 71 in Hornet Township		—	—	
CR 303	—	—	CSAH 17 in Northern Township	CSAH 21 in Northern Township		—	—	
CR 304	—	—	MN 72 in Hornet Township	US 71 in Hornet Township		—	—	
CR 305	—	—	CSAH 21 in Northern Township	CSAH 22 in Turtle Lake Township		—	—	
CR 306	—	—	CSAH 37 in Langor Township	MN 72 in Langor Township		—	—	
CR 307	—	—	CSAH 22 in Taylor Township	Main Street East in Tenstrike		—	—	
CR 309	—	—	CSAH 31 in Hines Township	CSAH 32 in Hines Township		—	—	
CR 310	—	—	US 71 in Northern Township	CSAH 15 in Northern Township		—	—	
CR 311	—	—	CR 328 in Summit Township	CSAH 30 in Summit Township		—	—	
CR 328	—	—	CSAH 39 in Summit Township	Itasca County line		—	—	
CR 401	—	—	CSAH 2 in Bemidji Township	CSAH 11 in Bemidji Township		—	—	
CR 402	—	—	Fellowship Court Southwest in Bemidji Township	Jackson Avenue Southwest in Bemidji Township		—	—	Western Segment
CR 402	—	—	US 71 in Bemidji Township	CSAH 2 in Bemidji Township		—	—	Eastern Segment
CR 403	—	—	CSAH 4 in Frohn Township	CSAH 8 in Frohn Township		—	—	
CR 404	—	—	CSAH 50 in Bemidji Township	CSAH 25 in Frohn Township		—	—	
CR 406	—	—	CSAH 12 in Bemidji Township	CR 407 in Frohn Township		—	—	
CR 407	—	—	CSAH 4 in Frohn Township	CSAH 12 in Frohn Township		—	—	
CR 413	—	—	CSAH 12 in Frohn Township	CSAH 27 in Turtle River Township		—	—	
CR 500	—	—	Dead End in Roosevelt Township	CSAH 23 in Shotley Township		—	—	
CR 501	—	—	Clearline Road Northwest in Jones Township	US 2 in Lammers Township		—	—	
CR 503	—	—	CSAH 5 in Jones Township	US 2 in Lammers Township		—	—	
CR 505	—	—	US 2 in Lammers Township	CSAH 5 in Lammers Township		—	—	
CR 507	—	—	CSAH 5 in Lammers Township	US 2 in Lammers Township		—	—	
CR 509	—	—	CSAH 22 in Buzzle Township	CR 511 in Buzzle Township		—	—	
CR 511	—	—	CR 509 and CR 600 in Buzzle Township	CSAH 24 in Buzzle Township		—	—	
CR 513	—	—	CSAH 24 in Roosevelt Township	CSAH 32 in Alaska Township		—	—	
CR 515	—	—	US 2 in Wilton	MN 89 in Eckles Township		—	—	
CR 600	—	—	CR 511 in Liberty Township	CSAH 9 in Liberty Township		—	—	
CR 601	—	—	CSAH 5 in Alaska Township	Jallen Road Northwest in Alaska Township		—	—	
CR 602	—	—	CSAH 24 in Maple Ridge Township	MN 89 in Maple Ridge Township		—	—	
CR 603	—	—	CSAH 26 in Maple Ridge Township	MN 89 in Maple Ridge Township		—	—	
CR 700	—	—	MN 89 in Benville Township	CR 707 in Hamre Township		—	—	
CR 701	—	—	CSAH 44 in Benville Township	Hagen Road Northwest in North Beltrami Unorganized Territory		—	—	
CR 702	—	—	Marshall County line	CSAH 44 in Spruce Grove Township		—	—	
CR 703	—	—	MN 89 in Benville Township	CSAH 44 in Benville Township		—	—	
CR 704	—	—	CSAH 44 in Minnie Township	Mertz Road Northwest in Minnie Township		—	—	
CR 705	—	—	CR 700 in Hamre Township	CR 702 in Spruce Grove Township		—	—	
CR 706	—	—	CSAH 1 in North Beltrami Unorganized Territory	Moose River Road Northwest in North Beltrami Unorganized Territory		—	—	
CR 707	—	—	CR 710 in Hamre Township	MN 89 in Hamre Township		—	—	
CR 709	—	—	CR 710 in Steenerson Township	MN 89 in Steenerson Township		—	—	
CR 710	—	—	Marshall County line	MN 89 in Steenerson Township		—	—	
