= Clover Township, Minnesota =

Clover Township is the name of some places in the U.S. state of Minnesota:

- Clover Township, Clearwater County, Minnesota
- Clover Township, Hubbard County, Minnesota
- Clover Township, Mahnomen County, Minnesota
- Clover Township, Pine County, Minnesota

== See also ==
- Clover Township (disambiguation)
