= Cormant Township, Beltrami County, Minnesota =

Township in Minnesota, United States

Cormant Township, Minnesota
- Township
- Location of Cormant Township, within Beltrami County, Minnesota
- Coordinates: 47°52′14″N 94°35′57″W
- Country: United States
- State: Minnesota
- County: Beltrami

Area
  - Total: 36.4 sq mi (94.4 km^{2})
  - Land: 36.4 sq mi (94.4 km^{2})
  - Water: 0 sq mi (0.0 km^{2})
- Elevation: 1,263 ft (385 m)

Population (2020)
  - Total: 202
  - Density: 5.54/sq mi (2.14/km^{2})
- Time zone: UTC-6 (Central (CST))
  - Summer (DST): UTC-5 (CDT)
- ZIP code: 56630
- Area code: 218
- FIPS code: 27-13258
- GNIS feature ID: 0663872

Cormant Township is a township in Beltrami County, Minnesota, United States. The population was 202 as of the 2020 census. Cormant Township was named after the double-crested cormorant.

== Geography ==
According to the United States Census Bureau, the township has a total area of 36.4 square miles (94 km^{2}), all land.

=== Unincorporated towns ===
- Inez at 47.860234°N 94.580245°W

(This list is based on USGS data and may include former settlements.)

=== Major highways ===
- Minnesota State Highway 1
- Minnesota State Highway 72

=== Adjacent townships ===
- Woodrow Township (north)
- Kelliher Township (northeast)
- Shooks Township (east)
- Hornet Township (southeast)
- Langor Township (south)
- O'Brien Township (southwest)
- Quiring Township (west)
- Battle Township (northwest)

=== Cemeteries ===
The township contains these three cemeteries: Capernaum, Cormant Township, and Pine Ridge.

== Demographics ==
Historical population
Census	Pop.	Note	%±
1900	21		—
1910	249		1,085.7%
1920	239		−4.0%
1930	206		−13.8%
1940	320		55.3%
1950	295		−7.8%
1960	219		−25.8%
1970	239		9.1%
1980	220		−7.9%
1990	199		−9.5%
2000	207		4.0%
2010	158		−23.7%
2020	202		27.8%
U.S. Decennial Census

As of the census of 2000, there were 207 people, 72 households, and 55 families residing in the township. The population density was 5.7 inhabitants per square mile (2.2/km^{2}). There were 101 housing units at an average density of 2.8 per square mile (1.1/km^{2}). The racial makeup of the township was 99.03% White and 0.97% Native American.

There were 72 households, out of which 37.5% had children under the age of 18 living with them, 66.7% were married couples living together, 4.2% had a female householder with no husband present, and 23.6% were non-families. 22.2% of all households were made up of individuals, and 9.7% had someone living alone who was 65 years of age or older. The average household size was 2.88 and the average family size was 3.33.

In the township the population was spread out, with 34.3% under the age of 18, 6.3% from 18 to 24, 20.8% from 25 to 44, 25.6% from 45 to 64, and 13.0% who were 65 years of age or older. The median age was 37 years. For every 100 females, there were 107.0 males. For every 100 females age 18 and over, there were 100.0 males.

The median income for a household in the township was $25,625, and the median income for a family was $29,500. Males had a median income of $17,321 versus $27,917 for females. The per capita income for the township was $10,537. About 24.2% of families and 29.0% of the population were below the poverty line, including 36.4% of those under the age of eighteen and 20.0% of those 65 or over.
