= Langor Township, Beltrami County, Minnesota =

Langor Township, Minnesota
- Township
- Location of Langor Township, within Beltrami County, Minnesota
- Coordinates: 47°47′12″N 94°35′3″W
- Country: United States
- State: Minnesota
- County: Beltrami

Area
  - Total: 36.2 sq mi (93.7 km^{2})
  - Land: 36.1 sq mi (93.6 km^{2})
  - Water: 0.039 sq mi (0.1 km^{2})
- Elevation: 1,293 ft (394 m)

Population (2020)
  - Total: 208
  - Density: 5.76/sq mi (2.22/km^{2})
- Time zone: UTC-6 (Central (CST))
  - Summer (DST): UTC-5 (CDT)
- ZIP code: 56630
- Area code: 218
- FIPS code: 27-35540
- GNIS feature ID: 0664725

Langor Township is a township in Beltrami County, Minnesota, United States. The population was 208 as of the 2020 census.

Langor Township was named for Henry A. Langord, an early settler and native of Norway.

== Geography ==
According to the United States Census Bureau, the township has a total area of 36.2 square miles (94 km^{2}), of which 36.2 square miles (94 km^{2}) is land and 0.04 square miles (0.10 km^{2}) (0.11%) is water.

=== Unincorporated towns ===
- Langor at 47.780788°N 94.591636°W

(This list is based on USGS data and may include former settlements.)

=== Major highway ===
- Minnesota State Highway 72

=== Lakes ===
- Smith Lake (north edge)

=== Adjacent townships ===
- Cormant Township (north)
- Shooks Township (northeast)
- Hornet Township (east)
- Summit Township (southeast)
- Hines Township (south)
- Hagali Township (southwest)
- O'Brien Township (west)
- Quiring Township (northwest)

=== Cemeteries ===
The township contains Langor Cemetery.

== Demographics ==
Historical population
Census	Pop.	Note	%±
1900	150		—
1910	154		2.7%
1920	159		3.2%
1930	169		6.3%
1940	268		58.6%
1950	214		−20.1%
1960	258		20.6%
1970	143		−44.6%
1980	182		27.3%
1990	186		2.2%
2000	186		0.0%
2010	213		14.5%
2020	208		−2.3%
U.S. Decennial Census

As of the census of 2000, there were 186 people, 68 households, and 51 families residing in the township. The population density was 5.1 inhabitants per square mile (2.0/km^{2}). There were 85 housing units at an average density of 2.4 per square mile (0.93/km^{2}). The racial makeup of the township was 98.92% White, 0.54% Native American, and 0.54% from two or more races.

There were 68 households, out of which 42.6% had children under the age of 18 living with them, 63.2% were married couples living together, 1.5% had a female householder with no husband present, and 25.0% were non-families. 25.0% of all households were made up of individuals, and 11.8% had someone living alone who was 65 years of age or older. The average household size was 2.74 and the average family size was 3.20.

In the township the population was spread out, with 31.2% under the age of 18, 7.5% from 18 to 24, 26.3% from 25 to 44, 24.2% from 45 to 64, and 10.8% who were 65 years of age or older. The median age was 36 years. For every 100 females, there were 129.6 males. For every 100 females age 18 and over, there were 128.6 males.

The median income for a household in the township was $41,000, and the median income for a family was $48,125. Males had a median income of $24,583 versus $17,143 for females. The per capita income for the township was $17,662. None of the families and 3.8% of the population were living below the poverty line.
