= O'Brien Township, Beltrami County, Minnesota =

O'Brien Township, Minnesota
- Township
- Location of O'Brien Township, within Beltrami County, Minnesota
- Coordinates: 47°48′27″N 94°42′36″W
- Country: United States
- State: Minnesota
- County: Beltrami

Area
  - Total: 35.9 sq mi (93.1 km^{2})
  - Land: 35.9 sq mi (93.1 km^{2})
  - Water: 0.039 sq mi (0.1 km^{2})
- Elevation: 1,273 ft (388 m)

Population (2020)
  - Total: 47
  - Density: 1.3/sq mi (0.50/km^{2})
- Time zone: UTC-6 (Central (CST))
  - Summer (DST): UTC-5 (CDT)
- ZIP code: 56667
- Area code: 218
- FIPS code: 27-48040
- GNIS feature ID: 0665196

O'Brien Township is a township in Beltrami County, Minnesota, United States. The population was 47 as of the 2020 census.

O'Brien Township was named for William O'Brien, a lumberman.

== Geography ==
According to the United States Census Bureau, the township has a total area of 36.0 square miles (93.1 km^{2}), of which 35.9 square miles (93.1 km^{2}) is land and 0.04 square miles (0.1 km^{2}) (0.08%) is water.

=== Major highway ===
- Minnesota State Highway 89

=== Lakes ===
- Alaska Lake (east half)
- Balm Lake
- Barr Lake
- Crookston Lake
- Dellwater Lake
- Fahul Lake (west quarter)
- Fessland Lake
- Frisby Lake (east edge)
- Haggerty Lake (east edge)
- Island Lake
- Mina Lake
- Moose Lake
- Parks Lake
- Pickerel Lake
- Rice Lake
- Rice Lake (west three-quarters)
- Sylvia Lake (east three-quarters)
- Ten Mile Lake

=== Adjacent townships ===
- Alaska Township (north)
- Nebish Township (east)
- Maple Ridge Township (southeast)
- Roosevelt Township (southwest)
- Clover Township, Clearwater County (west)
- Sinclair Township, Clearwater County (west)

== Demographics ==
Historical population
Census	Pop.	Note	%±
1900	23		—
1910	47		104.3%
1920	66		40.4%
1930	76		15.2%
1940	90		18.4%
1950	78		−13.3%
1960	148		89.7%
1970	73		−50.7%
1980	85		16.4%
1990	80		−5.9%
2000	56		−30.0%
2010	58		3.6%
2020	47		−19.0%
U.S. Decennial Census

As of the census of 2000, there were 56 people, 23 households, and 16 families residing in the township. The population density was 1.6 people per square mile (0.6/km^{2}). There were 25 housing units at an average density of 0.7/sq mi (0.3/km^{2}). The racial makeup of the township was 96.43% White, and 3.57% from two or more races.

There were 23 households, out of which 21.7% had children under the age of 18 living with them, 69.6% were married couples living together, and 26.1% were non-families. 26.1% of all households were made up of individuals, and 8.7% had someone living alone who was 65 years of age or older. The average household size was 2.43 and the average family size was 2.82.

In the township the population was spread out, with 21.4% under the age of 18, 5.4% from 18 to 24, 23.2% from 25 to 44, 30.4% from 45 to 64, and 19.6% who were 65 years of age or older. The median age was 47 years. For every 100 females, there were 86.7 males. For every 100 females age 18 and over, there were 100.0 males.

The median income for a household in the township was $12,083, and the median income for a family was $37,500. Males had a median income of $16,250 versus $14,583 for females. The per capita income for the township was $12,509. There were 37.5% of families and 35.7% of the population living below the poverty line, including 40.9% of under eighteens and 18.2% of those over 64.
