= Liberty Township, Beltrami County, Minnesota =

Liberty Township, Minnesota
- Township
- Location of Liberty Township, within Beltrami County, Minnesota
- Coordinates: 47°38′44″N 94°59′35″W
- Country: United States
- State: Minnesota
- County: Beltrami

Area
  - Total: 36.3 sq mi (94.1 km^{2})
  - Land: 32.9 sq mi (85.3 km^{2})
  - Water: 3.4 sq mi (8.8 km^{2})
- Elevation: 1,430 ft (436 m)

Population (2020)
  - Total: 746
  - Density: 22.7/sq mi (8.75/km^{2})
- Time zone: UTC-6 (Central (CST))
  - Summer (DST): UTC-5 (CDT)
- ZIP code: 56667
- Area code: 218
- FIPS code: 27-36926
- GNIS feature ID: 0664775
- Website: https://libertytwpbeltrami.gov/

Liberty Township is a township in Beltrami County, Minnesota, United States. The population was 746 as of the 2020 census.

== Geography ==
According to the United States Census Bureau, the township has a total area of 36.3 square miles (94.1 km^{2}), of which 33.0 square miles (85.3 km^{2}) is land and 3.4 square miles (8.8 km^{2}) (9.36%) is water.

=== Major highway ===
- Minnesota State Highway 89

=== Lakes ===
- Campbell Lake (vast majority)
- Deer Lake
- Ess Lake (vast majority)
- Lake Erick
- Long Lake
- Mud Lake
- Muskrat Lake (south quarter)
- Peterson Lake
- Pony Lake
- Ragged Lake
- Round Lake
- Wolf Lake

=== Adjacent townships ===
- Maple Ridge Township (north)
- Durand Township (northeast)
- Turtle Lake Township (east)
- Northern Township (southeast)
- Eckles Township (south)
- Lammers Township (southwest)
- Buzzle Township (west)

=== Cemeteries ===
The township contains Trinity Cemetery.

== Demographics ==
Historical population
Census	Pop.	Note	%±
1900	165		—
1910	235		42.4%
1920	325		38.3%
1930	283		−12.9%
1940	360		27.2%
1950	318		−11.7%
1960	250		−21.4%
1970	263		5.2%
1980	342		30.0%
1990	473		38.3%
2000	623		31.7%
2010	730		17.2%
2020	746		2.2%
U.S. Decennial Census

As of the census of 2000, there were 623 people, 232 households, and 181 families residing in the township. The population density was 18.9 inhabitants per square mile (7.3/km^{2}). There were 279 housing units at an average density of 8.5 per square mile (3.3/km^{2}). The racial makeup of the township was 96.31% White, 2.09% Native American, 0.48% Asian, 0.16% Pacific Islander, and 0.96% from two or more races. Hispanic or Latino of any race were 0.48% of the population.

There were 232 households, out of which 40.1% had children under the age of 18 living with them, 63.8% were married couples living together, 8.2% had a female householder with no husband present, and 21.6% were non-families. 17.2% of all households were made up of individuals, and 6.0% had someone living alone who was 65 years of age or older. The average household size was 2.69 and the average family size was 3.04.

In the township the population was spread out, with 28.7% under the age of 18, 9.3% from 18 to 24, 32.6% from 25 to 44, 20.2% from 45 to 64, and 9.1% who were 65 years of age or older. The median age was 35 years. For every 100 females, there were 107.0 males. For every 100 females age 18 and over, there were 104.6 males.

The median income for a household in the township was $45,391, and the median income for a family was $44,722. Males had a median income of $31,250 versus $22,750 for females. The per capita income for the township was $18,482. About 3.2% of families and 4.4% of the population were below the poverty line, including 5.1% of those under age 18 and 3.9% of those age 65 or over.
