= Hagali Township, Beltrami County, Minnesota =

Hagali Township, Minnesota
- Township
- Location of Hagali Township, within Beltrami County, Minnesota
- Coordinates: 47°42′3″N 94°45′9″W
- Country: United States
- State: Minnesota
- County: Beltrami

Area
  - Total: 36.4 sq mi (94.2 km^{2})
  - Land: 33.2 sq mi (86.1 km^{2})
  - Water: 3.1 sq mi (8.1 km^{2})
- Elevation: 1,339 ft (408 m)

Population (2020)
  - Total: 360
  - Density: 11/sq mi (4.2/km^{2})
- Time zone: UTC-6 (Central (CST))
  - Summer (DST): UTC-5 (CDT)
- ZIP code: 56647
- Area code: 218
- FIPS code: 27-26468
- GNIS feature ID: 0664368

Hagali Township is a township in Beltrami County, Minnesota, United States. The population was 360 as of the 2020 census. Hagali Township was named for an early Norwegian settler.

== Geography ==
According to the United States Census Bureau, the township has a total area of 36.4 square miles (94 km^{2}), of which 33.3 square miles (86 km^{2}) is land and 3.1 square miles (8.0 km^{2}) (8.58%) is water.

=== Lakes ===
- Bass Lake (east half)
- Cranberry Lake
- Gull Lake (north quarter)
- Hagali Lake (vast majority)
- Jackson Lake (east quarter)
- Loon Lake
- Medicine Lake
- Rice Lake
- Sandy Lake
- White Fish Lake (east half)

=== Adjacent townships ===
- O'Brien Township (north)
- Langor Township (northeast)
- Hines Township (east)
- Port Hope Township (south)
- Turtle Lake Township (southwest)
- Durand Township (west)
- Nebish Township (west)

== Demographics ==
Historical population
Census	Pop.	Note	%±
1900	72		—
1910	105		45.8%
1920	204		94.3%
1930	208		2.0%
1940	329		58.2%
1950	244		−25.8%
1960	177		−27.5%
1970	152		−14.1%
1980	256		68.4%
1990	255		−0.4%
2000	319		25.1%
2010	372		16.6%
2020	360		−3.2%
U.S. Decennial Census

As of the census of 2000, there were 319 people, 121 households, and 101 families residing in the township. The population density was 9.6 inhabitants per square mile (3.7/km^{2}). There were 187 housing units at an average density of 5.6 per square mile (2.2/km^{2}). The racial makeup of the township was 96.87% White, 1.88% Native American, and 1.25% from two or more races. Hispanic or Latino of any race were 1.88% of the population.

There were 121 households, out of which 33.9% had children under the age of 18 living with them, 75.2% were married couples living together, 5.8% had a female householder with no husband present, and 16.5% were non-families. 16.5% of all households were made up of individuals, and 9.1% had someone living alone who was 65 years of age or older. The average household size was 2.60 and the average family size was 2.90.

In the township the population was spread out, with 25.1% under the age of 18, 5.0% from 18 to 24, 27.6% from 25 to 44, 28.5% from 45 to 64, and 13.8% who were 65 years of age or older. The median age was 41 years. For every 100 females, there were 105.8 males. For every 100 females age 18 and over, there were 109.6 males.

The median income for a household in the township was $38,000, and the median income for a family was $41,250. Males had a median income of $36,500 versus $18,750 for females. The per capita income for the township was $13,672. About 11.1% of families and 11.6% of the population were below the poverty line, including 11.2% of those under age 18 and 22.2% of those age 65 or over.

== Notable person ==
- Robert A. Falk, farmer and legislator, was born in the township.
