= Solway, Minnesota =

City in Minnesota, United States

Solway
- City
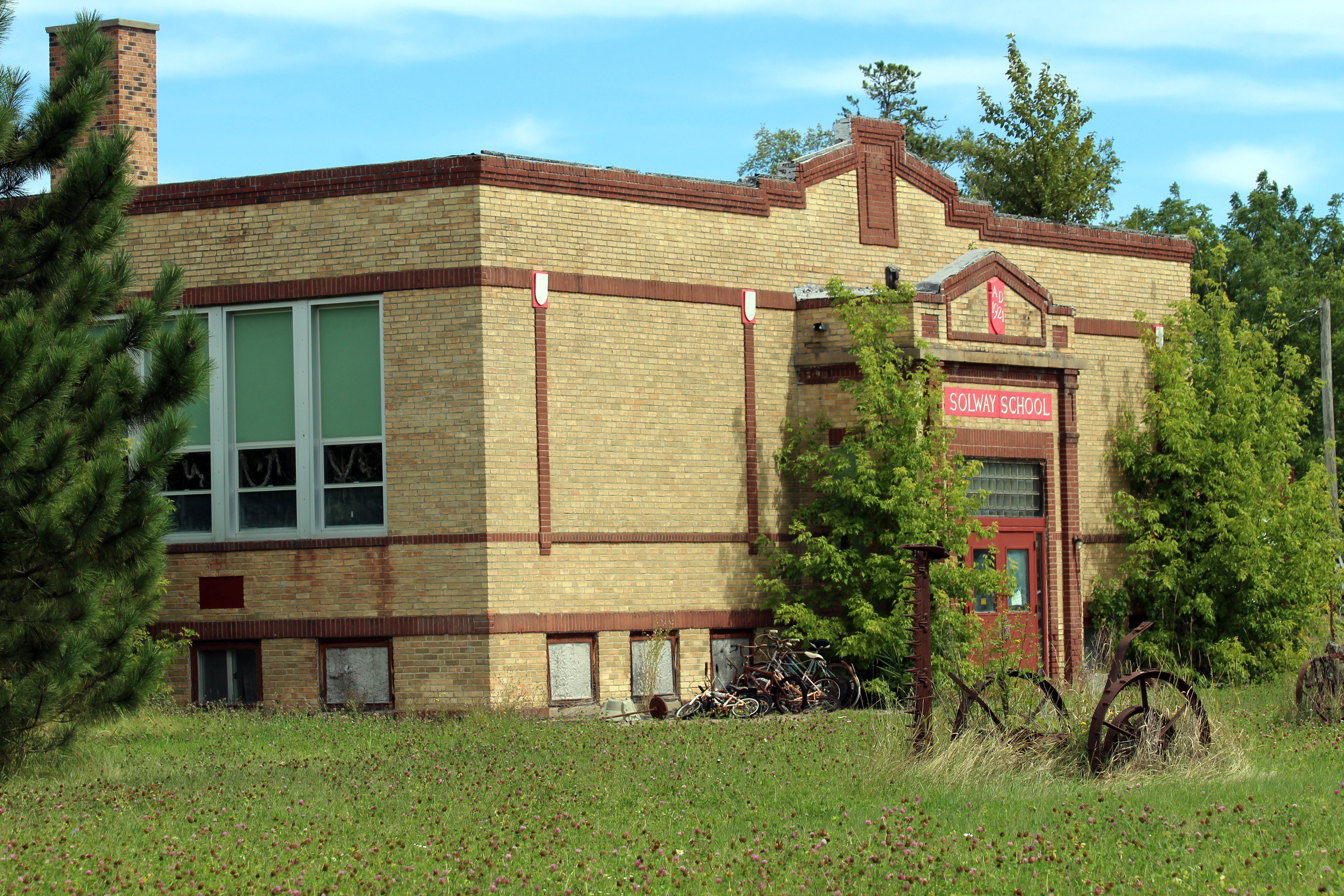
- Solway School building

- Location of Solway within Beltrami County and state of Minnesota
- Coordinates: 47°31′11″N 95°7′50″W
- Country: United States
- State: Minnesota
- County: Beltrami

Area
  - Total: 1.03 sq mi (2.67 km^{2})
  - Land: 1.03 sq mi (2.67 km^{2})
  - Water: 0 sq mi (0.00 km^{2})
- Elevation: 1,450 ft (442 m)

Population (2020)
  - Total: 73
  - Density: 70.9/sq mi (27.38/km^{2})
- Time zone: UTC-6 (Central (CST))
  - Summer (DST): UTC-5 (CDT)
- FIPS code: 27-61114
- GNIS feature ID: 0652248

Solway is a city in Beltrami County, Minnesota, United States. As of the 2020 census, Solway had a population of 73. Solway serves as a bedroom community for nearby Bemidji.

== History ==
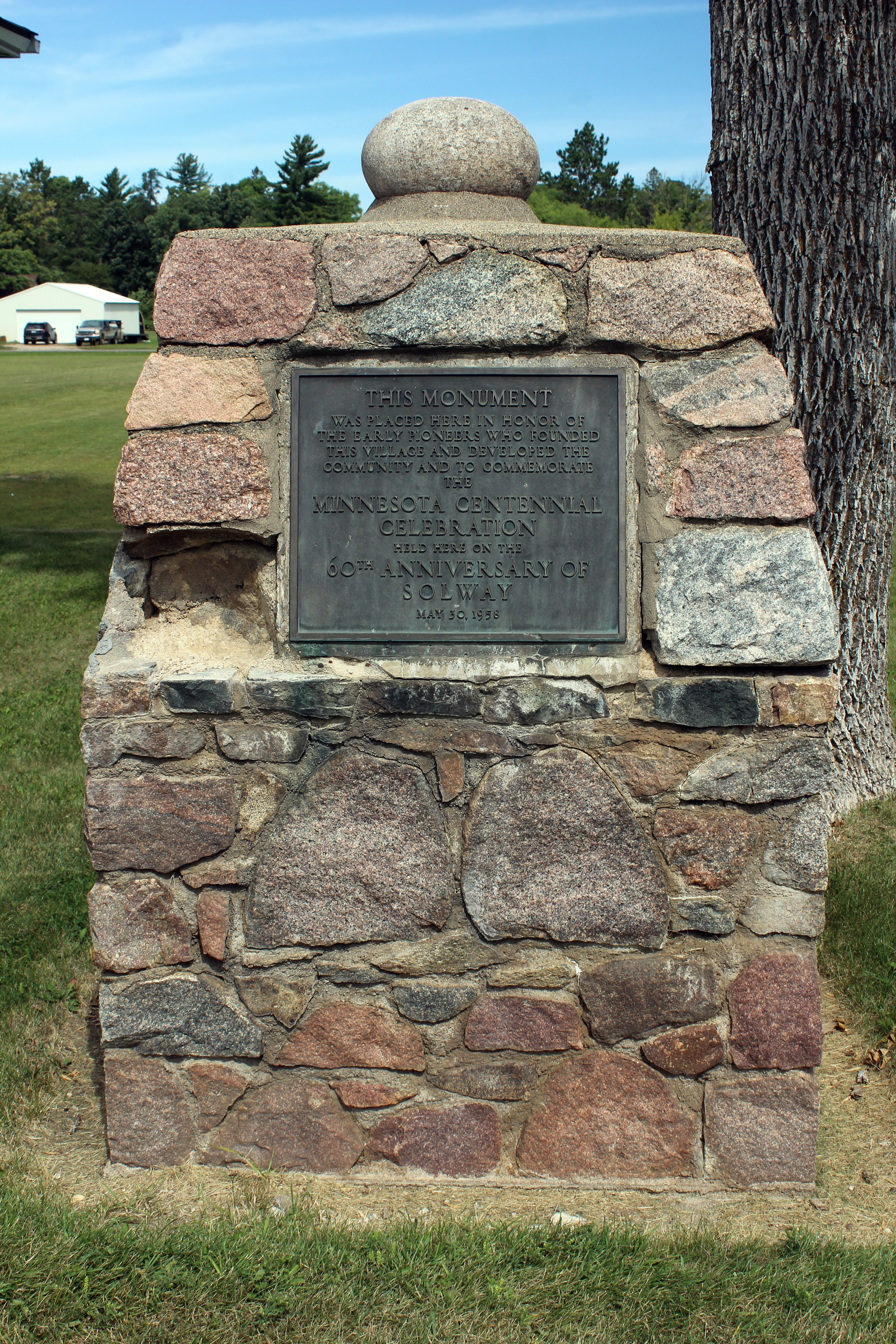
Historic marker

Solway was settled in 1899 during a period of logging and railroad development in northern Minnesota. Its name may refer to the Solway Firth between England and Scotland, although the origin is not certain. The community grew near major timber operations and served as a center for logging camps between Red Lake, Itasca, Bagley, and other sites. At its peak, Solway had a hospital, jail, bank, saloons, hotels, a blacksmith shop, livery stable, mercantile store, newspaper, train depot, fire department, and post office. A post office called Solway has been in operation since 1898. Buildings connected to this period include the former Solway Mercantile Store, built about 1899 and later occupied by JD's Outpost; Solway Lutheran Church, built in 1921; the Old Solway School, built in 1937 after two earlier school buildings burned; and the Solway Town Hall.

Logging drove Solway's growth from the late 1880s to about 1905. Lumber operators including Sumner Bagley, Albert and George Lammers, and T. B. Walker worked in the surrounding pine forests, while Fletcher Walker later managed operations in Solway. The Lammers logging camp processed 60 million logs during one summer, sending timber down the Clearwater River to sawmills and markets across the country. Estimates state that more than 4 billion board feet of lumber were cut in the Solway area. Swedish immigrants began settling in nearby Lammers Township in 1898, followed by families from Norway and Denmark. These settlers farmed, worked in logging camps, and supported the region's economy. As accessible timber declined and logging activity shifted, Solway's population and business district decreased.

== Geography ==
According to the United States Census Bureau, the city has a total area of 1.03 square miles (2.67 km^{2}), all land.

Solway is located within Lammers Township geographically but is a separate entity. It is 13 miles west of Bemidji, along U.S. Highway 2 and Beltrami County Road 5.

== Demographics ==
Historical population
Census	Pop.	Note	%±
1900	177		—
1910	85		−52.0%
1920	106		24.7%
1930	104		−1.9%
1940	136		30.8%
1950	124		−8.8%
1960	100		−19.4%
1970	96		−4.0%
1980	89		−7.3%
1990	74		−16.9%
2000	69		−6.8%
2010	96		39.1%
2020	73		−24.0%
U.S. Decennial Census

=== 2010 census ===
As of the census of 2010, there were 96 people, 32 households, and 26 families living in the city. The population density was 93.2 inhabitants per square mile (36.0/km^{2}). There were 33 housing units at an average density of 32.0 per square mile (12.4/km^{2}). The racial makeup of the city was 96.9% White and 3.1% from two or more races.

There were 32 households, of which 46.9% had children under the age of 18 living with them, 62.5% were married couples living together, 3.1% had a female householder with no husband present, 15.6% had a male householder with no wife present, and 18.8% were non-families. 15.6% of all households were made up of individuals, and 6.2% had someone living alone who was 65 years of age or older. The average household size was 3.00 and the average family size was 3.19.

The median age in the city was 35 years. 33.3% of residents were under the age of 18; 6.2% were between the ages of 18 and 24; 21.9% were from 25 to 44; 25.1% were from 45 to 64; and 13.5% were 65 years of age or older. The gender makeup of the city was 49.0% male and 51.0% female.

=== 2000 census ===
As of the census of 2000, there were 69 people, 27 households, and 17 families living in the city. The population density was 67.1 inhabitants per square mile (25.9/km^{2}). There were 32 housing units at an average density of 31.1 per square mile (12.0/km^{2}). The racial makeup of the city was 98.55% White and 1.45% Native American.

There were 27 households, of which 33.3% had children under the age of 18 living with them, 48.1% were married couples living together, 11.1% had a female householder with no husband present, and 37.0% were non-families. 29.6% of all households were made up of individuals, and 18.5% had someone living alone who was 65 years of age or older. The average household size was 2.56 and the average family size was 3.24.

In the city, the population was spread out, with 31.9% under the age of 18, 5.8% from 18 to 24, 20.3% from 25 to 44, 29.0% from 45 to 64, and 13.0% who were 65 years of age or older. The median age was 32 years. For every 100 females, there were 122.6 males. For every 100 females age 18 and over, there were 123.8 males.

The median income for a household in the city was $25,625, and the median income for a family was $34,375. Males had a median income of $35,625 versus $11,875 for females. The per capita income for the city was $19,912. There were 15.8% of families and 29.4% of the population living below the poverty line, including 55.0% of under eighteens and none of those over 64.

== Gallery ==
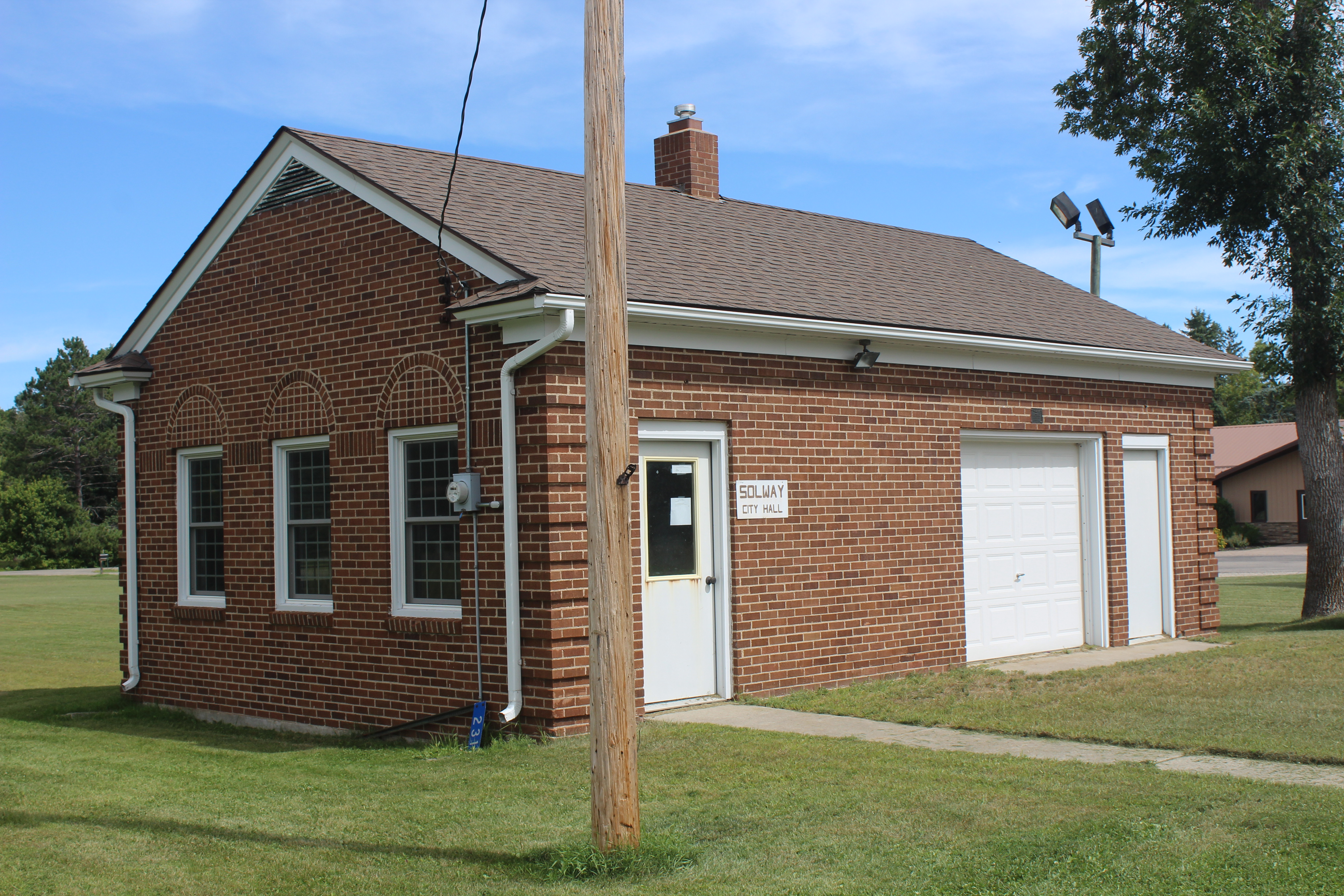
Solway City Hall

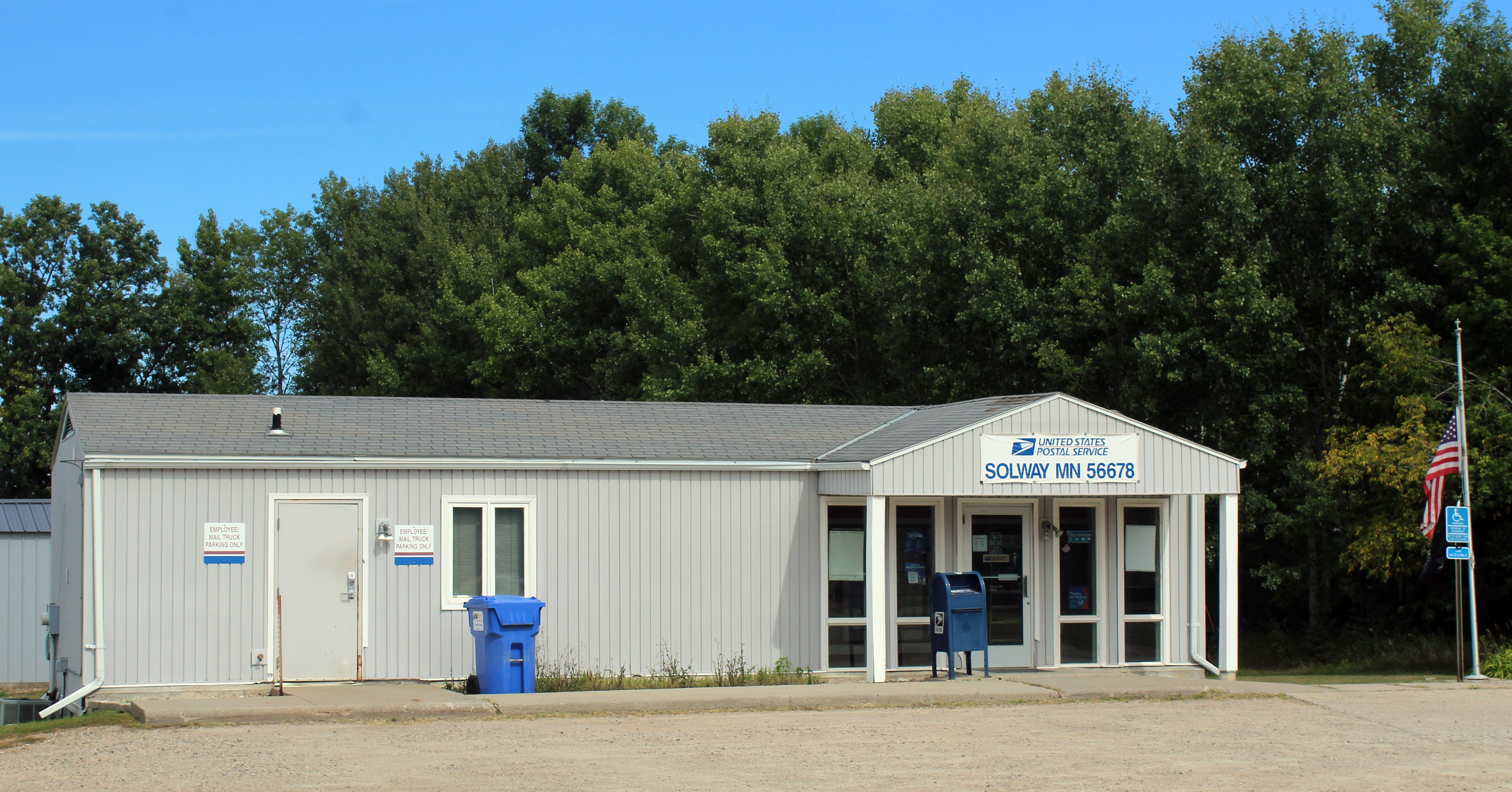
Post Office

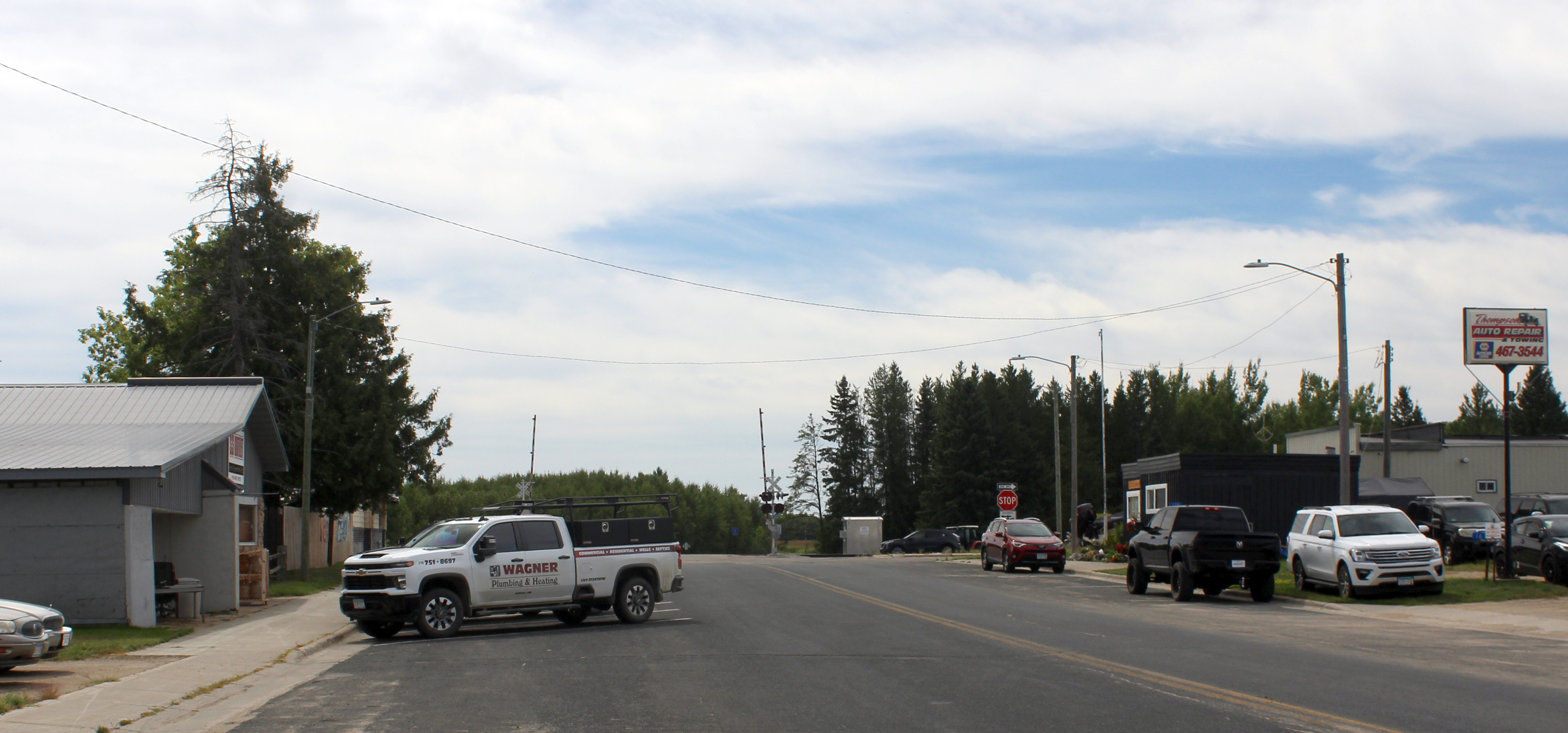
Businesses on Centerline Road
