= Summit Township, Beltrami County, Minnesota =

Summit Township, Minnesota
- Township
- Location of Summit Township, within Beltrami County, Minnesota
- Coordinates: 47°42′38″N 94°29′0″W
- Country: United States
- State: Minnesota
- County: Beltrami

Area
  - Total: 35.2 sq mi (91.1 km^{2})
  - Land: 35.0 sq mi (90.6 km^{2})
  - Water: 0.19 sq mi (0.5 km^{2})
- Elevation: 1,417 ft (432 m)

Population (2020)
  - Total: 263
  - Density: 7.52/sq mi (2.90/km^{2})
- Time zone: UTC-6 (Central (CST))
  - Summer (DST): UTC-5 (CDT)
- ZIP code: 56630
- Area code: 218
- FIPS code: 27-63328
- GNIS feature ID: 0665735

Summit Township is a township in Beltrami County, Minnesota, United States. The population was 263 as of the 2020 census.

Summit Township was named due to its lofty elevation.

== Geography ==
According to the United States Census Bureau, the township has a total area of 35.2 square miles (91.1 km^{2}), of which 35.0 square miles (90.6 km^{2}) is land and 0.2 square miles (0.5 km^{2}) (0.54%) is water.

The east half of the city of Blackduck is within this township geographically but is a separate entity.

=== Major highways ===
- U.S. Route 71
- Minnesota State Highway 72

=== Lakes ===
- Christianson Lake
- Fields Lake
- Gilstad Lake (northeast quarter)

=== Adjacent townships ===
- Hornet Township (north)
- Nore Township, Itasca County (northeast)
- Moose Park Township, Itasca County (east)
- Birch Township (south)
- Taylor Township (southwest)
- Hines Township (west)
- Langor Township (northwest)

=== Cemeteries ===
The township contains Summit Township Cemetery.

== Demographics ==
Historical population
Census	Pop.	Note	%±
1900	68		—
1910	109		60.3%
1920	233		113.8%
1930	231		−0.9%
1940	277		19.9%
1950	245		−11.6%
1960	215		−12.2%
1970	180		−16.3%
1980	205		13.9%
1990	237		15.6%
2000	259		9.3%
2010	251		−3.1%
2020	263		4.8%
U.S. Decennial Census

As of the census of 2000, there were 259 people, 98 households, and 77 families residing in the township. The population density was 7.4 people per square mile (2.9/km^{2}). There were 108 housing units at an average density of 3.1/sq mi (1.2/km^{2}). The racial makeup of the township was 98.46% White, 0.39% Native American, 0.39% Asian, 0.39% from other races, and 0.39% from two or more races. Hispanic or Latino of any race were 0.39% of the population.

There were 98 households, out of which 29.6% had children under the age of 18 living with them, 76.5% were married couples living together, 1.0% had a female householder with no husband present, and 21.4% were non-families. 19.4% of all households were made up of individuals, and 9.2% had someone living alone who was 65 years of age or older. The average household size was 2.51 and the average family size was 2.90.

In the township the population was spread out, with 22.8% under the age of 18, 8.5% from 18 to 24, 26.3% from 25 to 44, 27.4% from 45 to 64, and 15.1% who were 65 years of age or older. The median age was 41 years. For every 100 females, there were 96.2 males. For every 100 females age 18 and over, there were 96.1 males.

The median income for a household in the township was $36,250, and the median income for a family was $46,250. Males had a median income of $32,292 versus $24,063 for females. The per capita income for the township was $18,208. None of the families and 5.3% of the population were living below the poverty line, including no under eighteens and 30.3% of those over 64.
