= Steenerson Township, Beltrami County, Minnesota =

Steenerson Township, Minnesota
- Township
- Location of Steenerson Township, within Beltrami County, Minnesota
- Coordinates: 48°14′27″N 95°16′50″W
- Country: United States
- State: Minnesota
- County: Beltrami

Area
  - Total: 36.3 sq mi (94.0 km^{2})
  - Land: 36.3 sq mi (94.0 km^{2})
  - Water: 0 sq mi (0.0 km^{2})
- Elevation: 1,227 ft (374 m)

Population (2020)
  - Total: 24
  - Density: 0.66/sq mi (0.26/km^{2})
- Time zone: UTC-6 (Central (CST))
  - Summer (DST): UTC-5 (CDT)
- FIPS code: 27-62680
- GNIS feature ID: 0665705

Steenerson Township is a township in Beltrami County, Minnesota, United States. The population was 24 as of the 2020 census.

Steenerson Township was named for Halvor Steenerson, a member of the U.S. House of Representatives from Minnesota's 9th district.

== Geography ==
According to the United States Census Bureau, the township has a total area of 36.3 square miles (94.0 km^{2}), all land.

=== Unincorporated town ===
- Thorhult at 48.230242°N 95.248045°W

(This list is based on USGS data and may include former settlements.)

=== Major highway ===
- Minnesota State Highway 89

=== Adjacent townships ===
- Minnie Township (north)
- Hamre Township (west)
- Spruce Grove Township (northwest)

=== Cemeteries ===
The township contains Rosebud Cemetery.

=== Climate ===
There is a weather station for Thorhult, a community in the Steenerson Township. Thorhult has a dry-winter humid continental climate (Köppen Dwb).

Climate data for Thorhult, Minnesota, 1991–2020 normals, 1956-2020 extremes: 1237ft (377m)
Month	Jan	Feb	Mar	Apr	May	Jun	Jul	Aug	Sep	Oct	Nov	Dec	Year
Record high °F (°C)	50 (10)	58 (14)	76 (24)	96 (36)	94 (34)	98 (37)	101 (38)	98 (37)	94 (34)	92 (33)	73 (23)	57 (14)	101 (38)
Mean maximum °F (°C)	39.2 (4.0)	42.6 (5.9)	56.9 (13.8)	73.0 (22.8)	83.9 (28.8)	86.7 (30.4)	88.2 (31.2)	88.5 (31.4)	84.4 (29.1)	75.1 (23.9)	55.3 (12.9)	39.5 (4.2)	91.1 (32.8)
Mean daily maximum °F (°C)	16.5 (−8.6)	22.8 (−5.1)	36.9 (2.7)	52.5 (11.4)	65.9 (18.8)	74.8 (23.8)	79.4 (26.3)	77.9 (25.5)	69.0 (20.6)	52.7 (11.5)	35.4 (1.9)	22.3 (−5.4)	50.5 (10.3)
Daily mean °F (°C)	6.2 (−14.3)	11.5 (−11.4)	25.8 (−3.4)	40.5 (4.7)	53.0 (11.7)	62.8 (17.1)	67.4 (19.7)	65.6 (18.7)	57.2 (14.0)	42.9 (6.1)	27.1 (−2.7)	13.4 (−10.3)	39.5 (4.2)
Mean daily minimum °F (°C)	−4.0 (−20.0)	0.2 (−17.7)	14.7 (−9.6)	28.4 (−2.0)	40.2 (4.6)	50.9 (10.5)	55.4 (13.0)	53.3 (11.8)	45.3 (7.4)	33.1 (0.6)	18.8 (−7.3)	4.4 (−15.3)	28.4 (−2.0)
Mean minimum °F (°C)	−33.1 (−36.2)	−27.9 (−33.3)	−15.4 (−26.3)	10.8 (−11.8)	24.6 (−4.1)	35.4 (1.9)	42.1 (5.6)	38.8 (3.8)	28.2 (−2.1)	16.8 (−8.4)	−4.2 (−20.1)	−23.7 (−30.9)	−36.1 (−37.8)
Record low °F (°C)	−49 (−45)	−51 (−46)	−41 (−41)	−21 (−29)	10 (−12)	20 (−7)	33 (1)	20 (−7)	10 (−12)	0 (−18)	−31 (−35)	−43 (−42)	−51 (−46)
Average precipitation inches (mm)	0.47 (12)	0.22 (5.6)	0.72 (18)	1.42 (36)	2.98 (76)	4.25 (108)	3.78 (96)	3.48 (88)	2.78 (71)	2.09 (53)	0.83 (21)	0.39 (9.9)	23.41 (594.5)
Average snowfall inches (cm)	8.9 (23)	7.0 (18)	6.9 (18)	4.4 (11)	0.0 (0.0)	trace	0.0 (0.0)	0.0 (0.0)	trace	1.6 (4.1)	6.9 (18)	11.0 (28)	46.7 (120.1)
Source 1: NOAA
Source 2: XMACIS2 (temp records, monthly max/mins & precip/snowfall)

== Demographics ==
Historical population
Census	Pop.	Note	%±
1910	69		—
1920	103		49.3%
1930	89		−13.6%
1940	112		25.8%
1950	88		−21.4%
1960	72		−18.2%
1970	50		−30.6%
1980	52		4.0%
1990	44		−15.4%
2000	28		−36.4%
2010	23		−17.9%
2020	24		4.3%
U.S. Decennial Census

As of the census of 2000, there were 28 people, 11 households, and 8 families residing in the township. The population density was 0.8 people per square mile (0.3/km^{2}). There were 28 housing units at an average density of 0.8/sq mi (0.3/km^{2}). The racial makeup of the township was 89.29% White, 3.57% African American and 7.14% Native American.

There were 11 households, out of which 18.2% had children under the age of 18 living with them, 63.6% were married couples living together, 9.1% had a female householder with no husband present, and 18.2% were non-families. 18.2% of all households were made up of individuals, and 9.1% had someone living alone who was 65 years of age or older. The average household size was 2.55 and the average family size was 2.67.

In the township the population was spread out, with 17.9% under the age of 18, 7.1% from 18 to 24, 14.3% from 25 to 44, 39.3% from 45 to 64, and 21.4% who were 65 years of age or older. The median age was 55 years. For every 100 females, there were 100.0 males. For every 100 females age 18 and over, there were 155.6 males.

The median income for a household in the township was $13,750, and the median income for a family was $12,500. Males had a median income of $38,750 versus $6,250 for females. The per capita income for the township was $10,075. None of the population and none of the families were below the poverty line.
