= Eckles Township, Beltrami County, Minnesota =

Eckles Township, Minnesota
- Township
- Location of Eckles Township, within Beltrami County, Minnesota
- Coordinates: 47°31′37″N 94°59′48″W
- Country: United States
- State: Minnesota
- County: Beltrami

Area
  - Total: 32.1 sq mi (83.2 km^{2})
  - Land: 31.6 sq mi (81.9 km^{2})
  - Water: 0.50 sq mi (1.3 km^{2})
- Elevation: 1,401 ft (427 m)

Population (2020)
  - Total: 2,014
  - Density: 63.7/sq mi (24.6/km^{2})
- Time zone: UTC-6 (Central (CST))
  - Summer (DST): UTC-5 (CDT)
- ZIP code: 56687
- Area code: 218
- FIPS code: 27-17954
- GNIS feature ID: 0664038
- Website: ecklestownship.gov

Eckles Township is a township in Beltrami County, Minnesota, United States. The population was 2,014 as of the 2020 census.

== History ==
Eckles Township was named for an early landowner and railroad promoter.

== Geography ==
According to the United States Census Bureau, the township has a total area of 32.1 square miles (83.2 km^{2}), of which 31.6 square miles (81.9 km^{2}) is land and 0.50 square miles (1.3 km^{2}), or 1.54%, is water.

The city of Wilton and the west edge of the city of Bemidji are within this township geographically but are separate entities.

=== Unincorporated towns ===
- Scribner at 47.534396°N 95.012505°W

(This list is based on USGS data and may include former settlements.)

=== Major highways ===
- U.S. Route 2
- Minnesota State Highway 89
- Minnesota State Highway 197

=== Lakes ===
- Grant Lake
- Grass Lake (northwest half)
- Harley Lake
- Meadow Lake

=== Adjacent townships ===
- Liberty Township (north)
- Turtle Lake Township (northeast)
- Northern Township (east)
- Grant Valley Township (south)
- Jones Township (southwest)
- Lammers Township (west)
- Buzzle Township (northwest)

=== Cemeteries ===
The township contains Eckles Cemetery.

== Demographics ==
Historical population
| Census | Pop. | Note | %± |
|---|---|---|---|
| 1900 | 245 | | — |
| 1910 | 278 | | 13.5% |
| 1920 | 275 | | −1.1% |
| 1930 | 284 | | 3.3% |
| 1940 | 303 | | 6.7% |
| 1950 | 274 | | −9.6% |
| 1960 | 227 | | −17.2% |
| 1970 | 352 | | 55.1% |
| 1980 | 607 | | 72.4% |
| 1990 | 805 | | 32.6% |
| 2000 | 1,033 | | 28.3% |
| 2010 | 1,516 | | 46.8% |
| 2020 | 2,014 | | 32.8% |
U.S. Decennial Census

As of the census of 2000, there were 1,033 people, 368 households, and 274 families residing in the township. The population density was 32.6 inhabitants per square mile (12.6/km^{2}). There were 379 housing units at an average density of 12.0 per square mile (4.6/km^{2}). The racial makeup of the township was 84.61% White, 0.10% African American, 10.94% Native American, 0.10% Asian, 0.10% from other races, and 4.16% from two or more races. Hispanic or Latino of any race were 1.74% of the population.

There were 368 households, out of which 41.8% had children under the age of 18 living with them, 54.9% were married couples living together, 15.5% had a female householder with no husband present, and 25.5% were non-families. 18.2% of all households were made up of individuals, and 5.4% had someone living alone who was 65 years of age or older. The average household size was 2.81 and the average family size was 3.15.

In the township the population was spread out, with 33.0% under the age of 18, 11.7% from 18 to 24, 27.4% from 25 to 44, 19.7% from 45 to 64, and 8.2% who were 65 years of age or older. The median age was 29 years. For every 100 females, there were 100.6 males. For every 100 females age 18 and over, there were 89.6 males.

The median income for a household in the township was $29,000, and the median income for a family was $36,094. Males had a median income of $28,182 versus $22,404 for females. The per capita income for the township was $13,462. About 14.0% of families and 17.1% of the population were below the poverty line, including 20.9% of those under age 18 and 11.5% of those age 65 or over.
