= Hamre Township, Beltrami County, Minnesota =

Hamre Township, Minnesota
- Township
- Location of Hamre Township, within Beltrami County, Minnesota
- Coordinates: 48°14′28″N 95°23′23″W
- Country: United States
- State: Minnesota
- County: Beltrami

Area
  - Total: 35.9 sq mi (93.1 km^{2})
  - Land: 35.9 sq mi (93.0 km^{2})
  - Water: 0 sq mi (0.0 km^{2})
- Elevation: 1,204 ft (367 m)

Population (2020)
  - Total: 19
  - Density: 0.53/sq mi (0.20/km^{2})
- Time zone: UTC-6 (Central (CST))
  - Summer (DST): UTC-5 (CDT)
- FIPS code: 27-26900
- GNIS feature ID: 0664387

Hamre Township is a township in Beltrami County, Minnesota, United States. The population was 19 as of the 2020 census. A large share of the early settlers being natives of Hamre Municipality in Norway, caused the name to be selected.

== Geography ==
According to the United States Census Bureau, the township has a total area of 35.9 square miles (93 km^{2}), of which 35.9 square miles (93 km^{2}) is land and 0.04 square miles (0.10 km^{2}) (0.06%) is water.

=== Unincorporated towns ===
- Carmel at 48.281630°N 95.444437°W
- Jelle at 48.238018°N 95.400271°W

(This list is based on USGS data and may include former settlements.)

=== Major highway ===
- Minnesota State Highway 89

=== Adjacent townships ===
- Spruce Grove Township (north)
- Minnie Township (northeast)
- Steenerson Township (east)
- Lee Township (west)
- Benville Township (northwest)

=== Cemeteries ===
The township contains Our Saviours Cemetery.

== Demographics ==
Historical population
Census	Pop.	Note	%±
1910	116		—
1920	191		64.7%
1930	131		−31.4%
1940	148		13.0%
1950	114		−23.0%
1960	72		−36.8%
1970	36		−50.0%
1980	31		−13.9%
1990	27		−12.9%
2000	15		−44.4%
2010	13		−13.3%
2020	19		46.2%
U.S. Decennial Census

As of the census of 2000, there were 15 people, 9 households, and 3 families residing in the township. The population density was 0.4 inhabitants per square mile (0.15/km^{2}). There were 20 housing units at an average density of 0.6 per square mile (0.23/km^{2}). The racial makeup of the township was 100.00% White.

There were 9 households, out of which 22.2% had children under the age of 18 living with them, 33.3% were married couples living together, and 55.6% were non-families. 55.6% of all households were made up of individuals, and 22.2% had someone living alone who was 65 years of age or older. The average household size was 1.67 and the average family size was 2.50.

In the township the population was spread out, with 20.0% under the age of 18, 40.0% from 25 to 44, 13.3% from 45 to 64, and 26.7% who were 65 years of age or older. The median age was 44 years. For every 100 females, there were 200.0 males. For every 100 females age 18 and over, there were 140.0 males.

The median income for a household in the township was $16,875, and the median income for a family was $18,750. Males had a median income of $33,750 versus $16,250 for females. The per capita income for the township was $8,476. There were no families and 11.8% of the population living below the poverty line, including no under eighteens and 50.0% of those over 64.
