= Alaska Township, Beltrami County, Minnesota =

Township in Minnesota, United States

Alaska Township, Minnesota
- Township
- Location of Alaska Township, within Beltrami County, Minnesota
- Coordinates: 47°47′14″N 95°5′27″W
- Country: United States
- State: Minnesota
- County: Beltrami

Area
  - Total: 35.4 sq mi (91.7 km^{2})
  - Land: 32.2 sq mi (83.5 km^{2})
  - Water: 3.2 sq mi (8.2 km^{2})
- Elevation: 1,316 ft (401 m)

Population (2020)
  - Total: 195
  - Density: 6.05/sq mi (2.34/km^{2})
- Time zone: UTC-6 (Central (CST))
  - Summer (DST): UTC-5 (CDT)
- ZIP code: 56667
- Area code: 218
- FIPS code: 27-00586
- GNIS feature ID: 0663395

Alaska Township is a township in Beltrami County, Minnesota, United States. The population was 195 as of the 2020 census. Alaska Township was named by settlers who had recently returned from a trip to Alaska.

== Geography ==
According to the United States Census Bureau, the township has a total area of 35.4 square miles (92 km^{2}), of which 32.2 square miles (83 km^{2}) is land and 3.2 square miles (8.3 km^{2}) (8.90%) is water.

=== Unincorporated towns ===
- Island Lake at 47.788845°N 95.018051°W

(This list is based on USGS data and may include former settlements.)

=== Major highway ===
- Minnesota State Highway 89

=== Lakes ===
- Alaska Lake (east half)
- Balm Lake
- Barr Lake
- Crookston Lake
- Dellwater Lake
- Fahul Lake (west quarter)
- Fessland Lake
- Frisby Lake (east edge)
- Haggerty Lake (east edge)
- Island Lake
- Mina Lake
- Moose Lake
- Parks Lake
- Pickerel Lake
- Rice Lake
- Rice Lake (west three-quarters)
- Sylvia Lake (east three-quarters)
- Ten Mile Lake

=== Adjacent townships ===
- Nebish Township (east)
- Maple Ridge Township (southeast)
- Roosevelt Township (southwest)
- Clover Township, Clearwater County (west)
- Sinclair Township, Clearwater County (west)

=== Cemeteries ===
The township contains Island Lake Cemetery.

== Demographics ==
Historical population
Census	Pop.	Note	%±
1900	29		—
1910	85		193.1%
1920	184		116.5%
1930	190		3.3%
1940	267		40.5%
1950	218		−18.4%
1960	188		−13.8%
1970	159		−15.4%
1980	171		7.5%
1990	256		49.7%
2000	197		−23.0%
2010	217		10.2%
2020	195		−10.1%
U.S. Decennial Census

As of the census of 2000, there were 197 people, 81 households, and 54 families residing in the township. The population density was 6.1 people per square mile (2.4/km^{2}). There were 135 housing units at an average density of 4.2/sq mi (1.6/km^{2}). The racial makeup of the township was 90.86% White, 2.03% Native American, and 7.11% from two or more races.

There were 81 households, out of which 22.2% had children under the age of 18 living with them, 55.6% were married couples living together, 8.6% had a female householder with no husband present, and 33.3% were non-families. 29.6% of all households were made up of individuals, and 14.8% had someone living alone who was 65 years of age or older. The average household size was 2.43 and the average family size was 2.96.

In the township the age distribution of the population shows 22.3% under the age of 18, 8.6% from 18 to 24, 19.3% from 25 to 44, 31.5% from 45 to 64, and 18.3% who were 65 years of age or older. The median age was 44 years. For every 100 females, there were 103.1 males. For every 100 females age 18 and over, there were 109.6 males.

The median income for a household in the township was $40,313, and the median income for a family was $53,750. Males had a median income of $31,875 versus $19,063 for females. The per capita income for the township was $16,990. About 3.5% of families and 13.8% of the population were below the poverty line, including 13.0% of those under the age of eighteen and 20.6% of those 65 or over.
