= Hines Township, Beltrami County, Minnesota =

Hines Township, Minnesota
- Township
- Location of Hines Township, within Beltrami County, Minnesota
- Coordinates: 47°42′19″N 94°36′48″W
- Country: United States
- State: Minnesota
- County: Beltrami

Area
  - Total: 35.2 sq mi (91.1 km^{2})
  - Land: 30.5 sq mi (79.0 km^{2})
  - Water: 4.7 sq mi (12.1 km^{2})
- Elevation: 1,398 ft (426 m)

Population (2020)
  - Total: 612
  - Density: 20.1/sq mi (7.75/km^{2})
- Time zone: UTC-6 (Central (CST))
  - Summer (DST): UTC-5 (CDT)
- ZIP code: 56647
- Area code: 218
- FIPS code: 27-29348
- GNIS feature ID: 0664485

Hines Township is a township in Beltrami County, Minnesota, United States. The population was 612 as of the 2020 census.

== Geography ==
According to the United States Census Bureau, the township has a total area of 35.2 square miles (91 km^{2}), of which 30.5 square miles (79 km^{2}) is land and 4.7 square miles (12 km^{2}) (13.27%) is water.

The west half of the city of Blackduck is within this township geographically but is a separate entity.

=== History ===
Hines Township Was Organized In : 1919

=== Unincorporated towns ===
- Hines at 47.686065°N 94.632752°W

(This list is based on USGS data and may include former settlements.)

=== Major highways ===
- U.S. Route 71
- Minnesota State Highway 72

=== Lakes ===
- Blackduck Lake
- Crandall Lake
- Dutchman Lake (north half)
- Erickson Lake (northeast quarter)
- Flenner Lake
- Funk Lake
- Hanson Lake (north edge)
- Smith Lake (vast majority)

=== Adjacent townships ===
- Langor Township (north)
- Hornet Township (northeast)
- Summit Township (east)
- Taylor Township (south)
- Hagali Township (west)
- O'Brien Township (northwest)

=== Cemeteries ===
The township contains Lakeview Cemetery.

== Demographics ==
Historical population
Census	Pop.	Note	%±
1930	448		—
1940	599		33.7%
1950	568		−5.2%
1960	434		−23.6%
1970	406		−6.5%
1980	575		41.6%
1990	556		−3.3%
2000	674		21.2%
2010	689		2.2%
2020	612		−11.2%
U.S. Decennial Census

As of the census of 2000, there were 674 people, 244 households, and 192 families residing in the township. The population density was 22.1 inhabitants per square mile (8.5/km^{2}). There were 312 housing units at an average density of 10.2 per square mile (3.9/km^{2}). The racial makeup of the township was 96.88% White, 2.08% Native American, 0.15% Asian, and 0.89% from two or more races. Hispanic or Latino of any race were 1.19% of the population.

There were 244 households, out of which 32.4% had children under the age of 18 living with them, 68.9% were married couples living together, 4.9% had a female householder with no husband present, and 21.3% were non-families. 17.6% of all households were made up of individuals, and 6.1% had someone living alone who was 65 years of age or older. The average household size was 2.76 and the average family size was 3.14.

In the township the population was spread out, with 27.2% under the age of 18, 7.0% from 18 to 24, 24.5% from 25 to 44, 28.2% from 45 to 64, and 13.2% who were 65 years of age or older. The median age was 39 years. For every 100 females, there were 110.0 males. For every 100 females age 18 and over, there were 108.1 males.

The median income for a household in the township was $42,292, and the median income for a family was $46,250. Males had a median income of $33,750 versus $23,571 for females. The per capita income for the township was $17,342. About 6.5% of families and 9.3% of the population were below the poverty line, including 12.0% of those under age 18 and 22.0% of those age 65 or over.
