= Northern Township, Beltrami County, Minnesota =

Northern Township, Minnesota
- Township
- Location of Northern Township, within Beltrami County, Minnesota
- Coordinates: 47°31′40″N 94°52′26″W
- Country: United States
- State: Minnesota
- County: Beltrami

Area
  - Total: 34.1 sq mi (88.2 km^{2})
  - Land: 26.7 sq mi (69.2 km^{2})
  - Water: 7.3 sq mi (19.0 km^{2})
- Elevation: 1,355 ft (413 m)

Population (2020)
  - Total: 4,535
  - Density: 170/sq mi (65.5/km^{2})
- Time zone: UTC-6 (Central (CST))
  - Summer (DST): UTC-5 (CDT)
- ZIP code: 56601
- Area code: 218
- FIPS code: 27-46906
- GNIS feature ID: 0665153
- Website: northerntownship.com

Northern Township is a township in Beltrami County, Minnesota, United States. The population was 4,535 as of the 2020 United States Census.

Northern Township was named from its location on the north shore of Lake Bemidji.

Northern Township was granted incorporation in February 2026 to form the new city of Northern, avoiding annexation into neighboring Bemidji. The township will host its first election for mayor and council on November 3, 2026.

== Geography ==
According to the United States Census Bureau, the township has a total area of 34.1 square miles (88.2 km^{2}), of which 26.7 square miles (69.2 km^{2}) is land and 7.3 square miles (19.0 km^{2}), or 21.55%, is water.

The north quarter of the city of Bemidji borders the township.

=== Unincorporated towns ===
- Birchmont at 47.546341°N 94.860550°W
- Lavinia at 47.514952°N 94.811659°W
- Movil Lake Trailer Park at 47.5775°N 94.877777°W
- Northern Trailer Park at 47.563055°N 94.885555°W
- Secluded Acres at 47.531944°N 94.886111°W
- Woodland Park at 47.552777°N 94.841666°W

(This list is based on USGS data and may include former settlements.)

=== Major highways ===
- U.S. Route 2
- U.S. Route 71
- Minnesota State Highway 197

=== Lakes ===
- Alice Lake
- Little Gnat Lake (west edge)
- Lake Bemidji (north three-quarters)
- Movil Lake (south quarter)

=== Adjacent townships ===
- Turtle Lake Township (north)
- Port Hope Township (northeast)
- Turtle River Township (east)
- Bemidji Township (south)
- Grant Valley Township (southwest)
- Eckles Township (west)
- Liberty Township (northwest)

=== Cemeteries ===
The township contains Northern Cemetery.

== Demographics ==
Historical population
Census	Pop.	Note	%±
1900	114		—
1910	205		79.8%
1920	324		58.0%
1930	287		−11.4%
1940	745		159.6%
1950	863		15.8%
1960	1,049		21.6%
1970	2,086		98.9%
1980	3,211		53.9%
1990	3,718		15.8%
2000	4,021		8.1%
2010	4,657		15.8%
2020	4,535		−2.6%
U.S. Decennial Census

As of the census of 2000, there were 4,021 people, 1,469 households, and 1,123 families residing in the township. The population density was 146.1 inhabitants per square mile (56.4/km^{2}). There were 1,691 housing units at an average density of 61.4 per square mile (23.7/km^{2}). The racial makeup of the township was 91.89% White, 0.22% African American, 5.37% Native American, 0.72% Asian, 0.02% Pacific Islander, 0.22% from other races, and 1.54% from two or more races. Hispanic or Latino of any race were 0.80% of the population.

There were 1,469 households, out of which 39.0% had children under the age of 18 living with them, 63.7% were married couples living together, 9.3% had a female householder with no husband present, and 23.5% were non-families. 17.4% of all households were made up of individuals, and 5.9% had someone living alone who was 65 years of age or older. The average household size was 2.67 and the average family size was 3.02.

In the township the population was spread out, with 30.1% under the age of 18, 8.6% from 18 to 24, 27.1% from 25 to 44, 24.3% from 45 to 64, and 9.9% who were 65 years of age or older. The median age was 35 years. For every 100 females, there were 102.5 males. For every 100 females age 18 and over, there were 97.7 males.

The median income for a household in the township was $44,535, and the median income for a family was $48,800. Males had a median income of $35,375 versus $21,884 for females. The per capita income for the township was $18,843. About 5.3% of families and 7.1% of the population were below the poverty line, including 6.6% of those under age 18 and 2.0% of those age 65 or over.
