= Kelliher Township, Beltrami County, Minnesota =

Kelliher Township
- Township
- Location of Kelliher Township, within Beltrami County, Minnesota
- Coordinates: 47°56′11″N 94°29′37″W
- Country: United States
- State: Minnesota
- County: Beltrami

Area
  - Total: 33.6 sq mi (87.0 km^{2})
  - Land: 33.6 sq mi (86.9 km^{2})
  - Water: 0.039 sq mi (0.1 km^{2})
- Elevation: 1,306 ft (398 m)

Population (2020)
  - Total: 126
  - Density: 3.76/sq mi (1.45/km^{2})
- Time zone: UTC-6 (Central (CST))
  - Summer (DST): UTC-5 (CDT)
- ZIP code: 56650
- Area code: 218
- FIPS code: 27-32624
- GNIS feature ID: 0664608

Kelliher Township is a township in Beltrami County, Minnesota, United States. The population was 126 as of the 2020 census.

== Geography ==
According to the United States Census Bureau, the township has a total area of 33.6 square miles (87 km^{2}), of which 33.5 square miles (87 km^{2}) is land and 0.04 square miles (0.10 km^{2}) (0.12%) is water.

The city of Kelliher is entirely within this township geographically but is a separate entity.

=== Major highway ===
- Minnesota State Highway 72

=== Lakes ===
- Pothole Lake
- Bullhead Lake

=== Adjacent townships ===
- Shooks Township (south)
- Cormant Township (southwest)
- Woodrow Township (west)

== Demographics ==
Historical population
Census	Pop.	Note	%±
1910	13		—
1920	211		1,523.1%
1930	136		−35.5%
1940	156		14.7%
1950	150		−3.8%
1960	126		−16.0%
1970	122		−3.2%
1980	160		31.1%
1990	100		−37.5%
2000	150		50.0%
2010	130		−13.3%
2020	126		−3.1%
U.S. Decennial Census

As of the census of 2000, there were 150 people, 52 households, and 38 families residing in the township. The population density was 4.5 people per square mile (1.7/km^{2}). There were 58 housing units at an average density of 1.7/sq mi (0.7/km^{2}). The racial makeup of the township was 97.33% White, 2.00% Native American, and 0.67% from two or more races.

There were 52 households, out of which 32.7% had children under the age of 18 living with them, 59.6% were married couples living together, 3.8% had a female householder with no husband present, and 26.9% were non-families. 23.1% of all households were made up of individuals, and 7.7% had someone living alone who was 65 years of age or older. The average household size was 2.88 and the average family size was 3.32.

In the township the population was spread out, with 28.7% under the age of 18, 8.0% from 18 to 24, 21.3% from 25 to 44, 28.7% from 45 to 64, and 13.3% who were 65 years of age or older. The median age was 39 years. For every 100 females, there were 105.5 males. For every 100 females age 18 and over, there were 109.8 males.

The median income for a household in the township was $21,250, and the median income for a family was $23,750. Males had a median income of $30,000 versus $16,750 for females. The per capita income for the township was $12,613. There were 30.0% of families and 32.5% of the population living below the poverty line, including 59.0% of under eighteens and 33.3% of those over 64.
