= Clover Township =

Clover Township may refer to:

- Clover Township, Henry County, Illinois
- Clover Township, Pine County, Minnesota
- Clover Township, Mahnomen County, Minnesota
- Clover Township, Hubbard County, Minnesota
- Clover Township, Clearwater County, Minnesota
- Clover Township, Jefferson County, Pennsylvania
