= Benville Township, Beltrami County, Minnesota =

Township in Minnesota, United States

Benville Township, Minnesota
- Township
- Location of Benville Township, within Beltrami County, Minnesota
- Coordinates: 48°18′38″N 95°33′13″W
- Country: United States
- State: Minnesota
- County: Beltrami

Area
  - Total: 34.5 sq mi (89.4 km^{2})
  - Land: 34.5 sq mi (89.4 km^{2})
  - Water: 0 sq mi (0.0 km^{2})
- Elevation: 1,198 ft (365 m)

Population (2020)
  - Total: 98
  - Density: 2.8/sq mi (1.1/km^{2})
- Time zone: UTC-6 (Central (CST))
  - Summer (DST): UTC-5 (CDT)
- FIPS code: 27-05284
- GNIS feature ID: 0663572

Benville Township is a township in Beltrami County, Minnesota, United States. The population was 98 as of the 2020 census.

The township name Benville originated by combining two names of earlier settlers; Bennie (Ben) Gustafson and John Hville(ville).

== Geography ==
According to the United States Census Bureau, the township has a total area of 34.5 square miles (89 km^{2}), all land.

=== Major highway ===
- Minnesota State Highway 89

=== Adjacent townships ===
- Spruce Grove Township (east)
- Hamre Township (southeast)
- Lee Township (south)
- Espelie Township, Marshall County (southwest)
- Valley Township, Marshall County (west)

=== Cemeteries ===
The township contains Valle Cemetery.

== Demographics ==
Historical population
Census	Pop.	Note	%±
1910	276		—
1920	393		42.4%
1930	259		−34.1%
1940	265		2.3%
1950	232		−12.5%
1960	162		−30.2%
1970	112		−30.9%
1980	150		33.9%
1990	98		−34.7%
2000	65		−33.7%
2010	86		32.3%
2020	98		14.0%
U.S. Decennial Census

As of the census of 2000, there were 65 people, 28 households, and 22 families residing in the township. The population density was 1.9 inhabitants per square mile (0.73/km^{2}). There were 49 housing units at an average density of 1.4 per square mile (0.54/km^{2}). The racial makeup of the township was 100.00% White.

There were 28 households, out of which 39.3% had children under the age of 18 living with them, 60.7% were married couples living together, 3.6% had a female householder with no husband present, and 21.4% were non-families. 21.4% of all households were made up of individuals, and 7.1% had someone living alone who was 65 years of age or older. The average household size was 2.32 and the average family size was 2.64.

In the township the population was spread out, with 26.2% under the age of 18, 4.6% from 18 to 24, 29.2% from 25 to 44, 15.4% from 45 to 64, and 24.6% who were 65 years of age or older. The median age was 39 years. For every 100 females, there were 132.1 males. For every 100 females age 18 and over, there were 118.2 males.

The median income for a household in the township was $28,750, and the median income for a family was $36,563. Males had a median income of $35,750 versus $22,917 for females. The per capita income for the township was $15,667. There were no families and 5.1% of the population living below the poverty line, including no under eighteens and none of those over 64.
