= Grant Valley Township, Beltrami County, Minnesota =

Grant Valley Township, Minnesota
- Township
- Motto: "Moving Forward into the 21st Century Through Community Effort"
- Location of Grant Valley Township, within Beltrami County, Minnesota
- Coordinates: 47°27′55″N 94°58′41″W
- Country: United States
- State: Minnesota
- County: Beltrami

Area
  - Total: 35.9 sq mi (93.0 km^{2})
  - Land: 34.0 sq mi (88.1 km^{2})
  - Water: 1.9 sq mi (4.9 km^{2})
- Elevation: 1,371 ft (418 m)

Population (2020)
  - Total: 2,427
  - Density: 71.3/sq mi (27.5/km^{2})
- Time zone: UTC-6 (Central (CST))
  - Summer (DST): UTC-5 (CDT)
- ZIP code: 56601
- Area code: 218
- FIPS code: 27-25352
- GNIS feature ID: 0664328
- Website: grantvalleytownship.info

Grant Valley Township is a township in Beltrami County, Minnesota, United States. The population was 2,427 at the 2020 census, up from 2,029 in 2010. Grant Valley Township was named from its location in the valley of Grant Creek.

== Geography ==
According to the United States Census Bureau, the township has a total area of 35.9 square miles (93.0 km^{2}), of which 34.0 square miles (88.1 km^{2}) is land and 1.9 square miles (4.9 km^{2}), or 5.28%, is water.

The south edge of the city of Wilton is within this township geographically but is a separate entity.

=== Lakes ===
- Bootleg Lake
- Fern Lake
- Grant Lake
- Grass Lake (southwest half)
- Larson Lake
- Little Boot Lake
- Miller Lake
- Miss Lake
- Stainbrook Lake
- Stone Lake
- Twin Lakes

=== Adjacent townships ===
- Eckles Township (north)
- Northern Township (northeast)
- Bemidji Township (east)
- Helga Township, Hubbard County (southeast)
- Rockwood Township, Hubbard County (south)
- Fern Township, Hubbard County (southwest)
- Jones Township (west)
- Lammers Township (northwest)

== Demographics ==
Historical population
| Census | Pop. | Note | %± |
|---|---|---|---|
| 1900 | 232 | | — |
| 1910 | 281 | | 21.1% |
| 1920 | 414 | | 47.3% |
| 1930 | 401 | | −3.1% |
| 1940 | 545 | | 35.9% |
| 1950 | 440 | | −19.3% |
| 1960 | 368 | | −16.4% |
| 1970 | 515 | | 39.9% |
| 1980 | 868 | | 68.5% |
| 1990 | 1,040 | | 19.8% |
| 2000 | 1,450 | | 39.4% |
| 2010 | 2,029 | | 39.9% |
| 2020 | 2,427 | | 19.6% |
U.S. Decennial Census

As of the census of 2000, there were 1,450 people, 526 households, and 405 families residing in the township. The population density was 42.6 inhabitants per square mile (16.4/km^{2}). There were 552 housing units at an average density of 16.2 per square mile (6.3/km^{2}). The racial makeup of the township was 91.72% White, 0.41% African American, 3.93% Native American, 0.69% Asian, 0.34% from other races, and 2.90% from two or more races. Hispanic or Latino of any race were 0.55% of the population.

There were 526 households, out of which 44.1% had children under the age of 18 living with them, 62.7% were married couples living together, 10.1% had a female householder with no husband present, and 23.0% were non-families. 18.6% of all households were made up of individuals, and 3.8% had someone living alone who was 65 years of age or older. The average household size was 2.76 and the average family size was 3.14.

In the township the population was spread out, with 31.0% under the age of 18, 9.0% from 18 to 24, 30.9% from 25 to 44, 21.8% from 45 to 64, and 7.3% who were 65 years of age or older. The median age was 33 years. For every 100 females, there were 103.1 males. For every 100 females age 18 and over, there were 96.7 males.

The median income for a household in the township was $40,595, and the median income for a family was $46,500. Males had a median income of $31,429 versus $21,019 for females. The per capita income for the township was $18,020. About 5.8% of families and 8.8% of the population were below the poverty line, including 9.3% of those under age 18 and 6.8% of those age 65 or over.
