= Port Hope Township, Beltrami County, Minnesota =

Port Hope Township, Minnesota
- Township
- Location of Port Hope Township, within Beltrami County, Minnesota
- Coordinates: 47°36′44″N 94°44′54″W
- Country: United States
- State: Minnesota
- County: Beltrami

Area
  - Total: 32.5 sq mi (84.2 km^{2})
  - Land: 28.4 sq mi (73.6 km^{2})
  - Water: 4.1 sq mi (10.6 km^{2})
- Elevation: 1,355 ft (413 m)

Population (2020)
  - Total: 745
  - Density: 26.2/sq mi (10.1/km^{2})
- Time zone: UTC-6 (Central (CST))
  - Summer (DST): UTC-5 (CDT)
- ZIP code: 56601
- Area code: 218
- FIPS code: 27-52162
- GNIS feature ID: 0665345
- Website: www.porthopetownship.com

Port Hope Township is a township in Beltrami County, Minnesota, United States. The population was 745 as of the 2020 census.

Port Hope Township was likely named after Port Hope, Ontario.

== Geography ==
According to the United States Census Bureau, the township has a total area of 32.5 square miles (84.2 km^{2}), of which 28.4 square miles (73.6 km^{2}) is land and 4.1 square miles (10.5 km^{2}) (12.52%) is water.

The north three-quarters of the city of Turtle River and the west quarter of the city of Tenstrike are within this township geographically but are separate entities.

=== Major highway ===
- U.S. Route 71

=== Lakes ===
- Beltrami Lake (east quarter)
- Gull Lake (south half)
- Little Gnat Lake (northeast quarter)
- Moose Lake (vast majority)
- Peterson Lake
- Pool Lake
- Range Line Lake (east edge)
- School Lake
- Three Island Lake (east half)
- Turtle River Lake (north quarter)

=== Adjacent townships ===
- Hagali Township (north)
- Taylor Township (east)
- Sugar Bush Township (southeast)
- Turtle River Township (south)
- Northern Township (southwest)
- Turtle Lake Township (west)

== Demographics ==
Historical population
Census	Pop.	Note	%±
1900	111		—
1910	162		45.9%
1920	235		45.1%
1930	225		−4.3%
1940	304		35.1%
1950	222		−27.0%
1960	150		−32.4%
1970	234		56.0%
1980	388		65.8%
1990	505		30.2%
2000	590		16.8%
2010	673		14.1%
2020	745		10.7%
U.S. Decennial Census

As of the census of 2000, there were 590 people, 217 households, and 164 families residing in the township. The population density was 20.8 people per square mile (8.0 people/km^{2}). There were 268 housing units at an average density of 9.4 units per square mile (3.6 units/km^{2}). The racial makeup of the township was 93.90% White, 0.17% African American, 2.71% Native American, 0.17% Asian, and 3.05% from two or more races.

There were 217 households, out of which 37.8% had children under the age of 18 living with them, 66.8% were married couples living together, 5.5% had a female householder with no husband present, and 24.0% were non-families. 18.4% of all households were made up of individuals, and 5.1% had someone living alone who was 65 years of age or older. The average household size was 2.67 and the average family size was 3.07.

In the township the population was spread out, with 28.1% under the age of 18, 7.5% from 18 to 24, 29.3% from 25 to 44, 27.1% from 45 to 64, and 8.0% who were 65 years of age or older. The median age was 38 years. For every 100 females, there were 126.9 males. For every 100 females age 18 and over, there were 117.4 males.

The median income for a household in the township was $41,154, and the median income for a family was $44,464. Males had a median income of $35,341 versus $22,750 for females. The per capita income for the township was $18,960. About 6.0% of families and 9.2% of the population were below the poverty line, including 7.4% of those under age 18 and 4.4% of those age 65 or over.
