= Jones Township, Beltrami County, Minnesota =

Jones Township, Minnesota
- Township
- Location of Jones Township, within Beltrami County, Minnesota
- Coordinates: 47°27′59″N 95°7′29″W
- Country: United States
- State: Minnesota
- County: Beltrami

Area
  - Total: 36.0 sq mi (93.3 km^{2})
  - Land: 35.4 sq mi (91.7 km^{2})
  - Water: 0.62 sq mi (1.6 km^{2})
- Elevation: 1,414 ft (431 m)

Population (2020)
  - Total: 271
  - Density: 7.65/sq mi (2.96/km^{2})
- Time zone: UTC-6 (Central (CST))
  - Summer (DST): UTC-5 (CDT)
- ZIP code: 56678
- Area code: 218
- FIPS code: 27-32120
- GNIS feature ID: 0664587

Jones Township is the southwesternmost township in Beltrami County, Minnesota, United States. The population was 271 as of the 2020 census. Jones Township was named for an early settler.

== Geography ==
According to the United States Census Bureau, the township has a total area of 36.0 square miles (93 km^{2}), of which 35.4 square miles (92 km^{2}) is land and 0.6 square miles (1.6 km^{2}) (1.72%) is water.

Jones Township is located in the southwestern corner of Beltrami County. The Mississippi River flows through the township, feeding Lake Manomin, more commonly known as Rice Lake.

=== Lakes ===
- Lake Manomin
- Moose Lake

=== Rivers ===
- Mississippi River
- Little Mississippi River (Piniddiwin)

=== Adjacent townships ===
- Lammers Township (north)
- Eckles Township (northeast)
- Grant Valley Township (east)
- Rockwood Township, Hubbard County (southeast)
- Fern Township, Hubbard County (south)
- Bear Creek Township, Clearwater County (southwest)
- Moose Creek Township, Clearwater County (west)
- Shevlin Township, Clearwater County (northwest)

=== Cemeteries ===
The township contains Jones Township Cemetery.

== Demographics ==
Historical population
Census	Pop.	Note	%±
1900	97		—
1910	116		19.6%
1920	219		88.8%
1930	235		7.3%
1940	308		31.1%
1950	228		−26.0%
1960	138		−39.5%
1970	131		−5.1%
1980	219		67.2%
1990	230		5.0%
2000	277		20.4%
2010	277		0.0%
2020	271		−2.2%
U.S. Decennial Census

As of the census of 2000, there were 277 people, 99 households, and 77 families residing in the township. The population density was 7.8 inhabitants per square mile (3.0/km^{2}). There were 112 housing units at an average density of 3.2 per square mile (1.2/km^{2}). The racial makeup of the township was 95.67% White, 1.44% Native American, and 2.89% from two or more races.

There were 99 households, out of which 39.4% had children under the age of 18 living with them, 66.7% were married couples living together, 7.1% had a female householder with no husband present, and 22.2% were non-families. 20.2% of all households were made up of individuals, and 9.1% had someone living alone who was 65 years of age or older. The average household size was 2.80 and the average family size was 3.14.

In the township the population was spread out, with 31.0% under the age of 18, 7.2% from 18 to 24, 28.9% from 25 to 44, 22.4% from 45 to 64, and 10.5% who were 65 years of age or older. The median age was 35 years. For every 100 females, there were 111.5 males. For every 100 females age 18 and over, there were 112.2 males.

The median income for a household in the township was $38,750, and the median income for a family was $50,000. Males had a median income of $29,000 versus $20,625 for females. The per capita income for the township was $13,612. About 5.9% of families and 7.3% of the population were below the poverty line, including 2.1% of those under the age of eighteen and 24.0% of those 65 or over.
