= Durand Township, Beltrami County, Minnesota =

Township in Minnesota, United States

Durand Township, Minnesota
- Township
- Location of Durand Township, within Beltrami County, Minnesota
- Coordinates: 47°40′53″N 94°53′3″W
- Country: United States
- State: Minnesota
- County: Beltrami

Area
  - Total: 18.3 sq mi (47.5 km^{2})
  - Land: 15.1 sq mi (39.1 km^{2})
  - Water: 3.2 sq mi (8.4 km^{2})
- Elevation: 1,381 ft (421 m)

Population (2020)
  - Total: 227
  - Density: 15.0/sq mi (5.81/km^{2})
- Time zone: UTC-6 (Central (CST))
  - Summer (DST): UTC-5 (CDT)
- ZIP code: 56667
- Area code: 218
- FIPS code: 27-17234
- GNIS feature ID: 0664013

Durand Township is a township in Beltrami County, Minnesota, United States. The population was 227 as of the 2020 census. Durand Township was named for Charles Durand, an early settler.

== Geography ==
According to the United States Census Bureau, the township has a total area of 18.3 square miles (47 km^{2}), of which 15.1 square miles (39 km^{2}) is land and 3.2 square miles (8.3 km^{2}) (17.72%) is water.

=== Unincorporated towns ===
- Puposky at 47.6777324°N 94.9072151°W

(This list is based on USGS data and may include former settlements.)

=== Lakes ===
- Bass Lake (west half)
- Crane Lake (north quarter)
- George Lake (east quarter)
- Jackson Lake (west three-quarters)
- Little Puposky Lake (east edge)
- Lake Julia (northeast half)
- Long Slough Lake (west half)
- Peterson Lake
- Puposky Lake (east three-quarters)
- Strand Lake
- Swamp Lake
- Upper Lindgren Lake

=== Adjacent townships ===
- Nebish Township (north)
- Hagali Township (east)
- Turtle Lake Township (south)
- Liberty Township (southwest)
- Maple Ridge Township (west)

== Demographics ==
Historical population
Census	Pop.	Note	%±
1910	112		—
1920	184		64.3%
1930	288		56.5%
1940	304		5.6%
1950	247		−18.7%
1960	192		−22.3%
1970	162		−15.6%
1980	158		−2.5%
1990	135		−14.6%
2000	175		29.6%
2010	209		19.4%
2020	227		8.6%
U.S. Decennial Census

As of the census of 2000, there were 175 people, 76 households, and 51 families residing in the township. The population density was 11.6 inhabitants per square mile (4.5/km^{2}). There were 82 housing units at an average density of 5.4 per square mile (2.1/km^{2}). The racial makeup of the township was 94.29% White, 5.14% Native American, and 0.57% from two or more races.

There were 76 households, out of which 26.3% had children under the age of 18 living with them, 56.6% were married couples living together, 10.5% had a female householder with no husband present, and 31.6% were non-families. 27.6% of all households were made up of individuals, and 6.6% had someone living alone who was 65 years of age or older. The average household size was 2.30 and the average family size was 2.81.

In the township the population was spread out, with 21.7% under the age of 18, 7.4% from 18 to 24, 22.9% from 25 to 44, 37.1% from 45 to 64, and 10.9% who were 65 years of age or older. The median age was 44 years. For every 100 females, there were 86.2 males. For every 100 females age 18 and over, there were 90.3 males.

The median income for a household in the township was $39,375, and the median income for a family was $43,438. Males had a median income of $32,500 versus $22,813 for females. The per capita income for the township was $22,886. None of the families and 7.3% of the population were living below the poverty line, including no under eighteens and 20.0% of those over 64.
