= Spruce Grove Township, Beltrami County, Minnesota =

Spruce Grove Township, Minnesota
- Township
- Location of Spruce Grove Township, within Beltrami County, Minnesota
- Coordinates: 48°18′51″N 95°24′42″W
- Country: United States
- State: Minnesota
- County: Beltrami

Area
  - Total: 34.6 sq mi (89.6 km^{2})
  - Land: 34.6 sq mi (89.6 km^{2})
  - Water: 0 sq mi (0.0 km^{2})
- Elevation: 1,217 ft (371 m)

Population (2020)
  - Total: 48
  - Density: 1.4/sq mi (0.54/km^{2})
- Time zone: UTC-6 (Central (CST))
  - Summer (DST): UTC-5 (CDT)
- FIPS code: 27-62230
- GNIS feature ID: 0665686

Spruce Grove Township is a township in Beltrami County, Minnesota, United States. The population was 48 at the 2020 census.

Spruce Grove Township was named for groves of spruce contained within this region of the state.

== Geography ==
According to the United States Census Bureau, the township has a total area of 34.6 square miles (89.6 km^{2}), all land.

=== Adjacent townships ===
- Minnie Township (east)
- Steenerson Township (southeast)
- Hamre Township (south)
- Lee Township (southwest)
- Benville Township (west)

=== Cemeteries ===
The township contains Sundberg Cemetery.

== Demographics ==
Historical population
| Census | Pop. | Note | %± |
|---|---|---|---|
| 1910 | 83 | | — |
| 1920 | 199 | | 139.8% |
| 1930 | 113 | | −43.2% |
| 1940 | 144 | | 27.4% |
| 1950 | 132 | | −8.3% |
| 1960 | 85 | | −35.6% |
| 1970 | 82 | | −3.5% |
| 1980 | 64 | | −22.0% |
| 1990 | 81 | | 26.6% |
| 2000 | 63 | | −22.2% |
| 2010 | 55 | | −12.7% |
| 2020 | 48 | | −12.7% |
U.S. Decennial Census

As of the census of 2000, there were 63 people, 22 households, and 17 families residing in the township. The population density was 1.8 people per square mile (0.7/km^{2}). There were 39 housing units at an average density of 1.1/sq mi (0.4/km^{2}). The racial makeup of the township was 100.00% White.

There were 22 households, out of which 27.3% had children under the age of 18 living with them, 72.7% were married couples living together, and 22.7% were non-families. 22.7% of all households were made up of individuals, and 9.1% had someone living alone who was 65 years of age or older. The average household size was 2.86 and the average family size was 3.41.

In the township the population was spread out, with 23.8% under the age of 18, 11.1% from 18 to 24, 23.8% from 25 to 44, 23.8% from 45 to 64, and 17.5% who were 65 years of age or older. The median age was 42 years. For every 100 females, there were 117.2 males. For every 100 females age 18 and over, there were 118.2 males.

The median income for a household in the township was $28,333, and the median income for a family was $30,417. Males had a median income of $25,000 versus $18,750 for females. The per capita income for the township was $10,498. There were no families and 8.7% of the population living below the poverty line, including no under eighteens and none of those over 64.
