= Turtle Lake Township, Beltrami County, Minnesota =

Turtle Lake Township, Minnesota
- Township
- Location of Turtle Lake Township, within Beltrami County, Minnesota
- Coordinates: 47°36′46″N 94°51′25″W
- Country: United States
- State: Minnesota
- County: Beltrami

Area
  - Total: 36.2 sq mi (93.7 km^{2})
  - Land: 28.8 sq mi (74.5 km^{2})
  - Water: 7.4 sq mi (19.1 km^{2})
- Elevation: 1,350 ft (410 m)

Population (2020)
  - Total: 1,299
  - Density: 45.2/sq mi (17.4/km^{2})
- Time zone: UTC-6 (Central (CST))
  - Summer (DST): UTC-5 (CDT)
- FIPS code: 27-65758
- GNIS feature ID: 0665819
- Website: turtlelaketownship.org

Turtle Lake Township is a township in Beltrami County, Minnesota, United States. The population was 1,299 as of the 2020 census.

As of 2022, the population increases to 1,313.

== History ==
This township took its name from Turtle Lake.

It has a town hall situated on the North-South Continental Divide, which was built as a school in 1898. It is on the National Register of Historic Buildings.

The stone engraving on the Minnesota tablet was erected by the State of Minnesota, Department of Conservation on August 22, 1948.

== Geography ==
According to the United States Census Bureau, the township has a total area of 36.2 square miles (93.7 km^{2}), of which 28.8 square miles (74.5 km^{2}) is land and 7.4 square miles (19.1 km^{2}), or 20.45%, is water.

=== Unincorporated towns ===
- Werner at 47.616342°N 94.922774°W

(This list is based on USGS data and may include former settlements.)

=== Lakes ===
- Bailey Lake
- Lake Beltrami (west three-quarters)
- Black Lake
- Campbell Lake (east edge)
- Crane Lake (south three-quarters)
- Fox Lake
- Horseman Lake
- Larson Lake
- Lingren Lake
- Little Turtle Lake
- Lake Julia (south half)
- Movil Lake (north three-quarters)
- Range Line Lake (vast majority)
- Rice Lake
- Silver Lake
- Three Island Lake (west half)
- Turtle Lake

=== Adjacent townships ===
- Durand Township (north)
- Hagali Township (northeast)
- Port Hope Township (east)
- Turtle River Township (southeast)
- Northern Township (south)
- Eckles Township (southwest)
- Liberty Township (west)

=== Cemeteries ===
The township contains Turtle Lake Cemetery.

== Demographics ==
Historical population
Census	Pop.	Note	%±
1900	100		—
1910	127		27.0%
1920	187		47.2%
1930	184		−1.6%
1940	308		67.4%
1950	257		−16.6%
1960	287		11.7%
1970	426		48.4%
1980	713		67.4%
1990	838		17.5%
2000	1,122		33.9%
2010	1,195		6.5%
2020	1,299		8.7%
U.S. Decennial Census

As of the census of 2000, there were 1,122 people, 429 households, and 343 families residing in the township. The population density was 39.1 inhabitants per square mile (15.1/km^{2}). There were 570 housing units at an average density of 19.9/sq mi (7.7/km^{2}). The racial makeup of the township was 95.10% White, 0.18% African American, 2.05% Native American, 0.80% Asian, 0.09% from other races, and 1.78% from two or more races. Hispanic or Latino of any race were 0.27% of the population.

There were 429 households, out of which 33.6% had children under the age of 18 living with them, 71.8% were married couples living together, 3.5% had a female householder with no husband present, and 20.0% were non-families. 16.6% of all households were made up of individuals, and 5.1% had someone living alone who was 65 years of age or older. The average household size was 2.60 and the average family size was 2.91.

In the township the population was spread out, with 25.8% under the age of 18, 4.4% from 18 to 24, 25.7% from 25 to 44, 31.9% from 45 to 64, and 12.2% who were 65 years of age or older. The median age was 42 years. For every 100 females, there were 104.4 males. For every 100 females age 18 and over, there were 108.5 males.

The median income for a household in the township was $52,857, and the median income for a family was $59,500. Males had a median income of $36,964 versus $26,731 for females. The per capita income for the township was $23,770. About 3.1% of families and 6.6% of the population were below the poverty line, including 7.0% of those under age 18 and 10.7% of those age 65 or over.
