= Bemidji Township, Beltrami County, Minnesota =

Township in Minnesota, United States

Bemidji Township, Minnesota
- Township
- Location of Bemidji Township, within Beltrami County, Minnesota
- Coordinates: 47°26′34″N 94°52′8″W
- Country: United States
- State: Minnesota
- County: Beltrami

Area
  - Total: 25.3 sq mi (65.4 km^{2})
  - Land: 20.6 sq mi (53.4 km^{2})
  - Water: 4.6 sq mi (11.9 km^{2})
- Elevation: 1,375 ft (419 m)

Population (2020)
  - Total: 2,884
  - Density: 140/sq mi (54.0/km^{2})
- Time zone: UTC-6 (Central (CST))
  - Summer (DST): UTC-5 (CDT)
- ZIP codes: 56601, 56619
- Area code: 218
- FIPS code: 27-05086
- GNIS feature ID: 0663566
- Website: bemidjitownship.gov

Bemidji Township is a township in Beltrami County, Minnesota, United States. The population was 2,884 as of the 2020 census, down from 3,134 recorded in 2010.

== Geography ==
According to the United States Census Bureau, the township has a total area of 25.3 square miles (65.4 km^{2}), of which 20.6 square miles (53.4 km^{2}) is land and 4.6 square miles (11.9 km^{2}), or 18.26%, is water.

The southern three-quarters of the city of Bemidji is within this township geographically but is a separate entity.

=== Unincorporated towns ===
- Norway Park at 47.448611°N 94.834722°W
- Rosby at 47.409953°N 94.806663°W

(This list is based on USGS data and may include former settlements.)

=== Major highways ===
- U.S. Route 2
- U.S. Route 71
- Minnesota State Highway 197

=== Lakes ===
- Carr Lake
- Lake Bemidji (south quarter)
- Lake Irving (east edge)
- Lake Marquette
- Lake Plantagenet

=== Adjacent townships ===
- Northern Township (north)
- Frohn Township (east)
- Farden Township, Hubbard County (southeast)
- Helga Township, Hubbard County (south)
- Rockwood Township, Hubbard County (southwest)
- Grant Valley Township (west)

=== Cemeteries ===
The township contains these four cemeteries: Calvary, Greenwood, Holy Cross and Nymore.

== Demographics ==
Historical population
Census	Pop.	Note	%±
1900	295		—
1910	383		29.8%
1920	457		19.3%
1930	596		30.4%
1940	802		34.6%
1950	931		16.1%
1960	970		4.2%
1970	1,622		67.2%
1980	2,270		40.0%
1990	2,660		17.2%
2000	2,934		10.3%
2010	3,134		6.8%
2020	2,884		−8.0%
U.S. Decennial Census

As of the census of 2000, there were 2,934 people, 1,012 households, and 754 families residing in the township. The population density was 139.0 inhabitants per square mile (53.7/km^{2}). There were 1,064 housing units at an average density of 50.4 per square mile (19.5/km^{2}). The racial makeup of the township was 89.37% White, 0.20% African American, 6.82% Native American, 0.41% Asian, 0.55% from other races, and 2.66% from two or more races. Hispanic or Latino of any race were 0.85% of the population.

There were 1,012 households, out of which 38.6% had children under the age of 18 living with them, 61.4% were married couples living together, 9.0% had a female householder with no husband present, and 25.4% were non-families. 18.1% of all households were made up of individuals, and 4.5% had someone living alone who was 65 years of age or older. The average household size was 2.80 and the average family size was 3.16.

In the township the population was spread out, with 28.8% under the age of 18, 13.6% from 18 to 24, 27.1% from 25 to 44, 21.9% from 45 to 64, and 8.6% who were 65 years of age or older. The median age was 32 years. For every 100 females, there were 102.9 males. For every 100 females age 18 and over, there were 100.2 males.

The median income for a household in the township was $41,279, and the median income for a family was $46,116. Males had a median income of $35,938 versus $22,973 for females. The per capita income for the township was $18,218. About 6.9% of families and 10.5% of the population were below the poverty line, including 9.6% of those under age 18 and 14.4% of those age 65 or over.
