= Lammers Township, Beltrami County, Minnesota =

Lammers Township, Minnesota
- Township
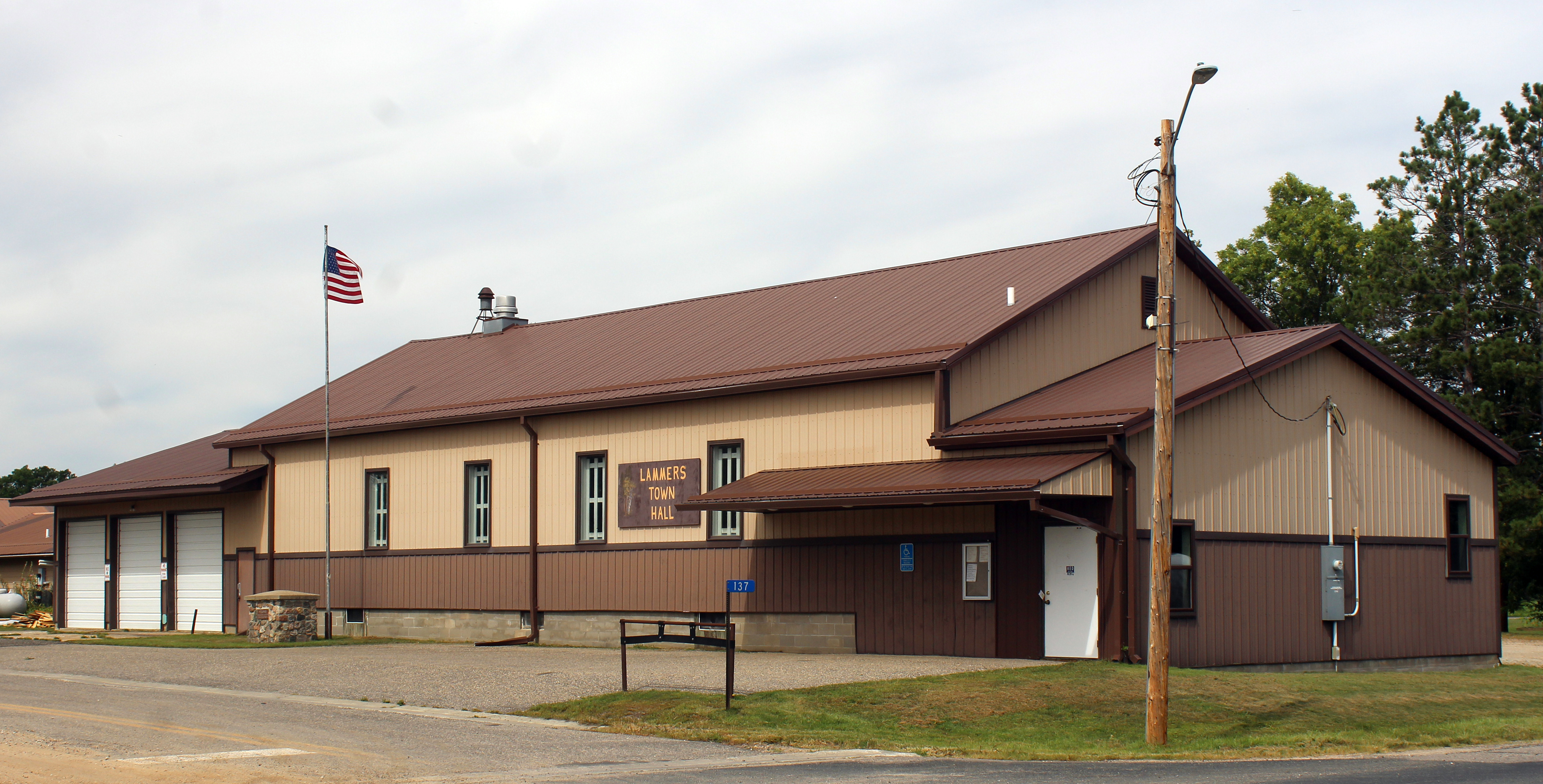
- Lammers Town Hall

- Location of Lammers Township, within Beltrami County, Minnesota
- Coordinates: 47°31′50″N 95°6′8″W
- Country: United States
- State: Minnesota
- County: Beltrami

Area
  - Total: 35.1 sq mi (90.8 km^{2})
  - Land: 34.8 sq mi (90.1 km^{2})
  - Water: 0.27 sq mi (0.7 km^{2})
- Elevation: 1,434 ft (437 m)

Population (2020)
  - Total: 602
  - Density: 17.3/sq mi (6.68/km^{2})
- Time zone: UTC-6 (Central (CST))
  - Summer (DST): UTC-5 (CDT)
- FIPS code: 27-35324
- GNIS feature ID: 0664717

Lammers Township is a township in Beltrami County, Minnesota, United States. The population was 602 at the 2020 census.

Lammers Township was named for two local businessmen, the brothers George A. and Albert J. Lammers.

== Geography ==
According to the United States Census Bureau, the township has a total area of 35.1 square miles (91 km^{2}), of which 34.8 square miles (90 km^{2}) is land and 0.3 square miles (0.78 km^{2}) (0.77%) is water.

The city of Solway is entirely within this township geographically but is a separate entity.

=== Major highway ===
- U.S. Route 2

=== Adjacent townships ===
- Buzzle Township (north)
- Liberty Township (northeast)
- Eckles Township (east)
- Grant Valley Township (southeast)
- Jones Township (south)
- Moose Creek Township, Clearwater County (southwest)
- Shevlin Township, Clearwater County (west)
- Dudley Township, Clearwater County (northwest)

=== Cemeteries ===
The township contains these two cemeteries: Lammers and Solway.

== Demographics ==
Historical population
Census	Pop.	Note	%±
1900	288		—
1910	200		−30.6%
1920	360		80.0%
1930	375		4.2%
1940	408		8.8%
1950	376		−7.8%
1960	299		−20.5%
1970	279		−6.7%
1980	386		38.4%
1990	390		1.0%
2000	492		26.2%
2010	592		20.3%
2020	602		1.7%
U.S. Decennial Census

At the 2000 census, there were 492 people, 179 households and 131 families residing in the township. The population density was 14.1 people per square mile (5.5/km^{2}). There were 190 housing units at an average density of 5.5/sq mi (2.1/km^{2}). The racial makeup of the township was 94.72% White, 2.44% Native American, 0.20% Asian, 0.20% Pacific Islander, and 2.44% from two or more races. Hispanic or Latino of any race were 1.83% of the population.

There were 179 households, of which 41.3% had children under the age of 18 living with them, 58.7% were married couples living together, 10.6% had a female householder with no husband present, and 26.3% were non-families. 21.2% of all households were made up of individuals, and 8.9% had someone living alone who was 65 years of age or older. The average household size was 2.75 and the average family size was 3.24.

The age distribution was 31.5% under the age of 18, 7.9% from 18 to 24, 27.6% from 25 to 44, 22.2% from 45 to 64, and 10.8% who were 65 years of age or older. The median age was 36 years. For every 100 females, there were 100.8 males. For every 100 females age 18 and over, there were 98.2 males.

The median household income $43,375, and the median family income was $48,125. Males had a median income of $30,250 versus $21,250 for females. The per capita income for the township was $16,894. About 9.4% of families and 12.1% of the population were below the poverty line, including 16.2% of those under age 18 and 13.5% of those age 65 or over.
