= Shooks Township, Beltrami County, Minnesota =

Shooks Township, Minnesota
- Township
- Location of Shooks Township, within Beltrami County, Minnesota
- Coordinates: 47°53′4″N 94°28′46″W
- Country: United States
- State: Minnesota
- County: Beltrami

Area
  - Total: 36.5 sq mi (94.5 km^{2})
  - Land: 36.5 sq mi (94.5 km^{2})
  - Water: 0 sq mi (0.0 km^{2})
- Elevation: 1,342 ft (409 m)

Population (2020)
  - Total: 187
  - Density: 5.13/sq mi (1.98/km^{2})
- Time zone: UTC-6 (Central (CST))
  - Summer (DST): UTC-5 (CDT)
- FIPS code: 27-59926
- GNIS feature ID: 0665602

Shooks Township is a township in Beltrami County, Minnesota, United States. The population was 187 as of the 2020 census.

Shooks Township was named for Edward Shooks, a railroad official.

== Geography ==
According to the United States Census Bureau, the township has a total area of 36.5 square miles (94.5 km^{2}), of which 36.5 square miles (94.5 km^{2}) is land and 0.03% is water.

=== Unincorporated towns ===
- Shooks at 47.874123°N 94.438291°W

(This list is based on USGS data and may include former settlements.)

=== Major highways ===
- Minnesota State Highway 1
- Minnesota State Highway 72

=== Adjacent townships ===
- Kelliher (north)
- Nore, Itasca County (southeast)
- Hornet (south)
- Langor (southwest)
- Cormant (west)
- Woodrow (northwest)

=== Cemeteries ===
The township contains Saint Joseph Cemetery.

== Demographics ==
Historical population
Census	Pop.	Note	%±
1910	58		—
1920	147		153.4%
1930	110		−25.2%
1940	207		88.2%
1950	258		24.6%
1960	242		−6.2%
1970	194		−19.8%
1980	228		17.5%
1990	217		−4.8%
2000	190		−12.4%
2010	189		−0.5%
2020	187		−1.1%
U.S. Decennial Census

As of the census of 2000, there were 190 people, 67 households, and 54 families residing in the township. The population density was 5.2 people per square mile (2.0/km^{2}). There were 79 housing units at an average density of 2.2/sq mi (0.8/km^{2}). The racial makeup of the township was 97.37% White, 1.05% Native American, and 1.58% from two or more races.

There were 67 households, out of which 32.8% had children under the age of 18 living with them, 68.7% were married couples living together, 10.4% had a female householder with no husband present, and 19.4% were non-families. 17.9% of all households were made up of individuals, and 9.0% had someone living alone who was 65 years of age or older. The average household size was 2.78 and the average family size was 3.19.

In the township the population was spread out, with 31.1% under the age of 18, 6.3% from 18 to 24, 23.7% from 25 to 44, 24.7% from 45 to 64, and 14.2% who were 65 years of age or older. The median age was 40 years. For every 100 females, there were 106.5 males. For every 100 females age 18 and over, there were 107.9 males.

The median income for a household in the township was $21,500, and the median income for a family was $25,417. Males had a median income of $24,643 versus $18,750 for females. The per capita income for the township was $10,554. About 26.3% of families and 28.6% of the population were below the poverty line, including 41.9% of those under the age of eighteen and 9.5% of those 65 or over.
