= Grant Creek =

River in Beltrami County, Minnesota

Coordinates: 47°27′16″N 95°04′20″W

Grant Creek is a stream in Beltrami County, Minnesota, in the United States.

Grant Creek was likely named for a pioneer lumberman.

== See also ==
- List of rivers of Minnesota
