= North Beltrami, Minnesota =

Unorganized territory in Beltrami County, Minnesota, US

Coordinates: 48°27′22″N 95°24′40″W

- Unorganized territory
- Location of North Beltrami, within Beltrami County, Minnesota
- Country: United States
- State: Minnesota
- County: Beltrami

Area
  - Total: 215.71 sq mi (558.7 km^{2})
  - Land: 215.50 sq mi (558.1 km^{2})
  - Water: 0.21 sq mi (0.54 km^{2})

Population (2020)
  - Total: 32
  - Density: 0.15/sq mi (0.057/km^{2})
- Time zone: UTC-6 (Central (CST))
  - Summer (DST): UTC-5 (CDT)
- Area code: 218

North Beltrami is an unorganized territory in Beltrami County, Minnesota, United States that has a population of 32 people as of the 2020 census. The population has been relatively stable, with a slight decline from 43 in 1990 to 30 in 2024.

== Geography ==
According to the United States Census Bureau, the unorganized territory has a total area of 215.8 square miles (558.9 km^{2}), of which 215.6 square miles (558.3 km^{2}) is land and 0.2 square miles (0.6 km^{2}) (0.10%) is water.

== Demographics ==
Historical population
Census	Pop.	Note	%±
1970	48		—
1980	40		−16.7%
1990	42		5.0%
2000	43		2.4%
2010	34		−20.9%
2020	32		−5.9%
U.S. Decennial Census

In the 2020 census, there were 32 people, of whom 6.6% are people under age 5, 25.3% are under 18, and 16.8% are elderly over age 65. The population density was 0.2 inhabitants per square mile (0.077/km^{2}). There were 52 housing units at an average density of 0.2 per square mile (0.077/km^{2}). The racial makeup of the unorganized territory was 72.6% White. Hispanic or Latino of any race were 2.6% of the population.

The age distribution was 23.3% under 18, 7.0% from 18 to 24, 25.6% from 25 to 44, 25.6% from 45 to 64, and 18.6% 65 or older. The median age was 42 years. For every 100 females, there were 95.5 males. For every 100 females age 18 and over, there were 120.0 males.

The median household income was $30,625, and the median family income was $36,250. Males had a median income of $35,000 versus $16,250 for females. The per capita income for the unorganized territory was $16,786. None of the population or the families were below the poverty line.
