= Maple Ridge Township, Beltrami County, Minnesota =

Maple Ridge Township
- Township
- Location of Maple Ridge Township, within Beltrami County, Minnesota
- Coordinates: 47°41′34″N 94°59′19″W
- Country: United States
- State: Minnesota
- County: Beltrami

Area
  - Total: 36.4 sq mi (94.4 km^{2})
  - Land: 34.2 sq mi (88.5 km^{2})
  - Water: 2.3 sq mi (6.0 km^{2})
- Elevation: 1,381 ft (421 m)

Population (2020)
  - Total: 113
  - Density: 3.31/sq mi (1.28/km^{2})
- Time zone: UTC-6 (Central (CST))
  - Summer (DST): UTC-5 (CDT)
- ZIP code: 56667
- Area code: 218
- FIPS code: 27-40274
- GNIS feature ID: 0664905

Maple Ridge Township is a township in Beltrami County, Minnesota, United States. The population was 113 as of the 2020 census.

Maple Ridge Township was named for the sugar maple trees growing within its borders.

== Geography ==
According to the United States Census Bureau, the township has a total area of 36.5 square miles (94.5 km^{2}), of which 34.2 square miles (88.5 km^{2}) is land and 2.3 square miles (6.0 km^{2}) (6.31%) is water.

=== Major highways ===
- Minnesota State Highway 89

=== Lakes ===
- Bog Lake
- Boston Lake
- Brass Lake
- Fahul Lake (southwest three-quarters)
- Fawn Lake
- Green Lake
- Grenn Lake
- Little Puposky Lake (vast majority)
- Muskrat Lake (north three-quarters)
- Puposky Lake (west quarter)
- Rice Lake (south quarter)
- Stray Horse Lake

=== Adjacent townships ===
- Durand Township (east)
- Nebish Township (east)
- Liberty Township (south)
- Buzzle Township (southwest)
- Roosevelt Township (west)
- Alaska Township (northwest)

== Demographics ==
Historical population
Census	Pop.	Note	%±
1900	33		—
1910	178		439.4%
1920	178		0.0%
1930	187		5.1%
1940	163		−12.8%
1950	166		1.8%
1960	94		−43.4%
1970	96		2.1%
1980	117		21.9%
1990	95		−18.8%
2000	108		13.7%
2010	104		−3.7%
2020	113		8.7%
U.S. Decennial Census

As of the census of 2000, there were 108 people, 42 households, and 33 families residing in the township. The population density was 3.2 inhabitants per square mile (1.2/km^{2}). There were 50 housing units at an average density of 1.5 per square mile (0.58/km^{2}). The racial makeup of the township was 88.89% White, 9.26% Native American, 1.85% from other races. Hispanic or Latino of any race were 1.85% of the population.

There were 42 households, out of which 38.1% had children under the age of 18 living with them, 57.1% were married couples living together, 11.9% had a female householder with no husband present, and 21.4% were non-families. 19.0% of all households were made up of individuals, and 7.1% had someone living alone who was 65 years of age or older. The average household size was 2.57 and the average family size was 2.91.

In the township the population was spread out, with 26.9% under the age of 18, 6.5% from 18 to 24, 31.5% from 25 to 44, 18.5% from 45 to 64, and 16.7% who were 65 years of age or older. The median age was 36 years. For every 100 females, there were 116.0 males. For every 100 females age 18 and over, there were 125.7 males.

The median income for a household in the township was $30,625, and the median income for a family was $33,125. Males had a median income of $20,625 versus $18,750 for females. The per capita income for the township was $13,615. There were 6.5% of families and 13.5% of the population living below the poverty line, including 11.1% of under eighteens and 16.0% of those over 64.
