= Nebish Township, Beltrami County, Minnesota =

Nebish Township, Minnesota
- Township
- Location of Nebish Township, within Beltrami County, Minnesota
- Coordinates: 47°46′6″N 94°51′34″W
- Country: United States
- State: Minnesota
- County: Beltrami

Area
  - Total: 35.9 sq mi (93.0 km^{2})
  - Land: 34.3 sq mi (88.8 km^{2})
  - Water: 1.6 sq mi (4.1 km^{2})
- Elevation: 1,375 ft (419 m)

Population (2020)
  - Total: 279
  - Density: 8.14/sq mi (3.14/km^{2})
- Time zone: UTC-6 (Central (CST))
  - Summer (DST): UTC-5 (CDT)
- ZIP code: 56667
- Area code: 218
- FIPS code: 27-45088
- GNIS feature ID: 0665073

Nebish Township is a township in Beltrami County, Minnesota, United States. The population was 279 as of the 2020 census.

Nebish is derived from the Ojibwe-language word meaning "tea".

== Geography ==
According to the United States Census Bureau, the township has a total area of 35.9 square miles (93.0 km^{2}), of which 34.3 square miles (88.8 km^{2}) is land and 1.6 square miles (4.1 km^{2}) (4.46%) is water.

=== Unincorporated towns ===
- Nebish at 47.771344°N 94.847486°W

(This list is based on USGS data and may include former settlements.)

=== Lakes ===
- Anderson Lake
- Bass Lake
- Dark Lake
- George Lake (northeast three-quarters)
- Hagali Lake (west edge)
- Jacks Lake
- Little Rice Lake
- Long Slough Lake (northwest half)
- Markus Lake
- Nebish Lake
- Polly Wog Lake
- Rice Lake
- Silver Lake
- Smyth Lake
- White Fish Lake (west half)

=== Adjacent townships ===
- Hagali Township (east)
- O'Brien Township (east)
- Durand Township (south)
- Alaska Township (west)
- Maple Ridge Township (west)

== Demographics ==
Historical population
Census	Pop.	Note	%±
1900	119		—
1910	134		12.6%
1920	413		208.2%
1930	323		−21.8%
1940	361		11.8%
1950	281		−22.2%
1960	286		1.8%
1970	272		−4.9%
1980	292		7.4%
1990	301		3.1%
2000	318		5.6%
2010	290		−8.8%
2020	279		−3.8%
U.S. Decennial Census

As of the census of 2000, there were 318 people, 110 households, and 88 families residing in the township. The population density was 9.3 people per square mile (3.6/km^{2}). There were 127 housing units at an average density of 3.7/sq mi (1.4/km^{2}). The racial makeup of the township was 98.43% White, 0.31% Native American, and 1.26% from two or more races. Hispanic or Latino of any race were 0.63% of the population.

There were 110 households, out of which 44.5% had children under the age of 18 living with them, 60.9% were married couples living together, 10.9% had a female householder with no husband present, and 19.1% were non-families. 15.5% of all households were made up of individuals, and 6.4% had someone living alone who was 65 years of age or older. The average household size was 2.89 and the average family size was 3.17.

In the township the population was spread out, with 31.8% under the age of 18, 6.9% from 18 to 24, 28.6% from 25 to 44, 18.2% from 45 to 64, and 14.5% who were 65 years of age or older. The median age was 36 years. For every 100 females, there were 107.8 males. For every 100 females age 18 and over, there were 97.3 males.

The median income for a household in the township was $40,833, and the median income for a family was $39,500. Males had a median income of $37,045 versus $19,375 for females. The per capita income for the township was $13,204. About 12.8% of families and 15.0% of the population were below the poverty line, including 8.7% of those under age 18 and 8.5% of those age 65 or over.
