= Roosevelt Township, Beltrami County, Minnesota =

Roosevelt Township, Minnesota
- Township
- Location of Roosevelt Township, within Beltrami County, Minnesota
- Coordinates: 47°43′56″N 95°7′47″W
- Country: United States
- State: Minnesota
- County: Beltrami

Area
  - Total: 35.9 sq mi (93.1 km^{2})
  - Land: 34.1 sq mi (88.2 km^{2})
  - Water: 1.9 sq mi (4.9 km^{2})
- Elevation: 1,391 ft (424 m)

Population (2020)
  - Total: 225
  - Density: 6.61/sq mi (2.55/km^{2})
- Time zone: UTC-6 (Central (CST))
  - Summer (DST): UTC-5 (CDT)
- FIPS code: 27-55402
- GNIS feature ID: 0665454

Roosevelt Township is a township in Beltrami County, Minnesota, United States. The population was 225 as of the 2020 census.

Roosevelt Township was named for Theodore Roosevelt, 26th President of the United States.

== Geography ==
According to the United States Census Bureau, the township has a total area of 35.9 square miles (93.1 km^{2}), of which 34.1 square miles (88.2 km^{2}) is land and 1.9 square miles (4.9 km^{2}) (5.23%) is water.

=== Unincorporated towns ===
- Debs at 47.731344°N 95.128056°W

(This list is based on USGS data and may include former settlements.)

=== Lakes ===
- Clearwater Lake
- Haggerty Lake (vast majority)
- Iverson Lake
- Myrtle Lake
- Perch Lake
- Sandy Lake
- White Fish Lake

=== Adjacent townships ===
- Alaska Township (northeast)
- Maple Ridge Township (east)
- Buzzle Township (south)
- Dudley Township, Clearwater County (southwest)
- Sinclair Township, Clearwater County (west)
- Clover Township, Clearwater County (northwest)

=== Cemeteries ===
The township contains Trinity Cemetery.

== Demographics ==
Historical population
Census	Pop.	Note	%±
1900	42		—
1910	227		440.5%
1920	308		35.7%
1930	336		9.1%
1940	384		14.3%
1950	308		−19.8%
1960	208		−32.5%
1970	165		−20.7%
1980	165		0.0%
1990	180		9.1%
2000	219		21.7%
2010	225		2.7%
2020	225		0.0%
U.S. Decennial Census

As of the census of 2000, there were 219 people, 98 households, and 60 families residing in the township. The population density was 6.4 people per square mile (2.5/km^{2}). There were 148 housing units at an average density of 4.3/sq mi (1.7/km^{2}). The racial makeup of the township was 96.35% White, 0.91% Native American, and 2.74% from two or more races. Hispanic or Latino of any race were 0.46% of the population.

There were 98 households, out of which 26.5% had children under the age of 18 living with them, 53.1% were married couples living together, 5.1% had a female householder with no husband present, and 37.8% were non-families. 27.6% of all households were made up of individuals, and 11.2% had someone living alone who was 65 years of age or older. The average household size was 2.23 and the average family size was 2.72.

In the township the population was spread out, with 20.1% under the age of 18, 6.4% from 18 to 24, 26.9% from 25 to 44, 30.6% from 45 to 64, and 16.0% who were 65 years of age or older. The median age was 44 years. For every 100 females, there were 95.5 males. For every 100 females age 18 and over, there were 86.2 males.

The median income for a household in the township was $25,893, and the median income for a family was $31,875. Males had a median income of $25,625 versus $16,964 for females. The per capita income for the township was $14,057. About 15.6% of families and 19.5% of the population were below the poverty line, including none of those under the age of eighteen and 36.4% of those 65 or over.
