= Hornet Township, Beltrami County, Minnesota =

Hornet Township, Minnesota
- Township
- Location of Hornet Township, within Beltrami County, Minnesota
- Coordinates: 47°48′3″N 94°31′22″W
- Country: United States
- State: Minnesota
- County: Beltrami

Area
  - Total: 35.8 sq mi (92.8 km^{2})
  - Land: 35.8 sq mi (92.7 km^{2})
  - Water: 0.039 sq mi (0.1 km^{2})
- Elevation: 1,342 ft (409 m)

Population (2020)
  - Total: 209
  - Density: 5.84/sq mi (2.25/km^{2})
- Time zone: UTC-6 (Central (CST))
  - Summer (DST): UTC-5 (CDT)
- ZIP code: 56630
- Area code: 218
- FIPS code: 27-30194
- GNIS feature ID: 0664519

Hornet Township is a township in Beltrami County, Minnesota, United States. The population was 209 as of the 2020 census.

== Geography ==
According to the United States Census Bureau, the township has a total area of 35.8 square miles (93 km^{2}), of which 35.8 square miles (93 km^{2}) is land and 0.04 square miles (0.10 km^{2}) (0.11%) is water.

The city of Funkley is entirely within this township geographically but is a separate entity.

=== Major highway ===
- U.S. Route 71

=== Lakes ===
- Borden Lake

=== Adjacent townships ===
- Shooks Township (north)
- Nore Township, Itasca County (east)
- Moose Park Township, Itasca County (southeast)
- Summit Township (south)
- Hines Township (southwest)
- Langor Township (west)
- Cormant Township (northwest)

== Demographics ==
Historical population
Census	Pop.	Note	%±
1900	52		—
1910	143		175.0%
1920	383		167.8%
1930	269		−29.8%
1940	357		32.7%
1950	260		−27.2%
1960	210		−19.2%
1970	179		−14.8%
1980	219		22.3%
1990	225		2.7%
2000	227		0.9%
2010	232		2.2%
2020	209		−9.9%
U.S. Decennial Census

As of the census of 2000, there were 227 people, 80 households, and 64 families residing in the township. The population density was 6.3 inhabitants per square mile (2.4/km^{2}). There were 106 housing units at an average density of 3.0 per square mile (1.2/km^{2}). The racial makeup of the township was 93.83% White, 1.32% Native American, 0.44% Asian, and 4.41% from two or more races. Hispanic or Latino of any race were 1.32% of the population.

There were 80 households, out of which 38.8% had children under the age of 18 living with them, 63.8% were married couples living together, 12.5% had a female householder with no husband present, and 20.0% were non-families. 13.8% of all households were made up of individuals, and 3.8% had someone living alone who was 65 years of age or older. The average household size was 2.84 and the average family size was 3.11.

In the township the population was spread out, with 29.5% under the age of 18, 8.4% from 18 to 24, 20.7% from 25 to 44, 31.3% from 45 to 64, and 10.1% who were 65 years of age or older. The median age was 36 years. For every 100 females, there were 120.4 males. For every 100 females age 18 and over, there were 110.5 males.

The median income for a household in the township was $36,250, and the median income for a family was $39,167. Males had a median income of $26,667 versus $21,786 for females. The per capita income for the township was $14,578. About 15.7% of families and 22.6% of the population were below the poverty line, including 29.7% of those under the age of eighteen and 7.4% of those 65 or over.
