= Minnesota State Highway 197 =

State highway in Minnesota, United States

Trunk Highway 197
- MN 197 highlighted in red

Route information
- Maintained by MnDOT
- Length: 6.997 mi (11.261 km)
- Existed: 1985–present
- Tourist routes: Great River Road

Major junctions
- South end: US 2 / US 71 near Bemidji
- North end: US 2 / US 71 at Bemidji

Location
- Country: United States
- State: Minnesota
- Counties: Beltrami

Highway system
- Minnesota Trunk Highway System; Interstate; US; State; Legislative; Scenic
← MN 194	→ MN 200

Minnesota State Highway 197 (MN 197) is a 6.997-mile-long (11.261 km) highway in northwest Minnesota, which runs from its first interchange with U.S. Highways 2 and 71 on the southeast edge of Bemidji and continues north and then west to its second interchange with U.S. Highways 2 and 71 on the northwest edge of Bemidji.

The route passes through the heart of the city of Bemidji.

Highway 197 is also known as Washington Avenue, Bemidji Avenue, and Paul Bunyan Drive at various points throughout its route.

== Route description ==
Highway 197 serves as a north–south and an east–west business route through the city of Bemidji. The roadway functions essentially as a business route for U.S. Highways 2 and 71.

Highway 197 passes in between Lake Irving and Lake Bemidji on the south side of the city.

== History ==
Highway 197 was originally numbered 2 and 71 as part of old U.S. Highways 2 and 71 through the city of Bemidji.

In the mid 1980s, the new Highway 2 / 71 four-lane bypass of Bemidji was constructed. The original route through the city was renumbered 197 at this time.

The original route through Bemidji (now 197) had been paved by the 1930s.

197 had been marked as "Highway 197 Thru City" on both ends. In 2004, the new signs no longer read "Thru City".

== Major intersections ==
The entire route is in Beltrami County.

Location	mi	km	Destinations	Notes
Bemidji Township	0.000	0.000	US 2 / US 71 – Park Rapids, Grand Rapids	Interchange
Bemidji			Great River Road (National Route) south (1st Street)	Southern end of Great River Road overlap
Mississippi River	2.805– 2.844	4.514– 4.577	Paul Bunyan Drive Bridge	
Bemidji			Great River Road (National Route) north (5th Street)	Northern end of Great River Road overlap
Bemidji	6.130– 6.138	9.865– 9.878	US 71 – International Falls	
Bemidji	6.997	11.261	US 2 west – Crookston	Westbound exit and eastbound entrance only
1.000 mi = 1.609 km; 1.000 km = 0.621 mi: Incomplete access
