= Minnesota State Highway 72 =

Highway in Minnesota

Trunk Highway 72
- MN 72 highlighted in red

Route information
- Maintained by MnDOT
- Length: 76.810 mi (123.614 km)
- Existed: 1923–present

Major junctions
- South end: US 71 at Blackduck
- MN 1 at Shooks; MN 11 at Baudette
- North end: Highway 11 at the Canadian border in Baudette

Location
- Country: United States
- State: Minnesota
- Counties: Beltrami, Lake of the Woods

Highway system
- Minnesota Trunk Highway System; Interstate; US; State; Legislative; Scenic
← US 71	→ MN 73

Minnesota State Highway 72 (MN 72) is a 76.810-mile-long (123.614 km) highway in northwest Minnesota, which runs from its intersection with U.S. 71 in Blackduck and continues north to its northern terminus at the Canada–US border in Baudette. The road continues as Ontario Highway 11 upon entering the town of Rainy River, Ontario at the Baudette-Rainy River International Bridge.

== Route description ==
State Highway 72 serves as a north–south route between the communities of Blackduck, Shooks, Kelliher, and Baudette.

The roadway passes through the Red Lake State Forest in northeast Beltrami County between Kelliher and Waskish. Big Bog State Recreation Area is located on Highway 72, immediately north of Waskish.

Highway 72 crosses the Rainy River at Baudette.

== History ==
State Highway 72 was authorized as one of the first two Minnesota legislative routes in 1923. This portion of the route was located between Blackduck and Baudette.

The route was paved by 1942.

At one time, Highway 72 had continued farther north, extending over what is now State Highway 172 in Lake of the Woods County. The section of present-day Minnesota 172 between State Highway 11 (at Baudette) and Wheeler's Point (at Lake of the Woods) was originally designated Minnesota 72 as well between 1934 and 1963.

== Major intersections ==
County	Location	mi	km	Destinations	Notes
Beltrami	Blackduck	0.000	0.000	US 71 – Bemidji	
Beltrami	Hines Township	1.829	2.943	CSAH 32 west – Nebish	
Beltrami	Hornet Township	6.895	11.096	CSAH 41 east	
Beltrami	Shooks Township	9.910	15.949	MN 1 west – Redby CSAH 36 north	West end of MN 1 overlap
Beltrami	Shooks	14.970	24.092	MN 1 east – Northome	East end of MN 1 overlap
Beltrami	Kelliher	19.586	31.521	CSAH 36 west	
Beltrami	Kelliher	19.696	31.698	CSAH 36 east	
Beltrami	Shotley Brook	29.752	47.881	CSAH 23 west – Shotley	
Lake of the Woods	Swiftwater Township	59.889	96.382	CSAH 1 west (Wilderness Drive)	
Lake of the Woods	Township 158-30	62.375	100.383	CSAH 16 east (Hay Creek Road)	
Lake of the Woods	Boone Township	62.873	101.184	CSAH 16 west (51st Street SE)	
Lake of the Woods	Rapid River Township	65.878	106.020	CSAH 7 east (39th Street SE)	
Lake of the Woods	Gudrid Township	71.875	115.672	CSAH 19 east (15th Street SE)	
Lake of the Woods	Baudette	73.880	118.898	CSAH 35	
Lake of the Woods	Baudette	74.680	120.186	MN 11 east – International Falls	East end of MN 11 overlap
Lake of the Woods	Baudette	76.377	122.917	MN 11 west – Warroad, Roseau	West end of MN 11 overlap
Lake of the Woods	Baudette	76.518	123.144	CSAH 26 west (2nd Street NE)	
Rainy River		76.864	123.701	Highway 11 east – Rainy River	
1.000 mi = 1.609 km; 1.000 km = 0.621 mi: Concurrency terminus
