= Clover Township, Clearwater County, Minnesota =

Township in Minnesota, United States

Clover Township
- Township
- Location of Clover Township, within Clearwater County, Minnesota
- Coordinates: 47°46′20″N 95°14′14″W
- Country: United States
- State: Minnesota
- County: Clearwater

Area
  - Total: 17.6 sq mi (45.7 km^{2})
  - Land: 17.1 sq mi (44.2 km^{2})
  - Water: 0.58 sq mi (1.5 km^{2})
- Elevation: 1,263 ft (385 m)

Population (2020)
  - Total: 88
  - Density: 5.2/sq mi (2.0/km^{2})
- Time zone: UTC-6 (Central (CST))
  - Summer (DST): UTC-5 (CDT)
- ZIP code: 56652
- Area code: 218
- FIPS code: 27-12214
- GNIS feature ID: 0663834

Clover Township is a township in Clearwater County, Minnesota, United States. The population was 88 at the 2020 census.

Clover Township was organized in 1914.

== Geography ==
According to the United States Census Bureau, the township has a total area of 17.6 square miles (46 km^{2}), of which 17.1 square miles (44 km^{2}) is land and 0.6 square miles (1.6 km^{2}) (3.34%) is water.

== Demographics ==
As of the census of 2000, there were 116 people, 49 households, and 29 families residing in the township. The population density was 6.8 inhabitants per square mile (2.6/km^{2}). There were 59 housing units at an average density of 3.5 per square mile (1.4/km^{2}). The racial makeup of the township was 90.52% White, 8.62% Native American, and 0.86% from two or more races.

There were 49 households, out of which 18.4% had children under the age of 18 living with them, 53.1% were married couples living together, 6.1% had a female householder with no husband present, and 38.8% were non-families. 36.7% of all households were made up of individuals, and 8.2% had someone living alone who was 65 years of age or older. The average household size was 2.37 and the average family size was 3.17.

In the township the population was spread out, with 27.6% under the age of 18, 3.4% from 18 to 24, 21.6% from 25 to 44, 32.8% from 45 to 64, and 14.7% who were 65 years of age or older. The median age was 43 years. For every 100 females, there were 141.7 males. For every 100 females age 18 and over, there were 133.3 males.

The median income for a household in the township was $32,083, and the median income for a family was $39,375. Males had a median income of $26,250 versus $25,417 for females. The per capita income for the township was $16,248. There were 17.1% of families and 27.0% of the population living below the poverty line, including 47.1% of under eighteens and none of those over 64.
