= Minnesota State Highway 89 =

State highway in Minnesota, United States

Trunk Highway 89
- MN 89 highlighted in red

Route information
- Maintained by MnDOT
- Length: 143.650 mi (231.182 km)
- Existed: 1933–present

Major junctions
- South end: US 2 near Bemidji
- MN 1 at Red Lake; MN 219 near Grygla; MN 11 / MN 310 at Roseau
- North end: PTH 89 at the Canadian border near Pinecreek

Location
- Country: United States
- State: Minnesota
- Counties: Beltrami, Clearwater, Marshall, Roseau

Highway system
- Minnesota Trunk Highway System; Interstate; US; State; Legislative; Scenic
← MN 87	→ I-90

Minnesota State Highway 89 (MN 89) is a 143.650-mile-long (231.182 km) highway in northwest Minnesota, which runs from its intersection with U.S. Highway 2 at Eckles Township, just north of Wilton (near Bemidji) and continues north to its northern terminus at the Canada–United States border, where it becomes Manitoba Highway 89, near Pinecreek.

The highway runs around the west side of Red Lake between Bemidji and Roseau. "Moose" signs can be seen along this route.

== Route description ==
Highway 89 serves as a north–south route between Bemidji, Red Lake, Grygla, Roseau, and the Canadian border.

The route is also known as 5th Avenue SW in the city of Roseau.

Hayes Lake State Park is located 9 miles east of the junction of Highway 89 and Roseau County Road 4. The park entrance is located on Roseau County Road 4.

Highway 89 is concurrent with State Highway 1 for 28 miles (45 km) on the southwest side of Red Lake. This is the longest concurrency with another state highway within Minnesota.

A new U.S. Highway 2 interchange with State Highway 89 in Eckles Township is planned for 2012.

The route is legally defined as Legislative Routes 136 and 218 in the Minnesota Statutes. It is not marked with these numbers.

== History ==
Highway 89 was authorized in 1933 from U.S. 2 near Bemidji to State Highway 11 at Roseau. The route was extended in 1949 from State Highway 11 to the Canadian border.

The route was mostly gravel in 1953. The last section to be paved was the west side of Red Lake, c. 1963.

Adjoining Manitoba Highway 89 was numbered to correspond with Minnesota Highway 89.

== Major intersections ==
County	Location	mi	km	Destinations	Notes
Beltrami	Eckles Township	0.000	0.000	US 2 – Bemidji, Bagley	
Beltrami	Red Lake Indian Reservation	26.031	41.893	MN 1 east – Red Lake	South end of MN 1 overlap
Clearwater	No major junctions				
Beltrami	Red Lake Indian Reservation	53.975	86.864	MN 1 west – Thief River Falls	North end of MN 1 overlap
Marshall	Eckvoll Township	86.861	139.789	MN 219 south – Goodridge	
Roseau	Roseau	125.302	201.654	MN 11 east / MN 310 north – Warroad, Canada	East end of MN 11 overlap
Roseau	Fox	131.406	211.477	MN 11 west – Greenbush	West end of MN 11 overlap
Roseau	Ross Township	132.712	213.579	MN 308 south – Greenbush	
Roseau	Dieter Township	143.967	231.692	PTH 89 north – Piney	Continuation into Manitoba
1.000 mi = 1.609 km; 1.000 km = 0.621 mi: Concurrency terminus
