= Seven Clans Casinos =

Coordinates: 47°48′11″N 95°1′29″W

Seven Clans Casinos is a tribal gaming enterprise owned and operated by the Red Lake Band of Chippewa Indians. This consists of three casinos:

- Seven Clans Casino Red Lake in Red Lake, Minnesota
- Seven Clans Casino Warroad (formerly called the Lake of the Woods Bingo and Casino) in Warroad, Minnesota
- Seven Clans Casino Thief River Falls, south of Thief River Falls, Minnesota.

Red Lake Nation also operates the Super 8 and Lakeview Restaurant in Warroad, Minnesota. Seven Clans Casinos is operated under Red Lake Gaming Enterprises and is licensed under the Red Lake Gaming Commission.

== See also ==
- List of casinos in Minnesota
