= 2019–20 Valparaiso Crusaders women's basketball team =

Intercollegiate basketball season

2019–20 Valparaiso Crusaders women's basketball
- Conference: Missouri Valley Conference
- Record: 17–12 (9–9 MVC)
- Head coach: Mary Evans (2nd season)
- Assistant coaches: Gabby Johnson; Dani Franklin; Mark Schwitznagel
- Home arena: Athletics–Recreation Center

2019–20 Missouri Valley Conference women's basketball standings
	Conf.				Overall
Team	W		L	PCT	W		L	PCT
No. 23 Missouri State	16	–	2	.889	26	–	4	.867
Drake	14	–	4	.778	22	–	8	.733
Bradley	13	–	5	.722	22	–	7	.759
Illinois State	11	–	7	.611	19	–	10	.655
Northern Iowa	10	–	8	.556	18	–	11	.621
Valparaiso	9	–	9	.500	17	–	12	.586
Southern Illinois	8	–	10	.444	16	–	13	.552
Loyola	6	–	12	.333	15	–	14	.517
Indiana State	3	–	15	.167	5	–	25	.167
Evansville	0	–	18	.000	3	–	26	.103
† 2020 MVC tournament winner Rankings from AP poll

The 2019–20 Valparaiso Crusaders women's basketball team represented Valparaiso University during the 2019–20 NCAA Division I women's basketball season. The Crusaders, led by second-year head coach Mary Evans, played their home games at the Athletics–Recreation Center as members of the Missouri Valley Conference. They sought to reach their first NCAA Tournament since 2004. Their season ended when the MVC tournament was canceled due to the COVID-19 pandemic.

== Roster ==
2019–20 Valparaiso Crusaders women's basketball team
Players
Coaches

Pos.	#	Name	Height	Year	Previous school	Hometown
G	0	Maya Meredith	5 ft 7 in (1.7 m)	Sr	Cathedral	Indianapolis, IN
G/F	1	Grace White	5 ft 10 in (1.78 m)	RS Jr	Red Lake	Redby, MN
G/F	2	Cara VanKempen	6 ft 0 in (1.83 m)	Fr	Coopersville	Coopersville, MI
G	3	Alexis Cowan	5 ft 7 in (1.7 m)	RS Sr	Auburn	Bolingbrook, IL
G	4	Ilysse Pitts	5 ft 7 in (1.7 m)	So	Montini	Aurora, IL
G	5	Shay Frederick	5 ft 7 in (1.7 m)	So	Hortonville	Greenville, WI
F	11	Marlee Profitt	6 ft 2 in (1.88 m)	RS Jr	Medina	Medina, OH
G/F	12	Addison Stoller	6 ft 0 in (1.83 m)	RS Jr	Cissna Park	Cissna Park, IL
F	13	Ella Ellenson	6 ft 2 in (1.88 m)	Jr	Rice Lake	Rice Lake, WI
G	15	Carrie Weinman	5 ft 9 in (1.75 m)	RS So	Denver	Glenview, IL
G	20	Nicole Konieczny	5 ft 9 in (1.75 m)	RS So	South Bend Saint Joseph	Granger, IN
G	24	Zoe MacKay Zacker	5 ft 10 in (1.78 m)	Fr	Montini	St. Charles, IL
G/F	25	Grace Hales	6 ft 0 in (1.83 m)	Sr	Westview	Cromwell, IN
F	40	Caitlin Morrison	6 ft 2 in (1.88 m)	RS Jr	Glenbrook South	Glenview, IL

Head coach

- Mary Evans (Georgia Southern)

Assistant coach(es)

- Gabby Johnson (Thomas More)
- Dani Franklin (Valparaiso)
- Mark Schwitzgable (Ohio)

Legend

- (C) Team captain
- (S) Suspended
- (I) Ineligible
- (W) Walk-on
- Injured
- Current redshirt

Roster
Last update: March 1, 2020

== Schedule and results ==
Date time, TV	Rank^{#}	Opponent^{#}	Result	Record	Site (attendance) city, state
Non-conference regular season
Nov 10, 2019*; 1:00 pm		vs. Ohio State	L 38–89	0–1	Pam Evans Smith Arena (1,857); Springfield, OH
Nov 15, 2019*; 7:00 pm, Midco Sports Network		at North Dakota State	W 66–54	1–1	Scheels Center (766); Fargo, ND
Nov 17, 2019*; 2:00 pm, Fox Sports North		at North Dakota	L 63–65	1–2	Betty Engelstad Sioux Center (1,582); Grand Forks, ND
Nov 21, 2018*; 7:00 pm, BTN+		at Northwestern	L 48–69	1–3	Welsh-Ryan Arena (678); Evanston, IL
Nov 24, 2019*; 1:00 pm, ESPN+		Bowling Green	W 95–90 ^{OT}	2–3	Athletics–Recreation Center (382); Valparaiso, IN
Nov 27, 2019*; 7:00 pm, ESPN+		at Toledo	W 61–54	3–3	Savage Arena (3,319); Toledo, OH
Dec 5, 2019*; 6:30 pm, ESPN3		at Detroit Mercy	W 77–58	4–3	Calihan Hall (4,574); Detroit, MI
Dec 15, 2019*; 1:00 pm, ESPN3		UIC	W 63–37	5–3	Athletics–Recreation Center (302); Valparaiso, IN
Dec 17, 2019*; 6:00 pm, ESPN+		Morehead State	W 55–53	6–3	Athletics–Recreation Center (274); Valparaiso, IN
Dec 28, 2019*; 1:00 pm, ESPN3		Chicago State	W 95–49	7–3	Athletics–Recreation Center (273); Valparaiso, IN
Dec 30, 2018*; 4:00 pm, ESPN+		at Eastern Illinois	W 78–66	8–3	Lantz Arena (451); Charleston, IL
MVC regular season
Jan 3, 2020; 1:00 pm, ESPN3		Southern Illinois	L 51–67	8–4 (0–1)	Athletics–Recreation Center (406); Valparaiso, IN
Jan 5, 2020; 1:00 pm, ESPN3		No. 21 Missouri State	L 68–81	8–5 (0–2)	Athletics–Recreation Center (431); Valparaiso, IN
Jan 10, 2020; 4:00 pm, ESPN+		at Indiana State	W 75–56	9–5 (1–2)	Hulman Center (1,334); Terre Haute, IN
Jan 12, 2020; 6:00 pm, ESPN+		at Evansville	W 88–66	10–5 (2–2)	Meeks Family Fieldhouse (286); Evansville, IN
Jan 17, 2020; 6:00 pm, ESPN+		Illinois State	L 60–72	10–6 (2–3)	Athletics–Recreation Center (412); Valparaiso, IN
Jan 19, 2020; 1:00 pm, ESPN+		Bradley	L 61–75	10–7 (2–4)	Athletics–Recreation Center (444); Valparaiso, IN
Jan 24, 2020; 6:00 pm, ESPN3		Loyola–Chicago	W 66–64	11–7 (3–4)	Athletics–Recreation Center (461); Valparaiso, IN
Jan 31, 2020; 6:00 pm, ESPN+		at Drake	L 66–87	11–8 (3–5)	Knapp Center (2,789); Des Moines, IA
Feb 2, 2020; 2:00 pm, ESPN+		at Northern Iowa	L 70–77	11–9 (3–6)	McLeod Center (1,538); Cedar Falls, IA
Feb 6, 2020; 6:00 pm, ESPN+		Evansville	W 72–54	12–9 (4–6)	Athletics–Recreation Center (347); Valparaiso, IN
Jan 8, 2020; 1:00 pm, ESPN3		Indiana State	W 61–45	13–9 (5–6)	Athletics–Recreation Center (554); Valparaiso, IN
Feb 14, 2020; 7:00 pm, ESPN+		at Bradley	L 69–90	13–10 (5–7)	Renaissance Coliseum (767); Peoria, IL
Feb 16, 2020; 2:00 pm, ESPN+		at Illinois State	W 78–70	14–10 (6–7)	Redbird Arena (1,668); Normal, IL
Feb 22, 2020; 2:00 pm, ESPN3		at Loyola–Chicago	W 70–57	15–10 (7–7)	Joseph J. Gentile Arena (638); Chicago, IL
Feb 28, 2020; 6:00 pm, ESPN+		Northern Iowa	W 72–69	16–10 (8–7)	Athletics–Recreation Center (612); Valparaiso, IN
Mar 1, 2020; 1:00 pm, ESPN+		Drake	L 79–83	16–11 (8–8)	Athletics–Recreation Center (479); Valparaiso, IN
Mar 5, 2020; 7:00 pm, ESPN+		at No. 23 Missouri State	L 70–85	16–12 (8–9)	JQH Arena (2,861); Springfield, MO
Mar 7, 2020; 2:00 pm, ESPN3		at Southern Illinois	W 69–58	17–12 (9–9)	Banterra Center (520); Carbondale, IL
MVC tournament
Cancelled due to the COVID-19 pandemic
*Non-conference game. ^{#}Rankings from AP Poll. (#) Tournament seedings in parentheses. All times are in Central Time.

== See also ==
2019–20 Valparaiso Crusaders men's basketball team
