= Red Lake Indian Reservation =

Home to the federally recognized Red Lake Band of Ojibwe

Red Lake Indian Reservation Miskwaagamiiwi-zaaga'iganing
- Indian reservation
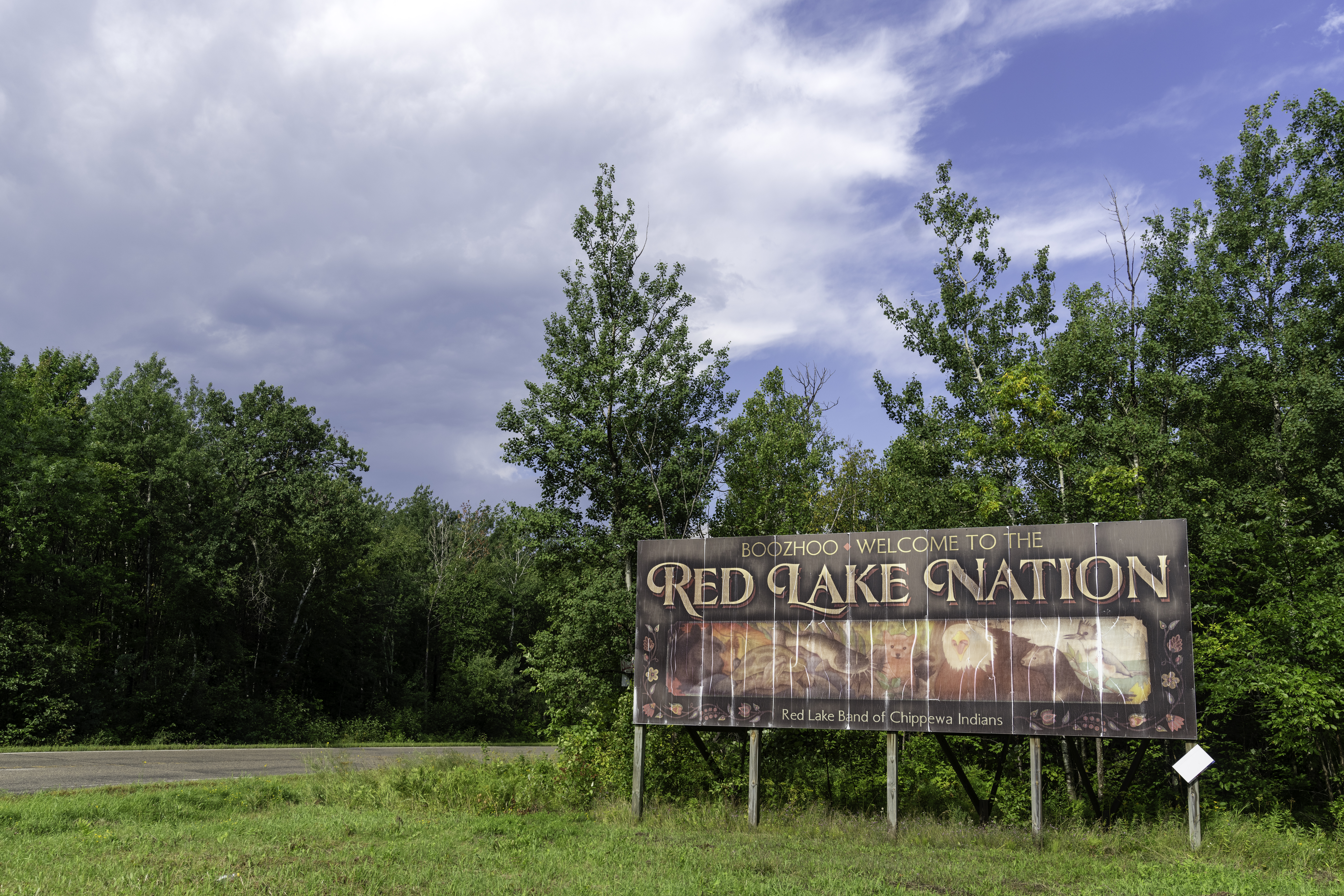
- Red Lake welcome sign in Bejou, Minnesota in 2023

- Flag

- Location in Minnesota
- Country: United States
- Tribe: Red Lake Band of Chippewa
- State: Minnesota
- Counties: Beltrami; Clearwater
- Headquarters: Red Lake

Government
  - Body: Tribal Council
  - Chairman: Darrell G. Seki, Sr.
  - Secretary: Sam Strong
  - Treasurer: Vernelle R. Lussier

Area
  - Total: 1,260.32 sq mi (3,264.2 km^{2})
  - Land: 883.087 sq mi (2,287.18 km^{2})
  - Water: 377.233 sq mi (977.03 km^{2}) 29.9%

Population (2020)
  - Total: 5,506
  - Density: 6.2/sq mi (2.4/km^{2})
- Website: redlakenation.org

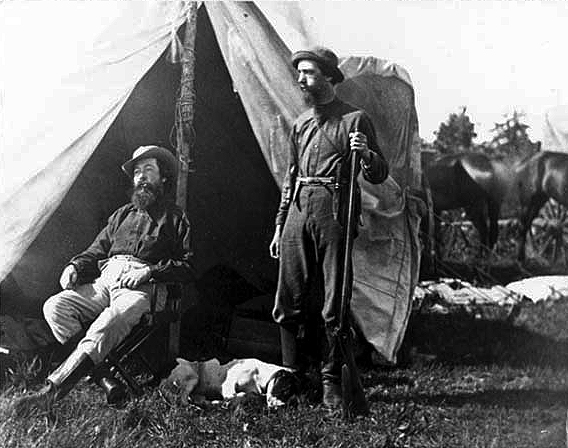
U.S. Indian Commissioner William P. Dole seated, John G. Nicolay (Lincoln's private Secretary) standing at Big Lake encampment, Sherburne County, Minnesota mid-August 1862. They were en route to make a treaty with the Red lake and Pembina bands on the Red River that was postponed due to the Sioux. It had been planned for August 25th. Nicolay had been sent as Lincoln's personal representative to the Chippewa.

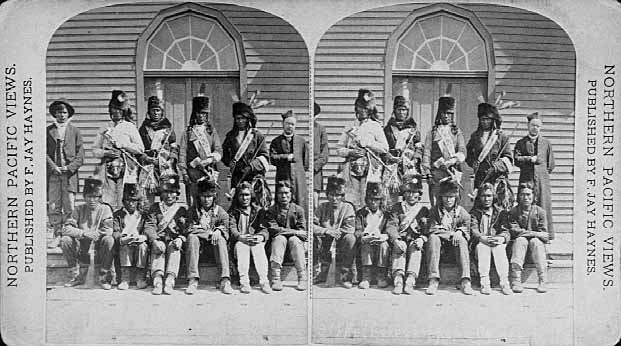
Red Lake Chiefs ca. 1890, photographed by Frank Jay Haynes

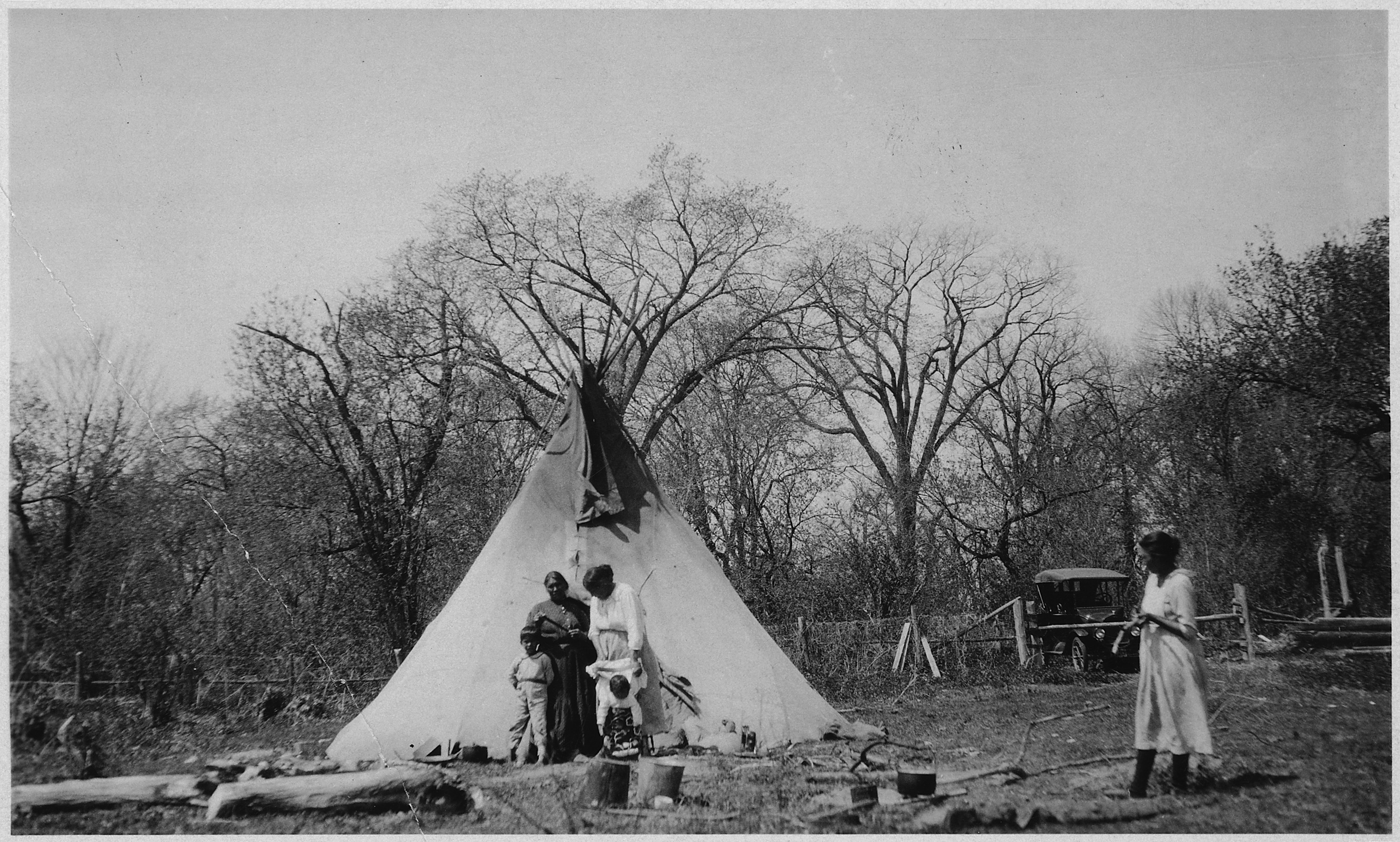
Tipi summer home of John Jones, Red Lake Agency, 1925

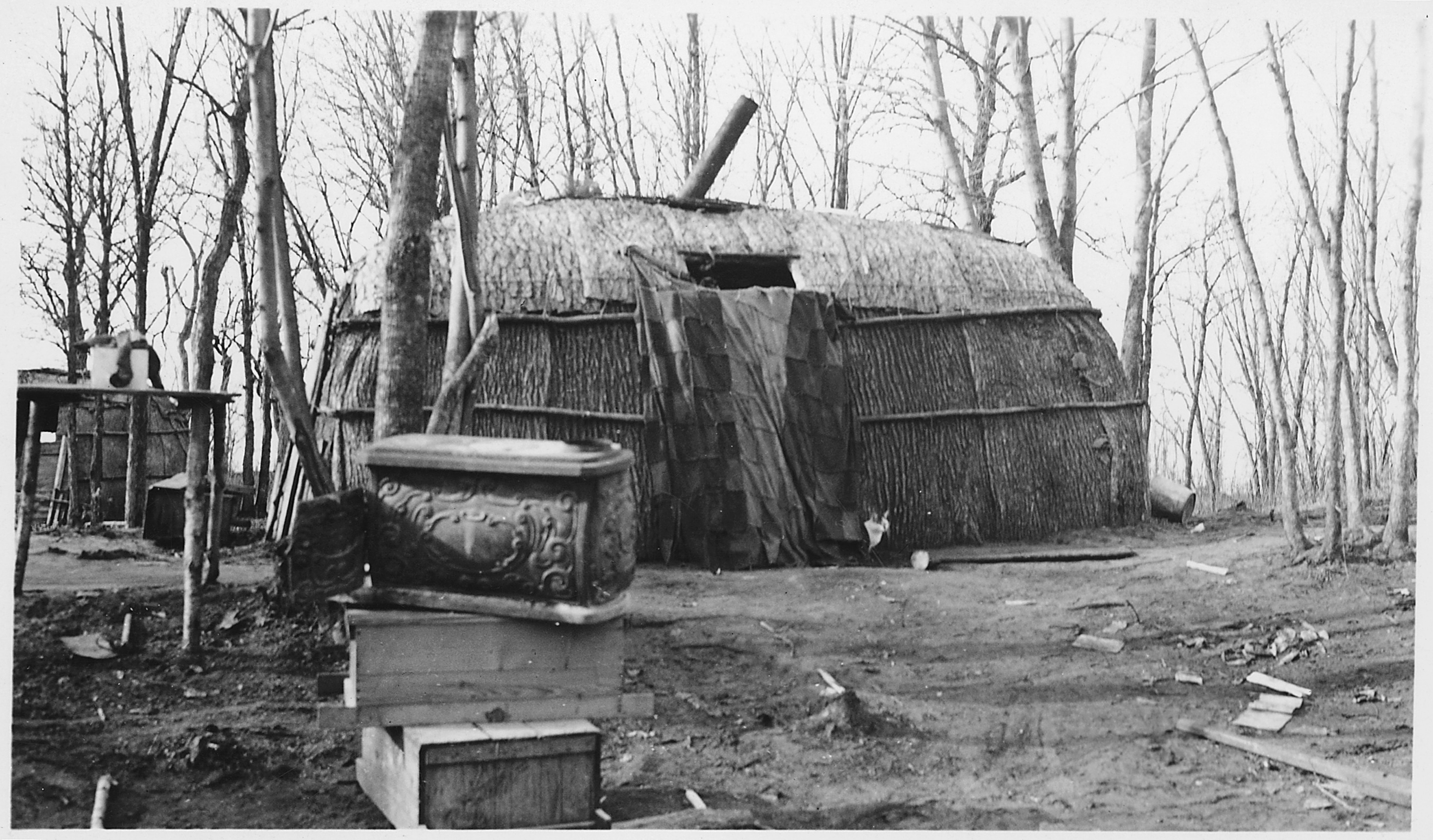
Bark wigwam (summer home), Ponemah Point, Red Lake Agency, 1934

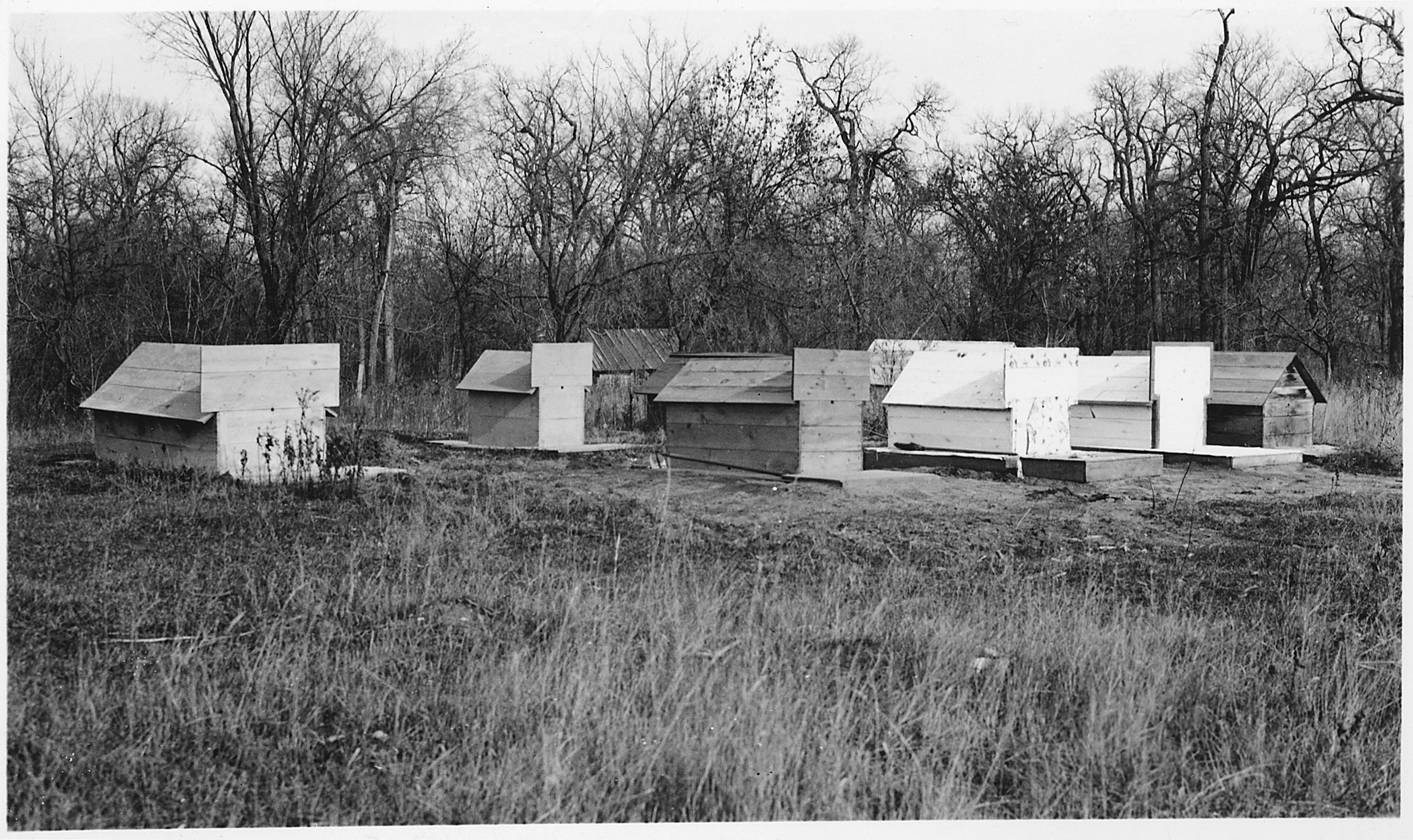
Family burial ground, Ponemah, Red Lake Agency, 1934

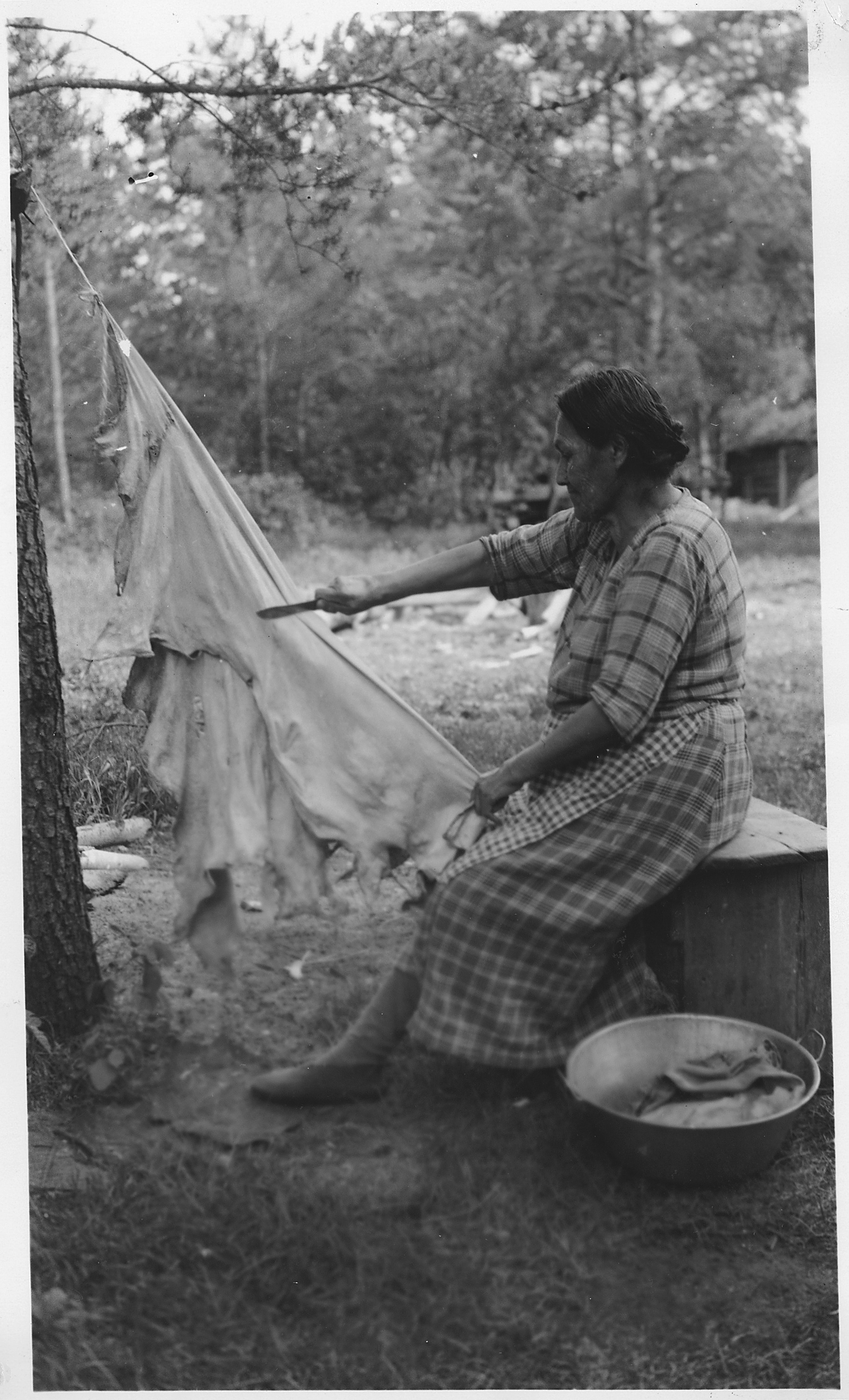
Cleaning green deer hides prior to tanning, Red Lake Agency, 1939

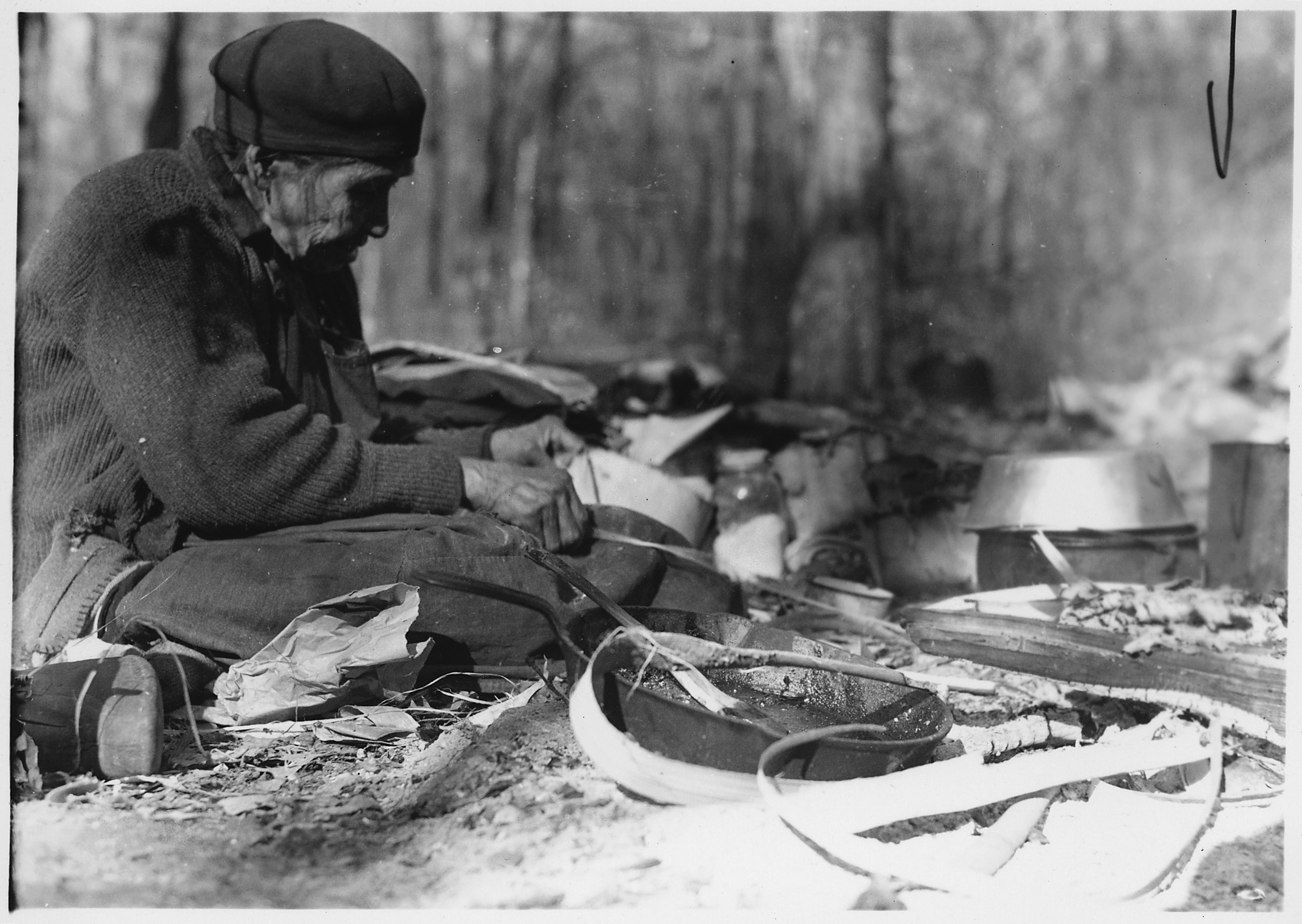
Maple sugar, Red Lake Agency, 1939

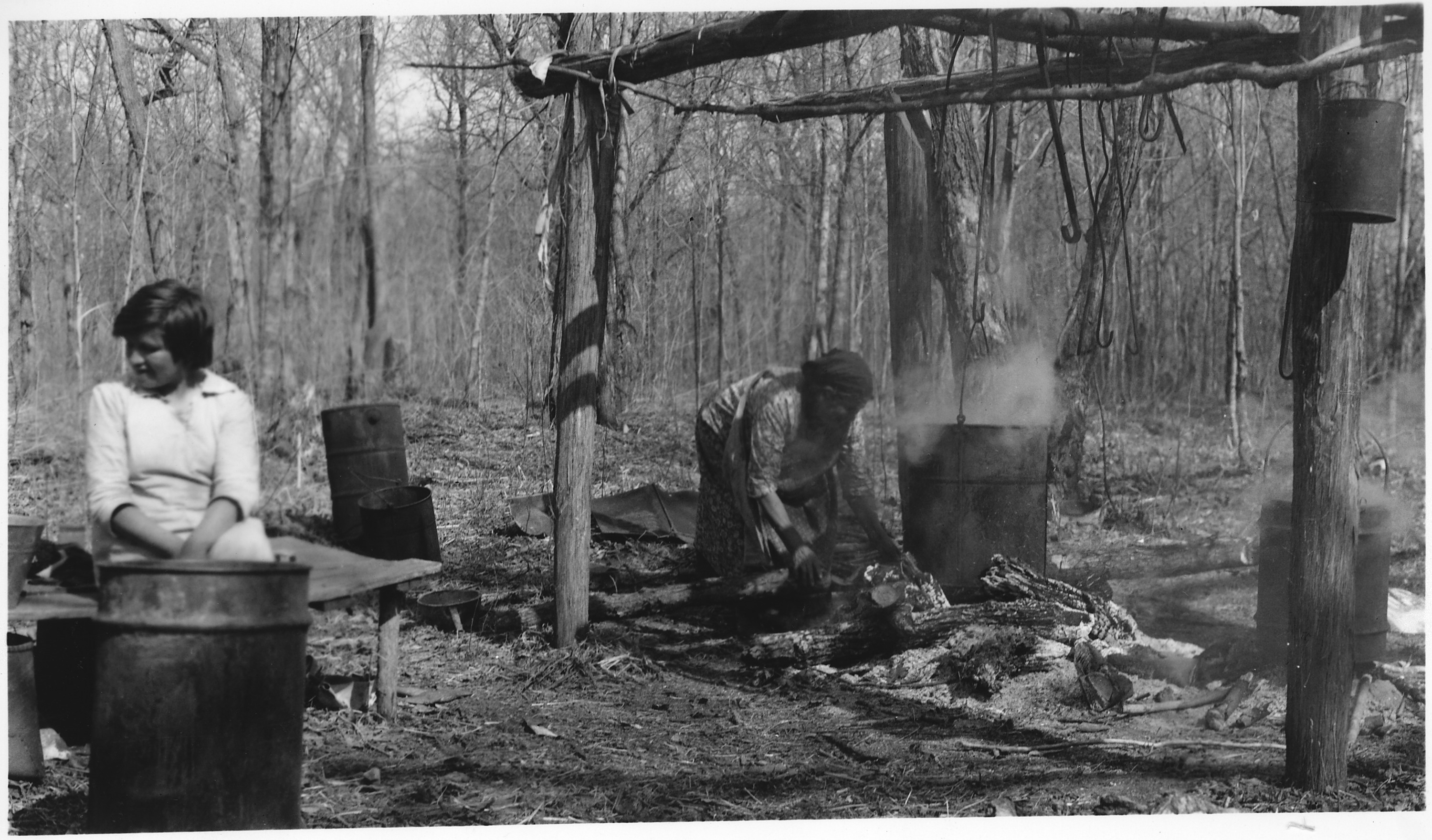
Maple sugar industry, boiling sap, Red Lake Agency, 1939

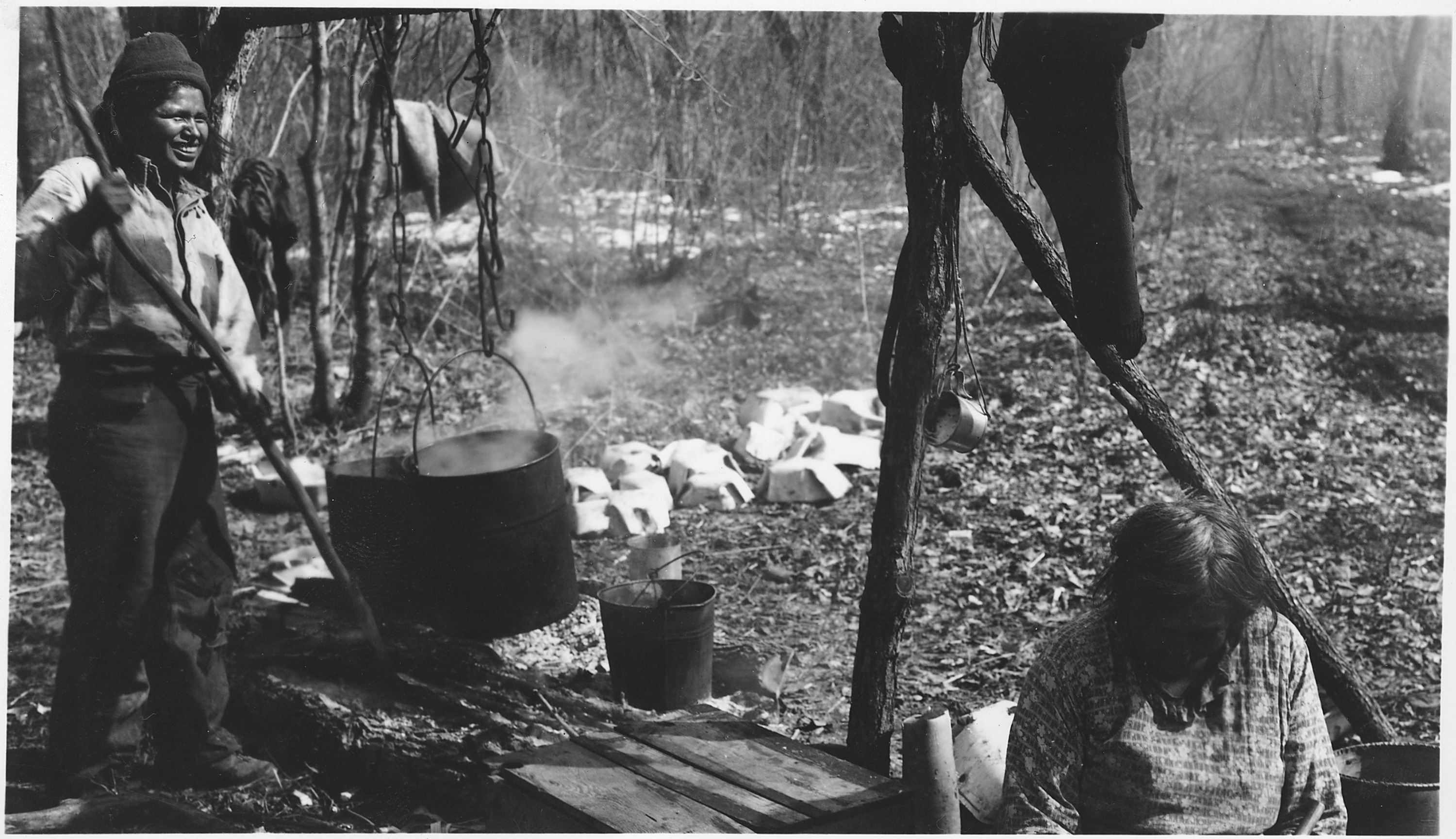
Maple sugar industry, boiling sap, Red Lake Agency, 1939

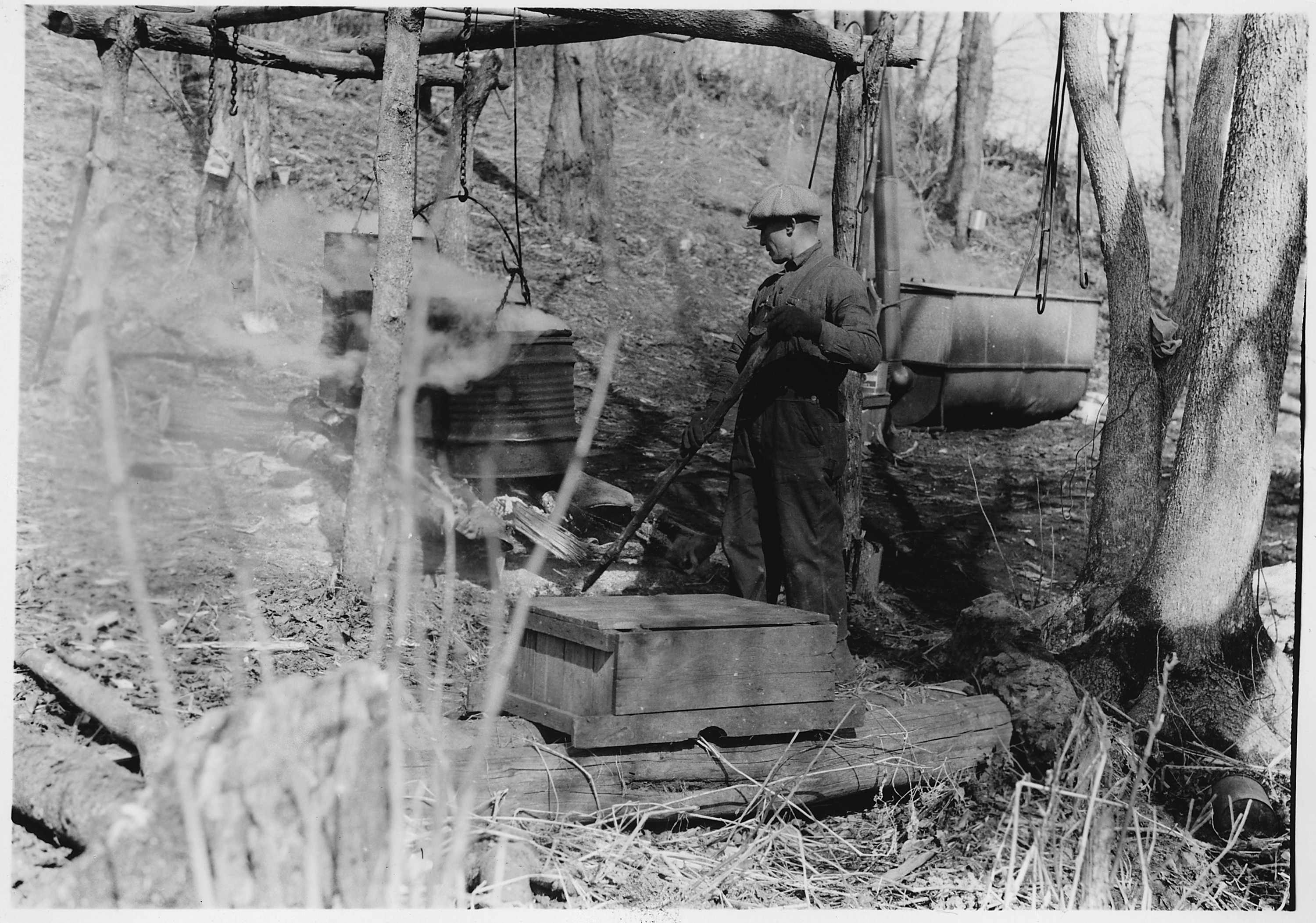
Maple sugar industry, boiling sap, Red Lake Agency, 1939

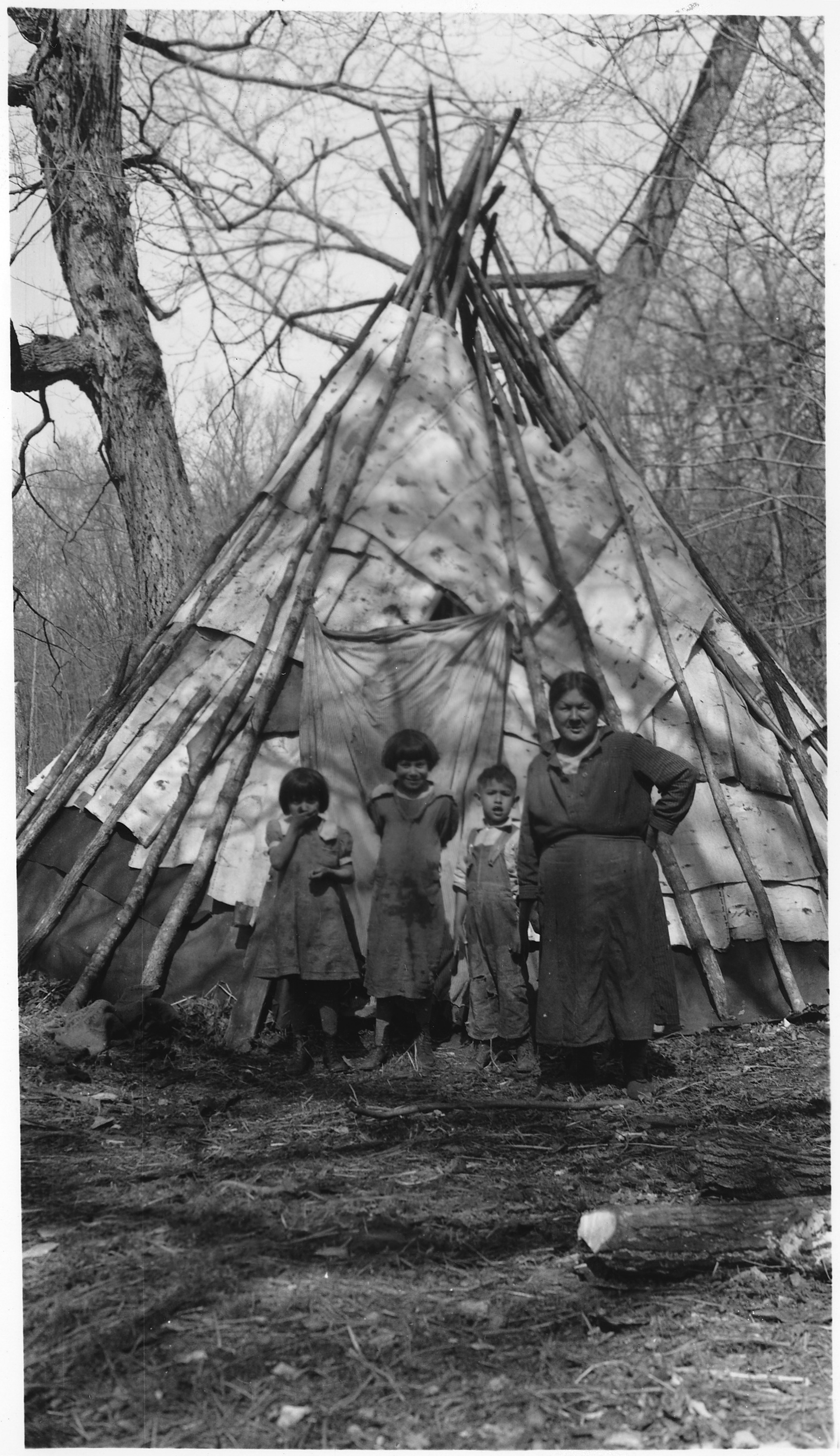
Maple sugar industry, birch bark tipi, Red Lake Agency, 1939

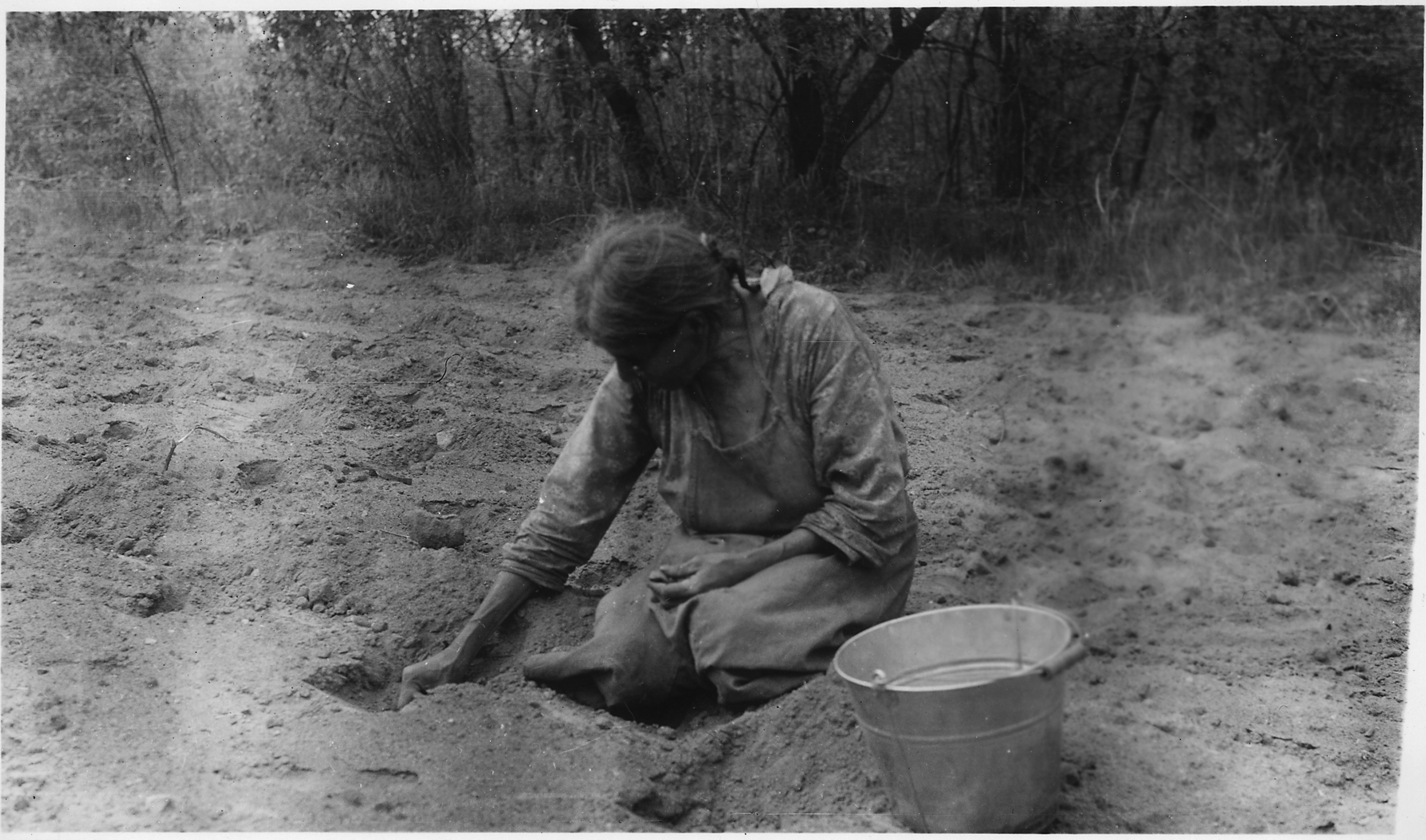
Oke-mah Wah Cumig Oke planting seed potatoes, Red Lake Agency, 1940

The Red Lake Indian Reservation (Ojibwe: Miskwaagamiiwi-zaaga'iganing) covers 1,260.3 sq mi (3,264 km^{2}; 806,600 acres) in parts of nine counties in Minnesota, United States. It is made up of numerous holdings but the largest section is an area around Red Lake, in north-central Minnesota, the largest lake in the state. This section lies primarily in the counties of Beltrami and Clearwater. Land in seven other counties is also part of the reservation. The reservation population was 5,506 in the 2020 census.

The second-largest section (49°16′N 95°03′W) is much farther north, in the Northwest Angle of Lake of the Woods County near the Canada–United States border. It has no permanent residents. Between these two largest sections are hundreds of mostly small, non-contiguous reservation exclaves in the counties of Beltrami, Clearwater, Lake of the Woods, Koochiching, Roseau, Pennington, Marshall, Red Lake, and Polk. Home to the federally recognized Red Lake Band of Chippewa, it is unique as the only fully "closed reservation" in the United States of America. In a closed reservation, all land is held in common by the tribe and there is no private property.

The tribe claims the land by right of conquest and aboriginal title; they were not reassigned to it by the United States government. The Red Lake Band of Chippewa refused to join with six other bands in organizing as the Minnesota Chippewa Tribe in the mid-1930s; at the time, its people wanted to preserve their traditional system of hereditary chiefs, rather than forming an electoral government. As of 2011, the Ojibwe language is the official language of Red Lake. Seven principal clans (doodems) found on the Red Lake Indian Reservation are makwa (bear), mikinaak (turtle), owaazisii (bullhead), nigig (otter), migizi (eagle), waabizheshi (marten), and ogiishkimanisii (kingfisher). As a population minority name (sturgeon) and adik (caribou) clans are also found.

In the 2000 census, Red Lake was the most populous reservation in the state, with 5,162 residents. The only place in Minnesota with a higher Native American population at that time was the state's largest city, Minneapolis, 250 miles to the south; it recorded 8,378 Indian residents that year. By 2007, the White Earth and Leech Lake reservations (both led by parts of the Minnesota Chippewa Tribe) had higher resident populations of enrolled Ojibwe. The reservation's largest community is Red Lake, on the south shore of Red Lake. Given the large lake in the heart of the reservation, its total land area of 883.08 square miles (2,287.2 km^{2}) covers about 70% of the reservation's surface area.

== History ==
In the 17th century, the Algonquian-speaking Ojibwe migrated into present-day Minnesota from the north around the Great Lakes. Their warriors went ahead of colonizers and were told to clear the way for the Anishinaabe families. Before invading the Mille Lacs region, Ojibwe warriors had forced their way into the region just west of what is now Duluth, Minnesota, on Lake Superior. They established a village known as Wi-yah-kwa-kit-chi-ga-ming. It was later called Fond du Lac (Bottom of the Lake) by French fur traders, the first Europeans to interact with the Ojibwe in this area. From there, Anishinaabe warriors invaded the Sandy Lake and Red Lake regions. Their conquest of the Red Lake region may have occurred between 1650 and 1750. By that time, Anishinaabe people were already living in the Grand Portage, Rainy Lake, and Pembina region of present-day northern Minnesota.

After evicting the Dakota living in the Red Lake region, the Noka (the Military and Police totem of the Anishinaabe) occupied the area. They eventually allowed other Anishinaabe totems to enter the Red Lake region to live. Most Anishinaabe immigrants to this area were from the Noka totem (or clan). They established many villages in the Red Lake region. Later, they and their Dakota allies invaded the plains of present-day North Dakota, western South Dakota, and Montana. The Western Dakota, who refused to surrender, continued to fight the Anishinaabe-Dakota alliance. With each battle and defeat, more Dakota asked for peace from the Anishinaabe. The Western Dakota who continued the conflict developed a great hatred for those Eastern Dakota who were allies of the Anishinaabe.

William Whipple Warren, the first historian of the Ojibwe people, noted their longstanding associations with the French Canadians by the mid-18th century, due both to fur trading and intermarriage among their peoples. As a result, the Ojibwe fought with the French during the Seven Years' War against the English; it was known in North America as the French and Indian War. Although the English won the war and took over "French" territory in Canada and east of the Mississippi River, the Ojibwe retained many trading and family associations with ethnic French Canadians.

=== 19th century ===
In the 1850s two Roman Catholic priests established a mission with the Red Lake band. Later, Catholic nuns from the Benedictine monastery (convent) in St. Joseph founded St. Mary's Mission at Red Lake. They organized a boarding school at the mission to serve Ojibwe girls, teaching them Christianity and English. Over time, most residents on the reservation adopted Roman Catholicism, although many also retained Ojibwe rituals and traditions, including funeral and mourning practices.

In 1862 a commission composed of U.S. Senator Wilkinson, Indian Commissioner Dole, and Indian Superintendent Thompson had been selected to make a treaty with the Red Lake Nation, prior to the Sioux uprising. Lincoln sent his private secretary Nicolay to represent him to the Chippewa/Ojibwa peoples. A newspaper reported that the Sioux had learned that a commission had been sent to treat with the Red Lake leaders. The Sioux thought that the commission was going to give their annuities to the Red Lakers and sent a war party to intervene. Both the Red Lake and Pembina bands waited at the agreed treaty location on the Red River. When the Commission failed to show the two bands raided a Red River oxcart train bound for the Fort Garry Selkirk settlement of the Hudson's Bay Company. Afterwards the Red Lakers objected to the Pembina band taking the cattle and saw to it that the cattle were returned.

Close to this time, the Sioux made a raid on Fort Abercrombie driving off the Fort's livestock and horses. Included in this were 200 annuity cattle intended for the Red Lake Chippewa. The cattle had been diverted to Abercrombie for safe keeping from a Sioux attack. However, when the Red Lakers were informed that the Sioux actions were the cause of the delay of the Treaty Commission meeting them and their cattle having been taken, they offered to defend the frontier from the Santee Sioux. In 1863 the Pembina Band of Chippewa Indians and the Red Lake Band negotiated the Treaty of Old Crossing in Minnesota with the United States. They agreed to cede their lands in the Red River and Pembina area. They made additional agreements for land cessions in the following decades, under pressure of increased numbers of European-American settlers in the area. The Reverend Bishop Henry Whipple was furious at what the treaty called for.

The United States and the British surveyed the international border to adjust previous errors. The corrected boundary included the Northwest Angle within the United States as well as its native inhabitants, the Bois Forte Band of Chippewa. As the Bois Forte lacked federal recognition from the U.S. Bureau of Indian Affairs, the Bureau consolidated the small Bois Forte Band with the Red Lake Nation administratively.

While the tribe ceded large tracts of land to the U.S., it maintained a central geographic location. It resisted U.S. attempts to gain its approval for allotment of communal land to individual households under the Dawes Act of 1887. This involved dividing communal tribal land into individual household plots for farming and private ownership. The US would declare any land remaining on the reservation after allocating 160 acres to each head of household as "surplus" and available for sale to non-Indians.

During this period, some of the Pembina band, refused relocation to either Turtle Mountain or the White Earth reservation. They located to the Red Lake Reservation because it was "untouched Indian land." It has never left tribal control and is unique for that.

On July 8, 1889, the Bureau of Indian Affairs told the Minnesota Chippewa that the Red Lake and White Earth reservations would be retained, but the others would be put up for public sale. They said that Chippewa from the other reservations would be relocated to White Earth. The Bureau told tribal leaders that members of each reservation could vote on whether to accept allotments at that reservation. Voting was limited to all qualified tribal men. The Chippewa leaders were outraged.

Red Lake leaders warned the U.S. Government of reprisals if their Reservation was violated. The members of the White Earth, Mille Lacs, and Leech Lake reservations all voted overwhelmingly to accept land allotments and allow the surplus land sold to the whites, with the tribes to receive lump sums of money from the sales. The October 5, 1898, Battle of Sugar Point was over land.

In 1889, the Red Lake Reservation covered 3,260,000 acres or 5,093 sq. mi. The Band was forced to cede 2,905,000 acres as "surplus" after allotment to households registered on the Dawes Rolls took place. That left the Reservation with over 300,000 acres surrounding most of Lower and Upper Red Lake. Learning of Chippewa unrest because of the vote, the United States later set aside large areas of forests to add back to the Red Lake Reservation. However, in 1904 US officials returned, and forced the band to cede more land from that set aside in 1889. The present Red Lake Reservation dates to the 1904 land act. There was no allotment of land at that time to individual Chippewa living on the Red Lake Reservation.

Only a small portion of the northeast corner of the White Earth Reservation remained. It was a fraction of its original size. All the other Chippewa reservations in Minnesota were closed. The lands were sold following the Nelson Act of 1889. As a result of the 1898 Rebellion on the Leech Lake Reservation, the US changed its policy returning some land to Minnesota's remaining Chippewa reservations.

=== 20th century to present ===
The current Red Lake Reservation is entirely owned and occupied by members of the Red Lake Band, making it unique among reservations in Minnesota. As a result of allotment and sales in the intervening years, some tribes own less than 10% of the land within their reservation boundaries. Red Lake is among the most isolated reservations in the United States. In 1934, after the Indian Reorganization Act that year encouraged tribes to restore their governments, the tribe rejected joining six other Chippewa bands to organize the federally recognized Minnesota Chippewa Tribe under a written constitution. Its leaders did not want to give up the tradition of hereditary chiefs for an elected government or give up any control of its land to the tribe. By 2007, the Minnesota Chippewa Tribe reported a total enrollment of more than 40,000 members.

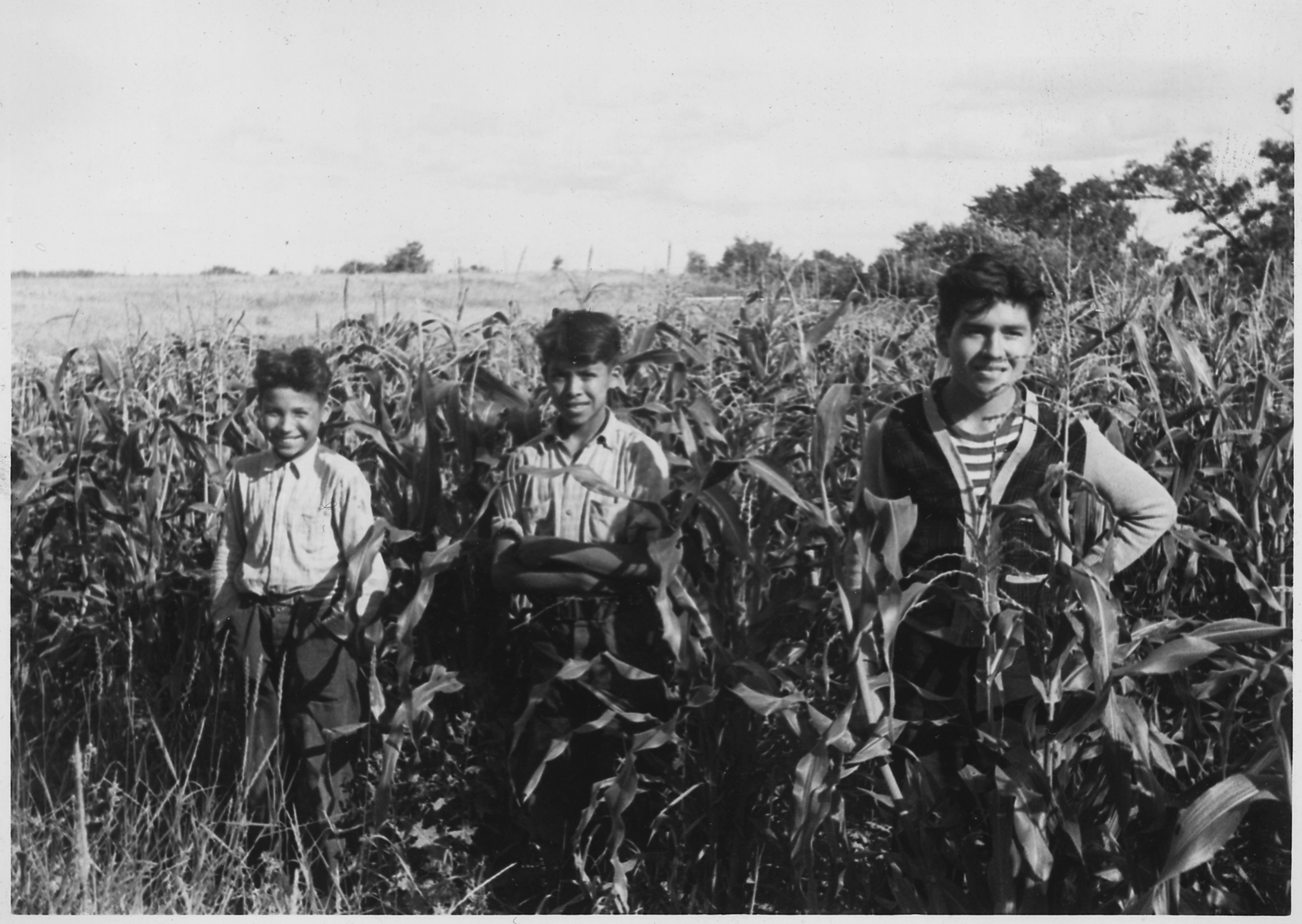
Children standing in a cornfield on the reservation in 1938

In the 1950s, new tribal leaders of Red Lake wrote a constitution to establish democratically elected government of chairman and council, without term limits. The tribe elected its first chairman and tribal council in 1959. Roger Jourdain was repeatedly re-elected and retained power until 1990. Under his leadership, the tribe developed infrastructure on the reservation, including running water, roads, and housing.

The tribe has established a library and archives, and appointed a tribal archeologist to study and preserve the archeological artifacts of its people. Tribal schools on the reservation were established so that the children could be educated in their own community through high school.

Red Lake, like the White Earth, and Leech Lake reservations, is known for its tradition of singing hymns in the Ojibwe language.

In part because of the reservation's isolation, it has struggled economically. Many people are unemployed. High unemployment has contributed to high rates of poverty, alcoholism, violence and suicide. As a result, since the 1990s, the school board has added classes to the high school curriculum to include drug and alcohol abuse prevention, anti-gang training, anti-bullying training, and instruction about fetal alcohol syndrome. As a result of gang killings in the 1990s, the school added security measures to the high school, including guards.

The Red Lake Band of the Chippewa are the only entity beside state governments and Pacific dependencies currently eligible for SAMHSA Substance Abuse Prevention and Treatment block grants

Since the mid-20th century, the tribe has asserted a significant level of sovereignty. Due to its status as a "closed reservation", the tribe can assert a considerable amount of control over non-residents, including controlling their movements within the reservation or expelling them altogether. As an example, the tribe has barred journalists from entry on several occasions. The prosecution of crimes is often complex due to issues of jurisdiction, which often have to be clarified on a case-by-case basis. The reservation tribal police have jurisdiction over misdemeanors, but the US government, the Bureau of Indian Affairs (BIA) police, legally has jurisdiction over felonies. The state of Minnesota has no criminal jurisdiction over the reservation.

Political tensions have sometimes erupted into violence. In 1979, during a struggle over leadership, men with rifles attacked the tribal police station, and two teenagers were killed. One shot himself accidentally and the other was accidentally shot while struggling with a companion over control of a weapon. Men burned several buildings, including the home of the tribal chairman. The tribe and reservation was the first in the United States to issue its own vehicle license plates as a measure of its sovereign status. It is struggling to find ways to develop its economy. It is collaborating in the 21st century with the White Earth and Leech Lake bands to reach out to the business and academic communities to promote job development. (See "Economy" below.)

The Red Lake shootings occurred on March 21, 2005, in two locations on the reservation.

== Demographics ==
=== Population ===
According to the 2020 census, the Red Lake Reservation was home to 5,506 individuals. The population density stood at 6.2 inhabitants per square mile (2.4/km^{2}), with 1,591 housing units spread at an average density of 1.8 per square mile (0.7/km^{2}). The community's ethnic composition was 5,302 (96.29%) Native American, 39 (0.71%) White, 2 (0.04%) belonging to other racial groups, and 1.1% multiracial. Additionally, 1.8% of the population identified as Hispanic. The demographic profile shows over 40% of the population being under 18 years of age.

=== Economic and health metrics ===
The Red Lake Reservation has the lowest per capita income among all reservations in the state, recorded at US$8,372 in 1999 according to the Northwest Area Foundation. Around 40% of the community lives beneath the poverty line. The period between 1990 and 2000 saw a 40% population increase as individuals returned to the reservation, driven by employment challenges elsewhere during economic recessions.

The reservation faces a near 60% unemployment rate, closely linked to prevalent poverty, which is believed to exacerbate the crime rate. In 2004, tribal police reported 3,500 court cases.

This high unemployment and poverty level have led to significant issues, including elevated violence rates and suicide. A 2004 study by Minnesota School revealed alarming statistics: 43% of freshman boys and 81% of freshman girls had contemplated suicide, with 48% of the girls having attempted it. Furthermore, the high school faces challenges in maintaining graduation rates.

== Geography ==
Red Lake Reservation has some widely scattered properties in northwest Minnesota. Most of the Reservation is located around Lower and Upper Red Lake, which is one of the largest lakes in the United States. The land area of the Reservation is located mainly around Lower Red Lake and west of that and Upper Red Lake. The land is covered by prime forest. In 1945 70% of the Northwest Angle in Minnesota was put into trust for the Red Lake Chippewa.

According to the United States Census Bureau in 2020, the reservation has a total area of 1,260.32 square miles (3,264.2 km^{2}), of which 883.09 square miles (2,287.2 km^{2}) is land and 377.23 square miles (977.0 km^{2}) is water.

Elevation across the Red Lake Reservation ranges in elevation from 1,100 feet above sea level to 1,300 feet above sea level. Besides Lower and Upper Red Lakes, many smaller lakes are scattered across the reservation, especially south of Lower Red Lake.

=== Communities ===
Communities on the Red Lake Reservation:

- Little Rock
- Ponemah
- Red Lake
- Redby

=== Climate ===
Red Lake Reservation has extreme climate conditions. Winters are long and cold, while summers are short and warm. During the winter months of December, January, and February, the average low temperatures at Red Lake are 0, -8, and -3 °F. Average high temperatures for the same winter months at Red Lake are 19, 13, and 20 °F. Average high temperatures for the summer months of June, July, and August at Red Lake are 73, 78, and 76 °F. Average low temperatures for the same summer months at Red Lake are 51, 57, and 54 °F.

The lake and forest contribute to significant precipitation at Red Lake, 23 inches (58 cm) annually. The large lake has a warming effect, especially in low temperatures. The mild summer low temperatures are a result of the warming effect of Lower and Upper Red Lake. Low temperatures during the summer further south, are cooler, especially at communities that are not located next to lakes.

Climate data for Red Lake Indian Reservation (1991–2020 normals, extremes 1943–present)
Month	Jan	Feb	Mar	Apr	May	Jun	Jul	Aug	Sep	Oct	Nov	Dec	Year
Record high °F (°C)	51 (11)	62 (17)	78 (26)	95 (35)	95 (35)	100 (38)	101 (38)	100 (38)	95 (35)	93 (34)	76 (24)	58 (14)	101 (38)
Mean daily maximum °F (°C)	16.0 (−8.9)	20.9 (−6.2)	34.0 (1.1)	47.9 (8.8)	62.3 (16.8)	71.9 (22.2)	76.6 (24.8)	75.6 (24.2)	65.8 (18.8)	51.3 (10.7)	34.4 (1.3)	21.4 (−5.9)	48.2 (9.0)
Daily mean °F (°C)	6.6 (−14.1)	10.8 (−11.8)	24.4 (−4.2)	38.5 (3.6)	52.7 (11.5)	63.1 (17.3)	68.1 (20.1)	66.5 (19.2)	56.9 (13.8)	43.4 (6.3)	27.5 (−2.5)	13.6 (−10.2)	39.3 (4.1)
Mean daily minimum °F (°C)	−2.7 (−19.3)	0.7 (−17.4)	14.8 (−9.6)	29.1 (−1.6)	43.1 (6.2)	54.4 (12.4)	59.7 (15.4)	57.4 (14.1)	48.0 (8.9)	35.6 (2.0)	20.6 (−6.3)	5.9 (−14.5)	30.6 (−0.8)
Record low °F (°C)	−48 (−44)	−44 (−42)	−32 (−36)	−17 (−27)	6 (−14)	27 (−3)	27 (−3)	31 (−1)	11 (−12)	−3 (−19)	−23 (−31)	−39 (−39)	−48 (−44)
Average precipitation inches (mm)	1.03 (26)	0.55 (14)	0.81 (21)	1.28 (33)	2.91 (74)	3.61 (92)	3.51 (89)	2.78 (71)	2.50 (64)	2.34 (59)	1.05 (27)	0.40 (10)	22.77 (578)
Average precipitation days (≥ 0.01 in)	3.4	2.3	3.0	5.5	9.2	10.0	9.9	7.7	8.6	8.1	4.4	3.1	75.2
Source: NOAA

== Economy ==
The tribe operates three casinos: Seven Clans Casino Red Lake in Red Lake, Seven Clans Casino Thief River Falls near Thief River Falls, and Seven Clans Casino Warroad (formerly called the Lake of the Woods Bingo and Casino) in Warroad. The three casinos combined are known as Seven Clans Casinos.

Industry on the reservation has consisted primarily of sustainable logging and commercial fishing of walleye ogaawag in the lakes.

The Red Lake Nation Department of Natural Resources has been instrumental in reviving walleye populations. Walleye production dropped significantly in the 1990s, adding to the reservation's financial problems; a joint effort by Minnesota Department of Natural Resources, the Bureau of Indian Affairs and the Red Lake Band to create a sustainable walleye fishery resulted in a seven-year closure of Red Lake to harvest that ended in 2006 and was followed by stricter regulation. The tribe operates the Akina Red Lake Fishery, a fish-packing plant in Redby, Minnesota.

Northern Minnesota tribes are working together to stimulate economic development in the region. The Red Lake, Leech Lake, and White Earth nations created the Northern Minnesota Tribal Economic Development Commission. They are seeking to make more connections with area businesses and resources. In 2008 the three tribes organized the Northern Minnesota Reservation Economic Development Summit and Trade Show. The White Earth Band is the largest of the six who belong to the Minnesota Chippewa Tribe, to which the Leech Lake Band also belongs.

An economic project with health and cultural benefits, in 2018 the Red Lake Band introduced a bison herd to the reservation with guidance from Kade Ferris (Turtle Mountain Chippewa/Métis), the Red Lake Band's tribal archaeologist. The herd provides meat to tribal citizens, and it and the nearby garden are part of the Red Lake Nation's Food Initiative.

== Government ==
In 1934, Red Lake rejected organization under the Indian Reorganization Act, as it preferred to retain a clan-based system of governance. The Band did not join the Minnesota Chippewa Tribe, a federally recognized conglomeration of Minnesota's other Chippewa nations, which has its own governing authority.

During the 1950s, governmental reform efforts in Red Lake resulted in the drafting of a tribal constitution. The constitution established an elected Tribal Council; a group of seven traditionally selected tribal leaders was established to serve on an advisory basis. Together with the elected council members, these traditional leaders form the Tribal Council's subordinate committees.

In 1959, Roger Jourdain was elected as Red Lake's first chairman; he was successively re-elected until 1990. Jourdain is credited with working to affirm the tribe's sovereignty through negotiations with the state and federal governments, which resulted in Red Lake's continued exemption from Public Law 280.

Jourdain's administration also oversaw the reopening of an Indian Health Service hospital and extensive infrastructure improvements, which focused on running water, housing development, and roads. Jourdain's administration also attracted controversy; in 1979, a two-day riot occurred on the reservation following the Tribal Council's dismissal of its secretary-treasurer. During the riots, armed protestors attacked the tribal police station and burned fourteen buildings, including Jourdain's home. Two teenagers were killed; one during a struggle over a weapon and the other due to an accidental, self-inflicted wound.

In 1990, Gerald "Butch" Brun unseated Jourdain. Darrell G. Seki Sr. is the current tribal chairman as of 2022.

Between 2015 and 2020, the Red Lake Nation participated in the Tiwahe Demonstration Project, a pilot for a federal program that provides funding for tribal governments to enhance their self-governance and integrate public services. Red Lake Nation used this funding in part to hire a Healing to Wellness Court (HTWC) judge and to improve its family drug courts, which seek to provide alternatives to incarceration and reduce recidivism.

In 2021, the Red Lake Nation received authorization from the U.S. Environmental Protection Agency to exercise authority over the water quality standards for its tribal surface water.

== Education ==
School systems include:

- Red Lake School District
  - Red Lake Senior High School
- Endazhi-Nitaawiging Charter School

== Notable tribal members and residents ==
- Donna Bergstrom, retired US Marine Corps officer, ran for the Minnesota Senate in 2016, candidate for Minnesota lieutenant governor in the Republican primary of 2018
- Brenda Child, educator and author, history professor, University of Minnesota; author of Boarding School Seasons (2000) and Holding Our World Together: Ojibwe Women and the Survival of the Community (2012)
- Patrick DesJarlait, Red Lake Ojibwe visual artist and graphic designer
- Sam English, artist, painter, and activist for various causes, including those of Native American chemical dependency, health, and wellness organizations
- Adam Fortunate Eagle, Native American political activist
- Roger Jourdain (1913–2002), elected the first chairman of the Red Lake Band of Chippewa in 1959, in the tribe's first popular election of leader; served until 1990; was selected in 1986 as the Indian Man of the Year by the American Indian Heritage Foundation
- Bill Lawrence (1939–2010), owner-editor of Native American Press/Ojibwe News since 1988
- Medweganoonind, 19th-century Red Lake Ojibwe chief
- Charlie Norris, professional wrestler
- Migizi Pensoneau, television writer
- Gary Sargent (b. 1954), ice hockey player
- William Whipple Warren, Minnesota territorial legislator (1851–1853) and first Ojibwe historian; wrote a work combining oral history and recognized European-American criteria; his History of the Ojibway People, Based Upon Traditions and Oral Statements (1885), was published posthumously
- Andy Wells, engineer, inventor, founder and CEO of Wells Technology and founder of Wells Academy, which gives indigenous people a second chance with training in manufacturing
