= List of casinos in Minnesota =

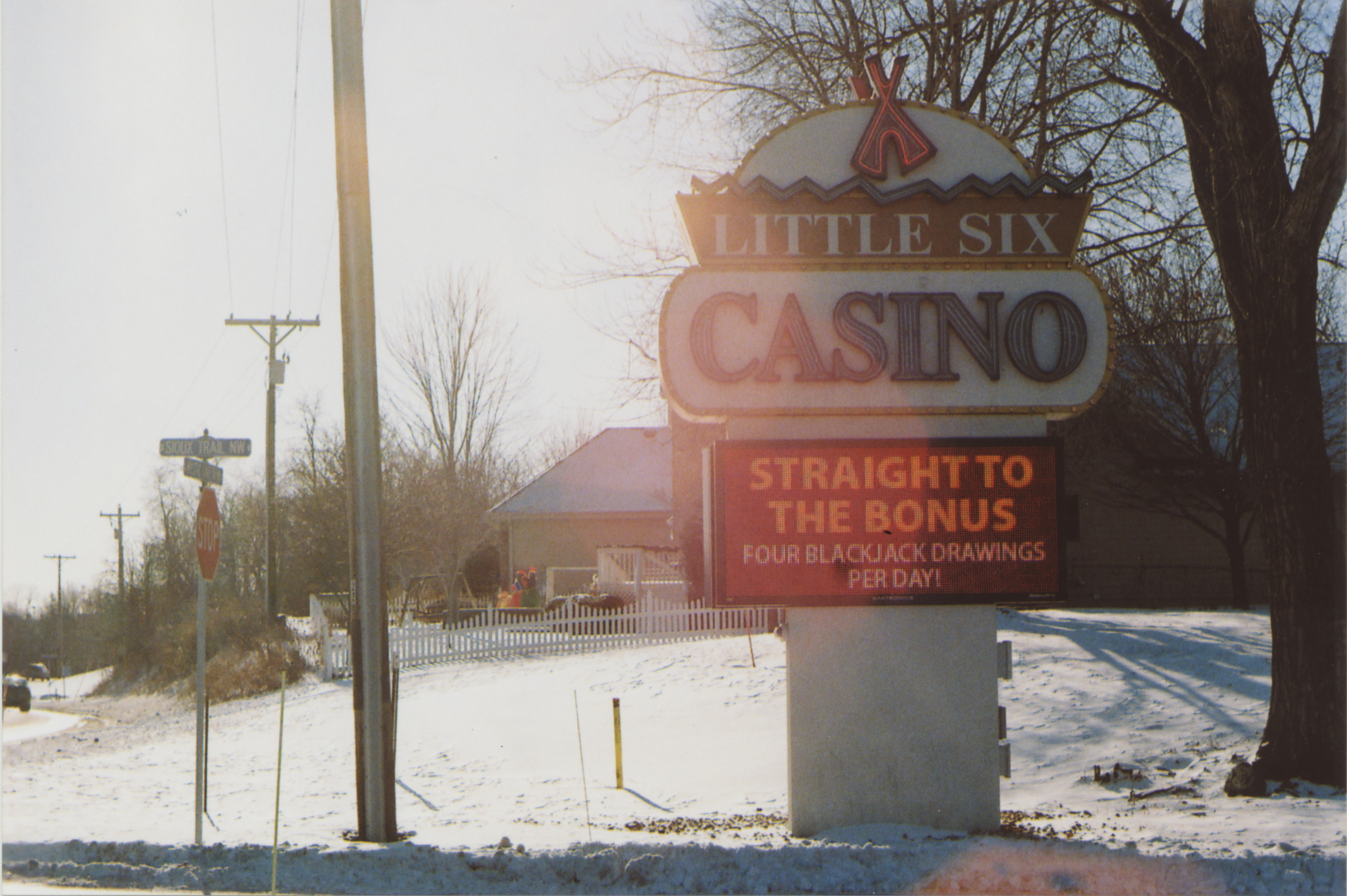
LittleSix

This is a list of casinos in Minnesota.

== List of casinos ==
List of casinos in the U.S. state of Minnesota
Casino	City	County	State	District	Type	Comments
Black Bear Casino Resort	Carlton	Carlton	Minnesota		Native American	Owned by the Fond du Lac Band of Lake Superior Chippewa
Canterbury Park	Shakopee	Scott	Minnesota		Racino	Thoroughbred race track
Fond-du-Luth Casino	Duluth	St. Louis	Minnesota		Native American	Owned by the Fond du Lac Band of Lake Superior Chippewa
Fortune Bay Resort Casino	Tower	St. Louis	Minnesota		Native American	Owned by the Bois Forte Band of Chippewa
Grand Casino Hinckley	Hinckley	Pine	Minnesota		Native American	Owned by the Mille Lacs Band of Ojibwe
Grand Casino Mille Lacs	Onamia	Mille Lacs	Minnesota		Native American	Owned by the Mille Lacs Band of Ojibwe
Grand Portage Lodge & Casino	Grand Portage	Cook	Minnesota		Native American	Owned by the Grand Portage Band of Lake Superior Chippewa
Jackpot Junction Casino Hotel	Morton	Redwood	Minnesota		Native American	Owned by the Lower Sioux Indian Community
Little Six Casino	Prior Lake	Scott	Minnesota		Native American	Owned by the Shakopee Mdewakanton Sioux Community
Mystic Lake Casino Hotel	Prior Lake	Scott	Minnesota		Native American	Owned by the Shakopee Mdewakanton Sioux Community
Northern Lights Casino & Hotel	Walker	Cass	Minnesota		Native American	Owned by the Leech Lake Band of Ojibwe
Cedar Lakes Casino	Cass Lake	Cass	Minnesota		Native American	Owned by the Leech Lake Band of Ojibwe
Prairie's Edge Casino Resort	Granite Falls	Yellow Medicine	Minnesota		Native American	Owned by the Upper Sioux Community
Running Aces Casino & Racetrack	Columbus	Anoka	Minnesota		Racino	Thoroughbred race track
Seven Clans Casino Red Lake	Red Lake	Beltrami	Minnesota		Native American	Owned by the Red Lake Band of Chippewa
Seven Clans Casino Thief River Falls	Thief River Falls	Pennington	Minnesota		Native American	Owned by the Red Lake Band of Chippewa
Seven Clans Casino Warroad	Warroad	Roseau	Minnesota		Native American	Owned by the Red Lake Band of Chippewa
Shooting Star Casino	Mahnomen	Mahnomen	Minnesota		Native American	Owned by the White Earth Nation
Treasure Island Resort & Casino	Red Wing	Goodhue	Minnesota		Native American	Owned by the Prairie Island Indian Community
White Oak Casino	Deer River	Itasca	Minnesota		Native American	Owned by the Leech Lake Band of Ojibwe

== See also ==
- List of casinos in the United States
- List of casino hotels
