= Lower Red Lake, Minnesota =

Unorganized territory of Beltrami County, Minnesota, US

Coordinates: 47°55′09″N 94°59′27″W

- Unorganized territory
- Location of Lower Red Lake, within Beltrami County, Minnesota
- Country: United States
- State: Minnesota
- County: Beltrami

Area
  - Total: 419.29 sq mi (1,086.0 km^{2})
  - Land: 140.84 sq mi (364.8 km^{2})
  - Water: 278.44 sq mi (721.2 km^{2})

Population (2020)
  - Total: 5,416
  - Density: 38.45/sq mi (14.85/km^{2})
- Time zone: UTC-6 (Central (CST))
  - Summer (DST): UTC-5 (CDT)
- Area code: 218

Lower Red Lake is an unorganized territory in Beltrami County, Minnesota, United States.The territory is located on the Red Lake Indian Reservation, and the town of Red Lake is located in the area. The population of the Lower Red Lake territory was 5,416 at the 2020 census.

== Communities ==
The United States Census Bureau has identified four communities within the territory as census-designated places (CDPs). These settlements are not incorporated, and the area and population statistics for each CDP are also included in the aggregate values reported for the territory. The CDPs are:

- Little Rock
- Ponemah
- Red Lake
- Redby

== Geography ==
According to the U.S. Census, the unorganized territory has a total area of 419.4 square miles (1,086.3 km^{2}), of which 140.8 square miles (364.7 km^{2}) is land and 278.6 square miles (721.6 km^{2}), or 66.43%, is water.

== Demographics ==
Historical population
| Census | Pop. | Note | %± |
|---|---|---|---|
| 1970 | 2,675 | | — |
| 1980 | 2,855 | | 6.7% |
| 1990 | 3,621 | | 26.8% |
| 2000 | 5,057 | | 39.7% |
| 2010 | 5,790 | | 14.5% |
| 2020 | 5,416 | | −6.5% |
U.S. Decennial Census

As of the census of 2000, there were 5,057 people, 1,323 households, and 1,088 families residing in the unorganized territory. The population density was 35.8 inhabitants per square mile (13.8/km^{2}). There were 1,378 housing units at an average density of 9.8 per square mile (3.8/km^{2}). The racial makeup of the unorganized territory was 1.09% White, 0.10% Black or African American, 98.36% Native American, 0.04% Asian, 0.06% from other races, and 0.36% from two or more races. Hispanic or Latino of any race were 1.64% of the population.

There were 1,323 households, out of which 52.8% had children under the age of 18 living with them, 25.7% were married couples living together, 40.7% had a female householder with no husband present, and 17.7% were non-families. 14.8% of all households were made up of individuals, and 3.9% had someone living alone who was 65 years of age or older. The average household size was 3.79 and the average family size was 4.02.

In the unorganized territory the population was spread out, with 46.3% under the age of 18, 11.4% from 18 to 24, 24.7% from 25 to 44, 13.3% from 45 to 64, and 4.3% who were 65 years of age or older. The median age was 20 years. For every 100 females, there were 94.7 males. For every 100 females age 18 and over, there were 89.9 males.

The median income for a household in the unorganized territory was $22,543, and the median income for a family was $19,703. Males had a median income of $24,083 versus $23,299 for females. The per capita income for the unorganized territory was $7,915. About 39.3% of families and 40.2% of the population were below the poverty line, including 46.9% of those under age 18 and 32.3% of those age 65 or over.
