= 2005 Red Lake shootings =

School shooting in Red Lake, Minnesota, US

- Red Lake (Minnesota) Red Lake (the United States)
- Location: 48°09′18″N 95°06′08″W; Red Lake, Minnesota, U.S.
- Date: March 21, 2005; 21 years ago 2:47 – 2:58 p.m. (CST; UTC−06:00)
- Target: Grandparents; students and staff at Red Lake Senior High School
- Attack type: Mass shooting; school shooting; mass murder; murder–suicide; spree shooting; shootout; parricide
- Weapons: .40 caliber Glock 22 semi-automatic pistol; .22 caliber Ruger MK II semi-automatic pistol; 12-gauge Remington 870 Police Magnum pump-action shotgun
- Deaths: 10 (including the perpetrator)
- Injuries: 9 (7 by gunfire)
- Perpetrator: Jeffrey James "Jeff" Weise
- Defenders: Derrick Brun; Jeffrey May
- Motive: Unknown

On March 21, 2005, a shooting spree occurred at two locations in the Red Lake Indian Reservation in Red Lake, Minnesota, United States. That afternoon, 16-year-old Jeff Weise killed his grandfather (an Ojibwe Red Lake police sergeant) and his grandfather's girlfriend at home. After taking his grandfather's police weapons and bulletproof vest, Weise drove his grandfather's police car to Red Lake Senior High School, where he was enrolled. Weise shot and killed seven people at the school and wounded nine others. The dead included an unarmed security guard at the entrance of the school, a teacher, and five students. After the police arrived, Weise exchanged gunfire with them. After being wounded, he committed suicide inside of a classroom. It remains the deadliest mass shooting in Minnesota.

== Background ==
The reservation of the Red Lake Band of Ojibwe is in northwest Minnesota and is one of two nationally that are "closed", i.e. only Ojibwe tribal members may live and own land there. Its residents suffer high rates of unemployment, violence, and suicide. Housing is poor, and many students do not finish high school. Work opportunities are limited on the reservation, which has a population of more than 5,000, and the unemployment rate was around 60 percent at the time of the shooting. A study in 2004 found that a high proportion of students in high school had thought of suicide. Half of the class of 2004 did not graduate from Red Lake Senior High School; Weise was enrolled in the school’s homebound program, which let students in the program complete schoolwork at home. The program was created to help at-risk students graduate. The nearest grocery stores are 32 miles (51 km) away from Red Lake in Bemidji.

== Shootings ==
=== Lakeside Home shooting ===
On the day of the shootings, at 2:47 p.m., Weise retrieved a .22 caliber Ruger MKII pistol from his bedroom and fatally shot his grandfather, Daryl Lussier Sr., as he was sleeping; he shot him two times in the head and ten times in the chest. According to Weise's friends, he may have had the gun for as long as a year. He took Lussier's police gear, a .40 caliber Glock 22 pistol, a 12 gauge Remington 870 pump-action shotgun, a gun belt and a bulletproof vest. Weise then fatally shot Michelle Sigana, his grandfather's girlfriend, two times in the head as she carried laundry up the stairs. Weise also intended to take a AR-15 style rifle but he found it to be jammed. Police later said that if the rifle had been used, the death toll could have been much higher.

=== Red Lake High School shooting ===
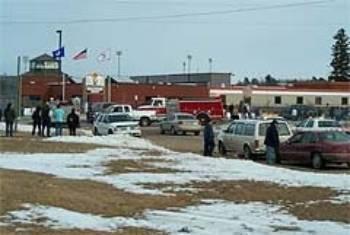
Fire department response at Red Lake Senior High School

Weise then drove his grandfather's squad car to Red Lake Senior High School where he arrived two minutes later at 2:49 p.m. and rammed the vehicle into the school building. As he entered the school through the main entrance, he encountered two unarmed security guards manning a metal detector. Weise shot and killed security guard Derrick Brun with the shotgun, while the other security guard, Leann Grant, escaped without injury, warning students and teachers to take cover. Weise proceeded into the main corridor of the school and wounded English teacher Neva Rogers who was pushing a computer cart and conversing with students in the hallway. The students scattered and Rogers ran to knock on Missy Dodd's classroom door. She was let in and initiated lockdown procedures, turning off lights, locking the door, and ushering the students under the tables.

Not long after Neva Rogers entered Missy Dodd's room, at 2:51 p.m., Weise shot out the glass panel next to the classroom door, reached his arm through, unlocked the door, and stepped into Dodd's study hall. There were fifteen students and three adults in the room. Neva Rogers began to pray, crying "God be with us!" Weise shot her once in the head using the Glock handgun, killing her instantly.

Weise then told students, "If any of you believe in God, now would be a good time to call in a favor." Weise approached a group of students, asking, "Do you guys believe in God?" One student, Chon'gai'la Morris replied no, and Weise passed over him. The rest of the group remained silent, and as a result were shot at. Weise then turned and asked other students the same question; those who replied in the affirmative or hesitated to answer were wounded or killed, while those who denied believing in God were left uninjured.

Jeffrey May, a 16-year-old sophomore, tried to wrestle Weise inside the classroom and stabbed him in the stomach with a pencil. May's diversion allowed students to flee the classroom to safety, but Weise shot him two times in the neck and once in the jaw, leaving him seriously injured. Weise left Dodd's room a few minutes later to search for more targets. Three students and one teacher were killed in the class and five more students had been hurt. Weise wandered through the halls and managed to force his way into another classroom, where he wounded two more students. A girl hiding inside this classroom heard the shooter ask, "Do you believe in God?" This time, he did not wait for answers and fired immediately and indiscriminately after posing the question.

Witnesses said Weise smiled as he was shooting at people. Several survivors claimed that he asked students if they believed in God, shooting them if they answered yes or hesitated to answer. This is believed to have been a reference to a widely publicized exchange between Dylan Klebold and Valeen Schnurr during Columbine high school massacre. Weise had also used the screen name "do you believe in god" on several internet accounts. Ryan Auginash was wounded when he affirmed his faith in Christianity. Lance Crowe was also wounded for refusing to answer.

At around 2:54 p.m., Weise returned to the main entrance, where he wounded two students. Tribal police arrived quickly and engaged him in gunfire. FBI Special Agent Paul McCabe said the shootout lasted for about four minutes. None of the police officers were injured. After being hit three times in the lower back, right leg, and right arm by police gunfire, Weise retreated to Miss Dodd's classroom again, yelling "I have hostages!" Weise shot and killed two more students who were hiding under tables, before leaning against a wall, putting the shotgun barrel to his chin, and firing, instantly killing himself at 2:58 p.m.

The shootings lasted nine minutes. Weise fired a total of 59 shots during the shooting spree: 14 at his grandfather's home and 45 at the school. He fired 37 rounds from his grandfather's Glock handgun, 14 from his Ruger handgun, and eight from the shotgun.

=== Victims ===
A total of ten people, including the perpetrator, died in the shootings:

- Daryl Lussier Sr., 58, police sergeant and Weise's paternal grandfather
- Michelle Sigana, 32, Lussier's girlfriend
- Derrick Brun, 28, security guard
- Neva Rogers, 62, English teacher
- Alicia White, 14, student
- Thurlene Stillday, 15, student
- Chanelle Rosebear, 15, student
- Chase Lussier, 15, student
- Dewayne Lewis, 15, student
- Jeffrey Weise, 16, perpetrator/student

== Perpetrator ==
Jeff Weise, the perpetrator

Shortly after the shooting, Jeffrey James "Jeff" Weise (August 8, 1988 – March 21, 2005) was identified as the perpetrator. At the time of the shooting, Jeff Weise was living with his paternal grandfather, Daryl Lussier Sr., a sergeant with the Red Lake Police Department, run by the Ojibwe tribal government at the Red Lake Indian Reservation. The household included his grandfather's 32-year-old girlfriend, Michelle Leigh Sigana. Jeff was labelled an outsider and a loner in the Red Lake community and had recently been placed in "homebound" schooling for breaking school rules.

=== Life ===
Jeff Weise was born to a young unmarried couple who separated before he was born. His mother, Joanne Weise, was 17 years old at the time of his birth. Joanne's family insisted that she give up her son to the father, Daryl Lussier Jr., who lived with his parents and family in the Red Lake Indian Reservation. Jeff did not live with his mother again until after he was two years old, when she reclaimed him and took him to live in Minneapolis where they lived in a mobile home behind a factory. Jeff then only occasionally saw his father when his mother sent him on four-hour trips to see him. In reports and in Jeff's online postings, his mother was described as an alcoholic who was physically and emotionally abusive.

His mother was involved with many different men who would also abuse him, and in 1992, his mother began dating a man who also abused Jeff. After having two children, the couple married on June 27, 1998. Weise moved around often because of his mother, and attended several different schools during his adolescence.

In 1997, when Weise was eight years old, his father died by suicide at the age of 32; he shot himself with a shotgun after a days-long standoff with Red Lake tribal police. Weise's grandfather, Daryl Lussier Sr., a sergeant with the tribal police was present at the scene and attempted to talk his son down, to no avail. Two years later in 1999, his mother was in an alcohol-related car accident and suffered severe brain damage. She had to be committed to a nursing home for rehabilitation. Weise was placed in the custody of his paternal grandmother, having to leave Minneapolis, where he had lived most of his life, to live with her and other paternal relatives on the Red Lake reservation.

Weise became close to his paternal grandfather and his younger companion, Michelle Sigana, who had given him his own room with them. The family said he had a good relationship with both. In 2000, his mother and her husband separated; they completed the divorce in May 2004. Their custody arrangements covered only the children they had together, and not Weise. By 2003, his mother had moved to an assisted-living facility; she had recovered enough from her accident to work part-time, and had regained speech. Weise chose to stay with his grandmother rather than rejoin his mother and move again.

In 2002, Weise was forced to repeat the eighth grade because of failing grades and truancy; he enrolled in a special education program at the school called the Learning Center. Beginning in middle school, Weise was frequently taunted and bullied by other students.

In September 2003, Weise enrolled at Red Lake Senior High School in Red Lake. Teachers and fellow students remembered him as withdrawn, and he reportedly had a history of troublesome behavior. At times he was referred to be homeschooled. His grandmother said he had not been in school for five weeks before the shooting. His social studies teacher Wanda Baxter recalled, "[Weise] was a good listener like any other ordinary student. He was quiet but never a troublemaker." Another teacher described Weise as "a pretty bright kid, but ... lazy when it came to school." Several students remembered Weise as being non-violent. A close friend of Weise described him as "the only one I talked to about my problems. He was trustworthy, and he was always capable of understanding what I was going through", and other students also said they could talk to him. According to police investigator findings and media reports, Weise was often bullied or teased in school by classmates. A tall 6'3" youth weighing 250 pounds (115 kg), he was known to wear dark eyeliner, as well as a long black trench coat and other black clothing to school year round. He was referred to as a "goth kid" by many of his classmates. Although Weise was sometimes described as a loner, several students said he had numerous friends. He had a notebook in which he drew what a close friend described as "dark stuff".

=== Internet activities ===
Weise was discovered to have been quite active on the Internet. According to The Smoking Gun, Weise created two violent Flash animations for the flash website Newgrounds, using the alias "Regret". One animation, entitled "Target Practice", features a character who murders three people with a rifle, blows up a police car with a grenade, and kills a Klansman. The 30-second animation ends with the shooter putting the gun in his mouth and pulling the trigger. Weise had created another Flash animation, entitled "Clown", in which a clown kills a man by eating his head. A LiveJournal account, apparently created by Weise, contained three entries posted between December 2004 and January 2005. The weblog was customized to be rendered in black and white. In his posts, Weise expressed his desire for change and salvation in his life. He was also interested in zombies, and under the alias "Blades11", he would publish short stories to the website "Rise of the Dead" about humans trying to survive in a zombie apocalypse.

The Guardian and CBS News alleged that Weise had an account named Todesengel (German: "Angel of death") on nazi.org, a neo-Nazi website operated by the Libertarian National Socialist Green Party. On a talkboard hosted by nazi.org, there were many entries signed by someone going by the name Jeff Weise, stating that he was a Native American from Red Lake. These entries criticized interracial marriage on the reservation and shamed Native American teens for listening to rap music, claiming it makes them violent. He had an admiration for the ideas of Adolf Hitler, and interests in persuading other Native Americans as to the merits of those ideas. On one occasion, he fought with a pupil whom he referred to as a "communist". He also alleged that the school was warned that someone was going to "shoot up" the school on April 20, the birthday of Adolf Hitler and the anniversary of the Columbine High School massacre, and that the school authorities "pinned" the threat on him. According to one of Weise's classmates, the shooter was "obsessed" with the Columbine High School shooting incident. In one of his online accounts, he listed the films Zero Day (2002) and Elephant (2003), two films about pairs of students who plan out and carry out shooting attacks on their respective high schools, as two of his favorite films.

Later, Weise was found to have posted numerous online comments expressing his frustration with living in Red Lake, and feelings that his life was beyond his control. He described the reservation as "a place where people choose alcohol over friendship", where women neglect "their own flesh and blood" for relationships with men, where he could not escape "the grave I'm continually digging for myself". His depression led him to attempt suicide in May 2004, when he cut his wrist. He changed his mind, deciding "this was not the path", and posted his thoughts on the website Above Top Secret:

I had went through a lot of things in my life that had driven me to a darker path than most choose to take. I split the flesh on my wrist with a box opener, painting the floor of my bedroom with blood I shouldn't have spilt. After sitting there for what seemed like hours (which apparently was only minutes), I had the revelation that this was not the path. It was my dicision [sic] to seek medical treatment, as on the other hand I could have chose to sit there until enough blood drained from my downward lascerations on my wrists to die.

=== Medication ===
After he attempted suicide again the following month in June 2004, his aunts arranged with the Red Lake Medical Center for him to be hospitalized at a facility away from the reservation. His continuing treatment included counseling and a prescription for Prozac, an anti-depressant. A friend of Weise said that Weise would take 40 milligrams of Prozac each day, including 20 in the morning and 20 at night. The extended Lussier family had been involved for years in trying to help him, and arranged for Weise to have care and psychiatric treatment for depression. Dr. Leslie Lundt, a psychiatrist, has commented that a parent's suicide put individuals at high risk for psychological problems, as does alcohol abuse in the family.

Weise ended up staying at the Red Lake Medical Center for three days. One source said that his doctor had increased his dosage a week before the shooting, to 60 mg a day of Prozac. His grandmother said he had not seen the doctor since February 21. His aunts said they were concerned about the increase in his dosage.

== Aftermath ==
=== Community ===
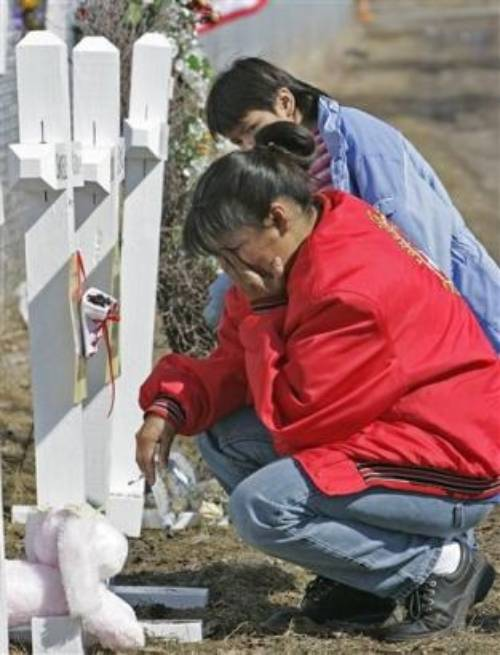
Chanelle Rosebear's mother Sandra Rosebear crying at her memorial

Buck Jourdain, Chairman of the Red Lake Band of Chippewa Indians, said that the shootings were "one of the darkest and most painful occurrences in the history of our tribe."

Derrick Brun, the murdered security guard, was recognized for his bravery, with special recognition by President George W. Bush. Jeffrey May, a sophomore injured while trying to attack Weise, was highly praised. He was featured in Reader's Digest.

The night after the shooting, many people of the community gathered at the high school gymnasium for a healing ceremony. They performed traditional Ojibwe ceremonies and prayed. Within days, preparations started for funerals on the reservation. Tribal members drew from Ojibwe traditions as well as Catholic rites. They "collected bundles of sage, to be given as gifts and burned during funeral ceremonies." Families picked personal items to be placed in the caskets.

Louis Jourdain, the son of the Tribal Chairman Floyd "Buck" Jourdain Jr., was arrested in connection with the shootings on March 28, 2005 and charged with conspiracy to commit murder. He was charged based on several email messages which he exchanged with Weise related to plans for the Red Lake High School shooting. The government dropped the conspiracy charge; however, Jourdain pleaded guilty to transmitting threatening messages through the Internet.

=== Compensation ===
After the murders and Weise's suicide, in April 2005, the Red Lake Band of Chippewa Indians distributed 15 grants to families of victims and people affected by the shootings from a memorial fund that received $200,000 in donations from across the country. Initially, the tribe made 15 grants of $5,000 each to victims and their families, including one to Weise's relatives, to help pay for Weise's funeral and burial. Although some people objected, a tribal spokesman noted his family was not eligible for state compensation and said that they carried "a double burden."

On July 21, 2006, the Red Lake school district reached a settlement with the families of the massacre victims. The school district agreed to pay $1,000,000 total to 21 of the victims' families, the maximum amount allowed by Minnesota law. Of the settlement, $900,000 was to be immediately granted to the families, and the remaining $100,000 to be set aside for future distribution.

=== Legacy ===
Weise's murders and suicide reopened the public debate about Prozac use among children and adolescents. In October 2004, the Food and Drug Administration (FDA) had issued a warning about its use because of its association with more thoughts and acts of suicide and violence. At the time it was the only antidepressant approved for use with children.

Siblings of the victims and survivors participated in the 2018 March for Our Lives, which were designed to show respect for shooting victims seen nationally but especially in Florida and Red Lake.

== See also ==
- Columbine effect
- 2014 Marysville Pilchuck High School shooting, another mass shooting on an Indian reservation
- 2003 Rocori High School shooting
- List of massacres in the United States
- List of school shootings in the United States by death toll
- Mass shootings in the United States
- Contemporary Native American issues in the United States
