= Roger Jourdain =

Ojibwe civic leader

Roger Jourdain

Roger Jourdain (July 27, 1912 – March 21, 2002) was an Ojibwe civic leader who served as chairman of the Red Lake Band of Chippewa from 1959 to 1990. Jourdain is credited with protecting Red Lake's extensive tribal sovereignty and improving tribal infrastructure during his tenure in office.

== Early life ==
Jourdain was born on July 27, 1912. He received an eighth-grade education and worked as a machine operator, participating in the construction of the Alaska Highway and the regional airport in Bemidji, Minnesota. Additionally, Jourdain was a leading member of the "Young Man's Council", a group of Red Lake citizens desirous of governmental reform. A revised constitution supported by the Young Man's Council resulted in the replacement of Red Lake's traditionally-selected governing body by an elected tribal council, of which Jourdain was elected chair in 1959.

== Chairmanship ==
Following his election as chairman, Jourdain undertook a number of projects aimed at improving Red Lake's infrastructure. Shortly after taking office, he reopened the closed Indian Health Service hospital in the town of Red Lake and worked successfully to bring running water to the reservation. Additionally, Jourdain lobbied the federal government to support housing and educational development on the reservation. Jourdain spent considerable amounts of time in Washington, D.C., lobbying both for federal support and for the protection of Red Lake's tribal sovereignty. Jourdain maintained Red Lake's exclusion from the Indian Reorganization Act of 1934, which established the multi-reservation Minnesota Chippewa Tribe; accordingly, Red Lake remained exempt from legislation such as Public Law 280. Additionally, Jourdain formed a political alliance with U.S. Senator Hubert Humphrey, subsequently changing his initial Republican political affiliation to Democratic. In 1976, Jourdain served as a delegate to the 1976 Democratic National Convention and in the Electoral College; he reprised the former role in 1984.

Jourdain worked closely with other tribes, initiating a 1967 intertribal boycott of businesses in Bemidji, Minnesota, which contains a significant Native American population. The boycott was prompted by racist comments made by a county commissioner on a Bemidji radio station. Additionally, Jourdain worked with other tribal politicians to establish a national tribal chairmen's association. He is also credited with the creation of the Minnesota Indian Scholarship Program.

In the late 1970s, Stephanie Hanson, the Red Lake secretary-treasurer, accused Jourdain's administration of "nepotism [and] favoritism," and declined to pay Tribal Council members after a missed meeting. After several disputes over tribal finances, Jourdain removed Hanson from her position. On May 19, 1979, six armed supporters of Hanson seized the Red Lake law enforcement facility and took hostages, prompting the FBI to remove Red Lake police from the reservation. Following this action, a riot erupted on the reservation during which Jourdain's home and several government facilities were burned; two teenagers died during the unrest, and damages sustained totaled $4 million. Following the civil unrest, Jourdain moved to Bemidji, where he resided for the remainder of his tenure as tribal chairman. Complaints persisted against Jourdain's administration throughout the 1980s; its handling of criminal defendants in Red Lake's tribal court was criticized as heavy-handed. In July 1989, Jourdain vetoed a Tribal Council decision, which had stalled the tribe's assumption of services theretofore provided by the Bureau of Indian Affairs and the Indian Health Service. This veto attracted controversy, and Jourdain was defeated for reelection in 1990, losing to former ally Gerald Brun.

=== Post-chairmanship ===
Following his defeat, Jourdain received the National Congress of American Indians' yearly award. He died on March 21, 2002, at North Regional Hospital in Bemidji, at the age of 89. He was preceded in death by his wife, Margaret, to whom he was married for 60 years.
