= Grand Casino Hinckley =

Casino in Minnesota, U.S.

- Interactive map of Grand Casino Hinckley
- Location: Hinckley, Minnesota
- Address: 777 Lady Luck Dr
- Opening date: 1991–1992
- Coordinates: 46°0′33″N 92°53′54″W
- Website: www.grandcasinomn.com

Grand Casino Hinckley is a casino and hotel in Hinckley, Minnesota, United States, owned and operated by the Mille Lacs Band of Ojibwe's Mille Lacs Corporate Ventures. It was formerly owned by Grand Casinos. The casino features gaming, accommodations, dining, conference and banquet facilities, live entertainment, and The Grand Harmony Spa and Grand National Golf Club. The casino employs approximately 3,000 people. The Band also invests in infrastructure and economic development.

== Amenities ==
The Grand Casino Hinckley has 54,800 square feet of gaming space with 28 table games and 2,144 gaming machines. It is the largest employer in Pine County. Attached to the casino, the Grand Hinckley Hotel has 563 rooms; it is the tallest building between The Twin Cities and The Twin Ports on the list of tallest buildings in Minnesota. The casino opened a year after Mille Lacs, in 1992.

=== Performances ===
Entertainers such as Aretha Franklin, Toby Keith and Kid Rock have performed at Grand Casino Hinckley.

== See also ==
- List of casinos in Minnesota
