= Jackpot Junction Casino Hotel =

Casino and hotel in Morton, Minnesota

- Interactive map of Jackpot Junction Casino Hotel
- Location: 39375 County Highway 24 Morton, Minnesota 56270; 44.530917°N 94.999747°W
- Opened: 1984
- Gaming space: 325,000 sq ft (30,200 m^{2})
- Casino type: Land-based
- Website: www.jackpotjunction.com

Jackpot Junction Casino Hotel is a casino and hotel complex located on the Lower Sioux Indian Reservation located along the southern bank of the Minnesota River in Redwood County, Minnesota, just south of the city of Morton. The 46,520 sq ft (4,322 m^{2}) casino is owned and operated by the Lower Sioux Indian Community. Lodging includes a 379-room hotel and a 40 space recreational vehicle park. In addition to the casino, there are several restaurants, a convention center, a Rees Jones-designed golf course, and two live entertainment venues.

== History ==
Jackpot Junction was the first casino in the state of Minnesota.

In 1984, Jackpot Junction opened as a bingo hall. In 1988, Tables and slot machines were added. In 1995, The Lower Sioux Lodge was added. In 1996, A convention center was added. In 1998, The casino becomes the sponsor for the IMCA KSE Racing Products Sprint Cars tour. In 1999, an amphitheater was built. In 2000, the Dacotah Ridge Golf Club opened. In 2000, The Lower Sioux Lodge expanded to 276 rooms. In 2008, A new convention center was built (replacing the old one) and the Lower Sioux Lodge added a new wing, bringing its total number of hotel rooms to 379. The pool/spa area was also renovated and the Carousel Buffet became Seasons Buffet.

== Gaming ==
The casino initially opened as a bingo hall in 1984. Four years later, both slots and table games were added.

=== Table games and slots ===
Jackpot Junction has over 1,000 video slot machines as well as over 20 blackjack tables including a 'High-Limit' area.

== See also ==
- List of casinos in Minnesota
