= Medweganoonind =

Chief of Red Lake Ojibwe band

Medweganoonind (meaning "who is heard spoken to," recorded variously in English as Med-we-gan-on-int, May-dway-gon-on-ind, May-dway-gwa-no-nind and Ma-dwa-ga-no-nint; died 1897 or 1898, lived approximately 84 or 91 years) was a chief of the Ojibwe tribe at Red Lake, Minnesota.

Medweganoonind was a tall and strong man. According to Joseph Gilfillan, "Nobility was stamped upon all his actions and words and his looks...He was very level-headed, true to his friends, patient under seeming neglect, unselfish, and of such a broad vision and sound judgment as would have made him an ideal ruler anywhere."

Medweganoonind was the head chief of the Red Lake Band at the time of the 1889 treaty negotiations, intended to implement the Nelson Act of 1889. He took responsibility in front of a visiting commission appointed by President Benjamin Harrison for defending the rights of the Red Lake Band to a diminished reservation at Red Lake. That reservation remained the common property of the tribe, and was not individually allotted as the U.S. government preferred.

The Medweganoonind Library of Red Lake Nation College is named after Chief Medweganoonind.
