= 2020 Missouri Valley Conference women's basketball tournament =

- Classification: Division I
- Season: 2019–20
- Teams: 10
- Site: TaxSlayer Center; Moline, Illinois
- Television: ESPN+

2019–20 Missouri Valley Conference women's basketball standings
	Conf.				Overall
Team	W		L	PCT	W		L	PCT
No. 23 Missouri State	16	–	2	.889	26	–	4	.867
Drake	14	–	4	.778	22	–	8	.733
Bradley	13	–	5	.722	22	–	7	.759
Illinois State	11	–	7	.611	19	–	10	.655
Northern Iowa	10	–	8	.556	18	–	11	.621
Valparaiso	9	–	9	.500	17	–	12	.586
Southern Illinois	8	–	10	.444	16	–	13	.552
Loyola	6	–	12	.333	15	–	14	.517
Indiana State	3	–	15	.167	5	–	25	.167
Evansville	0	–	18	.000	3	–	26	.103
† 2020 MVC tournament winner As of March 12, 2025; Rankings from AP poll

The 2020 Missouri Valley Conference women's basketball tournament (also known as the Hoops in the Heartland Tournament) was part of the 2019–20 NCAA Division I women's basketball season and was scheduled be played in Moline, Illinois, from March 12–15, 2020, at the TaxSlayer Center. The winner of the tournament would have received the Missouri Valley Conference's automatic bid to the 2020 NCAA tournament. On March 12, the NCAA announced that the tournament was cancelled due to the coronavirus pandemic.

== Seeds ==
2020 Missouri Valley Conference women's basketball tournament seeds
Seed	School	Conf.	Over.
1	‡ # Missouri State	16–2	26–4
2	# Drake	14–4	22–8
3	# Bradley	13–5	22–7
4	# Illinois State	11–7	19–10
5	# UNI	10–8	18–11
6	# Valparaiso	9–9	17–12
7	Southern Illinois	8–10	16–13
8	Loyola–Chicago	6–12	15–14
9	Indiana State	3–15	5–25
10	Evansville	0–18	3–26
‡ – Missouri Valley Conference regular season champions, and tournament No. 1 seed. # - Received a single-bye in the conference tournament. Overall records include all games played in the Missouri Valley Conference tournament.

== See also ==
- 2020 Missouri Valley Conference men's basketball tournament
