= 2019–20 Missouri State Lady Bears basketball team =

Women's college basketball season

2019–20 Missouri State Lady Bears basketball

Missouri Valley Conference regular season
- Conference: Missouri Valley Conference

Ranking
- Coaches: No. 19
- AP: No. 23
- Record: 26–4 (16–2 The Valley)
- Head coach: Amaka Agugua-Hamilton (1st season)
- Assistant coaches: Franqua Bedell; Seth Minter; Tori Jankoska
- Home arena: JQH Arena

2019–20 Missouri Valley Conference women's basketball standings
	Conf.				Overall
Team	W		L	PCT	W		L	PCT
No. 23 Missouri State	16	–	2	.889	26	–	4	.867
Drake	14	–	4	.778	22	–	8	.733
Bradley	13	–	5	.722	22	–	7	.759
Illinois State	11	–	7	.611	19	–	10	.655
Northern Iowa	10	–	8	.556	18	–	11	.621
Valparaiso	9	–	9	.500	17	–	12	.586
Southern Illinois	8	–	10	.444	16	–	13	.552
Loyola	6	–	12	.333	15	–	14	.517
Indiana State	3	–	15	.167	5	–	25	.167
Evansville	0	–	18	.000	3	–	26	.103
† 2020 MVC tournament winner Rankings from AP poll

The 2019–20 Missouri State Lady Bears basketball team represented Missouri State University during the 2019–20 NCAA Division I women's basketball season. The Lady Bears, led by first year head coach Amaka Agugua-Hamilton, played their home games at JQH Arena and were members of the Missouri Valley Conference. They finished the season 26–4, 16–2 in MVC play to finish in first place.

The Missouri Valley Tournament and NCAA tournament was cancelled due to the COVID-19 outbreak.

== Roster ==
2019–20 Missouri State Bears women's basketball team
Players
Coaches

Pos.	#	Name	Height	Year	Previous school	Hometown
G	2	Elle Ruffridge	5 ft 3 in (1.6 m)	Jr	Pocahontas Area High	Pocahontas, IA
F	4	Abby Hipp	6 ft 2 in (1.88 m)	Jr	St. Pius X High	Kansas City, MO
G	11	Brice Calip	5 ft 8 in (1.73 m)	Jr	Sapulpa High	Sapulpa, OK
F	12	Sydney Schultz	6 ft 2 in (1.88 m)	Jr	Oswego East High	Aurora, IL
G	21	Sydney Wilson	5 ft 11 in (1.8 m)	So	Olathe East High	Overland Park, KS
G	22	Alexa Willard	6 ft 2 in (1.88 m)	Sr	Stoutland High	Lebanon, MO
G	23	Mya Bhinhar	5 ft 9 in (1.75 m)	So	Owasso High School	Owasso, OK
G	24	Bri Ellis	5 ft 7 in (1.7 m)	RS Jr	Rock Bridge High	Columbia, MO
F	30	Shameka Ealy	6 ft 1 in (1.85 m)	Sr	Russellville High	Russellville, AR
F	32	Jasmine Franklin	6 ft 1 in (1.85 m)	So	Fayetteville	Fayetteville, AR
G	34	Sydney Manning	5 ft 9 in (1.75 m)	So	Cashion High	Edmond, OK
F	41	Trinity Knapp	6 ft 2 in (1.88 m)	Fr	Mill Valley High	Shawnee, KS
C	50	Emily Gartner	6 ft 4 in (1.93 m)	RS Jr	Hiawatha High	Hiawatha, KS

Head coach

- Amaka Agugua-Hamilton (Hofstra)

Assistant coach(es)

- Franqua Bedell (University of the Ozarks)
- Seth Minter (Culver–Stockton College)
- Tori Jankoska (Michigan State)

Legend

- (C) Team captain
- (S) Suspended
- (I) Ineligible
- (W) Walk-on
- Injured
- Current redshirt

Roster
Last update: April 17, 2020

== Schedule ==
Date time, TV	Rank^{#}	Opponent^{#}	Result	Record	Site (attendance) city, state
Exhibition
October 28, 2019*; 7:00 p.m.		Lincoln	W 109–32	–	JQH Arena (1,645); Springfield, MO
November 1, 2019*; 7:00 p.m.		Southwest Baptist	W 92–49	–	JQH Arena (1,351); Springfield, MO
Non-conference regular season
November 5, 2019*; 3:00 p.m., BTN Plus		at No. 23 Minnesota	W 77–69	1–0	Williams Arena (2,860); Minneapolis, MN
November 8, 2019*; 7:00 p.m., ESPN3		Texas A&M Corpus Christi; Preseason WNIT	W 79–51	2–0	JQH Arena (1,523); Springfield, MO
November 10, 2019*; 3:00 p.m.		at Boise State; Preseason WNIT	W 72–69	3–0	ExtraMile Arena (910); Boise, ID
November 14, 2019*; 7:00 p.m., FSOK		at Oklahoma; Preseason WNIT	W 96–90	4–0	Lloyd Noble Center (1,713); Norman, OK
November 17, 2019*; 3:30 p.m., CBSSN		at No. 7 Oregon State; Preseason WNIT Championship	L 69–80	4–1	Gill Coliseum (4,872); Corvallis, OR
November 22, 2019*; 6:00 p.m., ESPN+		Santa Clara	W 71–64	5–1	JQH Arena (2,113); Springfield, MO
November 25, 2019*; 7:00 p.m., ESPN+		at South Dakota	W 74–66	6–1	Sanford Coyote Sports Center (2,115); Vermillion, SD
December 1, 2019*; 2:00 p.m., ESPN+		Kansas City	W 83–58	7–1	JQH Arena (2,008); Springfield, MO
December 4, 2019*; 6:00 p.m., ESPN+	No. 22	Wichita State	W 68–55	8–1	JQH Arena (2,064); Springfield, MO
December 15, 2019*; 3:00 p.m., ESPN+	No. 20	Missouri	W 79–72	9–1	JQH Arena (5,091); Springfield, MO
December 20, 2019*; 8:00 p.m.	No. 20	at No. 17 Gonzaga	L 52–64	9–2	McCarthey Athletic Center (5,570); Spokane, WA
December 31, 2019*; 1:00 p.m., ESPN3	No. 21	William Jewell	W 111–39	10–2	JQH Arena (2,245); Springfield, MO
Conference Season
January 3, 2020; 3:00 p.m., ESPN+	No. 21	at Loyola-Chicago	W 74–72 ^{OT}	11–2 (1–0)	Gentile Arena (302); Chicago, IL
January 5, 2020; 1:00 p.m., ESPN3	No. 21	at Valparaiso	W 81–68	12–2 (2–0)	Athletics–Recreation Center (431); Valparaiso, IN
January 10, 2020; 7:00 p.m., ESPN+	No. 20	Drake	W 69–67	13–2 (3–0)	JQH Arena (3,015); Springfield, MO
January 12, 2020; 2:00 p.m., ESPN3	No. 20	Northern Iowa	W 80–66	14–2 (4–0)	JQH Arena (2,360); Springfield, MO
January 17, 2020; 6:00 p.m., ESPN+	No. 19	at Southern Illinois	L 68–70	14–3 (4–1)	SIU Arena (432); Carbondale, IL
January 24, 2020; 6:00 p.m., ESPN3		at Indiana State	W 76–55	15–3 (5–1)	Hulman Center (1,570); Terre Haute, IN
January 26, 2020; 1:00 p.m., ESPN+		at Evansville	W 81–55	16–3 (6–1)	Meeks Family Fieldhouse (251); Evansville, IN
January 31, 2020; 7:00 p.m., ESPN+	No. 24	Bradley	W 90–56	17–3 (7–1)	JQH Arena (4,044); Springfield, MO
February 2, 2020; 2:00 p.m., ESPN+	No. 24	Illinois State	W 87–74	18–3 (8–1)	JQH Arena (2,416); Springfield, MO
February 7, 2020; 6:30 p.m., ESPN3		at Northern Iowa	W 66–55	19–3 (9–1)	McLeod Center (1,438); Cedar Falls, IA
February 9, 2020; 2:00 p.m., ESPN+	No. 24	at Drake	W 89–83	20–3 (10–1)	Knapp Center (4,523); Des Moines, IA
February 15, 2020; 3:00 p.m., ESPN3	No. 24	Southern Illinois	W 88–57	21–3 (11–1)	JQH Arena (3,513); Springfield, MO
February 21, 2020; 7:00 p.m., ESPN+	No. 23	Evansville	W 76–62	22–3 (12–1)	JQH Arena (3,495); Springfield, MO
February 23, 2020 p.m., ESPN+	No. 23	Indiana State	W 82–58	23–3 (13–1)	JQH Arena (2,668); Springfield, MO
February 27, 2020; 7:30 p.m., ESPN+	No. 21	at Illinois State	L 66–78	23–4 (13–2)	Redbird Arena (912); Normal, IL
March 1, 2020; 2:00 p.m., ESPN+	No. 21	at Bradley	W 69–66	24–4 (14–2)	Renaissance Coliseum (1,232); Peoria, IL
March 5, 2020; 7:00 p.m., ESPN+	No. 23	Valparaiso	W 85–70	25–4 (15–2)	JQH Arena (2,861); Springfield, MO
March 7, 2020; 2:00 p.m., ESPN3	No. 23	Loyola-Chicago	W 72–61	26–4 (16–2)	JQH Arena (3,292); Springfield, MO
Missouri Valley Women's Tournament
March 13, 2020; ESPN+	(1)	vs. TBD; Quarterfinals	Canceled		TaxSlayer Center; Moline, IL
*Non-conference game. ^{#}Rankings from AP Poll. (#) Tournament seedings in parentheses. All times are in Central Time.

== Rankings ==
2019–20 NCAA Division I women's basketball rankings

+ Regular season polls	Poll	Pre- Season	Week 2	Week 3	Week 4	Week 5	Week 6	Week 7	Week 8	Week 9	Week 10	Week 11	Week 12	Week 13	Week 14	Week 15	Week 16	Week 17	Week 18	Week 19	Final
AP		RV	RV	RV	22	20	20	21	21	20	19	RV	24	24	24	23	21	23	23	23	
Coaches	RV	22	19	18	18	17	19	19	18	17	22	21	19	17	18	17	21	19	19	Not Released	

Legend
	Increase in ranking
	Decrease in ranking
	Not ranked previous week
(RV)	Received Votes
(NR)	Not Ranked

== See also ==
- 2019–20 Missouri State Bears basketball team
