= Red Lake School District =

School district in Minnesota, United States

Red Lake School District ISD #38 is a school district in Red Lake, unincorporated Beltrami County, Minnesota, on the Red Lake Indian Reservation.

Within Beltrami County, the district serves Red Lake, Little Rock, Ponemah, and Redby. It also serves a section of Clearwater County.

For the 2024-2025 school year, there were 1,519 students enrolled.

== Schools ==
- Red Lake Secondary Complex (formerly Red Lake Senior High School and Red Lake Middle School)
- Ponemah Elementary School (pre-kindergarten to 8th grade)
  - For the 2024-2025 school year, there were 136 students enrolled, 96% of whom were Indigenous.
- Red Lake Elementary (formerly Red Lake Elementary School; 1st to 5th grade)
  - For the 2024-2025 school year, there were 526 students enrolled, 95% of whom were Indigenous.
- Alternative Learning Center
