= Seven Clans Casino Thief River Falls =

Coordinates: 48.01865°N 96.03421°W

Seven Clans Casino, Thief River Falls is a tribally owned casino hotel situated near Thief River Falls, Minnesota.

== History ==
Built in the early 90s, the casino was called River Road Casino. The Waterpark and hotel were completed in 2001 and the casino changed the name to Seven Clans Casino Thief River Falls. Seven Clans also has Northwoods Arcade. This is the only northern waterpark for hours.

Red Lake Gaming Enterprises owns two other casinos in Minnesota: Seven Clans Casino Warroad and Seven Clans Casino Red Lake.

== Property ==
The casino's 19,222 square feet (1,785.8 m^{2}) of gaming space include 650 slot machines and four table games.

The hotel has 151 rooms.

The 40,000 sq ft Water Park, with 4 big slides and 4 small slides, was renovated in 2019. The project took over a year at a cost of $1.8 million.

Seven Clans Casino hosts an annual pow-wow, Independence Day fireworks display, and outdoor concerts. Motocross and snowmobile races are also common.

== See also ==
- List of casinos in Minnesota
