= Little Rock, Beltrami County, Minnesota =

Census-designated place in Minnesota, US

Little Rock Gaa-Asiniinsikaag (Ojibwe)
- Census-designated place
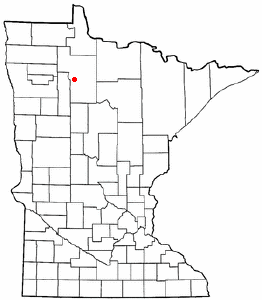
- Location of Little Rock within Beltrami County
- Coordinates: 47°52′05″N 95°06′38″W
- Country: United States
- State: Minnesota
- County: Beltrami

Area
  - Total: 7.54 sq mi (19.54 km^{2})
  - Land: 7.21 sq mi (18.68 km^{2})
  - Water: 0.33 sq mi (0.86 km^{2})
- Elevation: 1,197 ft (365 m)

Population (2020)
  - Total: 1,021
  - Density: 141.5/sq mi (54.65/km^{2})
- Time zone: UTC-6 (Central (CST))
  - Summer (DST): UTC-5 (CDT)
- Area code: 218
- FIPS code: 27-37656
- GNIS feature ID: 1867327

Little Rock (Ojibwe: Gaa-Asiniinsikaag) is a census-designated place (CDP) within the Lower Red Lake unorganized territory in Beltrami County, Minnesota, United States. The population was 1,208 at the 2010 census.

== Geography ==
According to the United States Census Bureau, the CDP has a total area of 7.5 square miles (19.6 km^{2}), of which 7.2 square miles (18.7 km^{2}) is land and 0.3 square mile (0.9 km^{2}) (4.38%) is water.

== Demographics ==
Historical population
Census	Pop.	Note	%±
2000	1,055		—
2010	1,208		14.5%
2020	1,021		−15.5%
U.S. Decennial Census

As of the census of 2000, there were 1,055 people, 281 households, and more than 234 families residing in the CDP. The population density was 80.9 inhabitants per square mile (31.2/km^{2}). There were 298 housing units at an average density of 22.8/sq mi (8.8/km^{2}). The racial makeup of the CDP was 0.76% White, 0.09% Black or African American, 98.86% Native American, and 0.28% from two or more races. Hispanic or Latino of any race were 1.90% of the population.

There were 281 households, out of which 54.4% had children under the age of 18 living with them, 26.7% were married couples living together, 38.1% had a female householder with no husband present, and 16.7% were non-families. 12.8% of all households were made up of individuals, and 3.9% had someone living alone who was 65 years of age or older. The average household size was 3.75 and the average family size was 3.91.

In the CDP, the population was spread out, with 45.4% under the age of 18, 11.5% from 18 to 24, 26.5% from 25 to 44, 12.1% from 45 to 64, and 4.5% who were 65 years of age or older. The median age was 20 years. For every 100 females, there were 94.3 males. For every 100 females age 18 and over, there were 88.9 males.

The median income for a household is $25,688, and the median income for a family was $20,893. Males had a median income of $24,167 versus $23,542 for females. The per capita income for the CDP was $8,668. About 30.1% of families and 31.8% of the population were below the poverty line, including 41.1% of those under age 18 and 22.2% of those age 65 or over.

== Education ==
It is in the Red Lake School District, which operates Red Lake Elementary Complex and Red Lake Secondary Complex (formerly Red Lake High School).
