= Ponemah, Minnesota =

Census-designated place in Minnesota, US

Ponemah Obaashiing (Ojibwe)
- CDP
- Location of Ponemah, Minnesota
- Coordinates: 48°1′45″N 94°55′17″W
- Country: United States
- State: Minnesota
- County: Beltrami

Area
  - Total: 10.95 sq mi (28.37 km^{2})
  - Land: 10.95 sq mi (28.37 km^{2})
  - Water: 0 sq mi (0.00 km^{2})
- Elevation: 1,198 ft (365 m)

Population (2020)
  - Total: 599
  - Density: 54.7/sq mi (21.11/km^{2})
- Time zone: UTC-6 (Central (CST))
  - Summer (DST): UTC-5 (CDT)
- ZIP code: 56666
- Area code: 218
- FIPS code: 27-51892
- GNIS feature ID: 0649628

Ponemah (Ojibwe: Obaashiing) is a census-designated place (CDP) within the Lower Red Lake unorganized territory in Beltrami County, Minnesota, United States. As of the 2020 census, Ponemah had a population of 599.

== History ==
Though its name in the Ojibwe language is "Obaashiing" meaning "At the narrows", "Ponemah" is derived from another Ojibwe word baanimaa, meaning "later (on), after(wards)", as used in The Song of Hiawatha. Ponemah contained a government school for Ojibwe children. A post office called Ponemah has been in operation since 1901.

== Geography ==
According to the U.S. Census, the CDP has a total area of 11.0 square miles (28 km^{2}), all land.

== Demographics ==
Historical population
Census	Pop.	Note	%±
2000	874		—
2010	724		−17.2%
2020	599		−17.3%
U.S. Decennial Census

As of the census of 2000, there were 874 people, 209 households, and 174 families residing in the CDP. The population density was 44.6 inhabitants per square mile (17.2/km^{2}). There were 215 housing units at an average density of 11.0/sq mi (4.2/km^{2}). The racial makeup of the CDP was 0.34% White, 99.20% Native American, 0.23% from other races, and 0.23% from two or more races. Hispanic or Latino people of any race were 1.83% of the population. It is the most Native American census designated location in the United States by percent.

There were 209 households, out of which 51.2% had children under the age of 18 living with them, 21.1% were married couples living together, 44.5% had a female householder with no husband present, and 16.7% were non-families. 13.9% of all households were made up of individuals, and 1.9% had someone living alone who was 65 years of age or older. The average household size was 4.18 and the average family size was 4.37.

In the CDP, the population was spread out, with 49.5% under the age of 18, 13.3% from 18 to 24, 23.1% from 25 to 44, 11.6% from 45 to 64, and 2.5% who were 65 years of age or older. The median age was 18 years. For every 100 females, there were 105.6 males. For every 100 females age 18 and over, there were 107.0 males.

The median income for a household is $13,571, and the median income for a family was $13,527. Males had a median income of $21,250 versus $16,719 for females. The per capita income for the CDP was $4,000. About 57.3% of families and 52.3% of the population were below the poverty line, including 52.7% of those under age 18 and 58.3% of those age 65 or over.

== Politics ==
Presidential election results

Presidential elections results
Year	Republican	Democratic	Third parties
2020	2.4% 10	96.1% 398	1.5% 6
2016	0.6% 2	90.3% 289	9.1% 31
2012	0.3% 1	99.2% 385	0.5% 3
2008	5.5% 20	93.7% 342	0.8% 3
2004	5.5% 22	94.5% 379	0.0% 0
2000	11.4% 33	79.6% 230	9.0% 59

== Education ==
Ponemah is in the Red Lake School District, which operates Ponemah Elementary School (K-8), and Red Lake Secondary Complex (formerly Red Lake High School).
