= Red Lake Secondary Complex =

- RL Home of the Ogichidaag & Ogichidaakwag

Location
- 23990 Hwy. 1 East; Red Lake, Minnesota 56671; United States; 47°52′43″N 95°0′51″W

Information
- Type: Public High School
- Established: 1936
- School district: Red Lake School District
- Principal: Tracy Olson
- Teaching staff: 20.97 (FTE)
- Grades: 9–12
- Enrollment: 377 (2024-2025)
- Student to teacher ratio: 17.98
- Colors: Red, white and black
- Mascot: Ogichidaag and Ogichidaakwag
- Website: redlake.k12.mn.us/o/rlsc

Red Lake Secondary Complex, formerly Red Lake Senior High School, is a public state-funded high school in unincorporated Red Lake, in Beltrami County, northern Minnesota, United States. The high school is located on the Red Lake Indian Reservation on which members of the Red Lake Band of Chippewa (Ojibwe) live, and has over 300 students. The school's mascots are the Ogichidaag and Ogichidaakwag (warriors and lady warriors). The school is a part of Red Lake School District (Independent School District #38).

Public education first began in Red Lake with the formation of School District 119. In 1935, ground was broken on the construction of what is now Red Lake High School, with the doors first opening to students in 1936.

The school became well known after the 2005 shooting, receiving much attention in the media and internet. The 2016 women's basketball team was named a Dream Team of the Week by the WNBA Atlanta Dream.

The school used to host its own radio station, KMOD (94.1 FM).

== Attendance zone ==
Within Beltrami County the district serves Red Lake, Little Rock, Ponemah, and Redby. It also serves a section of Clearwater County.

== 2005 shooting ==
On March 21, 2005, 16-year-old Jeff Weise, a former student at the school, drove his grandfather's patrol vehicle to Red Lake High School. He first shot and killed the school security guard Derrick Brun, before proceeding through the school main hallway. He then entered a study hall classroom where he shot and killed five students and one teacher, and wounded five students. He later left the classroom and injured two students in the school main hallway. He later engaged in a brief shoot-out with police in a classroom. No officers were wounded. He then committed suicide inside the study hall classroom by a shotgun-wound to the head.

Weise had killed seven people inside the school, and had previously murdered his grandfather and his grandfather's companion at his home.

== Ojibwe culture ==
Red Lake High School students can sign up for Ojibwe language classes (the language is also taught in elementary and middle schools in the district) and have a chance to learn Ojibwe traditions from community elders. A culture center, opened in 2004, is furnished in Ojibwe style. Decorations include carved animal symbols of the seven clans of the Red Lake Band (bear, turtle, bullhead, mink, eagle, pine marten and kingfisher) placed on a high shelf running around the room, and the words for the four directions carved into the walls.
