= Redby, Minnesota =

Census-designated place in Minnesota, US

Redby Madaabiimog (Ojibwe)
- CDP
- Location of Redby, Minnesota
- Coordinates: 47°52′18″N 94°55′30″W
- Country: United States
- State: Minnesota
- County: Beltrami

Area
  - Total: 7.54 sq mi (19.53 km^{2})
  - Land: 7.29 sq mi (18.88 km^{2})
  - Water: 0.25 sq mi (0.64 km^{2})
- Elevation: 1,217 ft (371 m)

Population (2020)
  - Total: 1,302
  - Density: 178.6/sq mi (68.95/km^{2})
- Time zone: UTC-6 (Central (CST))
  - Summer (DST): UTC-5 (CDT)
- ZIP code: 56670
- Area code: 218
- FIPS code: 27-53386
- GNIS feature ID: 0649888

Redby (/ˈrɛdbi/ RED-bee) Ojibwe: Madaabiimog) is a census-designated place (CDP) within the Lower Red Lake unorganized territory in Beltrami County, Minnesota, United States. As of the 2020 census, Redby had a population of 1,302.

Redby derives its name from nearby Red Lake.

== Geography ==
According to the United States Census Bureau, the CDP has a total area of 5.6 square miles (15 km^{2}), of which 5.4 square miles (14 km^{2}) are land and 0.2-square-mile (0.52 km^{2}) (4.40%) is water.

== Demographics ==
As of the census of 2000, there were 957 people, 244 households, and 203 families residing in the community. The population density was 82.0 inhabitants per square mile (31.7/km^{2}). There were 251 housing units at an average density of 21.5/sq mi (8.3/km^{2}). The racial makeup of the CDP was 1.04% White, 97.81% Native American, 0.21% Asian, and 0.94% from two or more races. Hispanic or Latino of any race were 1.57% of the population.

There were 244 households, of which 54.5% had children under the age of 18 living with them, 30.7% were married couples living together, 38.1% had a female householder with no husband present, and 16.4% were non-families. 13.5% of all households were made up of individuals, and 3.7% had someone living alone who was 65 years of age or older. The average household size was 3.81 and the average family size was 4.03.

In the CDP, the population was spread out, with 45.6% under the age of 18, 9.6% from 18 to 24, 25.7% from 25 to 44, 13.4% from 45 to 64, and 5.7% who were 65 years of age or older. The median age was 21 years. For every 100 females, there were 87.6 males. For every 100 females age 18 and over, there were 86.7 males.

The median income for a household is $30,000, and the median income for a family was $30,588. Males had a median income of $25,642 versus $26,500 for females. The per capita income for the CDP was $9,886. About 33.5% of families and 36.9% of the population were below the poverty line, including 42.1% of those under age 18 and 28.0% of those age 65 or over.

Historical population
Census	Pop.	Note	%±
1910	92		—
1920	93		1.1%
1930	208		123.7%
1990	787		—
2000	957		21.6%
2010	1,334		39.4%
2020	1,302		−2.4%
U.S. Decennial Census

== Education ==
It is in the Red Lake School District, which operates Red Lake Elementary Complex and Red Lake Secondary Complex (formerly Red Lake High School).
