= Red Lake, Minnesota =

Census-designated place in Minnesota, US

Red Lake, Minnesota Ogaakaaning (Ojibwe)
- CDP
- Location of Red Lake in Beltrami County and Minnesota

- Location within Minnesota Location within the United States
- Coordinates: 47°52′38″N 95°0′44″W
- Country: United States
- State: Minnesota
- County: Beltrami

Area
  - Total: 5.31 sq mi (13.76 km^{2})
  - Land: 5.08 sq mi (13.15 km^{2})
  - Water: 0.24 sq mi (0.62 km^{2})
- Elevation: 1,211 ft (369 m)

Population (2020)
  - Total: 1,786
  - Density: 351.9/sq mi (135.86/km^{2})
- Time zone: UTC-6 (Central (CST))
  - Summer (DST): UTC-5 (CDT)
- ZIP code: 56671
- Area code: 218
- FIPS code: 27-53458
- GNIS feature ID: 0649864

Red Lake (Ojibwe: Ogaakaaning) is a census-designated place (CDP) within the Lower Red Lake unorganized territory located in Beltrami County, Minnesota, United States. As of the 2020 census, Red Lake had a total population of 1,786. The Red Lake Indian Reservation is based in Red Lake.

== History ==
=== 2005 shooting ===
On March 21, 2005, the community was the site of a shooting spree. A high school student murdered his grandfather and the grandfather's girlfriend at his home, before killing five students, two adults, and then himself at the local high school.

== Geography ==
According to the United States Census Bureau, the CDP has a total area of 5.1 mi^{2} (13.1 km^{2}), of which 4.8 mi^{2} (12.5 km^{2}) is land and 0.2 mi^{2} (0.6 km^{2}), 4.70%, is water.

== Demographics ==
Historical population
Census	Pop.	Note	%±
1990	1,068		—
2000	1,430		33.9%
2010	1,731		21.0%
2020	1,786		3.2%
U.S. Decennial Census; 2020 Census

=== 2020 census ===
As of the 2020 census, Red Lake had a population of 1,786. The median age was 26.2 years. 37.8% of residents were under the age of 18 and 8.0% of residents were 65 years of age or older. For every 100 females there were 88.2 males, and for every 100 females age 18 and over there were 90.9 males age 18 and over.

0.0% of residents lived in urban areas, while 100.0% lived in rural areas.

There were 462 households in Red Lake, of which 51.3% had children under the age of 18 living in them. Of all households, 19.9% were married-couple households, 25.3% were households with a male householder and no spouse or partner present, and 39.6% were households with a female householder and no spouse or partner present. About 20.6% of all households were made up of individuals and 7.5% had someone living alone who was 65 years of age or older.

There were 478 housing units, of which 3.3% were vacant. The homeowner vacancy rate was 0.0% and the rental vacancy rate was 3.0%.

Racial composition as of the 2020 census
Race	Number	Percent
White	12	0.7%
Black or African American	0	0.0%
American Indian and Alaska Native	1,740	97.4%
Asian	0	0.0%
Native Hawaiian and Other Pacific Islander	0	0.0%
Some other race	2	0.1%
Two or more races	32	1.8%
Hispanic or Latino (of any race)	32	1.8%

=== 2000 census ===
At the 2000 census there were 1,430 people, 400 households, and 320 families in the CDP. The population density was 110.2/mi^{2} (42.5/km^{2}). There were 421 housing units at an average density of 32.4² (12.5/km). The racial makeup of the CDP was 97.69% Native American, 1.82% White, 0.28% Black or African American, 0.07% from other races, and 0.14% from two or more races. Hispanic or Latino of any race were 1.47%.

Of the 400 households 49.0% had children under the age of 18 living with them, 24.5% were married couples living together, 42.0% had a female householder with no husband present, and 20.0% were non-families. 18.3% of households were one person and 4.3% were one person aged 65 or older. The average household size was 3.53 and the average family size was 3.88.

The age distribution was 44.1% under the age of 18, 12.0% from 18 to 24, 24.1% from 25 to 44, 15.6% from 45 to 64, and 4.3% 65 or older. The median age was 21 years. For every 100 females, there were 94.0 males. For every 100 females age 18 and over, there were 84.3 males.

The median household income was $23,224, and the median family income was $20,800. Males had a median income of $22,257 versus $22,431 for females. The per capita income for the CDP was $8,787. About 36.8% of families and 36.4% of the population were below the poverty line, including 42.8% of those under the age of 18 and 44.4% of those 65 and older.

== Education ==
It is in the Red Lake School District, which operates Red Lake Elementary Complex and Red Lake Secondary Complex (formerly Red Lake High School).

== Media ==
=== Television ===
Channel	Callsign	Affiliation	Branding	Subchannels		Owner
(Virtual)	Callsign	Affiliation	Branding	Channel	Programming	Owner
9.1	K36OA-D (KAWE Translator)	PBS	Lakeland PBS	9.2; 9.3; 9.4; 9.5; 9.6	First Nations Experience; PBS Kids; Create; PBS Encore; Minnesota Channel	Red Lake Band of Chippewa Indians
11.1	K20MN-D (KRII Translator)	NBC	KBJR 6	11.2; 11.3	CBS; H&I/MyNetworkTV	Red Lake Band of Chippewa Indians
12.1	K22MF-D (KCCW Translator)	CBS	WCCO 4	12.2	Start TV	Red Lake Band of Chippewa Indians
13.1	K24MM-D (WIRT Translator)	ABC	WDIO	13.2; 13.3	MeTV; Ion Television	Red Lake Band of Chippewa Indians
19.1	K32MF-D (WGN Translator)	The CW	WGN 9			Red Lake Band of Chippewa Indians
26.1	K34NP-D (KFTC Translator)	FOX	FOX 9	26.2; 26.3	FOX9+ Movies!	Red Lake Band of Chippewa Indians
