= Shotley (disambiguation) =

Shotley is a village and civil parish in Suffolk, England.

Shotley may also refer to several places:

- Shotley, Minnesota, in Shotley Township, a township in the United States
- Shotley, Northamptonshire, a location in England
- St Andrew's Church, Shotley, Northumberland, England
- Shotley Peninsula, a peninsula between the rivers Orwell and Stour near Ipswich in south Suffolk, England
- Shotley Bridge, a village in County Durham, England
- Shotley Brook, a stream in Minnesota, United States
- RNTE Shotley, known in the Royal Navy as HMS Ganges, was a Royal Naval Training Establishment at Shotley Gate, south Suffolk
