= Battle Township, Beltrami County, Minnesota =

Township in Minnesota, United States

Battle Township, Minnesota
- Township
- Location of Battle Township, within Beltrami County, Minnesota
- Coordinates: 47°57′12″N 94°42′15″W
- Country: United States
- State: Minnesota
- County: Beltrami

Area
  - Total: 13.7 sq mi (35.6 km^{2})
  - Land: 13.7 sq mi (35.5 km^{2})
  - Water: 0.039 sq mi (0.1 km^{2})
- Elevation: 1,180 ft (360 m)

Population (2020)
  - Total: 47
  - Density: 3.4/sq mi (1.3/km^{2})
- Time zone: UTC-6 (Central (CST))
  - Summer (DST): UTC-5 (CDT)
- FIPS code: 27-03952
- GNIS feature ID: 0663521

Battle Township is a township in Beltrami County, Minnesota, United States. The population was 47 as of the 2020 census. Battle Township took its name from the Battle River.

== Geography ==
According to the United States Census Bureau, the township has a total area of 13.8 square miles (36 km^{2}), of which 13.7 square miles (35 km^{2}) is land and 0.04 square miles (0.10 km^{2}) (0.22%) is water.

=== Unincorporated towns ===
- Saum at 47.974681°N 94.676917°W

(This list is based on USGS data and may include former settlements.)

=== Adjacent townships ===
- Shotley Township (northeast)
- Woodrow Township (east)
- Cormant Township (southeast)
- Quiring Township (south)

== Demographics ==
Historical population
Census	Pop.	Note	%±
1900	21		—
1910	348		1,557.1%
1920	142		−59.2%
1930	108		−23.9%
1940	139		28.7%
1950	98		−29.5%
1960	73		−25.5%
1970	63		−13.7%
1980	67		6.3%
1990	53		−20.9%
2000	60		13.2%
2010	46		−23.3%
2020	47		2.2%
U.S. Decennial Census

As of the census of 2000, there were 60 people, 22 households, and 13 families residing in the township. The population density was 4.4 people per square mile (1.7/km^{2}). There were 29 housing units at an average density of 2.1/sq mi (0.8/km^{2}). The racial makeup of the township was 93.33% White and 6.67% Native American.

There were 22 households, out of which 31.8% had children under the age of 18 living with them, 45.5% were married couples living together, 4.5% had a female householder with no husband present, and 40.9% were non-families. 40.9% of all households were made up of individuals, and 22.7% had someone living alone who was 65 years of age or older. The average household size was 2.73 and the average family size was 3.85.

In the township the population was spread out, with 30.0% under the age of 18, 11.7% from 18 to 24, 25.0% from 25 to 44, 23.3% from 45 to 64, and 10.0% who were 65 years of age or older. The median age was 35 years. For every 100 females, there were 140.0 males. For every 100 females age 18 and over, there were 121.1 males.

The median income for a household in the township was $23,750, and the median income for a family was $63,750. Males had a median income of $31,667 versus $19,583 for females. The per capita income for the township was $18,980. There were 26.7% of families and 36.4% of the population living below the poverty line, including 75.0% of under eighteens and 55.6% of those over 64.
