= Woodrow Township, Minnesota =

Woodrow Township is the name of some places in the U.S. state of Minnesota:

- Woodrow Township, Beltrami County, Minnesota
- Woodrow Township, Cass County, Minnesota
