= Kenogama Lake =

Lake in the state of Minnesota, United States

- Location within Minnesota
- Location: Itasca County, Minnesota
- Coordinates: 47°29′37″N 94°21′50″W
- Type: Lake
- Surface area: 486 acres (197 ha)
- Max. depth: 10 feet (3.0 m)

Kenogama Lake is a lake in Itasca County, in the U.S. state of Minnesota. The lake stands to the east of Pennington, north-west of Lake Winnibigoshish.

It is a shallow forest lake which has historically been significant for migrating diving duck species, in particular Lesser Scaup ducks, but there is evidence that their numbers may be declining. Lesser Scaup were notably present in the autumns of the early 1990s, which led to an increase in pressure for duck hunting, however, the duck numbers appeared to have declined by the time of a 2007 study.

The lake has been a walleye fry rearing site since 1983, with implications for the lake's wildlife. Lake Kenogama has a clear water profile, with abundant submerged microphytes, compared to more turbid conditions and a sparse microphyte population in other lakes in the area. In 2007 the lake was subject to a two year, two reports, review by the Minnesota Department of Natural Resources (DNR). The study showed that some of the potential causes for reduced duck habitat include shifts in migration patterns, weather changes, and decline in key food resources such as aquatic invertebrates. Monitoring in 2007–2008 showed abundant fish, primarily golden shiners and walleyes, in 2007. However, adult walleyes were absent in 2008, likely due to hypoxia and consequent winterkill; macroinvertebrates were sparse, and zooplankton were dominated by small taxa, speculated to be reduced by fish predation. In 2008 the water quality appeared to exhibit some signs of moving to a more turbid state. The two year summary report stated that further monitoring of the lake would take place from 2008 onwards.

The lake has been deemed by the DNR to have a Sensitive Lakeshore and a Sensitive Shoreland, a marker for places that contain a unique or critical ecological habitat. Much of the lakeshore, excluding a section on the eastern side, has a sensitivity index of 6, the highest level. Nest boxes for birds were installed around the lake in 2007 as part of a conservation project.

The Kenogama Trail is a 14.6-mile (23.5 km) trail that encircles the lake. It is open from October through June.

== See also ==
- List of lakes in Minnesota
