= John Persell =

American politician

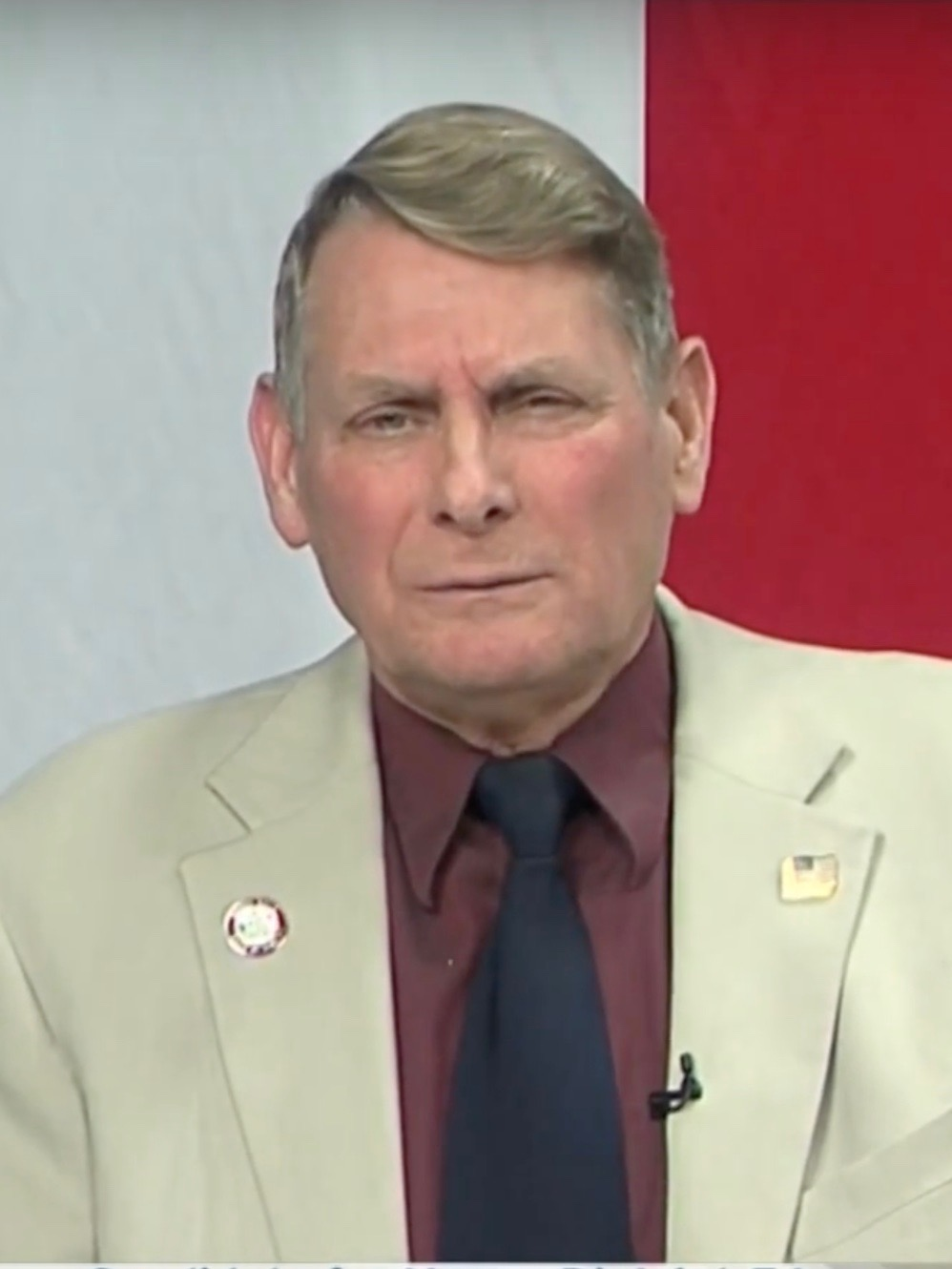

Member of the Minnesota House of Representatives
- In office January 8, 2019 – January 4, 2021
- Preceded by: Matt Bliss
- Succeeded by: Matt Bliss
- Constituency: District 5A
- In office January 6, 2009 – January 2, 2017
- Preceded by: Frank Moe
- Succeeded by: Matt Bliss
- Constituency: District 5A (2013–2017); District 4A (2009–2013)

Personal details
- Born: 1950 (age 75–76)
- Party: Democratic–Farmer–Labor
- Children: 3
- Education: Bemidji State University

John Sterling Persell, Jr. (born 1950) is an American DFL politician who represented District 5A in the Minnesota House of Representatives in northern Minnesota, first winning election in 2008.

== Early life, education, and career ==
Persell majored in biology at Bemidji State University, and served in the United States Air Force. He was a member of the Beltrami County Soil and Water Conservation Board, and of the Frohn Township Board of Supervisors. Persell is a member of the American Legion Honor Guard, and has worked as a mentor in the STEM Program (Science, Technology, Engineering, Math) at Leech Lake Tribal College in Cass Lake. He is also a retired water quality specialist and environmental policy analyst for the Leech Lake Band of Ojibwe.

== Minnesota House of Representatives ==
Persell was elected in 2008, running after two-term Representative Frank Moe opted not to seek reelection. He was reelected in 2010, 2012, and 2014.

In 2016 he lost reelection to Republican Matt Bliss. In a rematch in 2018, Persell beat Bliss by just 11 votes. He was chosen to lead the Environment and Natural Resources Policy Committee.

In 2020, he was challenged by Bliss again, and defeated by 1,485 votes.
