= Shotley Brook, Minnesota =

Unorganized territory in Beltrami County, Minnesota, US

Coordinates: 48°04′05″N 94°29′21″W

- Unorganized territory
- Location of Shotley Brook, within Beltrami County, Minnesota
- Country: United States
- State: Minnesota
- County: Beltrami

Area
  - Total: 35.62 sq mi (92.3 km^{2})
  - Land: 35.62 sq mi (92.3 km^{2})
  - Water: 0 sq mi (0 km^{2})

Population (2020)
  - Total: 27
  - Density: 0.76/sq mi (0.29/km^{2})
- Time zone: UTC-6 (Central (CST))
  - Summer (DST): UTC-5 (CDT)
- Area code: 218

Shotley Brook is an unorganized territory in Beltrami County, Minnesota, United States. The population was 27 at the 2020 census.

== Geography ==
According to the United States Census Bureau, the unorganized territory has a total area of 35.9 square miles (92.9 km^{2}), all land.

== Demographics ==
Historical population
Census	Pop.	Note	%±
1980	18		—
1990	23		27.8%
2000	17		−26.1%
2010	25		47.1%
2020	27		8.0%
U.S. Decennial Census

As of the census of 2000, there were 17 people, 8 households, and 6 families residing in the unorganized territory. The population density was 0.5 inhabitants per square mile (0.19/km^{2}). There were 13 housing units at an average density of 0.4 per square mile (0.15/km^{2}). The racial makeup of the unorganized territory was 100.00% White.

There were 8 households, out of which 12.5% had children under the age of 18 living with them, 75.0% were married couples living together, and 25.0% were non-families. 25.0% of all households were made up of individuals, and 25.0% had someone living alone who was 65 years of age or older. The average household size was 2.13 and the average family size was 2.50.

In the unorganized territory, the population was spread out, with 17.6% under the age of 18, 17.6% from 25 to 44, 41.2% from 45 to 64, and 23.5% who were 65 years of age or older. The median age was 46 years. For every 100 females, there were 70.0 males. For every 100 females age 18 and over, there were 100.0 males.

The median income for a household in the unorganized territory was $71,250, and the median income for a family was $72,083. Males had a median income of $0 versus $0 for females. The per capita income for the unorganized territory was $40,408. None of the population or the families were below the poverty line.
