= Buzzle Lake =

Lake in the state of Minnesota, United States

- Location within Minnesota
- Location: Beltrami County, Minnesota
- Coordinates: 47°37′10″N 95°8′1″W
- Type: Lake
- Surface area: 189 acres (76 ha)
- Max. depth: 83 ft (25 m)
- Surface elevation: 1,335 feet (407 m)

Buzzle Lake is a lake in Beltrami County, Minnesota, in the United States. The lake is northwest of the town of Pinewood, Minnesota. Buzzle Lake was named for a pioneer who settled on the lake.

The lake is 189 acres in size, and is approximately 83 feet deep at its deepest point. Fish present in the lake include Bluegill and Northern Pike.

== See also ==
- List of lakes in Minnesota
