= Upper Red Lake, Minnesota =

Unorganized territory in Minnesota

Coordinates: 48°16′16″N 95°00′42″W

- Unorganized territory
- Location of Upper Red Lake, within Beltrami County, Minnesota
- Country: United States
- State: Minnesota
- County: Beltrami

Area
  - Total: 843.37 sq mi (2,184.3 km^{2})
  - Land: 694.83 sq mi (1,799.6 km^{2})
  - Water: 148.54 sq mi (384.7 km^{2})

Population (2020)
  - Total: 25
  - Density: 0.036/sq mi (0.014/km^{2})
- Time zone: UTC-6 (Central (CST))
  - Summer (DST): UTC-5 (CDT)
- Area code: 218

Upper Red Lake is an unorganized territory in Beltrami County, Minnesota, U.S. It is a part of the Red Lake Indian Reservation. The population was 25 at the 2020 census.

Historical population
Census	Pop.	Note	%±
1970	101		—
1980	37		−63.4%
1990	27		−27.0%
2000	25		−7.4%
2010	14		−44.0%
2020	25		78.6%
U.S. Decennial Census

== Geography ==
According to the United States Census Bureau, the unorganized territory has a total area of 841.9 square miles (2,180.4 km^{2}), of which 694.2 square miles (1,798.1 km^{2}) is land and 147.6 square miles (382.3 km^{2}) (17.53%) is water.
