= Leroy E. Matson =

American judge (1896–1960)

Leroy E. Matson (February 11, 1896 – February 28, 1960) was an American jurist.

Born in Crookston, Minnesota, Matson grew up on a farm in Saum, Beltrami County, Minnesota. Matson graduated from Bemidji High School. He then received his bachelor's degree from University of Minnesota and his law degree from the University of Minnesota Law School. Matson practiced law in Minneapolis, Minnesota and was a Republican. He served in the United States Army during World War I. Matson served on the Minnesota Supreme Court from 1945 until 1960. Matson died of a cancerous tumor in his chest in Minneapolis, Minnesota.
