= Hines, Minnesota =

Unincorporated community in Minnesota, United States

Hines
- Unincorporated community
- Location within Minnesota Location within the United States
- Coordinates: 47°41′10″N 94°37′58″W
- Country: United States
- State: Minnesota
- County: Beltrami
- Elevation: 896 ft (273 m)
- Time zone: UTC-6 (Central (CST))
  - Summer (DST): UTC-5 (CDT)
- ZIP code: 56647
- Area code: 218
- GNIS feature ID: 656594

Hines is an unincorporated community in Beltrami County, Minnesota, United States. Hines is located on U.S. Route 71, 3 miles (4.8 km) northeast of Tenstrike. Hines has a post office with ZIP code 56647.

Hines was named for William Hines, a lumberman.
