= Brook Lake, Minnesota =

Unorganized territory in Beltrami County, Minnesota, US

- Unorganized territory
- Location of Brook Lake, within Beltrami County, Minnesota
- Coordinates: 47°27′21″N 94°28′40″W
- Country: United States
- State: Minnesota
- County: Beltrami

Area
  - Total: 36.3 sq mi (94 km^{2})
  - Land: 25.3 sq mi (66 km^{2})
  - Water: 11 sq mi (28 km^{2})

Population (2020)
  - Total: 251
  - Density: 9.92/sq mi (3.83/km^{2})
- Time zone: UTC–6 (CST)
  - Summer (DST): UTC–5 (CDT)
- Area code: 218

Brook Lake is an unorganized territory in Beltrami County, Minnesota, United States. The population was 251 at the 2020 census.

Brook Lake was named from a lake into which flows a brook.

== Geography ==
According to the United States Census Bureau, the unorganized territory has a total area of 36.3 square miles (94.0 km^{2}), of which 25.3 square miles (65.6 km^{2}) is land and 11.0 square miles (28.4 km^{2}) (30.26%) is water.

== Demographics ==
Historical population
Census	Pop.	Note	%±
1970	145		—
1980	183		26.2%
1990	176		−3.8%
2000	200		13.6%
2010	233		16.5%
2020	251		7.7%
U.S. Decennial Census

As of the census of 2000, there were 200 people, 79 households, and 45 families residing in the unorganized territory. The population density was 7.9 inhabitants per square mile (3.1/km^{2}). There were 180 housing units at an average density of 7.1 per square mile (2.7/km^{2}). The racial makeup of the unorganized territory was 56.50% White, 43.00% Native American, 0.50% from other races. Hispanic or Latino of any race were 3.50% of the population.

There were 79 households, out of which 25.3% had children under the age of 18 living with them, 46.8% were married couples living together, 6.3% had a female householder with no husband present, and 41.8% were non-families. 30.4% of all households were made up of individuals, and 13.9% had someone living alone who was 65 years of age or older. The average household size was 2.53 and the average family size was 3.39.

In the unorganized territory the population was spread out, with 25.5% under the age of 18, 11.0% from 18 to 24, 27.0% from 25 to 44, 23.5% from 45 to 64, and 13.0% who were 65 years of age or older. The median age was 38 years. For every 100 females, there were 102.0 males. For every 100 females age 18 and over, there were 93.5 males.

The median income for a household in the unorganized territory was $21,094, and the median income for a family was $31,667. Males had a median income of $53,750 versus $25,208 for females. The per capita income for the unorganized territory was $14,440. About 7.5% of families and 17.1% of the population were below the poverty line, including none of those under the age of 18 and 14.3% of those 65 or over.
