= Matt Bliss =

American politician

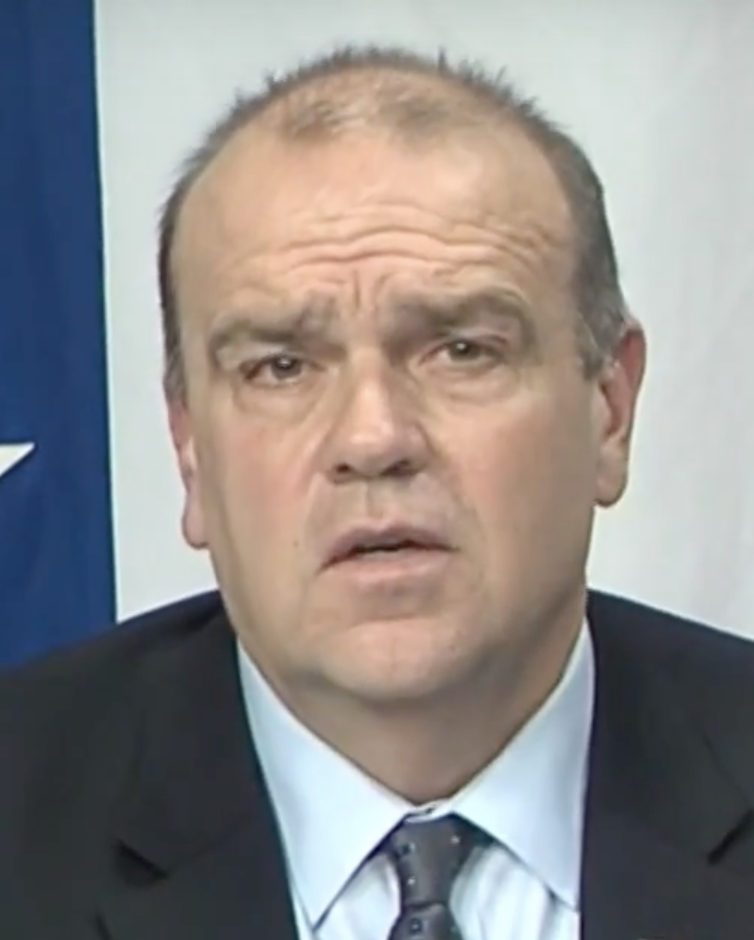

Member of the Minnesota House of Representatives
- Incumbent
- Assumed office January 5, 2021
- Preceded by: John Persell
- Constituency: District 2B (2023–present); District 5A (2021–2023)
- In office January 3, 2017 – January 7, 2019
- Preceded by: John Persell
- Succeeded by: John Persell
- Constituency: District 5A (2017–2019)

Personal details
- Party: Republican
- Spouse(s): Christine (died of cancer); Emily
- Children: 4
- Education: United States Navy
- Occupation: Small business owner
- Website: Government website Campaign website

Military service
- Allegiance: United States Navy
- Unit: Communications and electronics

Matt Bliss is an American politician serving in the Minnesota House of Representatives since 2021, who also served from 2017 to 2019. A member of the Republican Party of Minnesota, Bliss represents District 2B in northern Minnesota, which includes parts of Becker, Beltrami, Cass, Clearwater, Hubbard, Itasca, and Mahnomen Counties.

== Early life, education, and career ==
Bliss was raised on a farm and is one of ten siblings. He joined the Navy after high school and was trained in communications and electronics.

Bliss owns Bliss Point Resort along Cass Lake and worked as an IT director for the Red Lake Nation. He was the president of the Pennington Resort Association.

Bliss ran unsuccessfully for the Beltrami County Board of Commissioners in 2014.

== Minnesota House of Representatives ==
Bliss was elected to the Minnesota House of Representatives in 2016. He defeated four-term DFL incumbent John Persell. In 2018, Bliss lost to Persell by 11 votes. A state-mandated recount confirmed Persell's victory. In 2020, Bliss once again defeated Persell, and was reelected in 2022. Bliss criticized Persell for his co-authorship of a red-flag gun control proposal and Democrats for defunding the police, though Persell stated he advocated for more public safety funding.

Bliss co-chairs the Veteran and Military Affairs Committee and sits on the Judiciary Finance and Civil Law and Public Safety Finance and Policy Committees.

== Electoral history ==
2016 Minnesota State House - District 5A
Party	Candidate	Votes	%
Republican	Matt Bliss	10,318	53.88
Democratic (DFL)	John Persell	8,808	45.99
Write-in		25	0.13
Total votes		19,151	100.0
Republican gain from Democratic (DFL)			

2018 Minnesota State House - District 5A
Party	Candidate	Votes	%
Democratic (DFL)	John Persell	8,454	50.01
Republican	Matt Bliss	8,443	49.95
Write-in		7	0.04
Total votes		16,904	100.0
Democratic (DFL) gain from Republican			

2020 Minnesota State House - District 5A
Party	Candidate	Votes	%
Republican	Matt Bliss	11,482	53.37
Democratic (DFL)	John Persell	9,996	46.46
Write-in		36	0.17
Total votes		21,514	100.0
Republican gain from Democratic (DFL)			

2022 Minnesota State House - District 2B
Party	Candidate	Votes	%
Republican	Matt Bliss	11,310	63.46
Democratic (DFL)	Erika Bailey-Johnson	6,505	36.50
Write-in		8	0.04
Total votes		17,823	100.0
Republican hold			

2024 Minnesota State House - District 5A
Party	Candidate	Votes	%
Republican	Matt Bliss	14,372	63.73
Democratic (DFL)	Michael Reyes	8,168	36.22
Write-in		10	0.04
Total votes		22,550	100
Republican hold			

== Personal life ==
Bliss lives in Pennington, Minnesota with his wife Emily, and has four children. He was previously married to Christine until she died of cancer. He is a member of the Minnesota Deer Hunters’ Association, Pheasants Forever, Ducks Unlimited, and the Ruffed Grouse Society.
