= Quiring Township, Beltrami County, Minnesota =

Quiring Township, Minnesota
- Township
- Location of Quiring Township, within Beltrami County, Minnesota
- Coordinates: 47°52′35″N 94°43′5″W
- Country: United States
- State: Minnesota
- County: Beltrami

Area
  - Total: 23.9 sq mi (62.0 km^{2})
  - Land: 23.9 sq mi (61.9 km^{2})
  - Water: 0 sq mi (0.0 km^{2})
- Elevation: 1,194 ft (364 m)

Population (2020)
  - Total: 79
  - Density: 3.3/sq mi (1.3/km^{2})
- Time zone: UTC-6 (Central (CST))
  - Summer (DST): UTC-5 (CDT)
- ZIP code: 56630
- Area code: 218
- FIPS code: 27-52828
- GNIS feature ID: 0665368

Quiring Township is a township in Beltrami County, Minnesota, United States. The population was 79 as of the 2020 census.

== Geography ==
According to the United States Census Bureau, the township has a total area of 23.9 square miles (62.0 km^{2}), of which 23.9 square miles (61.9 km^{2}) is land and 0.04 square miles (0.1 km^{2}) (0.08%) is water.

=== Unincorporated towns ===
- Quiring at 47.882457°N 94.699697°W

(This list is based on USGS data and may include former settlements.)

=== Major highways ===
- Minnesota State Highway 1

=== Adjacent townships ===
- Battle Township (north)
- Woodrow Township (northeast)
- Cormant Township (east)
- Langor Township (southeast)
- O'Brien Township (south)

=== Cemeteries ===
The township contains these two cemeteries: Caldwell and Quiring Township.

== Demographics ==
Historical population
Census	Pop.	Note	%±
1900	17		—
1910	161		847.1%
1920	134		−16.8%
1930	112		−16.4%
1940	138		23.2%
1950	103		−25.4%
1960	88		−14.6%
1970	71		−19.3%
1980	67		−5.6%
1990	75		11.9%
2000	85		13.3%
2010	70		−17.6%
2020	79		12.9%
U.S. Decennial Census

As of the census of 2000, there were 85 people, 34 households, and 24 families residing in the township. The population density was 3.6 inhabitants per square mile (1.4/km^{2}). There were 42 housing units at an average density of 1.8 per square mile (0.69/km^{2}). The racial makeup of the township was 83.53% White, 7.06% African American, 2.35% Native American, and 7.06% from two or more races. Hispanic or Latino of any race were 2.35% of the population.

There were 34 households, out of which 26.5% had children under the age of 18 living with them, 55.9% were married couples living together, 2.9% had a female householder with no husband present, and 29.4% were non-families. 29.4% of all households were made up of individuals, and 17.6% had someone living alone who was 65 years of age or older. The average household size was 2.50 and the average family size was 2.96.

In the township the population was spread out, with 25.9% under the age of 18, 10.6% from 18 to 24, 24.7% from 25 to 44, 18.8% from 45 to 64, and 20.0% who were 65 years of age or older. The median age was 40 years. For every 100 females, there were 97.7 males. For every 100 females age 18 and over, there were 103.2 males.

The median income for a household in the township was $19,167, and the median income for a family was $25,250. Males had a median income of $13,750 versus $14,167 for females. The per capita income for the township was $9,218. There were 8.7% of families and 18.3% of the population living below the poverty line, including 16.7% of under eighteens and 8.7% of those over 64.
