= Buzzle Township, Beltrami County, Minnesota =

Township in Minnesota, United States

Buzzle Township, Minnesota
- Township
- Location of Buzzle Township, within Beltrami County, Minnesota
- Coordinates: 47°37′12″N 95°7′8″W
- Country: United States
- State: Minnesota
- County: Beltrami

Area
  - Total: 36.1 sq mi (93.6 km^{2})
  - Land: 34.9 sq mi (90.3 km^{2})
  - Water: 1.3 sq mi (3.3 km^{2})
- Elevation: 1,410 ft (430 m)

Population (2020)
  - Total: 306
  - Density: 8.78/sq mi (3.39/km^{2})
- Time zone: UTC-6 (Central (CST))
  - Summer (DST): UTC-5 (CDT)
- FIPS code: 27-09082
- GNIS feature ID: 0663718

Buzzle Township is a township in Beltrami County, Minnesota, United States. The population was 306 as of the 2020 census. Buzzle Township took its name from Buzzle Lake.

== Geography ==
According to the United States Census Bureau, the township has a total area of 36.2 square miles (94 km^{2}), of which 34.9 square miles (90 km^{2}) is land and 1.3 square miles (3.4 km^{2}) (3.57%) is water.

=== Unincorporated towns ===
- Aure at 47.673288°N 95.120558°W
- Pinewood at 47.597176°N 95.127783°W

(This list is based on USGS data and may include former settlements.)

=== Lakes ===
- Buzzle Lake
- Ess Lake (west edge)
- Funkley Lake
- Henson Lake
- Horseshow Lake
- Little Buzzle Lake
- Long Lake
- Spring Lake
- Tepee Lake
- White Fish Lake

=== Adjacent townships ===
- Roosevelt Township (north)
- Maple Ridge Township (northeast)
- Liberty Township (east)
- Eckles Township (southeast)
- Lammers Township (south)
- Shevlin Township, Clearwater County (southwest)
- Dudley Township, Clearwater County (west)

=== Cemeteries ===
The township contains these two cemeteries: Buzzle and Pinewood.

== Demographics ==
Historical population
Census	Pop.	Note	%±
1900	172		—
1910	354		105.8%
1920	386		9.0%
1930	470		21.8%
1940	471		0.2%
1950	355		−24.6%
1960	236		−33.5%
1970	182		−22.9%
1980	213		17.0%
1990	277		30.0%
2000	286		3.2%
2010	310		8.4%
2020	306		−1.3%
U.S. Decennial Census

As of the census of 2000, there were 286 people, 114 households, and 81 families residing in the township. The population density was 8.2 inhabitants per square mile (3.2/km^{2}). There were 134 housing units at an average density of 3.8 per square mile (1.5/km^{2}). The racial makeup of the township was 98.95% White, 0.70% African American, and 0.35% from two or more races. Hispanic or Latino of any race were 0.35% of the population.

There were 114 households, out of which 26.3% had children under the age of 18 living with them, 64.0% were married couples living together, 3.5% had a female householder with no husband present, and 28.9% were non-families. 22.8% of all households were made up of individuals, and 9.6% had someone living alone who was 65 years of age or older. The average household size was 2.51 and the average family size was 2.94.

In the township the population was spread out, with 21.7% under the age of 18, 9.8% from 18 to 24, 25.9% from 25 to 44, 28.3% from 45 to 64, and 14.3% who were 65 years of age or older. The median age was 41 years. For every 100 females, there were 110.3 males. For every 100 females age 18 and over, there were 105.5 males.

The median income for a household in the township was $25,000, and the median income for a family was $26,071. Males had a median income of $22,500 versus $22,143 for females. The per capita income for the township was $17,151. About 21.3% of families and 25.7% of the population were below the poverty line, including 27.6% of those under the age of eighteen and 33.3% of those 65 or over.
