= Shotley Township, Beltrami County, Minnesota =

Shotley Township, Minnesota
- Township
- Location of Shotley Township, within Beltrami County, Minnesota
- Coordinates: 48°4′35″N 94°38′8″W
- Country: United States
- State: Minnesota
- County: Beltrami

Area
  - Total: 46.8 sq mi (121.2 km^{2})
  - Land: 32.8 sq mi (84.9 km^{2})
  - Water: 14.0 sq mi (36.3 km^{2})
- Elevation: 1,188 ft (362 m)

Population (2020)
  - Total: 32
  - Density: 0.98/sq mi (0.38/km^{2})
- Time zone: UTC-6 (Central (CST))
  - Summer (DST): UTC-5 (CDT)
- ZIP code: 56650
- Area code: 218
- FIPS code: 27-60070
- GNIS feature ID: 0665605

Shotley Township is a township in Beltrami County, Minnesota, United States. The population was 32 as of the 2020 census. Shotley Township took its name from Shotley Brook.

== Geography ==
According to the United States Census Bureau, the township has a total area of 46.8 square miles (121.2 km^{2}), of which 32.8 square miles (84.9 km^{2}) is land and 14.0 square miles (36.3 km^{2}) (29.96%) is water.

=== Unincorporated towns ===
- Otto at 48.088017°N 94.607463°W
- Shotley at 48.048849°N 94.638856°W

(This list is based on USGS data and may include former settlements.)

=== Lakes ===
- Upper Red Lake (east edge)

=== Adjacent townships ===
- Waskish Township (northeast)
- Woodrow Township (south)
- Battle Township (southwest)

== Demographics ==
Historical population
| Census | Pop. | Note | %± |
|---|---|---|---|
| 1910 | 205 | | — |
| 1920 | 237 | | 15.6% |
| 1930 | 156 | | −34.2% |
| 1940 | 211 | | 35.3% |
| 1950 | 147 | | −30.3% |
| 1960 | 73 | | −50.3% |
| 1970 | 78 | | 6.8% |
| 1980 | 64 | | −17.9% |
| 1990 | 57 | | −10.9% |
| 2000 | 54 | | −5.3% |
| 2010 | 35 | | −35.2% |
| 2020 | 32 | | −8.6% |
U.S. Decennial Census

As of the census of 2000, there were 54 people, 29 households, and 20 families residing in the township. The population density was 1.6 people per square mile (0.6/km^{2}). There were 126 housing units at an average density of 3.8/sq mi (1.5/km^{2}). The racial makeup of the township was 100.00% White.

There were 29 households, out of which 6.9% had children under the age of 18 living with them, 65.5% were married couples living together, 3.4% had a female householder with no husband present, and 31.0% were non-families. 31.0% of all households were made up of individuals, and 13.8% had someone living alone who was 65 years of age or older. The average household size was 1.86 and the average family size was 2.20.

In the township the population was spread out, with 5.6% under the age of 18, 5.6% from 18 to 24, 11.1% from 25 to 44, 44.4% from 45 to 64, and 33.3% who were 65 years of age or older. The median age was 60 years. For every 100 females, there were 116.0 males. For every 100 females age 18 and over, there were 131.8 males.

The median income for a household in the township was $21,458, and the median income for a family was $32,500. Males had a median income of $33,750 versus $0 for females. The per capita income for the township was $17,802. There were 12.5% of families and 9.5% of the population living below the poverty line, including no under eighteens and none of those over 64.
