= Waskish, Minnesota =

Unincorporated community in Minnesota, United States

Waskish Mashkiigonigamiiziibiing (Ojibwe)
- Unincorporated community
- Location within Minnesota Location within the United States
- Coordinates: 48°09′41″N 94°30′45″W
- Country: United States
- State: Minnesota
- County: Beltrami
- Elevation: 1,181 ft (360 m)
- Time zone: UTC-6 (Central (CST))
  - Summer (DST): UTC-5 (CDT)
- ZIP code: 56685
- Area code: 218
- GNIS feature ID: 653828

Waskish (/ˈwɑːskɪʃ/ WAHSS-kish, Ojibwe: Mashkiigonigamiiziibiing) is an unincorporated community in Waskish Township, Beltrami County, Minnesota, United States. Waskish is located on the eastern shore of Upper Red Lake and Minnesota State Highway 72, 15.5 miles (24.9 km) north of Kelliher. Waskish has a post office with ZIP code 56685.

== Climate ==
Climate data for Waskish 4NE, Minnesota, 1991–2020 normals, 1963-2020 extremes: 1191ft (363m)
Month	Jan	Feb	Mar	Apr	May	Jun	Jul	Aug	Sep	Oct	Nov	Dec	Year
Record high °F (°C)	47 (8)	61 (16)	77 (25)	92 (33)	95 (35)	95 (35)	98 (37)	95 (35)	95 (35)	89 (32)	72 (22)	52 (11)	98 (37)
Mean maximum °F (°C)	38.2 (3.4)	43.2 (6.2)	56.9 (13.8)	72.1 (22.3)	82.5 (28.1)	87.0 (30.6)	88.9 (31.6)	88.8 (31.6)	84.6 (29.2)	75.6 (24.2)	55.1 (12.8)	39.5 (4.2)	91.3 (32.9)
Mean daily maximum °F (°C)	16.3 (−8.7)	22.7 (−5.2)	36.4 (2.4)	50.9 (10.5)	64.7 (18.2)	74.3 (23.5)	79.2 (26.2)	77.7 (25.4)	68.6 (20.3)	52.7 (11.5)	35.9 (2.2)	21.9 (−5.6)	50.1 (10.1)
Daily mean °F (°C)	4.9 (−15.1)	9.6 (−12.4)	24.0 (−4.4)	39.0 (3.9)	52.1 (11.2)	62.2 (16.8)	66.4 (19.1)	64.3 (17.9)	55.6 (13.1)	41.9 (5.5)	27.3 (−2.6)	12.3 (−10.9)	38.3 (3.5)
Mean daily minimum °F (°C)	−6.4 (−21.3)	−3.5 (−19.7)	11.6 (−11.3)	27.0 (−2.8)	39.6 (4.2)	50.1 (10.1)	53.6 (12.0)	50.8 (10.4)	42.6 (5.9)	31.2 (−0.4)	18.7 (−7.4)	2.7 (−16.3)	26.5 (−3.0)
Mean minimum °F (°C)	−32.3 (−35.7)	−28.3 (−33.5)	−16.6 (−27.0)	10.8 (−11.8)	24.2 (−4.3)	35.1 (1.7)	40.9 (4.9)	37.5 (3.1)	26.7 (−2.9)	16.3 (−8.7)	−1.8 (−18.8)	−22.6 (−30.3)	−34.9 (−37.2)
Record low °F (°C)	−49 (−45)	−48 (−44)	−36 (−38)	−11 (−24)	15 (−9)	25 (−4)	35 (2)	32 (0)	20 (−7)	5 (−15)	−25 (−32)	−36 (−38)	−49 (−45)
Average precipitation inches (mm)	0.74 (19)	0.64 (16)	1.08 (27)	1.62 (41)	3.08 (78)	4.43 (113)	4.00 (102)	3.51 (89)	3.02 (77)	2.39 (61)	1.16 (29)	0.90 (23)	26.57 (675)
Average snowfall inches (cm)	9.3 (24)	7.0 (18)	6.1 (15)	3.7 (9.4)	0.0 (0.0)	0.0 (0.0)	0.0 (0.0)	0.0 (0.0)	trace	1.8 (4.6)	6.3 (16)	11.2 (28)	45.4 (115)
Source 1: NOAA
Source 2: XMACIS (snowfall, temp records & monthly max/mins)
