= Salol, Minnesota =

Salol
- Unincorporated community
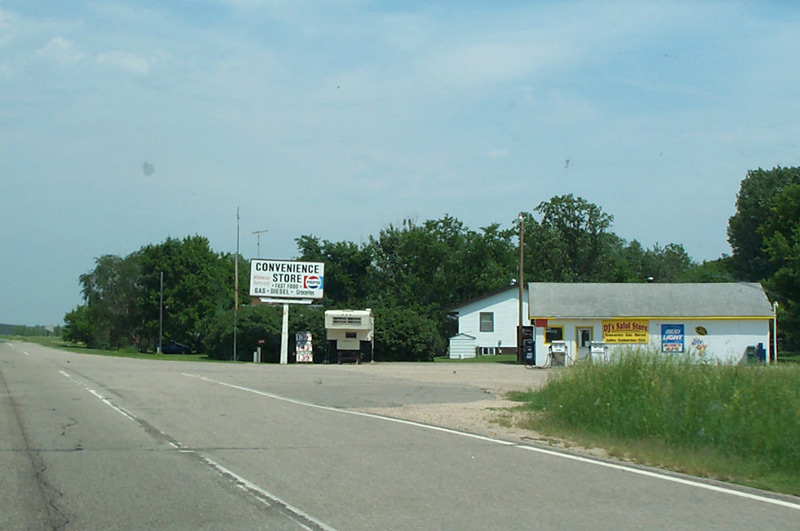
- A convenience store in Salol, MN

- Location within Minnesota Location within the United States
- Coordinates: 48°51′58″N 95°34′15″W
- Country: United States
- State: Minnesota
- County: Roseau County
- Township: Enstrom Township
- Elevation: 1,079 ft (329 m)
- Time zone: UTC-6 (Central (CST))
  - Summer (DST): UTC-5 (CDT)
- ZIP code: 56756
- Area code: 218
- GNIS feature ID: 651120

Salol is an unincorporated community in Enstrom Township, Roseau County, Minnesota, United States.

The community is located between Roseau and Warroad along State Highway 11 (MN 11).

Hay Creek flows through the community. Salol is located within ZIP code 56756.

== History ==
A post office called Salol was established in 1907, and remained in operation until 1993. The community was named after the drug salol by a pharmacist turned county official.
