= Pinewood, Minnesota =

Unincorporated community in Minnesota, United States

Pinewood
- Unincorporated community
- Location within Minnesota Location within the United States
- Coordinates: 47°35′50″N 95°07′40″W
- Country: United States
- State: Minnesota
- County: Beltrami
- Elevation: 1,417 ft (432 m)
- Time zone: UTC-6 (Central (CST))
  - Summer (DST): UTC-5 (CDT)
- Area code: 218
- GNIS feature ID: 649506

Pinewood is a small unincorporated area in section 33 of Buzzle Township in Beltrami County, Minnesota, United States. Some local sources have estimated the area population at 147, however that number cannot be confirmed. It is approximately 19 miles northwest of Bemidji, where most community services are available.

== History ==
The town of Pinewood was established in 1879, and had a station of the Soo Line Railroad. At its peak Pinewood also had a Post Office, general store, mercantile store, sawmill, livery stable, and a hotel.
