= Minnie Township, Beltrami County, Minnesota =

Minnie Township, Minnesota
- Township
- Location of Minnie Township, within Beltrami County, Minnesota
- Coordinates: 48°19′53″N 95°15′42″W
- Country: United States
- State: Minnesota
- County: Beltrami

Area
  - Total: 34.9 sq mi (90.3 km^{2})
  - Land: 34.9 sq mi (90.3 km^{2})
  - Water: 0 sq mi (0.0 km^{2})
- Elevation: 1,237 ft (377 m)

Population (2020)
  - Total: 22
  - Density: 0.63/sq mi (0.24/km^{2})
- Time zone: UTC-6 (Central (CST))
  - Summer (DST): UTC-5 (CDT)
- FIPS code: 27-43360
- GNIS feature ID: 0665000

Minnie Township is a township in Beltrami County, Minnesota, United States. The population was 22 as of the 2020 census.

== Geography ==
According to the United States Census Bureau, the township has a total area of 34.9 square miles (90.3 km^{2}), all land.

=== Unincorporated towns ===
- Four Town at 48.281076°N 95.335544°W
- Malcolm at 48.324411°N 95.335541°W

(This list is based on USGS data and may include former settlements.)

=== Adjacent townships ===
- Steenerson Township (south)
- Hamre Township (southwest)
- Spruce Grove Township (west)

== Demographics ==
Historical population
Census	Pop.	Note	%±
1910	103		—
1920	142		37.9%
1930	100		−29.6%
1940	76		−24.0%
1950	61		−19.7%
1960	26		−57.4%
1970	19		−26.9%
1980	15		−21.1%
1990	9		−40.0%
2000	19		111.1%
2010	26		36.8%
2020	22		−15.4%
U.S. Decennial Census

As of the census of 2000, there were 19 people, 11 households, and 5 families residing in the township. The population density was 0.5 people per square mile (0.2/km^{2}). There were 51 housing units at an average density of 1.5/sq mi (0.6/km^{2}). The racial makeup of the township was 100.00% White.

There were 11 households, out of which none had children under the age of 18 living with them, 36.4% were married couples living together, 9.1% had a female householder with no husband present, and 54.5% were non-families. 54.5% of all households were made up of individuals, and 27.3% had someone living alone who was 65 years of age or older. The average household size was 1.73 and the average family size was 2.60.

In the township the population was spread out, with 21.1% from 18 to 24, 10.5% from 25 to 44, 36.8% from 45 to 64, and 31.6% who were 65 years of age or older. The median age was 50 years. For every 100 females, there were 90.0 males. For every 100 females age 18 and over, there were 90.0 males.

The median income for a household in the township was $46,250, and the median income for a family was $46,250. Males had a median income of $68,750 versus $0 for females. The per capita income for the township was $42,900. None of the population and none of the families were below the poverty line.
