= Wolverton, Minnesota =

City in Minnesota, United States

- City
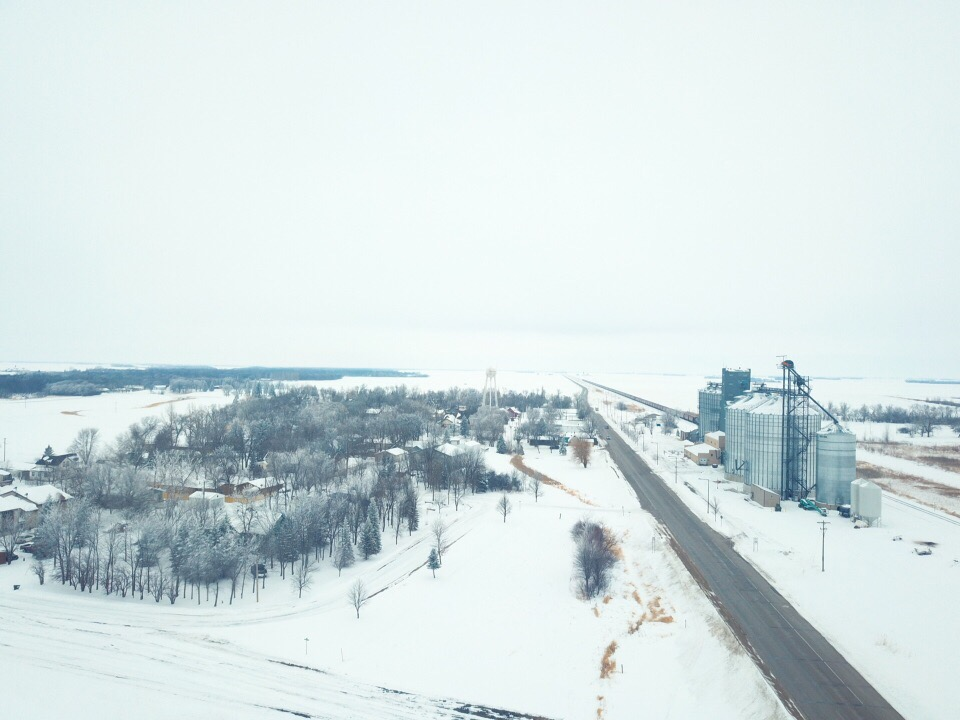
- Skyline of Wolverton

- Location of Wolverton within Wilkin County and state of Minnesota
- Coordinates: 46°33′47″N 96°44′10″W
- Country: United States
- State: Minnesota
- County: Wilkin
- Platted: 1884
- Incorporated: April 24, 1913

Government
  - Mayor: Chad Erickson

Area
  - Total: 0.349 sq mi (0.905 km^{2})
  - Land: 0.349 sq mi (0.905 km^{2})
  - Water: 0 sq mi (0.000 km^{2})
- Elevation: 928 ft (283 m)

Population (2020)
  - Total: 128
  - Estimate (2022): 123
  - Density: 366.4/sq mi (141.48/km^{2})
- Time zone: UTC–6 (Central (CST))
  - Summer (DST): UTC–5 (CDT)
- ZIP Code: 56594
- Area code: 218
- FIPS code: 27-71392
- GNIS feature ID: 2397359
- Sales tax: 6.875%
- Website: cityofwolverton.com

Wolverton is a city in Wilkin County, Minnesota, United States. The population was 128 at the 2020 census. It is part of the Wahpeton, ND—MN Micropolitan Statistical Area.

== Geography ==
According to the United States Census Bureau, the city has a total area of 0.349 square miles (0.90 km^{2}), all land.

Wolverton is along U.S. Highway 75 and Wilkin County Road 30. Wolverton contains one property listed on the National Register of Historic Places, the 1906 Wolverton Public School.

== Demographics ==
Historical population
| Census | Pop. | Note | %± |
|---|---|---|---|
| 1920 | 170 | | — |
| 1930 | 206 | | 21.2% |
| 1940 | 222 | | 7.8% |
| 1950 | 198 | | −10.8% |
| 1960 | 204 | | 3.0% |
| 1970 | 171 | | −16.2% |
| 1980 | 177 | | 3.5% |
| 1990 | 158 | | −10.7% |
| 2000 | 122 | | −22.8% |
| 2010 | 142 | | 16.4% |
| 2020 | 128 | | −9.9% |
| 2022 (est.) | 123 | | −3.9% |
U.S. Decennial Census; 2020 Census

=== 2010 census ===
As of the 2010 census, there were 142 people, 58 households, and 39 families living in the city. The population density was 507.1 inhabitants per square mile (195.8/km^{2}). There were 67 housing units at an average density of 239.3 per square mile (92.4/km^{2}). The racial makeup of the city was 95.8% White and 4.2% from two or more races.

There were 58 households, of which 27.6% had children under the age of 18 living with them, 60.3% were married couples living together, 3.4% had a female householder with no husband present, 3.4% had a male householder with no wife present, and 32.8% were non-families. 31.0% of all households were made up of individuals, and 12% had someone living alone who was 65 years of age or older. The average household size was 2.45 and the average family size was 3.05.

The median age in the city was 34 years. 28.9% of residents were under the age of 18; 3.5% were between the ages of 18 and 24; 30.9% were from 25 to 44; 21.7% were from 45 to 64; and 14.8% were 65 years of age or older. The gender makeup of the city was 52.1% male and 47.9% female.

=== 2000 census ===
As of the 2000 census, there were 122 people, 55 households, and 32 families living in the city. The population density was 429.4 inhabitants per square mile (165.8/km^{2}). There were 73 housing units at an average density of 256.9 per square mile (99.2/km^{2}). The racial makeup of the city was 96.72% White, 2.46% from other races, and 0.82% from two or more races. Hispanic or Latino of any race were 2.46% of the population.

There were 55 households, out of which 23.6% had children under the age of 18 living with them, 45.5% were married couples living together, 1.8% had a female householder with no husband present, and 41.8% were non-families. 36.4% of all households were made up of individuals, and 23.6% had someone living alone who was 65 years of age or older. The average household size was 2.22 and the average family size was 2.91.

In the city, the population was spread out, with 23.0% under the age of 18, 12.3% from 18 to 24, 27.0% from 25 to 44, 17.2% from 45 to 64, and 20.5% who were 65 years of age or older. The median age was 37 years. For every 100 females, there were 82.1 males. For every 100 females age 18 and over, there were 95.8 males.

The median income for a household in the city was $29,063, and the median income for a family was $35,000. Males had a median income of $25,000 versus $28,000 for females. The per capita income for the city was $16,839. There were 11.1% of families and 15.7% of the population living below the poverty line, including 32.3% of under eighteens and 6.7% of those over 64.

== Gallery ==
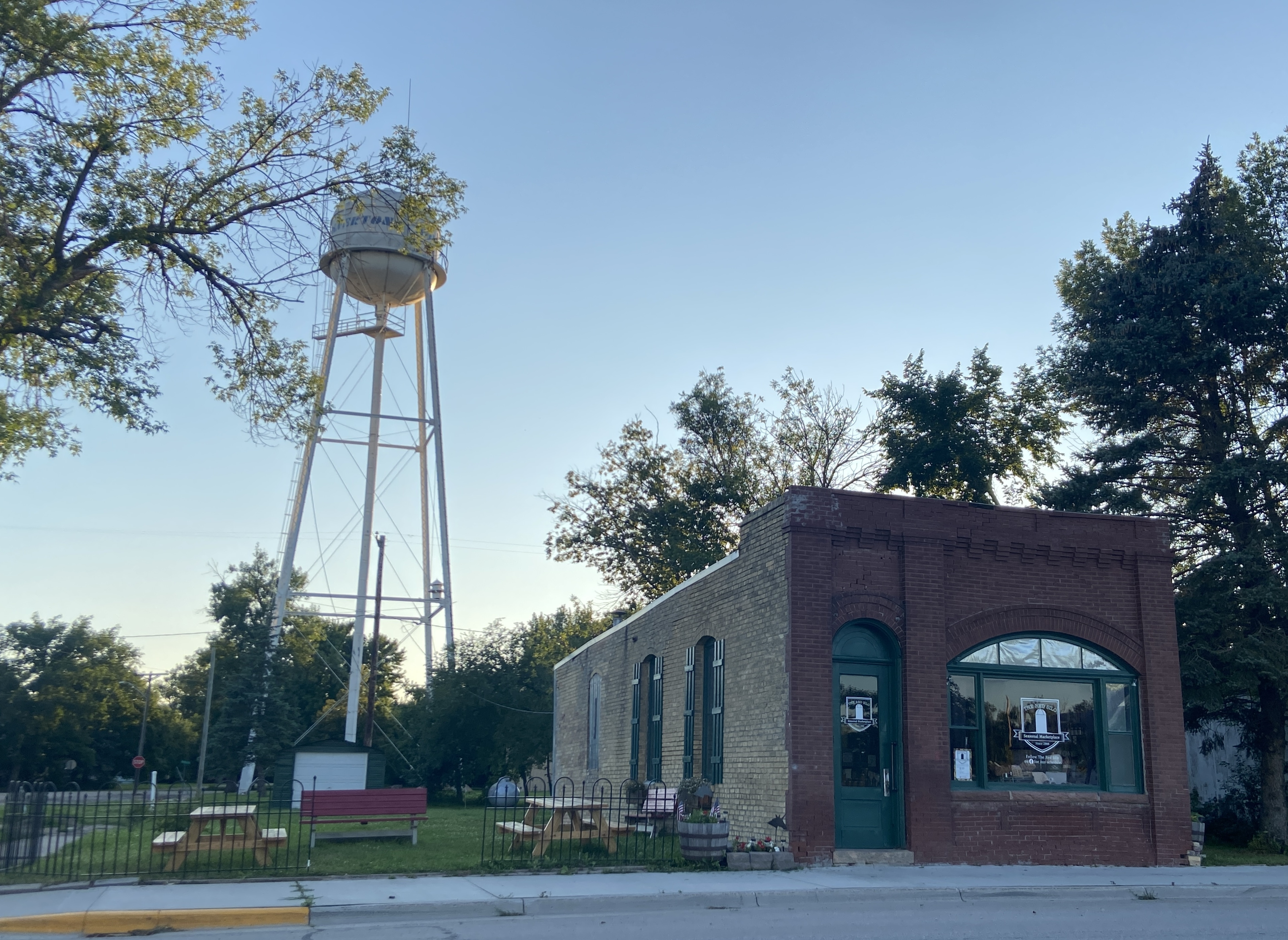
The Red Silo Marketplace

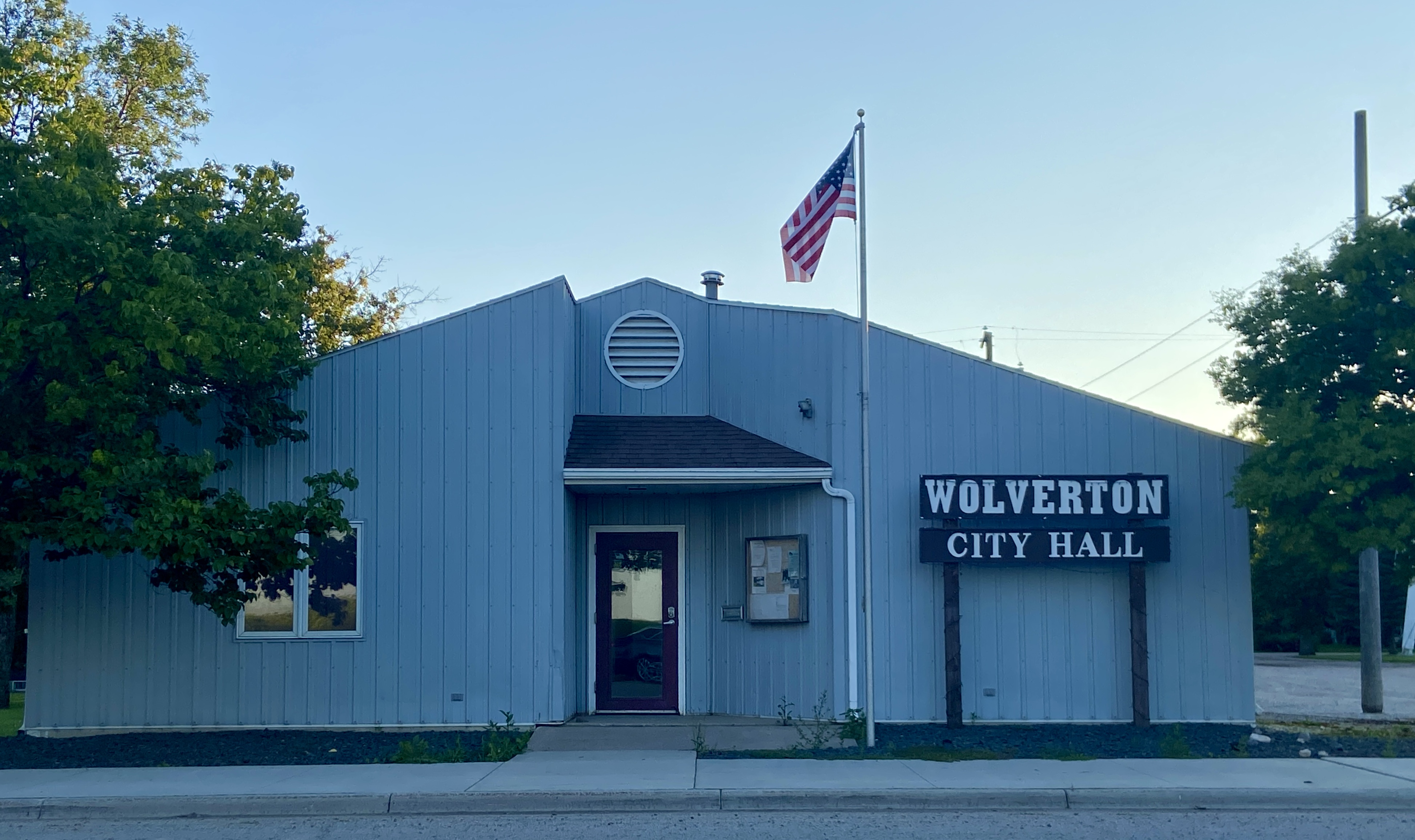
City Hall

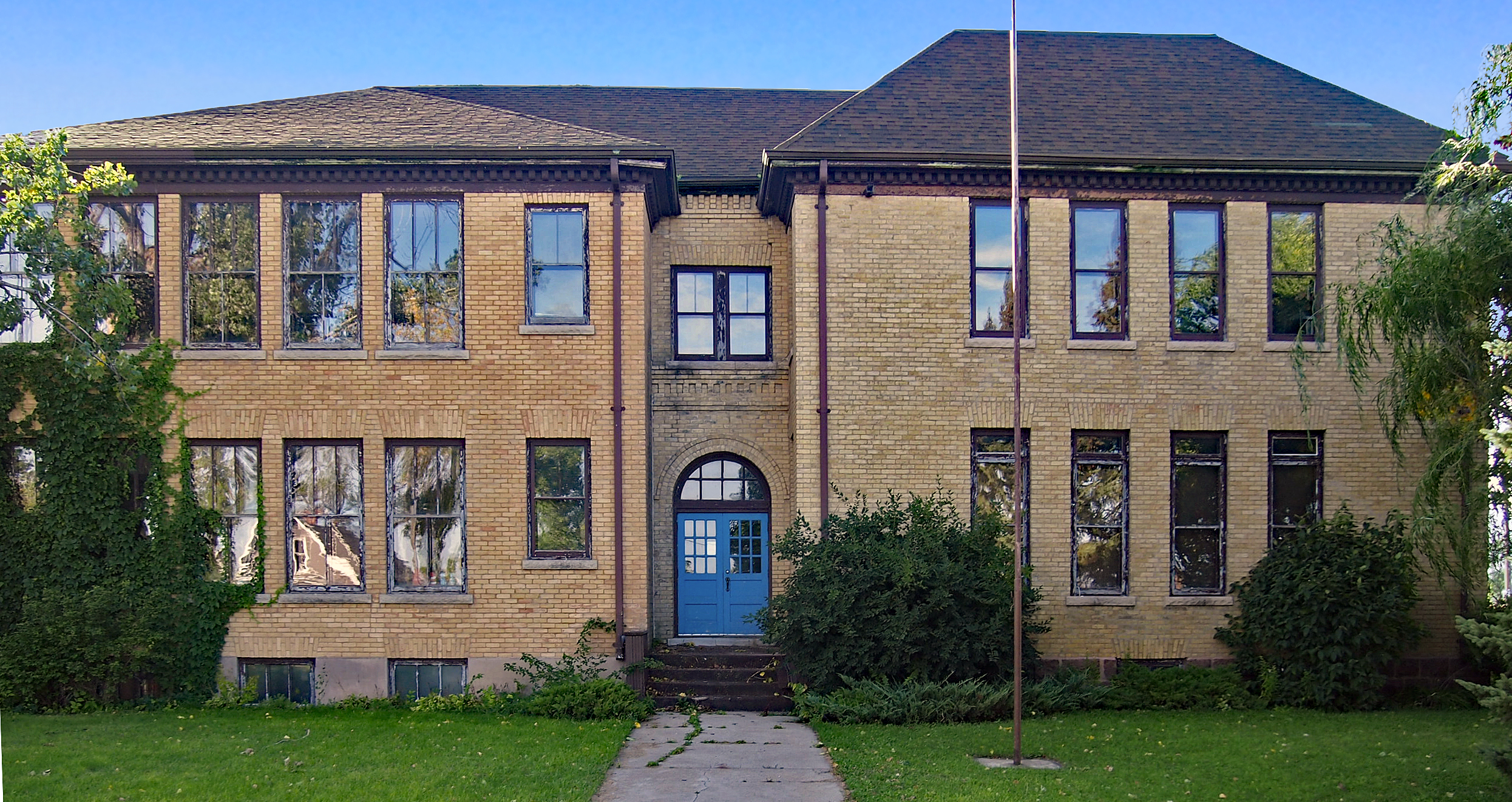
Wolverton Public School

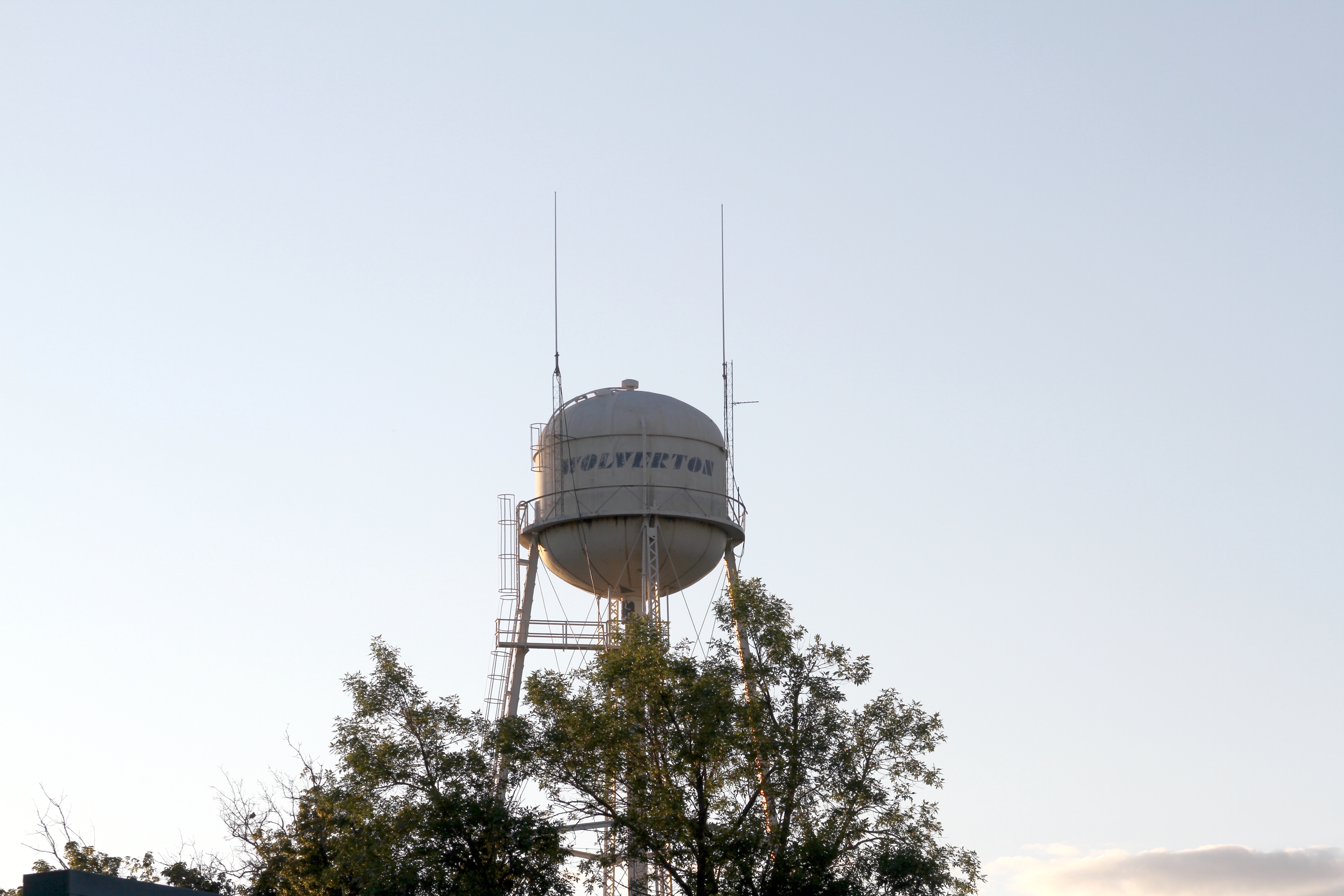
Water tower

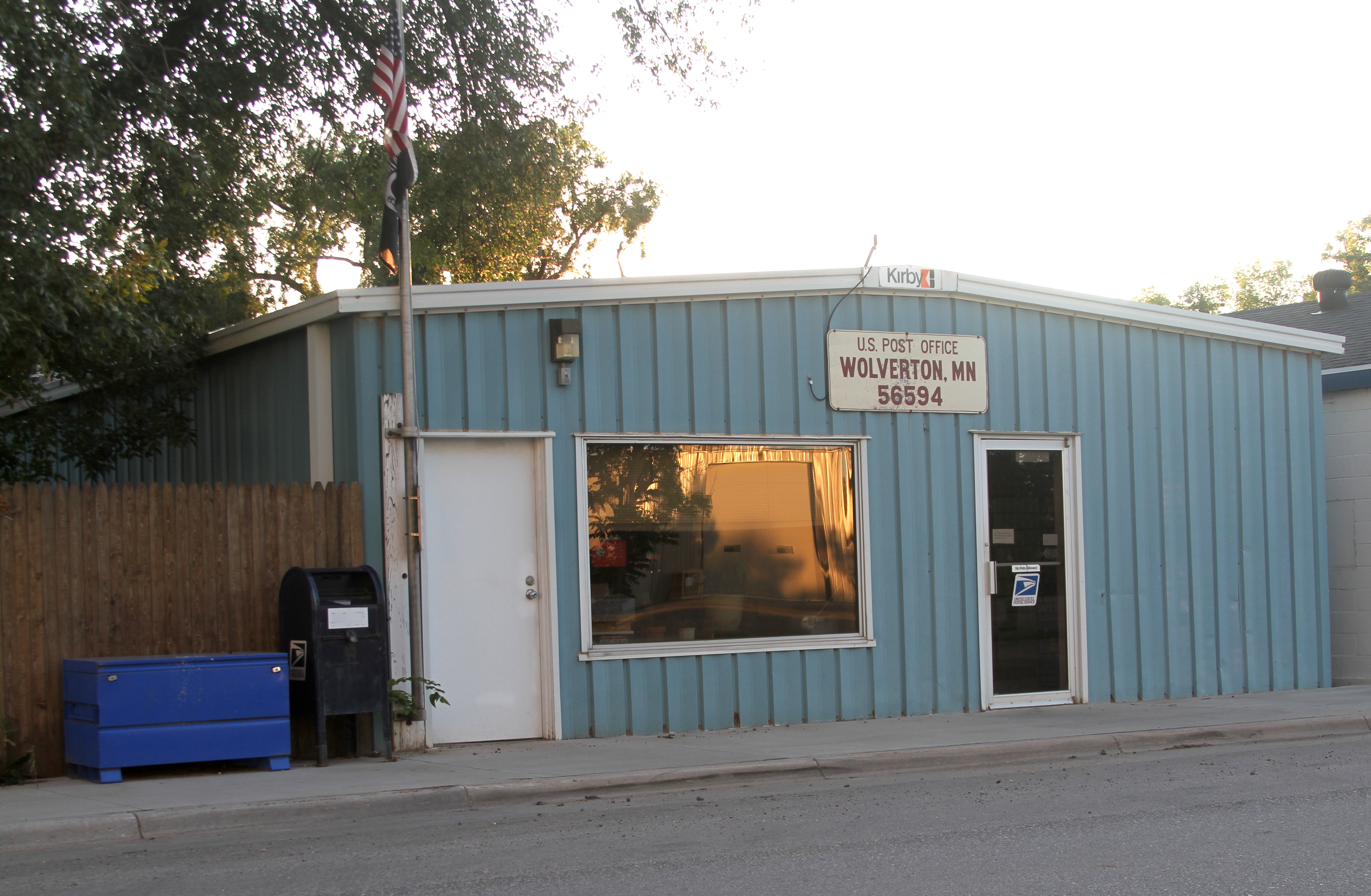
Post Office
