= Wolverton Public School =

- U.S. National Register of Historic Places
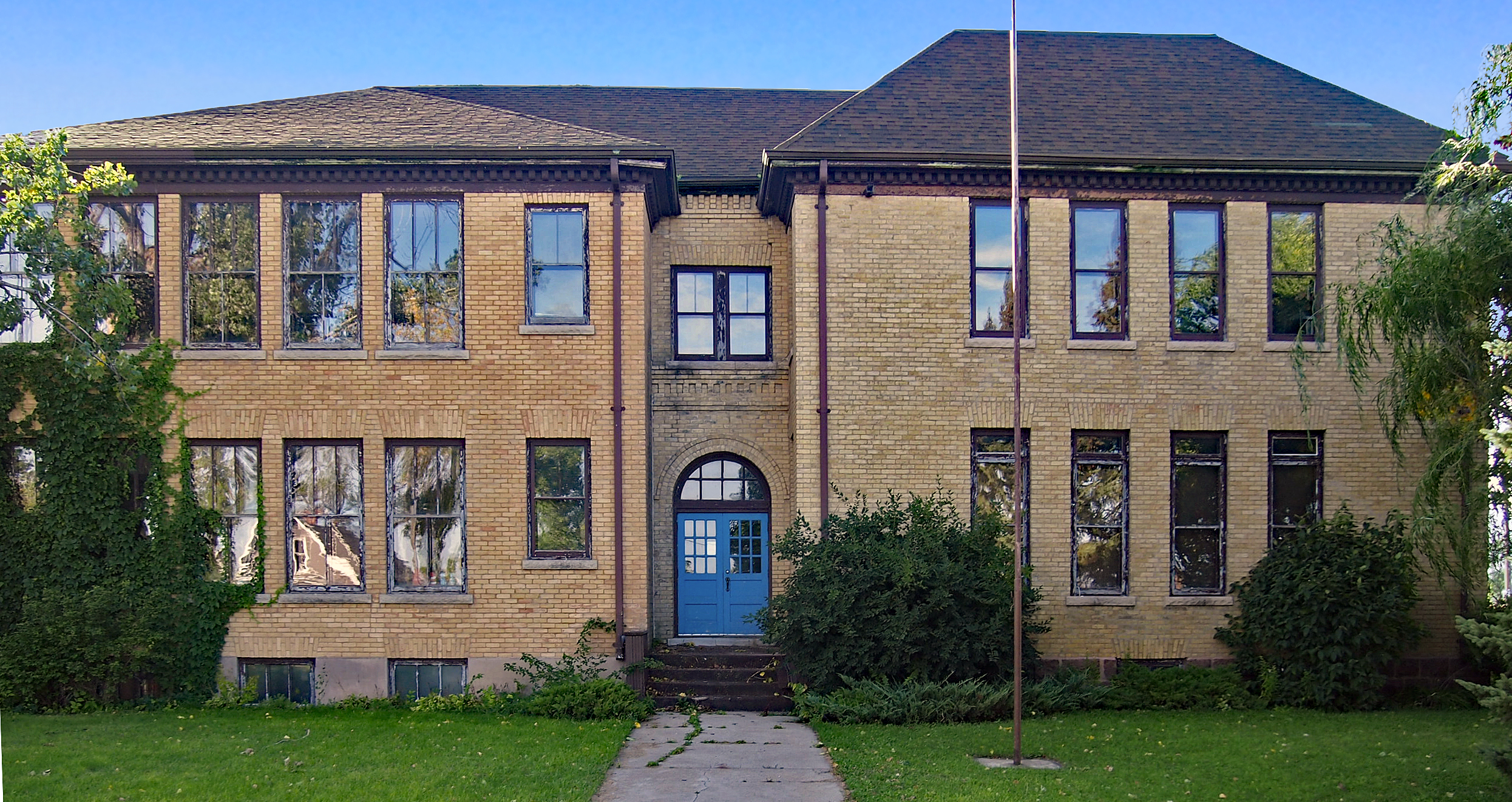
- Wolverton Public School viewed from the east

- Location within Minnesota Location within the United States
- Location: North 1st Street, Wolverton, Minnesota
- Coordinates: 46°33′55″N 96°44′8″W
- Area: Less than one acre
- Built: 1906, expanded 1917
- MPS: Wilkin County MRA
- NRHP reference No.: 80002188
- Designated: July 17, 1980

Wolverton Public School is a former school building in Wolverton, Minnesota, United States. It was constructed in 1906 and expanded in 1917. It closed in 1978. It was listed on the National Register of Historic Places in 1980 for its local significance in the themes of education and social history. It was nominated for being one of the more architecturally consistent examples of the era's schools built for expandability as populations increased.

== See also ==
- National Register of Historic Places listings in Wilkin County, Minnesota
