= Lee Township, Beltrami County, Minnesota =

Lee Township, Minnesota
- Township
- Location of Lee Township, within Beltrami County, Minnesota
- Coordinates: 48°14′44″N 95°31′7″W
- Country: United States
- State: Minnesota
- County: Beltrami

Area
  - Total: 36.4 sq mi (94.2 km^{2})
  - Land: 36.2 sq mi (93.7 km^{2})
  - Water: 0.19 sq mi (0.5 km^{2})
- Elevation: 1,198 ft (365 m)

Population (2020)
  - Total: 41
  - Density: 1.1/sq mi (0.44/km^{2})
- Time zone: UTC-6 (Central (CST))
  - Summer (DST): UTC-5 (CDT)
- FIPS code: 27-36170
- GNIS feature ID: 0664744

Lee Township is a township in Beltrami County, Minnesota, United States. The population was 41 as of the 2020 census.

Lee Township was named for a family of settlers of Norwegian descent, but the spelling of their surname has been anglicized.

== Geography ==
According to the United States Census Bureau, the township has a total area of 36.4 square miles (94 km^{2}), of which 36.2 square miles (94 km^{2}) is land and 0.2 square miles (0.52 km^{2}) (0.55%) is water.

=== Major highway ===
- Minnesota State Highway 89

=== Adjacent townships ===
- Benville Township (north)
- Spruce Grove Township (northeast)
- Hamre Township (east)
- Espelie Township, Marshall County (west)
- Valley Township, Marshall County (northwest)

=== Cemeteries ===
The township contains Bethesda Cemetery.

== Demographics ==
Historical population
| Census | Pop. | Note | %± |
|---|---|---|---|
| 1910 | 134 | | — |
| 1920 | 212 | | 58.2% |
| 1930 | 114 | | −46.2% |
| 1940 | 135 | | 18.4% |
| 1950 | 106 | | −21.5% |
| 1960 | 56 | | −47.2% |
| 1970 | 58 | | 3.6% |
| 1980 | 54 | | −6.9% |
| 1990 | 50 | | −7.4% |
| 2000 | 36 | | −28.0% |
| 2010 | 51 | | 41.7% |
| 2020 | 41 | | −19.6% |
U.S. Decennial Census

As of the census of 2000, there were 36 people, 15 households, and 10 families residing in the township. The population density was 1.0 inhabitant per square mile (0.39/km^{2}). There were 21 housing units at an average density of 0.6 per square mile (0.23/km^{2}). The racial makeup of the township was 100.00% White.

There were 15 households, out of which 40.0% had children under the age of 18 living with them, 60.0% were married couples living together, and 26.7% were non-families. 26.7% of all households were made up of individuals, and 13.3% had someone living alone who was 65 years of age or older. The average household size was 2.40 and the average family size was 2.82.

In the township the population was spread out, with 25.0% under the age of 18, 11.1% from 18 to 24, 22.2% from 25 to 44, 25.0% from 45 to 64, and 16.7% who were 65 years of age or older. The median age was 40 years. For every 100 females, there were 111.8 males. For every 100 females age 18 and over, there were 145.5 males.

The median income for a household in the township was $24,167, and the median income for a family was $25,000. Males had a median income of $15,000 versus $10,625 for females. The per capita income for the township was $8,370. There were no families and 5.4% of the population living below the poverty line, including no under eighteens and none of those over 64.
