= Saum, Minnesota =

Unincorporated community in Minnesota, United States

Saum
- Unincorporated community
- Location within Minnesota Location within the United States
- Coordinates: 47°58′29″N 94°40′37″W
- Country: United States
- State: Minnesota
- County: Beltrami
- Elevation: 1,197 ft (365 m)
- Time zone: UTC-6 (Central (CST))
  - Summer (DST): UTC-5 (CDT)
- Area code: 218
- GNIS feature ID: 654932

Saum is an unincorporated community in Beltrami County, Minnesota, United States.

== Notable person ==
- Leroy E. Matson, Minnesota Supreme Court justice, grew up on a farm in Saum.
