= Puposky, Minnesota =

Unincorporated community in Minnesota, United States

Puposky
- Unincorporated community
- Location within Minnesota Location within the United States
- Coordinates: 47.68°N 94.91°W
- Country: United States
- State: Minnesota
- County: Beltrami
- Elevation: 1,371 ft (418 m)
- Time zone: UTC-6 (Central (CST))
  - Summer (DST): UTC-5 (CDT)
- Area code: 218
- GNIS feature ID: 654894

Puposky is an unincorporated community in Durand Township, Beltrami County, Minnesota, United States. It lies at 47.68°N 94.91°W.

Puposky was officially founded on September 26, 1905. The railroad was coming through, and a Post Office also started that same year.

The town is three blocks long, has a post office (zip code 56667), a town hall, and a church (with cemetery).

== Population ==
The 2010 state census listed Durand Township's population at 175, with no specific information on the town of Puposky itself. The sign outside the town lists the population at 89, but this number has remained static for several decades and is arguably inaccurate. In 2011, local sources said the population has been as low as 37 residents in the past.

== Origin ==
Puposky's name is derived from an Ojibwe word which means "shaking ground" referring to the swampy terrain.
