= Enstrom Township, Roseau County, Minnesota =

Township in Minnesota, United States

Enstrom Township, Minnesota
- Township
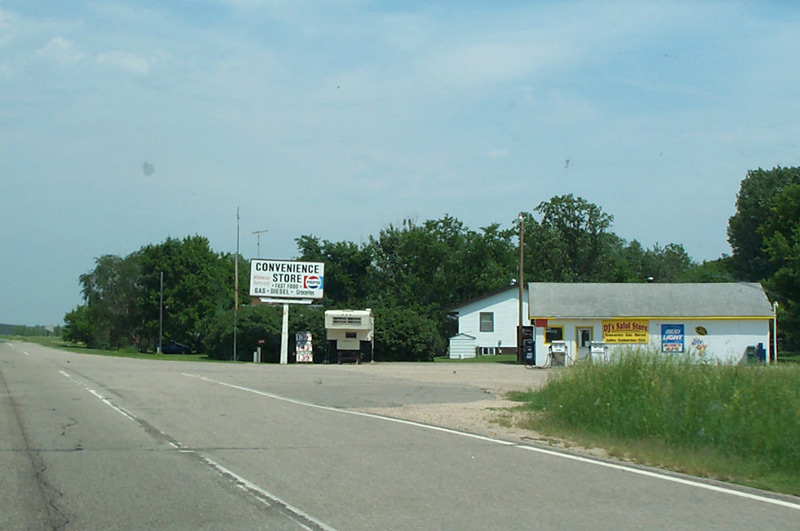
- Store in Salol, a community in Enstrom Township

- Location of Enstrom Township, within Roseau County, Minnesota
- Coordinates: 48°51′51″N 95°32′16″W
- Country: United States
- State: Minnesota
- County: Roseau

Area
  - Total: 36.0 sq mi (93.2 km^{2})
  - Land: 36.0 sq mi (93.2 km^{2})
  - Water: 0 sq mi (0.0 km^{2})
- Elevation: 1,076 ft (328 m)

Population (2020)
  - Total: 418
  - Density: 11.6/sq mi (4.48/km^{2})
- Time zone: UTC-6 (Central (CST))
  - Summer (DST): UTC-5 (CDT)
- FIPS code: 27-19466
- GNIS feature ID: 0664100

Enstrom Township is a township in Roseau County, Minnesota, United States. The population was 418 at the 2020 census.

The unincorporated community of Salol is located within Enstrom Township.

Enstrom Township was named for Louis Enstrom, a Swedish settler.

== Geography ==
According to the United States Census Bureau, the township has a total area of 36.0 square miles (93 km^{2}), of which 36.0 square miles (93 km^{2}) is land and 0.03% is water.

== Demographics ==
As of the census of 2000, there were 580 people, 209 households, and 159 families residing in the township. The population density was 16.1 inhabitants per square mile (6.2/km^{2}). There were 249 housing units at an average density of 6.9 per square mile (2.7/km^{2}). The racial makeup of the township was 96.55% White, 1.55% Native American, 1.21% Asian, 0.52% from other races, and 0.17% from two or more races. Hispanic or Latino of any race were 0.69% of the population.

There were 209 households, out of which 47.8% had children under the age of 18 living with them, 59.8% were married couples living together, 7.2% had a female householder with no husband present, and 23.9% were non-families. 19.1% of all households were made up of individuals, and 4.8% had someone living alone who was 65 years of age or older. The average household size was 2.78 and the average family size was 3.18.

In the township the population was spread out, with 34.7% under the age of 18, 5.9% from 18 to 24, 39.1% from 25 to 44, 12.6% from 45 to 64, and 7.8% who were 65 years of age or older. The median age was 29 years. For every 100 females, there were 107.1 males. For every 100 females age 18 and over, there were 117.8 males.

The median income for a household in the township was $45,972, and the median income for a family was $48,750. Males had a median income of $30,852 versus $22,426 for females. The per capita income for the township was $15,544. About 5.3% of families and 8.1% of the population were below the poverty line, including 12.6% of those under age 18 and none of those age 65 or over.
