= Tenstrike, Minnesota =

City in Minnesota, United States

Tenstrike
- City
- Location of Tenstrike, Minnesota
- Coordinates: 47°39′40″N 94°40′51″W
- Country: United States
- State: Minnesota
- County: Beltrami

Area
  - Total: 4.50 sq mi (11.66 km^{2})
  - Land: 3.31 sq mi (8.57 km^{2})
  - Water: 1.19 sq mi (3.09 km^{2})
- Elevation: 1,421 ft (433 m)

Population (2020)
  - Total: 186
  - Density: 56.2/sq mi (21.71/km^{2})
- Time zone: UTC-6 (Central (CST))
  - Summer (DST): UTC-5 (CDT)
- ZIP code: 56683
- Area code: 218
- FIPS code: 27-64444
- GNIS feature ID: 0658635

Tenstrike is a city in Beltrami County, Minnesota, United States. As of the 2020 census, Tenstrike had a population of 186. It is 21 miles northeast of Bemidji.

== History ==
A post office called Tenstrike has been in operation since 1899.

== Geography ==
According to the United States Census Bureau, the city has a total area of 4.47 square miles (11.58 km^{2}), of which 3.26 square miles (8.44 km^{2}) is land and 1.21 square miles (3.13 km^{2}) is water.

== Demographics ==
Historical population
Census	Pop.	Note	%±
1910	250		—
1920	235		−6.0%
1930	201		−14.5%
1940	239		18.9%
1950	206		−13.8%
1960	147		−28.6%
1970	138		−6.1%
1980	159		15.2%
1990	184		15.7%
2000	195		6.0%
2010	201		3.1%
2020	186		−7.5%
U.S. Decennial Census

=== 2010 census ===
As of the census of 2010, there were 201 people, 82 households, and 59 families living in the city. The population density was 61.7 inhabitants per square mile (23.8/km^{2}). There were 121 housing units at an average density of 37.1 per square mile (14.3/km^{2}). The racial makeup of the city was 95.0% White, 3.5% Native American, and 1.5% from two or more races.

There were 82 households, of which 34.1% had children under the age of 18 living with them, 58.5% were married couples living together, 3.7% had a female householder with no husband present, 9.8% had a male householder with no wife present, and 28.0% were non-families. 24.4% of all households were made up of individuals, and 10.9% had someone living alone who was 65 years of age or older. The average household size was 2.45 and the average family size was 2.86.

The median age in the city was 42.5 years. 23.9% of residents were under the age of 18; 6.6% were between the ages of 18 and 24; 22.5% were from 25 to 44; 31.4% were from 45 to 64; and 15.9% were 65 years of age or older. The gender makeup of the city was 55.2% male and 44.8% female.

=== 2000 census ===
As of the census of 2000, there were 195 people, 83 households, and 52 families living in the city. The population density was 59.5 inhabitants per square mile (23.0/km^{2}). There were 110 housing units at an average density of 33.6 per square mile (13.0/km^{2}). The racial makeup of the city was 95.38% White, 3.59% Native American, 0.51% from other races, and 0.51% from two or more races. Hispanic or Latino of any race were 1.03% of the population.

There were 83 households, of which 27.7% had children under the age of 18 living with them, 56.6% were married couples living together, 4.8% had a female householder with no husband present, and 37.3% were non-families. 32.5% of all households were made up of individuals, and 13.3% had someone living alone who was 65 years of age or older. The average household size was 2.35 and the average family size was 3.06.

In the city, the population was spread out, with 26.7% under the age of 18, 4.6% from 18 to 24, 31.8% from 25 to 44, 24.6% from 45 to 64, and 12.3% who were 65 years of age or older. The median age was 39 years. For every 100 females, there were 99.0 males. For every 100 females age 18 and over, there were 98.6 males.

The median income for a household in the city was $35,000, and the median income for a family was $48,750. Males had a median income of $27,917 versus $23,125 for females. The per capita income for the city was $18,415. About 6.7% of families and 8.9% of the population were below the poverty line, including 5.3% of those under the age of eighteen and 13.8% of those 65 or over.
