= Shotley Brook =

Stream in Beltrami County, Minnesota, U.S.

Coordinates: 48°05′24″N 94°36′22″W

Shotley Brook is a stream in Beltrami County, Minnesota, in the United States.

Shotley Brook was likely named for a pioneer lumberman.

== See also ==
- List of rivers of Minnesota
