= Woodrow Township, Beltrami County, Minnesota =

Woodrow Township, Minnesota
- Township
- Location of Woodrow Township, within Beltrami County, Minnesota
- Coordinates: 47°58′43″N 94°36′54″W
- Country: United States
- State: Minnesota
- County: Beltrami

Area
  - Total: 35.9 sq mi (93.1 km^{2})
  - Land: 35.9 sq mi (93.1 km^{2})
  - Water: 0 sq mi (0.0 km^{2})
- Elevation: 1,217 ft (371 m)

Population (2020)
  - Total: 83
  - Density: 2.3/sq mi (0.89/km^{2})
- Time zone: UTC-6 (Central (CST))
  - Summer (DST): UTC-5 (CDT)
- FIPS code: 27-71590
- GNIS feature ID: 0666044

Woodrow Township is a township in Beltrami County, Minnesota, United States. The population was 83 as of the 2020 census.

== History ==
Woodrow Township was named for Woodrow Wilson, 28th President of the United States.

== Geography ==
According to the United States Census Bureau, the township has a total area of 35.9 square miles (93.1 km^{2}), all land.

=== Adjacent townships ===
- Shotley Township (north)
- Kelliher Township (east)
- Shooks Township (southeast)
- Cormant Township (south)
- Quiring Township (southwest)
- Battle Township (west)

=== Cemeteries ===
The township contains Foy Cemetery.

== Demographics ==
Historical population
Census	Pop.	Note	%±
1920	242		—
1930	189		−21.9%
1940	227		20.1%
1950	185		−18.5%
1960	129		−30.3%
1970	82		−36.4%
1980	83		1.2%
1990	97		16.9%
2000	74		−23.7%
2010	73		−1.4%
2020	83		13.7%
U.S. Decennial Census

As of the census of 2000, there were 74 people, 30 households, and 18 families residing in the township. The population density was 2.1 people per square mile (0.8/km^{2}). There were 49 housing units at an average density of 1.4/sq mi (0.5/km^{2}). The racial makeup of the township was 98.65% White and 1.35% Native American.

There were 30 households, out of which 30.0% had children under the age of 18 living with them, 60.0% were married couples living together, 3.3% had a female householder with no husband present, and 36.7% were non-families. 30.0% of all households were made up of individuals, and 20.0% had someone living alone who was 65 years of age or older. The average household size was 2.47 and the average family size was 3.16.

In the township the population was spread out, with 25.7% under the age of 18, 4.1% from 18 to 24, 20.3% from 25 to 44, 37.8% from 45 to 64, and 12.2% who were 65 years of age or older. The median age was 45 years. For every 100 females, there were 131.3 males. For every 100 females age 18 and over, there were 120.0 males.

The median income for a household in the township was $15,250, and the median income for a family was $17,083. Males had a median income of $18,750 versus $11,250 for females. The per capita income for the township was $8,540. There were 52.4% of families and 59.5% of the population living below the poverty line, including 96.3% of under eighteens and 30.8% of those over 64.
