= Frank Moe =

American politician and educator (1965–2022)

Frank R. Moe (October 21, 1965 – January 12, 2022) was an American politician and educator.

Moe was born in Bloomington, Minnesota and graduated from Jefferson High School in Bloomington. He received his bachelor's degree in history from Carleton College and his master's degree in physical education from the University of North Carolina. Moe also took graduate courses in education at the University of Minnesota. Moe lived in Bemidji, Minnesota with his wife and taught at Bemidji State University. Moe served in the Minnesota House of Representatives from 2005 to 2009 as a member of the Minnesota Democratic-Farmer-Labor party. Moe later moved to Grand Marais, Minnesota, with his wife, and was a sled dog owner and racer. He died from brain cancer in Grand Marias, Minnesota, on January 12, 2022, at the age of 56.
