= Kelliher, Minnesota =

Town in Minnesota, United States

Kelliher
- City
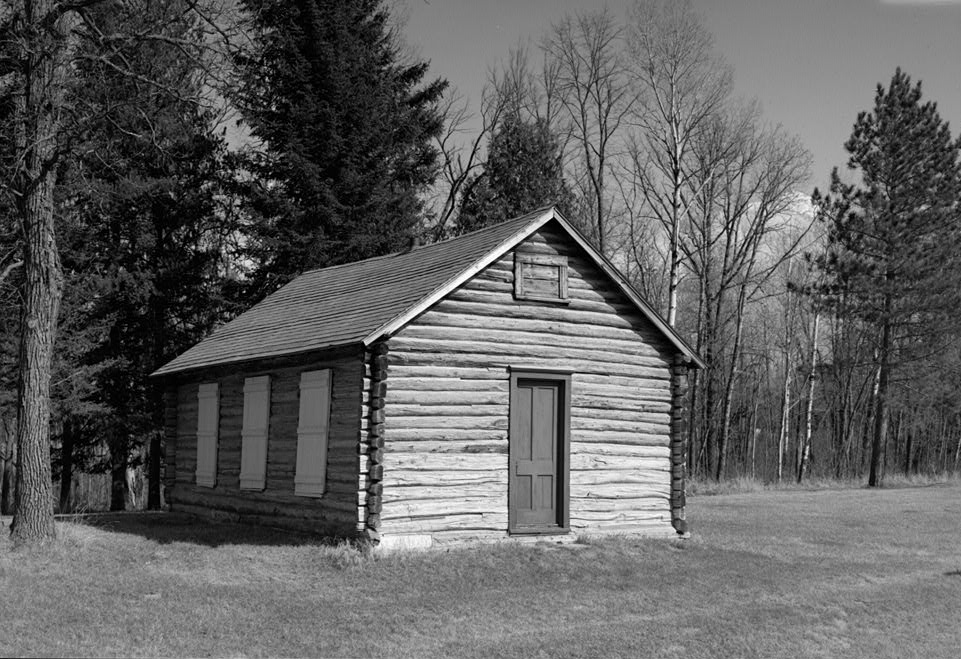
- Motto: "Gateway To Upper Red Lake"
- Location of Kelliher, Minnesota
- Coordinates: 47°56′34″N 94°26′58″W
- Country: United States
- State: Minnesota
- County: Beltrami
- Established: 1892
- Incorporated (village): October 3, 1903

Area
  - Total: 2.26 sq mi (5.86 km^{2})
  - Land: 2.20 sq mi (5.70 km^{2})
  - Water: 0.062 sq mi (0.16 km^{2})
- Elevation: 1,358 ft (414 m)

Population (2020)
  - Total: 258
  - Estimate (2021): 256
  - Density: 117.2/sq mi (45.27/km^{2})
- Time zone: UTC-6 (CST)
  - Summer (DST): UTC-5 (CDT)
- ZIP code: 56650
- Area code: 218
- FIPS code: 27-32606
- GNIS feature ID: 0656866
- Website: kelliher.govoffice.com

Kelliher (/ˈkɛliər/ KEL-ee-ər) is a city in Beltrami County, Minnesota, United States. The population was 258 at the 2020 census. Minnesota State Highway 72 is the main route through Kelliher.

Kelliher was named for A. O. Kelliher, a businessman in the lumber industry.

== Geography ==
According to the United States Census Bureau, the town has an area of 2.14 square miles (5.54 km^{2}), of which 2.08 square miles (5.39 km^{2}) is land and 0.06 square miles (0.16 km^{2}) is water.

== Demographics ==
Historical population
| Census | Pop. | Note | %± |
|---|---|---|---|
| 1910 | 294 | | — |
| 1920 | 514 | | 74.8% |
| 1930 | 370 | | −28.0% |
| 1940 | 357 | | −3.5% |
| 1950 | 336 | | −5.9% |
| 1960 | 297 | | −11.6% |
| 1970 | 289 | | −2.7% |
| 1980 | 324 | | 12.1% |
| 1990 | 348 | | 7.4% |
| 2000 | 294 | | −15.5% |
| 2010 | 262 | | −10.9% |
| 2020 | 258 | | −1.5% |
| 2021 (est.) | 256 | | −0.8% |
U.S. Decennial Census; 2020 Census

=== 2010 census ===
As of the census of 2010, there were 262 people, 122 households, and 67 families living in the town. The population density was 126.0 inhabitants per square mile (48.6/km^{2}). There were 194 housing units at an average density of 93.3 per square mile (36.0/km^{2}). The racial makeup of the town was 92.7% White, 5.3% Native American, 0.4% Asian, 1.1% from other races, and 0.4% from two or more races. Hispanic or Latino of any race were 1.9% of the population.

There were 122 households, of which 24.6% had children under the age of 18 living with them, 45.1% were married couples living together, 6.6% had a female householder with no husband present, 3.3% had a male householder with no wife present, and 45.1% were non-families. 41.0% of all households were made up of individuals, and 27.9% had someone living alone who was 65 years of age or older. The average household size was 2.15 and the average family size was 2.99.

The median age in the town was 46.3 years. 23.7% of residents were under the age of 18; 4.5% were between the ages of 18 and 24; 19.8% were from 25 to 44; 29.1% were from 45 to 64; and 22.9% were 65 years of age or older. The gender makeup of the town was 48.5% male and 51.5% female.

=== 2000 census ===
As of the census of 2000, there were 294 people, 121 households, and 61 families living in the town. The population density was 140.9 inhabitants per square mile (54.4/km^{2}). There were 140 housing units at an average density of 67.1 per square mile (25.9/km^{2}). The racial makeup of the town was 92.5% White, 6.1% Native American, and 1.4% from two or more races.

There were 121 households, of which 30.6% had children under 18 living with them, 38.0% were married couples living together, 9.1% had a female householder with no husband present, and 48.8% were non-families. 47.9% of all households were made up of individuals, and 29.8% had someone living alone who was 65 or older. The average household size was 2.19 and the average family size was 3.26.

In the town, the population was spread out, with 27.9% under 18, 4.1% from 18 to 24, 19.0% from 25 to 44, 22.4% from 45 to 64, and 26.5% who were 65 or older. The median age was 43. For every 100 females, there were 81.5 males. For every 100 females 18 and over, there were 76.7 males.

The median income for a household in the town was $20,625, and the median income for a family was $33,958. Males had a median income of $30,313 versus $16,875 for females. The per capita income was $13,386. About 12.7% of families and 19.6% of the population were below the poverty line, including 20.0% of those under 18 and 23.2% of those 65 or over.
