= Pennington, Minnesota =

Unincorporated community in Minnesota, United States

Pennington
- Unincorporated community
- Location within Minnesota Location within the United States
- Coordinates: 47°29′01″N 94°28′48″W
- Country: United States
- State: Minnesota
- County: Beltrami
- Elevation: 1,319 ft (402 m)
- Time zone: UTC-6 (Central (CST))
  - Summer (DST): UTC-5 (CDT)
- ZIP code: 56663
- Area code: 218
- GNIS feature ID: 657774

Pennington, also called Cass River, is an unincorporated community in Beltrami County, Minnesota, United States. Pennington is 9.5 miles (15.3 km) northeast of Cass Lake. Pennington has a post office with ZIP code 56663.
