= Beltrami County, Minnesota =

County in Minnesota, United States

- County
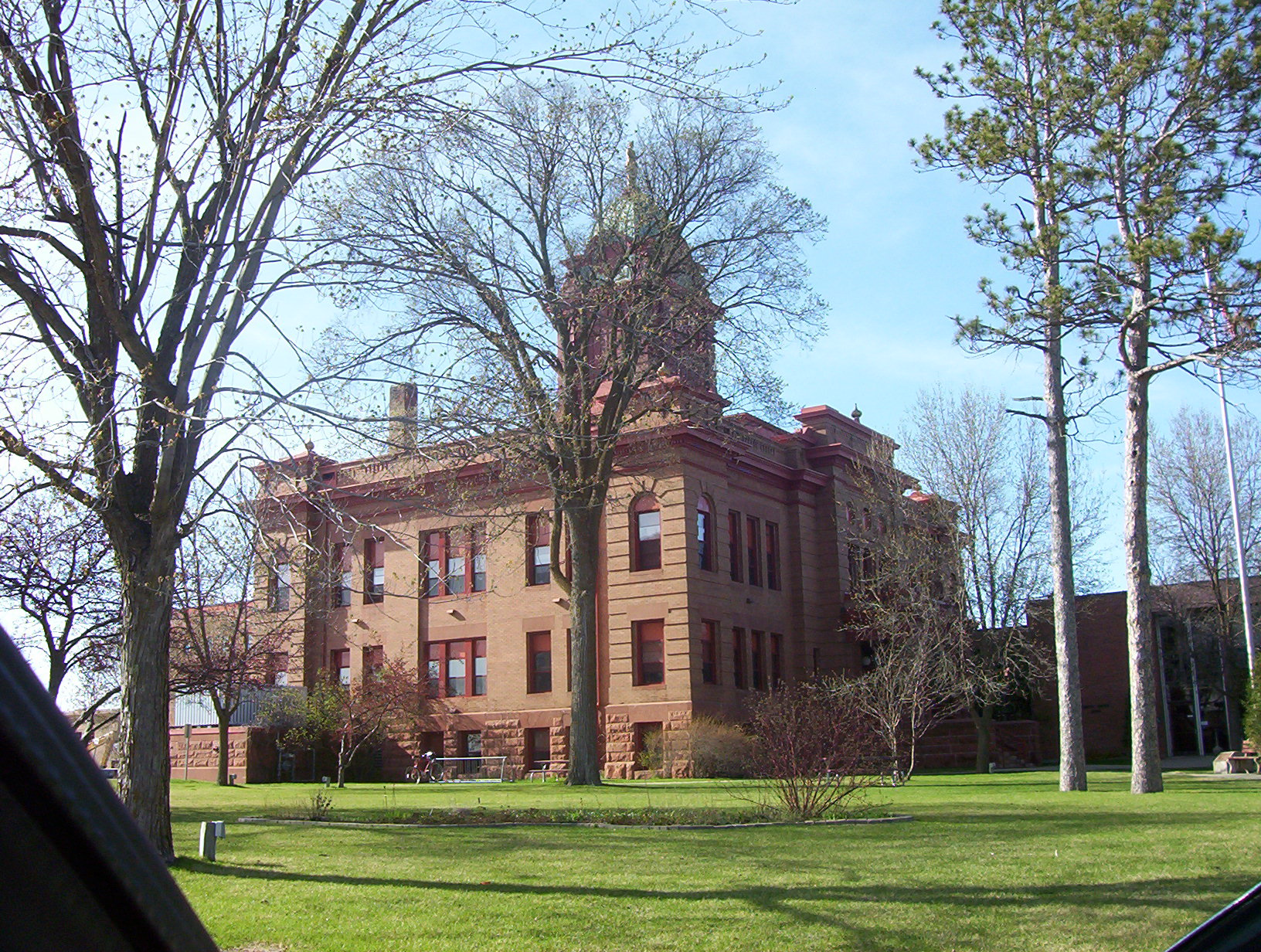
- Beltrami County Courthouse

- Location within the U.S. state of Minnesota
- Coordinates: 48°01′N 94°55′W
- Country: United States
- State: Minnesota
- Founded: February 28, 1866 (created); 1896 (organized)
- Named for: Giacomo Costantino Beltrami
- Seat: Bemidji
- Largest city: Bemidji

Area
  - Total: 3,056 sq mi (7,920 km^{2})
  - Land: 2,505 sq mi (6,490 km^{2})
  - Water: 551 sq mi (1,430 km^{2}) 18%

Population (2020)
  - Total: 46,228
  - Estimate (2025): 47,055 ▲
  - Density: 18.6/sq mi (7.2/km^{2})
- Time zone: UTC−6 (Central)
  - Summer (DST): UTC−5 (CDT)
- Congressional districts: 7th, 8th
- Website: www.co.beltrami.mn.us

Beltrami County (/bɛlˈtræmi/ bel-TRAM-ee) is a county in the northern part of the U.S. state of Minnesota. As of the 2020 census, the population was 46,228. Its county seat is Bemidji. The county's name comes from Italian adventurer Giacomo Beltrami from Bergamo, who explored the area in 1825. The county was created in 1866 and organized in 1896.

Beltrami County comprises the Bemidji, MN Micropolitan Statistical Area.

Portions of the Leech Lake and Red Lake Indian reservations are in the county. The northernmost portion of the Mississippi River flows through the southern part of the county, through Bemidji. Beltrami, Renville, and Stearns are Minnesota's only counties that abut nine other counties.

== Geography ==
Beltrami County's southwest corner is considered part of the headwaters of the Mississippi River, which flows easterly and northeasterly from Lake Itasca through the southern part of the county. Much of the middle and upper county is taken up with the two sections of Red Lake. The county terrain consists of rolling low tree-covered hills, dotted with lakes and ponds. The terrain slopes to the east and north. Its highest point is a small hill 1.3 miles (2.1 km) northwest of Wolf Lake, at 1,511 ft (461 m) ASL; otherwise the terrain high point is near its southwest corner, at 1,457 ft (444 m) ASL. The county has a total area of 3,056 square miles (7,920 km^{2}), of which 2,505 square miles (6,490 km^{2}) is land and 551 square miles (1,430 km^{2}) (18%) is water. It is the fourth-largest county in Minnesota by area.

=== Major highways ===
- U.S. Highway 2
- U.S. Highway 71
- Minnesota State Highway 1
- Minnesota State Highway 72
- Minnesota State Highway 89
- Minnesota State Highway 197

=== Adjacent counties ===
- Lake of the Woods County - north
- Koochiching County - northeast
- Itasca County - east
- Cass County - southeast
- Hubbard County - south
- Clearwater County - southwest
- Pennington County - west
- Marshall County - west
- Roseau County - northwest

=== Protected areas ===
- Bagley Lake State Wildlife Management Area (part)
- Buena Vista State Forest
- Chippewa National Forest (part)
- Lake Bemidji State Park
- Long Lake State Wildlife Management Area
- Mississippi Headwaters State Forest (part)
- Pine Island State Forest (part)
- Red Lake Peatland Scientific and Natural Area (part)
- Three Island Lake County Park

== Climate and weather ==
Bemidji, Minnesota

Climate chart (precipitation, max. and min. temperature)
J	F	M	A	M	J	J	A	S	O	N	D
0.7 16 −4	0.6 24 3	0.9 36 16	1.5 53 30	2.7 67 43	4.1 75 52	4.3 79 57	3.5 77 55	2.8 66 45	2.3 54 35	1.1 34 19	0.6 21 3
- █ Average max. and min. temperatures in °F
- █ Precipitation totals in inches
- Source: The Weather Channel
Metric conversion
J	F	M	A	M	J	J	A	S	O	N	D
18 −9 −20	15 −4 −16	22 2 −9	39 12 −1	68 19 6	104 24 11	110 26 14	89 25 13	70 19 7	57 12 2	28 1 −7	16 −6 −16
- █ Average max. and min. temperatures in °C
- █ Precipitation totals in mm

In recent years, average temperatures in the county seat of Bemidji have ranged from a low of −4 °F (−20 °C) in January to a high of 79 °F (26 °C) in July, although a record low of −50 °F (−46 °C) was recorded in January 1950 and a record high of 101 °F (38 °C) was recorded in July 1975. Average monthly precipitation ranged from 0.59 inches (15 mm) in February to 4.33 inches (110 mm) in July.

== Demographics ==
Historical population
Census	Pop.	Note	%±
1870	80		—
1880	10		−87.5%
1890	312		3,020.0%
1900	11,030		3,435.3%
1910	19,337		75.3%
1920	27,079		40.0%
1930	20,707		−23.5%
1940	26,107		26.1%
1950	24,962		−4.4%
1960	23,425		−6.2%
1970	26,373		12.6%
1980	30,982		17.5%
1990	34,384		11.0%
2000	39,650		15.3%
2010	44,442		12.1%
2020	46,228		4.0%
2025 (est.)	47,055	▲	1.8%
U.S. Decennial Census; 1790-1960 1900-1990; 1990-2000

=== Racial and ethnic composition ===
Beltrami County, Minnesota – Racial and ethnic composition Note: the US Census treats Hispanic/Latino as an ethnic category. This table excludes Latinos from the racial categories and assigns them to a separate category. Hispanics/Latinos may be of any race.
Race / Ethnicity (NH = Non-Hispanic)	Pop 1980	Pop 1990	Pop 2000	Pop 2010	Pop 2020	% 1980	% 1990	% 2000	% 2010	% 2020
White alone (NH)	26,759	28,337	30,243	33,066	32,445	86.37%	82.41%	76.27%	74.40%	70.18%
Black or African American alone (NH)	37	98	139	251	519	0.12%	0.29%	0.35%	0.56%	1.12%
Native American or Alaska Native alone (NH)	3,917	5,604	7,940	8,821	9,198	12.64%	16.30%	20.03%	19.85%	19.90%
Asian alone (NH)	51	194	223	304	268	0.16%	0.56%	0.56%	0.68%	0.58%
Native Hawaiian or Pacific Islander alone (NH)	x	x	5	18	15	x	x	0.01%	0.04%	0.03%
Other race alone (NH)	88	5	21	17	134	0.28%	0.01%	0.05%	0.04%	0.29%
Mixed race or Multiracial (NH)	x	x	685	1,289	2,541	x	x	1.73%	2.90%	5.50%
Hispanic or Latino (any race)	130	146	394	676	1,108	0.42%	0.42%	0.99%	1.52%	2.40%
Total	30,982	34,384	39,650	44,442	46,228	100.00%	100.00%	100.00%	100.00%	100.00%

=== 2020 census ===
As of the 2020 census, the county had a population of 46,228. The median age was 35.6 years. 24.8% of residents were under the age of 18 and 17.2% of residents were 65 years of age or older. For every 100 females there were 99.2 males, and for every 100 females age 18 and over there were 97.0 males age 18 and over.

The racial makeup of the county was 70.9% White, 1.2% Black or African American, 20.4% American Indian and Alaska Native, 0.6% Asian, <0.1% Native Hawaiian and Pacific Islander, 0.6% from some other race, and 6.3% from two or more races. Hispanic or Latino residents of any race comprised 2.4% of the population.

32.1% of residents lived in urban areas, while 67.9% lived in rural areas.

There were 17,678 households in the county, of which 29.1% had children under the age of 18 living in them. Of all households, 42.8% were married-couple households, 20.7% were households with a male householder and no spouse or partner present, and 27.1% were households with a female householder and no spouse or partner present. About 29.6% of all households were made up of individuals and 11.6% had someone living alone who was 65 years of age or older.

There were 21,271 housing units, of which 16.9% were vacant. Among occupied housing units, 68.1% were owner-occupied and 31.9% were renter-occupied. The homeowner vacancy rate was 1.2% and the rental vacancy rate was 6.3%.

=== 2000 census ===
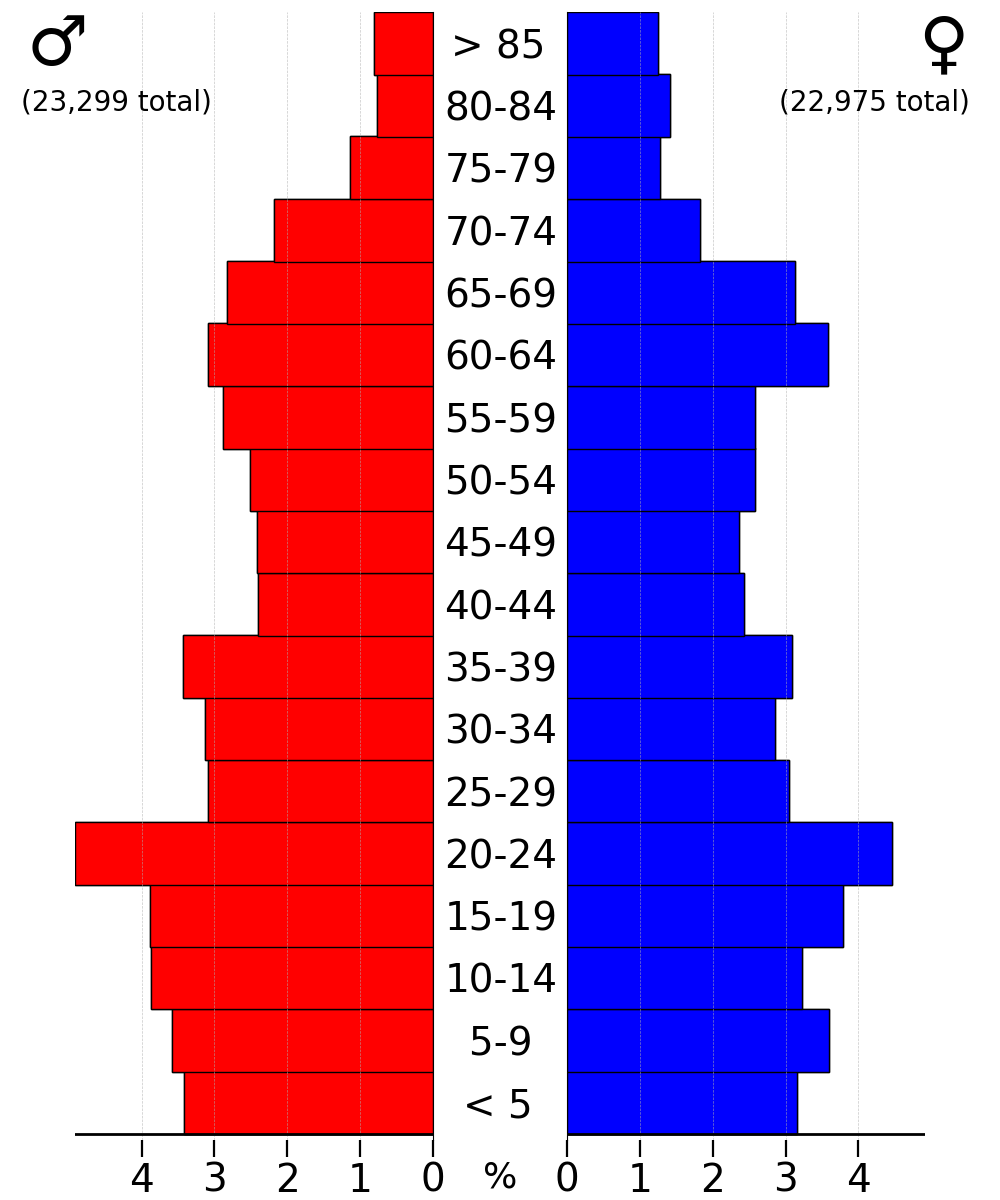
2022 US Census population pyramid for Beltrami County, from ACS 5-year estimates

As of the census of 2000, there were 39,650 people, 14,337 households, and 9,749 families in the county. The population density was 15.8 per square mile (6.1/km^{2}). There were 16,989 housing units at an average density of 6.78 per square mile (2.62/km^{2}). The racial makeup of the county was 76.66% White, 0.36% Black or African American, 20.36% Native American, 0.57% Asian, 0.02% Pacific Islander, 0.21% from other races, and 1.84% from two or more races. 0.99% of the population were Hispanic or Latino of any race. 21.6% were of German, 19.7% Norwegian and 5.6% Swedish ancestry. 95.1% spoke English and 2.4% Ojibwa as their first language.

There were 14,337 households, out of which 34.60% had children under the age of 18 living with them, 49.30% were married couples living together, 13.60% had a female householder with no husband present, and 32.00% were non-families. 24.80% of all households were made up of individuals, and 9.50% had someone living alone who was 65 years of age or older. The average household size was 2.63 and the average family size was 3.13.

The county population contained 28.70% under the age of 18, 13.90% from 18 to 24, 25.20% from 25 to 44, 20.50% from 45 to 64, and 11.70% who were 65 years of age or older. The median age was 32 years. For every 100 females there were 97.30 males. For every 100 females age 18 and over, there were 93.50 males.

The median income for a household in the county was $33,392, and the median income for a family was $40,345. Males had a median income of $30,434 versus $22,045 for females. The per capita income for the county was $15,497. About 12.90% of families and 17.60% of the population were below the poverty line, including 21.70% of those under age 18 and 12.20% of those age 65 or over.

Over half the children in the county are born out of wedlock. About a third are born to teenaged mothers. The county has about twice the state average in terms of high school dropouts.

== Crime ==
Between 1990 and 2005, the county had a suicide rate four times higher than the state. The county exceeds the state and national rates in both violent and property crimes.

== Communities ==
=== Cities ===
- Bemidji (county seat)
- Blackduck
- Funkley
- Kelliher
- Solway
- Tenstrike
- Turtle River
- Wilton

Townships and unorganized territories of Beltrami County

=== Townships ===
- Alaska Township
- Battle Township
- Bemidji Township
- Benville Township
- Birch Township
- Buzzle Township
- Cormant Township
- Durand Township
- Eckles Township
- Frohn Township
- Grant Valley Township
- Hagali Township
- Hamre Township
- Hines Township
- Hornet Township
- Jones Township
- Kelliher Township
- Lammers Township
- Langor Township
- Lee Township
- Liberty Township
- Maple Ridge Township
- Minnie Township
- Moose Lake Township
- Nebish Township
- Northern Township
- O'Brien Township
- Port Hope Township
- Quiring Township
- Roosevelt Township
- Shooks Township
- Shotley Township
- Spruce Grove Township
- Steenerson Township
- Sugar Bush Township
- Summit Township
- Taylor Township
- Ten Lake Township
- Turtle Lake Township
- Turtle River Township
- Waskish Township
- Woodrow Township

=== Unorganized territories ===
- Brook Lake
- Lower Red Lake
- North Beltrami
- Shotley Brook
- Upper Red Lake

=== Census-designated places ===
- Elbow Lake
- Little Rock
- Ponemah
- Red Lake
- Redby

=== Unincorporated communities ===
- Andrusia
- Aure
- Carmel
- Debs
- Four Town
- Hines
- Jelle
- Pennington
- Pinewood
- Puposky
- Quiring
- Saum
- Secluded Acres
- Shooks
- Waskish
- Werner

== Government and politics ==
From the New Deal realignment in 1932 through 1996, Beltrami County leaned Democratic, selecting the Democratic nominee in every presidential election save Eisenhower's landslides in 1952 and 1956 and Nixon's in 1972. In 2000, George W. Bush became the first Republican to carry the county since 1972. Bush fell short of a majority, with third parties (particularly Green nominee Ralph Nader) doing well statewide, but his 48.5% vote share was higher than any Republican's from 1964 to 1996 save Nixon in 1972 and Reagan in 1984. Beltrami returned to the Democratic column in the next three elections, but in 2016, Donald Trump became the second Republican since 1972 to carry the county, winning a bare majority; in 2020, he won it again with a slightly higher percentage, but the margin of victory shrank due to the decrease in vote share for third party candidates. Trump continued this trend in 2024 when he increased his share of the vote to nearly 52%.

United States presidential election results for Beltrami County, Minnesota
Year	Republican		Democratic		Third party(ies)	
Year	No.	%	No.	%	No.	%
1892	57	44.88%	44	34.65%	26	20.47%
1896	202	47.98%	213	50.59%	6	1.43%
1900	1,339	62.05%	767	35.54%	52	2.41%
1904	1,953	82.37%	234	9.87%	184	7.76%
1908	1,882	63.39%	648	21.83%	439	14.79%
1912	490	16.20%	790	26.12%	1,745	57.69%
1916	1,331	33.04%	1,912	47.47%	785	19.49%
1920	4,518	61.26%	1,427	19.35%	1,430	19.39%
1924	2,960	46.22%	323	5.04%	3,121	48.74%
1928	4,062	62.28%	2,221	34.05%	239	3.66%
1932	2,318	32.10%	4,386	60.73%	518	7.17%
1936	2,182	24.36%	6,507	72.65%	268	2.99%
1940	3,511	32.77%	7,036	65.68%	166	1.55%
1944	2,705	32.76%	5,490	66.50%	61	0.74%
1948	3,126	32.63%	6,020	62.84%	434	4.53%
1952	4,817	53.75%	4,092	45.66%	53	0.59%
1956	3,974	50.97%	3,807	48.83%	16	0.21%
1960	4,482	48.95%	4,653	50.81%	22	0.24%
1964	3,184	34.74%	5,967	65.10%	15	0.16%
1968	3,912	40.90%	5,034	52.63%	619	6.47%
1972	5,947	52.20%	5,194	45.59%	252	2.21%
1976	5,214	39.25%	7,540	56.76%	531	4.00%
1980	6,481	41.71%	7,432	47.83%	1,624	10.45%
1984	7,414	49.43%	7,481	49.88%	103	0.69%
1988	6,652	46.26%	7,566	52.61%	162	1.13%
1992	5,204	32.55%	7,210	45.10%	3,573	22.35%
1996	5,806	36.64%	8,006	50.52%	2,036	12.85%
2000	8,346	48.48%	7,301	42.41%	1,570	9.12%
2004	10,237	48.45%	10,592	50.13%	302	1.43%
2008	9,762	43.90%	12,019	54.05%	455	2.05%
2012	9,637	43.70%	11,818	53.59%	596	2.70%
2016	10,783	50.00%	8,688	40.29%	2,093	9.71%
2020	12,188	50.39%	11,426	47.24%	575	2.38%
2024	12,898	51.85%	11,493	46.20%	483	1.94%

On January 7, 2020, in response to Trump's executive order, the Beltrami County Board of Commissioners voted to prohibit refugees from resettling in the area.

County Board of Commissioners
Position	Name	District
Commissioner	Craig Gaasvig	District 1
Commissioner	Joe Gould	District 2
Commissioner	Scott Winger	District 3
Commissioner	Tim Sumner	District 4
Commissioner	John Carlson	District 5

State Legislature (2023-2025)
Position	Name	Affiliation	District
Senate	Steve Green	Republican	District 2
House of Representatives	Matt Grossell	Republican	District 2A
House of Representatives	Matt Bliss	Republican	District 2B

U.S Congress (2023-2025)
Position	Name	Affiliation	District
House of Representatives	Pete Stauber	Republican	8th
Senate	Amy Klobuchar	Democratic	N/A
Senate	Tina Smith	Democratic	N/A

== Education ==
School districts include:

- Bemidji Area Schools
- Blackduck Public School District
- Cass Lake-Bena Public Schools
- Kelliher Public School District
- Red Lake School District
- Grygla Public School District

== See also ==
- National Register of Historic Places listings in Beltrami County, Minnesota
- Red Lake, the largest lake that is entirely in Minnesota.
