= Area code 218 =

Area code for northern Minnesota

Coordinates: 47°18′N 93°56′W

A map of Minnesota area codes

Area code 218 is a telephone area code in the North American Numbering Plan (NANP) for the northern part of the U.S. state of Minnesota. It is assigned to the largest of Minnesota's original two numbering plan areas (NPAs), but its geographical boundaries have been modified since inception. It comprises roughly the northern half of the state, and includes the cities of Duluth, Hibbing, Brainerd, Bemidji, Fergus Falls, and Moorhead.

== History ==
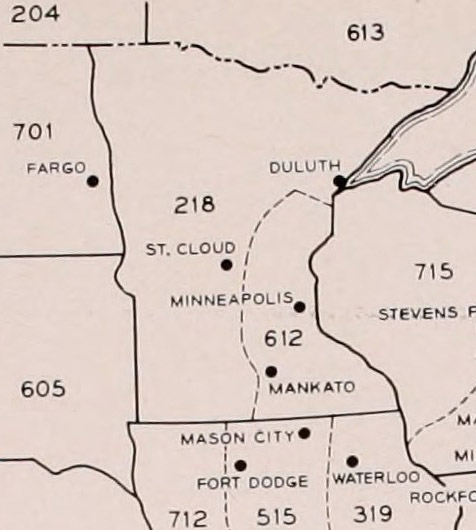
Numbering plan area 218 before 1954

In the initial 1947 map of the North American Numbering Plan, area code 218 was conceived as a lower-case r-shaped area in the northern and western two-thirds of Minnesota. The southeastern portion, including the Twin Cities, was in area code 612.

As the implementation of the new telephone numbering plan proceeded, the Minnesota area code boundaries were redrawn in 1954 to avoid cutting across major toll traffic routes out of the Twin Cities.

This resulted in three area codes, with 218 covering the northern band of the state, 612 covering the central band, and the new area code 507 forming a southern band. The southern portion of the old 218 (Worthington, Marshall, and Pipestone), was merged with the southern portion of 612 to form the new 507, which ran along the Iowa border. 612 was rotated to stretch from the Wisconsin border to the South Dakota border, absorbing a slice of the old 218 (St. Cloud, Alexandria, Appleton). 218 was pushed into east-central Minnesota, absorbing the old 612's eastern portion and taking on roughly its present shape.

A small change in the 1990s brought the Northwest Angle into the 218 area code; that region had previously been part of Bell Canada's Clearwater Bay exchange in area code 807.

Due to northern Minnesota's low population density, the region was unaffected when central Minnesota went from one area code to five from 1996 to 2000. Area code 320, created out of the former western portion of 612 in 1996, runs the length of the southern border with 218. The 612 area code has since been reduced to just Minneapolis and a few nearby suburbs.

The western portion of 218, generally everything from Brainerd westward, shares a LATA with the eastern half of North Dakota, including Fargo and Grand Forks.

Exhaust Projections by the NANP Administrator estimate that northern Minnesota will not need another area code until about 2028.

Until October 2021, area code 218 had telephone numbers assigned for the central office code 988. In 2020, 988 was designated nationwide as a dialing code for the National Suicide Prevention Lifeline, which created a conflict for exchanges that permit seven-digit dialing. This area code was therefore scheduled to transition to ten-digit dialing by October 24, 2021.

== Service area and central office prefixes ==
- Ada: 415, 474, 784
- Aitkin: 429, 670, 887, 927, 928
- Akeley: — see Nevis
- Alborn: 345, 453, 501, 642
- Alvarado: 960
- Angora: 361, 376, 506
- Argyle: 438
- Ashby: 747
- Askov: 658
- Audubon: 439, 532
- Aurora: 229, 306, 318, 516, 638, 648, 865, 873, 876
- Babbitt: 413, 827, 872
- Backus: 682, 947
- Badger: 242, 450, 452, 669
- Bagley: 467, 657, 694, 785
- Barnesville: 354, 493, 937
- Barnum: 380, 382, 389, 496, 503, 610
- Battle Lake: 282, 405, 495, 535, 862, 864
- Baudette: 395, 434, 634, 635
- Baxter: see Brainerd
- Bejou: 930, 936
- Beltrami: 926
- Bemidji: 209, 210, 214, 308, 333, 335, 364, 368, 407, 441, 444, 497, 508, 556, 558, 586, 604, 751, 755, 759, 760, 766, 888
- Bena: 202, 634
- Bertha: 924
- Big Falls: 202, 634, 922
- Bigfork: 743
- Biwabik: 516, 865, 873
- Blackduck: 202, 239, 553
- Borup: 494, 582
- Bovey: 215, 244, 245, 247, 256, 259, 360, 588, 603, 667, 812, 910
- Boy River: 889
- Brainerd: 203, 232, 251, 270, 297, 316, 317, 330, 454, 513, 515, 537, 818, 820, 821, 822, 824, 825, 828, 829, 831, 833, 838, 839, 851, 855, 892
- Brandon: 267
- Breckenridge: 446, 517, 557, 641, 643, 651, 955
- Brimson: 217, 799, 848
- Britt: 361, 506
- Brookston: 453
- Bygland: 893
- Callaway: 204, 375, 572, 983
- Campbell: 479
- Carlos: 338
- Carlton: 384, 660, 673, 882
- Cass Lake: 339, 518, 975, 987
- Chisholm: 254, 258, 274, 404, 447, 489, 676, 929, 942
- Clarissa: 756
- Clearbrook: 776
- Climax: 857
- Cloquet: 403, 451, 499, 609, 655, 878, 879, 900
- Cohasset: see Grand Rapids
- Coleraine: 244, 245, 256, 259, 360, 603, 667, 812, 910
- Cook: 361, 376, 506, 645, 666
- Cotton: 482
- Crane Lake: 993
- Cromwell: 644
- Crookston: 275, 277, 280, 281, 289, 470, 521, 551, 650
- Crosby: 545, 546, 678, 765, 772, 866, 928
- Dalton: 589
- Deer Creek: 462, 548
- Deer River: 246
- Deerwood: 257, 381, 394, 433, 527, 534, 622, 678, 764, 928
- Dent: 495, 758
- Detroit Lakes: 234, 314, 325, 396, 530, 570, 841, 844, 846, 847, 849, 850, 997
- Dilworth: — see Moorhead
- Duluth: 206, 213, 216, 221, 241, 249, 260, 269, 279, 302, 310, 336, 337, 340, 341, 343, 348, 349, 355, 390, 391, 393, 409, 428, 461, 464, 481, 491, 514, 520, 524, 525, 529, 576, 578, 580, 590, 591, 600, 606, 607, 608, 617, 619, 623, 624, 625, 626, 628, 672, 720, 721, 722, 723, 724, 725, 726, 727, 728, 729, 730, 733, 740, 786, 788, 800, 810, 860, 896, 940
- Eagle Bend: 738
- East Drayton: 455
- East Grand Forks: 207, 230, 309, 399, 693, 773, 779, 791, 793
- Effie: 743
- Elbow Lake: 685
- Ely: 235, 365, 504, 664, 881
- Embarrass: 307, 718, 984
- Emily: 692, 763
- Erhard: 842
- Erskine: 687
- Euclid: 289, 965
- Evansville: 948
- Eveleth: 744
- Federal Dam: 654, 665, 889
- Fergus Falls: 205, 321, 332, 468, 531, 560, 602, 671, 731, 736, 737, 739, 770, 998
- Fertile: 574, 637, 945
- Fifty Lakes: 543, 692
- Finland: 323, 353
- Fisher: 289, 891, 893
- Floodwood: 476, 661
- Fosston: 431, 435, 490, 563, 687
- Frazee: 334
- Garrison: 257, 678, 764
- Gary: 261, 356, 930, 935, 936
- Gateway: 426
- Gatzke: 294, 459
- Gilbert: 318, 516, 648, 865, 873
- Glyndon: 498
- Gonvick: 487
- Goodridge: 294, 378
- Grand Marais: 264, 370, 387, 388, 412, 877
- Grand Portage: — see Hovland
- Grand Rapids: 212, 244, 245, 256, 259, 301, 313, 322, 326, 327, 360, 398, 542, 571, 603, 615, 667, 812, 910, 999
- Greenbush: 528, 781, 782
- Grygla: 294
- Gully: 268
- Hackensack: 675, 682, 836
- Hallock: 379, 455, 526, 614, 843, 853, 988
- Halma: 674, 754
- Halstad: 494
- Hawley: 418, 420, 483, 486, 937, 962
- Hermantown: — see Duluth
- Henning: 579, 583, 690
- Hibbing: 208, 231, 262, 263, 293, 295, 312, 362, 421, 440, 778, 966, 969, 996
- Hill City: 627, 697
- Hines: 239, 553, 835
- Holyoke: 496
- Hovland: 475
- Hoyt Lakes: 219, 225, 949
- Humboldt: 379, 614
- International Falls: 240, 283, 285, 286, 324, 373, 377, 417, 502, 540, 598, 599, 767
- Iron: 258, 404, 929
- Ironton: 257, 394, 433, 622, 765, 928
- Isabella: 323, 432
- Jacobson: 488, 752
- Kabetogama: 374, 377, 502, 601, 875
- Karlstad: 674, 754, 944
- Keewatin: 702, 778
- Kelliher: 647
- Kennedy: 674, 774
- Kent: 557
- Kerrick: 496
- Kettle River: 273, 484, 500
- Kimberly: 272, 549
- Kinney: 489, 676
- Lake Bronson: 754
- Lake George: 224
- Lake Park: 238, 532, 937, 962
- Lancaster: 762
- Laporte: 224, 335
- Lengby: 358, 533, 668
- Leonard: 467, 785, 968
- Littlefork: 250, 276, 278, 377, 868
- Longville: 363, 682, 836, 889
- Lutsen: 264, 412, 663, 877
- Mahnomen: 261, 383, 567, 902, 935
- Makinen: 318, 648
- Marcell: 832
- Max: 798
- McGregor: 419, 448, 768
- Meadowlands: 427, 646
- Menahga: 472, 538, 564
- Mentor: 200
- Merrifield: 562, 656, 765, 967
- Middle River: 222
- Miltona: 267, 338, 943
- Mizpah: — see Northome
- Moorhead: 227, 228, 233, 236, 284, 287, 291, 299, 303, 304, 329, 331, 359, 422, 443, 477, 498, 505, 512, 585, 593, 620, 677, 789, 790, 880, 979, 989
- Moose Lake: 351, 460, 485, 509, 565, 662
- Motley: 352, 397, 575
- Mountain Iron: 258, 404, 489, 676, 929
- Nashua: 479, 630
- Nashwauk: 215, 247, 577, 588, 778, 885
- Nevis: 652, 933
- New York Mills: 385
- Newfolden: 222, 449, 874
- Nielsville: 456, 946
- Nimrod: 472
- Nisswa: 562, 656, 961, 963, 967
- Northome: 897
- Noyes: 379, 614
- Ogema: 204, 572, 983
- Oklee: 465, 687, 698, 796
- Orr: 636, 757, 787
- Osage: 538, 573, 581
- Oslo: 691, 695, 965
- Ottertail: 367, 548, 583
- Outing: 792
- Palisade: 426, 549, 621, 845
- Park Rapids: 237, 252, 266, 344, 366, 552, 616, 699, 732
- Parkers Prairie: 338
- Pelican Rapids: 532, 592, 842, 863
- Pengilly: 215, 247, 588, 778, 910
- Pennington: 335
- Pequot Lakes: 272, 543, 559, 562, 568, 569, 692
- Perham: 298, 346, 347, 457
- Perley: 456, 861
- Pillager: 746
- Pine River: 543, 561, 587
- Plummer: 465, 698
- Ponsford: 538
- Proctor: —see Duluth
- Puposky: 243, 586, 679, 835
- Randall: 575
- Red Lake Falls: 253, 465, 637, 698
- Remer: 566, 889
- Roosevelt: 442
- Roseau: 242, 424, 450, 452, 463, 469, 528, 669
- Rothsay: 842, 867
- Sabin: 505, 585, 677
- Saginaw: 453, 729
- St. Hilaire: 416, 633, 653, 683, 684, 883, 964
- St. Vincent: 379, 614, 823
- Salol: 242, 424, 450, 452, 463, 469, 669
- Schroeder: 663
- Sebeka: 472, 539, 544, 837
- Shelly: 456, 886
- Shevlin: 467, 657, 785
- Side Lake: 292, 376, 777, 973
- Silver Bay: 220, 226, 315, 353, 594
- Solway: 657, 854
- Spring Lake: 798
- Squaw Lake: 659
- Staples: 296, 397, 414, 541, 575, 884, 894, 895, 898
- Stephen: 437, 466, 478, 480, 991
- Strandquist: 265, 436, 597, 781, 874
- Strathcona: 528, 781
- Sturgeon Lake: 372, 423, 658
- Swan River: 488
- Tamarack: 426
- Tenstrike: 239, 553, 586, 835
- Thief River Falls: 416, 633, 653, 681, 683, 684, 686, 688, 689, 883
- Thomson: —see Carlton
- Tintah: 369, 479, 630
- Tofte: 406, 519
- Tower: 300, 696, 753
- Trail: 563
- Twin Valley: 350, 584
- Two Harbors: 510, 595, 830, 834
- Ulen: 494, 567, 596, 962
- Underwood: 495, 826
- Vergas: 342
- Verndale: 445
- Viking: 416, 523, 633, 653, 683, 684, 874, 883
- Vining: 267, 338, 548, 583, 769
- Virginia: 248, 288, 290, 305, 404, 410, 471, 550, 735, 741, 742, 744, 748, 749, 750, 780, 994
- Wadena: 271, 319, 371, 402, 408, 430, 629, 631, 632, 639, 640, 981
- Walker: 224, 507, 536, 547, 836
- Wannaska: 424, 425, 463, 469
- Warba: 488, 492, 649
- Warren: 201, 400, 437, 712, 745, 965
- Warroad: 223, 386, 986
- Waskish: 554
- Waubun: 204, 261, 401, 473, 567, 572, 734, 935, 936, 983
- Wawina: 488
- Wendell: 458, 630
- Williams: 635, 783
- Willow River: 658
- Winger: 563, 574, 637, 687, 930, 938
- Wirt: 798
- Wolverton: 505, 557, 585, 995
- Wrenshall: see Carlton
- Wright: 357, 899

Premium calls (unassigned): 211, 218, 255, 311, 320, 392, 411, 511, 522, 555, 570, 588, 605, 611, 612, 613, 618, 680, 700, 701, 703, 704, 705, 706, 707, 708, 709, 710, 711, 713, 714, 715, 716, 717, 719, 761, 771, 775, 794, 795, 797, 801, 802, 803, 804, 805, 806, 807, 808, 809, 811, 813, 814, 815, 816, 817, 819, 840, 852, 856, 858, 859, 869, 870, 871, 890, 901, 903, 904, 905, 906, 907, 908, 911, 912, 913, 914, 915, 916, 917, 918, 919, 920, 921, 923, 925, 931, 932, 934, 939, 941, 950, 951, 952, 953, 954, 956, 957, 958, 959, 970, 971, 972, 974, 976, 977, 978, 980, 982, 985, 990, 992

== See also ==
- List of Minnesota area codes
- List of North American Numbering Plan area codes

Minnesota area codes: 218, 320, 507/924, 612, 651, 763, 952
| | North: 204/431/584, 807 | |
| West: 701 | 218 | East: 715/534, Lake Superior |
| | South: 320 | |
Manitoba area codes: 204/431/584
Ontario area codes: 416/437/647/942, 519/226/548/382, 613/343/753, 705/249/683, 807, 905/289/365/742
Wisconsin area codes: 262, 414, 608/353, 715/534, 920/274
North Dakota area codes: 701
