= Brainerd micropolitan area =

Brainerd Micropolitan Area
- Micropolitan Statistical Area
- Brainerd, MN Micropolitan Statistical Area
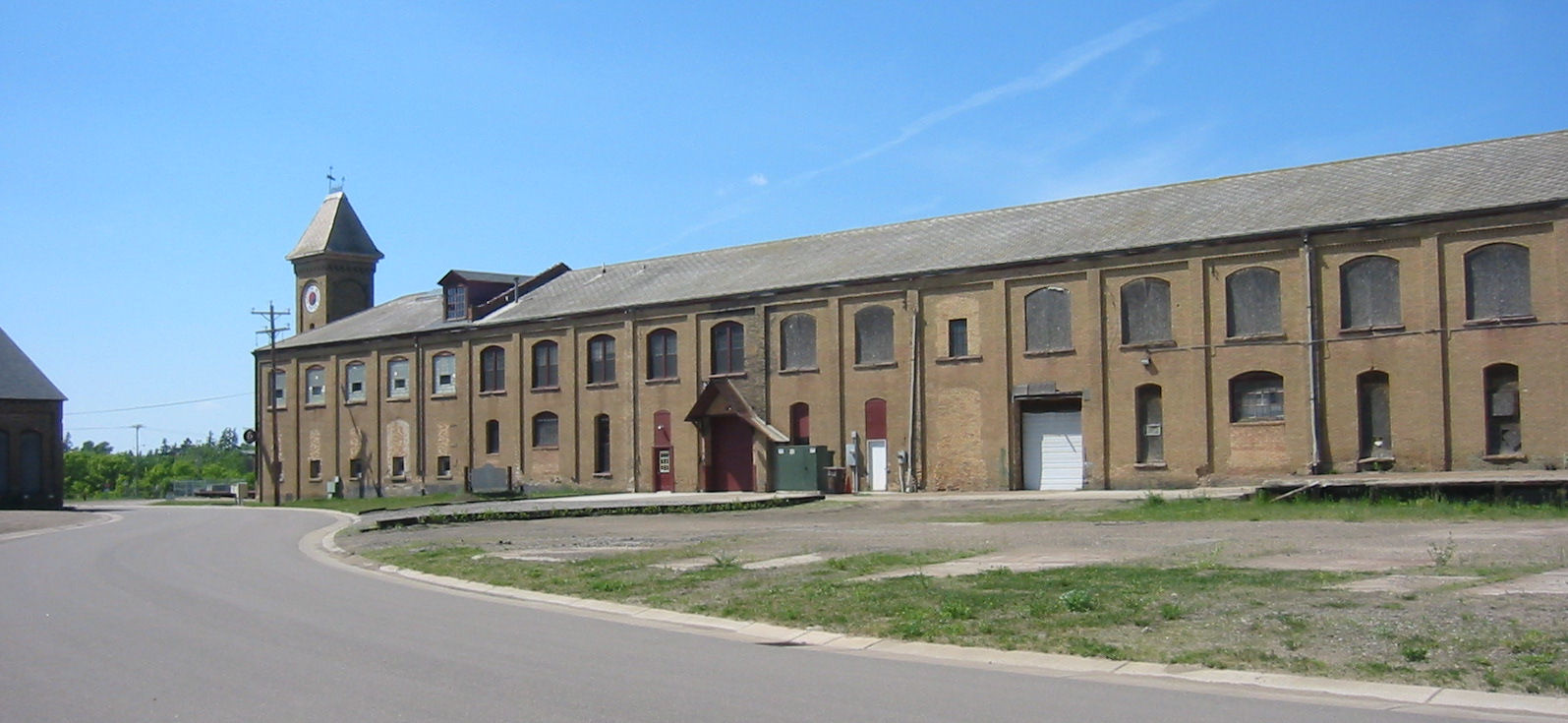
- Northern Pacific Railroad Shops Historic District
Interactive Map of Brainerd, MN μSA
City of Brainerd
Brainerd, MN μSA
- Country: United States
- State: Minnesota
- Largest city: Brainerd
- Time zone: UTC−6 (CST)
  - Summer (DST): UTC−5 (CDT)

The Brainerd Micropolitan Statistical Area, as defined by the United States Census Bureau, is an area consisting of Cass County and Crow Wing County in Northern Minnesota, anchored by the city of Brainerd. As of July 1, 2022 estimate placed the population at 99,222.

== Counties ==
- Cass
- Crow Wing

== Communities ==
- Places with more than 10,000 inhabitants
  - Brainerd (Principal city)
- Places with 1,000 to 10,000 inhabitants
  - Baxter
  - Breezy Point
  - Crosby
  - Crosslake
  - Lake Shore
  - Nisswa
  - Pequot Lakes
- Places with 500 to 1,000 inhabitants
  - Cass Lake
  - Deerwood
  - East Gull Lake
  - Emily
  - Ironton
  - Motley (partial)
  - Pillager
  - Pine River
  - Walker
- Places with fewer than 500 inhabitants
  - Backus
  - Bena
  - Boy River
  - Chickamaw Beach
  - Cuyuna
  - Federal Dam
  - Fifty Lakes
  - Fort Ripley
  - Garrison
  - Hackensack
  - Jenkins
  - Longville
  - Manhattan Beach
  - Remer
  - Riverton
  - Trommald
- Unorganized territories
  - Dean Lake
  - West Crow Wing
  - Wahnena
  - North Cass
  - North Central Cass
  - East Cass
- Unincorporated places
  - Outing
  - Pontoria
- Census-designated place
  - Merrifield

== Townships ==
=== Cass County ===
- Ansel Township
- Barclay Township
- Becker Township
- Beulah Township
- Birch Lake Township
- Blind Lake Township
- Boy Lake Township
- Boy River Township
- Bull Moose Township
- Bungo Township
- Byron Township
- Crooked Lake Township
- Deerfield Township
- Fairview Township
- Gould Township
- Hiram Township
- Home Brook Township
- Inguadona Township
- Kego Township
- Leech Lake Township
- Lima Township
- Loon Lake Township
- Maple Township
- May Township
- McKinley Township
- Meadow Brook Township
- Moose Lake Township
- Otter Tail Peninsula Township
- Pike Bay Township
- Pine Lake Township
- Pine River Township
- Ponto Lake Township
- Poplar Township
- Powers Township
- Remer Township
- Rogers Township
- Salem Township
- Shingobee Township
- Slater Township
- Smoky Hollow Township
- Sylvan Township
- Thunder Lake Township
- Torrey Township
- Trelipe Township
- Turtle Lake Township
- Wabedo Township
- Walden Township
- Wilkinson Township
- Wilson Township
- Woodrow Township

=== Crow Wing County ===
- Bay Lake Township
- Center Township
- Crow Wing Township
- Daggett Brook Township
- Deerwood Township
- Fairfield Township
- Fort Ripley Township
- Gail Lake Township
- Garrison Township
- Ideal Township
- Irondale Township
- Jenkins Township
- Lake Edwards Township
- Little Pine Township
- Long Lake Township
- Maple Grove Township
- Mission Township
- Nokay Lake Township
- Oak Lawn Township
- Pelican Township
- Perry Lake Township
- Platte Lake Township
- Rabbit Lake Township
- Roosevelt Township
- Ross Lake Township
- Sibley Township
- St. Mathias Township
- Timothy Township
- Wolford Township

== Demographics ==
Historical population
Census	Pop.	Note	%±
1860	419		—
1870	580		38.4%
1880	2,805		383.6%
1890	10,099		260.0%
1900	22,027		118.1%
1910	28,481		29.3%
1920	40,463		42.1%
1930	41,218		1.9%
1940	50,872		23.4%
1950	50,343		−1.0%
1960	48,854		−3.0%
1970	52,149		6.7%
1980	62,772		20.4%
1990	66,040		5.2%
2000	82,249		24.5%
2010	91,067		10.7%
2020	96,189		5.6%
2022 (est.)	99,222		3.2%
U.S. Decennial Census; 1790-1960 1900-1990; 1990-2000 2010-2020

As of the census of 2000, there were 82,249 people, 33,143 households, and 22,908 families residing within the μSA. The racial makeup of the μSA was 93.97% White, 0.24% African American, 4.30% Native American, 0.28% Asian, 0.02% Pacific Islander, 0.18% from other races, and 1.01% from two or more races. Hispanic or Latino of any race were 0.73% of the population.

The median income for a household in the μSA was $35,961, and the median income for a family was $42,502. Males had a median income of $31,968 versus $22,064 for females. The per capita income for the μSA was $18,182.

== See also ==
- List of Micropolitan Statistical Areas by state
- Minnesota statistical areas
