= Little Pine, Minnesota =

Unincorporated community in Minnesota, United States

Little Pine
- Unincorporated community
- Location within Minnesota Location within the United States
- Coordinates: 46°44′44″N 93°51′41″W
- Country: United States
- State: Minnesota
- County: Crow Wing
- Township: Little Pine Township
- Elevation: 1,280 ft (390 m)
- Time zone: UTC-6 (Central (CST))
  - Summer (DST): UTC-5 (CDT)
- ZIP code: 56447
- Area code: 218
- GNIS feature ID: 654802

Little Pine is an unincorporated community in Little Pine Township, Crow Wing County, Minnesota, United States, near Emily. It is along Crow Wing County Road 1 near County Road 106. The Little Pine River flows nearby.
