= Emily State Forest =

State Forest in Crow Wing County, Minnesota

- Location within Minnesota
- Interactive map of Emily State Forest

Geography
- Location: Crow Wing County, Minnesota, United States
- Coordinates: 46°43′28″N 93°54′51″W
- Area: 639 acres (259 ha)

Administration
- Established: 1963
- Website: www.dnr.state.mn.us/state_forests/sft00016/index.html

Ecology
- WWF Classification: Western Great Lakes Forests
- EPA Classification: Northern Lakes and Forests
- Disturbance: Wildfire

The Emily State Forest is a state forest located near the town of Emily in the Crow Wing County, Minnesota. With an area of 639 acres (259 ha), it is the smallest state forest in Minnesota. In addition to hiking and hunting, backcountry camping is allowed within the forest, defined campsites are located at the nearby Crow Wing State Forest and Land O'Lakes State Forest.

== See also ==
- List of Minnesota state forests
