= Swanburg, Minnesota =

Unincorporated community in Minnesota, United States

Swanburg
- Unincorporated community
- Location within Minnesota Location within the United States
- Coordinates: 46°44′25″N 94°10′32″W
- Country: United States
- State: Minnesota
- County: Crow Wing
- Township: Timothy Township
- Elevation: 1,309 ft (399 m)
- Time zone: UTC-6 (Central (CST))
  - Summer (DST): UTC-5 (CDT)
- ZIP code: 56474 and 56442
- Area code: 218
- GNIS feature ID: 652912

Swanburg is an unincorporated community in Timothy Township, Crow Wing County, Minnesota, United States. It is along Crow Wing County Road 1 near Swanburg Road. Nearby places include Pine River, Manhattan Beach, and Crosslake.
