= Daggett =

Daggett may refer to:

== Places ==
=== United States ===
- Daggett, California
- Daggett, Indiana
- Daggett, Michigan
- Daggett Township, Michigan
- Daggett, Pennsylvania
- Daggett County, Utah
- Daggett Brook, a stream in Minnesota
- Daggett Brook Township, Minnesota

== People ==
- Aaron Daggett (1837–1938), the last surviving Union general of the American Civil War when he died at the age of 100
- Avalon Daggett (1907–2002), American filmmaker
- Beverly Daggett (1945-2015), a politician from Maine
- Chris Daggett, (born 1950), Independent candidate for governor of New Jersey in 2009 election
- David Daggett (1764–1851), American politician from Connecticut and a founder of the Yale Law School
- Hallie Morse Daggett (1878–1964), first woman fire observer for US Forest Service
- Harriet Daggett, (1891–1966), American academic and lawyer
- Henry J. Daggett (1826–1910), New York assemblyman
- Herman Daggett (1766–1832), American Congregational minister and animal rights writer.
- Horace Daggett (1931-1998), American politician from Iowa
- John Daggett (1833–1919), Lieutenant Governor of California 1883-87
- John D. Daggett (1793–1874), mayor of St Louis, Missouri 1841-42
- Mike Daggett (?-1911), involved in the Battle of Kelley Creek
- Naphtali Daggett (1727–1780), president pro tempore of Yale College
- Rollin M. Daggett (1831–1901), American politician and diplomat
- Rufus Daggett (1838–1912), American Union Civil War era brevet brigadier general
- Tim Daggett (born 1962), American gymnast
- Valerie Daggett, professor of bioengineering at the University of Washington

== Other ==
- Daggett Beaver, one of the co-stars of the animated show The Angry Beavers
- USS Daggett County (LST-689), tank landing ship in World War II
- J. Noble Daggett, a character in True Grit (novel) and its movie adaptations
- Daggett School District, Daggett County, Utah

== See also ==
- Daget
