= Paul Koering =

American politician

Member of the County Board of Crow Wing County, Minnesota from the 1st district
- Incumbent
- Assumed office January 2013
- Preceded by: Philip J. "PJ" Trusty

Member of the Minnesota Senate from the 12th district
- In office January 7, 2003 – January 3, 2011
- Preceded by: Don Samuelson
- Succeeded by: Paul Gazelka

Personal details
- Born: December 17, 1964 (age 61) Brainerd, Minnesota

Paul Koering (born December 17, 1964) is a Minnesota politician who serves on the County Board of Crow Wing County, Minnesota. He is a former member of the Minnesota Senate from Fort Ripley. A Republican, he represented District 12, which includes all or portions of Crow Wing and Morrison counties, including the city of Brainerd. A liquor store owner, funeral car service owner, and small farmer, he served two terms, but was defeated by former Rep. Paul Gazelka in the August 10, 2010, Republican primary election. He was elected to the Crow Wing County Board in 2012 and re-elected unopposed in 2016; he represents the first district which contains the southern portion of Crow Wing County, including Fort Ripley, Roosevelt Township, Oak Lawn Township and the extreme northeast portion of the city of Brainerd.

Koering was first elected to the senate in 2002, defeating longtime senator and Democrat Don Samuelson, who had been the senate president. He was re-elected in 2006, overcoming both primary and general election opponents.

Koering was a member of the senate's Agriculture and Veterans Committee, the Capital Investment Committee, the Health, Housing and Family Security Committee (on which he was the ranking minority party member), and the Higher Education Committee. He also served on the Finance subcommittees for the Agriculture and Veterans Budget and Policy Division, for the Health and Human Services Budget Division, and for the Higher Education Budget and Policy Division.

Koering's positions tended to be conservative, including opposition to tax increases, opposition to abortion, support for tougher criminal sentences, and support for broad gun rights, including support for a general right to carry a concealed firearm. In a notable exception to that conservatism, he has sided with Senate Democrats in opposing restrictions on gay rights. He is believed to be the first openly gay Republican elected official in Minnesota, and was the only openly gay Republican member of the Minnesota Legislature to date.

Koering effectively 'outed' himself by breaking from the Republican Party line on a procedural vote in the Minnesota Senate. The pivotal moment came on April 7, 2005, when then-State Senator Michele Bachmann used procedural tactics that would have forced a vote on her constitutional amendment to ban same-sex marriage in Minnesota. This vote coincided with the gay and lesbian justFair lobby day at the Capitol, as well as the second anniversary of the death of Koering's mother. Koering explicitly stated his sexual orientation a week later. Some public commentary questioned how this disclosure would affect his prospects for re-election in 2006 in a rural, right-leaning district, but he won by over 12 percentage points. However, he disappointed pro-same-sex marriage advocates by voting against the Minnesota Marriage and Family Protection Act, a DFL-backed proposal to legalize same-sex civil unions in the state.

On June 15, 2010, gay news site TheSword.com stated that Koering went on a dinner date in Brainerd with gay pornographic actor Brandon Wilde. He admitted to the date with Wilde and told The Sword, "I don't see anything wrong with going out with him." In light of the story, the Minnesota Republican Party further distanced themselves from Koering. After losing the August 2010 primary election to Tea Party movement-backed candidate Paul Gazelka by a vote of 57 to 43 percent, he announced his withdrawal from the Republican Party, backing DFL Party candidate Taylor Stevenson's bid for the District 12 seat.

Koering drew national criticism for his comments regarding people who have died from drug overdose. He was quoted by the Brainerd Dispatch as saying, “I don’t know why we’re in such a big hurry to save somebody like this. I guess it sounds kind of harsh, but it kind of gets rid of a problem, in my mind,” during the March 19, 2019 Crow Wing County Board meeting.
