= Shephard, Minnesota =

Unincorporated community in Minnesota, United States

Shephard
- Unincorporated community
- Location within Minnesota Location within the United States
- Coordinates: 46°12′50″N 94°06′15″W
- Country: United States
- State: Minnesota
- County: Crow Wing
- Township: Daggett Brook Township
- Elevation: 1,266 ft (386 m)
- Time zone: UTC-6 (Central (CST))
  - Summer (DST): UTC-5 (CDT)
- ZIP code: 56401
- Area code: 218
- GNIS feature ID: 651952

Shephard is an unincorporated community in south central Crow Wing County, Minnesota, United States. It is located approximately ten miles south-southeast of Brainerd along State Highway 25 (MN 25) at the junction with Crow Wing County Road 2. Daggett Brook flows past the west side of the community and South Long Lake lies approximately three miles to the north.
