= Edward Lake (disambiguation) =

Edward Lake or Lake Edward may refer to:

== Lakes ==
- Lake Edward, a lake in Africa
- Lake Edward (Minnesota), a lake in Minnesota, United States
- Lake Édouard (Quebec), a lake in Upper-Batiscanie, Quebec, Canada

== Place name ==
- Lake Edward, Victoria County, New Brunswick, Canada
- Lac-Édouard, Quebec, a municipality in Upper-Batiscanie, Quebec, Canada

== People ==
- Edward Lake (priest) (1641–1704), English churchman
- Edward Lake (politician) (1835–1908), New Zealand Member of Parliament
- Sir Edward Lake, 1st Baronet (c.1597-1674) of the Lake Baronets
- Eddie Lake (1916–1995), American baseball player
- Eddie Lake (footballer) (1951–2020), Australian rules footballer
