= Long Lake Township, Minnesota =

Long Lake Township is the name of some places in the U.S. state of Minnesota:

- Long Lake Township, Crow Wing County, Minnesota
- Long Lake Township, Watonwan County, Minnesota
