= Kego Lake =

Lake in the state of Minnesota, United States

- Location within Minnesota
- Location: Crow Wing County, Minnesota
- Coordinates: 46°46′15″N 94°5′1″W
- Type: lake

Kego Lake is a lake in Crow Wing County, in the U.S. state of Minnesota.

Kego is a name derived from the Ojibwe language meaning "fish".

== See also ==
- List of lakes in Minnesota
