= Barrows, Minnesota =

Unincorporated community in Minnesota, United States

Barrows
- Unincorporated community
- Location within Minnesota Location within the United States
- Coordinates: 46°18′04″N 94°15′14″W
- Country: United States
- State: Minnesota
- County: Crow Wing
- Township: Crow Wing Township
- Elevation: 1,204 ft (367 m)
- Time zone: UTC-6 (Central (CST))
  - Summer (DST): UTC-5 (CDT)
- ZIP code: 56401
- Area code: 218
- GNIS feature ID: 639649

Barrows is an unincorporated community in Crow Wing Township, Crow Wing County, Minnesota, United States, near Brainerd. It is located along Business Highway 371 (MN 371) near Depot Street, Barrows Avenue, and 70th Avenue.

A post office called Barrows was established in 1911, and remained in operation until 1924. The community was named for W. A. Barrows, Jr.
