= Pine Center, Minnesota =

Unincorporated community in Minnesota, United States

Pine Center
- Unincorporated community
- Location within Minnesota Location within the United States
- Coordinates: 46°12′52″N 93°54′52″W
- Country: United States
- State: Minnesota
- County: Crow Wing
- Township: Roosevelt Township
- Elevation: 1,316 ft (401 m)
- Time zone: UTC-6 (Central (CST))
  - Summer (DST): UTC-5 (CDT)
- ZIP code: 56401
- Area code: 218
- GNIS feature ID: 649444

Pine Center is an unincorporated community in Roosevelt Township, Crow Wing County, Minnesota, United States. The community is located near the junction of Crow Wing County Roads 2 and 8. Nearby places include Brainerd, Garrison, Hillman, and Vineland.
