= Pelican Township, Minnesota =

Pelican Township is the name of some places in the U.S. state of Minnesota:

- Pelican Township, Crow Wing County, Minnesota
- Pelican Township, Otter Tail County, Minnesota

== See also ==
- Pelican Lake Township, Grant County, Minnesota
- Pelican Town, a fictional town from the 2016 video game Stardew Valley
