= Iron Hub, Minnesota =

Unincorporated community in Minnesota, United States

Iron Hub
- Unincorporated community
- Location within Minnesota Location within the United States
- Coordinates: 46°31′10″N 93°51′12″W
- Country: United States
- State: Minnesota
- County: Crow Wing
- Township: Rabbit Lake Township
- Elevation: 1,250 ft (380 m)
- Time zone: UTC-6 (Central (CST))
  - Summer (DST): UTC-5 (CDT)
- ZIP code: 56431
- Area code: 218
- GNIS feature ID: 645456

Iron Hub is an unincorporated community in Rabbit Lake Township, Crow Wing County, Minnesota, United States, near Deerwood and Aitkin. It is along Iron Hub Road near Crow Wing County Road 32 and State Highway 210 (MN 210).
