= Crosby Beach, Minnesota =

Unincorporated community in Minnesota, United States

Crosby Beach
- Unincorporated community
- Location within Minnesota Location within the United States
- Coordinates: 46°28′18″N 93°56′59″W
- Country: United States
- State: Minnesota
- County: Crow Wing
- Township: Irondale Township
- Elevation: 1,266 ft (386 m)
- Time zone: UTC-6 (Central (CST))
  - Summer (DST): UTC-5 (CDT)
- ZIP code: 56455, 56441, 56444
- Area code: 218
- GNIS feature ID: 642479

Crosby Beach is an unincorporated community in Irondale Township, Crow Wing County, Minnesota, United States, near Crosby.
