= St. Mathias, Minnesota =

Unincorporated community in Minnesota, United States

St. Mathias
- Unincorporated community
- Location within Minnesota Location within the United States
- Coordinates: 46°13′22″N 94°15′04″W
- Country: United States
- State: Minnesota
- County: Crow Wing
- Township: St. Mathias Township
- Elevation: 1,227 ft (374 m)
- Time zone: UTC-6 (Central (CST))
  - Summer (DST): UTC-5 (CDT)
- ZIP code: 56449
- Area code: 218
- GNIS feature ID: 654929

St. Mathias is an unincorporated community in St. Mathias Township, Crow Wing County, Minnesota, United States. It is along Crow Wing County Road 121 near Hay Creek Road and Sleepy Hollow Road. Nearby places include Fort Ripley, Brainerd, and St. Mathias Park. Hay Creek and the Nokasippi River both flow nearby.
