= Woodrow, Minnesota =

Unincorporated community in Minnesota, United States

Woodrow
- Unincorporated community
- Location within Minnesota Location within the United States
- Coordinates: 46°23′18″N 94°04′28″W
- Country: United States
- State: Minnesota
- County: Crow Wing
- Township: Oak Lawn Township
- Elevation: 1,270 ft (390 m)
- Time zone: UTC-6 (Central (CST))
  - Summer (DST): UTC-5 (CDT)
- ZIP code: 56401
- Area code: 218
- GNIS feature ID: 654377

Woodrow is an unincorporated community in Oak Lawn Township, Crow Wing County, Minnesota, United States, near Brainerd. It is along Woodrow Road near Dullum Road.

Woodrow was platted in 1914, and is named for Woodrow Wilson, 28th president of the United States. A post office was established at Woodrow in 1915, and remained in operation until 1931.
