= Crow Wing, Minnesota =

Unincorporated community in Minnesota, United States

Crow Wing
- Unincorporated community
- Location within Minnesota Location within the United States
- Coordinates: 46°16′48″N 94°17′33″W
- Country: United States
- State: Minnesota
- County: Crow Wing
- Township: Crow Wing Township
- Elevation: 1,194 ft (364 m)
- Time zone: UTC-6 (Central (CST))
  - Summer (DST): UTC-5 (CDT)
- ZIP code: 56401
- Area code: 218
- GNIS feature ID: 642507

Crow Wing is an unincorporated community in Crow Wing Township, Crow Wing County, Minnesota, United States, south of Brainerd and Baxter. It is along State Highway 371 (MN 371) near 50th Avenue SW and 85th Street. Crow Wing is three miles northeast of Crow Wing State Park and the former town of Old Crow Wing.
