= Klondyke, Minnesota =

Unincorporated community in Minnesota, United States

Klondyke
- Unincorporated community
- Location within Minnesota Location within the United States
- Coordinates: 46°26′30″N 93°57′58″W
- Country: United States
- State: Minnesota
- County: Crow Wing
- Township: Irondale Township
- Elevation: 1,270 ft (390 m)
- Time zone: UTC-6 (Central (CST))
  - Summer (DST): UTC-5 (CDT)
- ZIP code: 56455
- Area code: 218
- GNIS feature ID: 654779

Klondyke is an unincorporated community in Irondale Township, Crow Wing County, Minnesota, United States. The community lies just south of County Route 12 and on the north shore of Lookout Lake. It lies approximately three miles south of Crosby and Ironton.

A post office called Klondike was in operation from 1897 until 1907. The name is an allusion to the Klondike Gold Rush, as Crow Wing County is also a mining region.
