= Loerch, Minnesota =

Unincorporated community in Minnesota, United States

Loerch
- Unincorporated community
- Location within Minnesota Location within the United States
- Coordinates: 46°24′12″N 94°04′21″W
- Country: United States
- State: Minnesota
- County: Crow Wing
- Township: Oak Lawn Township
- Elevation: 1,240 ft (380 m)
- Time zone: UTC-6 (Central (CST))
  - Summer (DST): UTC-5 (CDT)
- ZIP code: 56401
- Area code: 218
- GNIS feature ID: 654803

Loerch is an unincorporated community in Oak Lawn Township, Crow Wing County, Minnesota, United States, near Brainerd. It is along Loerch Road near Dullum Road.
