= Legionville, Minnesota =

Unincorporated community in Minnesota, United States

Legionville
- Unincorporated community
- Location within Minnesota Location within the United States
- Coordinates: 46°26′50″N 94°11′58″W
- Country: United States
- State: Minnesota
- County: Crow Wing
- Elevation: 1,214 ft (370 m)
- Time zone: UTC-6 (Central (CST))
  - Summer (DST): UTC-5 (CDT)
- ZIP code: 56401
- Area code: 218
- GNIS feature ID: 646585

Legionville is an unincorporated community in Crow Wing County, Minnesota, United States, near Brainerd.
