= East Cass, Minnesota =

Unorganized territory of Cass County, Minnesota, United States

Coordinates: 47°06′16″N 93°50′09″W

- Unorganized territory
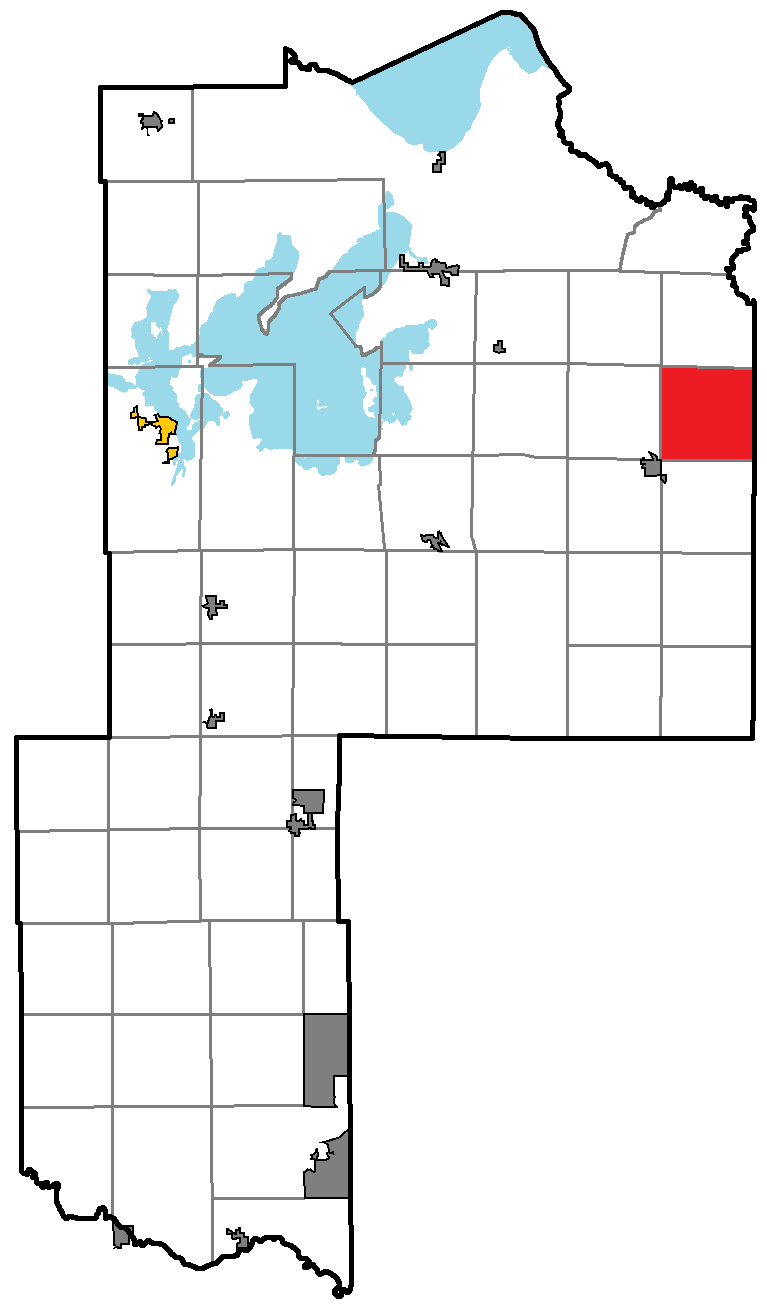
- Location of East Cass, within Cass County, Minnesota
- Country: United States
- State: Minnesota
- County: Cass

Area
  - Total: 36.08 sq mi (93.4 km^{2})
  - Land: 33.01 sq mi (85.5 km^{2})
  - Water: 3.07 sq mi (8.0 km^{2})

Population (2020)
  - Total: 70
  - Density: 2.1/sq mi (0.82/km^{2})
- Time zone: UTC-6 (Central (CST))
  - Summer (DST): UTC-5 (CDT)
- Area code: 218

East Cass is an unorganized territory in Cass County, Minnesota, United States. The population was 70 at the 2020 census. It is part of the Brainerd Micropolitan Statistical Area.

== Geography ==
According to the United States Census Bureau, the unorganized territory has a total area of 36.1 square miles (93.4 km^{2}), of which 33.1 square miles (85.7 km^{2}) is land and 3.0 square miles (7.7 km^{2}) (8.26%) is water.

== Demographics ==
At the 2000 United States census there were 43 people, 21 households, and 16 families living in the unorganized territory. The population density was 1.3 inhabitants per square mile (0.50/km^{2}). There were 49 housing units at an average density of 1.5 per square mile (0.58/km^{2}). The racial makeup of the unorganized territory was 97.67% White, and 2.33% from two or more races. Of the 21 households 23.8% had children under the age of 18 living with them, 61.9% were married couples living together, and 23.8% were non-families. 23.8% of households were one person and 9.5% were one person aged 65 or older. The average household size was 2.05 and the average family size was 2.38.

The age distribution was 14.0% under the age of 18, 7.0% from 18 to 24, 27.9% from 25 to 44, 27.9% from 45 to 64, and 23.3% 65 or older. The median age was 46 years. For every 100 females, there were 126.3 males. For every 100 females age 18 and over, there were 105.6 males.

The median household income was $36,250 and the median family income was $37,500. Males had a median income of $26,250 versus $30,000 for females. The per capita income for the unorganized territory was $18,175. None of the population or the families were below the poverty line.
