= Dean Lake, Minnesota =

Unorganized territory of Crow Wing County, Minnesota, United States

Coordinates: 46°36′04″N 93°50′39″W

- Unorganized territory
- Second Assessment, Minnesota
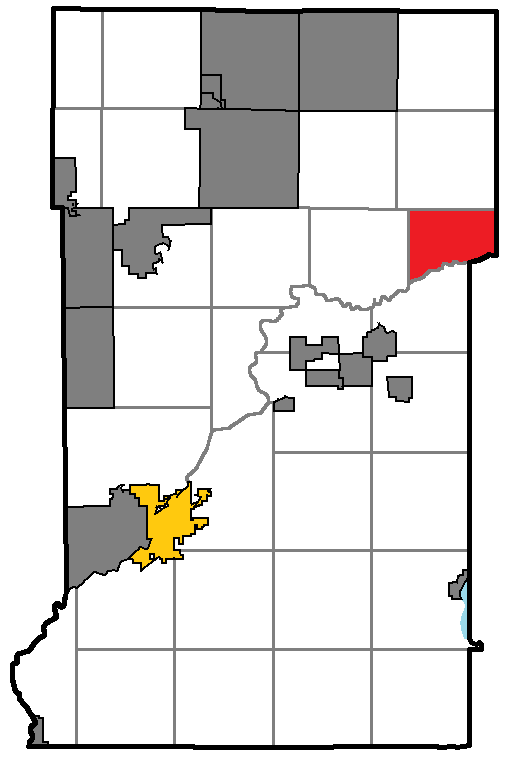
- Location of Dean Lake, within Crow Wing County, Minnesota
- Country: United States
- State: Minnesota
- County: Crow Wing

Area
  - Total: 18.13 sq mi (47.0 km^{2})
  - Land: 16.82 sq mi (43.6 km^{2})
  - Water: 1.31 sq mi (3.4 km^{2})

Population (2020)
  - Total: 120
  - Density: 7.1/sq mi (2.8/km^{2})
- Time zone: UTC-6 (Central (CST))
  - Summer (DST): UTC-5 (CDT)
- Area code: 218

Dean Lake is an unorganized territory in Crow Wing County, Minnesota, United States. The population was 120 at the 2020 census. It is part of the Brainerd Micropolitan Statistical Area. This territory took its name from Dean Lake.

== Geography ==
According to the United States Census Bureau, the unorganized territory has a total area of 18.2 square miles (47.1 km^{2}), of which 16.8 square miles (43.6 km^{2}) is land and 1.3 square miles (3.5 km^{2}) (7.37%) is water. The GNIS also notes it as Second Assessment Unorganized Territory.

== Demographics ==
As of the census of 2000, there were 89 people, 36 households, and 24 families residing in the unorganized territory. The population density was 5.3 inhabitants per square mile (2.0/km^{2}). There were 54 housing units at an average density of 3.2 per square mile (1.2/km^{2}). The racial makeup of the unorganized territory was 96.63% White, 2.25% Asian, and 1.12% from two or more races. Hispanic or Latino of any race were 1.12% of the population.

There were 36 households, out of which 25.0% had children under the age of 18 living with them, 52.8% were married couples living together, 11.1% had a female householder with no husband present, and 30.6% were non-families. 27.8% of all households were made up of individuals, and 8.3% had someone living alone who was 65 years of age or older. The average household size was 2.47 and the average family size was 3.00.

In the unorganized territory the population was spread out, with 21.3% under the age of 18, 6.7% from 18 to 24, 32.6% from 25 to 44, 22.5% from 45 to 64, and 16.9% who were 65 years of age or older. The median age was 42 years. For every 100 females, there were 117.1 males. For every 100 females age 18 and over, there were 133.3 males.

The median income for a household in the unorganized territory was $27,083, and the median income for a family was $27,500. Males had a median income of $21,042 versus $16,500 for females. The per capita income for the unorganized territory was $13,582. There were no families and 8.3% of the population living below the poverty line, including no under eighteens and none of those over 64.

== Notable person ==
- Miles Lord, U.S. district judge
