= North Long Lake =

Lake in the state of Minnesota, United States

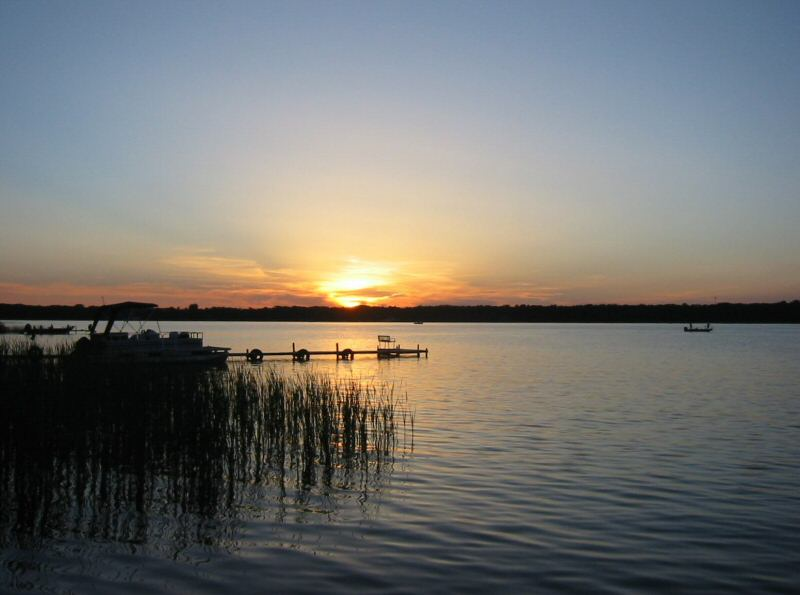
- Sunset on a lake north of w:Brainerd, Minnesota.

- Location within Minnesota Location within the United States
- Location: Brainerd Lakes Area, Crow Wing County, Minnesota, US
- Coordinates: 46.4364°N 94.2411°W
- Basin countries: United States
- Surface area: 6,000 acres (2,400 ha)
- Settlements: Brainerd, Nisswa, Merrifield Minnesota

At 6,000 acres (24 km^{2}), North Long Lake is one of the larger lakes in the Brainerd Lakes Area of the U.S. state of Minnesota.

Number of fish caught in each category (inches)
Species	0-5	6-7	8-9	10-11	12-14	15-19	20-24	25-29	30-34	35-39	40-44	45-49	50+	Total
Black bullhead	0	0	0	1	1	0	0	0	0	0	0	0	0	2
Black crappie	10	6	9	20	1	0	0	0	0	0	0	0	0	46
Bluegill	138	93	10	0	0	0	0	0	0	0	0	0	0	241
Bowfin (dogfish)	0	0	0	0	0	0	3	2	0	0	0	0	0	5
Brown bullhead	0	0	1	4	7	0	0	0	0	0	0	0	0	12
Common Carp	0	0	0	0	0	0	0	3	0	0	0	0	0	3
Green Sunfish	1	0	0	0	0	0	0	0	0	0	0	0	0	1
Hybrid sunfish	14	18	15	0	0	0	0	0	0	0	0	0	0	47
Largemouth bass	1	4	14	28	61	25	0	0	0	0	0	0	0	133
Northern pike	0	0	0	1	8	29	36	24	4	1	0	0	0	103
Pumpkinseed	117	58	1	0	0	0	0	0	0	0	0	0	0	176
Rock bass	4	13	22	26	0	0	0	0	0	0	0	0	0	65
Tullibee (Cisco)	0	1	5	2	0	0	0	0	0	0	0	0	0	8
Walleye	0	0	4	12	17	10	9	1	0	0	0	0	0	53
White sucker	0	0	0	0	0	2	0	0	0	0	0	0	0	2
Yellow bullhead	0	0	12	43	17	0	0	0	0	0	0	0	0	72
Yellow perch	13	23	1	0	0	0	0	0	0	0	0	0	0	37
Source: "www.dnr.state.mn.us". Minnesota Department of Natural Resources.
