= West Crow Wing, Minnesota =

Unorganized territory of Crow Wing County, Minnesota, US

Coordinates: 46°24′44″N 94°14′10″W

- Unorganized territory
- First Assessment, Minnesota
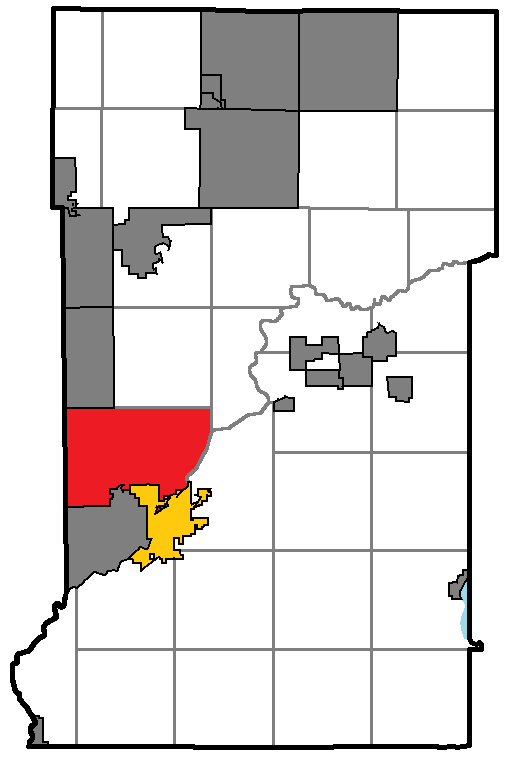
- Location of West Crow Wing, within Crow Wing County, Minnesota
- Country: United States
- State: Minnesota
- County: Crow Wing

Area
  - Total: 45.11 sq mi (116.8 km^{2})
  - Land: 31.44 sq mi (81.4 km^{2})
  - Water: 13.67 sq mi (35.4 km^{2})

Population (2020)
  - Total: 5,649
  - Density: 179.7/sq mi (69.37/km^{2})
- Time zone: UTC-6 (Central (CST))
  - Summer (DST): UTC-5 (CDT)
- Area code: 218

West Crow Wing is an unorganized territory in Crow Wing County, Minnesota, United States. The population was 5,649 at the 2020 census. It is part of the Brainerd Micropolitan Statistical Area.

In 2016, county commissioners considered plans to organize the territory as a township or city.

== Geography ==
According to the United States Census Bureau, the unorganized territory has a total area of 48.8 square miles (126.4 km^{2}), of which 35.1 square miles (91.0 km^{2}) is land and 13.7 square miles (35.4 km^{2}) (27.99%) is water. The GNIS also notes it as First Assessment Unorganized Territory. The unincorporated community of Legionville is located within the area.

== Demographics ==
As of the census of 2000, there were 5,144 people, 1,870 households, and 1,477 families residing in the unorganized territory. The population density was 146.4 inhabitants per square mile (56.5/km^{2}). There were 2,387 housing units at an average density of 67.9 per square mile (26.2/km^{2}). The racial makeup of the unorganized territory was 98.60% White, 0.08% Black or African American, 0.35% Native American, 0.21% Asian, 0.29% from other races, and 0.47% from two or more races. Hispanic or Latino of any race were 0.87% of the population.

There were 1,870 households, out of which 38.1% had children under the age of 18 living with them, 68.3% were married couples living together, 6.8% had a female householder with no husband present, and 21.0% were non-families. 16.2% of all households were made up of individuals, and 4.9% had someone living alone who was 65 years of age or older. The average household size was 2.75 and the average family size was 3.07.

In the unorganized territory the population was spread out, with 27.8% under the age of 18, 7.0% from 18 to 24, 29.0% from 25 to 44, 26.3% from 45 to 64, and 9.9% who were 65 years of age or older. The median age was 38 years. For every 100 females, there were 102.8 males. For every 100 females age 18 and over, there were 104.3 males.

The median income for a household in the unorganized territory was $51,127, and the median income for a family was $55,821. Males had a median income of $40,917 versus $25,922 for females. The per capita income for the unorganized territory was $21,796. About 4.2% of families and 4.2% of the population were below the poverty line, including 3.9% of those under age 18 and 3.0% of those age 65 or over.
