= North Central Cass, Minnesota =

Unorganized territory in Cass County, Minnesota, United States

Coordinates: 47°10′13″N 94°22′28″W

- Unorganized territory
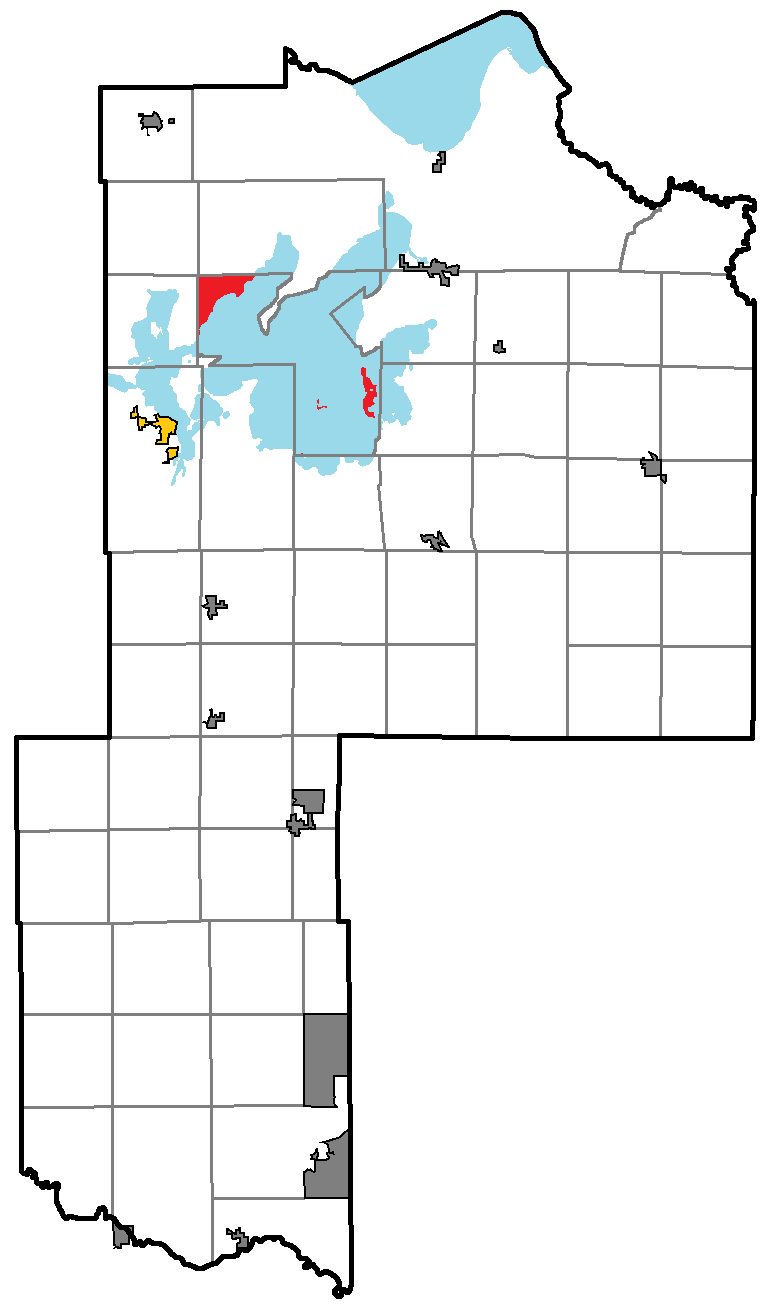
- Location of North Central Cass, within Cass County, Minnesota
- Country: United States
- State: Minnesota
- County: Cass

Area
  - Total: 89.08 sq mi (230.7 km^{2})
  - Land: 8.13 sq mi (21.1 km^{2})
  - Water: 80.95 sq mi (209.7 km^{2})

Population (2020)
  - Total: 48
  - Density: 5.9/sq mi (2.3/km^{2})
- Time zone: UTC-6 (Central (CST))
  - Summer (DST): UTC-5 (CDT)
- Area code: 218

North Central Cass is an unorganized territory in Cass County, Minnesota, United States. The population was 48 at the 2020 census. It is part of the Brainerd Micropolitan Statistical Area.

== Geography ==
According to the United States Census Bureau, the unorganized territory has a total area of 89.1 square miles (230.8 km^{2}), of which 8.2 square miles (21.2 km^{2}) is land and 80.9 square miles (209.6 km^{2}) (90.84%) is water.

== Demographics ==
As of the census of 2000, there were 24 people, 10 households, and 10 families living in the unorganized territory. The population density was 2.9 inhabitants per square mile (1.1/km^{2}). There were 55 housing units at an average density of 6.7 per square mile (2.6/km^{2}). The racial makeup of the unorganized territory was 62.50% White and 37.50% Native American.

There were 10 households, out of which 20.0% had children under the age of 18 living with them, 70.0% were married couples living together, 10.0% had a female householder with no husband present, and 0.0% were non-families. No households were made up of individuals, and none had someone living alone who was 65 years of age or older. The average household size was 2.40 and the average family size was 2.40.

In the unorganized territory the population was spread out, with 12.5% under the age of 18, 4.2% from 18 to 24, 25.0% from 25 to 44, 29.2% from 45 to 64, and 29.2% who were 65 years of age or older. The median age was 52 years. For every 100 females, there were 140.0 males. For every 100 females age 18 and over, there were 133.3 males.

The median income for a household in the unorganized territory was $71,250, and the median income for a family was $71,250. Males had a median income of $0 versus $0 for females. The per capita income for the unorganized territory was $32,314. None of the population or the families were below the poverty line.
