= Whitefish Lake (Minnesota) =

Lake in the state of Minnesota, United States

- Location within Minnesota Location within the United States
- Location: Mille Lacs and Crow Wing counties, Minnesota
- Coordinates: 46°12′20″N 093°48′47″W
- Basin countries: United States
- Surface area: 29.8 km^{2} (11.5 sq mi)
- Surface elevation: 376 m (1,234 ft)

Whitefish Lake is a lake in the U.S. state of Minnesota. The lake is approximately one-half mile west of Mille Lacs Lake.

Whitefish is an English translation of the Ojibwe language name.
