= Round Lake (Minnesota) =

A list of lakes with the same name in the state of Minnesota, United States

The name Round Lake refers to over 36 different lakes in the U.S. state of Minnesota:

- Round Lake, located in Aitkin County, Minnesota
- Round Lake, located in Aitkin County, Minnesota
- Round Lake, located in Aitkin County, Minnesota
- Round Lake, located in Aitkin County, Minnesota
- Round Lake, located in Aitkin County, Minnesota
- Round Lake, located in Anoka County, Minnesota
- Round Lake, located in Becker County, Minnesota
- Round Lake, located in Becker County, Minnesota
- Round Lake, located in Chisago County, Minnesota
- Round Lake, located in Cook County, Minnesota
- Round Lake, located in Cottonwood County, Minnesota
- Round Lake, located in Crow Wing County, Minnesota
- Round Lake, located in Crow Wing County, Minnesota
- Round Lake, located in Douglas County, Minnesota
- Round Lake, located in Hennepin County, Minnesota
- Round Lake, located in Hennepin County, Minnesota
- Round Lake, located in Hubbard County, Minnesota
- Round Lake, located in Itasca County, Minnesota
- Round Lake, located in Itasca County, Minnesota
- Round Lake, located in Itasca County, Minnesota
- Round Lake, located in Itasca County, Minnesota
- Round Lake, located in Jackson County, Minnesota
- Round Lake, located in Le Sueur County, Minnesota
- Round Lake, located in Meeker County, Minnesota
- Round Lake, located in Morrison County, Minnesota
- Round Lake, located in Morrison County, Minnesota
- Round Lake, located in Morrison County, Minnesota
- Round Lake, located in Otter Tail County, Minnesota
- Round Lake, located in Otter Tail County, Minnesota
- Round Lake, located in Otter Tail County, Minnesota
- Round Lake, located in Otter Tail County, Minnesota
- Round Lake, located in Ramsey County, Minnesota
- Round Lake, located in Ramsey County, Minnesota
- Round Lake, located in Ramsey County, Minnesota
- Round Lake, located in Renville County, Minnesota
- Round Lake, located in Sherburne County, Minnesota
- Round Lake, located in St. Louis County, Minnesota
- Round Lake, located in Wadena County, Minnesota
- Round Lake, located in Washington County, Minnesota
- Round Lake, located in Wright County, Minnesota

Round Lake may be an alternate name for a lake in Minnesota:

- Little Round Lake, located in Becker County, Minnesota
- Sylvia Lake, located in Beltrami County, Minnesota
- Moses Lake, located in Cook County, Minnesota
- Gneiss Lake, located in Cook County, Minnesota
- Dolney Lake, located in Crow Wing County, Minnesota
- Orchard Lake, located in Dakota County, Minnesota
- Clausens Lake, located in Hubbard County, Minnesota
- Duck Lake, located in Hubbard County, Minnesota
- Culp Lake, located in Itasca County, Minnesota
- Doyle Lake, located in Lake County, Minnesota
- Rota Lake, located in Lake County, Minnesota
- Circle Lake, located in Lake County, Minnesota
- Maine Lake, located in Otter Tail County, Minnesota
