= Bay Lake, Minnesota =

Unincorporated community in Minnesota, United States

Bay Lake
- Unincorporated community
- Location within Minnesota Location within the United States
- Coordinates: 46°24′34″N 93°52′26″W
- Country: United States
- State: Minnesota
- County: Crow Wing
- Township: Bay Lake Township
- Elevation: 1,289 ft (393 m)
- Time zone: UTC-6 (Central (CST))
  - Summer (DST): UTC-5 (CDT)
- ZIP code: 56444
- Area code: 218
- GNIS feature ID: 639742

Bay Lake is an unincorporated community in Bay Lake Township, Crow Wing County, Minnesota, United States, near Deerwood. It is along State Highway 6 (MN 6) near the junction with Crow Wing County Road 14.

== History ==
Settling in the area begun in the 1870s, when a railroad began to be built from Duluth to the West Coast, despite the area being known prior to this date by some early trappers and fur traders. The settlers that did arrive in the area, despite the lack of infrastructures, mostly migrated due to the promises of the "Homestead Act of 1862" and its benefits.

A worker known as Robert Achibald was the first Withington settler. The town after its funding led to the development of the Sessabegamah Trail which reached as far south as to Bay Lake. There, in 1881, Robert Achibald’s brother, David Archibald, settled.

In the late 1890s, Joseph and Josephine Ruttger, homesteaders on Bay Lake, began providing boats, sleeping accommodations, and meals to anglers who arrived at the Deerwood train station. As their reputation spread, the Ruttgers and their four sons embraced the tourism industry; by the 1930s the family operated five Minnesota resorts and as of 2020, Ruttger’s Bay Lake Lodge is the oldest Minnesota resort operated by its founding family.
