= Crow Wing State Forest =

State forest in Minnesota, United States

- Location within Minnesota
- Interactive map of Crow Wing State Forest

Geography
- Location: Crow Wing County, Minnesota, United States
- Coordinates: 46°36′57″N 94°04′38″W
- Area: 31,307 acres (12,669 ha)

Administration
- Established: 1935
- Authority: Minnesota Department of Natural Resources, Crow Wing County, Potlatch Corp.
- Website: www.dnr.state.mn.us/state_forests/sft00014/index.html

Ecology
- WWF Classification: Western Great Lakes Forests
- EPA Classification: Northern Lakes and Forests
- Disturbance: Wildfire
- Dominant tree species: Pinus strobus, Pinus resinosa

The Crow Wing State Forest is a state forest located near Fairfield Township in Crow Wing County, Minnesota. It is about 20 miles (32 km) northeast of the tourism-based town of Brainerd. Approximately 14,072 acres (5,695 ha) (44%) of the forest of 31,307 acres (12,669 ha) is actively managed. The managed acres are split nearly equally between the Minnesota Department of Natural Resources, Crow Wing County, and the privately owned Potlatch Corp.

Prior to European settlement the area was mainly oak forests and barrens interspersed with pine stands and prairie. Today, Eastern white pine and Norway pine dominate, although stands of oak, aspen, and jack pine occur upland, with wet prairies and conifer bogs in the lowlands.

The interactive Bass Lake Nature Trail (either .75 or 1.75 miles (1.21 or 2.82 km)) introduces users to the forest dynamics present in the forest, including wildfire, snags and its effects on wildlife, and the oak canker, Diplodia quercina. Additional trails located throughout the forest accommodate separate activities, including 1.7 miles (2.7 km) designated for hiking, 33 miles (53 km) for mountain biking, 17.3 miles (27.8 km) each for Class I and Class II All-terrain vehicle (ATV) use, and 17.3 miles (27.8 km) for off-highway motorcycling. Picnicking, fishing, and hunting are also commonly practiced outdoor recreation activities. Waterways within the forest also allow canoers, kayakers, and boaters access to the Pine and Mississippi Rivers.

== See also ==
- List of Minnesota state forests
