= Little Pine River =

Coordinates: 46.6027404°N 94.0333158°W

Location
- Country: United States

Physical characteristics
- Source
  - location: Minnesota

The Little Pine River is a 29.7-mile-long (47.8 km) tributary of the Pine River of Minnesota in the United States. Via the Pine River it is part of the Mississippi River watershed. The Little Pine River begins in the northeast corner of Crow Wing County at the outlet of Little Pine Lake and flows southwest to its junction with the Pine River in Crow Wing State Forest.

== See also ==
- List of rivers of Minnesota
