= Lake Edward (Minnesota) =

Lake in the state of Minnesota, United States

- Location within Minnesota
- Location: Crow Wing County, Minnesota
- Coordinates: 46°30′40″N 94°09′40″W
- Basin countries: United States
- Surface area: 2,575 acres (10.42 km^{2})
- Surface elevation: 368 m (1,207 ft)

Lake Edward is a lake in Crow Wing County, Minnesota.

According to Warren Upham, Lake Edward was probably named for a government surveyor.
