= Pine River (Mississippi River tributary) =

Coordinates: 46.5639°N 94.0367°W

Location
- Country: United States

Physical characteristics
- Source
  - location: Minnesota

The Pine River is a 56.9-mile-long (91.6 km) tributary of the Mississippi River in northern Minnesota, United States.

It rises in Cass County at the outlet of Pine Mountain Lake, southeast of Backus, and takes a winding route generally southeast. It passes the city of Pine River and flows into Crow Wing County, where it enters Upper and then Lower Whitefish Lake, followed by Rush Lake and Cross Lake. The river continues to wind southeast, passing through Crow Wing State Forest and entering the Mississippi 6.5 miles (10.5 km) northwest of Ironton.

Pine River is an English translation of the Ojibwe language name.

== See also ==
- List of rivers of Minnesota
