= Center Township, Crow Wing County, Minnesota =

Township in Minnesota, United States

Center Township
- Township
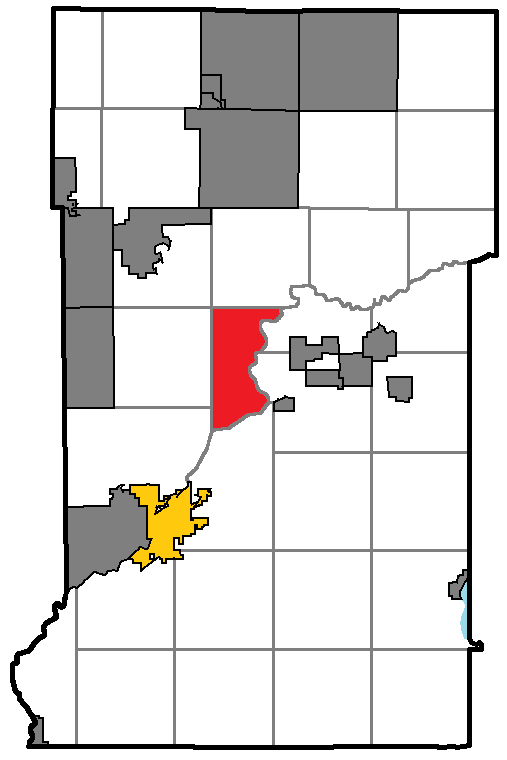
- Location of Center Township, within Crow Wing County, Minnesota
- Coordinates: 46°30′41″N 94°6′36″W
- Country: United States
- State: Minnesota
- County: Crow Wing

Area
  - Total: 21.7 sq mi (56.2 km^{2})
  - Land: 17.8 sq mi (46.0 km^{2})
  - Water: 3.9 sq mi (10.2 km^{2})
- Elevation: 1,217 ft (371 m)

Population (2020)
  - Total: 990
  - Density: 56/sq mi (22/km^{2})
- Time zone: UTC-6 (Central (CST))
  - Summer (DST): UTC-5 (CDT)
- FIPS code: 27-10567
- GNIS feature ID: 0663771
- Website: https://www.centertownshipmn.org/

Center Township is a township in Crow Wing County, Minnesota, United States. The population was 990 at the 2020 census.

== Geography ==
According to the United States Census Bureau, the township has a total area of 21.7 square miles (56 km^{2}), of which 17.8 square miles (46 km^{2}) is land and 4.0 square miles (10 km^{2}) (18.24%) is water.

== Demographics ==
As of the census of 2000, there were 808 people, 325 households, and 244 families residing in the township. The population density was 45.5 inhabitants per square mile (17.6/km^{2}). There were 445 housing units at an average density of 25.1 per square mile (9.7/km^{2}). The racial makeup of the township was 97.77% White, 0.25% Native American, 0.12% Asian, and 1.86% from two or more races. Hispanic or Latino of any race were 0.37% of the population.

There were 325 households, out of which 26.8% had children under the age of 18 living with them, 67.4% were married couples living together, 4.0% had a female householder with no husband present, and 24.9% were non-families. 21.8% of all households were made up of individuals, and 9.5% had someone living alone who was 65 years of age or older. The average household size was 2.47 and the average family size was 2.86.

In the township the population was spread out, with 21.2% under the age of 18, 7.2% from 18 to 24, 28.2% from 25 to 44, 27.2% from 45 to 64, and 16.2% who were 65 years of age or older. The median age was 41 years. For every 100 females, there were 103.5 males. For every 100 females age 18 and over, there were 104.8 males.

The median income for a household in the township was $40,000, and the median income for a family was $47,188. Males had a median income of $35,865 versus $19,219 for females. The per capita income for the township was $19,940. About 4.4% of families and 5.3% of the population were below the poverty line, including 5.2% of those under age 18 and 15.0% of those age 65 or over.
