= Manhattan Beach, Minnesota =

City in Minnesota, United States

Manhattan Beach
- City
- Location of Manhattan Beach within Crow Wing County, Minnesota
- Coordinates: 46°43′37″N 94°08′03″W
- Country: United States
- State: Minnesota
- County: Crow Wing

Area
  - Total: 1.53 sq mi (3.97 km^{2})
  - Land: 1.53 sq mi (3.97 km^{2})
  - Water: 0 sq mi (0.00 km^{2})
- Elevation: 1,299 ft (396 m)

Population (2020)
  - Total: 61
  - Density: 39.8/sq mi (15.38/km^{2})
- Time zone: UTC-6 (Central (CST))
  - Summer (DST): UTC-5 (CDT)
- ZIP code: 56442
- Area code: 218
- FIPS code: 27-39806
- GNIS feature ID: 2395829
- Website: www.manhattanbeachmn.org

Manhattan Beach is a small city in Crow Wing County, Minnesota, United States, near Crosslake. As of the 2020 census, Manhattan Beach had a population of 61. It is part of the Brainerd Micropolitan Statistical Area.

== History ==
Manhattan Beach was incorporated in June 1941.

== Geography ==
According to the United States Census Bureau, the city has a total area of 1.79 square miles (4.64 km^{2}), of which 1.52 square miles (3.94 km^{2}) is land and 0.27 square miles (0.70 km^{2}) is water. It is along County Road 1 near County Road 66.

== Demographics ==
Historical population
Census	Pop.	Note	%±
1940	86		—
1950	72		−16.3%
1960	62		−13.9%
1970	46		−25.8%
1980	60		30.4%
1990	61		1.7%
2000	50		−18.0%
2010	57		14.0%
2020	61		7.0%
U.S. Decennial Census

=== 2010 census ===
As of the census of 2010, there were 57 people, 25 households, and 17 families living in the city. The population density was 37.5 inhabitants per square mile (14.5/km^{2}). There were 58 housing units at an average density of 38.2 per square mile (14.7/km^{2}). The racial makeup of the city was 98.2% White and 1.8% Native American. Hispanic or Latino of any race were 1.8% of the population.

There were 25 households, of which 20.0% had children under the age of 18 living with them, 52.0% were married couples living together, 8.0% had a female householder with no husband present, 8.0% had a male householder with no wife present, and 32.0% were non-families. 12.0% of all households were made up of individuals, and 4% had someone living alone who was 65 years of age or older. The average household size was 2.28 and the average family size was 2.53.

The median age in the city was 53.2 years. 17.5% of residents were under the age of 18; 3.6% were between the ages of 18 and 24; 21% were from 25 to 44; 31.6% were from 45 to 64; and 26.3% were 65 years of age or older. The gender makeup of the city was 50.9% male and 49.1% female.

=== 2000 census ===
As of the census of 2000, there were 50 people, 22 households, and 15 families living in the city. The population density was 33.1 inhabitants per square mile (12.8/km^{2}). There were 61 housing units at an average density of 40.3 per square mile (15.6/km^{2}). The racial makeup of the city was 100.00% White.

There were 22 households, out of which 9.1% had children under the age of 18 living with them, 68.2% were married couples living together, and 27.3% were non-families. 18.2% of all households were made up of individuals, and 9.1% had someone living alone who was 65 years of age or older. The average household size was 2.27 and the average family size was 2.44.

In the city, the population was spread out, with 14.0% under the age of 18, 10.0% from 18 to 24, 10.0% from 25 to 44, 36.0% from 45 to 64, and 30.0% who were 65 years of age or older. The median age was 52 years. For every 100 females, there were 117.4 males. For every 100 females age 18 and over, there were 115.0 males.

The median income for a household in the city was $51,250, and the median income for a family was $52,292. Males had a median income of $47,500 versus $31,875 for females. The per capita income for the city was $29,268. None of the population and none of the families were below the poverty line.

== Politics ==
Presidential election results

2020 Precinct Results Spreadsheet2016 Precinct Results Spreadsheet2012 Precinct Results Spreadsheet2008 Precinct Results Spreadsheet2004 Precinct Results Spreadsheet2000 Precinct Results Spreadsheet1996 Precinct Results1992 Precinct Results1988 Precinct Results1984 Precinct Results1980 Precinct Results1976 Precinct Results1968 Precinct Results1964 Precinct Results1960 Precinct Results
Year	Republican	Democratic	Third parties
2020	76.1% 35	23.9% 11	0.0% 0
2016	67.5% 27	27.5% 11	5.0% 2
2012	69.8% 30	30.2% 13	0.0% 0
2008	59.6% 31	38.5% 20	1.9% 1
2004	69.2% 36	30.8% 16	0.0% 0
2000	70.6% 36	25.5% 13	3.9% 2
1996	60.4% 29	22.9% 11	16.7% 8
1992	25.4% 15	20.3% 12	54.3% 32
1988	66.7% 32	33.3% 16	0.0% 0
1984	67.6% 25	32.4% 12	0.0% 0
1980	70.0% 35	20.0% 10	10.0% 5
1976	50.0% 26	44.2% 23	5.8% 3
1968	72.4% 21	27.6% 8	0.0% 0
1964	53.8% 14	46.2% 12	0.0% 0
1960	64.3% 18	35.7% 10	0.0% 0
