= Little Pine Township, Crow Wing County, Minnesota =

Township in Minnesota, United States

Little Pine Township
- Township
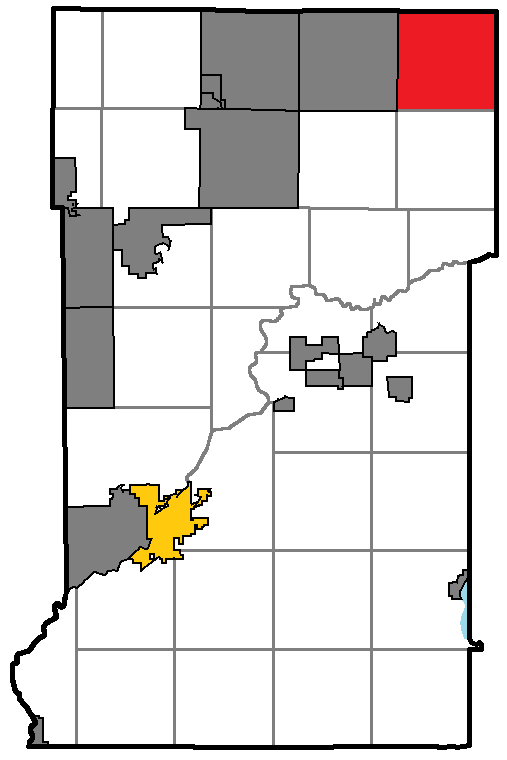
- Location of Little Pine Township, within Crow Wing County, Minnesota
- Coordinates: 46°45′3″N 93°50′6″W
- Country: United States
- State: Minnesota
- County: Crow Wing

Area
  - Total: 35.8 sq mi (92.7 km^{2})
  - Land: 34.5 sq mi (89.4 km^{2})
  - Water: 1.3 sq mi (3.4 km^{2})
- Elevation: 1,270 ft (387 m)

Population (2020)
  - Total: 87
  - Density: 2.5/sq mi (0.97/km^{2})
- Time zone: UTC-6 (Central (CST))
  - Summer (DST): UTC-5 (CDT)
- FIPS code: 27-37646
- GNIS feature ID: 0664804

Little Pine Township is a township in Crow Wing County, Minnesota, United States. The population was 87 at the 2020 census. Little Pine Township took its name from the Little Pine River.

== Geography ==
According to the United States Census Bureau, the township has a total area of 35.8 square miles (92.7 km^{2}), of which 34.5 square miles (89.4 km^{2}) is land and 1.3 square miles (3.4 km^{2}) (3.63%) is water.

== Demographics ==
As of the census of 2000, there were 86 people, 34 households, and 26 families residing in the township. The population density was 2.5 inhabitants per square mile (0.97/km^{2}). There were 88 housing units at an average density of 2.6 per square mile (1.0/km^{2}). The racial makeup of the township was 98.84% White and 1.16% Asian.

There were 34 households, out of which 20.6% had children under the age of 18 living with them, 58.8% were married couples living together, 8.8% had a female householder with no husband present, and 23.5% were non-families. 17.6% of all households were made up of individuals, and 2.9% had someone living alone who was 65 years of age or older. The average household size was 2.53 and the average family size was 2.88.

In the township the population was spread out, with 24.4% under the age of 18, 8.1% from 18 to 24, 12.8% from 25 to 44, 37.2% from 45 to 64, and 17.4% who were 65 years of age or older. The median age was 46 years. For every 100 females, there were 87.0 males. For every 100 females age 18 and over, there were 116.7 males.

The median income for a household in the township was $24,375, and the median income for a family was $26,250. Males had a median income of $35,938 versus $16,250 for females. The per capita income for the township was $12,602. There were 39.3% of families and 44.3% of the population living below the poverty line, including 67.7% of under eighteens and 54.5% of those over 64.
