= Gail Lake Township, Crow Wing County, Minnesota =

Township in Minnesota, United States

Gail Lake Township
- Township
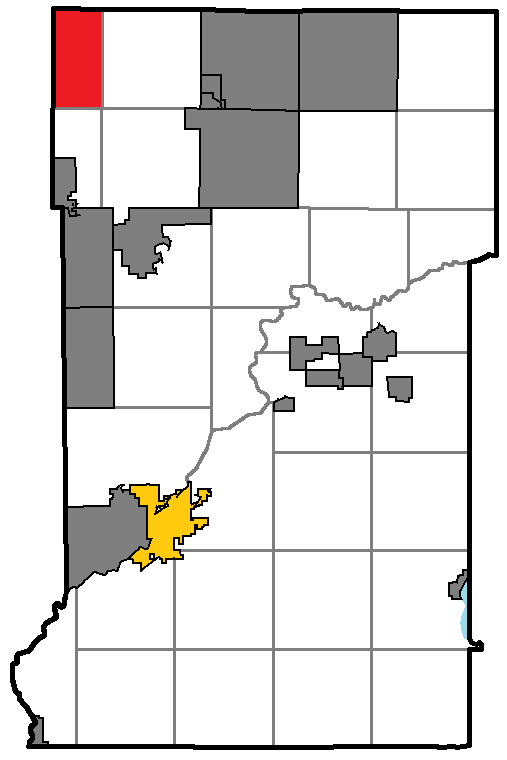
- Location of Gail Lake Township, within Crow Wing County, Minnesota
- Coordinates: 46°46′35″N 94°18′42″W
- Country: United States
- State: Minnesota
- County: Crow Wing

Area
  - Total: 18.1 sq mi (46.8 km^{2})
  - Land: 16.7 sq mi (43.2 km^{2})
  - Water: 1.4 sq mi (3.6 km^{2})
- Elevation: 1,335 ft (407 m)

Population (2020)
  - Total: 97
  - Density: 5.8/sq mi (2.2/km^{2})
- Time zone: UTC-6 (Central (CST))
  - Summer (DST): UTC-5 (CDT)
- FIPS code: 27-23012
- GNIS feature ID: 0664239

Gail Lake Township is a township in Crow Wing County, Minnesota, United States. The population was 97 at the 2020 census.

== Geography ==
According to the United States Census Bureau, the township has a total area of 18.1 square miles (47 km^{2}), of which 16.7 square miles (43 km^{2}) is land and 1.4 square miles (3.6 km^{2}) (7.74%) is water.

== Demographics ==
As of the census of 2000, there were 92 people, 43 households, and 27 families residing in the township. The population density was 5.5 inhabitants per square mile (2.1/km^{2}). There were 89 housing units at an average density of 5.3 per square mile (2.0/km^{2}). The racial makeup of the township was 97.83% White and 2.17% Asian.

There were 43 households, out of which 18.6% had children under the age of 18 living with them, 62.8% were married couples living together, and 34.9% were non-families. 34.9% of all households were made up of individuals, and 16.3% had someone living alone who was 65 years of age or older. The average household size was 2.14 and the average family size was 2.68.

In the township the population was spread out, with 15.2% under the age of 18, 6.5% from 18 to 24, 25.0% from 25 to 44, 33.7% from 45 to 64, and 19.6% who were 65 years of age or older. The median age was 47 years. For every 100 females, there were 114.0 males. For every 100 females age 18 and over, there were 116.7 males.

The median income for a household in the township was $30,625, and the median income for a family was $35,417. Males had a median income of $33,125 versus $18,750 for females. The per capita income for the township was $15,721. There were 7.4% of families and 7.6% of the population living below the poverty line, including no under eighteens and 15.4% of those over 64.
