= Pelican Township, Crow Wing County, Minnesota =

Township in Minnesota, United States

Pelican Township
- Township
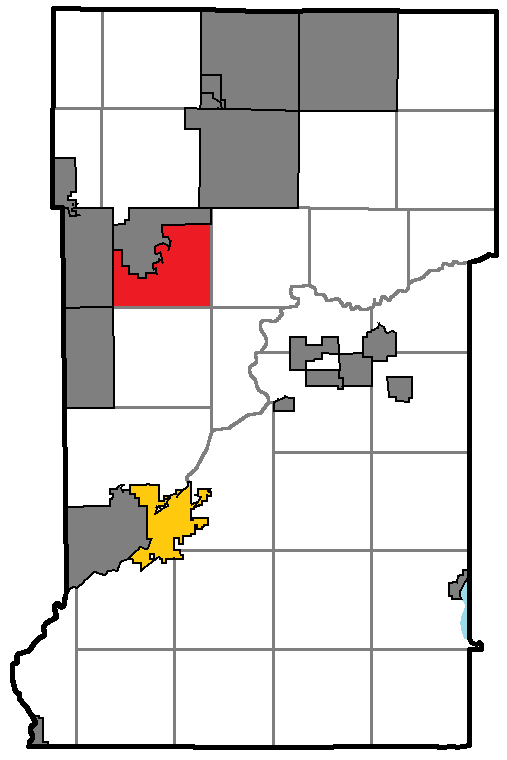
- Location of Pelican Township, within Crow Wing County, Minnesota
- Coordinates: 46°34′11″N 94°12′27″W
- Country: United States
- State: Minnesota
- County: Crow Wing

Area
  - Total: 19.3 sq mi (50.1 km^{2})
  - Land: 8.0 sq mi (20.6 km^{2})
  - Water: 11.4 sq mi (29.5 km^{2})
- Elevation: 1,224 ft (373 m)

Population (2020)
  - Total: 501
  - Density: 63.0/sq mi (24.3/km^{2})
- Time zone: UTC-6 (Central (CST))
  - Summer (DST): UTC-5 (CDT)
- FIPS code: 27-50092
- GNIS feature ID: 0665270
- Website: https://pelicantownship.us/

Pelican Township is a township in Crow Wing County, Minnesota, United States. The population was 501 at the 2020 census. This township was named from Pelican Lake.

== Geography ==
According to the United States Census Bureau, the township has a total area of 19.4 square miles (50.1 km^{2}), of which 8.0 square miles (20.6 km^{2}) is land and 11.4 square miles (29.5 km^{2}) (58.88%) is water. It is located on Lake Pelican, one of the largest lakes in the area.

== Demographics ==
As of the census of 2000, there were 400 people, 169 households, and 124 families residing in the township. The population density was 50.2 inhabitants per square mile (19.4/km^{2}). There were 464 housing units at an average density of 58.3 per square mile (22.5/km^{2}). The racial makeup of the township was 99.50% White, 0.25% African American and 0.25% Native American. Hispanic or Latino of any race were 0.75% of the population.

There were 169 households, out of which 24.3% had children under the age of 18 living with them, 66.9% were married couples living together, 1.8% had a female householder with no husband present, and 26.6% were non-families. 23.1% of all households were made up of individuals, and 13.0% had someone living alone who was 65 years of age or older. The average household size was 2.37 and the average family size was 2.73.

In the township the population was spread out, with 20.5% under the age of 18, 4.8% from 18 to 24, 19.0% from 25 to 44, 33.0% from 45 to 64, and 22.8% who were 65 years of age or older. The median age was 48 years. For every 100 females, there were 111.6 males. For every 100 females age 18 and over, there were 103.8 males.

The median income for a household in the township was $51,250, and the median income for a family was $60,469. Males had a median income of $36,750 versus $26,250 for females. The per capita income for the township was $24,495. About 4.1% of families and 7.7% of the population were below the poverty line, including 8.3% of those under age 18 and 10.1% of those age 65 or over.
