= Pelican Lake (Crow Wing County, Minnesota) =

Lake in the state of Minnesota, United States

- Location within Minnesota
- Location: Crow Wing County, Minnesota
- Coordinates: 46°34′34″N 94°10′34″W
- Type: lake

Pelican Lake was a lake in Crow Wing County, in the U.S. state of Minnesota.

Pelican Lake, a translation of the Ojibwe language name, was so named for the flocks of pelicans seen there.

== See also ==
- List of lakes in Minnesota
