= Rabbit Lake Township, Crow Wing County, Minnesota =

Township in Minnesota, United States

Rabbit Lake Township
- Township
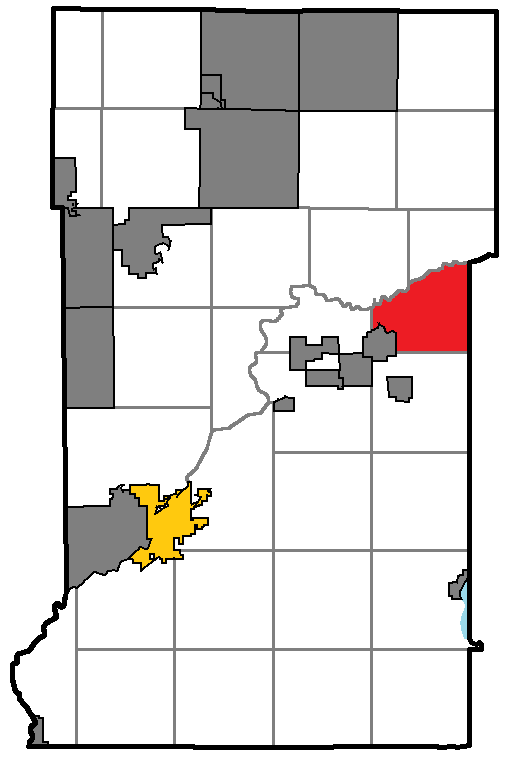
- Location of Rabbit Lake Township, within Crow Wing County, Minnesota
- Coordinates: 46°32′10″N 93°53′24″W
- Country: United States
- State: Minnesota
- County: Crow Wing

Area
  - Total: 24.1 sq mi (62.4 km^{2})
  - Land: 22.0 sq mi (57.0 km^{2})
  - Water: 2.1 sq mi (5.5 km^{2})
- Elevation: 1,217 ft (371 m)

Population (2020)
  - Total: 327
  - Density: 14.9/sq mi (5.74/km^{2})
- Time zone: UTC-6 (Central (CST))
  - Summer (DST): UTC-5 (CDT)
- FIPS code: 27-52855
- GNIS feature ID: 0665369

Rabbit Lake Township is a township in Crow Wing County, Minnesota, United States. The population was 327 at the 2020 census. The township took its name from Rabbit Lake.

== Geography ==
According to the United States Census Bureau, the township has a total area of 24.1 square miles (62.4 km^{2}), of which 22.0 square miles (57.0 km^{2}) is land and 2.1 square miles (5.5 km^{2}) (8.75%) is water.

== Demographics ==
At the 2000 census, there were 348 people, 121 households and 102 families residing in the township. The population density was 15.8 per square mile (6.1/km^{2}). There were 167 housing units at an average density of 7.6/sq mi (2.9/km^{2}). The racial makeup of the township was 99.71% White, and 0.29% from two or more races.

There were 121 households, of which 44.6% had children under the age of 18 living with them, 76.9% were married couples living together, 3.3% had a female householder with no husband present, and 15.7% were non-families. 11.6% of all households were made up of individuals, and 3.3% had someone living alone who was 65 years of age or older. The average household size was 2.88 and the average family size was 3.15.

28.4% of the population were under the age of 18, 5.5% from 18 to 24, 33.0% from 25 to 44, 23.3% from 45 to 64, and 9.8% who were 65 years of age or older. The median age was 39 years. For every 100 females, there were 109.6 males. For every 100 females age 18 and over, there were 111.0 males.

The median household income was $57,500 and the median family income was $58,750. Males had a median income of $39,375 and females $18,125. The per capita income was $20,041. About 3.5% of families and 3.7% of the population were below the poverty line, including 5.8% of those under age 18 and none of those age 65 or over.
