= St. Mathias Township, Crow Wing County, Minnesota =

Township in Minnesota, United States

St. Mathias Township
- Township
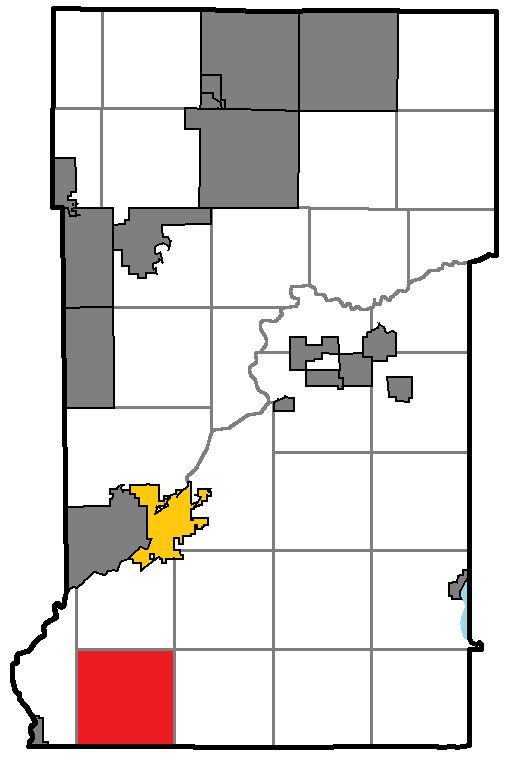
- Location of St. Mathias Township, within Crow Wing County, Minnesota
- Coordinates: 46°12′52″N 94°14′37″W
- Country: United States
- State: Minnesota
- County: Crow Wing

Area
  - Total: 36.1 sq mi (93.4 km^{2})
  - Land: 35.6 sq mi (92.1 km^{2})
  - Water: 0.46 sq mi (1.2 km^{2})
- Elevation: 1,227 ft (374 m)

Population (2020)
  - Total: 606
  - Density: 17.0/sq mi (6.58/km^{2})
- Time zone: UTC-6 (Central (CST))
  - Summer (DST): UTC-5 (CDT)
- FIPS code: 27-57328
- GNIS feature ID: 0665526
- Website: Township website

St. Mathias Township is a township in Crow Wing County, Minnesota, United States. The population was 606 at the 2020 census. St. Mathias Township took its name from a local Roman Catholic church.

== Geography ==
According to the United States Census Bureau, the township has a total area of 36.0 square miles (93.4 km^{2}), of which 35.6 square miles (92.1 km^{2}) is land and 0.5 square mile (1.2 km^{2}) (1.33%) is water.

== Demographics ==
As of the census of 2000, there were 490 people, 169 households, and 138 families residing in the township. The population density was 13.8 people per square mile (5.3/km^{2}). There were 192 housing units at an average density of 5.4/sq mi (2.1/km^{2}). The racial makeup of the township was 97.96% White, 0.41% African American, 0.20% Native American, 0.61% from other races, and 0.82% from two or more races. Hispanic or Latino of any race were 1.43% of the population.

There were 169 households, out of which 41.4% had children under the age of 18 living with them, 71.6% were married couples living together, 5.3% had a female householder with no husband present, and 18.3% were non-families. 14.2% of all households were made up of individuals, and 4.7% had someone living alone who was 65 years of age or older. The average household size was 2.90 and the average family size was 3.24.

In the township the population was spread out, with 32.2% under the age of 18, 6.1% from 18 to 24, 28.4% from 25 to 44, 24.3% from 45 to 64, and 9.0% who were 65 years of age or older. The median age was 34 years. For every 100 females, there were 105.0 males. For every 100 females age 18 and over, there were 108.8 males.

The median income for a household in the township was $43,462, and the median income for a family was $44,519. Males had a median income of $35,625 versus $20,938 for females. The per capita income for the township was $15,761. About 4.7% of families and 3.0% of the population were below the poverty line, including 0.6% of those under age 18 and 5.7% of those age 65 or over.
