= Long Lake Township, Crow Wing County, Minnesota =

Township in Minnesota, United States

Long Lake Township
- Township
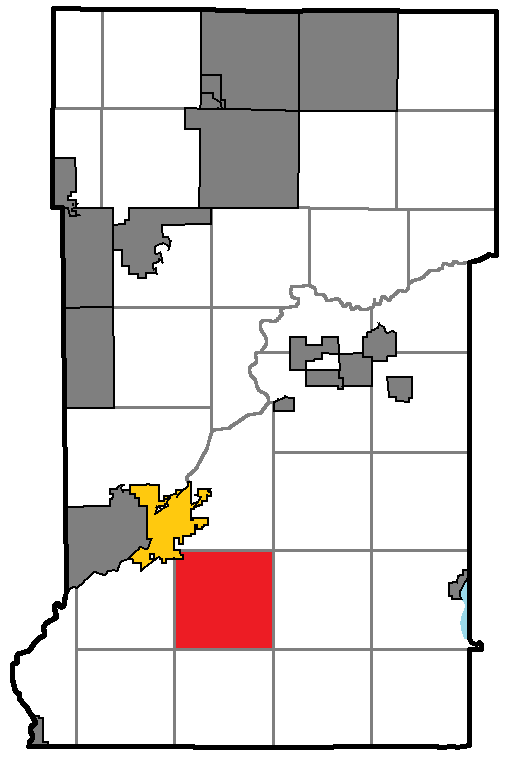
- Location of Long Lake Township, within Crow Wing County, Minnesota
- Coordinates: 46°16′53″N 94°7′35″W
- Country: United States
- State: Minnesota
- County: Crow Wing

Area
  - Total: 36.4 sq mi (94.3 km^{2})
  - Land: 34.2 sq mi (88.5 km^{2})
  - Water: 2.2 sq mi (5.8 km^{2})
- Elevation: 1,263 ft (385 m)

Population (2020)
  - Total: 1,111
  - Density: 32.5/sq mi (12.6/km^{2})
- Time zone: UTC-6 (Central (CST))
  - Summer (DST): UTC-5 (CDT)
- FIPS code: 27-37988
- GNIS feature ID: 0664817

Long Lake Township is a township in Crow Wing County, Minnesota, United States. The population was 1,111 at the 2020 census.

Long Lake is the English translation of the Ojibwe language name of the township's namesake lake.

== Geography ==
According to the United States Census Bureau, the township has a total area of 36.4 square miles (94.3 km^{2}), of which 34.2 square miles (88.5 km^{2}) is land and 2.2 square miles (5.8 km^{2}) (6.15%) is water.

== Demographics ==
As of the census of 2000, there were 1,025 people, 395 households, and 314 families residing in the township. The population density was 30.0 inhabitants per square mile (11.6/km^{2}). There were 546 housing units at an average density of 16.0 per square mile (6.2/km^{2}). The racial makeup of the township was 98.54% White, 0.59% Native American, 0.10% from other races, and 0.78% from two or more races. Hispanic or Latino of any race were 0.78% of the population.

There were 395 households, out of which 33.2% had children under the age of 18 living with them, 69.6% were married couples living together, 4.8% had a female householder with no husband present, and 20.3% were non-families. 16.5% of all households were made up of individuals, and 4.8% had someone living alone who was 65 years of age or older. The average household size was 2.59 and the average family size was 2.90.

In the township the population was spread out, with 24.7% under the age of 18, 7.4% from 18 to 24, 28.7% from 25 to 44, 24.2% from 45 to 64, and 15.0% who were 65 years of age or older. The median age was 39 years. For every 100 females, there were 107.1 males. For every 100 females age 18 and over, there were 109.8 males.

The median income for a household in the township was $44,297, and the median income for a family was $50,208. Males had a median income of $35,313 versus $23,750 for females. The per capita income for the township was $24,136. About 3.2% of families and 4.0% of the population were below the poverty line, including 2.9% of those under age 18 and 1.3% of those age 65 or over.
