= Emily, Minnesota =

City in Minnesota, United States

Emily
- City
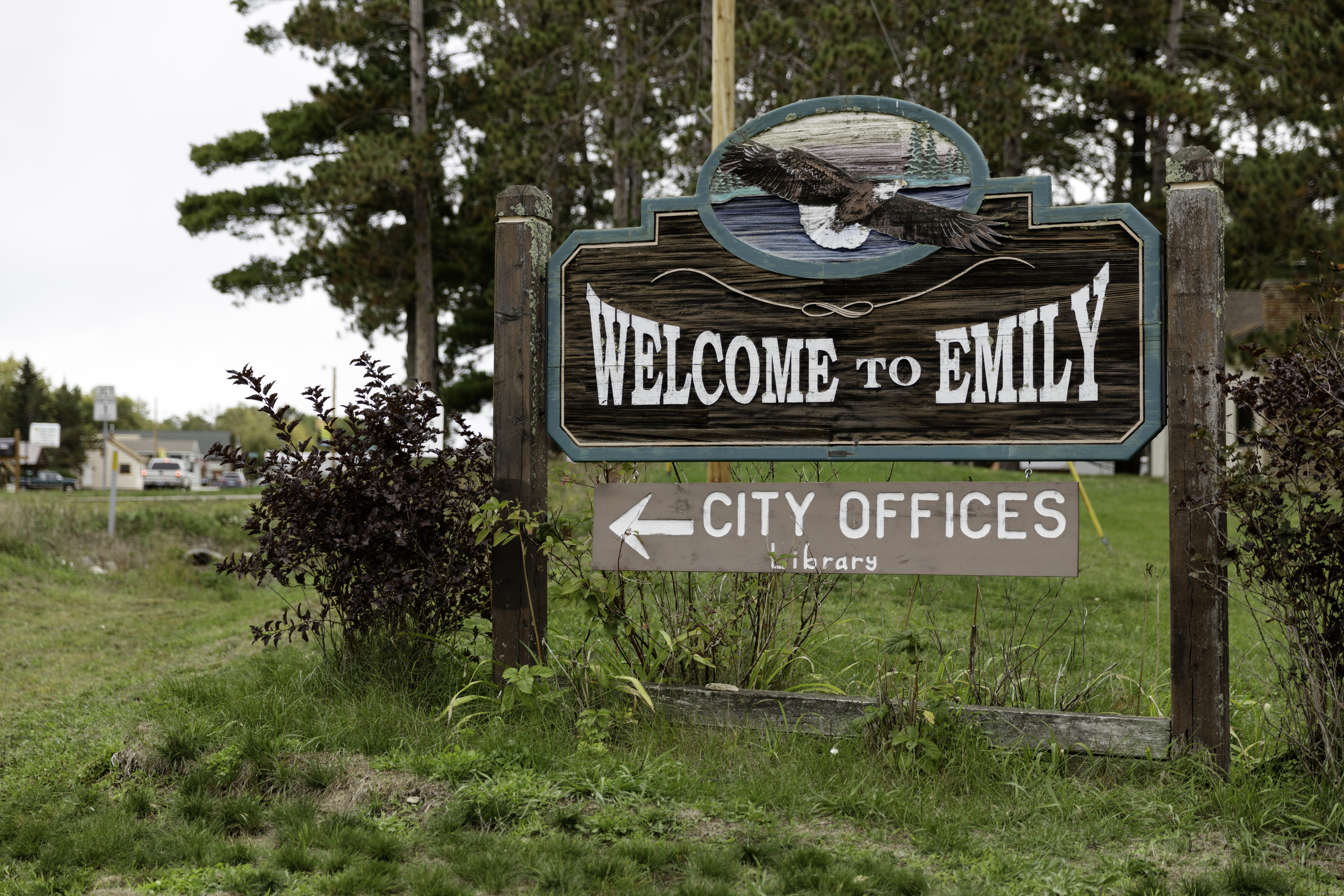
- Welcome to Emily sign
- Motto: "Land Of Lakes & Pines"
- Location of Emily within Crow Wing County, Minnesota
- Coordinates: 46°45′37″N 93°58′00″W
- Country: United States
- State: Minnesota
- County: Crow Wing
- Platted: November 22, 1905
- Incorporated: March 7, 1957

Government
  - Mayor: Tracy Jones

Area
  - Total: 36.06 sq mi (93.39 km^{2})
  - Land: 29.98 sq mi (77.65 km^{2})
  - Water: 6.08 sq mi (15.74 km^{2})
- Elevation: 1,293 ft (394 m)

Population (2020)
  - Total: 843
  - Estimate (2022): 862
  - Density: 28.1/sq mi (10.86/km^{2})
- Time zone: UTC−6 (Central (CST))
  - Summer (DST): UTC−5 (CDT)
- ZIP Code: 56447
- Area code: 218
- FIPS code: 27-19286
- GNIS feature ID: 2394686
- Sales tax: 7.375%
- Website: cityofemily.com

Emily is a city in Crow Wing County, Minnesota, United States. The population was 843 at the 2020 census. It is part of the Brainerd Micropolitan Statistical Area.

Minnesota State Highway 6 and Crow Wing County Road 1 are the main routes in the community.

== History ==
The city of Emily was named for the nearby Emily Lake. It was platted on November 22, 1905. It was incorporated on March 7, 1957. The post office at Emily began in 1900.

== Geography ==
According to the United States Census Bureau, the city has an area of 36.08 square miles (93.45 km^{2}), of which 30.00 square miles (77.70 km^{2}) is land and 6.08 square miles (15.75 km^{2}) is water. Emily is in northeastern Crow Wing County.

== Demographics ==
Historical population
Census	Pop.	Note	%±
1960	351		—
1970	386		10.0%
1980	588		52.3%
1990	613		4.3%
2000	847		38.2%
2010	813		−4.0%
2020	843		3.7%
2022 (est.)	862		2.3%
U.S. Decennial Census; 2020 Census

=== 2010 census ===
As of the census of 2010, there were 813 people, 368 households, and 237 families living in the city. The population density was 27.1 inhabitants per square mile (10.5/km^{2}). There were 1,055 housing units at an average density of 35.2 per square mile (13.6/km^{2}). The racial makeup of the city was 97.4% White, 0.2% African American, 0.2% Native American, 0.1% from other races, and 2.0% from two or more races. Hispanic or Latino of any race were 0.9% of the population.

There were 368 households, of which 18.5% had children under the age of 18 living with them, 54.6% were married couples living together, 4.9% had a female householder with no husband present, 4.9% had a male householder with no wife present, and 35.6% were non-families. 31.0% of all households were made up of individuals, and 14.9% had someone living alone who was 65 years of age or older. The average household size was 2.21 and the average family size was 2.73.

The median age in the city was 52.8 years. 18.3% of residents were under the age of 18; 5% were between the ages of 18 and 24; 15.4% were from 25 to 44; 31.2% were from 45 to 64; and 30.1% were 65 years of age or older. The gender makeup of the city was 50.4% male and 49.6% female.

=== 2000 census ===
As of the census of 2000, there were 847 people, 368 households, and 243 families living in the city. The population density was 28.2 inhabitants per square mile (10.9/km^{2}). There were 876 housing units at an average density of 29.2 per square mile (11.3/km^{2}). The racial makeup of the city was 97.87% White, 0.24% African American, 0.94% Native American, 0.24% Asian, and 0.71% from two or more races. Hispanic or Latino of any race were 0.71% of the population.

There were 368 households, out of which 21.7% had children under the age of 18 living with them, 58.4% were married couples living together, 4.3% had a female householder with no husband present, and 33.7% were non-families. 30.7% of all households were made up of individuals, and 17.4% had someone living alone who was 65 years of age or older. The average household size was 2.30 and the average family size was 2.85.

In the city, the population was spread out, with 22.4% under the age of 18, 4.8% from 18 to 24, 19.1% from 25 to 44, 29.0% from 45 to 64, and 24.6% who were 65 years of age or older. The median age was 48 years. For every 100 females, there were 102.6 males. For every 100 females age 18 and over, there were 99.1 males.

The median income for a household in the city was $34,276, and the median income for a family was $37,750. Males had a median income of $30,000 versus $23,068 for females. The per capita income for the city was $17,854. About 3.9% of families and 7.7% of the population were below the poverty line, including 9.9% of those under age 18 and 9.5% of those age 65 or over.
