= Daggett Brook Township, Crow Wing County, Minnesota =

Township in Minnesota, United States

Daggett Brook Township
- Township
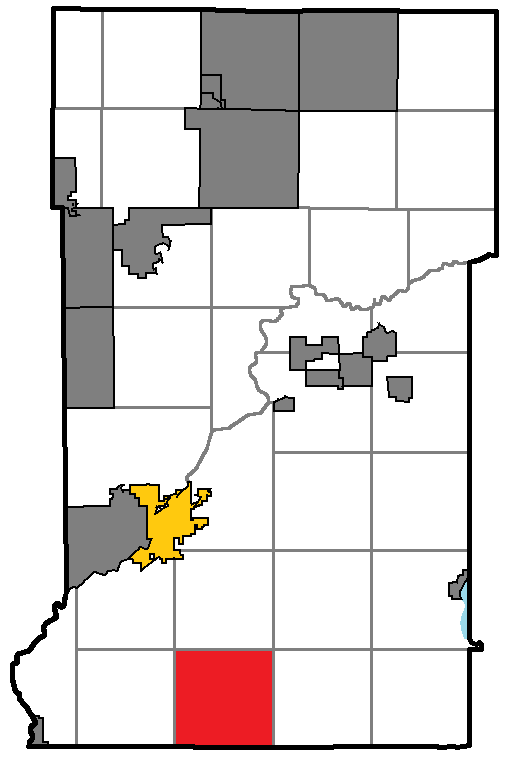
- Location of Daggett Brook Township, within Crow Wing County, Minnesota
- Coordinates: 46°12′25″N 94°6′51″W
- Country: United States
- State: Minnesota
- County: Crow Wing

Area
  - Total: 36.4 sq mi (94.3 km^{2})
  - Land: 36.3 sq mi (94.1 km^{2})
  - Water: 0.077 sq mi (0.2 km^{2})
- Elevation: 1,230 ft (375 m)

Population (2020)
  - Total: 551
  - Density: 15.2/sq mi (5.86/km^{2})
- Time zone: UTC-6 (Central (CST))
  - Summer (DST): UTC-5 (CDT)
- FIPS code: 27-14464
- GNIS feature ID: 0663912

Daggett Brook Township is a township in Crow Wing County, Minnesota, United States. The population was 551 at the 2020 census. This township took its name from Daggett Brook.

== Geography ==
According to the United States Census Bureau, the township has a total area of 36.4 square miles (94 km^{2}), of which 36.3 square miles (94 km^{2}) is land and 0.1 square miles (0.26 km^{2}) (0.22%) is water.

== Demographics ==
As of the census of 2000, there were 448 people, 155 households, and 123 families residing in the township. The population density was 12.3 inhabitants per square mile (4.7/km^{2}). There were 167 housing units at an average density of 4.6 per square mile (1.8/km^{2}). The racial makeup of the township was 98.44% White, 0.67% Native American, 0.22% Asian, 0.22% from other races, and 0.45% from two or more races. Hispanic or Latino of any race were 0.67% of the population.

There were 155 households, out of which 40.0% had children under the age of 18 living with them, 70.3% were married couples living together, 2.6% had a female householder with no husband present, and 20.6% were non-families. 16.8% of all households were made up of individuals, and 5.8% had someone living alone who was 65 years of age or older. The average household size was 2.89 and the average family size was 3.25.

In the township the population was spread out, with 29.9% under the age of 18, 8.7% from 18 to 24, 27.9% from 25 to 44, 23.7% from 45 to 64, and 9.8% who were 65 years of age or older. The median age was 34 years. For every 100 females, there were 110.3 males. For every 100 females age 18 and over, there were 113.6 males.

The median income for a household in the township was $46,250, and the median income for a family was $46,563. Males had a median income of $32,188 versus $18,333 for females. The per capita income for the township was $17,820. About 9.2% of families and 12.3% of the population were below the poverty line, including 15.9% of those under age 18 and 36.4% of those age 65 or over.
