= Daggett Brook =

Stream in Crow Wing County, Minnesota, U.S.

Coordinates: 46°12′27″N 94°07′38″W

Daggett Brook is a stream in southern Crow Wing County in the U.S. state of Minnesota. It is a tributary of the Nokasippi River.

Daggett Brook was named for Benjamin F. Daggett, a lumberjack who felled trees there.
