= Timothy Township, Crow Wing County, Minnesota =

Township in Minnesota, United States

Timothy Township
- Township
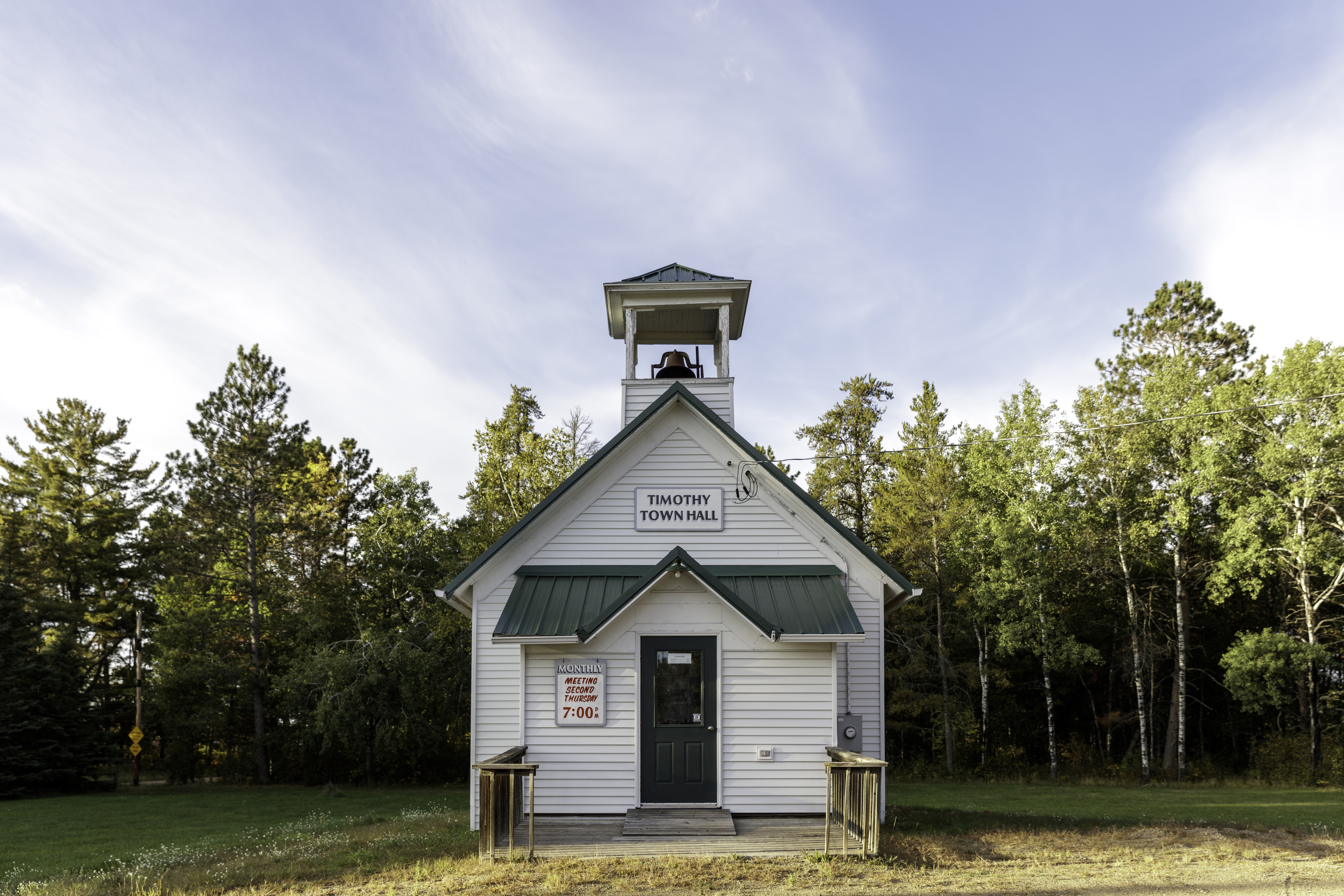
- Timothy Town Hall in Crow Wing County

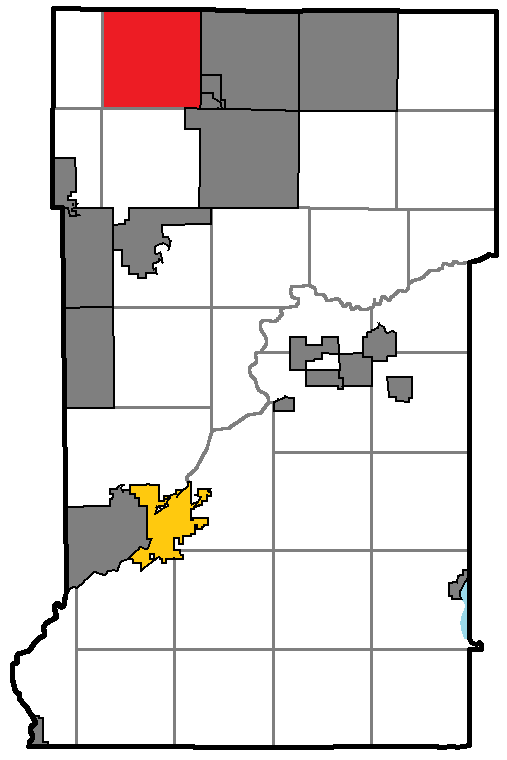
- Location of Timothy Township, within Crow Wing County, Minnesota
- Coordinates: 46°44′30″N 94°11′22″W
- Country: United States
- State: Minnesota
- County: Crow Wing

Area
  - Total: 35.6 sq mi (92.2 km^{2})
  - Land: 34.1 sq mi (88.4 km^{2})
  - Water: 1.5 sq mi (3.8 km^{2})
- Elevation: 1,407 ft (429 m)

Population (2020)
  - Total: 169
  - Density: 4.95/sq mi (1.91/km^{2})
- Time zone: UTC-6 (Central (CST))
  - Summer (DST): UTC-5 (CDT)
- FIPS code: 27-64930
- GNIS feature ID: 0665789
- Website: https://timothytownship.wordpress.com/

Timothy Township is a township in Crow Wing County, Minnesota, United States. The population was 169 at the 2020 census. The township may be named for its Timothy-grass.

== Geography ==
According to the United States Census Bureau, the township has a total area of 35.6 square miles (92.2 km^{2}), of which 34.1 square miles (88.4 km^{2}) is land and 1.5 square miles (3.8 km^{2}) (4.13%) is water.

== Demographics ==
As of the census of 2000, there were 147 people, 61 households, and 43 families residing in the township. The population density was 4.3 inhabitants per square mile (1.7/km^{2}). There were 122 housing units at an average density of 3.6 per square mile (1.4/km^{2}). The racial makeup of the township was 99.32% White and 0.68% Asian.

There were 61 households, out of which 29.5% had children under the age of 18 living with them, 63.9% were married couples living together, 3.3% had a female householder with no husband present, and 29.5% were non-families. 27.9% of all households were made up of individuals, and 13.1% had someone living alone who was 65 years of age or older. The average household size was 2.41 and the average family size was 2.95.

In the township the population was spread out, with 24.5% under the age of 18, 6.1% from 18 to 24, 25.9% from 25 to 44, 30.6% from 45 to 64, and 12.9% who were 65 years of age or older. The median age was 39 years. For every 100 females, there were 101.4 males. For every 100 females age 18 and over, there were 101.8 males.

The median income for a household in the township was $37,273, and the median income for a family was $44,375. Males had a median income of $29,750 versus $19,167 for females. The per capita income for the township was $36,103. There were 4.1% of families and 9.5% of the population living below the poverty line, including 18.9% of under eighteens and 7.7% of those over 64.
