= Oak Lawn Township, Crow Wing County, Minnesota =

Township in Minnesota, United States

Oak Lawn Township
- Township
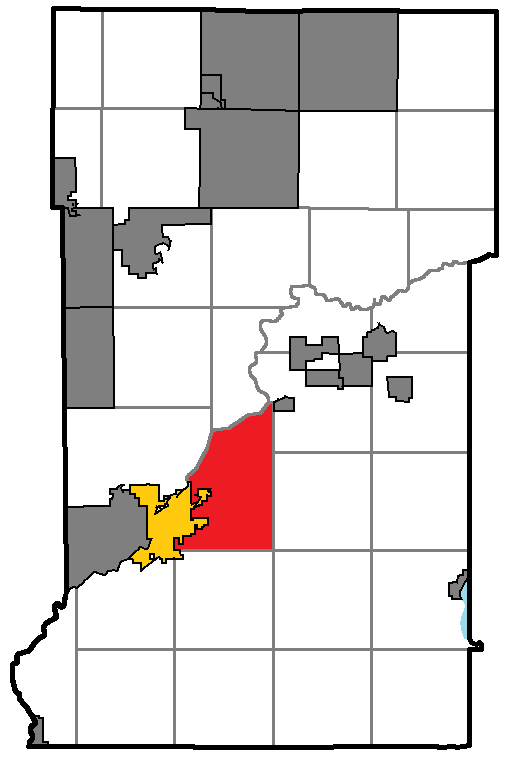
- Location of Oak Lawn Township, within Crow Wing County, Minnesota
- Coordinates: 46°23′12″N 94°7′19″W
- Country: United States
- State: Minnesota
- County: Crow Wing

Area
  - Total: 37.5 sq mi (97.1 km^{2})
  - Land: 35.1 sq mi (90.9 km^{2})
  - Water: 2.4 sq mi (6.2 km^{2})
- Elevation: 1,210 ft (370 m)

Population (2020)
  - Total: 1,764
  - Density: 50.3/sq mi (19.4/km^{2})
- Time zone: UTC-6 (Central (CST))
  - Summer (DST): UTC-5 (CDT)
- FIPS code: 27-47824
- GNIS feature ID: 0665190
- Website: https://www.oaklawntownship-mn.gov/

Oak Lawn Township is a township in Crow Wing County, Minnesota, United States. The population was 1,764 at the 2020 census.

== History ==
Oak Lawn Township was named for the clearings in the otherwise dense oak forest.

== Geography ==
According to the United States Census Bureau, the township has a total area of 37.5 square miles (97.1 km^{2}), of which 35.1 square miles (90.9 km^{2}) is land and 2.4 square miles (6.2 km^{2}) (6.38%) is water.

== Demographics ==
As of the census of 2000, there were 1,793 people, 586 households, and 458 families residing in the township. The population density was 51.1 inhabitants per square mile (19.7/km^{2}). There were 627 housing units at an average density of 17.9/sq mi (6.9/km^{2}). The racial makeup of the township was 95.26% White, 0.33% African American, 3.12% Native American, 0.17% Asian, 0.28% from other races, and 0.84% from two or more races. Hispanic or Latino of any race were 0.50% of the population.

There were 586 households, out of which 36.3% had children under the age of 18 living with them, 65.4% were married couples living together, 8.2% had a female householder with no husband present, and 21.7% were non-families. 16.7% of all households were made up of individuals, and 6.5% had someone living alone who was 65 years of age or older. The average household size was 2.71 and the average family size was 3.01.

In the township the population was spread out, with 24.1% under the age of 18, 9.4% from 18 to 24, 27.9% from 25 to 44, 25.8% from 45 to 64, and 12.8% who were 65 years of age or older. The median age was 38 years. For every 100 females, there were 110.7 males. For every 100 females age 18 and over, there were 109.4 males.

The median income for a household in the township was $45,388, and the median income for a family was $48,583. Males had a median income of $33,043 versus $22,448 for females. The per capita income for the township was $16,599. About 4.1% of families and 5.0% of the population were below the poverty line, including 4.8% of those under age 18 and 6.0% of those age 65 or over.
