= Roosevelt Township, Crow Wing County, Minnesota =

Township in Minnesota, United States

Roosevelt Township
- Township
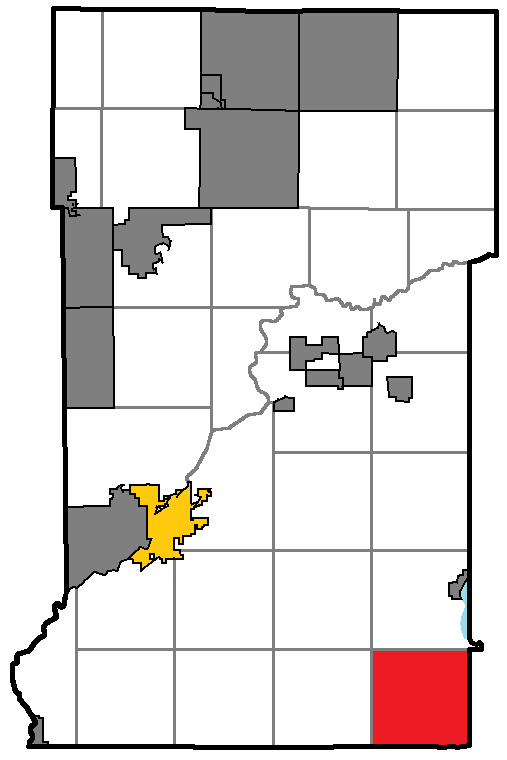
- Location of Roosevelt Township, within Crow Wing County, Minnesota
- Coordinates: 46°11′48″N 93°52′14″W
- Country: United States
- State: Minnesota
- County: Crow Wing

Area
  - Total: 36.4 sq mi (94.2 km^{2})
  - Land: 31.1 sq mi (80.6 km^{2})
  - Water: 5.3 sq mi (13.6 km^{2})
- Elevation: 1,329 ft (405 m)

Population (2020)
  - Total: 582
  - Density: 18.7/sq mi (7.22/km^{2})
- Time zone: UTC-6 (Central (CST))
  - Summer (DST): UTC-5 (CDT)
- FIPS code: 27-55420
- GNIS feature ID: 0665455
- Website: https://www.roosevelttownshipccmn.gov/

Roosevelt Township is a township in Crow Wing County, Minnesota, United States. The population was 582 at the 2020 census. Roosevelt Township was named for Theodore Roosevelt, 26th President of the United States.

== Geography ==
According to the United States Census Bureau, the township has a total area of 36.4 square miles (94.2 km^{2}), of which 31.1 square miles (80.6 km^{2}) is land and 5.2 square miles (13.6 km^{2}) (14.41%) is water.

== Demographics ==
As of the census of 2000, there were 534 people, 226 households, and 159 families residing in the township. The population density was 17.2 people per square mile (6.6/km^{2}). There were 637 housing units at an average density of 20.5/sq mi (7.9/km^{2}). The racial makeup of the township was 92.51% White, 0.19% African American, 5.62% Native American, and 1.69% from two or more races. Hispanic or Latino of any race were 0.37% of the population.

There were 226 households, out of which 23.9% had children under the age of 18 living with them, 62.8% were married couples living together, 5.3% had a female householder with no husband present, and 29.6% were non-families. 24.8% of all households were made up of individuals, and 8.0% had someone living alone who was 65 years of age or older. The average household size was 2.36 and the average family size was 2.76.

In the township the population was spread out, with 21.0% under the age of 18, 5.8% from 18 to 24, 19.9% from 25 to 44, 35.4% from 45 to 64, and 18.0% who were 65 years of age or older. The median age was 47 years. For every 100 females, there were 108.6 males. For every 100 females age 18 and over, there were 110.0 males.

The median income for a household in the township was $32,500, and the median income for a family was $38,571. Males had a median income of $30,417 versus $21,442 for females. The per capita income for the township was $18,417. About 7.6% of families and 14.7% of the population were below the poverty line, including 23.3% of those under age 18 and 8.7% of those age 65 or over.
