= Irondale Township, Crow Wing County, Minnesota =

Township in Minnesota, United States

Irondale Township
- Township
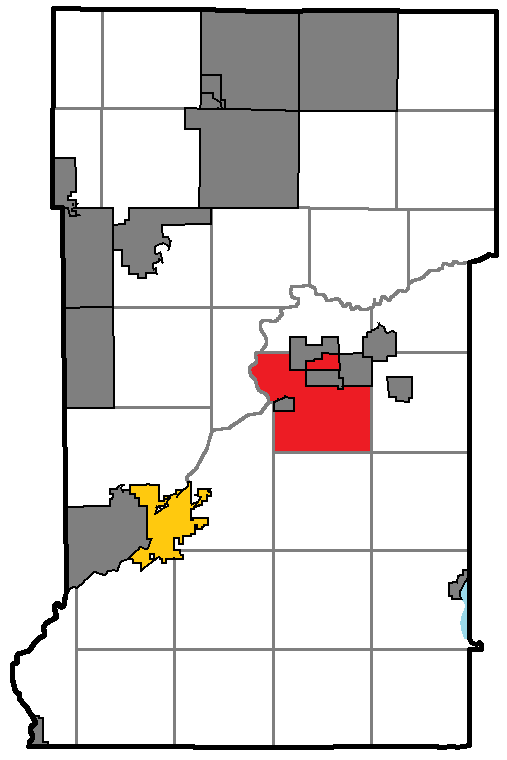
- Location of Irondale Township, within Crow Wing County, Minnesota
- Coordinates: 46°28′15″N 94°0′5″W
- Country: United States
- State: Minnesota
- County: Crow Wing

Area
  - Total: 31.1 sq mi (80.5 km^{2})
  - Land: 27.8 sq mi (72.1 km^{2})
  - Water: 3.2 sq mi (8.4 km^{2})
- Elevation: 1,260 ft (384 m)

Population (2020)
  - Total: 1,262
  - Density: 45.3/sq mi (17.5/km^{2})
- Time zone: UTC-6 (Central (CST))
  - Summer (DST): UTC-5 (CDT)
- FIPS code: 27-31202
- GNIS feature ID: 0664554
- Website: Township website

Irondale Township is a township in Crow Wing County, Minnesota, United States. The population was 1,262 at the 2020 census.

== Geography ==
According to the United States Census Bureau, the township has a total area of 31.1 square miles (81 km^{2}), of which 27.8 square miles (72 km^{2}) is land and 3.2 square miles (8.3 km^{2}) (10.45%) is water.

== Demographics ==
As of the census of 2000, there were 1,113 people, 430 households, and 310 families residing in the township. The population density was 40.0 inhabitants per square mile (15.4/km^{2}). There were 542 housing units at an average density of 19.5 per square mile (7.5/km^{2}). The racial makeup of the township was 98.56% White, 0.27% African American, 0.27% Native American, 0.18% Asian, 0.18% from other races, and 0.54% from two or more races. Hispanic or Latino of any race were 0.27% of the population.

There were 430 households, out of which 32.3% had children under the age of 18 living with them, 64.2% were married couples living together, 4.4% had a female householder with no husband present, and 27.9% were non-families. 23.0% of all households were made up of individuals, and 11.9% had someone living alone who was 65 years of age or older. The average household size was 2.59 and the average family size was 3.07.

In the township the population was spread out, with 26.1% under the age of 18, 6.0% from 18 to 24, 24.8% from 25 to 44, 27.2% from 45 to 64, and 15.8% who were 65 years of age or older. The median age was 42 years. For every 100 females, there were 103.1 males. For every 100 females age 18 and over, there were 98.1 males.

The median income for a household in the township was $40,625, and the median income for a family was $46,477. Males had a median income of $32,500 versus $20,385 for females. The per capita income for the township was $17,968. About 1.7% of families and 4.0% of the population were below the poverty line, including 5.9% of those under age 18 and 2.3% of those age 65 or over.
