= Crow Wing Township, Crow Wing County, Minnesota =

Township in Minnesota, United States

Crow Wing Township
- Township
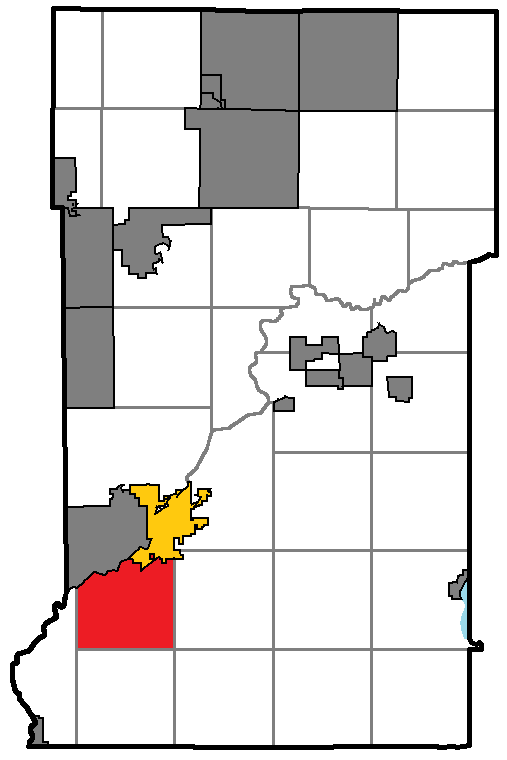
- Location of Crow Wing Township, within Crow Wing County, Minnesota
- Coordinates: 46°17′45″N 94°15′31″W
- Country: United States
- State: Minnesota
- County: Crow Wing

Area
  - Total: 30.8 sq mi (79.8 km^{2})
  - Land: 30.5 sq mi (79.0 km^{2})
  - Water: 0.31 sq mi (0.8 km^{2})
- Elevation: 1,210 ft (370 m)

Population (2020)
  - Total: 2,149
  - Density: 70.5/sq mi (27.2/km^{2})
- Time zone: UTC-6 (Central (CST))
  - Summer (DST): UTC-5 (CDT)
- FIPS code: 27-14122
- GNIS feature ID: 0663900
- Website: https://crowwingtownship.gov/

Crow Wing Township is a township in Crow Wing County, Minnesota, United States. The population was 2,149 at the 2020 census.

Crow Wing Township was named after a former Indian village within its borders.

== Geography ==
According to the United States Census Bureau, the township has a total area of 30.8 square miles (80 km^{2}), of which 30.5 square miles (79 km^{2}) is land and 0.3 square miles (0.78 km^{2}) (1.04%) is water.

== Demographics ==
As of the census of 2000, there were 1,212 people, 417 households, and 334 families residing in the township. The population density was 39.7 inhabitants per square mile (15.3/km^{2}). There were 438 housing units at an average density of 14.4 per square mile (5.6/km^{2}). The racial makeup of the township was 96.62% White, 0.66% African American, 0.91% Native American, 0.17% Asian, 1.24% from other races, and 0.41% from two or more races. Hispanic or Latino of any race were 1.73% of the population.

There were 417 households, out of which 43.9% had children under the age of 18 living with them, 63.8% were married couples living together, 10.8% had a female householder with no husband present, and 19.7% were non-families. 16.1% of all households were made up of individuals, and 4.6% had someone living alone who was 65 years of age or older. The average household size was 2.89 and the average family size was 3.21.

In the township the population was spread out, with 32.0% under the age of 18, 8.0% from 18 to 24, 29.4% from 25 to 44, 23.3% from 45 to 64, and 7.3% who were 65 years of age or older. The median age was 35 years. For every 100 females, there were 107.2 males. For every 100 females age 18 and over, there were 106.0 males.

The median income for a household in the township was $39,417, and the median income for a family was $42,174. Males had a median income of $31,713 versus $21,845 for females. The per capita income for the township was $16,139. About 6.1% of families and 9.3% of the population were below the poverty line, including 9.9% of those under age 18 and 12.2% age 65 or over.
