= Crow Wing County, Minnesota =

County in Minnesota, United States

- County
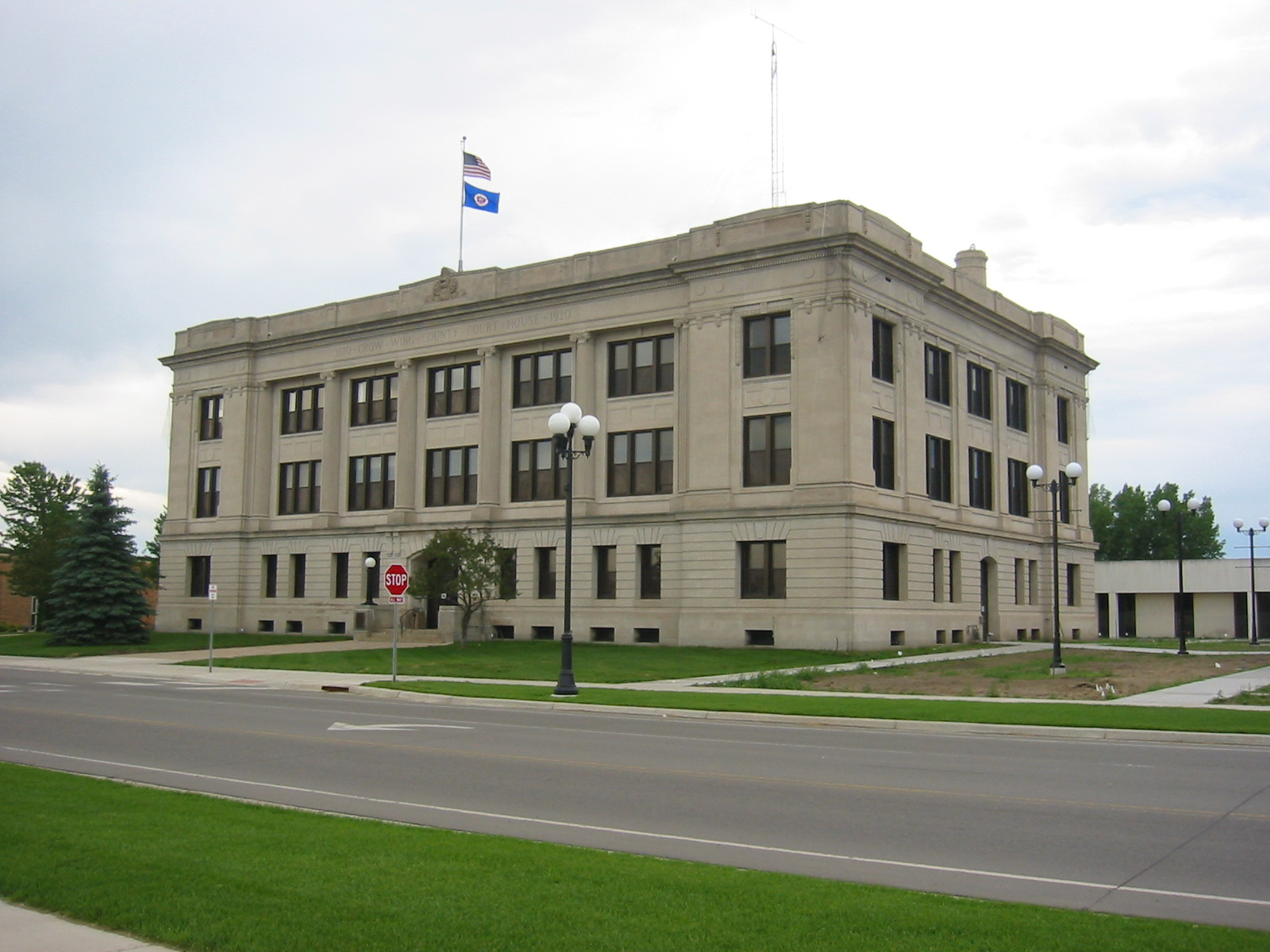
- Historic Crow Wing County Courthouse

- Location within the U.S. state of Minnesota
- Coordinates: 46°29′N 94°04′W
- Country: United States
- State: Minnesota
- Created: May 23
- Organized: March 3, 1870
- Named for: Crow Wing River
- Seat: Brainerd
- Largest city: Brainerd

Area
  - Total: 1,157 sq mi (3,000 km^{2})
  - Land: 999 sq mi (2,590 km^{2})
  - Water: 157 sq mi (410 km^{2}) 14%

Population (2020)
  - Total: 66,123
  - Estimate (2025): 69,132 ▲
  - Density: 66.2/sq mi (25.6/km^{2})
- Time zone: UTC−6 (Central)
  - Summer (DST): UTC−5 (CDT)
- Congressional district: 8th
- Website: www.crowwing.gov

Crow Wing County is a county in the East Central part of the U.S. state of Minnesota. As of the 2020 census, the population was 66,123. Its county seat is Brainerd. The county was formed in 1857, and was organized in 1870.

Crow Wing County is included in the Brainerd Micropolitan Statistical Area.

== History ==
This area was long occupied by the Ojibwe people, also known as the Chippewa. In addition, numerous Dakota people lived in central and southern Minnesota before European settlement. European Americans established a trading post by 1837 in this area, on the east side of the Mississippi River opposite the mouth of the Crow Wing River. The post (named Crow Wing) soon became a center of trading with the region's Native Americans, with a general-supply store that served the area. By 1866, the village contained about 600 whites and Ojibwe; it was a major population center. The territorial government enacted the county's creation on May 23, 1857, and named Crow Wing the county seat. The governmental structure of the county was not effected until March 3, 1870. The county was named for the river, which is named for an island in the river that resembles a crow's wing.

Brainerd township was founded in 1870 when the Northern Pacific Railroad selected the site for a crossing of the Mississippi River. It attracted development and population, soon surpassing Crow Wing. It was also designated as the new county seat, drawing more residents and businesses from what became known as a ghost town, Old Crow Wing. Crow Wing State Park encompasses much of the former village site along the river.

Brainerd City was incorporated on November 19, 1881, named for Lawrence Brainerd, the father-in-law of J. Gregory Smith, the first president of the Northern Pacific Railroad Company. Smith served as governor of Vermont from 1863 to 1865 before moving west. He is called the father and founder of Brainerd. Lawrence Brainerd was the first president of the Vermont Central Railroad. The Northern Pacific Railroad ran a special train as its first service to Brainerd on March 11, 1871. Its regular passenger service began the next September. The first passenger train from the Twin Cities, by way of Sauk Rapids, arrived on November 1, 1877.

On February 18, 1887, the Minnesota legislature annexed part of Cass County (west of the Mississippi) to Crow Wing County, which doubled the former area of Crow Wing County.

Soils of Crow Wing County

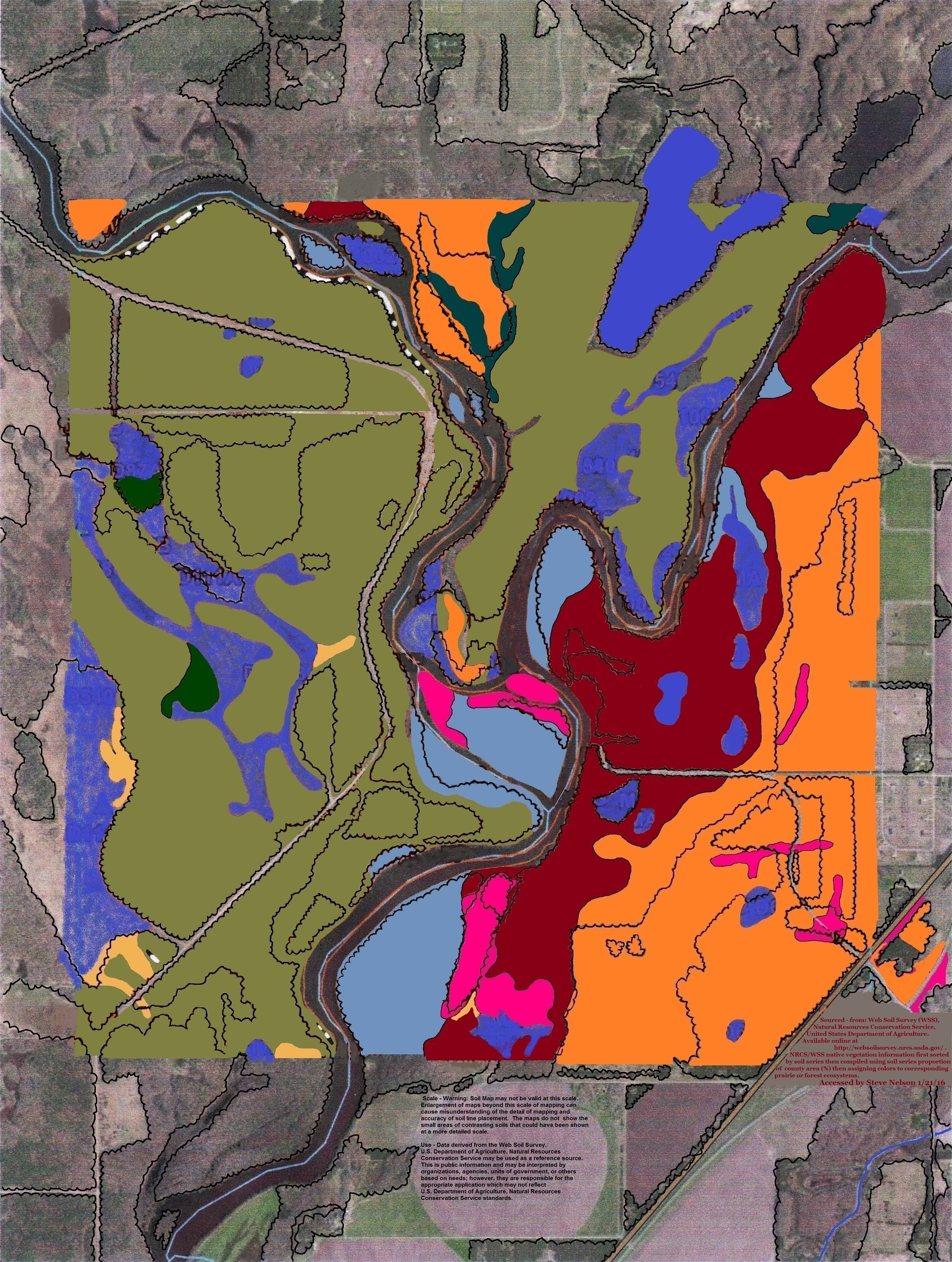
Soils of Crow Wing State Park neighborhood

== Geography ==
Crow Wing County has an area of 1,157 square miles (3,000 km^{2}), of which 999 square miles (2,590 km^{2}) is land and 157 square miles (410 km^{2}) (14%) is water.

=== Topography and vegetation ===
Crow Wing County has two state forests, the Crow Wing State Forest and the Emily State Forest. The Cuyuna Lakes State Trail lies in the Upper Mississippi River Basin. The topography is gently rolling to flat, mostly wooded and heavily dotted with waters and wetlands. It is home to an abundance of wildlife, including white-tailed deer, cottontail rabbit, snowshoe hare, raccoon, red fox, gray fox, coyote, mink, muskrat, squirrels, beaver, occasional American black bear, Bald eagle, osprey and many other waterfowl.

=== Lakes and rivers ===
The main river is the Mississippi River, and there are several smaller streams. It has about 417 recognized lakes. The top ten by size are:

1. Gull Lake – 9,419 acres (38.12 km^{2})
2. Pelican Lake – 8,254 acres (33.40 km^{2})
3. Upper and Lower White Fish Lake – 7,372 acres (29.83 km^{2})
4. North Long Lake – 5,997 acres (24.27 km^{2})
5. Lake Edward – 2,576 acres (10.42 km^{2})
6. Bay Lake – 2,393 acres (9.68 km^{2})
7. Cross Lake – 1,752 acres (7.09 km^{2})
8. Round Lake – 1,645 acres (6.66 km^{2})
9. Big Trout Lake – 1,343 acres (5.43 km^{2})
10. Lower South Long Lake – 1,312 acres (5.31 km^{2})

=== Major highways ===
- U.S. Route 169
- Minnesota State Highway 6
- Minnesota State Highway 18
- Minnesota State Highway 25
- Minnesota State Highway 210
- Minnesota State Highway 371
- Bus. MN 371

=== Adjacent counties ===
- Aitkin County – northeast
- Mille Lacs County – southeast
- Morrison County – southwest
- Cass County – northwest, north

=== Protected areas ===
- Crow Wing State Forest
- Crow Wing State Park (part)
- Cuyuna Country State Recreation Area
- Cuyuna Lakes State Trail (within Cuyuna Country SRA)
- Duck Lakes State Wildlife Management Area
- Emily State Forest
- Loerch State Wildlife Management Area
- Mille Lacs Moraine Scientific and Natural Area
- Safari North Wildlife Park
- Upper Dean State Wildlife Management Area

=== Superfund site and environmental damage ===
The presence of railroads increased development in the county but also brought environmental problems. The Burlington Northern (Brainerd/Baxter) EPA Superfund site is between Brainerd and Baxter. Burlington Northern Railroad had a treatment plant in Crow Wing County for railroad ties, to protect the wood from weather and insects. Wastewater generated from the wood-treating process was sent to two shallow, unlined ponds. This created sludge that contaminated both the underlying soils and the groundwater with creosote and polynuclear aromatic hydrocarbons (PAHs).

== Demographics ==
Historical population
Census	Pop.	Note	%±
1860	269		—
1870	200		−25.7%
1880	2,319		1,059.5%
1890	8,852		281.7%
1900	14,250		61.0%
1910	16,861		18.3%
1920	24,566		45.7%
1930	25,627		4.3%
1940	30,226		17.9%
1950	30,875		2.1%
1960	32,134		4.1%
1970	34,826		8.4%
1980	41,722		19.8%
1990	44,249		6.1%
2000	55,099		24.5%
2010	62,500		13.4%
2020	66,123		5.8%
2025 (est.)	69,132	▲	4.6%
U.S. Decennial Census; 1790–1960 1900–1990; 1990–2000 2010–2020

=== Racial and ethnic composition ===
Crow Wing County, Minnesota – Racial and ethnic composition Note: the US Census treats Hispanic/Latino as an ethnic category. This table excludes Latinos from the racial categories and assigns them to a separate category. Hispanics/Latinos may be of any race.
Race / Ethnicity (NH = Non-Hispanic)	Pop 1980	Pop 1990	Pop 2000	Pop 2010	Pop 2020	% 1980	% 1990	% 2000	% 2010	% 2020
White alone (NH)	41,208	43,546	53,580	59,979	61,252	98.77%	98.41%	97.24%	95.97%	92.63%
Black or African American alone (NH)	50	94	167	297	383	0.12%	0.21%	0.30%	0.48%	0.58%
Native American or Alaska Native alone (NH)	191	301	415	471	623	0.46%	0.68%	0.75%	0.75%	0.94%
Asian alone (NH)	142	131	151	232	332	0.34%	0.30%	0.27%	0.37%	0.50%
Native Hawaiian or Pacific Islander alone (NH)	x	x	7	15	19	x	x	0.01%	0.02%	0.03%
Other race alone (NH)	10	3	18	28	240	0.02%	0.01%	0.03%	0.04%	0.36%
Mixed race or Multiracial (NH)	x	x	380	826	2,362	x	x	0.69%	1.32%	3.57%
Hispanic or Latino (any race)	121	174	381	652	912	0.29%	0.39%	0.69%	1.04%	1.38%
Total	41,722	44,249	55,099	62,500	66,123	100.00%	100.00%	100.00%	100.00%	100.00%

=== 2020 census ===
As of the 2020 census, the county had a population of 66,123. The median age was 44.8 years. 21.4% of residents were under the age of 18 and 23.8% of residents were 65 years of age or older. For every 100 females there were 100.1 males, and for every 100 females age 18 and over there were 99.0 males age 18 and over.

The racial makeup of the county was 93.1% White, 0.6% Black or African American, 1.0% American Indian and Alaska Native, 0.5% Asian, <0.1% Native Hawaiian and Pacific Islander, 0.6% from some other race, and 4.1% from two or more races. Hispanic or Latino residents of any race comprised 1.4% of the population.

31.3% of residents lived in urban areas, while 68.7% lived in rural areas.

There were 27,872 households in the county, of which 25.2% had children under the age of 18 living in them. Of all households, 49.8% were married-couple households, 19.1% were households with a male householder and no spouse or partner present, and 22.8% were households with a female householder and no spouse or partner present. About 29.5% of all households were made up of individuals and 13.6% had someone living alone who was 65 years of age or older.

There were 41,568 housing units, of which 32.9% were vacant. Among occupied housing units, 76.0% were owner-occupied and 24.0% were renter-occupied. The homeowner vacancy rate was 1.3% and the rental vacancy rate was 6.8%.

=== 2000 census ===
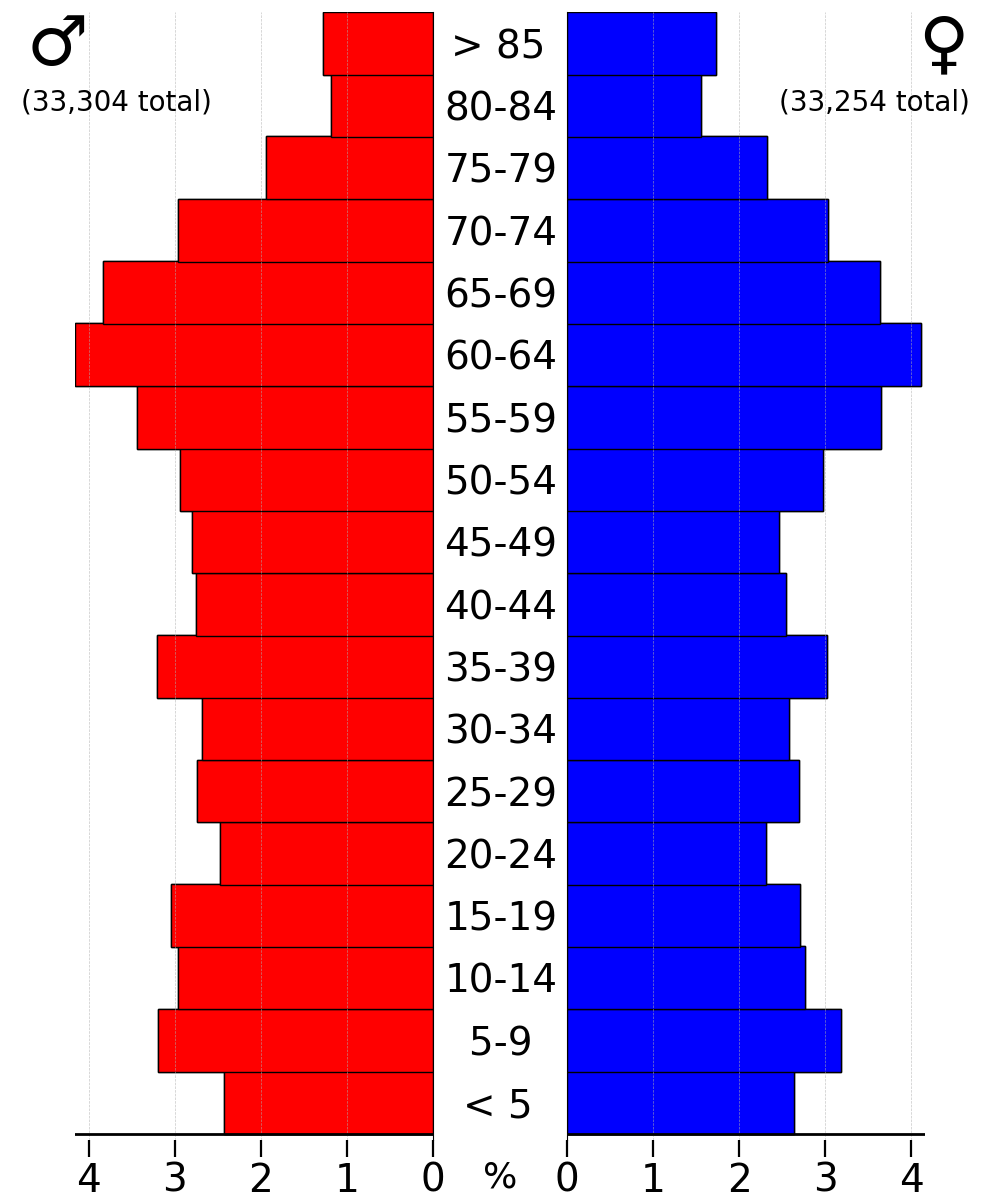
2022 US Census population pyramid for Crow Wing County, from ACS 5-year estimates

As of the census of 2000, there were 55,099 people, 22,250 households, and 15,174 families in the county. The population density was 55.2 per square mile (21.3/km^{2}). There were 33,483 housing units at an average density of 33.5 per square mile (12.9/km^{2}). The racial makeup of the county was 97.64% White, 0.31% Black or African American, 0.78% Native American, 0.28% Asian, 0.01% Pacific Islander, 0.20% from other races, and 0.78% from two or more races. 0.69% of the population were Hispanic or Latino of any race. 32.5% were of German, 16.4% Norwegian, 9.4% Swedish, 6.2% Irish and 5.2% American ancestry.

There were 22,250 households, out of which 30.20% had children under the age of 18 living with them, 56.70% were married couples living together, 8.00% had a female householder with no husband present, and 31.80% were non-families. 26.40% of all households were made up of individuals, and 11.70% had someone living alone who was 65 years of age or older. The average household size was 2.43 and the average family size was 2.93.

The county population contained 24.80% under the age of 18, 8.10% from 18 to 24, 25.60% from 25 to 44, 24.40% from 45 to 64, and 17.10% who were 65 years of age or older. The median age was 39 years. For every 100 females there were 96.80 males. For every 100 females age 18 and over, there were 94.50 males.

The median income for a household in the county was $37,589, and the median income for a family was $44,847. Males had a median income of $33,838 versus $22,896 for females. The per capita income for the county was $19,174. About 6.50% of families and 9.80% of the population were below the poverty line, including 11.40% of those under age 18 and 9.90% of those age 65 or over.

== Communities ==
=== Cities ===
- Baxter
- Brainerd (county seat)
- Breezy Point
- Crosby
- Crosslake
- Cuyuna
- Deerwood
- Emily
- Fifty Lakes
- Fort Ripley
- Garrison
- Ironton
- Jenkins
- Manhattan Beach
- Nisswa
- Pequot Lakes
- Riverton
- Trommald

=== Census-designated place ===
- Merrifield

=== Unincorporated communities ===
- Barrows
- Bay Lake
- Crosby Beach
- Crow Wing
- Ideal Corners
- Iron Hub
- Klondyke
- Lake Hubert
- Legionville
- Little Pine
- Loerch
- Mission
- Old Crow Wing (ghost town)
- Pine Center
- Saint Mathias
- Shephard
- Swanburg
- Wolford
- Woodrow

=== Townships ===
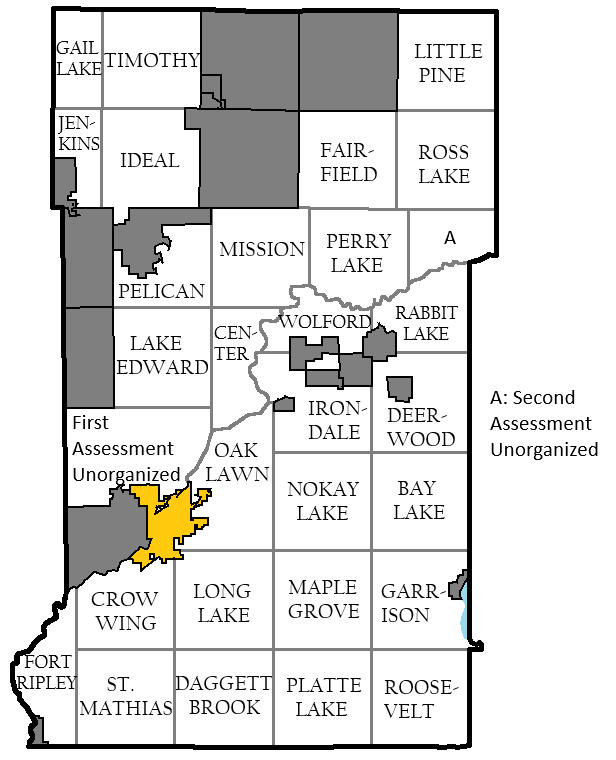
Townships and unorganized territories of Crow Wing County

- Bay Lake Township
- Center Township
- Crow Wing Township
- Daggett Brook Township
- Deerwood Township
- Fairfield Township
- Fort Ripley Township
- Gail Lake Township
- Garrison Township
- Ideal Township
- Irondale Township
- Jenkins Township
- Lake Edwards Township
- Little Pine Township
- Long Lake Township
- Maple Grove Township
- Mission Township
- Nokay Lake Township
- Oak Lawn Township
- Pelican Township
- Perry Lake Township
- Platte Lake Township
- Rabbit Lake Township
- Roosevelt Township
- Ross Lake Township
- Saint Mathias Township
- Sibley Township (former)
- Timothy Township
- Wolford Township

=== Unorganized territories ===
- Dean Lake
- West Crow Wing

== Government and politics ==
Crow Wing County has voted Republican in presidential elections for several decades. In only one presidential election since 1976 has the county selected the Democratic nominee. In the 34 presidential elections the county has participated in, it has voted Democratic 10 times. Democratic presidential nominees have not received 40% or more of the vote in Crow Wing County since 2012.

United States presidential election results for Crow Wing County, Minnesota
Year	Republican		Democratic		Third party(ies)	
Year	No.	%	No.	%	No.	%
1892	916	53.10%	519	30.09%	290	16.81%
1896	1,701	59.35%	1,066	37.19%	99	3.45%
1900	1,803	67.23%	804	29.98%	75	2.80%
1904	2,150	77.01%	333	11.93%	309	11.07%
1908	1,681	59.42%	661	23.37%	487	17.21%
1912	691	20.96%	709	21.50%	1,897	57.54%
1916	1,715	44.42%	1,568	40.61%	578	14.97%
1920	5,262	70.34%	1,077	14.40%	1,142	15.27%
1924	4,230	50.07%	417	4.94%	3,802	45.00%
1928	6,436	67.87%	2,851	30.06%	196	2.07%
1932	3,991	41.67%	5,068	52.91%	519	5.42%
1936	3,611	33.83%	6,561	61.47%	501	4.69%
1940	5,524	44.02%	6,876	54.79%	150	1.20%
1944	4,500	44.70%	5,504	54.67%	63	0.63%
1948	4,702	39.70%	6,773	57.18%	370	3.12%
1952	6,992	53.97%	5,883	45.41%	81	0.63%
1956	6,657	54.37%	5,556	45.38%	30	0.25%
1960	7,727	52.87%	6,835	46.77%	52	0.36%
1964	5,131	35.76%	9,197	64.10%	21	0.15%
1968	6,687	45.20%	7,411	50.09%	697	4.71%
1972	8,774	53.01%	7,328	44.28%	449	2.71%
1976	8,072	41.26%	10,653	54.45%	839	4.29%
1980	10,844	50.03%	9,323	43.01%	1,510	6.97%
1984	11,362	56.16%	8,719	43.10%	151	0.75%
1988	11,017	52.69%	9,674	46.26%	220	1.05%
1992	9,112	37.13%	8,896	36.25%	6,531	26.61%
1996	10,095	40.44%	11,156	44.69%	3,712	14.87%
2000	15,035	53.45%	11,255	40.01%	1,838	6.53%
2004	19,106	56.96%	14,005	41.75%	434	1.29%
2008	18,567	52.80%	15,859	45.10%	739	2.10%
2012	19,415	55.60%	14,760	42.27%	745	2.13%
2016	22,287	62.18%	10,982	30.64%	2,573	7.18%
2020	25,676	63.91%	13,726	34.17%	771	1.92%
2024	27,423	64.73%	14,173	33.45%	770	1.82%

County Board of Commissioners
Position	Name	District
Commissioner	Paul Koering	District 1
Commissioner and Vice Chair	John Lubke	District 2
Commissioner	Steve Barrows	District 3
Commissioner and Chair	Rosemary Franzen	District 4
Commissioner	Doug Houge	District 5

State Legislature (2025–2027)
Position	Name	Affiliation	District
Senate	Keri Heintzeman	Republican	District 6
House of Representatives	Ben Davis	Republican	District 6A
House of Representatives	Josh Heintzeman	Republican	District 6B

U.S Congress (2025–2027)
Position	Name	Affiliation	District
House of Representatives	Pete Stauber	Republican	8th
Senate	Amy Klobuchar	Democrat	N/A
Senate	Tina Smith	Democrat	N/A

== Education ==
School districts include:

- Aitkin Public School District
- Brainerd Public Schools
- Crosby-Ironton Public School District
- Little Falls Public School District
- Onamia Public Schools
- Pequot Lakes Public Schools
- Pierz Public School District
- Pine River-Backus Public School District

== See also ==
- National Register of Historic Places listings in Crow Wing County, Minnesota
- List of Superfund sites in Minnesota
