= Cass Lake, Minnesota =

City in Minnesota, United States

Cass Lake Gaa-miskwaawaakokaag (Ojibwe)
- City
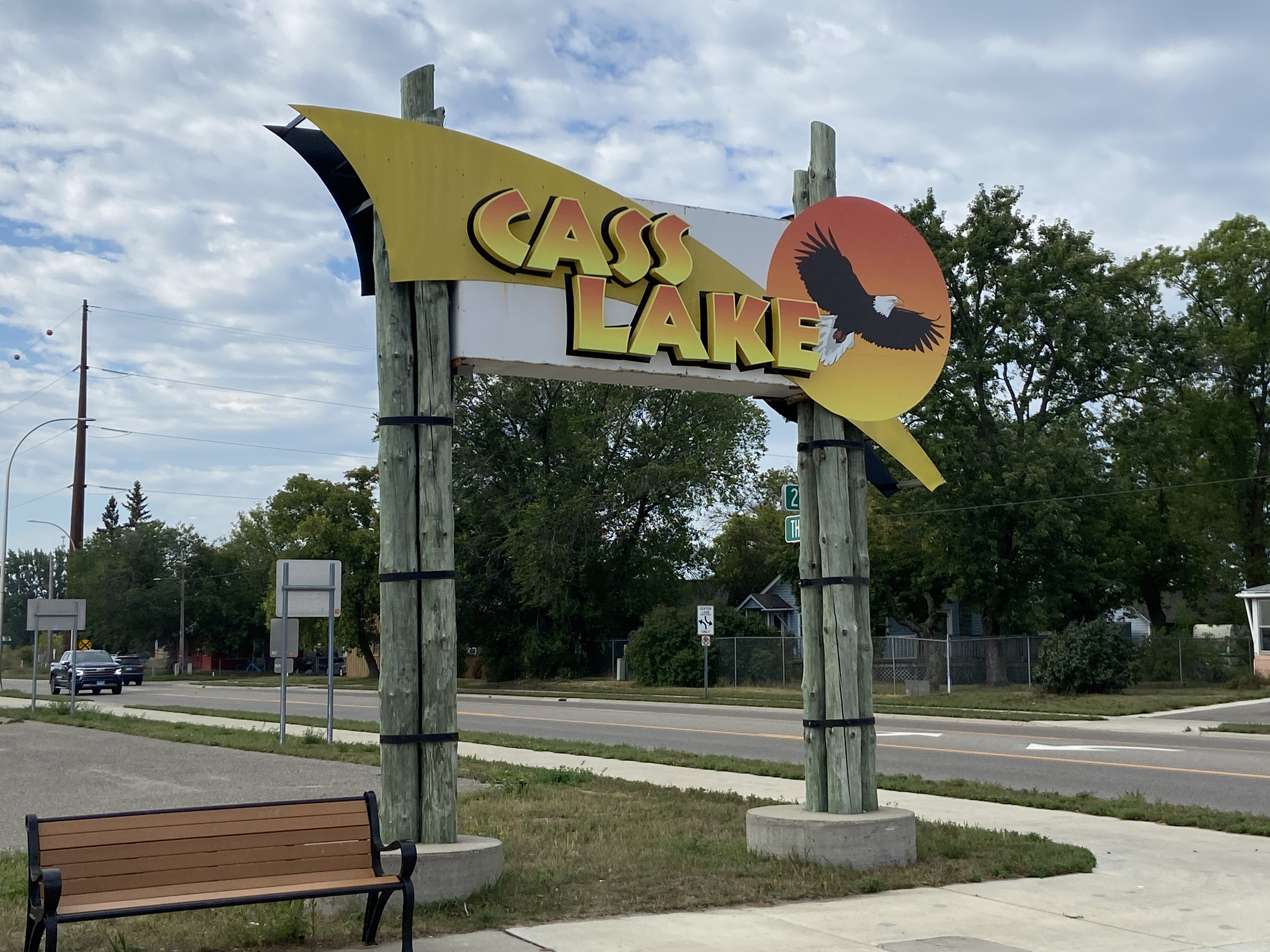

- Location of Cass Lake within Cass County, Minnesota
- Coordinates: 47°22′38″N 94°36′00″W
- Country: United States
- State: Minnesota
- County: Cass

Area
  - Total: 1.09 sq mi (2.83 km^{2})
  - Land: 1.09 sq mi (2.82 km^{2})
  - Water: 0 sq mi (0.00 km^{2})
- Elevation: 1,335 ft (407 m)

Population (2020)
  - Total: 675
  - Density: 619.0/sq mi (239.01/km^{2})
- Time zone: UTC−6 (Central (CST))
  - Summer (DST): UTC−5 (CDT)
- ZIP code: 56633
- Area code: 218
- FIPS code: 27-10252
- GNIS feature ID: 2393767
- Website: ci.casslake.mn.us

Cass Lake (Ojibwe: Gaa-miskwaawaakokaag) is a city in Cass County, Minnesota, United States, located within the boundaries of the Leech Lake Indian Reservation. It is surrounded by Pike Bay Township. Cass Lake had a population of 675 in the 2020 census. It is notable as the headquarters location of Minnesota Chippewa Tribe and Leech Lake Band of Ojibwe, as well as the Chippewa National Forest.

The city is located on the shore of its namesake Cass Lake, which was named in honor of Michigan Governor Lewis Cass.

Cass Lake is part of the Bemidji Micropolitan Statistical Area. It reached its peak of population of over 2,100 in 1920. Since 1950, the combination of decline of small town retailers, suburbanization, and decreased employment in forest industries have resulted in steadily decreasing population.

== Economy ==
Forest products have historically been an important part of the local economy. The Glenmont Lumber Company opened a sawmill in the autumn of 1898, followed by Scanlon-Gipson Lumber Company opening a planing mill in the summer of 1899. Both operated until the sawmill burnt in 1902. The Julius Neils Lumber Company opened a 30 mft sawmill, planing mill, and 8 mft lath mill in May 1900, operating until 1923. The Northern Pine Crating Co. opened a wooden box factory in the autumn of 1907, operating until the mill burned c.1950.

Wheeler Lumber Bridge and Supply Co. opened a post-peeling plant in 1949, followed by a wood-treating plant in 1951. This facility was expanded in 1959 and 1971. Wheeler was purchased by St. Regis Paper Company in 1968; St. Regis later purchased a sawmill as well Frank's Mill (opened 1939). After the purchase of St. Regis by Champion International in 1985, the corporation closed the facility. The sawmill was purchased by Cass Forest Products and continues to operate (as of 2010).

Tourism has been an increasingly important component of the local economy since the earliest days of the community. Numerous resorts and campgrounds in the area cater to sport fishing, hunting, camping, and watersports. Due to the cold winters, tourism is highly seasonal.

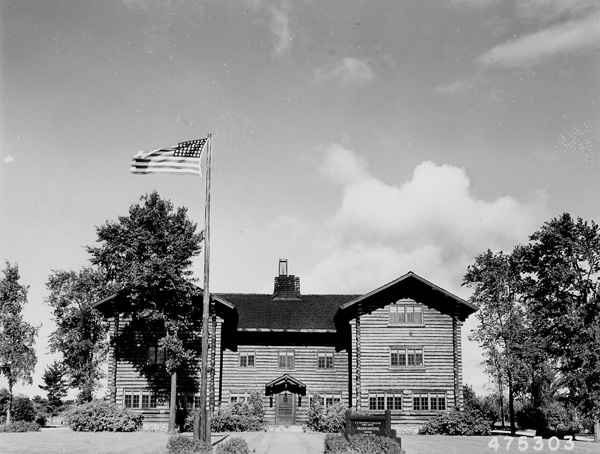
Forest Supervisor's Office, 1953

The Federal Government has been an important local employer since 1902, when the Minnesota Forest Reserve was established. Cass Lake was selected as the location of the Forest Supervisor's Office. Following passage of the Emergency Conservation Work Act of 1933 and establishment of the Civilian Conservation Corps, Cass Lake was the headquarters for the Chippewa Sub-District, responsible for management of over a dozen camps. Among the CCC projects completed in Cass Lake were the monumental log-construction Forest Supervisor's Office (1936) and establishment of the Lydick Nursery (1934), which produced millions of seedlings for reforestation work.

In 1922, the Bureau of Indian Affairs established the Consolidated Chippewa Agency to serve all the Ojibwe tribes in Minnesota, with the exception of Red Lake. It selected Cass Lake as its headquarters. Later, the Indian Health Service opened a hospital and clinic (1937) to serve the Leech Lake Indian Reservation.

Following passage of the Indian Reorganization Act of 1934 and establishment of the Minnesota Chippewa Tribe, tribal headquarters were located in Cass Lake. Cass Lake is also location of the headquarters of the Leech Lake Band of Ojibwe, which operates the Cedar Lakes Casino.

There are a variety of small businesses that keep the Cass Lake economy thriving.

== Education ==
Cass Lake is located in Independent School District 115 (Cass Lake-Bena School District). Cass Lake–Bena Elementary School is located within the city limits, while Cass Lake–Bena High School and Middle School are located approximately one mile south of town. Elementary school classes began in 1899 and the high school opened in 1904.

Students also attend the Bug-O-Nay-Ge-Shig School in an area near Bena, a Bureau of Indian Affairs-funded elementary and secondary school established in 1975.

Leech Lake Tribal College, a two-year tribal college, is located approximately 3 miles (4.8 km) northwest of town.

== History ==
The area was inhabited for thousands of years by succeeding cultures of indigenous peoples. In historic times, the Ojibwe/Chippewa moved west and south from the Great Lakes region, settling across present-day Minnesota.

The village was established in 1898 with the construction of the Great North Railway. The post office was originally established as 'Tuller' in December 1898, named after the brother-in-law of the first postmaster. When this was known, residents quickly lodged protests with the Postmaster General and by the end of March 1899, it was renamed 'Cass Lake'.

The forest industry has historically supplied many jobs, but has been susceptible to boom-and-bust cycle. Between 1898 and 1923, the city was dependent on lumber mills utilizing pine from the surrounding forests. Depletion of the pine resource was followed by utilization of lower value species at a box factory which operated until 1950, and a wood treatment plant operated by Wheeler Lumber between 1949 and 1985. From 1983 until 2009, Potlatch Corporation and its successor Ainsworth operated an oriented strand board plant in nearby Farden Township, which provided employment to many residents. Cass Forest Products, an employee-owned company, operates a sawmill that has been in operation since 1939, and is one of the largest forest product producers in Minnesota. The former wood-treating plant operated by Wheeler Lumber within the city limits has been designated a Federal Superfund site, due to soil and groundwater contamination by the wood treating compounds creosote, pentachlorophenol, and ammoniacal copper arsenate.

From 1911-1919, the Cass Lake Boarding School, a Native American residential school, operated in Cass Lake. The school opened with the capacity for 50 students.

In 2003, Elaine Fleming was the first Native American to be elected as mayor of the town.

== Geography and climate ==
According to the United States Census Bureau, the city has a total area of 1.09 square miles (2.8 km^{2}), all of it land.

Cass Lake has a humid continental climate (Köppen Climate Classification Dfb), with warm summers and long, cold winters.

Climate data for Cass Lake, Minnesota (1991–2020 normals, extremes 1911–present)
Month	Jan	Feb	Mar	Apr	May	Jun	Jul	Aug	Sep	Oct	Nov	Dec	Year
Record high °F (°C)	56 (13)	60 (16)	74 (23)	96 (36)	95 (35)	98 (37)	104 (40)	101 (38)	98 (37)	92 (33)	75 (24)	58 (14)	104 (40)
Mean daily maximum °F (°C)	17.8 (−7.9)	23.6 (−4.7)	37.0 (2.8)	51.0 (10.6)	65.0 (18.3)	74.5 (23.6)	79.1 (26.2)	77.3 (25.2)	68.0 (20.0)	52.3 (11.3)	35.9 (2.2)	22.9 (−5.1)	50.4 (10.2)
Daily mean °F (°C)	7.1 (−13.8)	11.6 (−11.3)	25.8 (−3.4)	40.0 (4.4)	53.6 (12.0)	63.9 (17.7)	68.5 (20.3)	66.6 (19.2)	57.4 (14.1)	43.0 (6.1)	27.7 (−2.4)	14.2 (−9.9)	39.9 (4.4)
Mean daily minimum °F (°C)	−3.6 (−19.8)	−0.4 (−18.0)	14.5 (−9.7)	28.9 (−1.7)	42.3 (5.7)	53.4 (11.9)	58.0 (14.4)	55.9 (13.3)	46.9 (8.3)	33.7 (0.9)	19.6 (−6.9)	5.6 (−14.7)	29.6 (−1.3)
Record low °F (°C)	−48 (−44)	−48 (−44)	−37 (−38)	−15 (−26)	10 (−12)	25 (−4)	33 (1)	26 (−3)	17 (−8)	2 (−17)	−31 (−35)	−46 (−43)	−48 (−44)
Average precipitation inches (mm)	0.76 (19)	0.74 (19)	1.24 (31)	1.98 (50)	2.93 (74)	4.07 (103)	3.74 (95)	3.06 (78)	2.91 (74)	2.76 (70)	1.29 (33)	1.01 (26)	26.49 (673)
Average snowfall inches (cm)	9.1 (23)	9.3 (24)	6.2 (16)	5.6 (14)	0.0 (0.0)	0.0 (0.0)	0.0 (0.0)	0.0 (0.0)	0.0 (0.0)	1.4 (3.6)	5.8 (15)	11.5 (29)	48.9 (124)
Average precipitation days (≥ 0.01 in)	7.9	6.8	7.3	8.5	11.7	12.7	10.8	9.3	10.4	10.3	7.1	8.5	111.3
Average snowy days (≥ 0.1 in)	7.7	6.2	5.0	2.6	0.1	0.0	0.0	0.0	0.0	1.1	4.8	7.9	35.4
Source: NOAA

== Demographics ==
Historical population
Census	Pop.	Note	%±
1900	546		—
1910	2,011		268.3%
1920	2,109		4.9%
1930	1,409		−33.2%
1940	1,904		35.1%
1950	1,936		1.7%
1960	1,586		−18.1%
1970	1,317		−17.0%
1980	1,001		−24.0%
1990	923		−7.8%
2000	860		−6.8%
2010	770		−10.5%
2020	675		−12.3%
U.S. Decennial Census

=== 2020 census ===
As of the census of 2020, the population was 675. The population density was 619.3 inhabitants per square mile (239.1/km^{2}). There were 296 housing units at an average density of 271.6 per square mile (104.9/km^{2}). The racial makeup of the city was 71.4% Native American, 19.0% White, 0.3% Black or African American, 0.1% Asian, 0.4% from other races, and 8.7% from two or more races. Ethnically, the population was 1.8% Hispanic or Latino of any race. The 2020 census results may be inaccurate, especially for rural and non-white communities, owing to the Census Bureau's implementation of differential privacy.

=== 2010 census ===
As of the census of 2010, there were 770 people, 305 households, and 164 families residing in the city. The population density was 675.4 inhabitants per square mile (260.8/km^{2}). There were 371 housing units at an average density of 325.4 per square mile (125.6/km^{2}). The racial makeup of the city was 67.9% Native American, 24.3% White, 0.3% African American, 0.8% Asian, 0.1% from other races, and 6.6% from two or more races. Hispanic or Latino of any race were 2.2% of the population.

There were 305 households, of which 34.8% had children under the age of 18 living with them, 17.0% were married couples living together, 25.9% had a female householder with no husband present, 10.8% had a male householder with no wife present, and 46.2% were non-families. 40.3% of all households were made up of individuals, and 18.4% had someone living alone who was 65 years of age or older. The average household size was 2.52 and the average family size was 3.29.

The median age in the city was 31.8 years. 30.9% of residents were under the age of 18; 10.1% were between the ages of 18 and 24; 23.3% were from 25 to 44; 21.9% were from 45 to 64; and 13.8% were 65 years of age or older. The gender makeup of the city was 48.6% male and 51.4% female.

=== 2000 census ===
As of the census of 2000, there were 860 people, 331 households, and 192 families residing in the city. The population density was 753.2 inhabitants per square mile (290.8/km^{2}). There were 384 housing units at an average density of 336.3 per square mile (129.8/km^{2}). The racial makeup of the city was 30.12% White, 64.42% Native American, 0.23% from other races, and 5.23% from two or more races. Hispanic or Latino of any race were 1.74% of the population.

There were 331 households, out of which 32.0% had children under the age of 18 living with them, 24.2% were married couples living together, 27.2% had a female householder with no husband present, and 41.7% were non-families. 38.1% of all households were made up of individuals, and 19.9% had someone living alone who was 65 years of age or older. The average household size was 2.59 and the average family size was 3.40.

In the city, the population was spread out, with 36.2% under the age of 18, 9.9% from 18 to 24, 23.1% from 25 to 44, 16.5% from 45 to 64, and 14.3% who were 65 years of age or older. The median age was 28 years. For every 100 females, there were 85.7 males. For every 100 females age 18 and over, there were 76.5 males.

The median income for a household in the city was $20,583, and the median income for a family was $23,977. Males had a median income of $22,614 versus $20,066 for females. The per capita income for the city was $9,569. About 25.4% of families and 29.0% of the population were below the poverty line, including 32.0% of those under age 18 and 29.4% of those age 65 or over.

== Infrastructure ==
=== Major highways ===
The following routes are located within Cass Lake.

- U.S. Highway 2
- Minnesota State Highway 371

== Notable people ==
- Alonzo Barnard (1817–1905), missionary
- Jamie Becker-Finn (born 1982), Minnesota State Representative District 42B (DFL)
- Elaine Fleming, Mayor, Cass Lake, MN (2003).
- Skip Finn (1948–2018), attorney, Minnesota State Senator District 4 (DFL).
- Roland H. Hartley (1864–1952), Governor of Washington, 1925-1933
- Donald D. Lundrigan (1910–1990), Minnesota State Representative and lawyer
- Charlie Munger (1924–2023), Vice-Chairman of Berkshire Hathaway Corporation
- Henry J. Neils (1896–1988), President of Flour City Ornamental Iron Works Company
- Alfred O. C. Nier (1911–1994), physicist (summer resident)
- Ozaawindib, Ojibwe chief and guide
- Joe Polo (born 1982), Olympic gold medalist in curling (2018)
- Dick Siebert (1912–1978), professional baseball player
- John Smith (1785?–1922), centenarian
- Erma Vizenor (born 1944), White Earth tribal chair

== Gallery ==
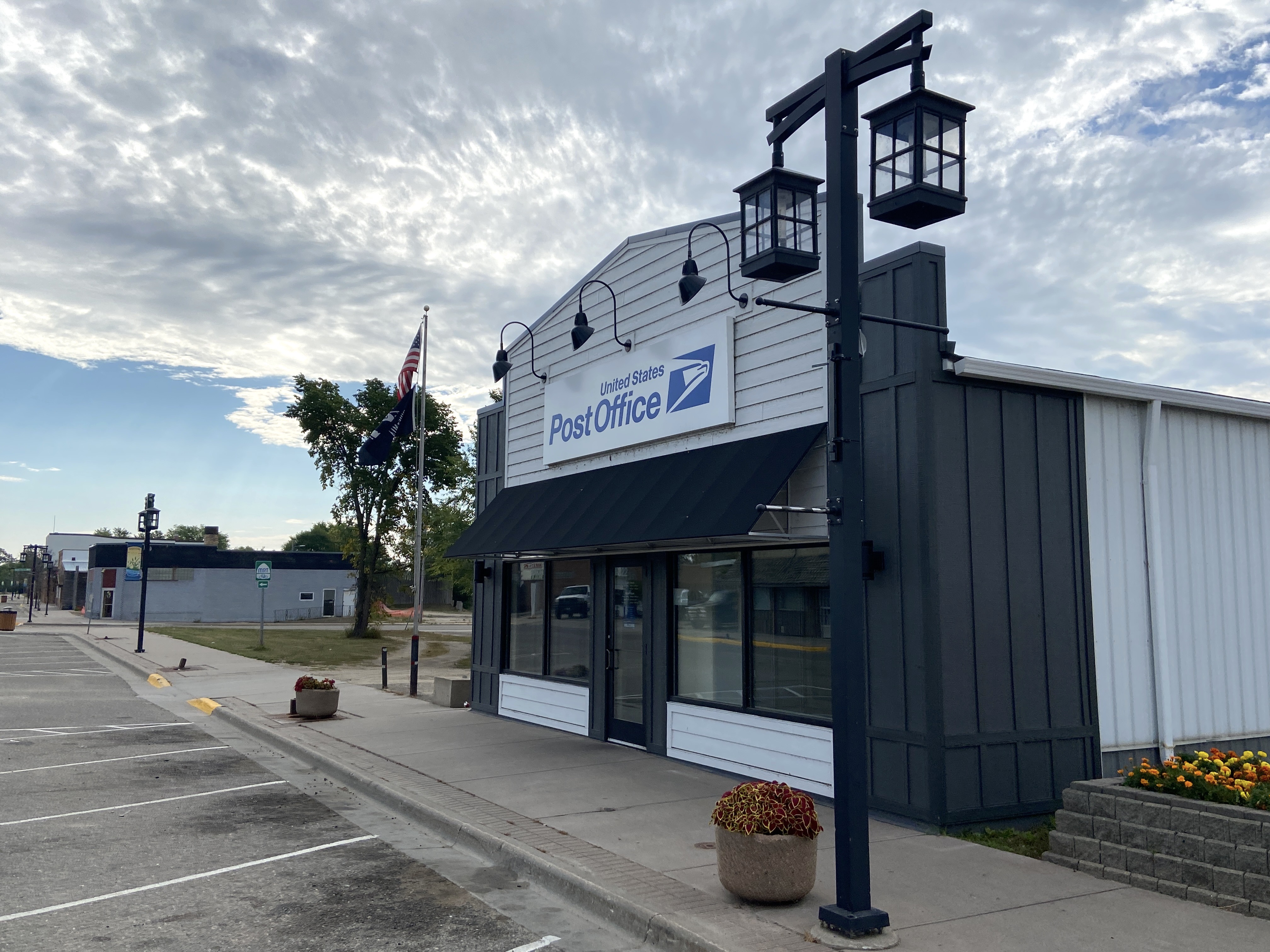
Post Office

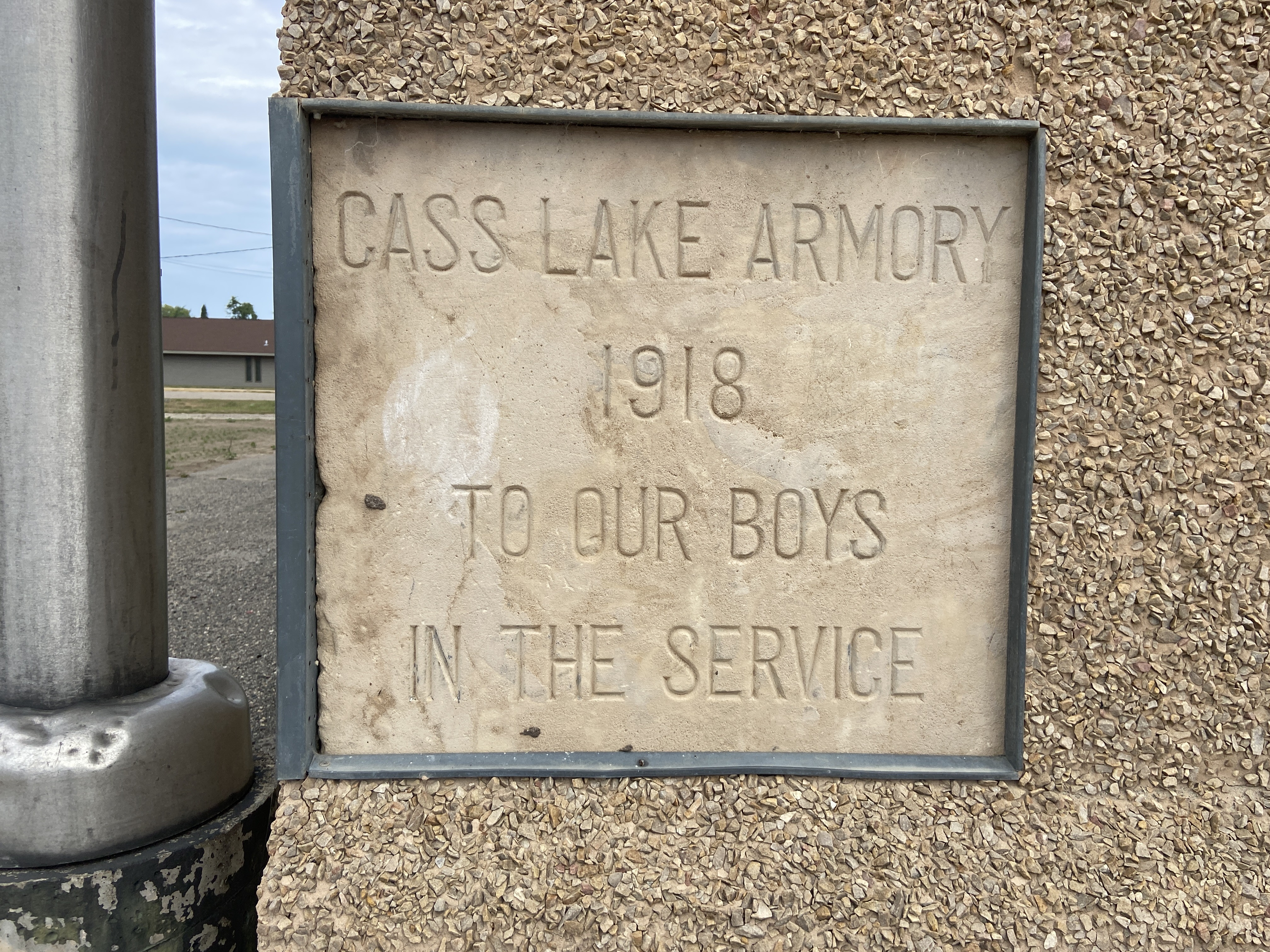
Armory cornerstone

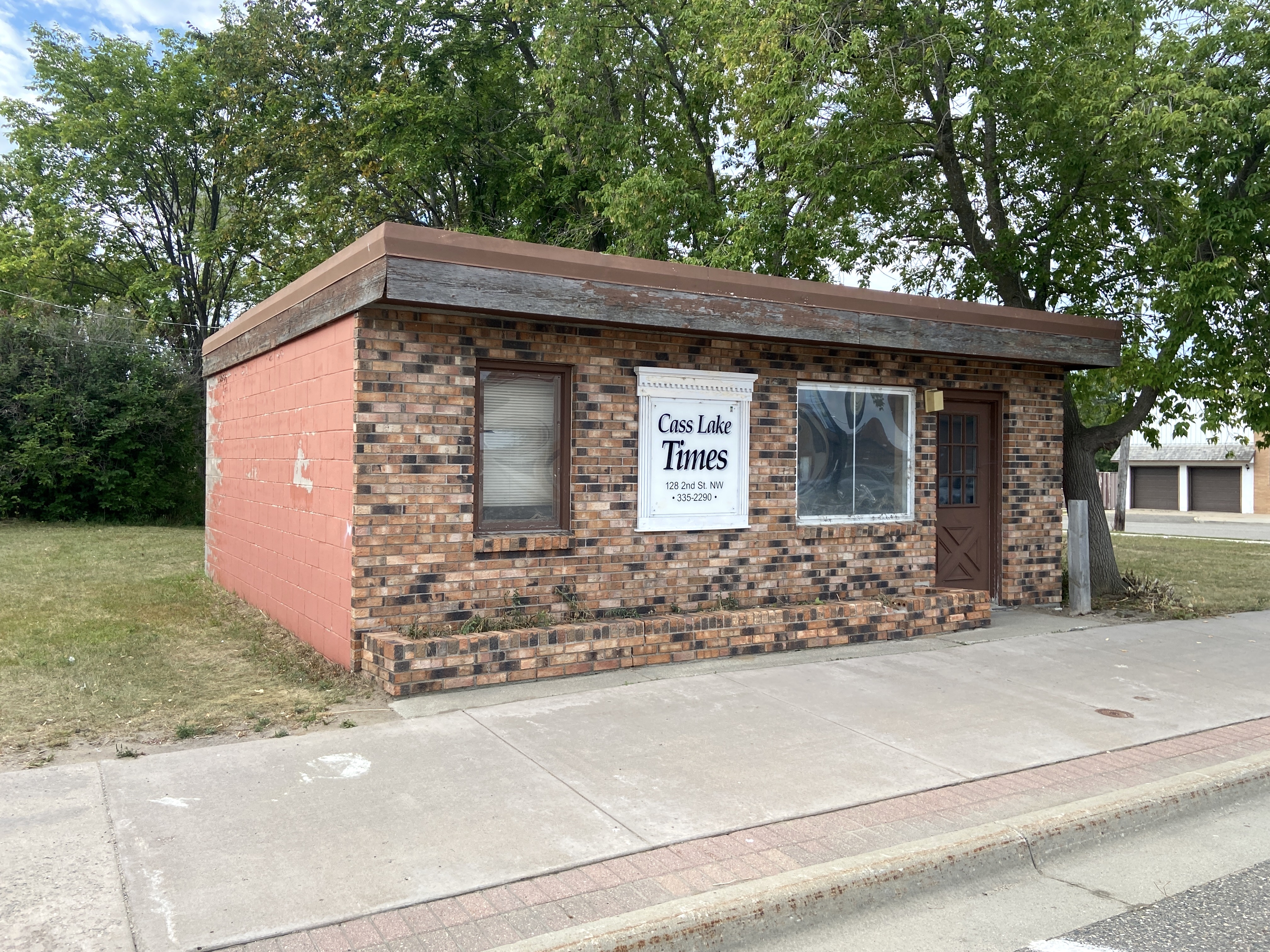
Cass Lake Times Newspaper

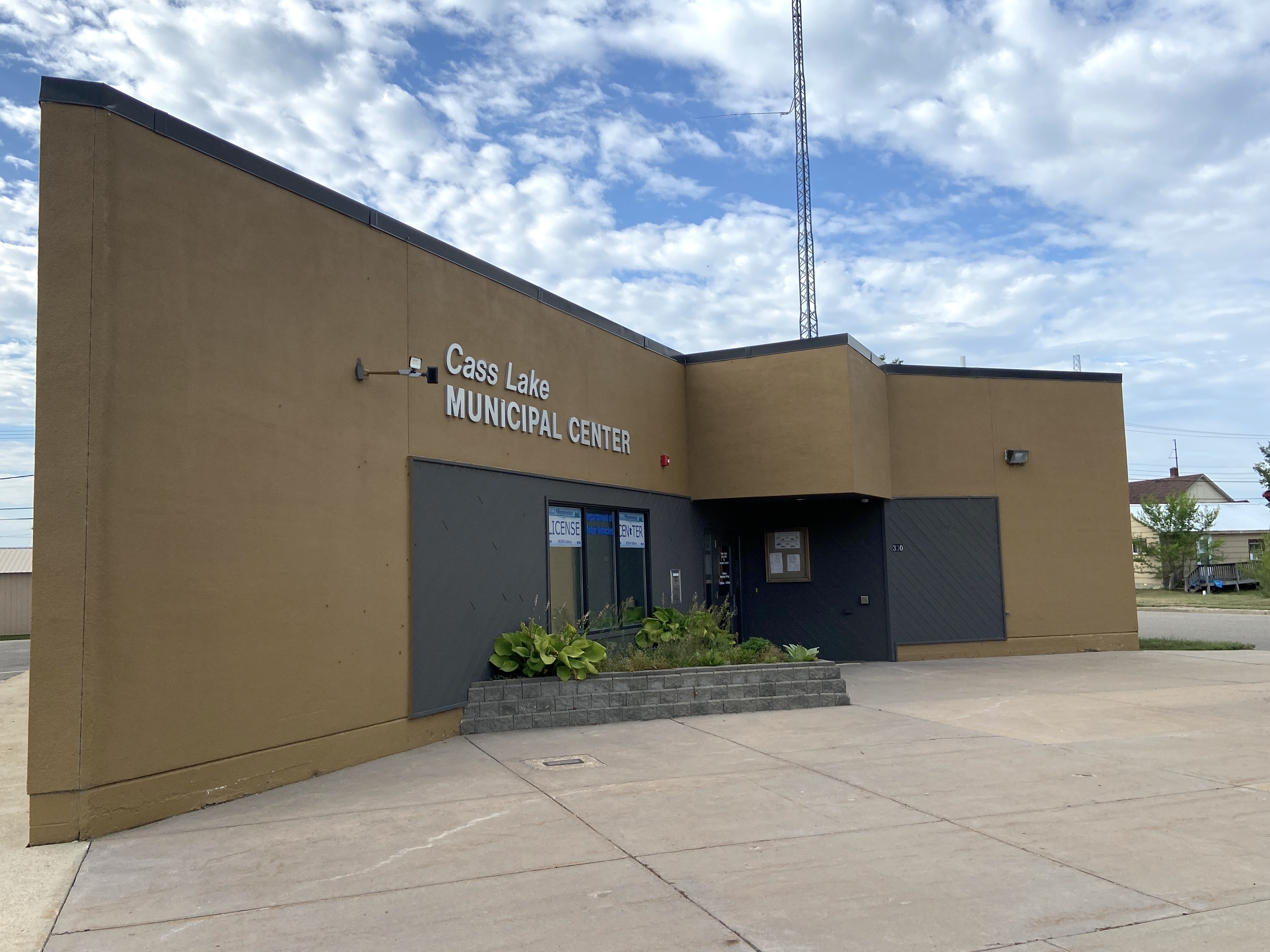
Municipal Center

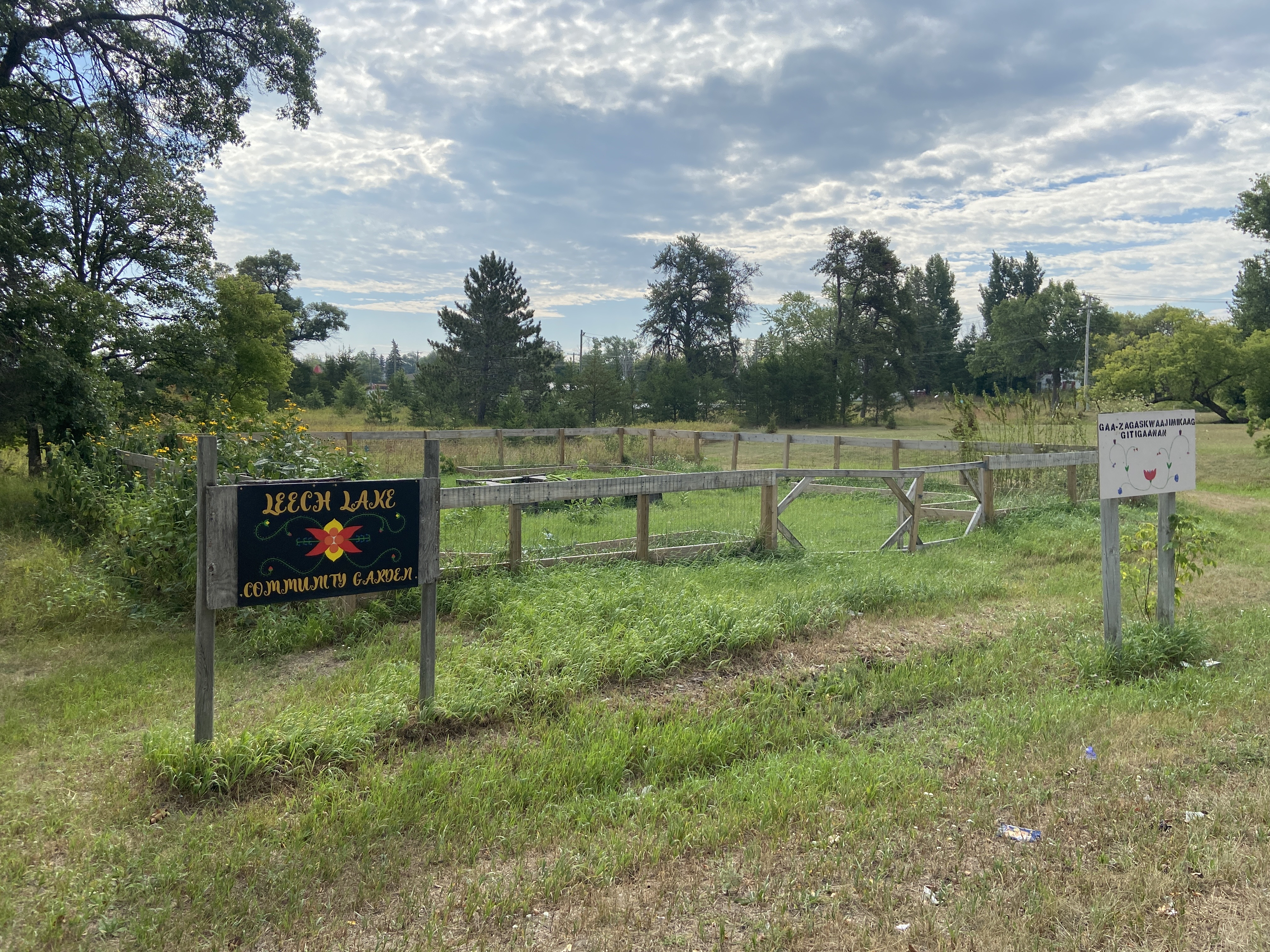
Community Garden
