= Northern Intercollegiate Athletic Conference =

College athletic conference

- Sport: basketball
- Founded: 1983
- Commissioner: Dan Hovestol
- No. of teams: 9
- Region: Upper Midwest
- Most recent champion: Providence University College (W) Canadian Mennonite University (M) (2026)
- Website: NIAC website

The Northern Intercollegiate Athletic Conference is an independent college athletic conference. The NIAC is made up of ten schools in Minnesota, North Dakota, South Dakota and Manitoba. The NIAC sponsors men's and women's basketball for member institutions.

The conference features five Christian colleges (Canadian Mennonite, Free Lutheran Bible, Oak Hills Christian, Providence and Trinity Bible) as well as four Native American schools: Leech Lake Tribal (Leech Lake Band of Ojibwe), Nueta Hidatsa Sahnish College (Three Affiliated Tribes), Sisseton Wahpeton College (Sisseton Wahpeton Oyate) and Turtle Mountain (Turtle Mountain Band of Chippewa).

== History ==
Leech Lake Tribal and Red Lake Nation joined the NIAC in 2013.

Canadian Mennonite and Cankdeska Cikana were added to the league for the 2016–17 season.

Expansion for 2017-18 included Providence University College, Red River College and Sisseton Wahpeton College bringing the member total to ten.

Nueta Hidatsa Sahnish College was admitted to the NIAC for the 2019–20 season.

== Member schools ==
Institution	Location	Founded	Nickname
Cankdeska Cikana Community College	Fort Totten, North Dakota	1999	Wolves
Free Lutheran Bible College	Plymouth, Minnesota	1966	Conquerors
Leech Lake Tribal College	Cass Lake, Minnesota	1990	Lakers
Nueta Hidatsa Sahnish College	New Town, North Dakota	1973	Storm
Oak Hills Christian College	Bemidji, Minnesota	1927	Wolfpack
Red Lake Nation College	Red Lake, Minnesota	1987	Migizi
Sisseton Wahpeton College	Sisseton, South Dakota	1979	Mustangs
Trinity Bible College	Ellendale, North Dakota	1948	Lions
Turtle Mountain College	Belcourt, North Dakota	1972	Mighty Mikinocks

=== Former members ===
- Canadian Mennonite University
- Crossroads College
- Pillsbury Baptist Bible College
- Providence University College
- Red River College
- St. Cloud Technical & Community College
- Universite’ de Saint-Boniface

== Champions ==
Year	Men's champion	Score	Men's Runner up	Host city	Women's champion	Score	Women's Runner up
2006					Providence		
2007					Providence		
2008					St. Cloud Technical		
2009	St. Cloud Technical				St. Cloud Technical		
2010	St. Cloud Technical				Trinity Bible		
2011	Crossroads				Trinity Bible		
2012	Trinity Bible				Trinity Bible		
2013	Turtle Mountain				Trinity Bible		
2014	Trinity Bible	95-81	Turtle Mountain	Bemidji, MN	Trinity Bible	75-57	Turtle Mountain
2015	Trinity Bible	87-78	AFLBS	Ellendale, ND	Turtle Mountain	74-33	Leech Lake Tribal
2016	Turtle Mountain	80-70	Trinity Bible	Belcourt, ND	Trinity Bible	65-57	Turtle Mountain
2017	Trinity Bible	98-72	AFLBS	Bemidji, MN	Turtle Mountain	74-67	Trinity Bible
2018	Leech Lake Tribal	95-81	Providence	Fort Toten, ND	Sisseton Wahpeton	88-86	Canadian Mennonite
2019	Sisseton Wahpeton	103-85	Leech Lake Tribal	Sisseton, SD	Providence	73-60	Trinity Bible
2020	Red River	91-82	Sisseton Wahpeton	Bemidji/Cass Lake	Canadian Mennonite	72-71	Providence
2021	None due to COVID				None due to COVID		
2022	Turtle Mountain	95-80	Trinity Bible	Plymouth, MN	Sisseton Wahpeton	73-61	Trinity Bible
2023	Trinity Bible	86-83	Turtle Mountain	Plymouth, MN	Trinity Bible	70-42	Canadian Mennonite
2024	Trinity Bible	98-68	Providence	Plymouth, MN	Providence	59-54	Canadian Mennonite
2025	Providence	73-72	Canadian Mennonite	Plymouth, MN	Canadian Mennonite	71-58	Providence
2026	Canadian Mennonite	77-57	Trinity Bible	Plymouth, MN	Providence	80-72	Trinity Bible
