= Jamie Becker-Finn =

American politician (born 1982)

Member of the Minnesota House of Representatives from the 40B district
- In office January 3, 2017 – January 14, 2025
- Preceded by: Jason Isaacson
- Succeeded by: David Gottfried

Personal details
- Born: October 20, 1982 (age 43)
- Party: Democratic (DFL)
- Spouse: Gabe
- Children: 2
- Parent: Skip Finn (father)
- Education: University of Minnesota (B.A.); William Mitchell College of Law (J.D.)
- Occupation: Attorney; Small business owner; Legislator
- Website: Government website Campaign website

Jamie Becker-Finn (born October 20, 1982) is an American politician who served in the Minnesota House of Representatives from 2017 until 2025. A member of the Minnesota Democratic–Farmer–Labor Party (DFL), Becker-Finn represented District 42B in the northeastern Twin Cities metropolitan area, which includes the cities of Roseville and Shoreview and parts of Ramsey County, Minnesota.

== Early life, education, and career ==
Becker-Finn was raised in Cass Lake, Minnesota, on the Leech Lake Indian Reservation, where she graduated from Cass Lake-Bena Public Schools. Her father, Harold "Skip" Finn, was a Minnesota state senator of Ojibwe and Norwegian descent, and her mother, Teri, is also of Norwegian descent.

Becker-Finn attended the University of Minnesota, graduating with a Bachelor of Arts in psychology. She later attended William Mitchell College of Law, graduating with a Juris Doctor.

Becker-Finn is an assistant attorney for Hennepin County, specializing in domestic violence. She was a legislative assistant for the Minnesota House Tax Committee from 2007 to 2008, a clerk for the Minnesota Fourth District Court in Hennepin County, and a member of the Roseville Parks and Recreation Commission.

In 2022 Becker-Finn opened Makwa Coffee, a craft coffeeshop in Roseville, Minnesota.

== Minnesota House of Representatives ==
Becker-Finn was elected to the Minnesota House of Representatives in 2016 and was reelected every two years until 2022. She first ran after two-term DFL incumbent Jason Isaacson announced he would seek election to the Minnesota State Senate.

In 2018, Becker-Finn was an early endorser of Ilhan Omar for Minnesota's 5th congressional district. She served on Attorney General Keith Ellison's transition team.

Becker-Finn chaired the Judiciary Finance and Civil Law Committee from 2021 to 2024, and served on the Public Safety Finance and Policy, Ways and Means, and Workforce Development Finance and Policy Committees. From 2019 to 2020, she served as an assistant majority leader for the DFL House Caucus and vice chair of the Environment and Natural Resources Policy Committee. Becker-Finn was a member of the House People of Color and Indigenous (POCI) Caucus, and the Reproductive Freedom Caucus. After the 2020 election, she unsuccessfully challenged Ryan Winkler for the role of Majority Leader of the House.

In December 2023, Becker-Finn announced she would not seek reelection to the Minnesota House, leaving the House after serving four terms.

=== Judiciary and public safety ===
After the police murder of George Floyd, Becker-Finn called on the Republican-controlled State Senate to "support meaningful legislation to address systemic racism and police brutality". After the police killing of Daunte Wright, she called for reforms on traffic stop procedure. She authored bipartisan legislation that would eliminate driver's license suspensions for minor offenses.

Becker-Finn authored legislation to increase funding for public defenders that passed unanimously in the Minnesota House. In the midst of a vote from public defenders to go on strike, she held hearings on the lack of investment in public defenders, criticizing the Board of Public Defense for not asking for more funding in the past.

Becker-Finn offered an unsuccessful amendment to a 2017 public safety omnibus bill that would have increased penalties for protesters who block freeways, arguing it is a limit on free speech. She called the city of Minneapolis's backlog of untested rape kits "unacceptable" and pledged to work to get them tested, and authored legislation that would expand the definition of "mandatory reporters" in cases of sexual harassment and assault. She has supported restoring the right to vote to felons on parole. Becker-Finn authored legislation mandating gun owners to keep firearms in a locked container when not in use.

Becker-Finn attending listening sessions at women's prisons to discuss issues related to pregnant women and mothers of young children. Minnesota became the first state in the nation to stop separating moms in prison from their babies.

==== Addressing workplace sexual harassment ====
In 2017 after multiple reported instances of sexual harassment at the Capitol, Becker-Finn joined then-representative Erin Maye-Quade and then-candidate Lindsey Port in calling for the House to create a task force to address workplace sexual harassment. Two legislators, Dan Schoen and Tony Cornish, resigned amid multiple complaints from lobbyists, staff and fellow lawmakers. Becker-Finn called for tougher sanctions against sexual harassment, as well as investigations by a neutral third party unconnected to the party in control of the legislature.

=== Environment and natural resources ===
Becker-Finn opposed the Enbridge Line 3 oil pipeline project, a tar sands line that would run through tribal land, saying it "is never going to be my public policy perspective". In 2017, she opposed Republican efforts to remove regulatory requirements for the project, speaking against the provision on the House floor. She later authored a bill to give the Department of Natural Resources more tools to penalize water permit violations.

She has sponsored legislation to increase outdoor education opportunities for Minnesota children and disadvantaged communities, including passing the bipartisan "No Child Left Inside" program. She has supported calls to address water contamination by microplastics, lead and salt. She co-sponsored a bill that would have imposed a four-year moratorium on new large dairy farms, and a bill to evaluate native "rough" fish populations. In 2019, Becker-Finn authored legislation that banned nonessential use of firefighting foam that contains PFAS chemicals due to their health and environmental risks.

==== Chronic wasting disease ====
An avid hunter, Becker-Finn led efforts to address chronic wasting disease in the deer population. She has been a longtime supporter of tougher restriction on Minnesota's deer farms, and has criticized the Board of Animal Health's oversight of the industry. She passed a bill requiring owners to euthanize their herd when CWD is found, double-gate their properties, and undergo mandatory inspections to prevent further spread. Her proposals have been largely supported by deer hunters but opposed by lobbyists from the deer farm association. Becker-Finn has also authored other measures, like a state-funded buyout of deer farms, increased fencing, and a deer farm moratorium, that have not passed due to opposition in the Republican Senate. She has supported funding research efforts to better understand the disease and develop tests for use in deceased and live deer.

=== Native American issues ===
In 2019, Becker-Finn sponsored a measure to rename Lake Calhoun in Minneapolis, named after John C. Calhoun, to its Dakota name, Bde Maka Ska. The provision passed the House but not the Senate, and the lake was renamed by the Department of Natural Resources after a court appeals process. Becker-Finn has carried many tribe-specific bills, including legislation that requires that when the state sells property within a reservation it must first offer to sell it to the tribe. She supported legislation that created a task force on missing and murdered Native women.

Becker-Finn has spoken out publicly against offensive Native American depictions such as those in Halloween costumes and professional sports teams mascots. She has also criticized the former Minnesota state seal, which depicted a Native American being driven away by a settler with a rifle nearby.

== Electoral history ==
2016 Minnesota State House - District 42B
Party	Candidate	Votes	%
Democratic (DFL)	Jamie Becker-Finn	12,845	56.90
Republican	Tracy Nelson	9,688	42.92
Write-in		40	0.18
Total votes		22,573	100.0
Democratic (DFL) hold			

2018 Minnesota State House - District 42B
Party	Candidate	Votes	%
Democratic (DFL)	Jamie Becker-Finn (incumbent)	13,042	60.35
Republican	Yele-Mis Yang	8,543	39.53
Write-in		25	0.12
Total votes		21,610	100.0
Democratic (DFL) hold			

2020 Minnesota State House - District 42B
Party	Candidate	Votes	%
Democratic (DFL)	Jamie Becker-Finn (incumbent)	15,951	61.97
Republican	Sue Finney	9,750	37.88
Write-in		38	0.15
Total votes		25,739	100.0
Democratic (DFL) hold			

2022 Minnesota State House - District 40B
Party	Candidate	Votes	%
Democratic (DFL)	Jamie Becker-Finn (incumbent)	13,997	67.72
Republican	Allen Shen	6,652	32.18
Write-in		20	0.10
Total votes		20,669	100.0
Democratic (DFL) hold			

== Personal life ==
Becker-Finn and her husband, Gabe, reside in Roseville, Minnesota. They have two children. Becker-Finn is a descendant of the Leech Lake Band of Ojibwe. She is a lifelong hunter and fisher. She is Lutheran.
