= Leech Lake Band of Ojibwe =

Ojibwe band in Minnesota

Gaa-zagaskwaajimekaag Ojibweg
- Tribal flag

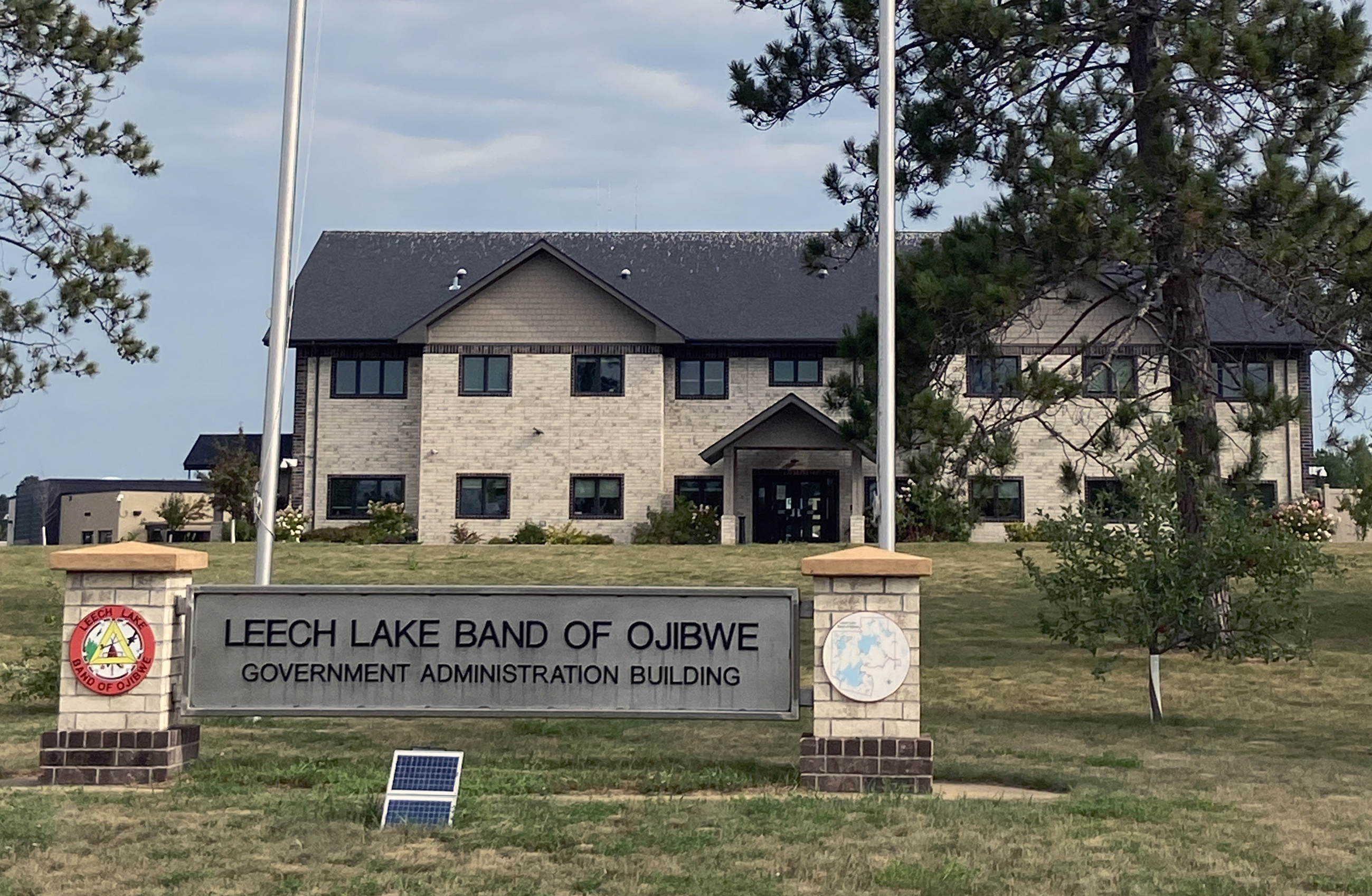
- Government Administration Building

Total population
- 9,426 (2014)

Regions with significant populations
- United States (Minnesota)

Languages
- English, Ojibwe

Religion
- Midewiwin, Roman Catholicism, Methodism

Related ethnic groups
- other bands of Minnesota Chippewa and other Ojibwe people

The Leech Lake Band of Ojibwe (Ojibwe: Gaa-zagaskwaajimekaag Ojibweg), also known as the Leech Lake Band of Chippewa Indians or the Leech Lake Band of Minnesota Chippewa Tribe is a federally recognized Ojibwe band located in Minnesota and one of six making up the Minnesota Chippewa Tribe. The band had 9,426 enrolled tribal members as of March 2014. The band's land base is the Leech Lake Indian Reservation, which includes eleven communities aggregated into three districts, as defined in the tribal constitution.

== Government ==
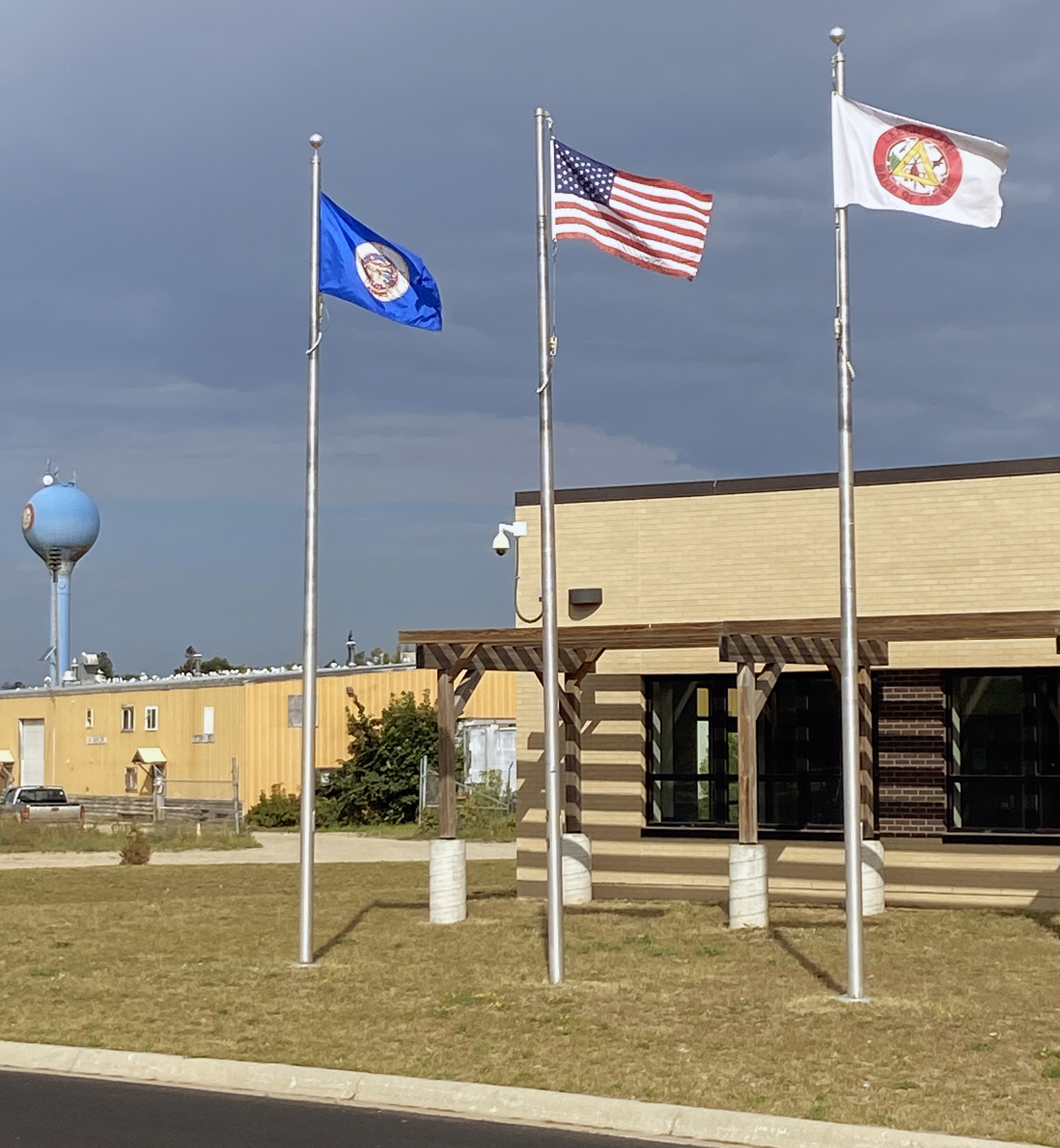
Flags at the Leech Lake Band of Ojibwe Tribal Office

As a member of the Minnesota Chippewa Tribe, which also includes the bands of Bois Forte, Fond du Lac, Grand Portage, Mille Lacs, and White Earth, the Leech Lake Band is governed by a tribal constitution, written following the 1934 Indian Reorganization Act. The tribe's constitution established a corporate system of governance with "reservation business committees," also referred to as "Reservation Tribal Councils", as the governmental body. The committees are composed of a chairperson, a secretary-treasurer, and three district representatives. The representatives are elected for four-year terms. Their elections are staggered.

The current Tribal Council is as follows (with the year of next election for the position in parentheses):

- Chairman Faron Jackson Sr. (2024)
- Secretary/Treasurer Leonard Fineday (2026)
- District I Representative Kyle Fairbanks (2026)
- District II Representative Steven White (2026)
- District III Representative LeRoy Staples-Fairbanks III (2024)

== Socioeconomic initiatives ==
The Leech Lake Band of Ojibwe operates three casinos: Cedar Lakes Casino and Hotel in Cass Lake on the Leech Lake Reservation; Northern Lights in Walker; and White Oak in Deer River. The Band's Business Development Division also operates the Che-We-Ka-E-Gon Complex in Cass Lake, which consists of a convenience store and gas station, a gift shop, and an office supply store. Additionally, the Band operates the Northern Lights Express, a gas station near the Northern Lights Casino. The Palace Casino and Hotel was replaced by the new Cedar Lakes Casino Hotel, which opened on August 8, 2019 in Cass Lake.

In addition to economic initiatives, the Leech Lake Band of Ojibwe has founded two major educational initiatives: the Bug-O-Nay-Ge-Shig School, an open enrollment K-12 school, and Leech Lake Tribal College, which grants associate degrees.

Like the Red Lake and White Earth Bands, the Leech Lake Band is known for its tradition of singing hymns in the Ojibwe language.

== Education ==
The tribal schools are Bug-O-Nay-Ge-Shig School and Leech Lake Tribal College.

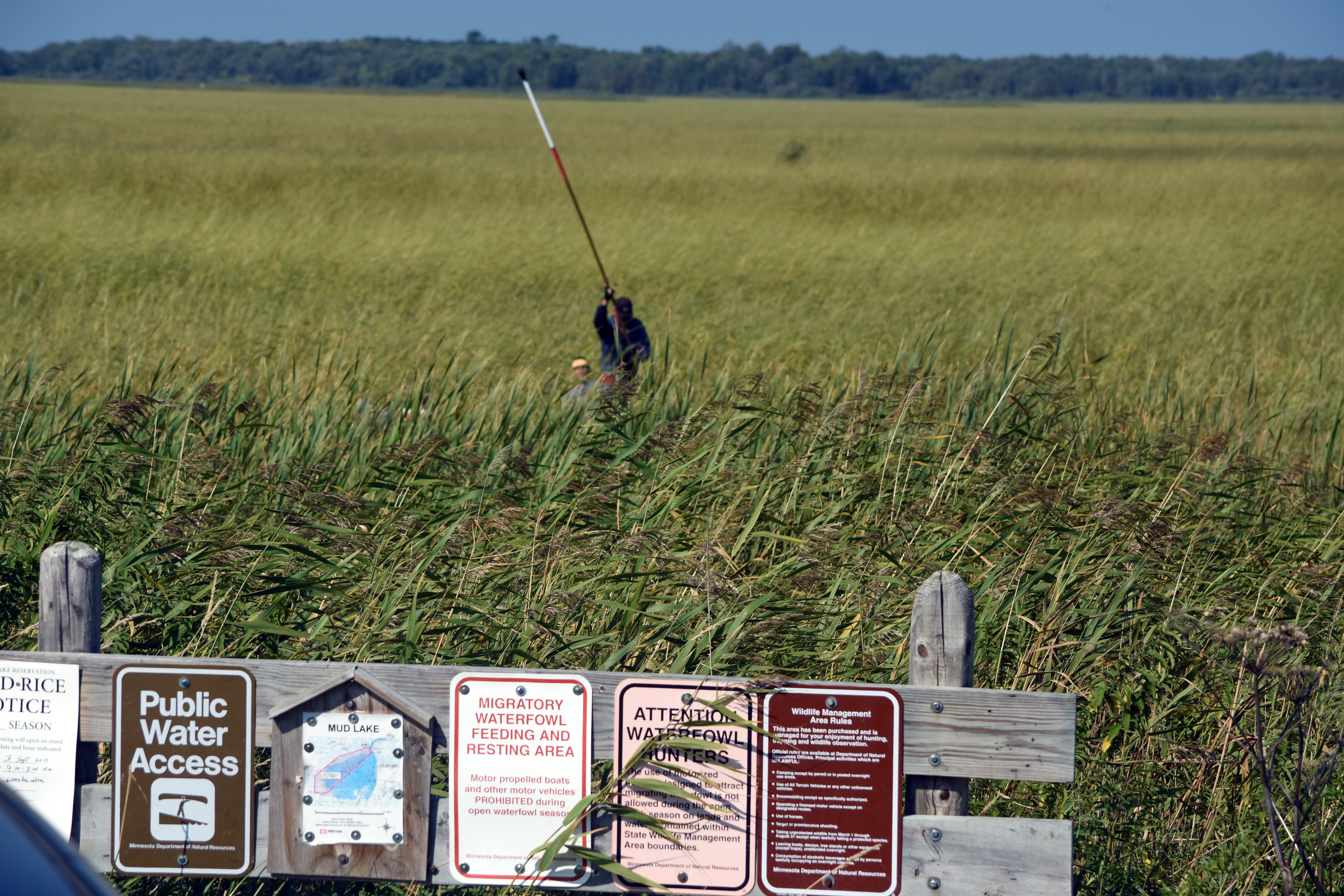
Wild rice harvest on Mud Lake

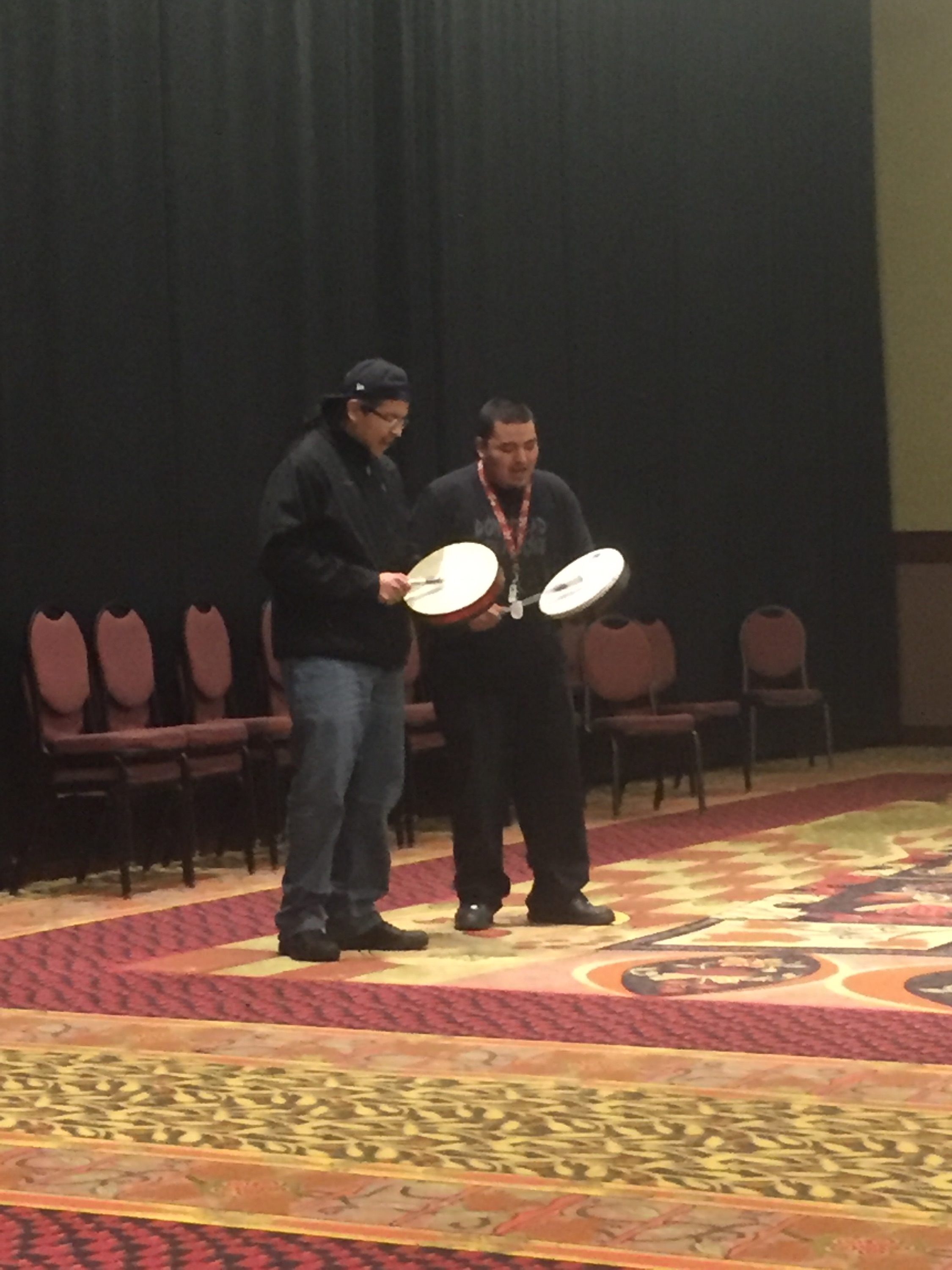
Tribal members perform drum ceremony

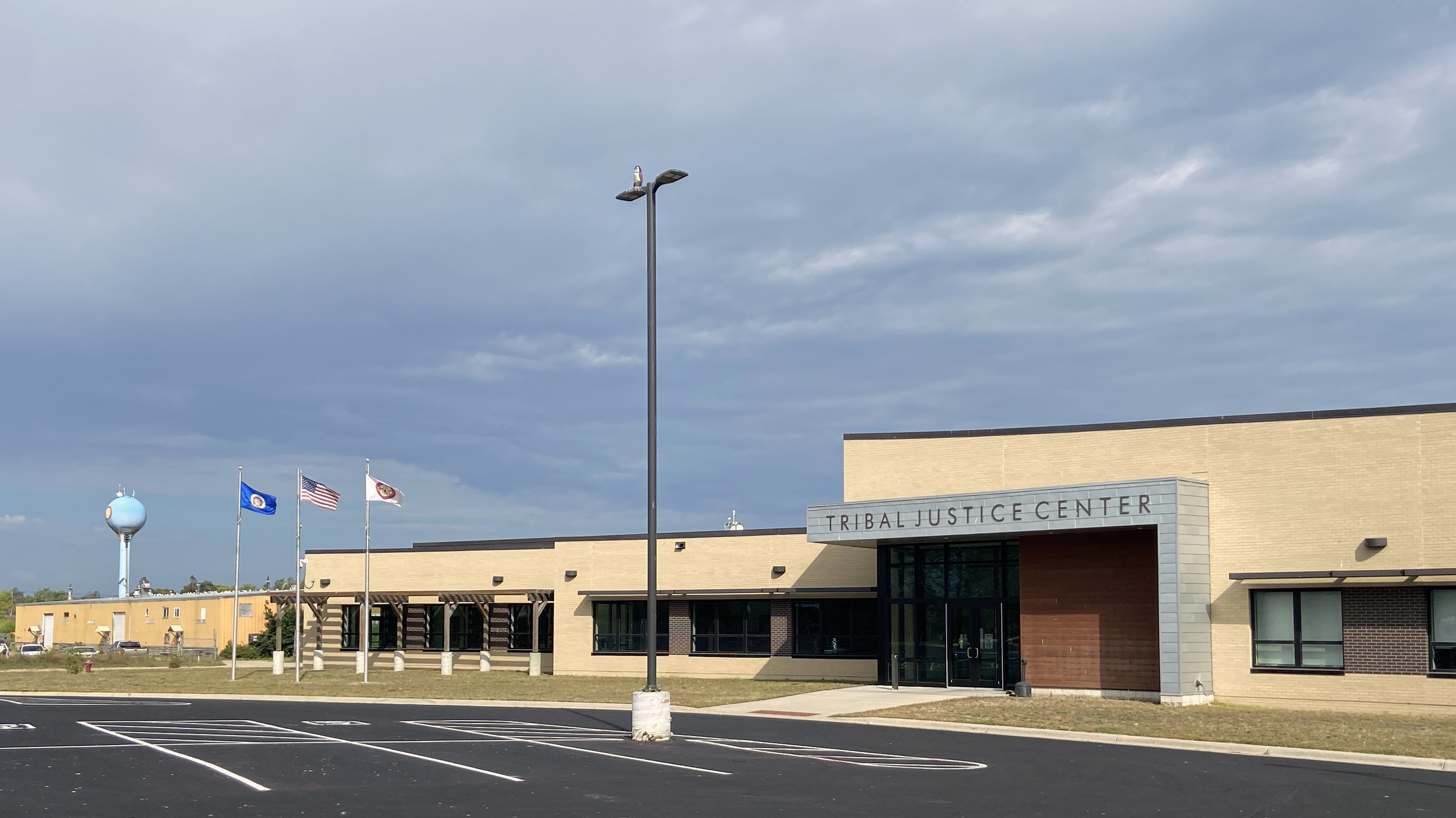
Tribal Justice Center

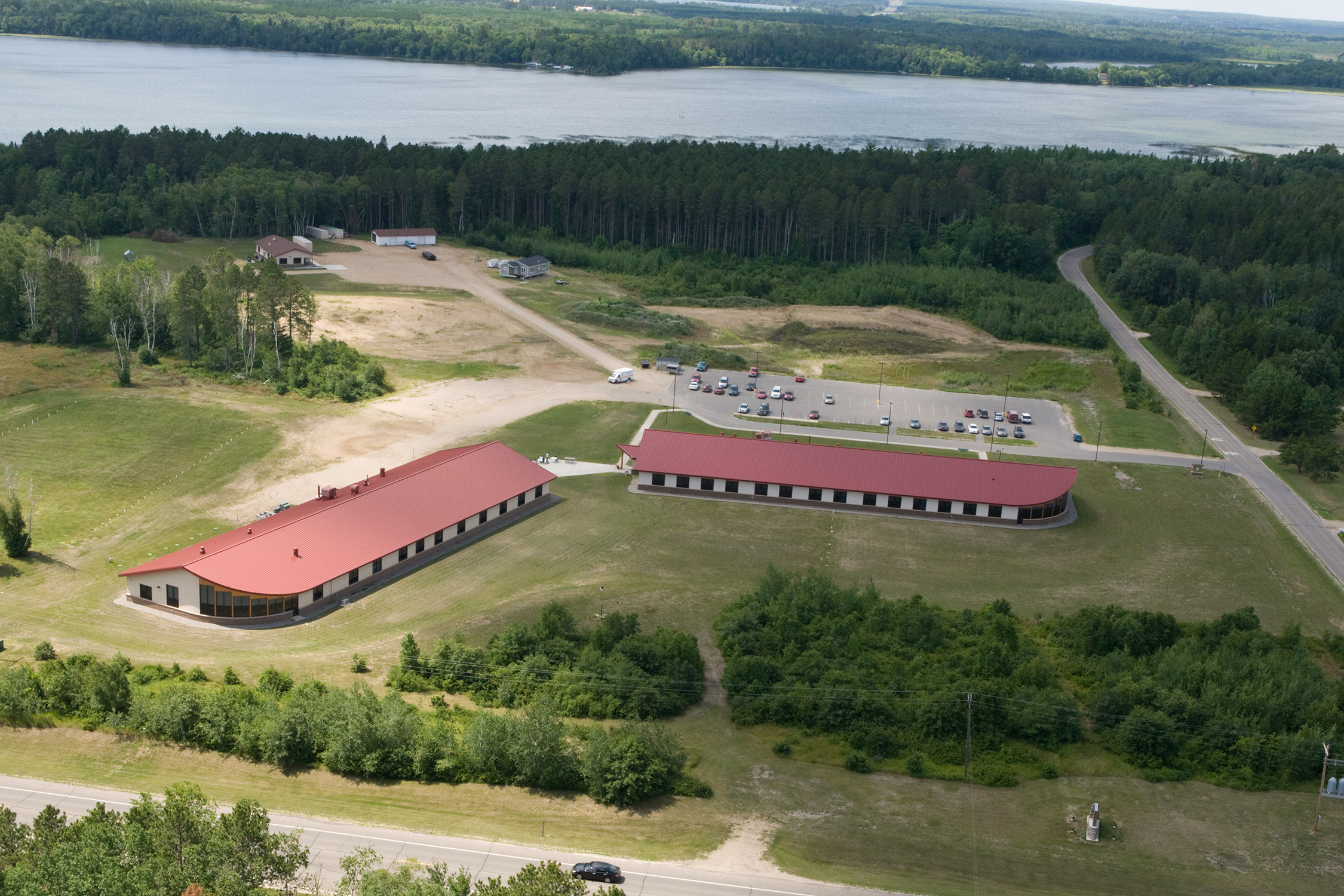
Leech Lake Tribal College

== Notable citizens ==
- Noah Rodriguez-White, Homecoming King in 2026
- Dennis Banks, American Indian Movement co-founder, writer, and Indigenous issues advocate
- Hedi Bogda-Hitchcock, Appellate Justice and Attorney
- Skip Finn (1948–2018), state senator and Ojibwe attorney
- Elaine Fleming, First Anishinaabe mayor of Cass Lake, Minnesota, and Chair of Arts and Humanities at Leech Lake Tribal College
- Ozaawindib, Ayaakwe, served as a guide to Henry Rowe Schoolcraft
- Wayne Reyes, Ojibwe member and Bena resident who was killed by Minneapolis Police officer Derek Chauvin in October 2006
- John Smith, chief, reportedly lived 137 years
- Anton Treuer, Bemidji State University assistant professor of Ojibwe language and author of Ojibwe histories
- David Treuer, author
- Delina White, artist, activist, clothing designer
- Irene Folstrom, activist, former girlfriend of Tiger Woods
- Delmar Jones III, activist, small business owner
