= North Cass, Minnesota =

Unorganized territory of Cass County, Minnesota, United States

Coordinates: 47°20′43″N 94°12′53″W

- Unorganized territory
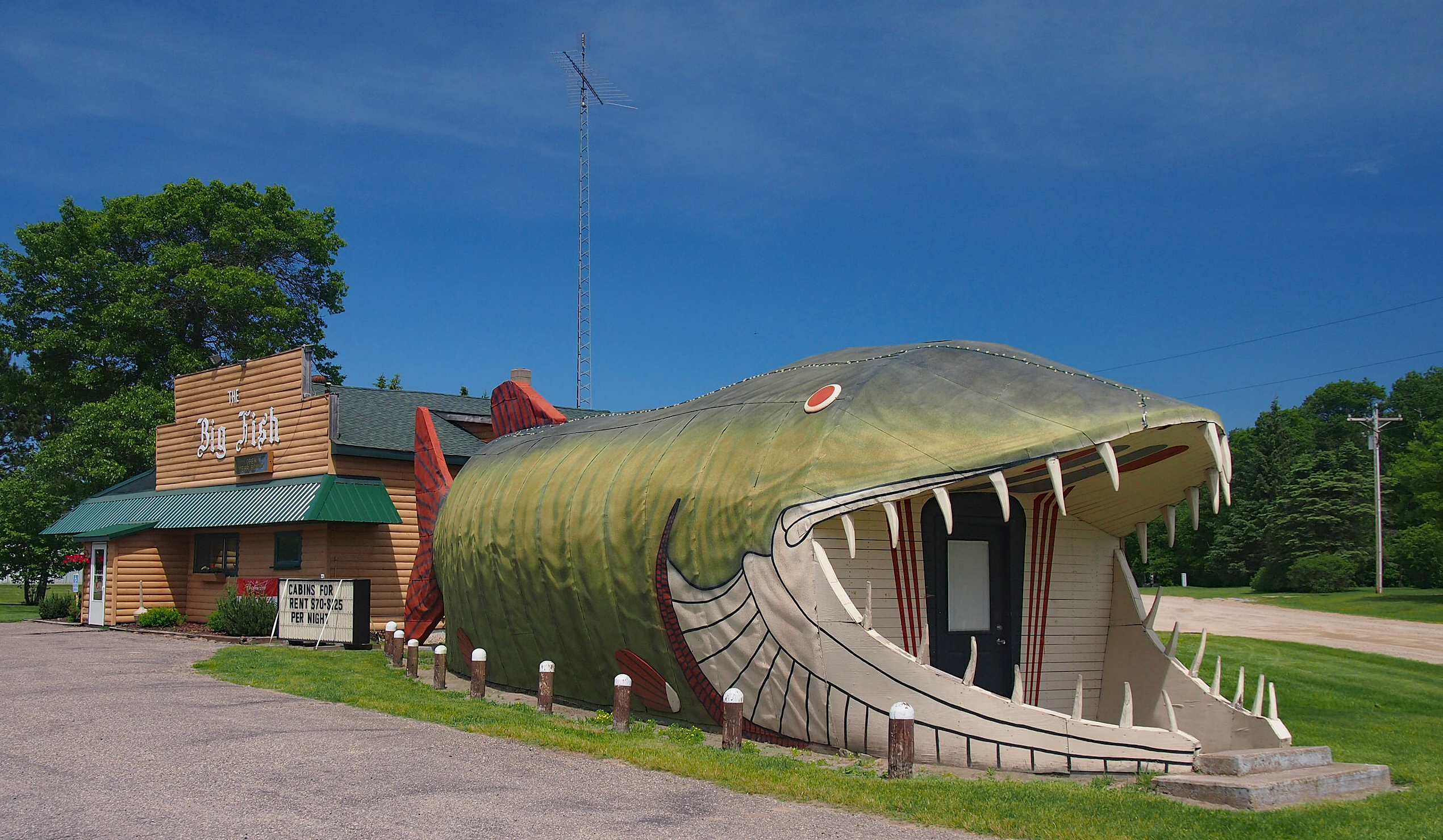
- The Big Fish and the Big Fish Supper Club in North Cass

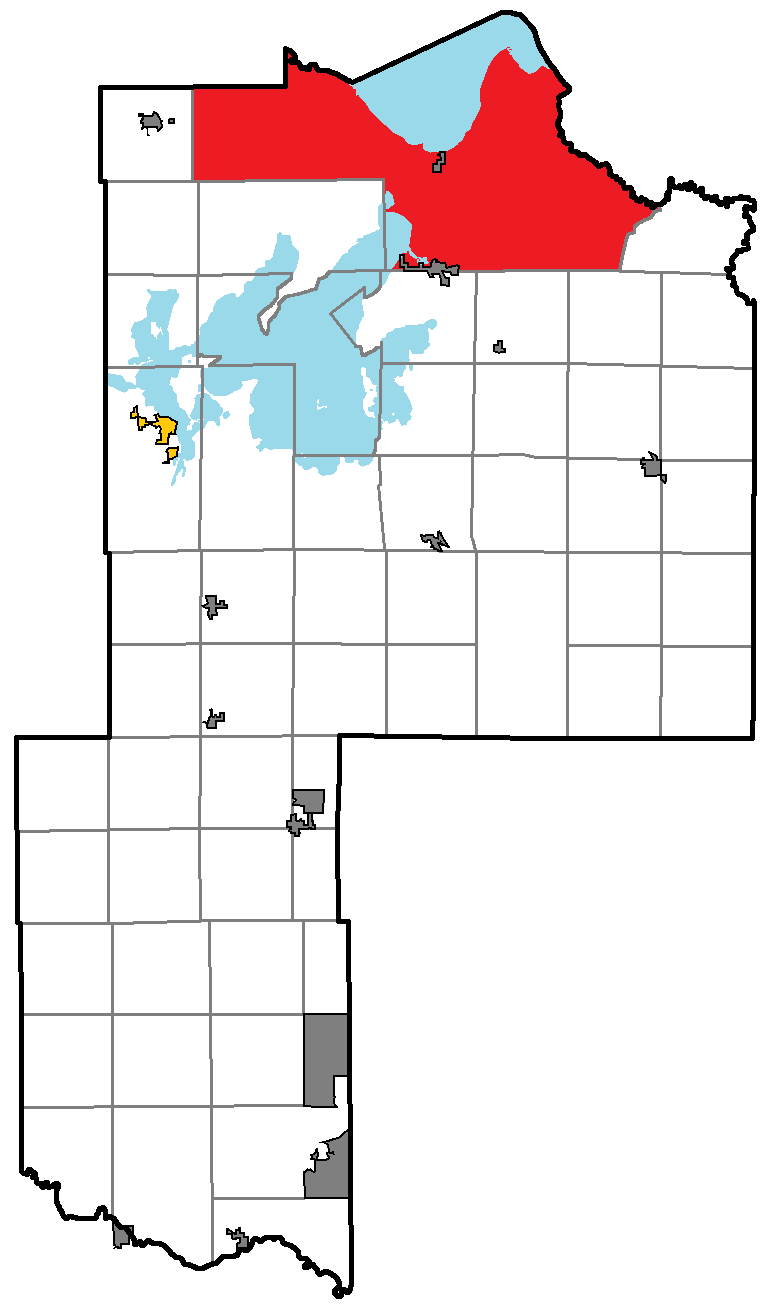
- Location of North Cass, within Cass County, Minnesota
- Country: United States
- State: Minnesota
- County: Cass

Area
  - Total: 280.6 sq mi (727 km^{2})
  - Land: 206.92 sq mi (535.9 km^{2})
  - Water: 73.67 sq mi (190.8 km^{2})

Population (2020)
  - Total: 282
  - Density: 1.36/sq mi (0.526/km^{2})
- Time zone: UTC-6 (Central (CST))
  - Summer (DST): UTC-5 (CDT)
- Area code: 218

North Cass is an unorganized territory in Cass County, Minnesota, United States. The population was 282 at the 2020 census. It is part of the Brainerd Micropolitan Statistical Area.

== Geography ==
According to the United States Census Bureau, the unorganized territory has a total area of 280.9 square miles (727.6 km^{2}), of which 207.2 square miles (536.7 km^{2}) is land and 73.7 square miles (190.9 km^{2}) (26.24%) is water.

== Demographics ==
As of the census of 2000, there were 348 people, 119 households, and 94 families residing in the unorganized territory. The population density was 1.7 inhabitants per square mile (0.66/km^{2}). There were 274 housing units at an average density of 1.3 per square mile (0.50/km^{2}). The racial makeup of the unorganized territory was 35.92% White, 63.22% Native American, 0.29% Pacific Islander, and 0.57% from two or more races. Hispanic or Latino of any race were 1.72% of the population.

There were 119 households, out of which 37.8% had children under the age of 18 living with them, 48.7% were married couples living together, 21.0% had a female householder with no husband present, and 20.2% were non-families. 17.6% of all households were made up of individuals, and 7.6% had someone living alone who was 65 years of age or older. The average household size was 2.92 and the average family size was 3.11.

In the unorganized territory the population was spread out, with 32.8% under the age of 18, 7.2% from 18 to 24, 27.0% from 25 to 44, 24.4% from 45 to 64, and 8.6% who were 65 years of age or older. The median age was 32 years. For every 100 females, there were 83.2 males. For every 100 females age 18 and over, there were 93.4 males.

The median income for a household in the unorganized territory was $30,500, and the median income for a family was $31,250. Males had a median income of $29,531 versus $15,714 for females. The per capita income for the unorganized territory was $12,751. About 21.6% of families and 24.9% of the population were below the poverty line, including 2.2% of those under age 18 and 71.4% of those age 65 or over.
