= The Big Fish (roadside attraction) =

Roadside attraction in northern Minnesota

Coordinates: 47.3516255°N 94.2666308°W

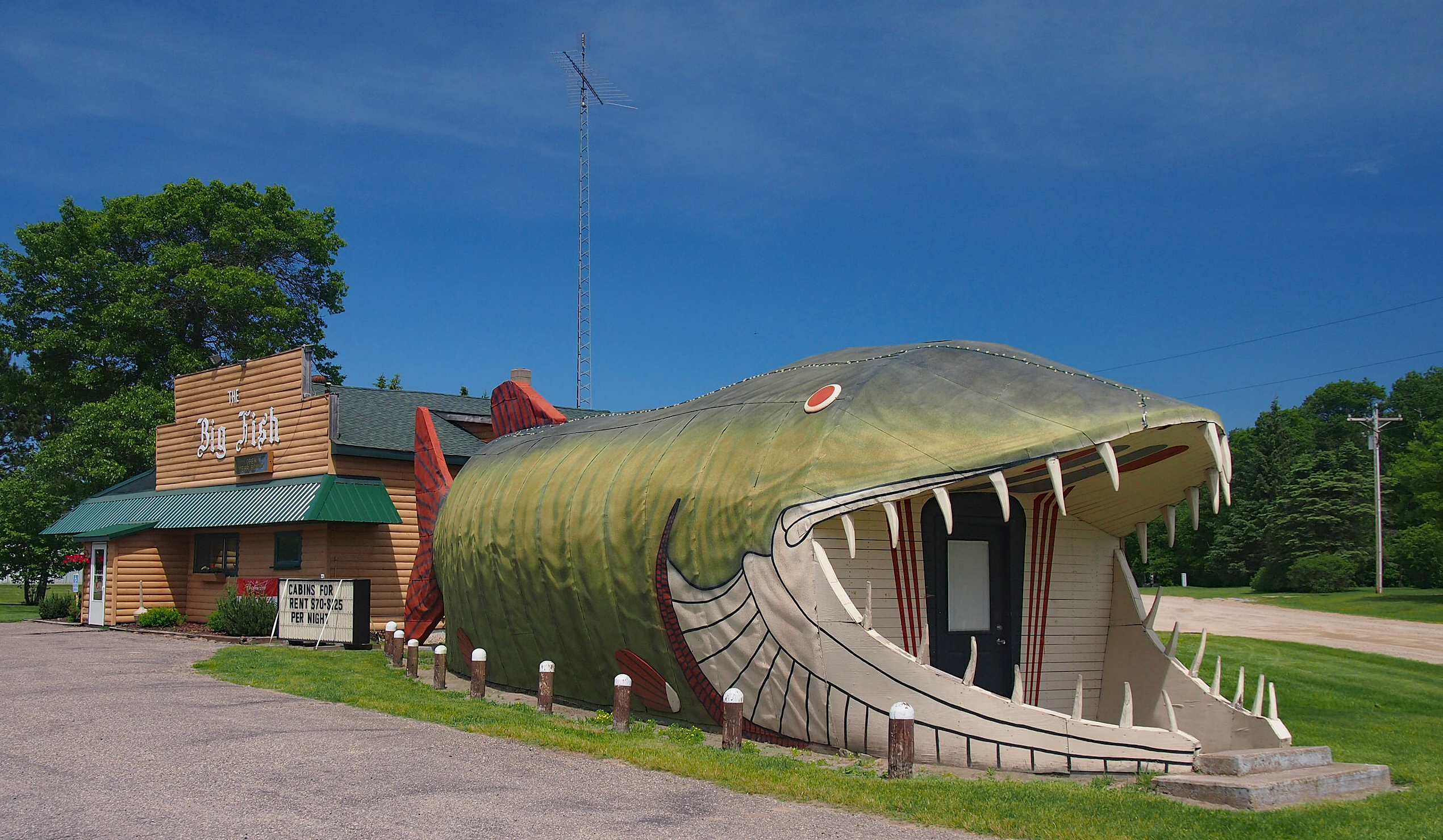
The Big Fish and the Big Fish Supper Club

The Big Fish is a roadside attraction located three miles west of Bena, Minnesota in the unorganized territory of North Cass. The 65-foot-long wooden structure takes the form of a muskie fish. The Big Fish was built as a drive-in restaurant in 1958, though it only operated as a restaurant for a few years. The Big Fish Supper Club, located next to the fish-shaped building, was opened in 1972. The Big Fish and the Big Fish Supper Club are located near the south shore of Lake Winnibigoshish, known locally as Lake Winnie.

Midwestern United States cultural historian Eric Dregni described The Big Fish as "uniquely Minnesota" and named it one the state's seven wonders, along with sites such as the Kensington Runestone and the Darwin twine ball. It is a popular spot for photographs for tourists to the area.

== Structure ==
The Big Fish is 65 feet long and 15 feet wide (19.8 and 4.6 m, respectively). The structure was built using white ash beams for a skeletal structure, covered with roofing paper and painted with stripes to resemble a muskie. The fish's red eyes were originally fashioned out of round Coca Cola signs.

== History ==
The idea of constructing a large fish to act as an attraction for tourists was conceived by Wayne Kumpula, owner of a bar on busy U.S. Route 2. Kumpula designed and built the Big Muskie Drive-In in 1958; the restaurant originally served hamburgers and ice cream. Patrons would enter the fish through the open mouth and sit to eat their meal at a counter in the fish's belly. Exposed wall studs mimicked the curving ribs of a fish. There was also a walk-up window in the side of the structure for take-out ordering. In 1963 the restaurant was converted into a souvenir stand. A log building was constructed next door and in 1972 both buildings became the Big Fish Supper Club. After 1972, the fish building was used only as storage space.

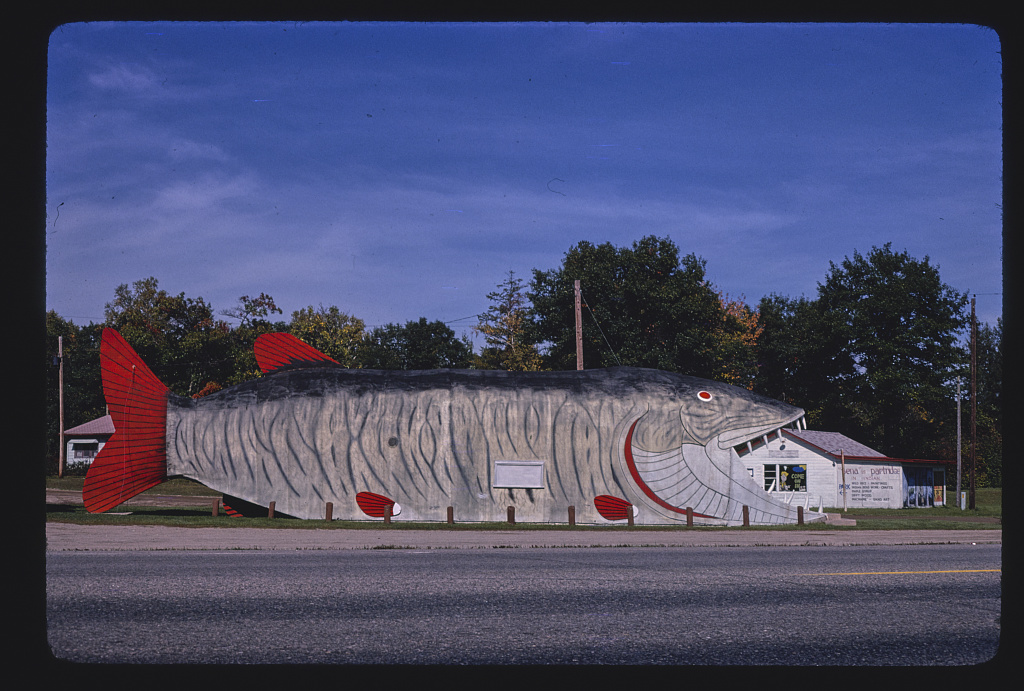
The Big Fish photographed by John Margolies in 1980

The structure was listed on Preservation Alliance of Minnesota's annual list of 10 Most Endangered Historic Places in 2009 after it fell into disrepair and its frame was in danger of rotting. The Preservation Alliance referred to the fish as "the superlative example of Minnesota's biggest aquatic life form, the muskie." Within months of being listed as endangered, funds were raised for the fish to be repaired and repainted.

The Big Fish appeared on Charles Kuralt's On the Road television feature; Kuralt called it his favorite building in America. A postcard image of the fish also appears in the opening credits of the 1983 film National Lampoon's Vacation.
