= Turtle Mountain College =

Tribal land-grant college in Belcourt, North Dakota, U.S.

Coordinates: 48°53′01″N 99°45′03″W

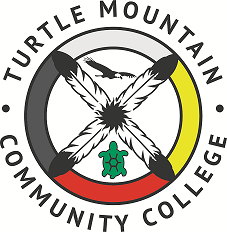
- Motto in English: Creating a World of Opportunities
- Type: Private tribal land-grant college
- Established: 1972; 54 years ago
- Academic affiliations: Space-grant
- President: Wanda Parisien
- Location: Belcourt, North Dakota, United States
- Campus: Urban/suburban reserve
- Nickname: Mighty Mickinocks
- Website: tm.edu

Turtle Mountain College is a private tribal land-grant college in Belcourt, North Dakota. It is located ten miles (16 km) from the Canada–US border in Turtle Mountain, the north central portion of North Dakota. In 2012, TMCC's enrollment was 630 full- and part-time certificate and degree-seeking students.

== History ==
TMCC was founded by the Turtle Mountain Band of Chippewa Indians in 1972. TMCC was chartered to the Turtle Mountain Band of Chippewa Indians in November, 1972. In 1994, the college was designated a land-grant college alongside 31 other tribal colleges.

In 2025, the institution's name changed from Turtle Mountain Community College to Turtle Mountain College.

Wanda Parisien became the college's president in May 2025, after serving as interim president for eight months.

In November 2025, the college announced a $22 million gift from philanthropist MacKenzie Scott, its largest ever private donation.

== Campus ==
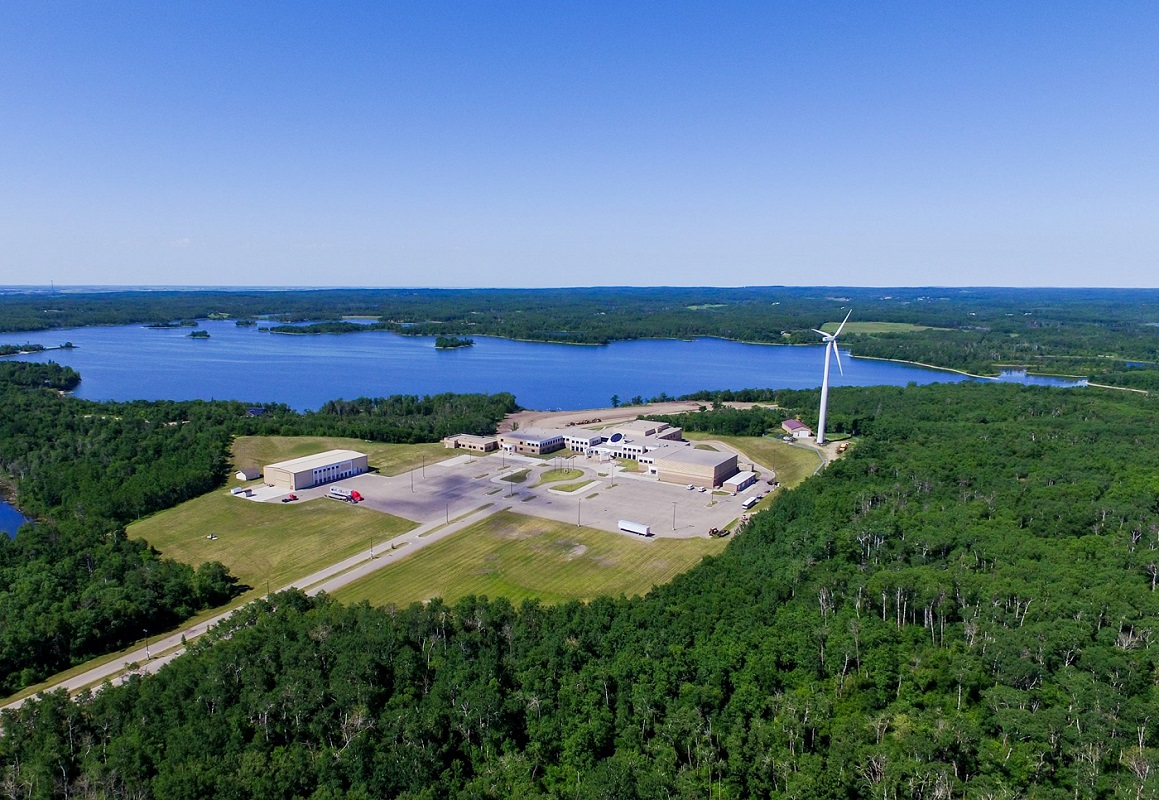
Turtle Mountain College

The main campus is located just north of the unincorporated city of Belcourt. Belcourt is the center of the reservation community's government, commerce, and education for the more than 31,000 enrolled members of the tribe. The main campus houses a 165,000-square-foot academic building on an approximately 123-acre site. The facility houses technology, finance, general classrooms, science, math and engineering classrooms and labs, library and archives, learning resource centers, faculty area, student services area including a student union, gymnasium, auditorium, career and technical education facility, and mechanical. A wind turbine was erected in 2008 to serve as a source of power to the main campus.

== Academics ==
Undergraduate demographics as of Fall 2023
Race and ethnicity	Total
American Indian/Alaska Native	97%
White	2%
Economic diversity
Low-income (Note: The percentage of students who received an income-based federal Pell grant intended for low-income students.)	68%
Affluent (Note: The percentage of students who are a part of the American middle class at the bare minimum.)	32%

Turtle Mountain College offers Bachelor of Science, Associate of Arts, Associate of Science, Associate of Applied Science degrees and certificate.

== Partnerships ==
TMCC is a member of the American Indian Higher Education Consortium (AIHEC), which is a community of tribally and federally chartered institutions working to strengthen tribal nations and make a lasting difference in the lives of American Indians and Alaska Natives. TMCC was created in response to the higher education needs of American Indians. TMCC generally serves geographically isolated populations that have no other means of accessing education beyond the high school level.

== Athletics ==
Turtle Mountain competes in the Northern Intercollegiate Athletic Conference and the USCAA. The team nickname is the Mighty Mikinocks. The school fields teams in men's and women's basketball.

== See also ==
- American Indian College Fund (AICF)
