= Donald D. Lundrigan =

American lawyer

Donald D. Lundrigan (October 28, 1910 – December 25, 1990) was an American lawyer and politician.

Lundrigan was born in Cass Lake, Minnesota and received his law degree in 1935 from the University of Minnesota Law School. He was admitted to the Minnesota bar. He lived with his wife and family in Walker, Minnesota. Lundrigan served in the United States Navy during World War and was commissioned a lieutenant. He served in the Minnesota House of Representatives from 1937 to 1940. Lundrigan died in Crow Wing County, Minnesota.
