= Elaine Fleming =

American mayor

Elaine Fleming is a former mayor of Cass Lake, Minnesota, a position she held from 2003-2006. Cass Lake—officially a city, but with a population under 1,000 people—is located within the reservation boundaries of the Leech Lake Band of Ojibwe. Fleming was the first Native person (Ojibwe) and woman to be elected mayor of Cass Lake. She is aligned with the Green Party of Minnesota and is one of the organizers of Rock the Vote - Rez Style. Fleming was elected mayor for her first term by seven votes, and won via a write-in campaign for her second term.

Cass Lake is a Superfund site, as a result of chemical dumping by the St. Regis Paper Company, which operated from 1957 to 1985. Fleming has characterized St. Regis's activities as environmental racism which, in turn she has characterized as "terrorism in our communities". She, along with other Cass Lake community members, have been negatively affected by the pollution caused by St. Regis. Aside from environmental justice, Fleming has also been a vocal advocate for Indigenous food sovereignty.

She has been an instructor at Leech Lake Tribal College for more than 30 years, teaching Ojibwe culture and history.

Fleming has been involved in animal rescue since 2011.

Fleming was on a committee that researched and commissioned a statue of Shaynowishkung, an Ojibwe spokesman from the mid nineteenth century; the statue was unveiled in 2015.
