= Skip Finn =

American politician

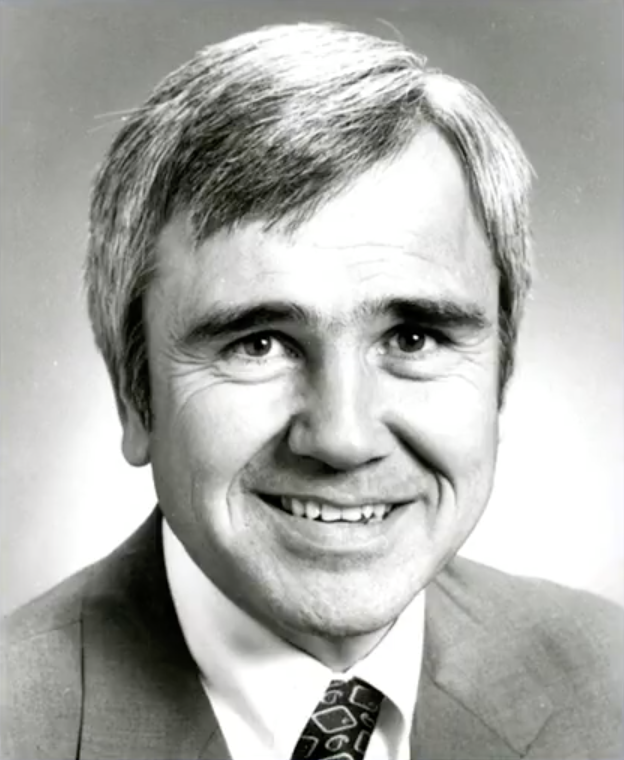

Member of the Minnesota Senate from the 4th district
- In office January 8, 1991 – July 1, 1996

Personal details
- Born: Harold Raymond Finn; October 27, 1948 Cass Lake, Minnesota, U.S.
- Died: May 17, 2018 (aged 69) Minneapolis, Minnesota, U.S.
- Party: Minnesota Democratic–Farmer–Labor Party
- Spouse: Teri Backer (m. 1980–2018)
- Children: 2
- Education: University of Minnesota Law School
- Occupation: Attorney

Harold Raymond "Skip" Finn (October 27, 1948 – May 17, 2018) was an American politician, who represented Minnesota's 4th district in the Minnesota Senate as a member of the Democratic-Farmer-Labor Party.

== Biography ==
Born in Cass Lake, Minnesota, to a Norwegian father and a Native American mother, Finn was a member of the Leech Lake Band of Ojibwe. He attended Moorhead State College (now Minnesota State University Moorhead) for three years, studying sociology and American Indian studies. He transferred to the University of Minnesota College of Liberal Arts, earning a Bachelor of Arts degree in 1971, the first alumnus to receive a degree in American Indian studies. He later returned to the U of M Law School to receive his Juris Doctor in 1979.

Finn worked as an Ojibwe attorney and owned a small business, then ran for a Minnesota Senate seat in 1990. He became the first Native American to serve as a Minnesota senator in 1991. He was the majority whip for the 78th and 79th Minnesota Legislatures. He served Minnesota's 4th state Senate district until his resignation in July 1996 after being convicted of fraud.

== Fraud conviction ==
In October 1995, Finn and two others were brought up on charges of conspiring to steal about US$1 million from the Leech Lake Band, as well as theft and mail fraud charges. Finn was sentenced to nearly five years in prison and fined $100,000.

== Personal life ==
Finn married his wife Teri (née Becker) in 1980. They have two children. His daughter, Jamie Becker-Finn, currently serves in the Minnesota House of Representatives.

Finn died at the University of Minnesota Medical Center in Minneapolis on May 17, 2018. He was 69.
