= Cass Lake-Bena Schools =

School district in Minnesota, United States

Cass Lake-Bena

Location
- Minnesota; United States

Other information
- Website: www.clbs.k12.mn.us

Cass Lake-Bena Schools (CLBS, School District #115) is a school district headquartered in Cass Lake, Minnesota. The district is on the Leech Lake Indian Reservation.

Within Cass County it serves Cass Lake and Bena. It also serves portions of Beltrami and Hubbard counties.

== History ==
In 2018 the superintendent, Rochelle Johnson, was a finalist for the cabinet of Governor of Minnesota Tim Walz.

== Schools ==
- High School (grades 9–12)
  - Nevin Duncan served as principal from August 1979 until 1980. He was accused of disproportionately putting punishment on Native American students. In July 1980 Duncan resigned with the board voting 5 to 1 to accept the resignation. Parents planned to file a lawsuit over Duncan's rule, and did not drop the plans after his resignation.
- Middle School (grades 5–8)
- Elementary School (grades K-4)
