= Leech Lake Tribal College =

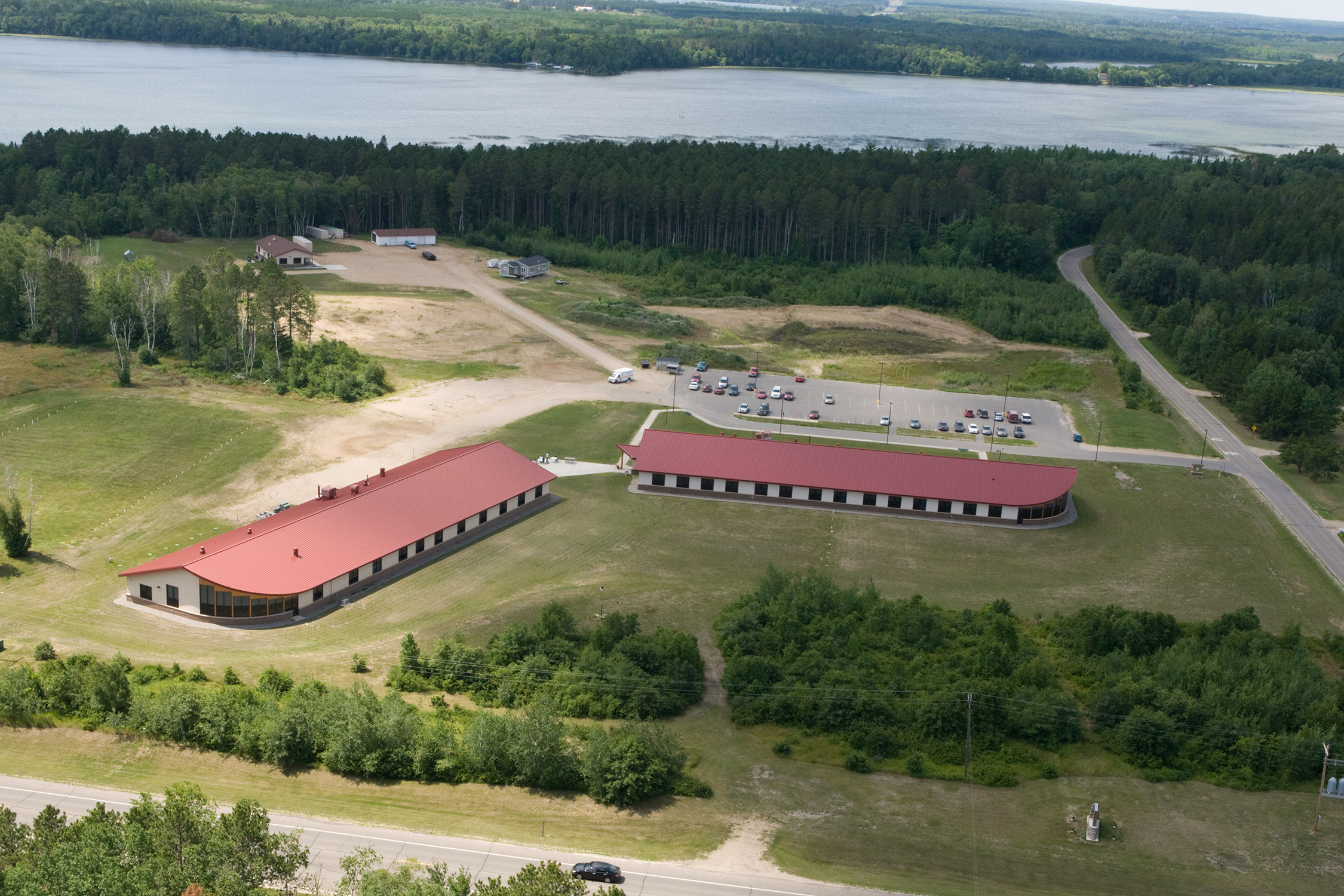
- Motto: Be Different, Be Unique
- Type: Public tribal land-grant community college
- Established: 1990
- Academic affiliations: Space-grant
- Administrative staff: 70
- Location: Cass Lake, Minnesota, United States; 47°23′45″N 94°39′05″W
- Campus: Rural
- Website: www.lltc.edu

Leech Lake Tribal College (LLTC) is a public tribal land-grant community college in Cass Lake, Minnesota. It was established in 1990 and designated a land-grant college in 1994. The college includes approximately 70 faculty, staff, administrators, and 250 students. Most students come from the Leech Lake and Red Lake Reservations, and approximately 8% of the student population consists of non-Indian students.

== History ==
The Leech Lake Tribal Council established LLTC in July 1990. For two years, courses were offered in extension from the University of Minnesota Duluth, Bemidji State University, Itasca Community College and Central Lakes College (then known as Brainerd Community College). In the fall quarter of 1992, LLTC began offering its own courses leading toward the Associate of Arts and the Associate of Applied Science degrees.

In 1994, the college was designated a land-grant college alongside 31 other tribal colleges. That same year, 17 graduates completed their Associate of Arts degrees and Associate of Applied Science degrees. By the spring of 1995, the number of graduates had increased to 24. The 2007–08 academic year saw record student enrollment; the 2008 graduating class was the largest in LLTC history.

== Campus ==
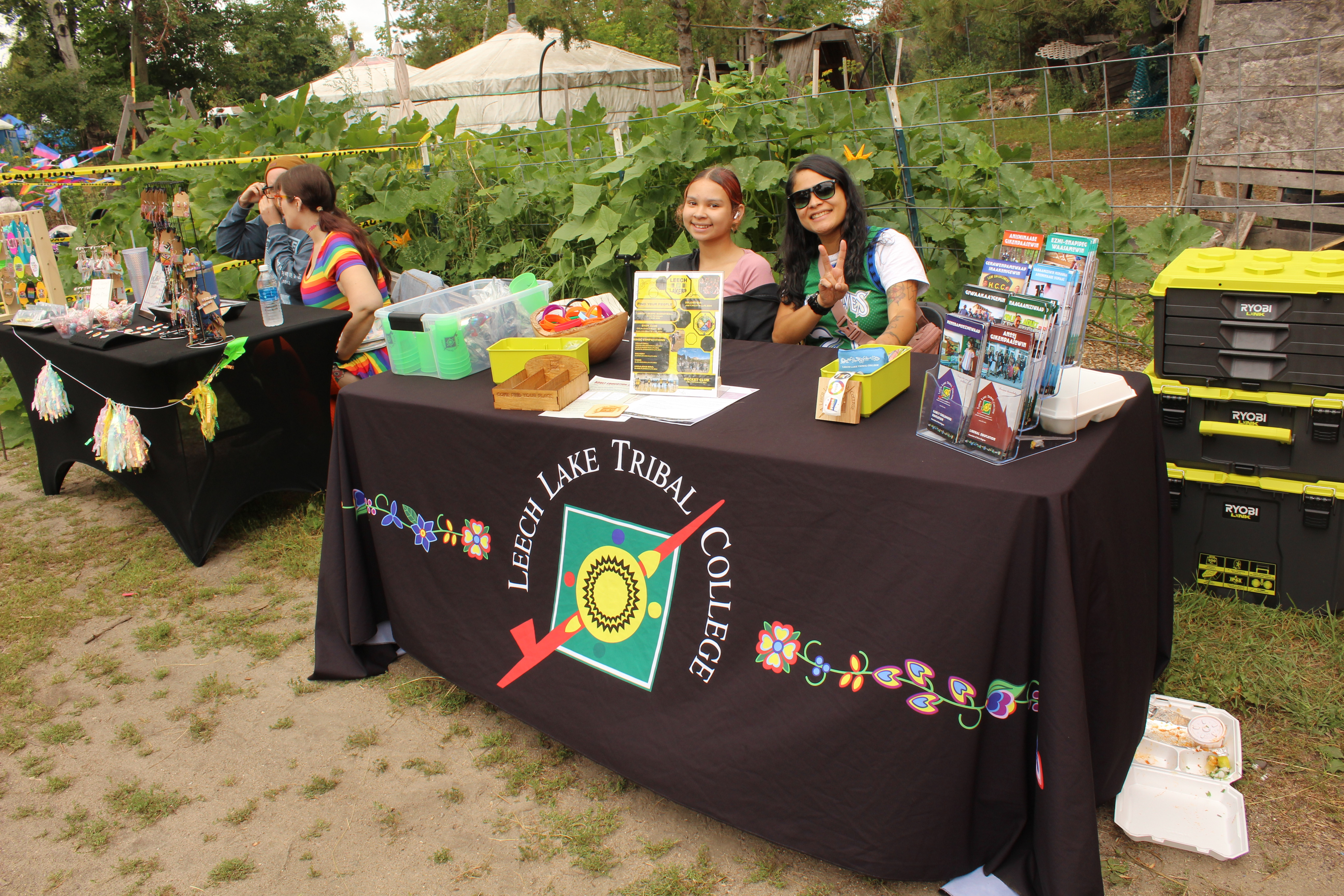
Tabling at Bemidji Pride, 2025

Undergraduate demographics as of Fall 2023
Race and ethnicity	Total
American Indian/Alaska Native	91%
White	7%
Two or more races	2%
Black	1%
Economic diversity
Low-income (Note: The percentage of students who received an income-based federal Pell grant intended for low-income students.)	82%
Affluent (Note: The percentage of students who are a part of the American middle class at the bare minimum.)	18%

LLTC is located on the Leech Lake Indian Reservation in north central Minnesota, three miles northwest of the town of Cass Lake. The campus houses two academic wings, a library with a Learning Center and computer lab, three technical training buildings, and a community garden, among other facilities. The campus covers approximately 22 acres of leased land.

LLTC originally held classes in available buildings throughout the city of Cass Lake and towns throughout the Leech Lake Reservation, including a log cabin adjacent to MN HWY 2, an old church, and random houses in Cass Lake. The college moved classrooms and administration to the former Cass Lake High School building in the fall of 1994. In 2005, the college moved to its current location 3 miles west of Cass Lake. In 2015, the college opened a $2.7 million community library, Bezhigoogahbow Library, named after the college founder and first President, Larry P. Aitken.

== Partnerships ==
The college was accredited as a vocational school in 1993. It was awarded candidacy status with the Higher Learning Commission of the North Central Association in 2002 and in April 2006 the Higher Learning Commission bestowed full accreditation on LLTC.

LLTC is a member of the American Indian Higher Education Consortium (AIHEC). LLTC generally serves geographically isolated populations.

The LLTC is a member of the National Association of Land Grant Institutions. The LLTC receives its base funding from the Bureau of Indian Affairs under the authority of the Tribally Controlled Community College Act (Title I, P.L. 95-471).

The college has articulation agreements and partnerships with Bemidji State University, Augsburg College, University of Minnesota Duluth, Metropolitan State University, Hibbing Community College, University of North Dakota, and others.

== Governance ==
The Leech Lake Tribal Council adopted the original LLTC Charter in 1999 and established an independent board of trustees. In 2003, Leech Lake Tribal College separated from the Tribal Council and assumed its own accounting and human resources functions. The IRS has granted 501(c)(3) status to LLTC as a non-profit educational entity. While separately incorporated today, LLTC still enjoys a vital relationship with tribal government and receives about 11% of its annual funding from the Leech Lake Tribal Council.

== Athletics ==
LLTC competes as the Lakers within the Northern Intercollegiate Athletic Conference.

== Notable staff, faculty, and alumni ==
- Elaine Fleming, Arts and Humanities Department, Former Mayor City of Cass Lake, Minnesota
