= Bug-O-Nay-Ge-Shig School =

Native American school in Minnesota, United States

Coordinates: 47.3613°N 94.3074°W

Bug-O-Nay-Ge-Shig School is a K-12 tribal school in unincorporated Cass County, Minnesota, near Bena. It is affiliated with the Bureau of Indian Education (BIE). Located on the Leech Lake Indian Reservation, it serves the Leech Lake Band of Ojibwe. It is nicknamed the "Bug School".

The name means 'Hole in the Day'.

== History ==
The school first opened in 1975. A new facility opened around 1985. It was built as a bus barn and school for automobile mechanics, and it got the name "pole barn". This facility served as the high school, while K-8 classes were in a separate facility that, by November 2014, was in a better condition.

Circa the 2000s, the school community began advocating for a new school. In winter 2014, due to snow, a section of the roof collapsed. By 2015, the editorial board of the Minneapolis Star-Tribune advocated for an urgent replacement of the school. The editorial board cited a sewer system that fails during periods of extreme cold and periods of rodents causing infestations. Jill Burcum, the writer of the editorials, was a finalist for the Pulitzer Prize due to these stories.

In 2016, the United States Department of the Interior got a $12 million grant for a new school for Bug-O-Nay-Ge-Shig. The current 44,000-square-foot (4,100 m^{2}) facility, which cost $14.5 million, opened in 2018.

== Student body ==
The high school building had about 100 students, and there were 200 students total for all of K-12, both in 2015.

== Curriculum ==
In addition to traditional subjects, Native culture is heavily integrated into the school's programs, while school district-operated public schools mostly follow dominant Euro-American curriculum with some Native cultural units.
