= Flour City Ornamental Iron Works Company =

Flour City Ornamental Iron Works Company

Flour City Ornamental Iron Works Company was an early pioneer in the manufacturing of architectural wrought and cast iron building components.

== Historical significance ==
Flour City Ornamental Iron Works Company was founded by Eugene Tetzlaff in 1893 in Minneapolis, Minnesota. The company was originally a blacksmith shop, but later, it became a manufacturer of wrought and cast iron.

During World War II, Flour City produced aluminum bridge pontoons and aircraft parts. In 1945, Henry J. Neils, first president of the Flour City Ornamental Iron Works Company, began production of aluminum boats. The first aluminum boat produced by Flour City subsidiary, Alumacraft, came off the production line in 1946. Hupp Corporation bought Alumacraft from Flour City, in 1960.

== Later history ==
Flour City Ornamental Iron Works, later known as Flour City Architectural Metal Works, continued its production of ornamental and architectural metal products. In the early 1990s, Flour City became a part of Flour City International, Inc., and its headquarters moved from Minnesota to Tennessee.

== List of Buildings with Flour City Ornamental Iron ==
- The Department of Veterans Affairs Building, Washington, DC
- Drake Hotel, Chicago, IL
- John Adams Building, Washington, DC
- Mayo Clinic, Rochester, MN
- Nissen Building, Winston-Salem, NC
- The Palmer House Hotel, Chicago, IL

== List of Buildings with Flour City Architectural Metals, Mpls, MN & Johnson City, TN ==
- Key Towers, Cleveland, OH
- Rock-n-Roll Hall of Fame and Museum, Cleveland, OH
- The Palace Hotel, New York, New York
- Warner Bros. Office Building, Los Angeles, CA
- The Vista Hotel (attached to the World Trade Center in New York, New York)
- The National Gallery of Art, Washington, D.C.
- Trump World Tower, Manhattan, NY
- New York Hospital (The FDR Building), New York, NY
- Boston Federal Courthouse, Boston, MA
- 320 Park Avenue (Mutual of America), New York, NY
- 660 Madison Avenue (Barneys New York), New York, NY
- 565 Fifth Avenue, New York, NY
- 601 Lexington Avenue (Citigroup Center), New York, NY
- US Air/LaGuardia Airport East End Terminal, Queens, NY
- Metrotech "A" (Brooklyn Union Gas Co. - BUGCo), Brooklyn, NY
- 575 Lexington Avenue, New York, NY
- Citicorp Court Square, Long Island City, NY
- IBM Complex, Somers, NY
- Allied Bank Tower (First Interstate Bank), Dallas, TX
- Jacob Javits Convention Center (Smoke Wall), New York, NY
- O'Hare Airport (United Airlines Terminal, Chicago, IL
- Equitable Insurance Building, New York, NY
- Society Bank Tower, Cleveland, OH
- Library Square, Los Angeles, CA
- Daniel Moynihan Courthouse, Manhattan Southern District, NY
- Four Seasons Hotel, Brickell Ave, Miami FL
