= Bena, Minnesota =

City in Minnesota, United States

Bena Gibaakwa'igaansing (Ojibwe)
- City
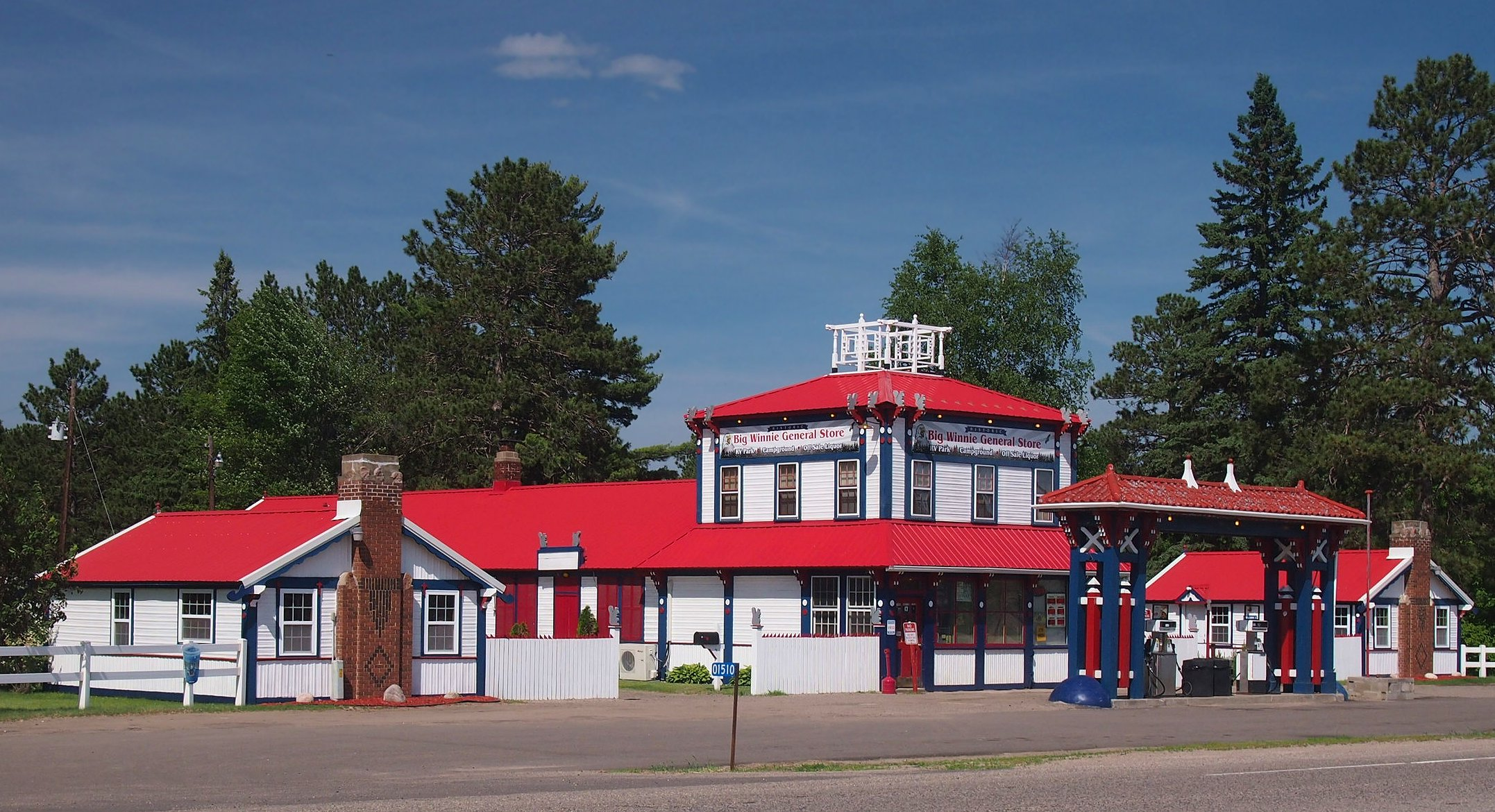
- Big Winnie General Store

- Location of Bena within Cass County, Minnesota
- Coordinates: 47°20′26″N 94°12′22″W
- Country: United States
- State: Minnesota
- County: Cass

Area
  - Total: 0.51 sq mi (1.32 km^{2})
  - Land: 0.51 sq mi (1.31 km^{2})
  - Water: 0.0039 sq mi (0.01 km^{2})
- Elevation: 1,309 ft (399 m)

Population (2020)
  - Total: 143
  - Density: 283.2/sq mi (109.33/km^{2})
- Time zone: UTC-6 (Central (CST))
  - Summer (DST): UTC-5 (CDT)
- ZIP code: 56626
- Area code: 218
- FIPS code: 27-05104
- GNIS feature ID: 2394131

Bena (/ˈbiːnə/ BEE-nə, Ojibwe: Gibaakwa'igaansing) is a city in Cass County, Minnesota, United States. The population was 143 at the 2020 census. It is part of the Brainerd Micropolitan Statistical Area.

== History ==
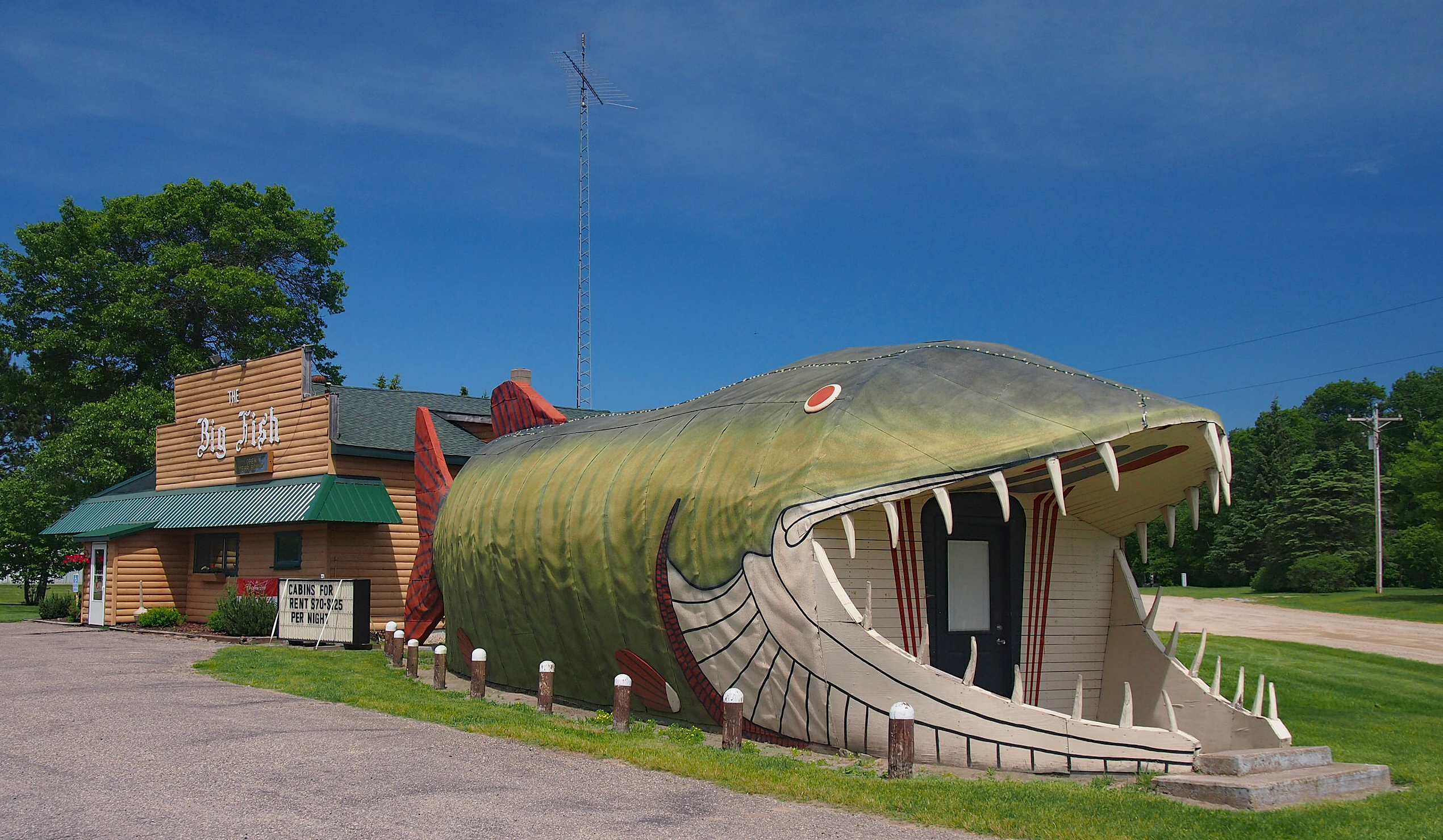
The Big Fish and the Big Fish Supper Club

A post office called Bena has been in operation since 1898. Bena is a type of bird mentioned in the poem The Song of Hiawatha. The Ojibwe word bina' is the word for partridge, a very common bird in this area.

Both the Big Fish Supper Club and the Big Winnie General Store are landmarks associated with the city of Bena.

From 1901-1911, the Bena Boarding School, an American Indian residential school, operated in Bena. Hundreds of Native American students were brought to the school.

Late in World War II, a logging camp manned by prisoners of war was located at the site of an old CCC camp near Bena. Two German POWs escaped from the camp in 1944 for a short period.

== Geography ==
According to the United States Census Bureau, the city has a total area of 0.50 square miles (1.29 km^{2}), all land. Bena is located along U.S. Highway 2 and Cass County Road 8.

== Demographics ==
Historical population
Census	Pop.	Note	%±
1910	179		—
1920	205		14.5%
1930	145		−29.3%
1940	319		120.0%
1950	331		3.8%
1960	286		−13.6%
1970	169		−40.9%
1980	153		−9.5%
1990	147		−3.9%
2000	110		−25.2%
2010	116		5.5%
2020	143		23.3%
U.S. Decennial Census

=== 2010 census ===
As of the census of 2010, there were 116 people, 43 households, and 24 families living in the city. The population density was 232.0 inhabitants per square mile (89.6/km^{2}). There were 60 housing units at an average density of 120.0 per square mile (46.3/km^{2}). The racial makeup of the city was 19.8% White, 69.0% Native American, and 11.2% from two or more races. Hispanic or Latino of any race were 0.9% of the population.

There were 43 households, of which 37.2% had children under the age of 18 living with them, 18.6% were married couples living together, 20.9% had a female householder with no husband present, 16.3% had a male householder with no wife present, and 44.2% were non-families. 41.9% of all households were made up of individuals, and 16.3% had someone living alone who was 65 years of age or older. The average household size was 2.70 and the average family size was 3.79.

The median age in the city was 30.5 years. 32.8% of residents were under the age of 18; 8.6% were between the ages of 18 and 24; 22.5% were from 25 to 44; 23.3% were from 45 to 64; and 12.9% were 65 years of age or older. The gender makeup of the city was 48.3% male and 51.7% female.

=== 2000 census ===
As of the census of 2000, there were 110 people, 48 households, and 31 families living in the city. The population density was 218.0 inhabitants per square mile (84.2/km^{2}). There were 72 housing units at an average density of 142.7 per square mile (55.1/km^{2}). The racial makeup of the city was 24.55% White, 70.00% Native American, and 5.45% from two or more races.

There were 48 households, out of which 27.1% had children under the age of 18 living with them, 31.3% were married couples living together, 22.9% had a female householder with no husband present, and 35.4% were non-families. 33.3% of all households were made up of individuals, and 10.4% had someone living alone who was 65 years of age or older. The average household size was 2.29 and the average family size was 2.90.

In the city, the population was spread out, with 27.3% under the age of 18, 10.9% from 18 to 24, 19.1% from 25 to 44, 25.5% from 45 to 64, and 17.3% who were 65 years of age or older. The median age was 36 years. For every 100 females, there were 103.7 males. For every 100 females age 18 and over, there were 105.1 males.

The median income for a household in the city was $11,563, and the median income for a family was $6,563. Males had a median income of $17,083 versus $19,063 for females. The per capita income for the city was $7,619. There were 73.7% of families and 58.0% of the population living below the poverty line, including 95.0% of under eighteens and 26.7% of those over 64.

== Education ==
Education in Bena has been defined by a complex history of federal Indian policy, public school consolidation, and a modern drive for culturally responsive tribal education.

In the early 20th century, education in Bena was central to the federal government's assimilationist policies. The Bena Boarding School operated from 1901 to 1911 as a federal Indian boarding school. Like similar institutions across Minnesota, it was designed to strip Indigenous children of their cultural identity, often subjecting them to harsh discipline, manual labor, and overcrowding that facilitated the spread of diseases.

Following the closure of the boarding school, students in the area largely attended public schools. By the 1970s, however, dissatisfaction with the public system's inability to meet the cultural and academic needs of Ojibwe students led to a pivotal shift. In 1975, following a walkout by 70 Indigenous students from the local public high school, the Leech Lake Band of Ojibwe founded the Bug-O-Nay-Ge-Shig School.

Named after an Ojibwe leader who fought for his people's land and future, the school initially operated in temporary facilities. For decades, the high school program was housed in a retrofitted metal pole barn- originally a bus garage- that suffered from heating failures, rodent infestations, and structural hazards. Today, Bena is primarily served by the Cass Lake-Bena Schools district.

The tribal K-12 school, Bug-O-Nay-Ge-Shig School, has a Bena address but is not in the city limits. This school has evolved into a fully accredited K-12 magnet school. In 2018, after years of lobbying by tribal leaders and Minnesota lawmakers, a new $14.5 million high school facility was opened to replace the dilapidated "pole barn," marking a significant victory for educational equity in the region.
