= John Smith (Chippewa) =

Ojibwe chief (died 1922)

(Chief) John Smith
- Gaa-binagwewens
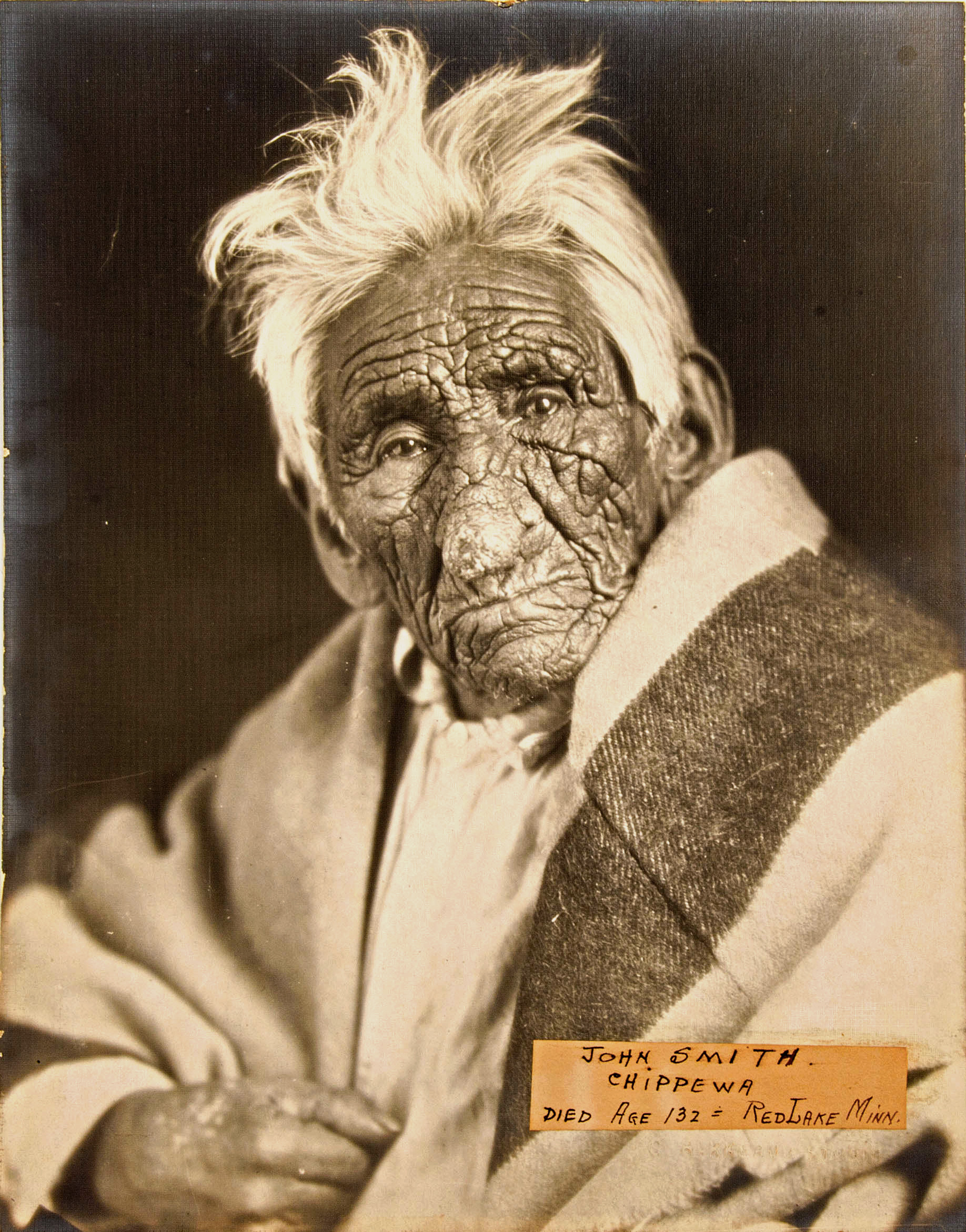
- Smith c. 1915
- Born: Between 1822 and 1826
- Died: February 6, 1922 (aged 96–100); Cass Lake, Minnesota, U.S.
- Other names: Chief John Smith; Kahbe nags wens; Ka-be-na-gwe-wes; Ka-be-nah-gwey-wence; Kay-bah-nung-we-way; Ga-Be-Nah-Gewn-Wonce
- Citizenship: Chippewa Indian
- Known for: Longevity claimant, Indian tribal chief

Chief John Smith (Note: Ojibwe: Gaa-binagwewe(ns), lit. '(little) which the flesh peels off', recorded variously as Kahbe nagwi wens, Ka-be-na-gwe-wes, Ka-be-nah-gwey-wence, Kay-bah-nung-we-way or Ga-Be-Nah-Gewn-Wonce—translated into English as "Sloughing Flesh", "Wrinkle Meat", or "Old Wrinkled Meat") was a Chippewa (Ojibwe) Native American who lived in the area of Cass Lake, Minnesota. It is thought he was born between 1822 and 1826, and he died on February 6, 1922. Some sources place his birth as early as 1787. His extreme age was noted in the 1918 French annual periodical Almanach Vernot, for the day 6 September, where his name was reported as "Flèche Rapide" or "Rapid Arrow". It also said the Ojibwa called him "Ba-be-nar-quor-yarg". In 1920, two years before his death, he appeared as the main feature in a motion picture exhibition that toured the United States, featuring aged Native Americans.

== Biography ==
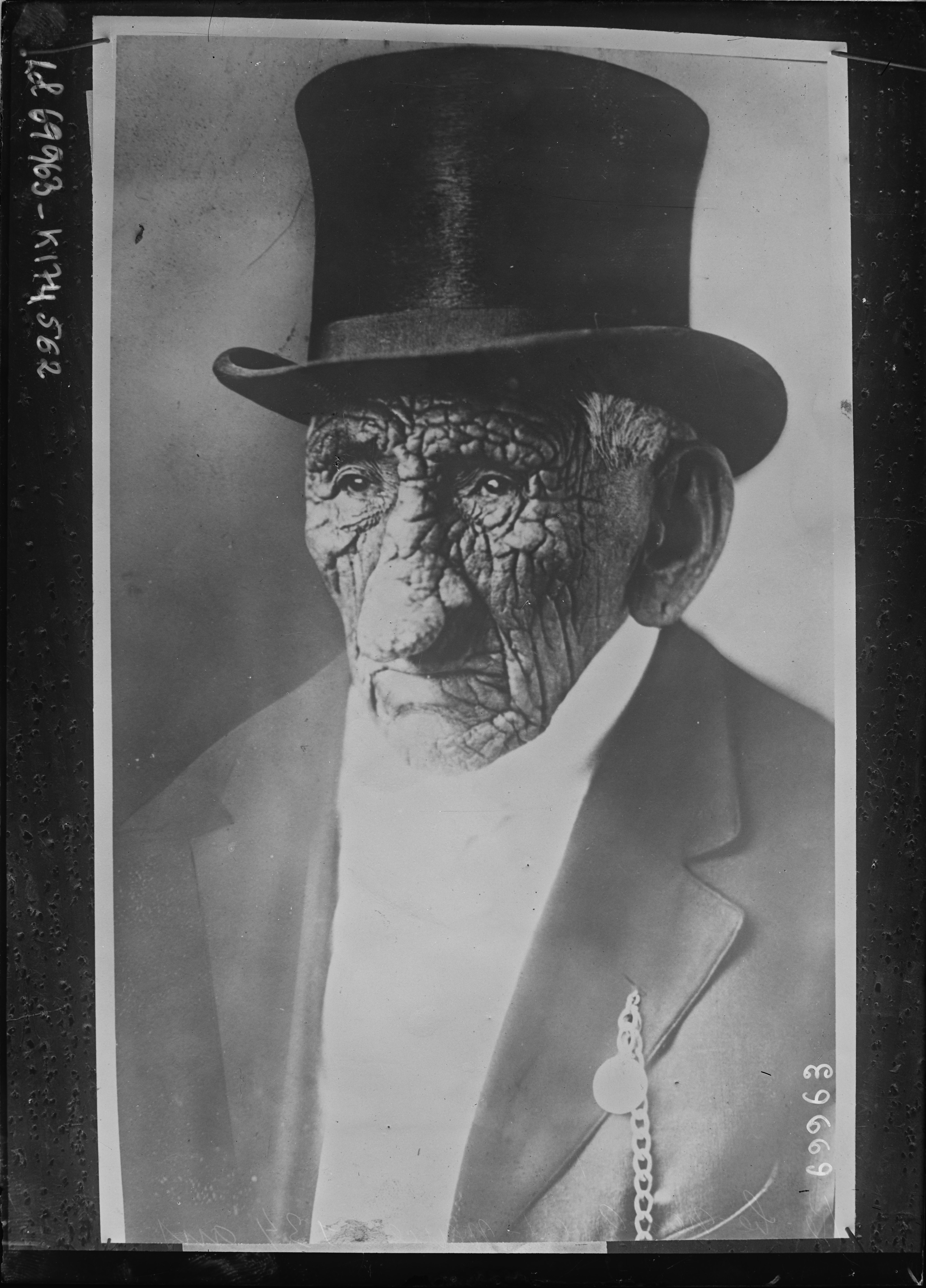
Smith in 1921

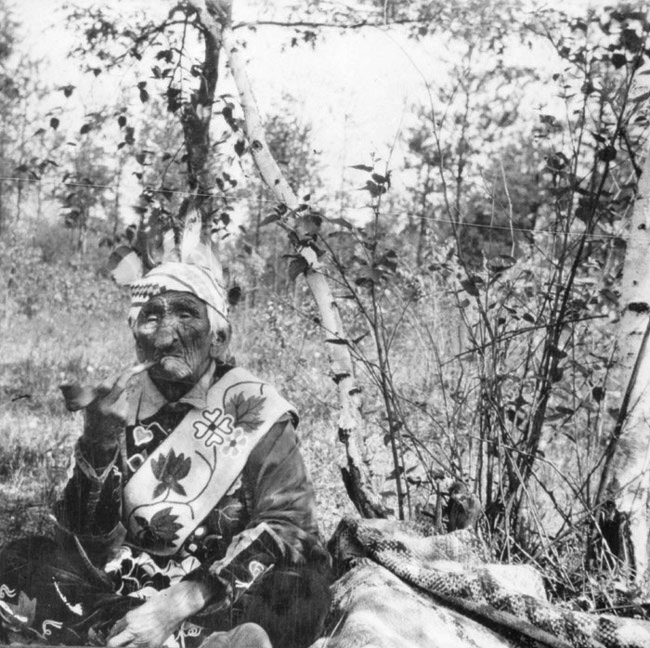
Chief John Smith Photo courtesy of the Minnesota Historical Society

It is thought that Smith was born between 1822 and 1826. Some sources place his birth as early as 1787, which would have made him 137 years old when he died of pneumonia on February 6, 1922, at Cass Lake, Minnesota. He lived his entire life in the Cass Lake area and was known as "The Old Indian" to the local European settlers. He had eight wives and an adopted son, named Tom Smith.

Local photographers, notably including C. N. Christensen of Cass Lake, used him as a model for numerous stylized images of Ojibwe life, which were widely distributed as cabinet photos and postcards. Smith would carry cartes de visite of himself, selling them to visitors. He was known to travel for free on the trains running through the Reservation, selling his photo to passengers, and becoming something of an attraction or celebrity.

Smith converted to Catholicism in about 1914, and is buried in the Catholic section of Pine Grove Cemetery in Cass Lake.

The exact age of John Smith at the time of his death has been a subject of controversy. Federal Commissioner of Indian Enrollment Ransom J. Powell argued that "it was disease and not age that made him look the way he did" and remarked that according to records he was 88 years old. Paul Buffalo, who had met Smith when a small boy, said he had repeatedly heard the old man state that he was "seven or eight", "eight or nine" and "ten years old" when the "stars fell" in the Leonid meteor shower of November 13, 1833. Local historian Carl Zapffe writes:

"Birthdates of Indians of the 19th Century had generally been determined by the Government in relation to the awe-inspiring shower of meteorites that burned through the American skies just before dawn on 13 November 1833, scaring the daylights out of civilized and uncivilized peoples alike. Obviously it was the end of the world. . . .".

This estimate tied to the Leonids implies the oldest possible age of John Smith at just under 100 years at the time of his death.
