= Turtle Lake =

Turtle Lake may refer to:

Canada

- Turtle Lake (Temagami), in Ontario
- Turtle Lake (Saskatchewan)
  - Turtle Lake Monster, cryptid that allegedly lives in the lake
- Turtle Lake (Vancouver Island)

Georgia

- Turtle Lake (Tbilisi), or "Kus Tba"

United States

- Turtle Lake (Beltrami County, Minnesota)
- Turtle Lake (Cass County, Minnesota)
- Turtle Lake (Douglas County, Minnesota)
- Turtle Lake (Grant County, Minnesota)
- Turtle Lake (Polk County, Minnesota)
- Turtle Lake Township, Beltrami County, Minnesota
- Turtle Lake Township, Cass County, Minnesota
- Turtle Lake, Shoreview, Minnesota
  - Turtle Lake Elementary School, Shoreview, Minnesota
- Turtle Lake, Montana
- Turtle Lake, North Dakota
- Turtle Lake, Wisconsin, a village
- Turtle Lake, Barron County, Wisconsin, a town
- Turtle Lake, Walworth County, Wisconsin, a CDP

Vietnam

- Turtle Lake (Ho Chi Minh City)
