= Oshawa (disambiguation) =

Oshawa is a city in Ontario, Canada.

Oshawa may also refer to:

- Oshawa, Cass County, Minnesota
- Oshawa, Nicollet County, Minnesota
- Oshawa Township, Nicollet County, Minnesota
- Oshawa (federal electoral district)
- Oshawa (provincial electoral district)
