= Minnesota State Highway 64 =

State highway in Minnesota, United States

Trunk Highway 64
- MN 64 highlighted in red

Route information
- Maintained by MnDOT
- Length: 64.817 mi (104.313 km)
- Existed: 1933–present

Major junctions
- South end: MN 210 near Motley
- MN 87 at Badoura Township; MN 34 at Akeley
- North end: MN 200 in Hendrickson Township, near Laporte

Location
- Country: United States
- State: Minnesota
- Counties: Cass, Hubbard

Highway system
- Minnesota Trunk Highway System; Interstate; US; State; Legislative; Scenic
← US 63	→ US 65

Minnesota State Highway 64 (MN 64) is a 64.817-mile-long (104.313 km) highway in north-central Minnesota, which runs from its intersection with State Highway 210 in Motley and continues north to its northern terminus at its intersection with State Highway 200 near Laporte and Kabekona.

Determined as an important alternate route to congestion-plagued Highway 371, this road has been designated a Minnesota Regional Corridor along its entire length.

== Route description ==
State Highway 64 serves as a north–south route in north-central Minnesota between Motley, Akeley, and Hendrickson Township.

Highway 64 passes through the following forests:

- Foot Hills State Forest in Cass County
- Badoura State Forest in southeast Hubbard County
- Paul Bunyan State Forest in Hubbard County

This route is often used by motorists as a shortcut between Bemidji and the Twin Cities to avoid congestion on nearby Highway 371. Highway 64 parallels Highway 371.

U.S. Highway 10 is four blocks from the southern terminus of Highway 64 in Motley at State Highway 210.

== History ==
Highway 64 was authorized between Motley and Akeley in 1933. The part of the route from Akeley to State Highway 200 was authorized in 1949, but not constructed until the mid-1960s.

Highway 64 was still a primitive road in 1940. The original section was completely paved by the late 1950s. The section of the route between Akeley and Highway 200 was built as a new road by 1965.

Highway 64 was reconstructed in 1998 between its junctions with State Highway 87. A sharp 90 degree turn along this stretch was smoothed out, and the road widened through a swampy area that had steep dropoffs on either side leading to water-filled ditches.

== Major intersections ==
County	Location	mi	km	Destinations	Notes
Cass	May Township	0.000	0.000	MN 210 – Brainerd, Motley	Southern terminus
Cass	Byron Township	10.950	17.622	CSAH 30 west	
Cass	Poplar Township	18.187	29.269	CSAH 24 east (62nd Street)	
Cass	Poplar Township	18.685	30.071	CSAH 23 west (60th Street SW)	
Cass	Ansel Township	25.279	40.683	CSAH 20 west – Nimrod, Sebeka	
Cass	Ansel–McKinley township line	27.784	44.714	CSAH 2 east (24th Street SW) – Pine River	
Cass	McKinley Township	30.833	49.621	CSAH 19 west (12th Street)	
Cass	McKinley Township	33.839	54.459	MN 87 east – Backus	South end of MN 87 overlap
Hubbard	Badoura Township	38.737	62.341	MN 87 west – US 71	North end of MN 87 overlap
Hubbard	White Oak Township	44.753	72.023	CSAH 33 west – Nevis	
Hubbard	Akeley	48.312	77.751	CSAH 12 east	
Hubbard	Akeley	48.702	78.378	MN 34 west – Park Rapids	West end of MN 34 overlap
Hubbard	Akeley	49.306	79.350	MN 34 east – Walker	East end of MN 34 overlap
Hubbard	Hendrickson Township	64.889	104.429	MN 200 – Bemidji, Laporte	Northern terminus
1.000 mi = 1.609 km; 1.000 km = 0.621 mi: Concurrency terminus
