= Bull Moose Township, Cass County, Minnesota =

Bull Moose Township, Minnesota
- Township
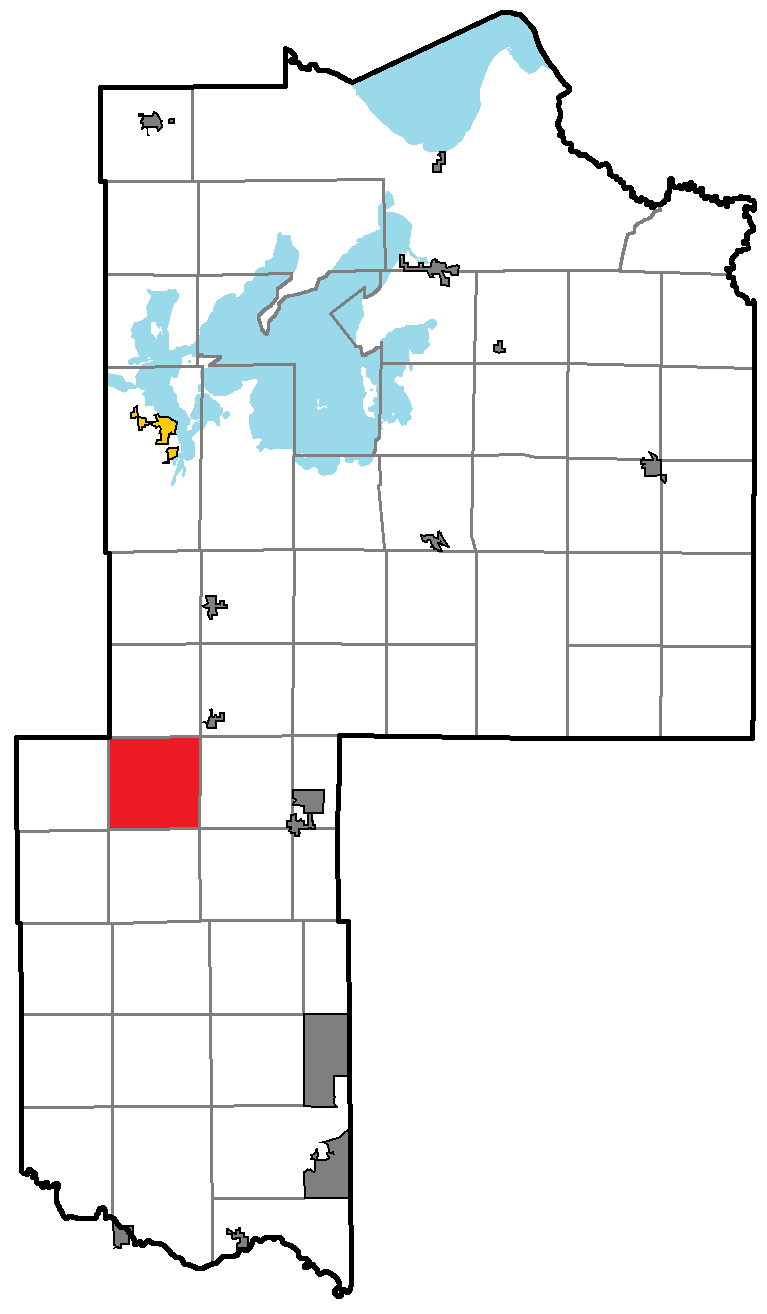
- Location of Bull Moose Township, within Cass County, Minnesota
- Coordinates: 46°45′20″N 94°34′55″W
- Country: United States
- State: Minnesota
- County: Cass

Area
  - Total: 36.0 sq mi (93.2 km^{2})
  - Land: 34.3 sq mi (88.8 km^{2})
  - Water: 1.7 sq mi (4.3 km^{2})
- Elevation: 1,404 ft (428 m)

Population (2020)
  - Total: 145
  - Density: 4.23/sq mi (1.63/km^{2})
- Time zone: UTC-6 (Central (CST))
  - Summer (DST): UTC-5 (CDT)
- FIPS code: 27-08560
- GNIS feature ID: 0663701

Bull Moose Township is a township in Cass County, Minnesota, United States. The population was 145 as of the 2020 census. This township was named after the Bull Moose Party.

== Geography ==
According to the United States Census Bureau, the township has a total area of 36.0 square miles (93 km^{2}), of which 34.3 square miles (89 km^{2}) is land and 1.7 square miles (4.4 km^{2}) (4.64%) is water.

=== Unincorporated communities ===
- Oshawa

=== Major highway ===
- Minnesota State Highway 87

=== Lakes ===
- Abel Lake
- Bergkeller Lake (east quarter)
- Cedar Lake
- Cut Lake
- Deer Lake
- Goose Lake (east three-quarters)
- Scribner Lake

=== Adjacent townships ===
- Deerfield Township (north)
- Powers Township (northeast)
- Pine River Township (east)
- Walden Township (southeast)
- Bungo Township (south)
- Ansel Township (southwest)
- McKinley Township (west)
- Badoura Township, Hubbard County (northwest)

== Demographics ==
As of the census of 2000, there were 107 people, 38 households, and 31 families residing in the township. The population density was 3.1 inhabitants per square mile (1.2/km^{2}). There were 54 housing units at an average density of 1.6 per square mile (0.62/km^{2}). The racial makeup of the township was 100.00% White.

There were 38 households, out of which 39.5% had children under the age of 18 living with them, 73.7% were married couples living together, 2.6% had a female householder with no husband present, and 15.8% were non-families. 13.2% of all households were made up of individuals, and 5.3% had someone living alone who was 65 years of age or older. The average household size was 2.82 and the average family size was 3.00.

In the township the population was spread out, with 30.8% under the age of 18, 10.3% from 18 to 24, 24.3% from 25 to 44, 23.4% from 45 to 64, and 11.2% who were 65 years of age or older. The median age was 34 years. For every 100 females, there were 105.8 males. For every 100 females age 18 and over, there were 111.4 males.

The median income for a household in the township was $31,563, and the median income for a family was $41,250. Males had a median income of $16,250 versus $13,250 for females. The per capita income for the township was $12,596. There were 7.7% of families and 9.8% of the population living below the poverty line, including no under eighteens and 23.1% of those over 64.
