= Pine River Township, Cass County, Minnesota =

Pine River Township, Minnesota
- Township
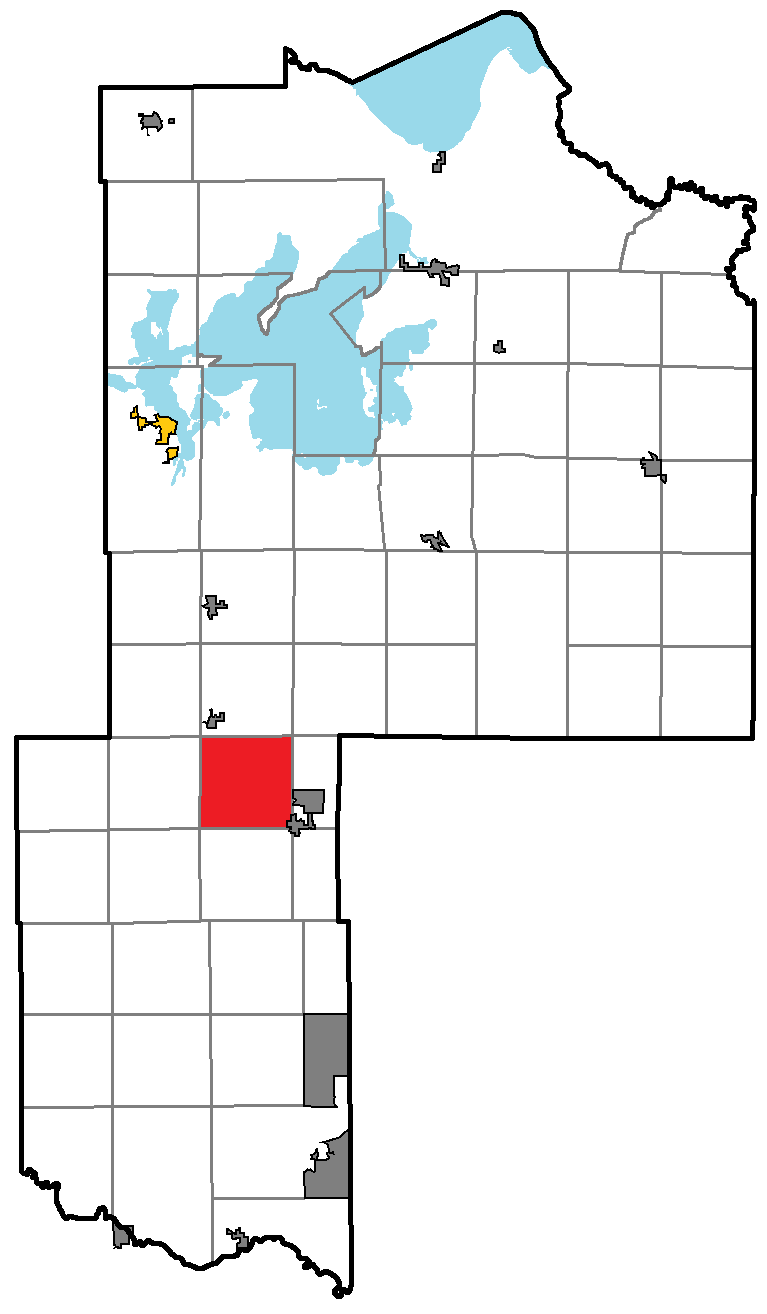
- Location of Pine River Township, within Cass County, Minnesota
- Coordinates: 46°45′17″N 94°27′58″W
- Country: United States
- State: Minnesota
- County: Cass

Area
  - Total: 36.0 sq mi (93.2 km^{2})
  - Land: 34.9 sq mi (90.3 km^{2})
  - Water: 1.1 sq mi (2.9 km^{2})
- Elevation: 1,316 ft (401 m)

Population (2020)
  - Total: 1,186
  - Density: 34.0/sq mi (13.1/km^{2})
- Time zone: UTC-6 (Central (CST))
  - Summer (DST): UTC-5 (CDT)
- ZIP code: 56474
- Area code: 218
- FIPS code: 27-51298
- GNIS feature ID: 0665311

Pine River Township is a township in Cass County, Minnesota, United States. The population was 1,186 as of the 2020 census. This township took its name from the Pine River.

== Geography ==
According to the United States Census Bureau, the township has a total area of 36.0 square miles (93.2 km^{2}), of which 34.8 square miles (90.3 km^{2}) is land and 1.1 square miles (2.9 km^{2}) (3.11%) is water.

The west edge of the city of Pine River is located within Pine River Township geographically but is a separate entity.

=== Unincorporated communities ===
- Mildred

=== Major highways ===
- Minnesota State Highway 87
- Minnesota State Highway 371

=== Lakes ===
- Boot Lake
- Bowen Lake (south edge)
- Cow Lake
- Dick Lake
- Eagle Lake
- Horse Lake
- Minnow Lake
- Norway Lake (west edge)
- Pig Lake
- Pine Mountain Lake (southeast edge)
- Rabbit Lake
- Sand Lake
- Tamarack Lake

=== Adjacent townships ===
- Powers Township (north)
- Ponto Lake Township (northeast)
- Barclay Township (east)
- Walden Township (south)
- Bungo Township (southwest)
- Bull Moose Township (west)
- Deerfield Township (northwest)

=== Cemeteries ===
The township contains Pine River Cemetery.

== Demographics ==
As of the census of 2000, there were 1,061 people, 394 households, and 299 families residing in the township. The population density was 30.4 inhabitants per square mile (11.7/km^{2}). There were 469 housing units at an average density of 13.5/sq mi (5.2/km^{2}). The racial makeup of the township was 97.83% White, 0.09% African American, 0.75% Native American, 0.47% Asian, 0.09% Pacific Islander, and 0.75% from two or more races. Hispanic or Latino of any race were 0.38% of the population.

There were 394 households, out of which 36.0% had children under the age of 18 living with them, 64.5% were married couples living together, 6.6% had a female householder with no husband present, and 23.9% were non-families. 20.6% of all households were made up of individuals, and 8.1% had someone living alone who was 65 years of age or older. The average household size was 2.69 and the average family size was 3.10.

In the township the population was spread out, with 29.0% under the age of 18, 8.2% from 18 to 24, 25.8% from 25 to 44, 22.7% from 45 to 64, and 14.2% who were 65 years of age or older. The median age was 38 years. For every 100 females, there were 102.5 males. For every 100 females age 18 and over, there were 98.7 males.

The median income for a household in the township was $37,212, and the median income for a family was $45,455. Males had a median income of $29,135 versus $22,125 for females. The per capita income for the township was $14,910. About 5.6% of families and 9.4% of the population were below the poverty line, including 11.4% of those under age 18 and 10.2% of those age 65 or over.
