= McKinley Township, Cass County, Minnesota =

McKinley Township, Minnesota
- Township
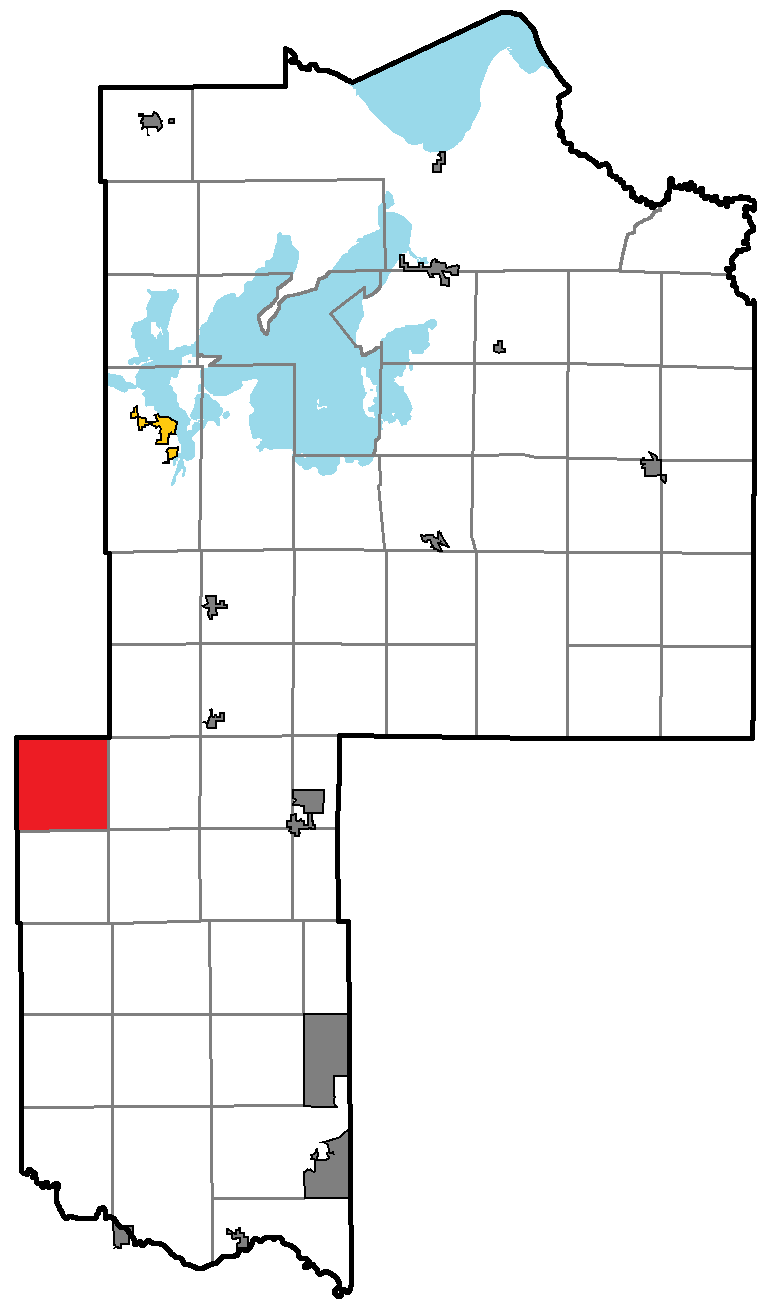
- Location of McKinley Township, within Cass County, Minnesota
- Coordinates: 46°45′10″N 94°42′47″W
- Country: United States
- State: Minnesota
- County: Cass

Area
  - Total: 36.3 sq mi (94.1 km^{2})
  - Land: 36.1 sq mi (93.4 km^{2})
  - Water: 0.27 sq mi (0.7 km^{2})
- Elevation: 1,410 ft (430 m)

Population (2020)
  - Total: 140
  - Density: 3.9/sq mi (1.5/km^{2})
- Time zone: UTC-6 (Central (CST))
  - Summer (DST): UTC-5 (CDT)
- FIPS code: 27-39104
- GNIS feature ID: 0664862

McKinley Township is a township in Cass County, Minnesota, United States. The population was 140 at the 2020 census. McKinley Township was named for William McKinley, 25th President of the United States.

== Geography ==
According to the United States Census Bureau, the township has a total area of 36.3 square miles (94.1 km^{2}), of which 36.1 square miles (93.4 km^{2}) is land and 0.3 square mile (0.7 km^{2}) (0.74%) is water.

=== Major highways ===
- Minnesota State Highway 64
- Minnesota State Highway 87

=== Lakes ===
- Bergkeller Lake (west three-quarters)
- Goose Lake (west quarter)
- Spot Lake

=== Adjacent townships ===
- Badoura Township, Hubbard County (north)
- Deerfield Township (northeast)
- Bull Moose Township (east)
- Bungo Township (southeast)
- Ansel Township (south)
- Orton Township, Wadena County (southwest)
- Huntersville Township, Wadena County (west)
- Crow Wing Lake Township, Hubbard County (northwest)

== Demographics ==
As of the census of 2000, there were 130 people, 47 households, and 33 families residing in the township. The population density was 3.6 inhabitants per square mile (1.4/km^{2}). There were 75 housing units at an average density of 2.1 per square mile (0.81/km^{2}). The racial makeup of the township was 96.15% White, 0.00% African American, 3.85% Native American, 0.00% Asian, 0.00% Pacific Islander, 0.00% from other races, and 0.00% from two or more races. 0.77% of the population were Hispanic or Latino of any race.

There were 47 households, out of which 36.2% had children under the age of 18 living with them, 66.0% were married couples living together, 4.3% had a female householder with no husband present, and 27.7% were non-families. 25.5% of all households were made up of individuals, and 6.4% had someone living alone who was 65 years of age or older. The average household size was 2.77 and the average family size was 3.29.

In the township the population was spread out, with 29.2% under the age of 18, 7.7% from 18 to 24, 18.5% from 25 to 44, 36.2% from 45 to 64, and 8.5% who were 65 years of age or older. The median age was 38 years. For every 100 females, there were 106.3 males. For every 100 females age 18 and over, there were 95.7 males.

The median income for a household in the township was $35,750, and the median income for a family was $35,625. Males had a median income of $18,438 versus $26,250 for females. The per capita income for the township was $11,005. About 18.2% of families and 21.9% of the population were below the poverty line, including 13.5% of those under the age of 18 and none of those 65 and older
