= Camp Ripley Bridge =

- U.S. National Register of Historic Places
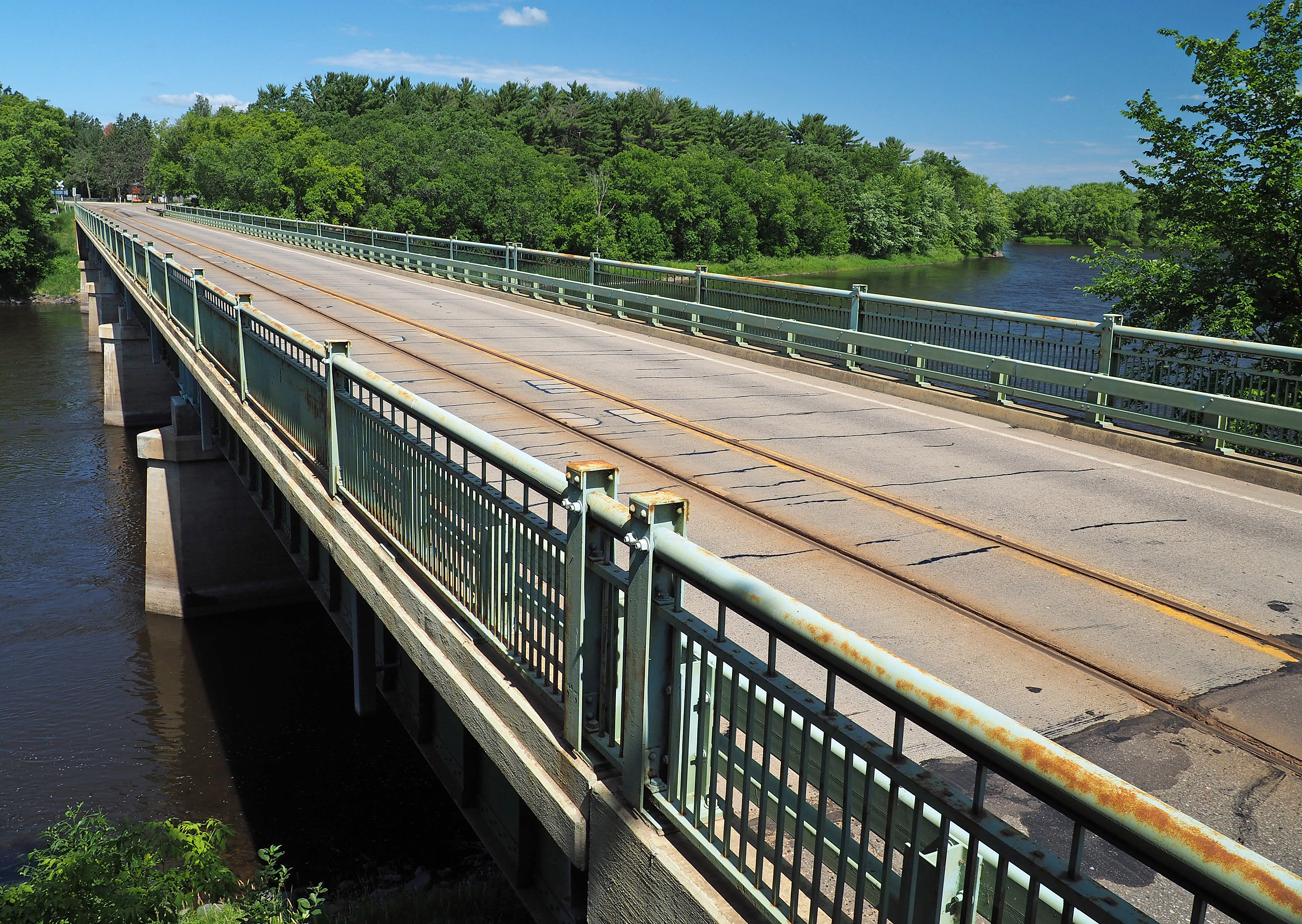
- The Camp Ripley Bridge from the southeast

- Location within Minnesota Location within the United States
- Location: Green Prairie & Ripley Townships, Minnesota
- Nearest city: Little Falls, Minnesota
- Coordinates: 46°4′28″N 94°20′6″W
- Built: 1930
- NRHP reference No.: 14001175
- Designated: January 21, 2015

Camp Ripley Bridge, also known as Bridge 4969, is the only remaining unified road–rail bridge over the Mississippi River. It carries both a railroad spur line and Minnesota State Highway 115 at Camp Ripley in Morrison County.

It was built in 1930 by the Minneapolis Bridge Company to serve as the key transportation connection for Camp Ripley, the state's first and most significant Minnesota National Guard reservation. As Minnesota's only unified road–rail bridge, it was added to the National Register of Historic Places in 2015.

== See also ==
- List of bridges on the National Register of Historic Places in Minnesota
- List of crossings of the Upper Mississippi River
- National Register of Historic Places listings in Morrison County, Minnesota
