= Oshawa, Minnesota =

Oshawa, Minnesota may refer to:

- Oshawa, Cass County, Minnesota
- Oshawa, Nicollet County, Minnesota
