= Birch Lake Township, Cass County, Minnesota =

Birch Lake Township, Minnesota
- Township
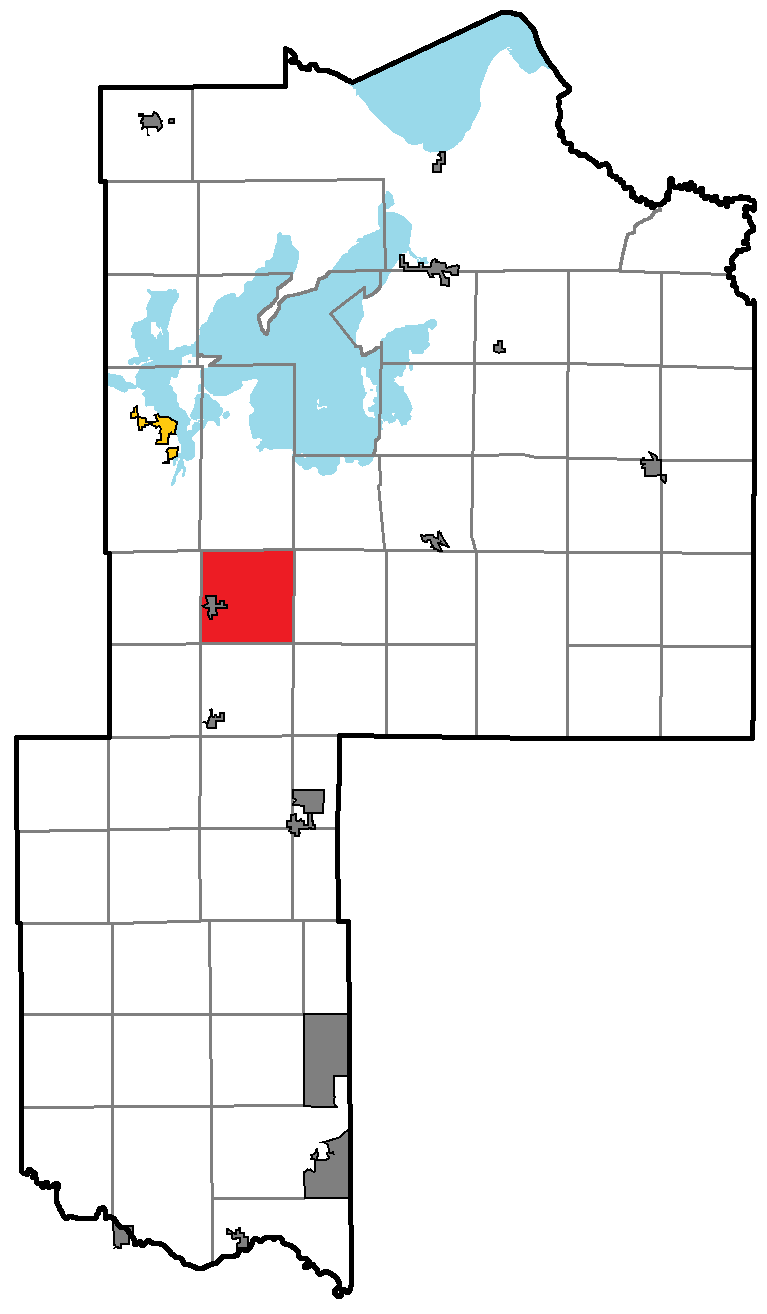
- Location of Birch Lake Township, within Cass County, Minnesota
- Coordinates: 46°55′46″N 94°28′54″W
- Country: United States
- State: Minnesota
- County: Cass

Area
  - Total: 35.4 sq mi (91.6 km^{2})
  - Land: 28.7 sq mi (74.4 km^{2})
  - Water: 6.6 sq mi (17.2 km^{2})
- Elevation: 1,385 ft (422 m)

Population (2020)
  - Total: 576
  - Density: 20.1/sq mi (7.74/km^{2})
- Time zone: UTC-6 (Central (CST))
  - Summer (DST): UTC-5 (CDT)
- FIPS code: 27-06040
- GNIS feature ID: 0663597
- Website: https://www.birchlaketownshipmn.gov/

Birch Lake Township is a township in Cass County, Minnesota, United States. The population was 576 as of the 2020 census. This township took its name from Birch Lake.

== Geography ==
According to the United States Census Bureau, the township has a total area of 35.3 square miles (91 km^{2}), of which 28.7 square miles (74 km^{2}) is land and 6.6 square miles (17 km^{2}) (18.76%) is water.

The city of Hackensack is located entirely within Birch Lake Township geographically but is a separate entity.

=== Major highway ===
- Minnesota State Highway 371

=== Lakes ===
- Birch Lake (east quarter)
- Blind Lake (northwest edge)
- Blueberry Lake
- Boss Lake
- Fish Lake
- Hattfield Lake
- High Bank Lake
- Hiram Lake
- Horseshoe Lake
- Larson Lake
- Little Boy Lake (northwest half)
- Little Webb Lake (vast majority)
- Mud Lake
- Paquet Lake
- Peterson Lake
- Pleasant Lake
- Round Lake (north half)
- Stony Lake
- Surprise Lake
- Sylvester Lake
- Tenmile Lake (east edge)
- Three Island Lake
- Webb Lake (vast majority)
- Woodchuck Lake
- Young Lake

=== Adjacent townships ===
- Turtle Lake Township (north)
- Pine Lake Township (northeast)
- Woodrow Township (east)
- Ponto Lake Township (southeast)
- Powers Township (south)
- Deerfield Township (southwest)
- Hiram Township (west)

=== Cemeteries ===
The township contains the following cemeteries: Finnelly and Hillcrest.

== Demographics ==
As of the census of 2000, there were 573 people, 259 households, and 188 families residing in the township. The population density was 19.9 inhabitants per square mile (7.7/km^{2}). There were 647 housing units at an average density of 22.5 per square mile (8.7/km^{2}). The racial makeup of the township was 98.43% White, and 1.57% from two or more races.

There were 259 households, out of which 17.0% had children under the age of 18 living with them, 69.9% were married couples living together, 2.3% had a female householder with no husband present, and 27.4% were non-families. 24.7% of all households were made up of individuals, and 7.7% had someone living alone who was 65 years of age or older. The average household size was 2.21 and the average family size was 2.61.

In the township the population was spread out, with 17.1% under the age of 18, 4.0% from 18 to 24, 15.7% from 25 to 44, 38.7% from 45 to 64, and 24.4% who were 65 years of age or older. The median age was 53 years. For every 100 females, there were 105.4 males. For every 100 females age 18 and over, there were 109.3 males.

The median income for a household in the township was $36,042, and the median income for a family was $39,327. Males had a median income of $31,500 versus $26,875 for females. The per capita income for the township was $18,687. About 2.8% of families and 5.4% of the population were below the poverty line, including 13.1% of those under age 18 and 1.5% of those age 65 or over.
