= Ansel Township, Cass County, Minnesota =

Ansel Township, Minnesota
- Township
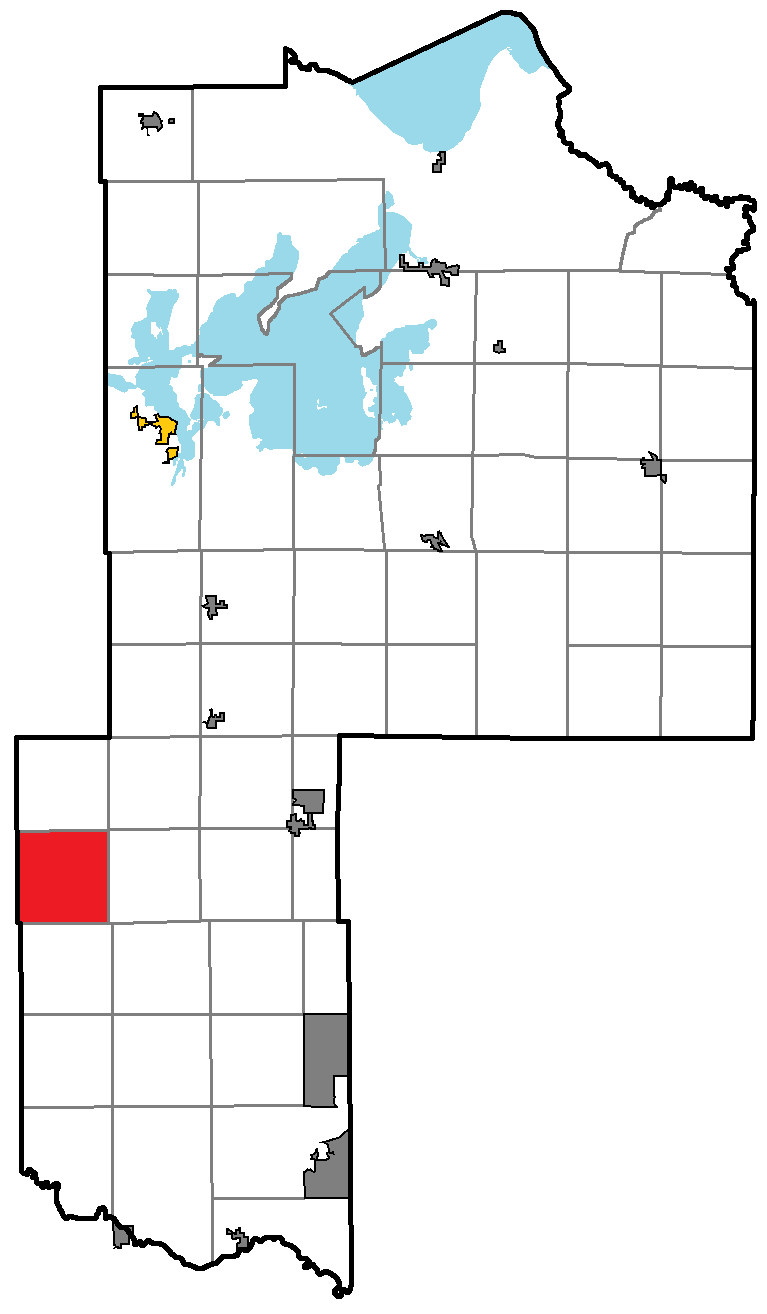
- Location of Ansel Township, within Cass County, Minnesota
- Coordinates: 46°40′37″N 94°43′49″W
- Country: United States
- State: Minnesota
- County: Cass

Area
  - Total: 35.8 sq mi (92.6 km^{2})
  - Land: 35.3 sq mi (91.5 km^{2})
  - Water: 0.42 sq mi (1.1 km^{2})
- Elevation: 1,381 ft (421 m)

Population (2020)
  - Total: 76
  - Density: 2.2/sq mi (0.83/km^{2})
- Time zone: UTC-6 (Central (CST))
  - Summer (DST): UTC-5 (CDT)
- FIPS code: 27-01738
- GNIS feature ID: 0663441

Ansel Township (/ˈænsəl/ AN-səl) is a township in Cass County, Minnesota, United States. As of the 2020 census, its population was 76. Ansel was the given name of a pioneer settler.

== Geography ==
According to the United States Census Bureau, Ansel Township covers an area of 35.74 square miles (92.56 square kilometers); of this, 0.43 square miles (1.11 square kilometers) or 1.2 percent is water.

=== Adjacent townships ===
- McKinley Township (north)
- Bull Moose Township (northeast)
- Bungo Township (east)
- Poplar Township (south)
- Lyons Township, Wadena County (southwest)
- Orton Township, Wadena County (west)
- Huntersville Township, Wadena County (northwest)

=== Major highway ===
- Minnesota State Highway 64

=== Lakes ===
- Spider Lake (vast majority)

== School districts ==
- Pine River–Backus
- Staples–Motley

== Political districts ==
- Minnesota's 8th congressional district
- State House District 04b
- State Senate District 04

== Demographics ==
As of the census of 2000, there were 101 people, 33 households, and 29 families residing in the township. The population density was 2.9 inhabitants per square mile (1.1/km^{2}). There were 38 housing units at an average density of 1.1 per square mile (0.42/km^{2}). The racial makeup of the township was 99.01% White, and 0.99% from two or more races.

There were 33 households, out of which 39.4% had children under the age of 18 living with them, 84.8% were married couples living together, and 9.1% were non-families. 9.1% of all households were made up of individuals, and none had someone living alone who was 65 years of age or older. The average household size was 3.06 and the average family size was 3.27.

In the township the population was spread out, with 28.7% under the age of 18, 6.9% from 18 to 24, 23.8% from 25 to 44, 27.7% from 45 to 64, and 12.9% who were 65 years of age or older. The median age was 40 years. For every 100 females, there were 98.0 males. For every 100 females age 18 and over, there were 111.8 males.

The median income for a household in the township was $40,000, and the median income for a family was $40,000. Males had a median income of $20,625 versus $16,250 for females. The per capita income for the township was $14,102. There were 13.9% of families and 13.8% of the population living below the poverty line, including 23.3% of under eighteens and none of those over 64.
