= Minnesota State Highway 115 =

State highway in Minnesota, United States

Trunk Highway 115
- MN 115 highlighted in red

Route information
- Maintained by MnDOT
- Length: 8.736 mi (14.059 km)
- Existed: April 22, 1933–present
- Tourist routes: Great River Road

Major junctions
- West end: US 10 at Randall
- CR 13 at Green Prairie Township
- East end: MN 371 at Camp Ripley Junction in Ripley Township

Location
- Country: United States
- State: Minnesota
- Counties: Morrison

Highway system
- Minnesota Trunk Highway System; Interstate; US; State; Legislative; Scenic
← MN 114	→ MN 117

Minnesota State Highway 115 (MN 115) is a 8.736-mile-long (14.059 km) state highway in Central Minnesota, which runs from its intersection with U.S. Highway 10 (US 10) in Randall and continues east to its eastern terminus at its interchange with MN 371 at Camp Ripley Junction in Ripley Township near the city of Little Falls.

== Route description ==
MN 115 serves as an east–west route in central Minnesota between the communities of Randall, Camp Ripley, and Ripley Township.

The route passes by the entrance of, and therefore serves, the Camp Ripley Military Reservation; north of the city of Little Falls. A portion of MN 115 serves as the southern border for Camp Ripley.

MN 115 crosses the Mississippi River near its junction with MN 371. The bridge also carries a railway line on the same surface as the road deck; this is the only remaining bridge over the Mississippi configured in this way.

The route is legally defined as Route 131 in the Minnesota Statutes. It is not marked with this number.

== History ==
MN 115 was authorized on April 22, 1933.

The route was paved by 1942.

The Camp Ripley Bridge carries both the highway and the railroad spur to Camp Ripley over the Mississippi River. It was built in 1930 and rebuilt in 1998.

Before nearby MN 371 was rebuilt as a four-lane freeway on its new alignment between the city of Little Falls to just north of Camp Ripley Junction, the eastern terminus of MN 115 at MN 371 was previously a three-way Y-intersection intermixed with railroad tracks. With construction on the new MN 371 completed in the early 2000s, MN 115 now ends at an interchange with MN 371, with the roadway continuing eastbound as County Road 47 (CR 47), which was re-aligned to connect to the new interchange. The old routing of MN 371 in the immediate area has been turned-back to county maintenance as CR 76. This old portion of MN 371, including the former Y-intersection with MN 115, has been reconstructed as a frontage road.

== Major intersections ==
The entire route is in Morrison County.

Location	mi	km	Destinations	Notes
Randall	0.000	0.000	US 10 – Little Falls, Motley	Western terminus
Green Prairie Township	8.142	13.103	CR 213 / Great River Road (National Route) – Camp Ripley	Western end of Great River Road concurrency
Mississippi River	8.743– 8.821	14.070– 14.196	MN 115 Bridge	
Ripley Township	9.156	14.735	MN 371 / Great River Road (National Route) CSAH 47 east	Eastern terminus; diamond interchange
1.000 mi = 1.609 km; 1.000 km = 0.621 mi: Concurrency terminus
