= Turtle Lake Township, Minnesota =

Turtle Lake Township is the name of some places in the U.S. state of Minnesota:

- Turtle Lake Township, Beltrami County, Minnesota
- Turtle Lake Township, Cass County, Minnesota
