= Mildred, Minnesota =

Unincorporated community in Minnesota, US

Mildred
- Unincorporated community
- Location within Minnesota Location within the United States
- Coordinates: 46°45′18″N 94°27′53″W
- Country: United States
- State: Minnesota
- County: Cass
- Township: Pine River Township
- Elevation: 1,342 ft (409 m)
- Time zone: UTC-6 (Central (CST))
  - Summer (DST): UTC-5 (CDT)
- ZIP code: 56435
- Area code: 218
- GNIS feature ID: 657393

Mildred is an unincorporated community in Pine River Township, Cass County, Minnesota, United States, near Pine River and Backus.

A post office was established at Mildred in 1899, and remained in operation until it was discontinued in 1954. The community was named for its first postmaster, Mrs. Mildred Schofield.
