= Powers Township, Cass County, Minnesota =

Powers Township, Minnesota
- Township
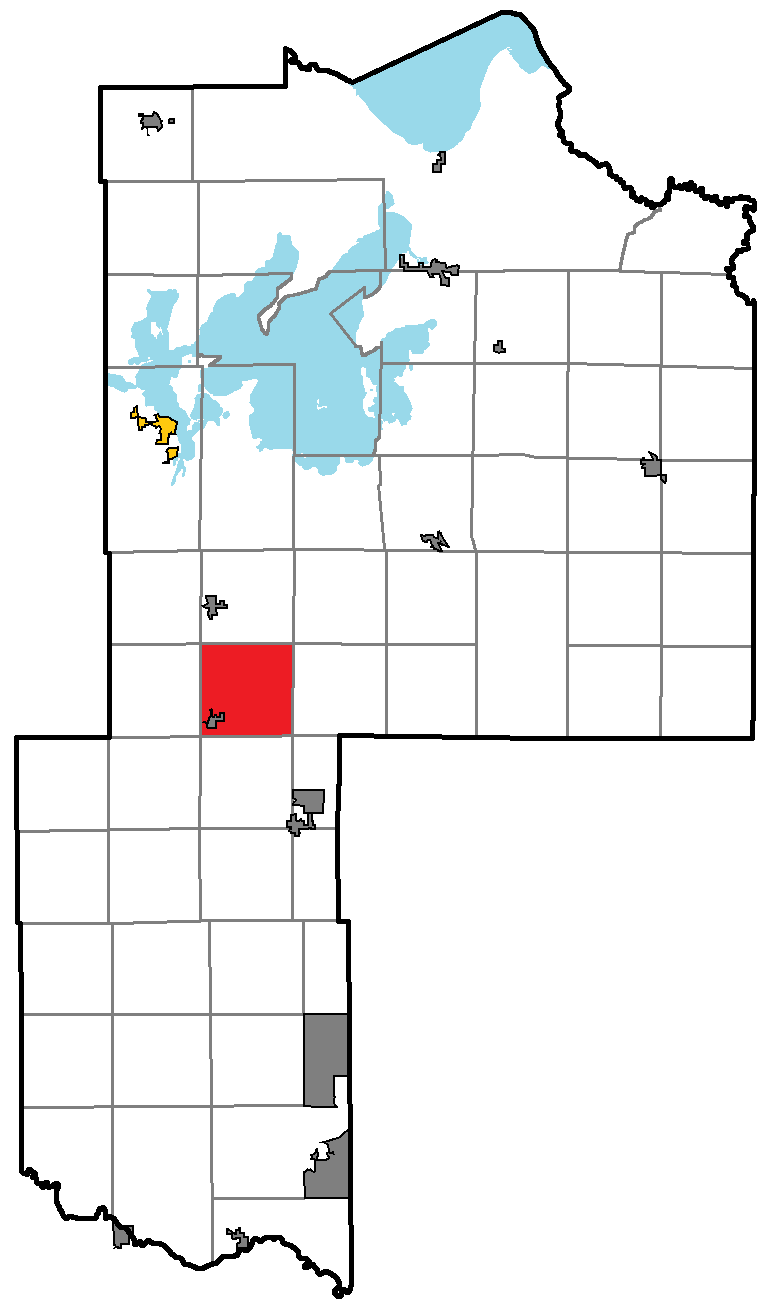
- Location of Powers Township, within Cass County, Minnesota
- Coordinates: 46°50′55″N 94°28′15″W
- Country: United States
- State: Minnesota
- County: Cass

Area
  - Total: 35.3 sq mi (91.5 km^{2})
  - Land: 28.7 sq mi (74.3 km^{2})
  - Water: 6.6 sq mi (17.2 km^{2})
- Elevation: 1,329 ft (405 m)

Population (2020)
  - Total: 811
  - Density: 28.3/sq mi (10.9/km^{2})
- Time zone: UTC-6 (Central (CST))
  - Summer (DST): UTC-5 (CDT)
- FIPS code: 27-52252
- GNIS feature ID: 0665348
- Website: https://www.powerstownship.com/

Powers Township is a township in Cass County, Minnesota, United States. The population was 811 at the 2020 census. Powers Township was named for Gorham Powers, a Minnesota politician who owned land there.

== Geography ==
According to the United States Census Bureau, the township has a total area of 35.3 square miles (91.5 km^{2}), of which 28.7 square miles (74.3 km^{2}) is land and 6.7 square miles (17.2 km^{2}) (18.83%) is water.

The city of Backus is located entirely within Powers Township geographically but is a separate entity.

=== Major highways ===
- Minnesota State Highway 87
- Minnesota State Highway 371

=== Lakes ===
- Bass Lake
- Beuber Lake
- Big Portage Lake
- Blind Lake (southwest half)
- Bowen Lake (vast majority)
- Brookway Lake
- Crooked Lake
- Fawn Lake
- Four Point Lake
- Horseshoe Lake
- Island Lake
- Johnson Lake
- Lindsey Lake
- Little Boy Lake (southwest half)
- Loon Lake
- Mud Lake (west three-quarters)
- Ox Yoke Lake
- Pickerel Lake
- Pine Mountain Lake (east half)
- Rainy Lake
- Rice Portage Lake (west half)
- Round Lake (southwest half)
- Sanborn Lake
- Swede Lake
- Tamarack Lake
- Twin Lakes
- Willard Lake

=== Adjacent townships ===
- Birch Lake Township (north)
- Woodrow Township (northeast)
- Ponto Lake Township (east)
- Barclay Township (southeast)
- Pine River Township (south)
- Bull Moose Township (southwest)
- Deerfield Township (west)
- Hiram Township (northwest)

=== Cemeteries ===
The township contains Evergreen Cemetery.

== Demographics ==
At the 2000 census, there were 918 people, 340 households and 239 families residing in the township. The population density was 32.0 inhabitants per square mile (12.4/km^{2}). There were 800 housing units at an average density of 27.9 per square mile (10.8/km^{2}). The racial makeup of the township was 98.04% White, 0.11% African American, 1.42% Native American, 0.11% from other races, and 0.33% from two or more races.

There were 340 households, of which 24.7% had children under the age of 18 living with them, 58.8% were married couples living together, 6.8% had a female householder with no husband present, and 29.7% were non-families. 24.4% of all households were made up of individuals, and 11.5% had someone living alone who was 65 years of age or older. The average household size was 2.41 and the average family size was 2.81.

Age distribution was 20.3% under the age of 18, 4.7% from 18 to 24, 19.2% from 25 to 44, 28.0% from 45 to 64, and 27.9% who were 65 years of age or older. The median age was 49 years. For every 100 females, there were 93.3 males. For every 100 females age 18 and over, there were 88.7 males.

The median household income was $40,547, and the median family income was $44,028. Males had a median income of $28,250 versus $21,125 for females. The per capita income for the township was $16,140. About 6.6% of families and 13.6% of the population were below the poverty line, including 12.1% of those under age 18 and 24.9% of those age 65 or over.
