= Oshawa, Cass County, Minnesota =

Unincorporated community in Minnesota, US

Oshawa
- Unincorporated community
- Location within Minnesota Location within the United States
- Coordinates: 46°48′14″N 94°38′20″W
- Country: United States
- State: Minnesota
- County: Cass
- Township: Bull Moose Township and Deerfield Township
- Elevation: 1,483 ft (452 m)
- Time zone: UTC-6 (Central (CST))
  - Summer (DST): UTC-5 (CDT)
- ZIP code: 56435
- Area code: 218
- GNIS feature ID: 657687

Oshawa is an unincorporated community in Cass County, Minnesota, United States, near Backus. The community is located near the junction of Cass County Road 41 and State Highway 87 (MN 87). Oshawa is located within Bull Moose Township and Deerfield Township. The Badoura State Forest and the Foot Hills State Forest are both nearby.

A post office was established at Oshawa in 1916, and remained in operation until it was discontinued in 1944.
