= Pontoria, Minnesota =

Unincorporated community in Minnesota, US

Pontoria
- Unincorporated community
- Location within Minnesota Location within the United States
- Coordinates: 46°51′48″N 94°20′12″W
- Country: United States
- State: Minnesota
- County: Cass
- Township: Ponto Lake Township
- Elevation: 1,345 ft (410 m)
- Time zone: UTC-6 (Central (CST))
  - Summer (DST): UTC-5 (CDT)
- ZIP code: 56435 and 56474
- Area code: 218
- GNIS feature ID: 657896

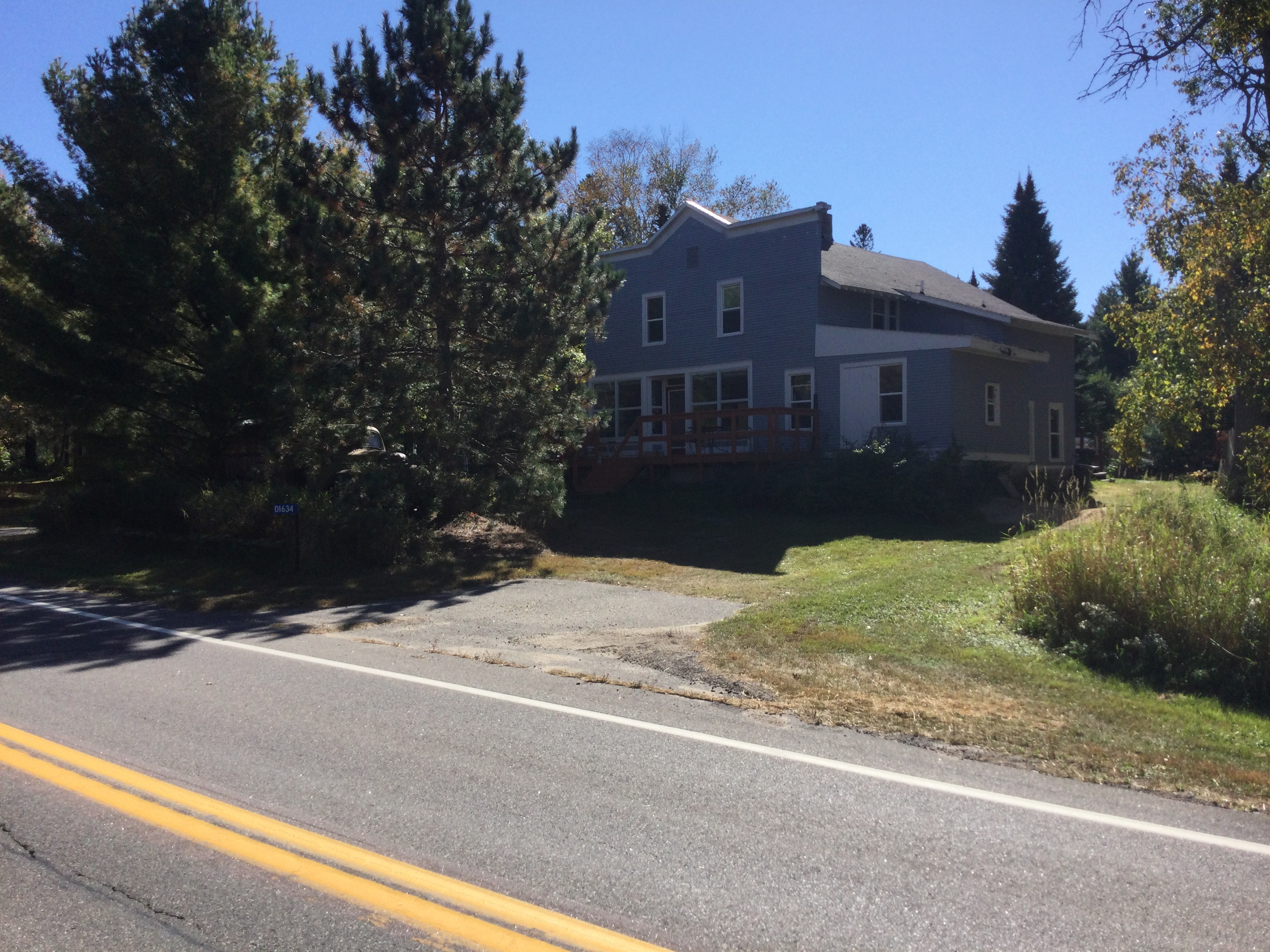

Pontoria is an unincorporated community in Ponto Lake Township, Cass County, Minnesota, United States, near Backus.

The community is located between Pine River and Longville near the junction of State Highways 84 (MN 84) and 87 (MN 87).

Pontoria is located along Highway 84. It is part of the Brainerd Micropolitan Statistical Area.
