= Hiram Township =

Hiram Township may refer to the following townships in the United States:

- Hiram Township, Portage County, Ohio
- Hiram Township, Cass County, Minnesota
