= Onigum, Minnesota =

Unincorporated community in Minnesota, US

Onigum Onigamiinsing (Ojibwe)
- Unincorporated community
- Location within Minnesota Location within the United States
- Coordinates: 47°06′34″N 94°32′41″W
- Country: United States
- State: Minnesota
- County: Cass
- Township: Shingobee Township
- Elevation: 1,322 ft (403 m)
- Time zone: UTC-6 (Central (CST))
  - Summer (DST): UTC-5 (CDT)
- ZIP code: 56484
- Area code: 218
- GNIS feature ID: 657678

Onigum (Ojibwemowin: Onigamiinsing) is an unincorporated community in Shingobee Township, Cass County, Minnesota, United States, near Walker, along Cass County Road 13. The name Onigum (Onigam) means "portage" in the Ojibwe language.

== History ==
In 1781, a large band of Ojibwe had taken control of Leech Lake and were designated by white traders as "Pillagers" or Muk-im-dua-win-in-e-wug (modern spelling Makandwewininiwag, lit. "men who take by force"). They gained a reputation as being a brave band of Ojibwe, Based on the annuity list of 1851, the band numbered about 1250 with approxitimately 300 men who were capable of bearing arms. This number only included the band which made Leech Lake their home.

In 1833, Rev. Boutwell traveled north to Leech Lake to establish a mission. He arrived October 4, 1833 and his first accomplishment was to establish a school. He built a bark house for himself and within a few months he managed to complete a mud-walled cabin to protect himself from the onset of winter. After marriage and the birth of his first child, Boutwell moved back to Wisconsin. Oberlin missionaries followed but were driven away after three years.

On April 12, 1865, President Lincoln assigned Edwin Clark to be agent for the Ojibwe indians of Minnesota as well as Pembina and Turtle Mountains. Clark set out for his new assignment, determined to find a central location for the agency. After a visit to Leech Lake, he observed that it would be the most central and the most accessible point for the Indians and that the Agency should be established on the south shore of Leech Lake. A road was built to the agency and this location served as the contact point for the Indians until 1898.

The Battle of Sugar Point on October 5, 1898, focused national attention on the Agency. After the confrontation and the subsequent negotiations with the Bear Island Pillagers, the agency was moved to a new location on the peninsula about 2 1/2 miles across the water from the Old Agency. The Leech Lake Indian Agency was established by an Act of Congress, approved March 1, 1899, and $15,000 appropriated for constructing the suitable buildings and related work.

The Leech Lake Agency was moved to Cass Lake, Minnesota, in 1922, but the village itself persisted and the Onigum Council was organized and chartered in 1924. In January 1926, Congressman Knutson introduced a bll to set aside 276 acres at Onigum for a village, but it was not passed. He again sponsored a bill in June 1933 to acquire the land occupied by the village as a townsite. In March 1935, the bill finally passed which established a self-governed village at Onigum.
