= Walden Township, Cass County, Minnesota =

Walden Township, Minnesota
- Township
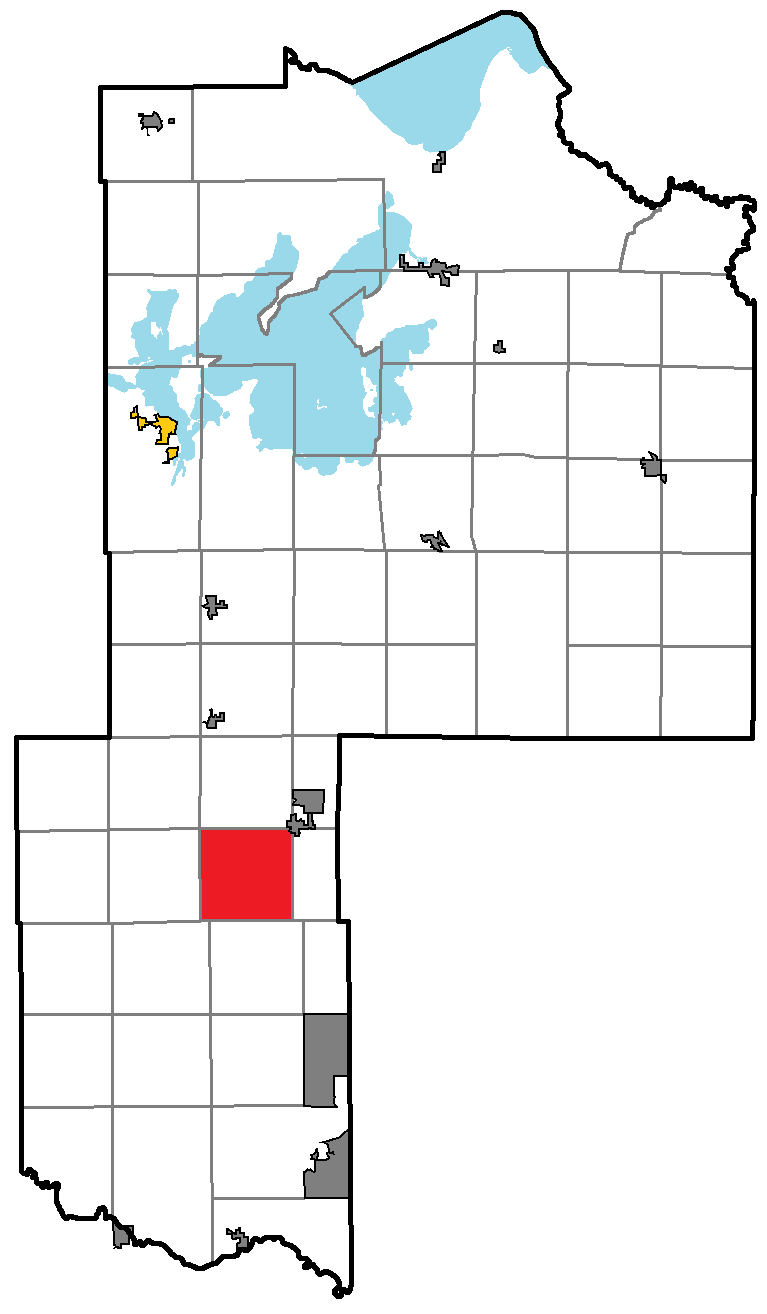
- Location of Walden Township, within Cass County, Minnesota
- Coordinates: 46°40′31″N 94°27′13″W
- Country: United States
- State: Minnesota
- County: Cass

Area
  - Total: 36.2 sq mi (93.7 km^{2})
  - Land: 36.1 sq mi (93.6 km^{2})
  - Water: 0.039 sq mi (0.1 km^{2})
- Elevation: 1,300 ft (400 m)

Population (2020)
  - Total: 539
  - Density: 14.9/sq mi (5.76/km^{2})
- Time zone: UTC-6 (Central (CST))
  - Summer (DST): UTC-5 (CDT)
- ZIP code: 56474
- Area code: 218
- FIPS code: 27-67684
- GNIS feature ID: 0665897

Walden Township is a township in Cass County, Minnesota, United States. The population was 539 as of the 2020 census. Walden Township was named after Walden Pond, in Massachusetts.

== Geography ==
According to the United States Census Bureau, the township has a total area of 36.2 square miles (93.7 km^{2}), of which 36.2 square miles (93.6 km^{2}) is land and 0.04 square miles (0.1 km^{2}) (0.11%) is water.

=== Lakes ===
- Mud Lake
- Rice Lake

=== Adjacent townships ===
- Pine River Township (north)
- Wilson Township (east)
- Maple Township (south)
- Moose Lake Township (southwest)
- Bungo Township (west)
- Bull Moose Township (northwest)

=== Cemeteries ===
The township contains these two cemeteries: Anderson and Maple Hill.

== Demographics ==
As of the census of 2000, there were 405 people, 143 households, and 108 families residing in the township. The population density was 11.2 people per square mile (4.3/km^{2}). There were 166 housing units at an average density of 4.6/sq mi (1.8/km^{2}). The racial makeup of the township was 99.26% White, 0.25% Native American, 0.25% from other races, and 0.25% from two or more races. Hispanic or Latino of any race were 0.49% of the population.

There were 143 households, out of which 36.4% had children under the age of 18 living with them, 62.9% were married couples living together, 8.4% had a female householder with no husband present, and 23.8% were non-families. 20.3% of all households were made up of individuals, and 7.7% had someone living alone who was 65 years of age or older. The average household size was 2.80 and the average family size was 3.20.

In the township the population was spread out, with 32.1% under the age of 18, 5.7% from 18 to 24, 25.9% from 25 to 44, 23.5% from 45 to 64, and 12.8% who were 65 years of age or older. The median age was 37 years. For every 100 females, there were 97.6 males. For every 100 females age 18 and over, there were 92.3 males.

The median income for a household in the township was $34,063, and the median income for a family was $42,143. Males had a median income of $26,250 versus $16,607 for females. The per capita income for the township was $13,678. About 9.4% of families and 15.8% of the population were below the poverty line, including 21.4% of those under age 18 and 18.2% of those age 65 or over.
