= Ponto Lake Township, Cass County, Minnesota =

Ponto Lake Township, Minnesota
- Township
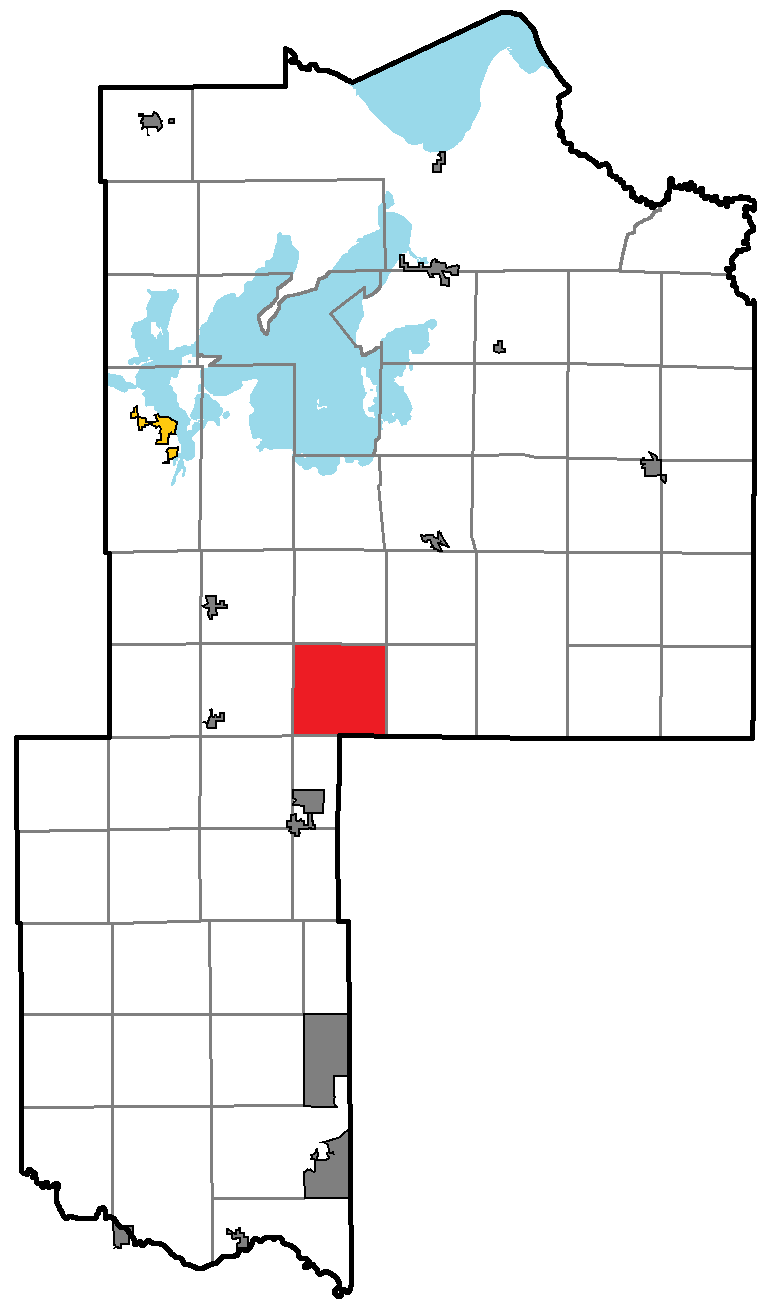
- Location of Ponto Lake Township, within Cass County, Minnesota
- Coordinates: 46°50′43″N 94°20′48″W
- Country: United States
- State: Minnesota
- County: Cass

Area
  - Total: 36.4 sq mi (94.2 km^{2})
  - Land: 29.6 sq mi (76.7 km^{2})
  - Water: 6.8 sq mi (17.5 km^{2})
- Elevation: 1,342 ft (409 m)

Population (2020)
  - Total: 589
  - Density: 19.9/sq mi (7.68/km^{2})
- Time zone: UTC-6 (Central (CST))
  - Summer (DST): UTC-5 (CDT)
- ZIP code: 56474
- Area code: 218
- FIPS code: 27-51928
- GNIS feature ID: 0665336
- Website: https://pontolaketownship.com/

Ponto Lake Township is a township in Cass County, Minnesota, United States. The population was 589 as of the 2020 census. The etymology of the name Ponto is obscure.

== Geography ==
According to the United States Census Bureau, the township has a total area of 36.4 square miles (94.2 km^{2}), of which 29.6 square miles (76.7 km^{2}) is land and 6.8 square miles (17.5 km^{2}) (18.58%) is water.

=== Unincorporated communities ===
- Pontoria

=== Major highways ===
- Minnesota State Highway 84
- Minnesota State Highway 87

=== Lakes ===
- Bass Lake
- Black Portage Lake
- Blind Lake (southeast half)
- Corset Lake
- Deadman Lake
- Deep Portage Lake
- E Twin Lake
- Elbow Lake
- Hand Lake
- Harriet Lake
- Hay Lake (west three-quarters)
- Island Lake (south half)
- Jail Lake
- Little Deep Lake
- Lizzie Lake
- Lake Ada
- Lake Hattie (vast majority)
- Long Lake #2
- Mud Lake (east quarter)
- Mud Portage Lake
- Ponto Lake
- Rice Portage Lake (east half)
- Round Lake
- Rush Lake
- Sand Lake #1
- Sand Lake #2
- Smiley Lake
- Stony Lake
- Sylvan Lake
- Tamarack Lake
- W Twin Lake

=== Adjacent townships ===
- Woodrow Township (north)
- Wabedo Township (northeast)
- Blind Lake Township (east)
- Timothy Township, Crow Wing County (southeast)
- Barclay Township (south)
- Gail Lake Township, Crow Wing County (south)
- Pine River Township (southwest)
- Powers Township (west)
- Birch Lake Township (northwest)

=== Cemeteries ===
The township contains Ponto Lake Cemetery.

== Demographics ==
As of the census of 2000, there were 530 people, 253 households, and 176 families residing in the township. The population density was 17.9 people per square mile (6.9/km^{2}). There were 835 housing units at an average density of 28.2 per square mile (10.9/km^{2}). The racial makeup of the township was 97.55% White, 1.32% Native American, 0.38% Asian, and 0.75% from two or more races. Hispanic or Latino of any race were 0.38% of the population.

There were 253 households, out of which 14.6% had children under the age of 18 living with them, 64.4% were married couples living together, 2.0% had a female householder with no husband present, and 30.4% were non-families. 27.3% of all households were made up of individuals, and 10.7% had someone living alone who was 65 years of age or older. The average household size was 2.09 and the average family size was 2.48.

In the township the population was spread out, with 13.6% under the age of 18, 5.1% from 18 to 24, 14.7% from 25 to 44, 41.7% from 45 to 64, and 24.9% who were 65 years of age or older. The median age was 53 years. For every 100 females, there were 112.0 males. For every 100 females age 18 and over, there were 107.2 males.

The median income for a household in the township was $27,105, and the median income for a family was $31,171. Males had a median income of $31,500 versus $22,188 for females. The per capita income for the township was $17,642. About 6.1% of families and 9.5% of the population were below the poverty line, including 18.2% of those under age 18 and 8.6% of those age 65 or over.
