= Turtle Lake Township, Cass County, Minnesota =

Turtle Lake Township, Minnesota
- Township
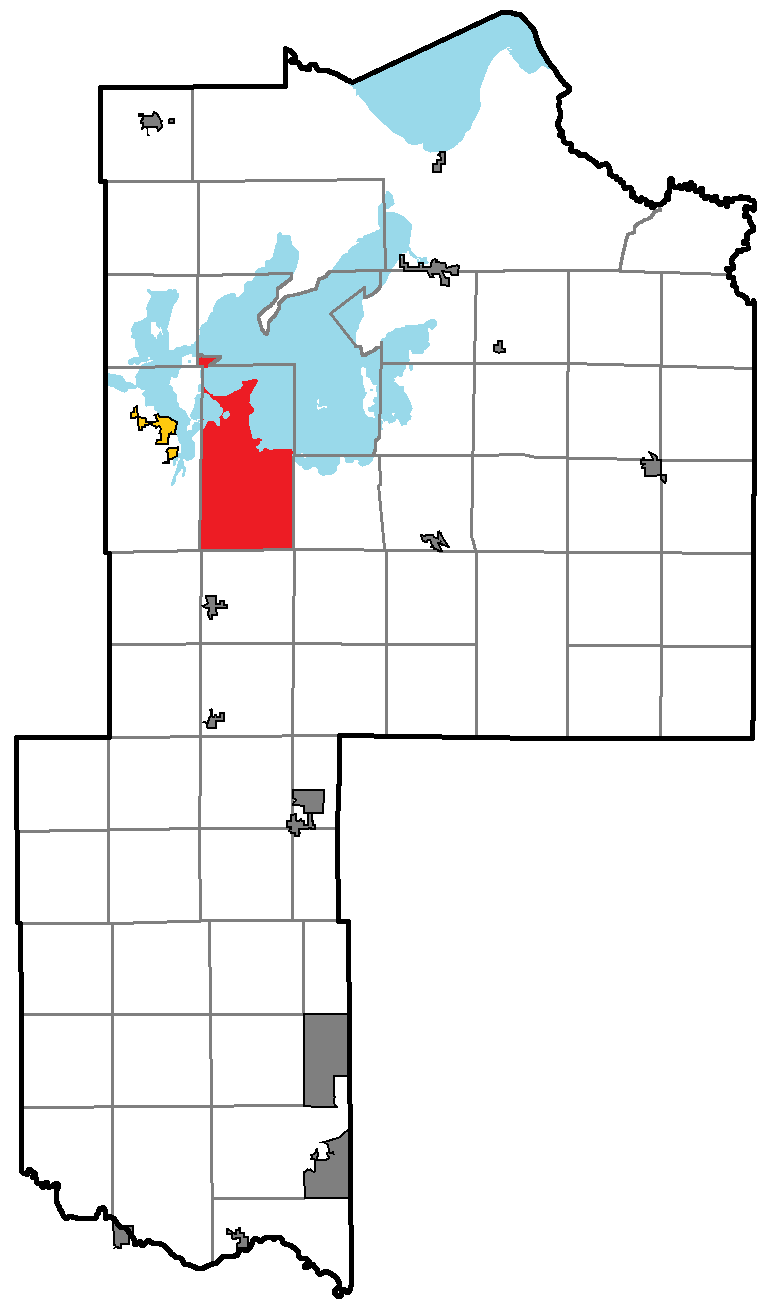
- Location of Turtle Lake, within Cass County, Minnesota
- Coordinates: 47°4′16″N 94°28′59″W
- Country: United States
- State: Minnesota
- County: Cass

Area
  - Total: 72.0 sq mi (186.5 km^{2})
  - Land: 48.7 sq mi (126.1 km^{2})
  - Water: 23.3 sq mi (60.4 km^{2})
- Elevation: 1,309 ft (399 m)

Population (2020)
  - Total: 820
  - Density: 17/sq mi (6.5/km^{2})
- Time zone: UTC-6 (Central (CST))
  - Summer (DST): UTC-5 (CDT)
- ZIP code: 56484
- Area code: 218
- FIPS code: 27-65776
- GNIS feature ID: 0665820
- Website: https://www.turtlelaketwpcassco.gov/

Turtle Lake Township is a township in Cass County, Minnesota, United States. The population was 820 as of the 2020 census. This township took its name from Turtle Lake.

== Geography ==
According to the United States Census Bureau, the township has a total area of 72.0 square miles (186.5 km^{2}), of which 48.7 square miles (126.1 km^{2}) is land and 23.3 square miles (60.4 km^{2}) (32.39%) is water.

=== Unincorporated communities ===
- Baker

=== Major highways ===
- Minnesota State Highway 200
- Minnesota State Highway 371

=== Lakes ===
- Bag Lake
- Big Hanson Lake
- Blue Bill Lake
- Conklin Lake
- Cub Lake
- Deep Lake
- Diamond Lake
- Gould Lake (southeast quarter)
- Hanson Lakes
- Hovde Lake
- Ivins Lake
- Jack Lake
- Leech Lake (southwest quarter)
- Little Turtle Lake
- Little Webb Lake (north edge)
- Lake 418
- Long Lake
- Nomad Lake
- Rice Lake
- Shell Lake
- Spring Lake
- Spruce Lake
- Tanglewood Lake
- Ten Mile Lake (northeast edge)
- Tepee Lake (northwest half)
- Turtle Lake
- Wabegon Lake

=== Adjacent townships ===
- Pine Lake Township (east)
- Birch Lake Township (south)
- Hiram Township (southwest)
- Shingobee Township (west)
- Leech Lake Township (northwest)

=== Cemeteries ===
The township contains these three cemeteries: Hope, Medicine Rite and Saint Agnes.

== Demographics ==
As of the census of 2000, there were 699 people, 271 households, and 211 families residing in the township. The population density was 14.4 people per square mile (5.5/km^{2}). There were 610 housing units at an average density of 12.5/sq mi (4.8/km^{2}). The racial makeup of the township was 65.09% White, 0.29% African American, 30.47% Native American, 0.43% Asian, 0.29% from other races, and 3.43% from two or more races. Hispanic or Latino of any race were 1.29% of the population.

There were 271 households, out of which 29.5% had children under the age of 18 living with them, 59.4% were married couples living together, 12.9% had a female householder with no husband present, and 22.1% were non-families. 15.5% of all households were made up of individuals, and 9.2% had someone living alone who was 65 years of age or older. The average household size was 2.58 and the average family size was 2.83.

In the township the population was spread out, with 26.6% under the age of 18, 5.7% from 18 to 24, 22.7% from 25 to 44, 27.9% from 45 to 64, and 17.0% who were 65 years of age or older. The median age was 41 years. For every 100 females, there were 106.8 males. For every 100 females age 18 and over, there were 98.8 males.

The median income for a household in the township was $38,750, and the median income for a family was $39,219. Males had a median income of $27,404 versus $26,250 for females. The per capita income for the township was $17,049. About 4.5% of families and 8.2% of the population were below the poverty line, including 9.7% of those under age 18 and 6.4% of those age 65 or over.
