= Deerfield Township, Cass County, Minnesota =

Deerfield Township, Minnesota
- Township
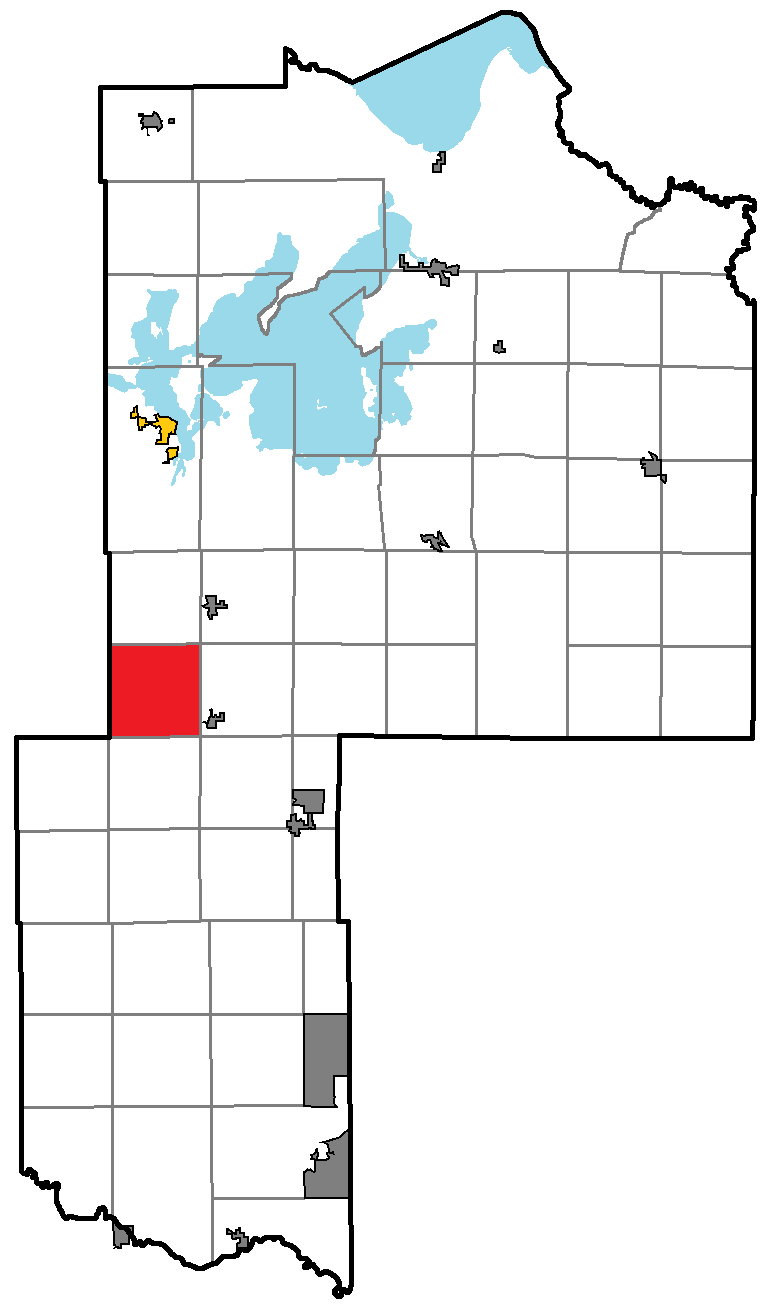
- Location of Deerfield Township, within Cass County, Minnesota
- Coordinates: 46°50′1″N 94°33′49″W
- Country: United States
- State: Minnesota
- County: Cass

Area
  - Total: 35.9 sq mi (93.0 km^{2})
  - Land: 32.4 sq mi (83.9 km^{2})
  - Water: 3.6 sq mi (9.2 km^{2})
- Elevation: 1,483 ft (452 m)

Population (2020)
  - Total: 117
  - Density: 3.61/sq mi (1.39/km^{2})
- Time zone: UTC-6 (Central (CST))
  - Summer (DST): UTC-5 (CDT)
- FIPS code: 27-15220
- GNIS feature ID: 0663943

Deerfield Township is a township in Cass County, Minnesota, United States. The population was 117 as of the 2020 census. Deerfield Township was named for the large population of deer within its borders.

== Geography ==
According to the United States Census Bureau, the township has a total area of 35.9 square miles (93 km^{2}), of which 32.4 square miles (84 km^{2}) is land and 3.5 square miles (9.1 km^{2}) (9.86%) is water.

=== Lakes ===
- Cranberry Lake
- Deer Lake
- Duffy Lake
- First Perch Lake
- First Trestle Lake
- Goose Lake
- Haynes Lake
- Lee Lake
- Long Lake
- North Haynes Lake
- Ox Camp Lake
- Perch Lake
- Pine Mountain Lake (west half)
- Second Perch Lake
- Second Trestle Lake
- Sleepy Island Lake
- Third Perch Lake

=== Adjacent townships ===
- Hiram Township (north)
- Birch Lake Township (northeast)
- Powers Township (east)
- Pine River Township (southeast)
- Bull Moose Township (south)
- McKinley Township (southwest)
- Badoura Township, Hubbard County (west)
- White Oak Township, Hubbard County (northwest)

== Demographics ==
As of the census of 2000, there were 154 people, 53 households, and 41 families residing in the township. The population density was 4.8 inhabitants per square mile (1.9/km^{2}). There were 117 housing units at an average density of 3.6 per square mile (1.4/km^{2}). The racial makeup of the township was 99.35% White and 0.65% Asian.

There were 53 households, out of which 35.8% had children under the age of 18 living with them, 77.4% were married couples living together, 1.9% had a female householder with no husband present, and 20.8% were non-families. 17.0% of all households were made up of individuals, and 9.4% had someone living alone who was 65 years of age or older. The average household size was 2.91 and the average family size was 3.36.

In the township the population was spread out, with 33.1% under the age of 18, 4.5% from 18 to 24, 21.4% from 25 to 44, 24.7% from 45 to 64, and 16.2% who were 65 years of age or older. The median age was 38 years. For every 100 females, there were 105.3 males. For every 100 females age 18 and over, there were 98.1 males.

The median income for a household in the township was $31,944, and the median income for a family was $32,361. Males had a median income of $16,250 versus $19,583 for females. The per capita income for the township was $13,681. About 4.3% of families and 9.4% of the population were below the poverty line, including 18.9% of those under the age of eighteen and 5.3% of those 65 or over.
