= Bungo Township, Cass County, Minnesota =

Bungo Township, Minnesota
- Township
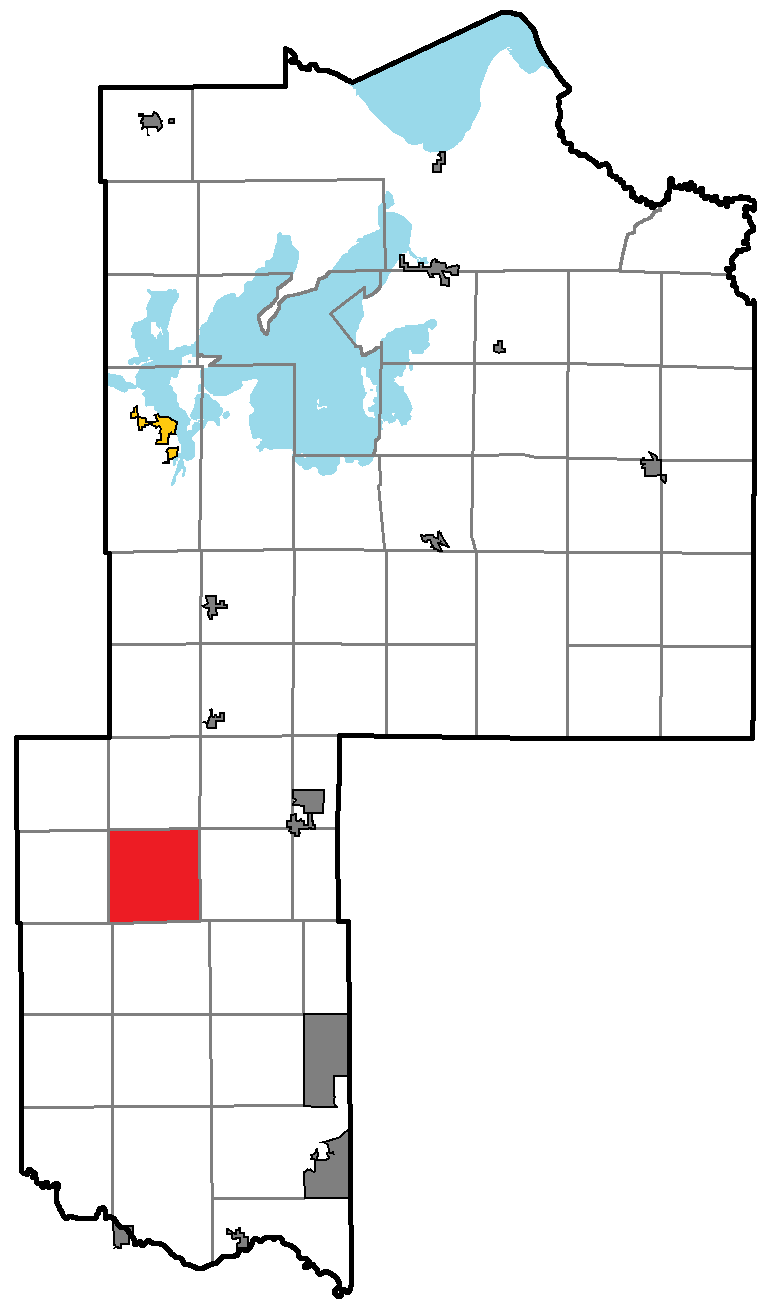
- Location of Bungo Township, within Cass County, Minnesota
- Coordinates: 46°40′22″N 94°34′20″W
- Country: United States
- State: Minnesota
- County: Cass

Area
  - Total: 35.9 sq mi (93.0 km^{2})
  - Land: 34.6 sq mi (89.6 km^{2})
  - Water: 1.3 sq mi (3.4 km^{2})
- Elevation: 1,401 ft (427 m)

Population (2020)
  - Total: 159
  - Density: 4.60/sq mi (1.77/km^{2})
- Time zone: UTC-6 (Central (CST))
  - Summer (DST): UTC-5 (CDT)
- FIPS code: 27-08596
- GNIS feature ID: 0663702

Bungo Township is a township in Cass County, Minnesota, United States. The population was 159 as of the 2020 census. Bungo Township was named for the family of George Bonga.

== Geography ==
According to the United States Census Bureau, the township has a total area of 35.9 square miles (93 km^{2}), of which 34.6 square miles (90 km^{2}) is land and 1.3 square miles (3.4 km^{2}) (3.65%) is water.

=== Lakes ===
- Bass Lake
- Bear Lake
- Clear Lake
- Crane Lake
- Deep Lake
- Duck Lake
- Fish Lake
- Green Lake
- Hazelnut Lake
- Hunter Lake
- Lehman Lake
- Middle Island Lake
- Minnie Lake
- North Island Lake
- Perch Lake
- Pony Lake
- Rob Lake (north edge)
- South Island Lake
- Spider Lake (east edge)
- Taylor Lake

=== Adjacent townships ===
- Bull Moose Township (north)
- Pine River Township (northeast)
- Walden Township (east)
- Moose Lake Township (south)
- Poplar Township (southwest)
- Ansel Township (west)
- McKinley Township (northwest)

== Demographics ==
As of the census of 2000, there were 111 people, 40 households, and 34 families residing in the township. The population density was 3.2 inhabitants per square mile (1.2/km^{2}). There were 48 housing units at an average density of 1.4 per square mile (0.54/km^{2}). The racial makeup of the township was 98.20% White, 0.90% African American, and 0.90% from two or more races.

There were 40 households, out of which 37.5% had children under the age of 18 living with them, 72.5% were married couples living together, 5.0% had a female householder with no husband present, and 15.0% were non-families. 12.5% of all households were made up of individuals, and 2.5% had someone living alone who was 65 years of age or older. The average household size was 2.78 and the average family size was 2.97.

In the township the population was spread out, with 27.9% under the age of 18, 4.5% from 18 to 24, 29.7% from 25 to 44, 27.0% from 45 to 64, and 10.8% who were 65 years of age or older. The median age was 40 years. For every 100 females, there were 109.4 males. For every 100 females age 18 and over, there were 128.6 males.

The median income for a household in the township was $29,375, and the median income for a family was $28,125. Males had a median income of $15,357 versus $15,000 for females. The per capita income for the township was $9,993. There were 29.0% of families and 32.7% of the population living below the poverty line, including 43.8% of under eighteens and none of those over 64.
