= Hiram Township, Cass County, Minnesota =

Hiram Township, Minnesota
- Township
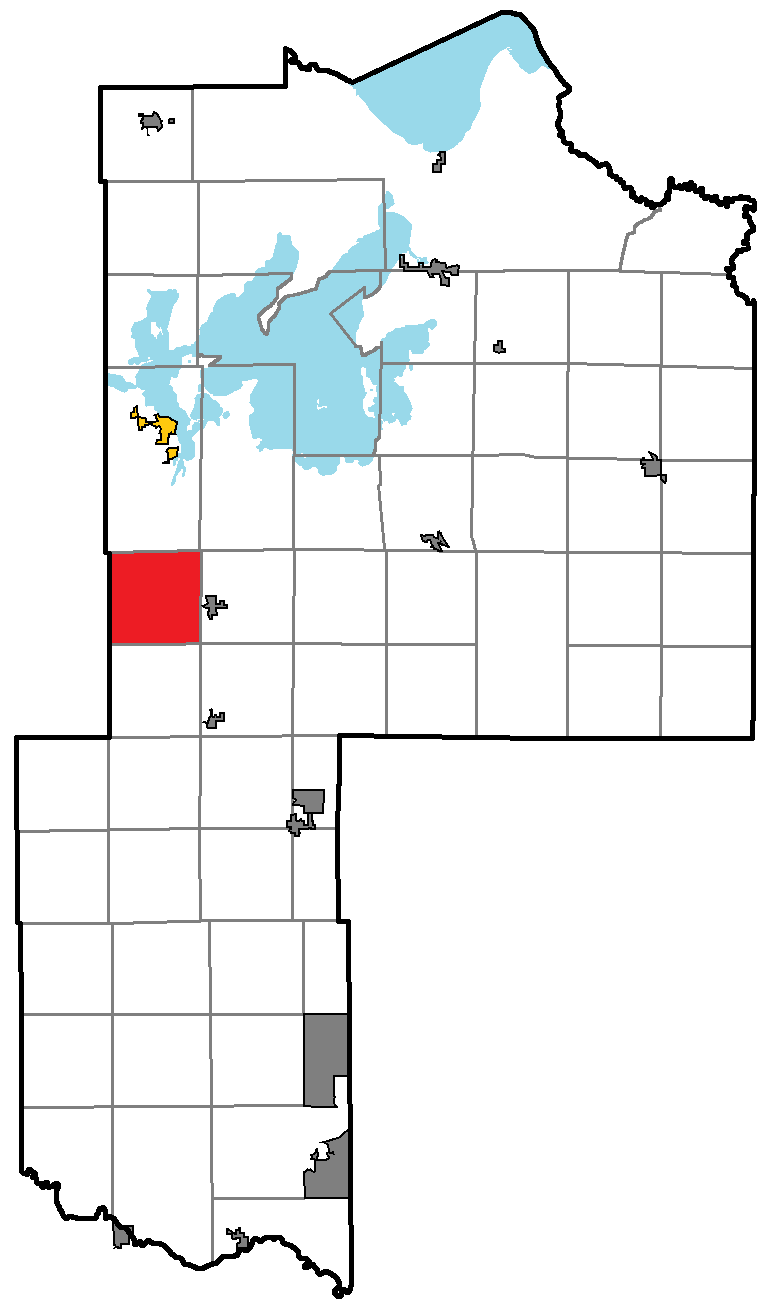
- Location of Hiram Township, within Cass County, Minnesota
- Coordinates: 46°56′25″N 94°35′1″W
- Country: United States
- State: Minnesota
- County: Cass

Area
  - Total: 35.6 sq mi (92.2 km^{2})
  - Land: 27.1 sq mi (70.2 km^{2})
  - Water: 8.5 sq mi (22.0 km^{2})
- Elevation: 1,388 ft (423 m)

Population (2020)
  - Total: 353
  - Density: 13.0/sq mi (5.03/km^{2})
- Time zone: UTC-6 (Central (CST))
  - Summer (DST): UTC-5 (CDT)
- FIPS code: 27-29366
- GNIS feature ID: 0664486
- Website: https://hirammn.com/

Hiram Township is a township in Cass County, Minnesota, United States. The population was 353 as of the 2020 census. Hiram Township was named for Hiram Wilson, a pioneer settler.

== Geography ==
According to the United States Census Bureau, the township has a total area of 35.6 square miles (92 km^{2}), of which 27.1 square miles (70 km^{2}) is land and 8.5 square miles (22 km^{2}) (23.90%) is water.

=== Lakes ===
- Birch Lake (west three-quarters)
- Chub Lake
- Crystal Lake
- Jackpine Lake
- Perch Lake
- Perry Lake
- Tenmile Lake (south three-quarters)
- Tripp Lake
- Variety Lake
- Wegwos Lake

=== Adjacent townships ===
- Shingobee Township (north)
- Turtle Lake Township (northeast)
- Birch Lake Township (east)
- Powers Township (southeast)
- Deerfield Township (south)
- Badoura Township, Hubbard County (southwest)
- White Oak Township, Hubbard County (west)

== Demographics ==
As of the census of 2000, there were 334 people, 157 households, and 118 families residing in the township. The population density was 12.3 inhabitants per square mile (4.7/km^{2}). There were 630 housing units at an average density of 23.3 per square mile (9.0/km^{2}). The racial makeup of the township was 97.60% White, 0.30% Native American, and 2.10% from two or more races. Hispanic or Latino of any race were 0.30% of the population.

There were 157 households, out of which 12.7% had children under the age of 18 living with them, 69.4% were married couples living together, 5.1% had a female householder with no husband present, and 24.8% were non-families. 21.0% of all households were made up of individuals, and 14.0% had someone living alone who was 65 years of age or older. The average household size was 2.13 and the average family size was 2.44.

In the township the population was spread out, with 13.2% under the age of 18, 2.4% from 18 to 24, 15.0% from 25 to 44, 43.1% from 45 to 64, and 26.3% who were 65 years of age or older. The median age was 56 years. For every 100 females, there were 93.1 males. For every 100 females age 18 and over, there were 89.5 males.

The median income for a household in the township was $34,000, and the median income for a family was $36,563. Males had a median income of $29,500 versus $11,964 for females. The per capita income for the township was $22,217. About 14.5% of families and 13.6% of the population were below the poverty line, including 14.0% of those under age 18 and 9.2% of those age 65 or over.
