= Ah-gwah-ching, Minnesota =

Unincorporated community in Minnesota, US

Ah-gwah-ching
- Unincorporated community
- Location within Minnesota Location within the United States
- Coordinates: 47°04′27″N 94°33′46″W
- Country: United States
- State: Minnesota
- County: Cass
- Township: Shingobee Township
- Elevation: 1,335 ft (407 m)
- Time zone: UTC-6 (Central (CST))
  - Summer (DST): UTC-5 (CDT)
- ZIP code: 56430
- Area code: 218
- GNIS feature ID: 659097

Ah-gwah-ching is an unincorporated community in Shingobee Township, Cass County, Minnesota, United States, near Walker.

It is along State Highways 200 (MN 200) and 371 (MN 371), two miles south-southeast of Walker. Ah-gwah-ching has the ZIP code 56430.

The name Ah-gwah-ching means 'out-of-doors' in the Ojibwe language.
