= Jerome Clifford Graba =

American politician

Jerome Clifford "Jerry" Graba (July 7, 1928 – December 7, 2004) was an American politician and farmer.

Graba was born on the family farm in Orton Township, Wadena County, Minnesota. He graduated from the high school in Sebeka, Minnesota in 1945. Graba served in the United States Air Force during the Korean War. Graba was a dairy farmer and a logger. Graba served in the Minnesota House of Representatives in 1983 and 1984 and was a Democrat. Graba died on the family farm in Orton Township, Wadena County, Minnesota.
