= Shingobee Township, Cass County, Minnesota =

Shingobee Township, Minnesota
- Township
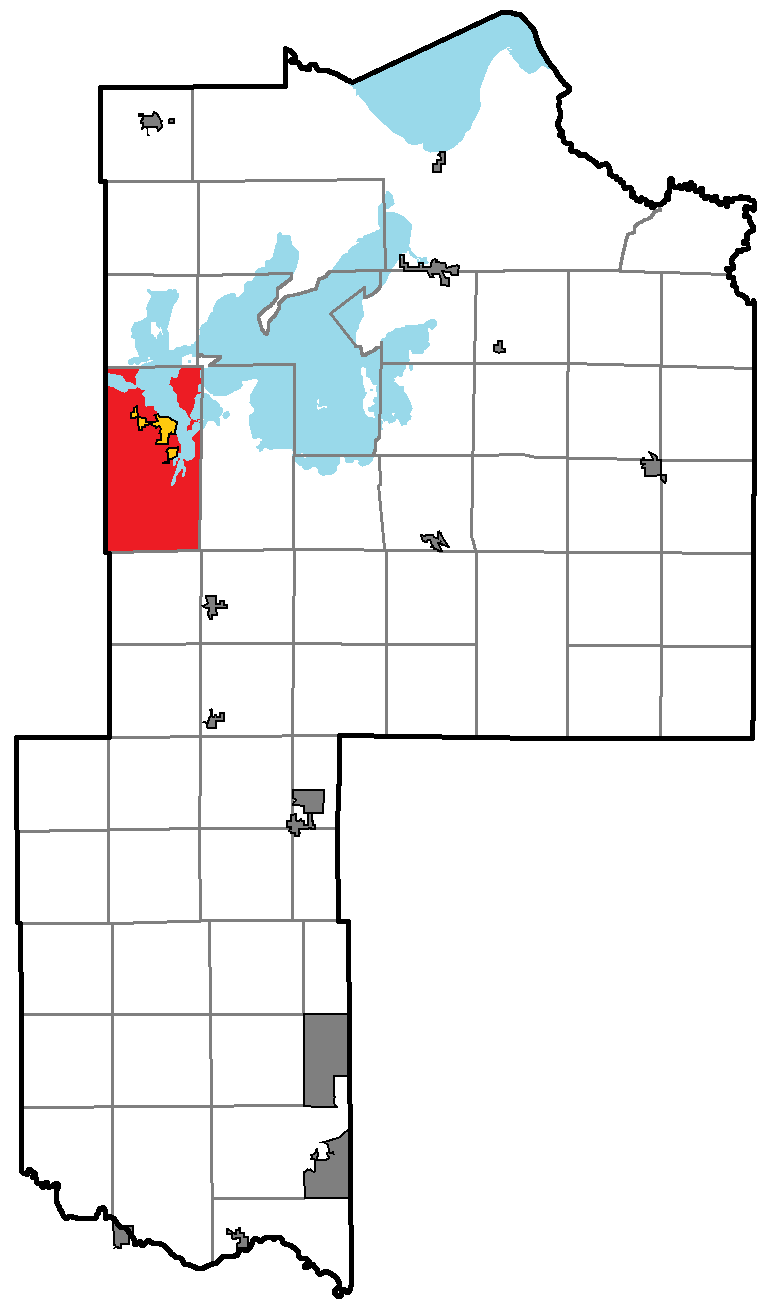
- Location of Shingobee Township, within Cass County, Minnesota
- Coordinates: 47°4′27″N 94°34′41″W
- Country: United States
- State: Minnesota
- County: Cass

Area
  - Total: 71.8 sq mi (185.9 km^{2})
  - Land: 53.7 sq mi (139.1 km^{2})
  - Water: 18.1 sq mi (46.8 km^{2})
- Elevation: 1,414 ft (431 m)

Population (2020)
  - Total: 1,661
  - Density: 30.93/sq mi (11.94/km^{2})
- Time zone: UTC-6 (Central (CST))
  - Summer (DST): UTC-5 (CDT)
- ZIP code: 56484
- Area code: 218
- FIPS code: 27-59872
- GNIS feature ID: 0665601
- Website: https://shingobeemn.govoffice2.com/

Shingobee Township is a township in Cass County, Minnesota, United States. The population was 1,661 as of the 2020 census. This township took its name from the Shingobee River.

== Geography ==
There are two townships, North and South and according to the United States Census Bureau, the townships have a total area of 71.8 square miles (185.9 km^{2}), of which 53.7 square miles (139.1 km^{2}) is land and 18.1 square miles (46.8 km^{2}) (25.16%) is water.

The city of Walker is entirely within this township geographically but is a separate entity.

=== Unincorporated communities ===
- Ah-gwah-ching
- Onigum

=== Major highways ===
- Minnesota State Highway 34
- Minnesota State Highway 200
- Minnesota State Highway 371

=== Lakes ===
- 3rd Lake
- 4th Lake
- 5th Lake
- 6th Lake
- Anoway Lake
- Big Bass Lake
- Cedar Lake
- Cripple Lake
- Cyphers Lake
- Gadbolt Lake
- Gould Lake (southwest three-quarters)
- Howard Lake
- Leech Lake
- Leech Lake (west edge)
- Lembke Lake
- Little Bass Lake
- Lake 34
- Lake Alice
- Lake Bess
- Lake May
- Long Lake
- Lost Lake
- Million Lake
- Muskrat Lake
- Portage Lake
- Scoffner Lake
- Stanley Lake
- Ten Lake
- Tenmile Lake (north quarter)
- Upper Fifth Lake
- Wheeler Lake

=== Adjacent townships ===
- Leech Lake Township (north)
- Turtle Lake Township (east)
- Hiram Township (south)
- White Oak Township, Hubbard County (southwest)
- Akeley Township, Hubbard County (west)
- Steamboat River Township, Hubbard County (west)
- Lakeport Township, Hubbard County (northwest)

=== Cemeteries ===
The township contains Pagan Cemetery.

== Demographics ==
As of the census of 2000, there were 1,745 people, 652 households, and 487 families residing in the township. The population density was 32.5 inhabitants per square mile (12.5/km^{2}). There were 1,194 housing units at an average density of 22.2/sq mi (8.6/km^{2}). The racial makeup of the township was 84.01% White, 0.40% African American, 13.70% Native American, 0.11% Asian, 0.40% from other races, and 1.38% from two or more races. Hispanic or Latino of any race were 1.15% of the population.

There were 652 households, out of which 27.5% had children under the age of 18 living with them, 62.6% were married couples living together, 6.6% had a female householder with no husband present, and 25.3% were non-families. 22.2% of all households were made up of individuals, and 9.5% had someone living alone who was 65 years of age or older. The average household size was 2.44 and the average family size was 2.81.

In the township the population was spread out, with 22.8% under the age of 18, 4.0% from 18 to 24, 21.9% from 25 to 44, 31.0% from 45 to 64, and 20.2% who were 65 years of age or older. The median age was 46 years. For every 100 females, there were 108.0 males. For every 100 females age 18 and over, there were 106.3 males.

The median income for a household in the township was $41,818, and the median income for a family was $46,964. Males had a median income of $31,350 versus $24,219 for females. The per capita income for the township was $20,407. About 7.8% of families and 13.0% of the population were below the poverty line, including 14.9% of those under age 18 and 19.0% of those age 65 or over.
