= Turtle Lake (Douglas County, Minnesota) =

Lake in the state of Minnesota, United States

- Location within Minnesota
- Location: Douglas County, Minnesota
- Coordinates: 45°46′33″N 95°24′7″W
- Type: lake

Turtle Lake is a lake in Douglas County, in the U.S. state of Minnesota.

Turtle Lake was named after the turtles seen there.

== See also ==
- List of lakes in Minnesota
