= Ripley Township, Morrison County, Minnesota =

Ripley Township, Minnesota
- Township
- Location within the state of Minnesota Ripley Township, Minnesota (the United States)
- Coordinates: 46°6′50″N 94°17′19″W
- Country: United States
- State: Minnesota
- County: Morrison

Area
  - Total: 48.4 sq mi (125.4 km^{2})
  - Land: 47.7 sq mi (123.5 km^{2})
  - Water: 0.73 sq mi (1.9 km^{2})
- Elevation: 1,220 ft (372 m)

Population (2000)
  - Total: 692
  - Density: 15/sq mi (5.6/km^{2})
- Time zone: UTC-6 (Central (CST))
  - Summer (DST): UTC-5 (CDT)
- FIPS code: 27-54520
- GNIS feature ID: 0665422

Ripley Township is a township in Morrison County, Minnesota, United States. The population was 692 at the 2000 census.

Ripley Township was named after Fort Ripley.

== Geography ==
According to the United States Census Bureau, the township has a total area of 48.4 square miles (125.4 km^{2}), of which 47.7 square miles (123.5 km^{2}) is land and 0.7 square mile (1.9 km^{2}) (1.53%) is water.

State Highways 371 and 115; and Morrison County Roads 45, 47, 48, and 49 are six of the main routes in the township.

== Demographics ==
As of the census of 2000, there were 692 people, 230 households, and 193 families residing in the township. The population density was 14.5 people per square mile (5.6/km^{2}). There were 254 housing units at an average density of 5.3/sq mi (2.1/km^{2}). The racial makeup of the township was 98.84% White, 0.58% Native American, 0.29% Asian, and 0.29% from two or more races. Hispanic or Latino of any race were 0.29% of the population.

There were 230 households, out of which 41.3% had children under the age of 18 living with them, 74.8% were married couples living together, 4.8% had a female householder with no husband present, and 15.7% were non-families. 13.5% of all households were made up of individuals, and 3.9% had someone living alone who was 65 years of age or older. The average household size was 3.01 and the average family size was 3.31.

In the township the population was spread out, with 31.4% under the age of 18, 7.5% from 18 to 24, 29.0% from 25 to 44, 22.4% from 45 to 64, and 9.7% who were 65 years of age or older. The median age was 36 years. For every 100 females, there were 114.2 males. For every 100 females age 18 and over, there were 111.1 males.

The median income for a household in the township was $38,875, and the median income for a family was $41,250. Males had a median income of $31,711 versus $23,333 for females. The per capita income for the township was $14,881. About 10.1% of families and 14.1% of the population were below the poverty line, including 24.3% of those under age 18 and 15.3% of those age 65 or over.
