= Turtle Lake (Grant County, Minnesota) =

Lake in the state of Minnesota, United States

- Location within Minnesota
- Location: Grant County, Minnesota
- Coordinates: 45°53′3″N 95°50′12″W
- Type: lake

Turtle Lake is a lake in Grant County, in the U.S. state of Minnesota.

Turtle Lake was named after the turtles seen there.

== See also ==
- List of lakes in Minnesota
