= Turtle Lake (Polk County, Minnesota) =

Lake in the state of Minnesota, United States

- Location within Minnesota
- Location: Polk County, Minnesota
- Coordinates: 47°36′47″N 95°40′5″W
- Type: lake

Turtle Lake is a lake in Polk County, in the U.S. state of Minnesota.

The name Turtle Lake comes from the Ojibwe Indians of the area, who thought the lake's outline resembles a turtle.

== See also ==
- List of lakes in Minnesota
