= Oshawa, Nicollet County, Minnesota =

Oshawa
- Unincorporated community
- Location within Minnesota Location within the United States
- Coordinates: 44°18′01″N 94°06′19″W
- Country: United States
- State: Minnesota
- County: Nicollet
- Township: Oshawa Township
- Elevation: 988 ft (301 m)
- Time zone: UTC-6 (Central (CST))
  - Summer (DST): UTC-5 (CDT)
- ZIP code: 56082
- Area code: 507
- GNIS feature ID: 654862

Oshawa is an unincorporated community in Oshawa Township, Nicollet County, Minnesota, United States, near St. Peter. The community is located along 450th Street near 417th Avenue and Nicollet County Road 13.

A post office called Oshawa was established in 1858, and remained in operation until it was discontinued in 1909. The community derives its name from Oshawa, in Ontario.
