= Orton Township, Wadena County, Minnesota =

Orton Township, Minnesota
- Township
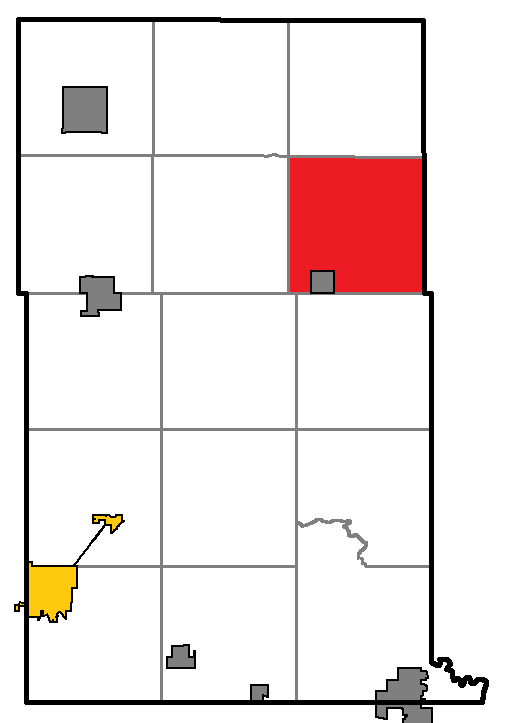
- Location of Orton Township, within Wadena County, Minnesota
- Coordinates: 46°40′24″N 94°50′53″W
- Country: United States
- State: Minnesota
- County: Wadena

Area
  - Total: 34.8 sq mi (90.1 km^{2})
  - Land: 34.4 sq mi (89.1 km^{2})
  - Water: 0.39 sq mi (1.0 km^{2})
- Elevation: 1,350 ft (410 m)

Population (2020)
  - Total: 200
  - Density: 5.8/sq mi (2.2/km^{2})
- Time zone: UTC-6 (Central (CST))
  - Summer (DST): UTC-5 (CDT)
- FIPS code: 27-48688
- GNIS feature ID: 0665220

Orton Township is a township in Wadena County, Minnesota, United States. The population was 200 at the 2020 census.

== History ==
According to Warren Upham, Orton Township was probably named after an early settler. Jerome Clifford Graba (1928-2004), farmer, logger, and Minnesota state legislator, was born on the family farm in Orton Township.

== Geography ==
According to the United States Census Bureau, the township has a total area of 34.8 square miles (90.1 km^{2}); 34.4 square miles (89.1 km^{2}) of it is land and 0.4 square miles (1.0 km^{2}) of it (1.09%) is water.

== Demographics ==
As of the census of 2000, there were 220 people, 85 households, and 62 families residing in the township. The population density was 6.4 people per square mile (2.5/km^{2}). There were 112 housing units at an average density of 3.3/sq mi (1.3/km^{2}). The racial makeup of the township was 95.00% White, 0.45% Asian, 4.09% from other races, and 0.45% from two or more races. Hispanic or Latino of any race were 4.55% of the population.

There were 85 households, out of which 22.4% had children under the age of 18 living with them, 64.7% were married couples living together, 3.5% had a female householder with no husband present, and 25.9% were non-families. 22.4% of all households were made up of individuals, and 15.3% had someone living alone who was 65 years of age or older. The average household size was 2.59 and the average family size was 3.03.

In the township the population was spread out, with 22.7% under the age of 18, 9.1% from 18 to 24, 22.7% from 25 to 44, 29.5% from 45 to 64, and 15.9% who were 65 years of age or older. The median age was 42 years. For every 100 females, there were 107.5 males. For every 100 females age 18 and over, there were 112.5 males.

The median income for a household in the township was $26,875, and the median income for a family was $33,750. Males had a median income of $24,250 versus $17,917 for females. The per capita income for the township was $12,625. About 14.3% of families and 16.7% of the population were below the poverty line, including 19.0% of those under the age of eighteen and 14.6% of those 65 or over.
