= Turtle Lake (Cass County, Minnesota) =

Lake in the state of Minnesota, United States

- Location within Minnesota
- Location: Cass County, Minnesota
- Coordinates: 47°3′48″N 94°29′49″W
- Type: lake

Turtle Lake is a lake in Cass County, Minnesota, in the United States.

"Turtle Lake" is an English translation of the native Ojibwe-language name.

== See also ==
- List of lakes in Minnesota
