= Oshawa Township, Nicollet County, Minnesota =

Oshawa Township, Minnesota
- Township
- Location within the state of Minnesota Oshawa Township, Minnesota (the United States)
- Coordinates: 44°17′47″N 94°2′21″W
- Country: United States
- State: Minnesota
- County: Nicollet

Area
  - Total: 29.6 sq mi (76.7 km^{2})
  - Land: 29.3 sq mi (75.9 km^{2})
  - Water: 0.31 sq mi (0.8 km^{2})
- Elevation: 974 ft (297 m)

Population (2000)
  - Total: 525
  - Density: 18/sq mi (6.9/km^{2})
- Time zone: UTC-6 (Central (CST))
  - Summer (DST): UTC-5 (CDT)
- FIPS code: 27-48922
- GNIS feature ID: 0665229

Oshawa Township is a township in Nicollet County, Minnesota, United States. The population was 525 at the 2000 census.

Oshawa Township was organized in 1858 and named after Oshawa, Ontario, where some settlers came from.

== Geography ==
According to the United States Census Bureau, the township has a total area of 29.6 square miles (76.7 km^{2}), of which 29.3 square miles (75.9 km^{2}) is land and 0.3 square mile (0.8 km^{2}) (1.01%) is water.

== Demographics ==
At the 2000 census, there were 525 people, 170 households and 131 families residing in the township. The population density was 17.9 per square mile (6.9/km^{2}). There were 177 housing units at an average density of 6.0/sq mi (2.3/km^{2}). The racial makeup was 98.10% White, 0.19% Native American, 0.95% Asian, 0.19% from other races, and 0.57% from two or more races. Hispanic or Latino of any race were 0.76% of the population.

There were 170 households, of which 38.2% had children under the age of 18 living with them, 69.4% were married couples living together, 4.7% had a female householder with no husband present, and 22.4% were non-families. 20.6% of all households were made up of individuals, and 6.5% had someone living alone who was 65 years of age or older. The average household size was 2.75 and the average family size was 3.18.

26.9% of the population were under the age of 18, 14.5% from 18 to 24, 22.5% from 25 to 44, 23.6% from 45 to 64, and 12.6% who were 65 years of age or older. The median age was 37 years. For every 100 females, there were 105.1 males. For every 100 females age 18 and over, there were 103.2 males.

The median household income was $54,271 and the median family income was $61,250. Males had a median income of $38,864 and females $27,596. The per capita income was $19,768. About 2.9% of families and 2.9% of the population were below the poverty line, including none of those under age 18 and 11.1% of those age 65 or over.
