= Green Prairie Township, Morrison County, Minnesota =

Green Prairie Township, Minnesota
- Township
- Location within the state of Minnesota Green Prairie Township, Minnesota (the United States)
- Coordinates: 46°4′16″N 94°21′30″W
- Country: United States
- State: Minnesota
- County: Morrison

Area
  - Total: 16.7 sq mi (43.3 km^{2})
  - Land: 16.0 sq mi (41.5 km^{2})
  - Water: 0.69 sq mi (1.8 km^{2})
- Elevation: 1,135 ft (346 m)

Population (2000)
  - Total: 665
  - Density: 41/sq mi (16/km^{2})
- Time zone: UTC-6 (Central (CST))
  - Summer (DST): UTC-5 (CDT)
- FIPS code: 27-25784
- GNIS feature ID: 0664345

Green Prairie Township is a township in Morrison County, Minnesota, United States. The population was 665 at the 2000 census.

Green Prairie Township was organized in 1868, and named for Charles H. Green, an early settler who was killed in the Civil War.

== Geography ==
According to the United States Census Bureau, the township has a total area of 16.7 square miles (43 km^{2}), of which 16.0 square miles (41 km^{2}) is land and 0.7 square miles (1.8 km^{2}) (4.12%) is water.

== Demographics ==
As of the census of 2000, there were 665 people, 244 households, and 189 families residing in the township. The population density was 41.5 inhabitants per square mile (16.0/km^{2}). There were 262 housing units at an average density of 16.3 per square mile (6.3/km^{2}). The racial makeup of the township was 99.40% White and 0.60% Native American.

There were 244 households, out of which 36.9% had children under the age of 18 living with them, 65.6% were married couples living together, 5.3% had a female householder with no husband present, and 22.5% were non-families. 19.7% of all households were made up of individuals, and 7.0% had someone living alone who was 65 years of age or older. The average household size was 2.73 and the average family size was 3.14.

In the township the population was spread out, with 29.3% under the age of 18, 5.9% from 18 to 24, 31.7% from 25 to 44, 24.1% from 45 to 64, and 9.0% who were 65 years of age or older. The median age was 36 years. For every 100 females, there were 102.1 males. For every 100 females age 18 and over, there were 108.9 males.

The median income for a household in the township was $39,444, and the median income for a family was $47,222. Males had a median income of $33,750 versus $27,500 for females. The per capita income for the township was $17,013. About 5.9% of families and 5.2% of the population were below the poverty line, including 1.7% of those under age 18 and 22.4% of those age 65 or over.
