= Minnesota State Highway 371 =

State highway in Minnesota, United States

Trunk Highway 371
- MN 371, Bus. MN 371

Route information
- Maintained by MnDOT
- Length: 107.411 mi (172.861 km)
- Existed: 1973–present
- Tourist routes: Great River Road

Major junctions
- South end: US 10 at Little Falls
- MN 115 at Camp Ripley Junction; Bus. MN 371 near Brainerd; MN 210 at Baxter; MN 84 at Pine River; MN 87 at Backus; MN 34 / MN 200 at Walker
- North end: US 2 at Cass Lake

Location
- Country: United States
- State: Minnesota
- Counties: Morrison, Crow Wing, Cass

Highway system
- Minnesota Trunk Highway System; Interstate; US; State; Legislative; Scenic
← MN 361	→ I-394

Minnesota State Highway 371 (MN 371) is a 107.411-mile-long (172.861 km) state highway in central and north-central Minnesota. The route connects Minnesota's northern lakes region with the central part of the state. It runs north–south from U.S. Highway 10 (US 10) in Little Falls to US 2 in Cass Lake. MN 371 has become a heavily traveled arterial route that was once a two-lane roadway over almost all of its length, but has been widened to four lanes across most of its southern half. Much of the traffic on the route is Twin Cities-based traffic heading to their cabins on one of the many northern lakes.

== Route description ==
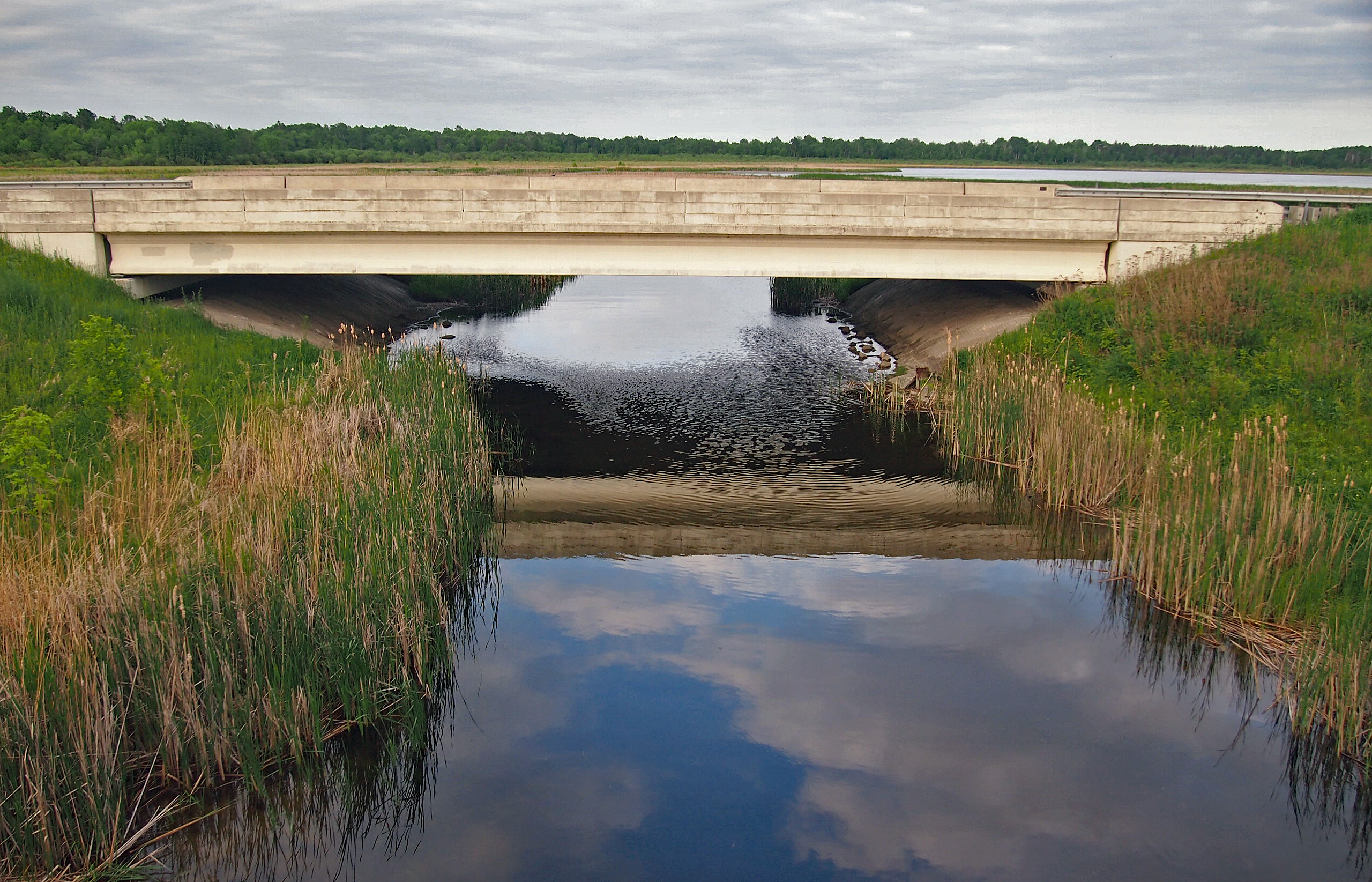
MN 371 crossing the Steamboat River

MN 371 serves as a south–north route in central and north-central Minnesota between Little Falls, Baxter, Brainerd, Nisswa, Pequot Lakes, Walker, and Cass Lake.

The highway is a four-lane expressway, with some freeway segments, from Little Falls to Jenkins at County Road 16 (CR 16) in Crow Wing County. From that point north, the road becomes a two-lane highway for the remainder of the route. Rural four-lane segments are generally posted at a maximum 65 miles per hour (105 km/h) speed limit, with open-road two-lane segments set for a maximum 60-mile-per-hour (97 km/h) speed limit.

MN 371 departs from US 10 at Little Falls heading north, paralleling the Mississippi River on the east side of the river. MN 371 is a freeway-standard route coming off US 10 as it passes on the west side of Little Falls's industrial sector. The first interchange heading northbound is with CR 46, which is the only interchange within the Little Falls area for the freeway portion.

After Little Falls the route enters rural farmland, which characterizes the rest of the route's freeway portion. The next interchange is near the Fort Ripley military base, where it meets MN 115 and CR 47 at a diamond interchange. MN 115 serves the military base to the west; a large tank used as a monument is on the east side of the interchange. It formerly sat on the west side of MN 371 before the interchange with MN 115 was built in the early 2000s. This interchange with MN 115 was the last part of the MN 371 freeway upgrade to be completed.

The MN 371 freeway ends a few miles north of MN 115 at CR 48, but maintains a four-lane divided highway configuration. North of CR 48, MN 371 crosses into Crow Wing County and enters the town of Fort Ripley, spending a short time passing through the center of the town. It quickly leaves Fort Ripley and continues north as the landscape steadily becomes less farm-oriented and more forested. After Fort Ripley the highway turns northeast for several miles and clips the southeast corner of Crow Wing State Park.

A few more miles northeast, MN 371 intersects Business MN 371 (Bus. MN 371); this is the Brainerd exit. In 2000, MN 371 was moved onto the C. Elmer Anderson Memorial Highway, which bypasses Brainerd to the west, and the old roadway into downtown Brainerd was redesignated Bus. MN 371. MN 371 itself turns back to the north and crosses the Mississippi River before entering Baxter, a smaller city just west of Brainerd. In Baxter, MN 371 intersects MN 210, another major arterial route for northern Minnesota. MN 371 heads north through Baxter's business district, then enters the Gull Lake area, a popular tourist destination.

MN 371 crosses an intersection with CR 77 and CR 48. CR 77 is a three-quarter loop around Gull Lake to the west, while MN 371 makes up the eastern quarter. MN 371 passes north past several lakes and many resorts, and reaches the town of Nisswa at a junction with CR 77 and CR 13; CR 13 goes into Nisswa, while CR 77 goes back around Gull Lake to the west. MN 371 remains a four-lane divided highway, as the landscape becomes noticeably more forested.

The next town on the route is Pequot Lakes, most famous for its fishing bobber water tower. MN 371 exceeds freeway standards from the intersection with CR 107 to the intersection with CR 112 and Patriot Avenue. Right after the intersection with CR 16, MN 371 turns into a two-lane road (one lane in each direction). The road leaves the town behind quickly. Several miles north of Pequot Lakes and after passing through the town of Jenkins, MN 371 enters Cass County.

The forested landscape subsides for a short while as MN 371 comes to the town of Pine River, the largest town on the route between Brainerd and Walker, where it intersects the southern terminus of MN 84. MN 84 heads northeast to Chickamaw Beach and Longville while MN 371 continues due north.

The forests return as MN 371 reaches the town of Backus, on Pine Mountain Lake, where it meets MN 87 for a short concurrency. After MN 87 splits off to the east just past Backus Airport, MN 371 heads into rural forest for about 22 miles (35 km), broken only by the small town of Hackensack before reaching MN 200 just south of Walker, a regionally important city in northern Minnesota. MN 371 and MN 200 begin an eight-mile (13 km) concurrency at this intersection; MN 371 north and MN 200 west continue northwest together as they pass around Walker Bay, the western arm of Leech Lake, one of Minnesota's largest lakes. The two pass the former Ah-gwah-ching facility, which was serviced by the unsigned MN 290.

MN 371/MN 200 concurrently reaches downtown Walker, a town where most amenities can be found. Also in Walker is the eastern terminus of MN 34, which provides the main route between Walker, Park Rapids, and Detroit Lakes to the west.

Several miles northwest of Walker, MN 200 splits off MN 371, heading west toward Lake Itasca while MN 371 heads north. MN 371 intersects no more state highways on its mainline routing after this intersection. Meanwhile, the landscape becomes less treelined and hillier as the route progresses toward Cass Lake, the final city on MN 371. The route enters Cass Lake from the south, passes through downtown and ends at US 2 just north of downtown, although the roadway itself continues north as a local street.

=== Memorial designations ===
- On August 7, 2006, the highway was dedicated as the Purple Heart Memorial Highway in honor of veterans who have been wounded or died in combat.
- Until 2005, most of MN 371, except the Brainerd bypass, was also officially designated the Paul Bunyan Expressway. This was a unique name designation because the portion of MN 371 from Pequot Lakes to Cass Lake is not built to expressway standards.
- The 6-mile (9.7 km) portion of 371 bypass around Brainerd is officially designated the C. Elmer Anderson Memorial Highway.

== History ==
U.S. Highway 371
- Location: Little Falls–Bemidji
- Existed: 1931–1973

MN 371 was originally designated as US 371 from 1931 to 1973. In 1973, it was designated MN 371. The former US 371 designation was concurrent with US 2 from 1931 to 1973 between Cass Lake and Bemidji with a terminus at US 71.

In 1994, US 371 was recycled and reassigned to a concatenation of state highways in Arkansas and Louisiana to form a new US 371 that has no relationship to the old US (now MN 371) other than being associated with US 71 as the parent number.

=== Improvements ===
For the most part MN 371 has been a high-volume, two-lane highway. Because of increases in traffic, especially during times of peak recreational demand, MN 371 has been the focus of many upgrades in the area:

- In 2005, the remaining segment of the project that converted MN 371 to a four-lane expressway from Little Falls to Baxter was completed. This project included a bypass of Brainerd, which opened in 2000. The old route through Brainerd is now signed Bus. MN 371.
- There are plans to upgrade the entire 16-mile (26 km) segment of MN 371 from Nisswa to Pine River to a four-lane expressway. The portion of this segment from Nisswa to Crow Wing County Road 16 near Jenkins has been completed to four-lane expressway standards. This includes a bypass around Pequot Lakes completed in 2017.

== Major intersections ==
County	Location	mi	km	Destinations	Notes
Morrison	Little Falls	0.000	0.000	US 10 east – St. Cloud	Southern terminus; no access to US 10 west, nor from US 10 east; expressway continues east as US 10
Morrison	Little Falls	2.149– 2.273	3.458– 3.658	CSAH 46 / CSAH 76 – Little Falls	CSAH 46 provides access to CSAH 76, which parallels MN 371 to the west
Morrison	Ripley Township	4.759– 4.802	7.659– 7.728	MN 115 west / CSAH 47 east / Great River Road (National Route) – Randall	Southern end of Great River Road concurrency; northern end of expressway; eastern terminus of MN 115
Crow Wing	Crow Wing Township	23.031	37.065	Bus. MN 371 north – Brainerd	Interchange; southern terminus of Bus. MN 371
Crow Wing	Mississippi River	24.389– 24.489	39.250– 39.411	Minnesota Highway 371 Bridge	
Crow Wing	Baxter			Great River Road (National Route) (College Road)	Northern end of Great River Road concurrency
Crow Wing	Baxter	27.498– 27.512	44.254– 44.276	Bus. MN 371 south / MN 210 – Brainerd, Baxter	Northern terminus of Bus. MN 371
Crow Wing	Pequot Lakes	46.862	75.417	CSAH 11 – Pequot Lakes, Breezy Point	Dumbbell interchange
Cass	Pine River	56.204	90.452	MN 84 north – Longville	Southern terminus of MN 84
Cass	Backus	65.213	104.950	MN 87 west – Menahga	Southern end of MN 87 concurrency
Cass	Powers Township	66.213	106.559	MN 87 east – Pontoria	Northern end of MN 87 concurrency
Cass	Ah-gwah-ching	81.798	131.641	MN 200 east – Remer, Hill City	Southern end of MN 200 concurrency
Cass	Walker	86.524	139.247	MN 34 west – Akeley, Park Rapids	
Cass	Shingobee Township	90.605	145.815	MN 200 west – Mahnomen	Northern end of MN 200 concurrency
Cass	Cass Lake	107.411	172.861	US 2 – Grand Rapids, Bemidji	Northern terminus; road continues as Aspen Avenue
1.000 mi = 1.609 km; 1.000 km = 0.621 mi: Concurrency terminus; Incomplete access

== Business route ==
Business Trunk Highway 371
- Location: Brainerd
- Length: 5 mi (8.0 km)

Business Trunk Highway 371 (Bus. MN 371) is a business route through Brainerd. Before the Brainerd bypass opened in 2000, Old MN 371 went through downtown Brainerd, then proceeded west on a two-mile (3.2 km) concurrency with MN 210 before turning north at its current intersection in Baxter. Due to the addition of new highway mileage from the new bypass, the old route of MN 371 was a candidate for turnback to local jurisdiction. Because of local preference to keep the old routing of MN 371 part of the state trunk highway system, it was agreed that portions of other highways in the surrounding area would be turned back instead: MN 18 from MN 210 to MN 25, and the two-block long MN 322 would be given to the city of Brainerd maintenance, and MN 25 north of MN 210 to its terminus at Merrifield would be given to Crow Wing County maintenance as an extension of CR 3. The route of Old MN 371 that went through downtown Brainerd then proceeded west to Baxter was redesignated as the business route in 2000. The business route is five miles (8.0 km) long.
