= Badoura Township, Hubbard County, Minnesota =

Badoura Township, Minnesota
- Township
- Location of Badoura Township, within Hubbard County, Minnesota
- Coordinates: 46°51′21″N 94°43′46″W
- Country: United States
- State: Minnesota
- County: Hubbard

Area
  - Total: 36.5 sq mi (94.5 km^{2})
  - Land: 35.5 sq mi (91.9 km^{2})
  - Water: 1.0 sq mi (2.6 km^{2})
- Elevation: 1,414 ft (431 m)

Population (2020)
  - Total: 152
  - Density: 4.28/sq mi (1.65/km^{2})
- Time zone: UTC-6 (Central (CST))
  - Summer (DST): UTC-5 (CDT)
- FIPS code: 27-03178
- GNIS feature ID: 0663492

Badoura Township is a township in Hubbard County, Minnesota, United States. The population was 152 at the 2020 census.

Badoura Township was named for Mary Badoura Mow, the wife of an early settler.

== Geography ==
According to the United States Census Bureau, the township has a total area of 36.5 square miles (95 km^{2}), of which 35.5 square miles (92 km^{2}) is land and 1.0 square mile (2.6 km^{2}) (2.74%) is water.

Minnesota State Highways 64 and 87 are two of the main routes in the community.

== Demographics ==
As of the census of 2000, there were 101 people, 41 households, and 30 families residing in the township. The population density was 2.8 inhabitants per square mile (1.1/km^{2}). There were 113 housing units at an average density of 3.2 per square mile (1.2/km^{2}). The racial makeup of the township was 99.01% White and 0.99% Asian. Hispanic or Latino of any race were 0.99% of the population.

There were 41 households, out of which 24.4% had children under the age of 18 living with them, 70.7% were married couples living together, 2.4% had a female householder with no husband present, and 24.4% were non-families. 22.0% of all households were made up of individuals, and 12.2% had someone living alone who was 65 years of age or older. The average household size was 2.46 and the average family size was 2.87.

In the township the population was spread out, with 17.8% under the age of 18, 7.9% from 18 to 24, 20.8% from 25 to 44, 26.7% from 45 to 64, and 26.7% who were 65 years of age or older. The median age was 48 years. For every 100 females, there were 102.0 males. For every 100 females age 18 and over, there were 107.5 males.

The median income for a household in the township was $31,875, and the median income for a family was $37,813. Males had a median income of $25,000 versus $37,917 for females. The per capita income for the township was $13,465. About 9.5% of families and 17.5% of the population were below the poverty line, including 54.5% of those under the age of 18 and none of those 65 and older.
