= Minnesota State Highway 87 =

State highway in Minnesota, United States

Trunk Highway 87
- MN 87 highlighted in red

Route information
- Maintained by MnDOT
- Length: 83.201 mi (133.899 km)
- Existed: 1933–present

Major junctions
- West end: US 10 at Frazee
- US 71 at Menahga; MN 64 at Badoura; MN 371 at Backus
- East end: MN 84 at Ponto Lake Township

Location
- Country: United States
- State: Minnesota
- Counties: Becker, Wadena, Hubbard, Cass

Highway system
- Minnesota Trunk Highway System; Interstate; US; State; Legislative; Scenic
← MN 86	→ MN 89

Minnesota State Highway 87 (MN 87) is an 83.201-mile-long (133.899 km) highway in north-central and northwest Minnesota, which runs from its interchange with U.S. Highway 10 at Frazee and continues east to its eastern terminus at its intersection with State Highway 84 in Ponto Lake Township, 7 miles (11 km) east of Backus and 11 miles (18 km) southwest of Longville.

== Route description ==
Highway 87 serves as an east–west route in north-central and northwest Minnesota between Frazee, Menahga, and Backus.

The route passes through the following forests:

- Badoura State Forest in southeast Hubbard County
- Foot Hills State Forest in Cass County

The eastern terminus of Highway 87 intersects State Highway 84 about midway between Pine River and Longville.

Highway 87 has short concurrencies with State Highway 64 at Badoura and Highway 371 at Backus. Highway 87 also runs together with U.S. Highway 71 at Menahga, south of Park Rapids.

Highway 87 is also known as Lake Street in the city of Frazee. The route is also known as West Main Street in Menahga. Highway 87 follows Front Street and Washburn Avenue in Backus.

== History ==
Highway 87 was authorized in 1933.

The route still had gravel sections in 1953. Highway 87 was completely paved by 1960.

== Major intersections ==
County	Location	mi	km	Destinations	Notes
Becker	Burlington Township	0.000– 0.116	0.000– 0.187	US 10 / CSAH 29 – Detroit Lakes, Wadena, Vergas	Interchange
Wadena	Menahga	32.695	52.618	US 71 south / CSAH 17 east – Sebeka	South end of US 71 overlap
Hubbard	Straight River Township	40.851	65.743	US 71 / CSAH 14 west	North end of US 71 overlap
Hubbard	Badoura Township	59.779	96.205	MN 64 north – Akeley	West end of MN 64 overlap
Cass	McKinley Township	64.652	104.047	MN 64 south – Motley	East end of MN 64 overlap
Cass	Powers Township	76.012	122.329	MN 371 south / CR 117 – Brainerd	South end of MN 371 overlap
Cass	Powers Township	77.027	123.963	MN 371 north – Walker	North end of MN 371 overlap
Cass	Ponto Lake Township	84.873	136.590	MN 84	Wye intersection
1.000 mi = 1.609 km; 1.000 km = 0.621 mi: Concurrency terminus
