= Backus, Minnesota =

City in Minnesota, United States

Backus
- City
- Location of Backus within Cass County, Minnesota
- Coordinates: 46°49′15″N 94°30′53″W
- Country: United States
- State: Minnesota
- County: Cass

Government
  - Mayor: Kurt Sawyer

Area
  - Total: 0.62 sq mi (1.61 km^{2})
  - Land: 0.62 sq mi (1.61 km^{2})
  - Water: 0.0039 sq mi (0.01 km^{2})
- Elevation: 1,342 ft (409 m)

Population (2020)
  - Total: 263
  - Density: 424.3/sq mi (163.84/km^{2})
- Time zone: UTC-6 (Central (CST))
  - Summer (DST): UTC-5 (CDT)
- ZIP code: 56435
- Area code: 218
- FIPS code: 27-03124
- GNIS feature ID: 2394048
- Website: https://cityofbackusmn.gov/

Backus is a city in Cass County, Minnesota, United States. The population was 262 at the 2020 census. It is part of the Brainerd Micropolitan Statistical Area.

== History ==
A post office called Backus has been in operation since 1896. The city was named for Edward Wellington Backus, a businessperson in the lumber industry.

== Geography ==
According to the United States Census Bureau, the city has a total area of 0.61 square miles (1.58 km^{2}), all land.

== Demographics ==
Historical population
Census	Pop.	Note	%±
1910	184		—
1920	297		61.4%
1930	314		5.7%
1940	334		6.4%
1950	367		9.9%
1960	317		−13.6%
1970	257		−18.9%
1980	255		−0.8%
1990	240		−5.9%
2000	311		29.6%
2010	250		−19.6%
2020	263		5.2%
U.S. Decennial Census

=== 2010 census ===
As of the census of 2010, there were 250 people, 112 households, and 62 families living in the city. The population density was 409.8 inhabitants per square mile (158.2/km^{2}). There were 183 housing units at an average density of 300.0 per square mile (115.8/km^{2}). The racial makeup of the city was 94.8% White, 0.8% Native American, 0.4% Pacific Islander, 0.4% from other races, and 3.6% from two or more races. Hispanic or Latino of any race were 0.8% of the population.

There were 112 households, of which 26.8% had children under the age of 18 living with them, 38.4% were married couples living together, 12.5% had a female householder with no husband present, 4.5% had a male householder with no wife present, and 44.6% were non-families. 33.9% of all households were made up of individuals, and 16.1% had someone living alone who was 65 years of age or older. The average household size was 2.23 and the average family size was 2.79.

The median age in the city was 46.7 years. 23.6% of residents were under the age of 18; 4.8% were between the ages of 18 and 24; 19.2% were from 25 to 44; 35.2% were from 45 to 64; and 17.2% were 65 years of age or older. The gender makeup of the city was 52.0% male and 48.0% female.

=== 2000 census ===
As of the census of 2000, there were 311 people, 123 households, and 83 families living in the city. The population density was 518.9 inhabitants per square mile (200.3/km^{2}). There were 194 housing units, at an average density of 323.7 per square mile (125.0/km^{2}). The racial makeup of the city was 98.07% White, 0.64% Asian, and 1.29% from two or more races.

There were 123 households, out of which 34.1% had children under the age of 18 living with them, 43.9% were married couples living together, 17.1% had a female householder with no husband present, and 32.5% were non-families. 29.3% of all households were made up of individuals, and 14.6% had someone living alone who was 65 years of age or older. The average household size was 2.53 and the average family size was 3.12.

In the city, the population was spread out, with 30.2% under the age of 18, 9.0% from 18 to 24, 25.7% from 25 to 44, 15.8% from 45 to 64, and 19.3% who were 65 years of age or older. The median age was 37 years. For every 100 females, there were 106.0 males. For every 100 females age 18 and over, there were 99.1 males.

The median income for a household in the city was $26,875, and the median income for a family was $32,500. Males had a median income of $26,563 versus $13,438 for females. The per capita income for the city was $12,077. About 16.3% of families and 23.0% of the population were below the poverty line, including 36.4% of those under age 18 and 14.3% of those age 65 or over.

== Infrastructure ==
=== Transportation ===
Minnesota State Highways 87 and 371 are two of the main routes in the community.

== Education ==
Public education is provided by the Pine River-Backus School District.
