= Lake Hubert, Minnesota =

Unincorporated community in Minnesota, United States

Lake Hubert
- Unincorporated community
- Location within Minnesota Location within the United States
- Coordinates: 46°30′08″N 94°15′27″W
- Country: United States
- State: Minnesota
- County: Crow Wing
- Township: Lake Edward Township
- Elevation: 1,204 ft (367 m)
- Time zone: UTC-6 (Central (CST))
  - Summer (DST): UTC-5 (CDT)
- ZIP code: 56459
- Area code: 218
- GNIS feature ID: 646364

Lake Hubert is an unincorporated community in Lake Edward Township, Crow Wing County, Minnesota, United States. Lake Hubert is 2 miles (3.2 km) southeast of Nisswa. It is along Crow Wing County Road 13 near County Road 137. Lake Hubert has the ZIP code 56459.

== History ==
A post office called Lake Hubert was established in 1929, and remained in operation until it was discontinued in 1998. The community took its name from nearby Lake Hubert.
