= Lake Hubert =

Lake Hubert may refer to:

- Lake Hubert, Minnesota, an unincorporated community
- Lake Hubert (Minnesota), a lake in Minnesota
