= Pequot Lakes High School =

Location
- 30805 Olson St; Pequot Lakes, Minnesota 56472; United States
- Coordinates: 46°36′N 94°19′W

Information
- Type: Public
- Motto: Respect, Responsibility, and Integrity
- Established: 1976
- School district: Pequot Lakes Public Schools
- Principal: Aaron Nelson
- Teaching staff: 37.26 (FTE)
- Enrollment: 639 (2023–2024)
- Student to teacher ratio: 17.15
- Mascot: Patriots (Eagle)
- Colors: Red, White, and Blue
- Website: www.isd186.org/hs-home-page

Pequot Lakes High School (PLHS) is a 9–12 high school located a few blocks west of Minnesota State Highway 371 towards the southern end of the city of Pequot Lakes, Minnesota, United States. The school was built at its present location in 1976, and the music wing in the front of the building was completed in 2004. PLHS is the only high school in the Pequot Lakes School District (ISD 186) which includes Pequot Lakes and the surrounding communities of Breezy Point, Crosslake, Jenkins, Ideal Township and parts of northern Nisswa (the majority of Nisswa is in the Brainerd School District). The current principal is Aaron Nelson.

== Sports ==
The athletics teams are the Patriots. Some of these noteworthy accomplishments include:

- Boys' basketball - winning the Section 7AA title to achieve the school's first ever State Tournament berth after an 11-12 regular season in 2004, then going 28–0 in 2006 before losing in the State quarterfinals. In 2007, the Patriots again won the Section 7AA title and finished third in Class AA with victories over Gibbon-Fairfax-Winthrop and Luverne and a loss to the eventual State Runner-up, Maple River.
- Girls' basketball - qualifying for the State Tournament in 1998, 1999 and 2005 when they took second place. They also traveled to the State tournament in 2010 and 2011, where they finished fourth.
- Girls' golf - winning two Class A State Championships, the first in 2002 and the second in 2004.
- Knowledge Bowl - qualifying for the Minnesota State Knowledge Bowl Meet in 1998, 2000, 2003, 2004, and 2015 winning the school's first ever Region 5 Championship in 2003, finishing fifth at State in 2004 and most recently conference champions and section champions in 2015.
- Dance team - qualifying for the MSHSL State Tournament nine years in a row (2000 - 2009), finishing second in the jazz/funk category in 2001 and third in jazz/funk in 2002.

State Championships
Season	Sport	Number of Championships	Year
Fall	Cross Country, Boys	2	1955, 1961
Winter	Basketball, Girls	1	2005
Winter	Basketball, Boys	1	2006. 2022, 2023, 2024
Spring	Golf, Girls	2	2002, 2004

== Notable alumni ==
- Mark Kennedy (politician) - president of the University of North Dakota
- Dru Sjodin - Murder victim
