= Longville, Minnesota =

City in Minnesota, United States

Longville
- City
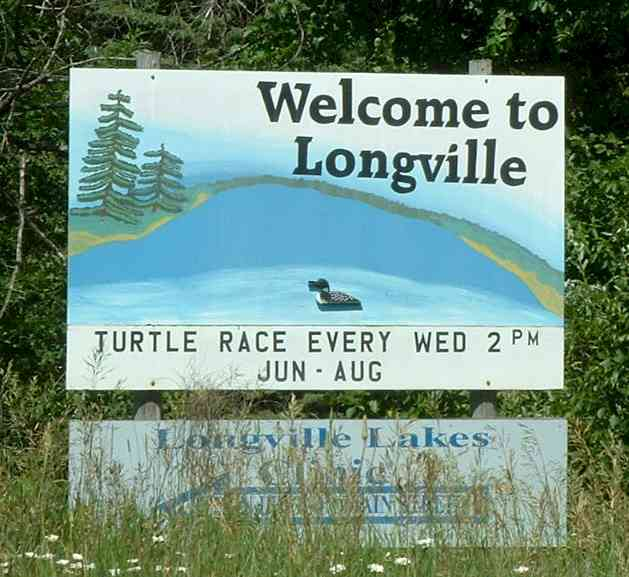
- Longville Welcome Sign

- Location of Longville within Cass County, Minnesota
- Coordinates: 46°59′16″N 94°12′44″W
- Country: United States
- State: Minnesota
- County: Cass

Area
  - Total: 0.88 sq mi (2.28 km^{2})
  - Land: 0.85 sq mi (2.20 km^{2})
  - Water: 0.027 sq mi (0.07 km^{2})
- Elevation: 1,339 ft (408 m)

Population (2020)
  - Total: 153
  - Density: 179.9/sq mi (69.45/km^{2})
- Time zone: UTC-6 (Central (CST))
  - Summer (DST): UTC-5 (CDT)
- ZIP code: 56655
- Area code: 218
- FIPS code: 27-38114
- GNIS feature ID: 2395761
- Website: City of Longville

Longville is a city in Cass County, Minnesota, United States. The population was 153 at the 2020 census. The city was named after its founder, Jim Long. It is roughly four hours north of the Twin Cities. It is part of the Brainerd Micropolitan Statistical Area. Minnesota State Highway 84 serves as a main route in the community, and Minnesota State Highway 200 is nearby. Longville is home to Longville Municipal Airport.

== Geography ==
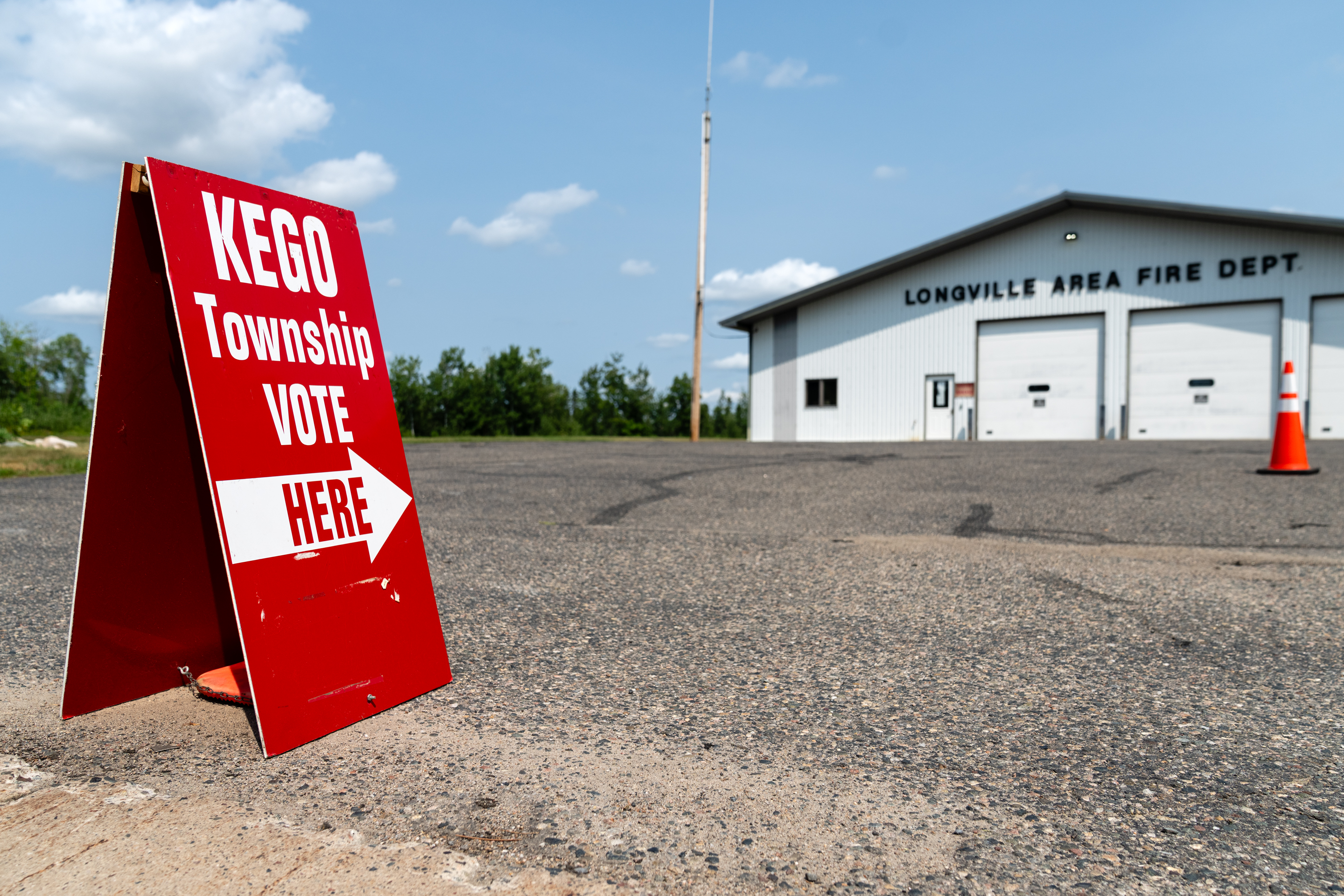
Kego Township "Vote Here" sign outside Longville Area Fire Department

According to the United States Census Bureau, the city has an area of 0.86 square miles (2.23 km^{2}), of which 0.84 square miles (2.18 km^{2}) is land and 0.02 square miles (0.05 km^{2}) is water.

Longville is part of the Northern Minnesota's glacial plain, which was flattened by glaciers during the most recent glacial advance. During the last glacial period, massive ice sheets at least 0.62 miles (1 km) thick ravaged the state's landscape and sculpted its terrain. The Wisconsin glaciation left 12,000 years ago. These glaciers covered all of Minnesota except the far southeast, an area characterized by steep hills and streams that cut into the bedrock. Since the landscape is going through post-glacial rebound, it is poorly drained, creating Cass County's numerous lakes and rivers.

Longville's cultural landscape and its surrounding lands can be characterized as seasonal and recreational. The bulk of human activity occurs in the summer when the cabin owners vacation at their lake homes, and the activities they engage in are mostly recreational.

=== Notable lakes ===
Long Lake lies immediately north of town. It is very deep, up to 110 feet (34 m), and drops off rather quickly from shore. This is very unusual for lakes of this size in the region. They are normally no more than 50 feet (15 m) deep.

Girl Lake lies to the west, part of the Woman Lake Chain.

== History ==
The area was inhabited for thousands of years by succeeding cultures of Indians. Before European settlement, the Ojibwe moved into the area from the Great Lakes, pushing out the historic Dakota peoples, such as the Assiniboine and Hidatsa. European American settlers followed the early fur traders and trappers, and encroached on Native American territories.

Longville started around 1906 as a logging town in what is now Cass County. Fishing was very popular in early Longville and is still prevalent today. Tourism later grew as a service industry. In the 20th century, people from urban areas came to more rural areas for recreation associated with lakes, fishing, hunting and water sports.All the roads in and around Longville were dirt until the 1920s. Much of the downtown was rebuilt during the mid-20th century. Many of the cabins in the surrounding landscape were built in the late 1960s and 1970s. By the 1980s the Longville area was almost fully developed. The town has changed little since 1990.

The city of Longville is known for its weekly turtle races throughout the summer months, which making the city the "Turtle Racing Capital of the World" Similarly, nearby cities such as Nisswa and Perham host weekly turtle races during the summer months as well.

== Demographics ==
Historical population
Census	Pop.	Note	%±
1950	116		—
1960	159		37.1%
1970	171		7.5%
1980	191		11.7%
1990	224		17.3%
2000	180		−19.6%
2010	156		−13.3%
2020	153		−1.9%
U.S. Decennial Census

=== 2010 census ===
As of the census of 2010, there were 156 people, 92 households, and 41 families residing in the city. The population density was 185.7 inhabitants per square mile (71.7/km^{2}). There were 164 housing units at an average density of 195.2 per square mile (75.4/km^{2}). The racial makeup of the city was 100.0% White.

There were 92 households, of which 10.9% had children under the age of 18 living with them, 35.9% were married couples living together, 7.6% had a female householder with no husband present, 1.1% had a male householder with no wife present, and 55.4% were non-families. 48.9% of all households were made up of individuals, and 35.9% had someone living alone who was 65 years of age or older. The average household size was 1.70 and the average family size was 2.39.

The median age in the city was 63.8 years. 11.5% of residents were under the age of 18; 5.2% were between the ages of 18 and 24; 9.6% were from 25 to 44; 25.1% were from 45 to 64; and 48.7% were 65 years of age or older. The gender makeup of the city was 43.6% male and 56.4% female.

The median income for a household in the city was $24,167, and the median income for a family was $27,917. Males had a median income of $16,563 versus $8,750 for females. The per capita income for the city was $17,162.

=== 2000 census ===
As of the census of 2000, there were 180 people, 103 households, and 52 families residing in the city. The population density was 301.7 inhabitants per square mile (116.5/km^{2}). There were 150 housing units at an average density of 251.4 per square mile (97.1/km^{2}). The racial makeup of the city was 96.11% White, 3.33% Native American, and 0.56% from two or more races. Hispanic or Latino of any race were 0.56% of the population.

There were 103 households, out of which 9.7% had children under the age of 18 living with them, 42.7% were married couples living together, 6.8% had a female householder with no husband present, and 49.5% were non-families. 48.5% of all households were made up of individuals, and 35.9% had someone living alone who was 65 years of age or older. The average household size was 1.75 and the average family size was 2.46.

In the city, the population was spread out, with 11.7% under the age of 18, 3.9% from 18 to 24, 11.7% from 25 to 44, 24.4% from 45 to 64, and 48.3% who were 65 years of age or older. The median age was 64 years. For every 100 females, there were 85.6 males. For every 100 females age 18 and over, there were 76.7 males.

The median income for a household in the city was $26,818, and the median income for a family was $39,583. Males had a median income of $20,625 versus $16,250 for females. The per capita income for the city was $26,524. None of the families and 5.3% of the population were living below the poverty line, including no under eighteens and 6.2% of those over 64.

== Notable person ==
- Levi LaVallee — American snowmobile racer
