= Ideal Corners, Minnesota =

Unincorporated community in Minnesota, United States

Ideal Corners
- Unincorporated community
- Location within Minnesota Location within the United States
- Coordinates: 46°39′38″N 94°11′54″W
- Country: United States
- State: Minnesota
- County: Crow Wing
- Township: Ideal Township
- Elevation: 1,243 ft (379 m)
- Time zone: UTC-6 (Central (CST))
  - Summer (DST): UTC-5 (CDT)
- ZIP code: 56472
- Area code: 218
- GNIS feature ID: 645336

Ideal Corners is an unincorporated community in Ideal Township, Crow Wing County, Minnesota, United States, near Pequot Lakes. It is along County Road 16 near County Road 39.
