= Capture of painted turtles =

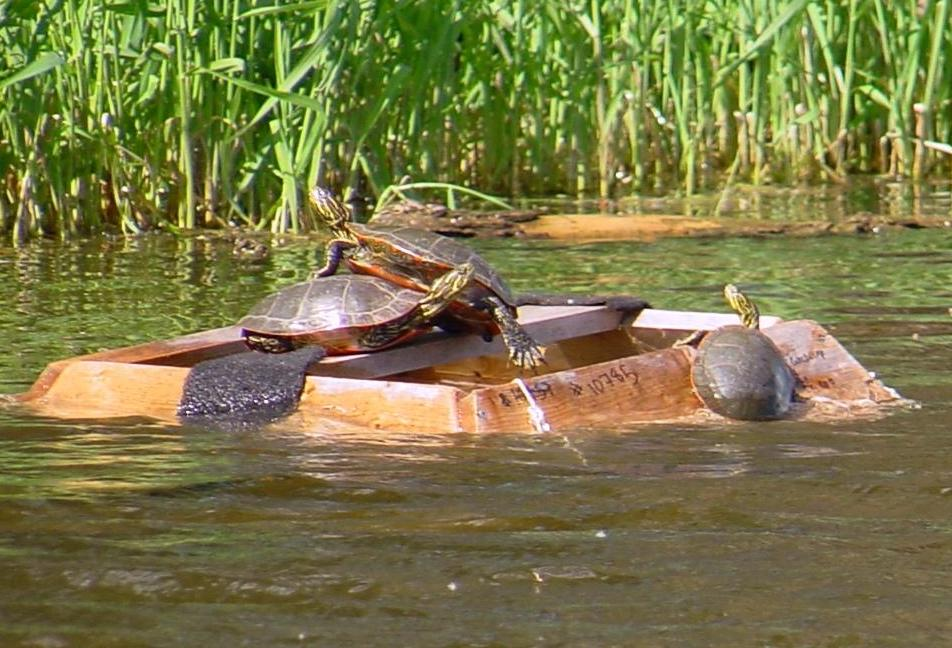
A basking trap in Minnesota.

The abundant painted turtle species, Chrysemys picta, is captured from the wild, primarily for pet use. Commercial harvesting is a small-scale industry that faces growing restrictions, but still occurs, in some cases unconstrained. Recreational harvesting is generally allowed in much of the species' range. However, it is prohibited in areas where the species is threatened and in a few non-threatened locations. Generally, turtles are captured by live trapping. Floating basking-style traps work better than staked, baited hoop-style traps, but both are employed. Because the turtles are long-lived, with lower replacement rates than typical game, concerns exist for over-harvesting. In this, they are similar to species such as snapping turtles, with late-aged sexual maturity, albeit not to the same extent.

== Commercial harvesting ==
Oregon conservation video: 0:30–0:60 conservation factors; 1:50–2:00 hoop trap.(If video play problematic, see or for alternative video streams.)

Commercial harvesting of painted turtle from the wild is controversial and, increasingly, restricted. Worldwide, many turtle species are endangered and turtle trapping has been implicated as a cause. Since turtles are slow to sexually mature and are long-lived, they generally have poor replacement rates when hunted.

Wisconsin formerly had virtually unrestricted trapping of painted turtles, but in 1997, based on qualitative observations, forbid all commercial harvesting. "Based on what I have seen over the years, I believe that turtle densities are way down," said Wisconsin state herpetologist Robert Hay.

In 1999, Minnesota, prompted by the Wisconsin decision and the growth of painted turtle capture in the 1990s, commissioned quantitative study of the state's painted turtles. After a two-year study, Gamble and Simon found a clear pattern of harvested lakes having half the painted turtle density of off-limits lakes. They also modeled the painted turtles' replacement rate and suggested that unrestricted harvest put the populations in danger of dropping strongly. In 2002, Minnesota forbid new harvesters and limited trap numbers, although harvest did continue by old harvesters. From 2002 to 2005, the most recent recorded, the yearly Minnesota painted turtles harvests were half the average size of that in the 1990s.

As of 2009, painted turtles faced virtually unlimited harvesting in Arkansas, Iowa, Missouri, Ohio, and Oklahoma. Since then, Missouri disallowed the harvest.

Pet usage is the primary market for trapped painted turtles although a small number are sent to turtle races. Commercial trapping is modest economically, with double digits of trappers, selling a few thousand turtles yearly, at $1–2 per turtle. Individual harvesters who trap painted turtles typically do so for extra money and alternate between fishing and turtle trapping based on the markets. Many have been traditionally involved in the trade: Ben Hedstrom of Minnesota said, "We've sold turtles for 50 years. My dad did it since the 1920s." Some harvesters disagree with limiting the catch. Rex Campbell of Minnesota said, "I can go out and catch more turtles today than I did 10 years ago. I don't see that it's hurting the turtle population. The last thing I want to see is the end of the resource we've all depended on for a long time. I'm not against regulating the industry, but we want to go out and harvest and still make a living at it."

== Recreational harvesting ==
Many US state fish and game departments allow recreational taking of painted turtles with differing restrictions. Alabama allows a creel limit of ten, of each of the three subspecies (southern, midland, and eastern) found there, for personal use, but also has a special license for commercial turtle catchers, dealers and farmers. Virginia allows a creel limit of five with a fishing license. Michigan allows open-season taking of one per day, for non-commercial use. Pennsylvania allows one capture per day, from water, with a fishing license of each of the subspecies present there: eastern and midland. New Hampshire confines taking to the summer. Arizona allows taking four per year with a hunting license.

Some localities completely protect the painted turtles. Oregon, where its western painted turtle populations are under pressure, forbids taking of any kind. Missouri forbids the taking of either subspecies (western or southern) present there. Also, in Canada, Ontario and British Columbia restrict any taking of painted turtles.

== Methods ==
For commercial harvesting, collectors use either basking traps or hoop traps. The basking trap is a floating enclosures with sloping sides and a basking surface. Turtles are able to climb up the sloping sides onto the basking surface, but then when they jump off into the center, they can't get back out. Hoop traps are cylindrical mesh traps with a funnel opening. Hoop traps are submerged and turtles are attracted by bait. In Minnesota, trappers say that they prefer basking traps to target painted turtles and hoop traps for "meat" turtles (snapping turtles and softshell turtles). Minnesota harvest records also show a clear pattern of most painted turtles coming from basking traps and most softshell and snapping turtles from hoop traps. Three quantitative studies of basking traps also show they are more efficient than baited hoop traps for trapping painted turtles. Despite the many hours of night and cloudiness when the basking traps do not lure turtles, the painted turtle's drive to bask is so powerful, that on a per-day basis, these traps are twice as effective. Or, possibly, the basking traps are more effective since painted turtles frequently escape back out the funnel of hoop traps.

Recreational (and commercial) capturing methods are regulated by locality. In addition to traps, set lines are used, as are nets and hand capture. Traps must generally be floating or partially submerged so captured turtles can breathe; trap size, number, construction, and labeling may also be regulated. Several states describe a practice of wanton shooting of turtles "for fun" (two studies of this have been done) and prohibit it, or prohibit even deliberate taking with firearms. Use of chemicals or explosives is also generally disallowed. Because other, less numerous, turtle species may be more heavily protected, methods of collection are restricted to allow the release of protected species.

== See also ==
- Wildlife trade
