= Fort Ripley, Minnesota =

City in Minnesota, United States

Fort Ripley
- City
- Location of the city of Fort Ripley within Crow Wing County, Minnesota
- Coordinates: 46°10′08″N 94°21′47″W
- Country: United States
- State: Minnesota
- County: Crow Wing
- Named for: Eleazer W. Ripley

Area
  - Total: 1.41 sq mi (3.64 km^{2})
  - Land: 1.29 sq mi (3.34 km^{2})
  - Water: 0.12 sq mi (0.30 km^{2})
- Elevation: 1,165 ft (355 m)

Population (2020)
  - Total: 84
  - Density: 65.1/sq mi (25.14/km^{2})
- Time zone: UTC-6 (Central (CST))
  - Summer (DST): UTC-5 (CDT)
- ZIP code: 56449
- Area code: 218
- FIPS code: 27-21932
- GNIS feature ID: 2394797

Fort Ripley is a city in Crow Wing County, Minnesota, United States, near the confluence of the Mississippi and Nokasippi Rivers. As of the 2020 census, Fort Ripley had a population of 84. It is part of the Brainerd Micropolitan Statistical Area.

== History ==
Fort Ripley was a United States military installation beginning in 1849 and lasting until 1877. The fort, now a small part of Camp Ripley, was on the opposite side of the Mississippi River from Morrison County as the current city in Crow Wing County.

The city of Fort Ripley was incorporated in 1927. It took its name from the fort, which was named for Eleazer Wheelock Ripley, an American soldier and politician.

== Geography ==
According to the United States Census Bureau, the city has a total area of 1.44 square miles (3.73 km^{2}), of which 1.32 square miles (3.42 km^{2}) is land and 0.12 square miles (0.31 km^{2}) is water.

The city of Fort Ripley is geographically in Fort Ripley Township but is a separate entity.

Fort Ripley is between Little Falls and Brainerd along Minnesota State Highway 371 near Over the Hill Road and Crow Wing County Road 2. The Mississippi River, the Nokasippi River, and the Little Nokasippi River are all in the vicinity.

The boundary line between Crow Wing and Morrison counties is nearby.

== Demographics ==
Historical population
Census	Pop.	Note	%±
1930	105		—
1940	126		20.0%
1950	88		−30.2%
1960	55		−37.5%
1970	54		−1.8%
1980	83		53.7%
1990	92		10.8%
2000	74		−19.6%
2010	69		−6.8%
2020	84		21.7%
U.S. Decennial Census

=== 2010 census ===
As of the census of 2010, there were 69 people, 33 households, and 20 families living in the city. The population density was 52.3 inhabitants per square mile (20.2/km^{2}). There were 37 housing units at an average density of 28.0 per square mile (10.8/km^{2}). The racial makeup of the city was 97.1% White, 1.4% Native American, and 1.4% Asian.

There were 33 households, of which 21.2% had children under the age of 18 living with them, 54.5% were married couples living together, 3.0% had a female householder with no husband present, 3.0% had a male householder with no wife present, and 39.4% were non-families. 33.3% of all households were made up of individuals, and 9.1% had someone living alone who was 65 years of age or older. The average household size was 2.09 and the average family size was 2.70.

The median age in the city was 50.5 years. 17.4% of residents were under the age of 18; 0.0% were between the ages of 18 and 24; 26% were from 25 to 44; 39.1% were from 45 to 64; and 17.4% were 65 years of age or older. The gender makeup of the city was 53.6% male and 46.4% female.

=== 2000 census ===
As of the census of 2000, there were 74 people, 34 households, and 24 families living in the city. The population density was 55.6 inhabitants per square mile (21.5/km^{2}). There were 35 housing units at an average density of 26.3 per square mile (10.2/km^{2}). The racial makeup of the city was 94.59% White, 1.35% Native American, 1.35% from other races, and 2.70% from two or more races. Hispanic or Latino of any race were 4.05% of the population.

There were 34 households, out of which 11.8% had children under the age of 18 living with them, 61.8% were married couples living together, 2.9% had a female householder with no husband present, and 29.4% were non-families. 23.5% of all households were made up of individuals, and 5.9% had someone living alone who was 65 years of age or older. The average household size was 2.18 and the average family size was 2.46.

In the city, the population was spread out, with 9.5% under the age of 18, 8.1% from 18 to 24, 25.7% from 25 to 44, 44.6% from 45 to 64, and 12.2% who were 65 years of age or older. The median age was 48 years. For every 100 females, there were 124.2 males. For every 100 females age 18 and over, there were 123.3 males.

The median income for a household in the city was $37,250, and the median income for a family was $40,750. Males had a median income of $33,542 versus $26,250 for females. The per capita income for the city was $18,559. There were 11.1% of families and 6.8% of the population living below the poverty line, including no under eighteens and none of those over 64.

== Education ==
Fort Ripley's students attend Brainerd Public Schools. The zoned high school is Brainerd High School.
