= XVG =

XVG may refer to:

- The file format used by data visualization software Grace
- The code of Longville Municipal Airport
- XV Gymnasium, a high school in Zagreb, Croatia
