= Jenkins, Minnesota =

City in Minnesota, United States

Jenkins
- City
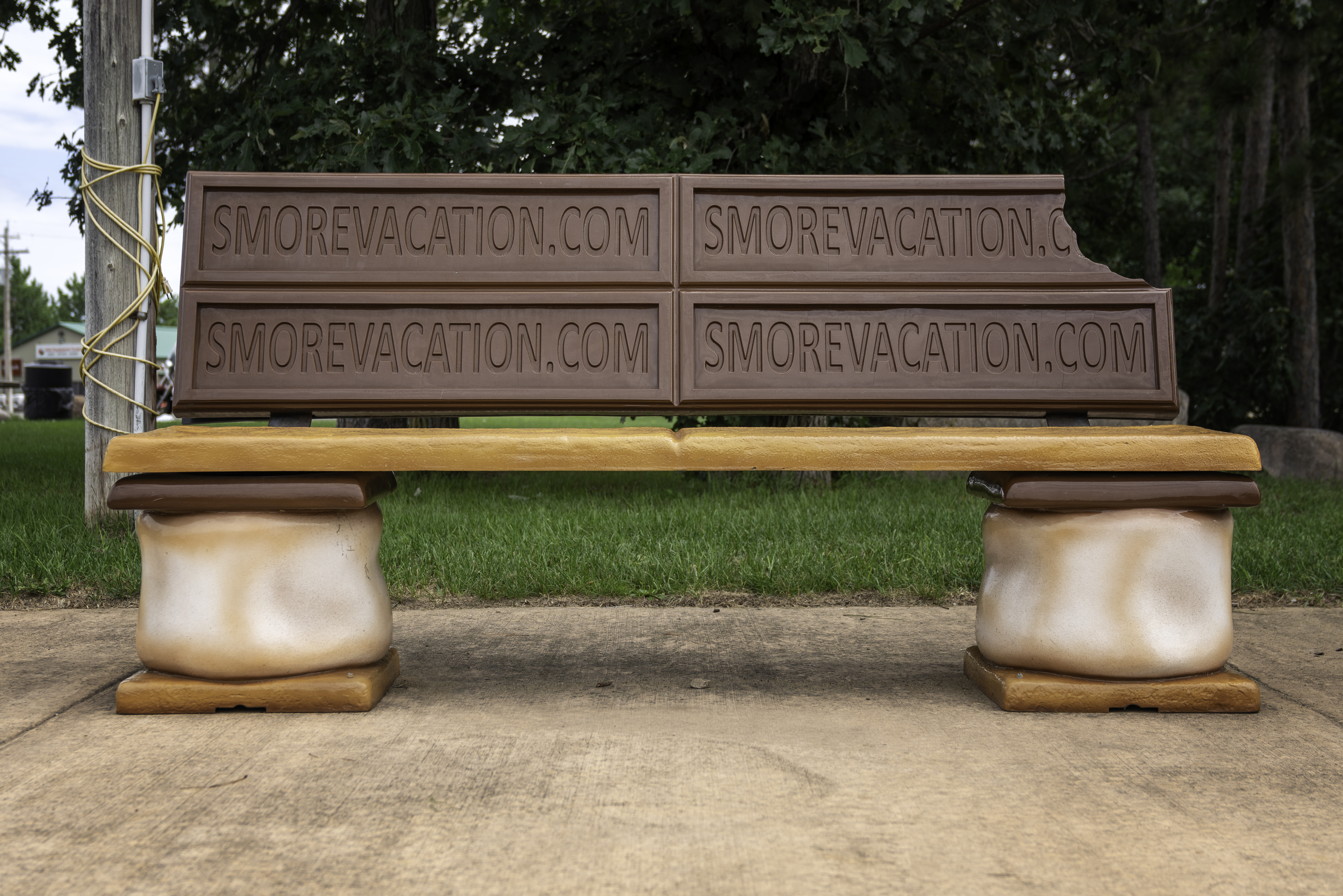
- Smore bench in Jenkins

- Location of Jenkins within Crow Wing County, Minnesota
- Coordinates: 46°38′53″N 94°19′27″W
- Country: United States
- State: Minnesota
- County: Crow Wing

Area
  - Total: 4.50 sq mi (11.66 km^{2})
  - Land: 4.47 sq mi (11.58 km^{2})
  - Water: 0.027 sq mi (0.07 km^{2})
- Elevation: 1,266 ft (386 m)

Population (2020)
  - Total: 490
  - Density: 110/sq mi (42.3/km^{2})
- Time zone: UTC-6 (Central (CST))
  - Summer (DST): UTC-5 (CDT)
- ZIP codes: 56456, 56472
- Area code: 218
- FIPS code: 27-31832
- GNIS feature ID: 2395464
- Website: https://cityofjenkins.com/

Jenkins is a city in Crow Wing County, Minnesota, United States. The population was 490 at the 2020 census. It is part of the Brainerd Micropolitan Statistical Area.

== History ==
A post office called Jenkins has been in operation since 1895. The city was named for George W. Jenkins, a local lumberman. Jenkins was incorporated as a village in 1904 and as a city in 1969.

== Geography ==
According to the United States Census Bureau, the city has a total area of 4.51 square miles (11.68 km^{2}), of which 4.48 square miles (11.60 km^{2}) is land and 0.03 square miles (0.08 km^{2}) is water. Jenkins is located in the northwest part of Crow Wing County. Jenkins is a gateway to the nearby Whitefish Chain of Lakes.

Minnesota State Highway 371 serves as a main route in the community. Other routes include County Roads 15, 16, and 145.

Jenkins is part of the Brainerd Lakes Area.

== Demographics ==
Historical population
| Census | Pop. | Note | %± |
|---|---|---|---|
| 1910 | 130 | | — |
| 1920 | 125 | | −3.8% |
| 1930 | 148 | | 18.4% |
| 1940 | 206 | | 39.2% |
| 1950 | 170 | | −17.5% |
| 1960 | 144 | | −15.3% |
| 1970 | 148 | | 2.8% |
| 1980 | 219 | | 48.0% |
| 1990 | 262 | | 19.6% |
| 2000 | 287 | | 9.5% |
| 2010 | 430 | | 49.8% |
| 2020 | 490 | | 14.0% |
U.S. Decennial Census

=== 2010 census ===
As of the census of 2010, there were 430 people, 168 households, and 101 families living in the city. The population density was 96.0 inhabitants per square mile (37.1/km^{2}). There were 193 housing units at an average density of 43.1 per square mile (16.6/km^{2}). The racial makeup of the city was 99.3% White, 0.5% Native American, and 0.2% from other races. Hispanic or Latino of any race were 3.0% of the population.

There were 168 households, of which 34.5% had children under the age of 18 living with them, 43.5% were married couples living together, 9.5% had a female householder with no husband present, 7.1% had a male householder with no wife present, and 39.9% were non-families. 33.3% of all households were made up of individuals, and 9% had someone living alone who was 65 years of age or older. The average household size was 2.56 and the average family size was 3.26.

The median age in the city was 31.8 years. 29.3% of residents were under the age of 18; 7.4% were between the ages of 18 and 24; 30.2% were from 25 to 44; 23.3% were from 45 to 64; and 9.8% were 65 years of age or older. The gender makeup of the city was 53.7% male and 46.3% female.

=== 2000 census ===
As of the census of 2000, there were 287 people, 113 households, and 72 families living in the city. The population density was 67.5 inhabitants per square mile (26.1/km^{2}). There were 123 housing units at an average density of 28.9 per square mile (11.2/km^{2}). The racial makeup of the city was 97.91% White, 0.70% Native American, 0.35% Asian, and 1.05% from two or more races.

There were 113 households, out of which 32.7% had children under the age of 18 living with them, 47.8% were married couples living together, 10.6% had a female householder with no husband present, and 35.4% were non-families. 31.0% of all households were made up of individuals, and 8.8% had someone living alone who was 65 years of age or older. The average household size was 2.54 and the average family size was 3.15.

In the city, the population was spread out, with 27.2% under the age of 18, 6.6% from 18 to 24, 32.8% from 25 to 44, 22.0% from 45 to 64, and 11.5% who were 65 years of age or older. The median age was 37 years. For every 100 females, there were 103.5 males. For every 100 females age 18 and over, there were 93.5 males.

The median income for a household in the city was $34,167, and the median income for a family was $41,250. Males had a median income of $25,938 versus $17,232 for females. The per capita income for the city was $14,198. About 6.1% of families and 10.1% of the population were below the poverty line, including 13.4% of those under the age of eighteen and 21.7% of those 65 or over.

== Education ==
Pequot Lakes Public Schools is the public school district. Pequot Lakes High School is the district's high school.
