= Nokasippi River =

River in Minnesota, United States

Coordinates: 46°10′39″N 94°21′53″W

The Nokasippi River is a 46.5-mile-long (74.8 km) tributary of the Mississippi River in central Minnesota in the United States. In the Ojibwe language, the river is called Nooke-ziibi ("Tender River"). The term "tender" generally refers to the Bear Totem, but in this case refers to Chief Nokay, who was named after the Bear Totem and lived along the shores of Nokay Lake.

== Course ==
The Nokasippi flows for its entire course in southern Crow Wing County. It begins at the north end of Clearwater Lake, about 13 miles (21 km) east-northeast of Brainerd, and flows generally southwestwardly, passing through Eagle, Nokay, Heron, South Long and Pond lakes. It joins the Mississippi River from the east just north of the town of Fort Ripley and across the Mississippi from the Camp Ripley Military Reservation. Just upstream of its mouth, the Nokasippi collects a short tributary, the Little Nokasippi River.

== See also ==
- List of rivers of Minnesota
