= Merrifield, Minnesota =

Unincorporated community in Minnesota, US

Merrifield
- Census-designated place (CDP) and Unincorporated community
- Location within Minnesota
- Coordinates: 46°27′54″N 94°10′22″W
- Country: United States
- State: Minnesota
- County: Crow Wing
- Township: Lake Edward Township

Area
  - Total: 0.54 sq mi (1.41 km^{2})
  - Land: 0.54 sq mi (1.41 km^{2})
  - Water: 0 sq mi (0.00 km^{2})
- Elevation: 1,221 ft (372 m)

Population (2020)
  - Total: 140
  - Density: 257.9/sq mi (99.59/km^{2})
- Time zone: UTC-6 (Central (CST))
  - Summer (DST): UTC-5 (CDT)
- ZIP code: 56465
- Area code: 218
- GNIS feature ID: 647778

Merrifield is an unincorporated community and census-designated place (CDP) in Lake Edward Township, Crow Wing County, Minnesota, United States, near Brainerd. It is along Crow Wing County Road 3 near County Road 127. As of the 2020 census, Merrifield had a population of 140.

== Demographics ==
Historical population
| Census | Pop. | Note | %± |
|---|---|---|---|
| 2020 | 140 | | — |
U.S. Decennial Census

== History ==
A post office called Merrifield has been in operation since 1899. The community was named for the original owner of the town site.

== Education ==
It is in Brainerd Public Schools. The zoned high school is Brainerd High School.
