= Woman Lake =

Lake in the state of Minnesota, United States

- A Common Loon in the setting sun on Woman Lake

- Location within Minnesota Location within the United States
- Location: Cass County, Minnesota
- Coordinates: 46°57′07″N 094°16′34″W
- Basin countries: United States
- Surface area: 5,516 acres (22.32 km^{2})
- Max. depth: 67 ft (20 m)
- Surface elevation: 1,322 feet (403 m)
- Islands: Horseshoe Island
- Settlements: Longville

Woman Lake is a 5,516 acres (22.32 km^{2}) lake in Cass County, Minnesota, United States. The lake is part of a four-lake chain called the Woman Lake Chain; the other lakes in the chain are Child Lake, Girl Lake, and Little Woman Lake. Woman Lake is by far the largest and most visited lake within the Woman Lake Chain. There is a navigable channel between Girl Lake and Woman Lake, and the Boy River can be navigated upstream from Woman Lake to access Little Woman Lake as well as Child Lake. Navigating the Boy River does require boaters to be careful with their boat's lower unit and a motor that can be trimmed up is recommended.

The lake has one public access located on its western shore off Cass county road 5. There are two other public accesses within the Woman Lake Chain of lakes (One on Girl Lake in Longville, and an unpaved access in Child Lake). The town of Longville, Minnesota can be accessed by boat via Girl Lake. The lake is well known for its walleye, northern pike, perch, smallmouth bass, and muskie fishing.

The lake is stocked by the Minnesota Department of Natural Resources.

Woman Lake was named in commemoration of Ojibwe women who were killed there in a battle against the Sioux.

== Fishing ==
Woman lake has always been known for its walleye fishing. The lake also has a very good population of yellow perch, northern pike, largemouth bass and smallmouth bass, bluegill, crappie, and muskellunge. The lake has excellent water clarity, which makes fishing for the light-sensitive walleye difficult during the daytime. The lake is infested with the non-native exotic rusty crayfish and Zebra Mussels.

== Community ==
In recent years, Woman Lake, like many other lakes in Minnesota, has seen growth in its real estate market. There are currently 7 resorts on Woman Lake plus additional resorts located on Girl Lake, within the Woman Lake Chain of Lakes. Woman Lake resorts include Kee Nee Moo Sha (located on western side of Woman Lake), Broadwater Lodge (located in Broadwater Bay), Woman Lake Lodge (located in Bungey Bay), Green Roof Lodge (located in Bungey Bay), Minne-Teepee Resort (located in Bungey Bay), Evergreen Lodge (located on Woman Lake's southern shore), and All Seasons Resort (located in Hunter's Bay).

== Controversy ==
A percentage of Woman Lake adult walleyes attempt to spawn each spring upriver in the Boy River (The Boy River runs through the Woman Lake Chain of lakes). The Minnesota DNR has annually trapped these walleyes each April to mix the female eggs and male sperm to create stocking fry and fingerlings for other area lakes (the adult spawning walleyes are returned to Woman Lake). Some of the walleye fry is returned to Woman Lake to essentially stock itself. Since this is done after the eggs hatch into fry, the DNR reports that a higher percentage of fry survive than had they hatched naturally in the river, and therefore the net result is the same for Woman Lake while providing stocking options for other area lakes. Some local anglers dispute the percentages and insist Woman Lake walleye numbers are adversely impacted by this annual stocking operation.
