= Minnesota Highway 371 Bridge =

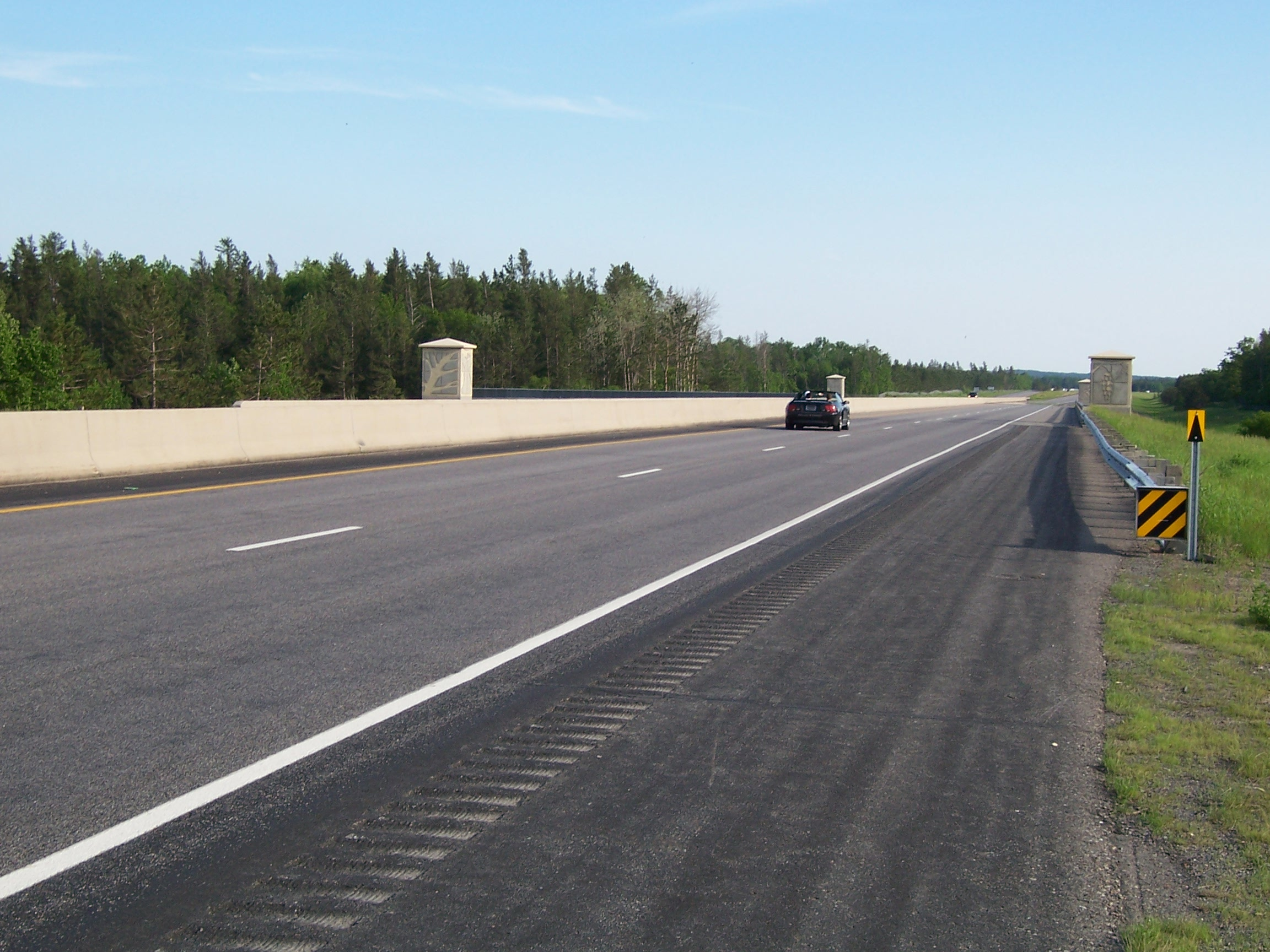
- Coordinates: 46°18′46″N 94°16′3″W
- Carries: MN 371
- Crosses: Mississippi River
- Locale: Baxter, Minnesota
- ID number: NBI 18004

Characteristics
- Design: Concrete Girder
- Total length: 532 feet (162 m)
- Width: 83 feet (25 m)
- Longest span: 140 feet (43 m)
- Clearance below: 52 feet (16 m)

Statistics
- Daily traffic: 8,900

The Minnesota Highway 371 Bridge is a 4-lane bridge carrying Minnesota State Highway 371 over the Mississippi River in the town of Baxter. It opened in 2000 as part of the Hwy. 371 bypass of Brainerd.

== See also ==
- List of crossings of the Upper Mississippi River
