= Brainerd Public Schools =

School district in Minnesota, United States

District information
- Type: Public school (government funded)
- Superintendent: Laine Larson
- Schools: Brainerd High School; Forestview Middle School; Baxter Elementary School; Garfield Elementary School; Harrison Elementary School; Lowell Elementary School; Nisswa Elementary School; Riverside Elementary School; Brainerd Community Education; Brainerd Learning Center; Lincoln Education Center

Other information
- Website: Brainerd Public Schools

Brainerd Public Schools (BPS), also known as ISD 181, is a school district headquartered in Brainerd, Minnesota.

In addition to Brainerd it serves Baxter, Fort Ripley, Garrison, Merrifield, and most of Nisswa.

== History ==
Jerry Walseth became the superintendent circa 2000.

The Minnesota Association of School Administrators gave Walseth the Administrator of Excellence Award.

In 2008 a referendum for school funding failed, and as a result the district closed two schools.

Laine Larson became the superintendent in 2016. In 2021 the Minnesota Association of School Administrators gave her the Kay E. Jacobs Memorial Award.

== Schools ==
High school

- Brainerd High School

Middle school

- Forestview Middle School

Elementary school

- Baxter Elementary School
- Garfield Elementary School
- Harrison Elementary School
- Lowell Elementary School
- Nisswa Elementary School
- Riverside Elementary School

Other

- Brainerd Community Education
- Brainerd Learning Center
- Lincoln Education Center

=== Former schools ===
- Whittier Elementary School - In 2008 its enrollment was below 140 and it was scheduled to close that year.
