= Pequot Lakes Public Schools =

School district in Minnesota, United States

Pequot Lakes Public Schools, also known as ISD 186, is a school district headquartered in Pequot Lakes, Minnesota.

In addition to Pequot Lakes its attendance area includes Breezy Point, Jenkins, most of Crosslake, a portion of Lake Shore, most of Pine River and a portion of Nisswa.

== History ==
Chris Lindholm became superintendent in 2013.

In 2021 Lindholm narrated a video called "The Rural Reveal" which he talked about socioeconomic issues. He apologized after the video had a negative reception. In May 2021 Lindholm took a position as superintendent of the Cook County School District, and the Pequot Lakes board accepted his resignation.

== Schools ==
- Pequot Lakes High School
- Pequot Lakes Middle School
- Eagle View Elementary School
- Early Childhood
