= Brainerd High School (Minnesota) =

Public high school in Brainerd, Minnesota

Coordinates: 46.3513900°N 94.2030600°W

- 702 5th Street South; Brainerd, Minnesota 56401; United States

Information
- Type: Public
- Motto: "The Warrior Way"
- School district: Brainerd Public Schools
- Principal: Dr. Kerrie Boser
- Staff: 89.28 (FTE)
- Grades: 9–12
- Student to teacher ratio: 20.53
- Colors: Blue and white
- Athletics conference: Central Lakes
- Mascot: Warrior
- Website: https://hs.isd181.org/

Brainerd High School is a public high school in Brainerd, Minnesota, United States. It serves grades 9–12 and is a part of Brainerd Public Schools. It was designed by Stegner, Hendrickson, & McNut.

In addition to Brainerd, the school also serves the communities of Baxter, Fort Ripley, Garrison, Merrifield, and most of Nisswa.

== History ==
Brainerd High School was established in 1889 as the demand for a second special school, and eventually, its replacement in Crow Wing County needed to be fulfilled.

While the intended use for the school was for children with special needs, in 2007 the school was expanded to help physically disabled children as well.

Brainerd High School (North and South campuses) are currently undergoing plans for major renovations, including a new fine arts auditorium connected to the North campus of the school. Improvements and renovations for many of the elementary schools and other schools in the region are also included in this referendum, which passed in spring 2018. Part of the referendum was including a performing arts center as an addition to the high school. On May 26, 2021, the performing arts center, named the "Gichi-ziibi Center for the Arts" which name is an Ojibwe translation of "big river" or "Mississippi River", had its grand opening.

== Notable alumni ==
- Nate Eiesland – musician, member of the band On An On
- Mike Schmitz – Catholic priest, public speaker, and podcaster

=== Athletes ===
- Nick Anderson – professional baseball player
- Josh Archibald – ice hockey player for the Edmonton Oilers in the National Hockey League
- Joe Haeg – football player for the Pittsburgh Steelers in the NFL, played college football at North Dakota State University
- Jon Jelacic – professional football player in NFL, CFL.
- Brock Larson – wrestler; retired mixed martial artist
- Todd Revenig – professional baseball player
- Whitey Skoog – basketball player, University of Minnesota and NBA Minneapolis Lakers
- Cole Smith – NHL player for the Vegas Golden Knights
- Nathaniel Staehling – college football linebacker for the Michigan Wolverines
- Dennis Stamp – professional wrestler
