= Crosslake, Minnesota =

City in Minnesota, United States

Crosslake
- City
- Location of Crosslake within Crow Wing County, Minnesota
- Coordinates: 46°40′35″N 94°06′25″W
- Country: United States
- State: Minnesota
- County: Crow Wing

Government
  - Mayor: David Nevin

Area
  - Total: 36.90 sq mi (95.58 km^{2})
  - Land: 25.76 sq mi (66.72 km^{2})
  - Water: 11.14 sq mi (28.86 km^{2})
- Elevation: 1,240 ft (380 m)

Population (2020)
  - Total: 2,394
  - Density: 92.9/sq mi (35.88/km^{2})
- Time zone: UTC-6 (Central (CST))
  - Summer (DST): UTC-5 (CDT)
- ZIP code: 56442
- Area code: 218
- FIPS code: 27-13978
- GNIS feature ID: 2393681
- Website: www.cityofcrosslake.gov

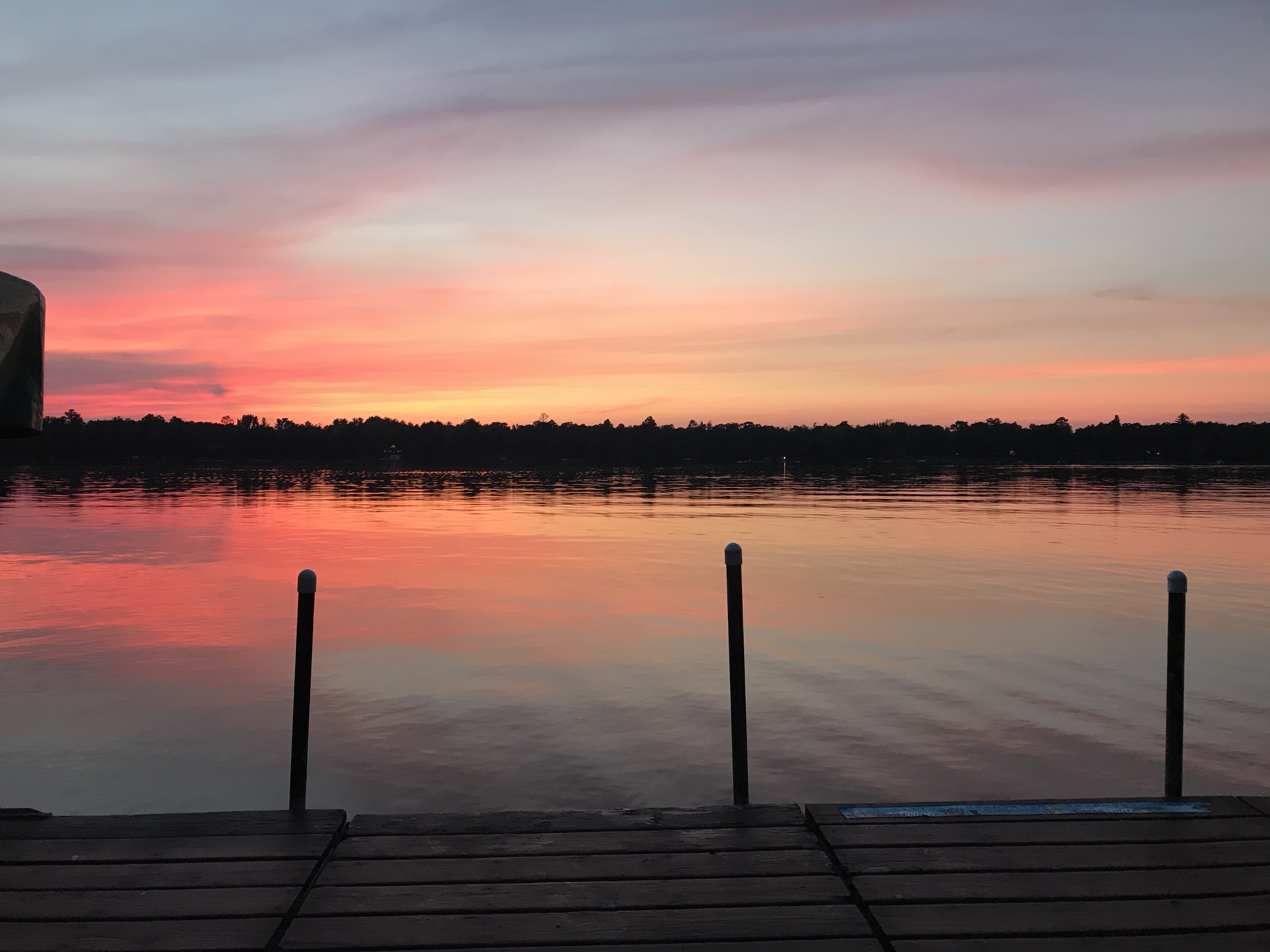
Sunset over Daggett Lake in Crosslake, MN.

Crosslake is a city in Crow Wing County, Minnesota, United States. The population was 2,394 at the 2020 census. It is part of the Brainerd Micropolitan Statistical Area.

== Geography ==
According to the United States Census Bureau, the city has an area of 36.89 square miles (95.54 km^{2}), of which 25.74 square miles (66.67 km^{2}) is land and 11.15 square miles (28.88 km^{2}) is water. Main routes include County Roads 3, 16, 36, 66, and 103.

Crosslake is part of the Brainerd Lakes Area, consisting of nearly 460 lakes within a 25-mile radius of Brainerd.

=== Climate ===
Climate data for Crosslake, Minnesota, 1991–2020 normals, extremes 1896–present
Month	Jan	Feb	Mar	Apr	May	Jun	Jul	Aug	Sep	Oct	Nov	Dec	Year
Record high °F (°C)	57 (14)	59 (15)	82 (28)	96 (36)	103 (39)	100 (38)	104 (40)	101 (38)	99 (37)	88 (31)	76 (24)	60 (16)	104 (40)
Mean maximum °F (°C)	40.3 (4.6)	44.1 (6.7)	60.0 (15.6)	74.3 (23.5)	84.1 (28.9)	89.0 (31.7)	90.6 (32.6)	89.2 (31.8)	85.0 (29.4)	76.8 (24.9)	57.5 (14.2)	41.7 (5.4)	92.7 (33.7)
Mean daily maximum °F (°C)	18.9 (−7.3)	24.8 (−4.0)	37.9 (3.3)	51.9 (11.1)	65.5 (18.6)	75.1 (23.9)	79.7 (26.5)	77.8 (25.4)	69.2 (20.7)	54.3 (12.4)	37.9 (3.3)	24.2 (−4.3)	51.4 (10.8)
Daily mean °F (°C)	9.1 (−12.7)	13.9 (−10.1)	27.2 (−2.7)	40.9 (4.9)	54.5 (12.5)	64.8 (18.2)	69.7 (20.9)	67.5 (19.7)	58.7 (14.8)	45.0 (7.2)	29.9 (−1.2)	16.2 (−8.8)	41.4 (5.2)
Mean daily minimum °F (°C)	−0.8 (−18.2)	3.0 (−16.1)	16.4 (−8.7)	29.8 (−1.2)	43.6 (6.4)	54.4 (12.4)	59.7 (15.4)	57.3 (14.1)	48.1 (8.9)	35.7 (2.1)	21.9 (−5.6)	8.1 (−13.3)	31.4 (−0.3)
Mean minimum °F (°C)	−23.5 (−30.8)	−19.3 (−28.5)	−8.0 (−22.2)	15.0 (−9.4)	30.1 (−1.1)	41.6 (5.3)	49.1 (9.5)	47.3 (8.5)	34.0 (1.1)	22.6 (−5.2)	4.6 (−15.2)	−15.3 (−26.3)	−26.2 (−32.3)
Record low °F (°C)	−53 (−47)	−51 (−46)	−41 (−41)	−8 (−22)	4 (−16)	24 (−4)	32 (0)	29 (−2)	17 (−8)	0 (−18)	−26 (−32)	−47 (−44)	−53 (−47)
Average precipitation inches (mm)	0.77 (20)	0.73 (19)	1.37 (35)	2.10 (53)	3.66 (93)	4.49 (114)	4.30 (109)	3.17 (81)	2.84 (72)	2.88 (73)	1.43 (36)	1.02 (26)	28.76 (731)
Average snowfall inches (cm)	7.3 (19)	8.0 (20)	5.9 (15)	3.0 (7.6)	0.1 (0.25)	0.0 (0.0)	0.0 (0.0)	0.0 (0.0)	0.0 (0.0)	1.0 (2.5)	4.1 (10)	9.8 (25)	39.2 (99.35)
Average precipitation days (≥ 0.01 in)	6.9	6.4	6.8	7.8	12.6	13.5	11.8	10.5	11.5	10.5	7.0	7.1	112.4
Average snowy days (≥ 0.1 in)	4.7	4.8	3.0	1.2	0.0	0.0	0.0	0.0	0.0	0.3	3.0	5.5	22.5
Source 1: NOAA
Source 2: National Weather Service

== History ==
The area of what is now Crosslake, Minnesota, gained traction in the late 1800s, after the 1885 construction of the Pine River Dam. Northern Minnesota's logging industry was flourishing at the time, attracting many of Crosslake's first residents.

The area was originally part of Watertown Township in Cass County. The township was annexed to Crow Wing County in 1887. In 1951, the township's southern half became Crosslake Village. In 1964, the remainder became North Crosslake Village. They became Crosslake Village in 1972 and the City of Crosslake in 1974.

== Demographics ==
Historical population
Census	Pop.	Note	%±
1960	165		—
1970	358		117.0%
1980	1,064		197.2%
1990	1,132		6.4%
2000	1,893		67.2%
2010	2,141		13.1%
2020	2,394		11.8%
U.S. Decennial Census

=== 2020 census ===
As of the 2020 census, Crosslake had a population of 2,394. The median age was 60.1 years. 13.8% of residents were under the age of 18 and 39.2% of residents were 65 years of age or older. For every 100 females there were 99.8 males, and for every 100 females age 18 and over there were 101.0 males age 18 and over.

0.0% of residents lived in urban areas, while 100.0% lived in rural areas.

There were 1,169 households in Crosslake, of which 14.8% had children under the age of 18 living in them. Of all households, 54.1% were married-couple households, 19.2% were households with a male householder and no spouse or partner present, and 20.5% were households with a female householder and no spouse or partner present. About 32.1% of all households were made up of individuals and 16.5% had someone living alone who was 65 years of age or older.

There were 3,013 housing units, of which 61.2% were vacant. The homeowner vacancy rate was 2.3% and the rental vacancy rate was 7.5%.

Racial composition as of the 2020 census
Race	Number	Percent
White	2,314	96.7%
Black or African American	7	0.3%
American Indian and Alaska Native	9	0.4%
Asian	0	0.0%
Native Hawaiian and Other Pacific Islander	1	0.0%
Some other race	10	0.4%
Two or more races	53	2.2%
Hispanic or Latino (of any race)	12	0.5%

=== 2010 census ===
As of the census of 2010, there were 2,141 people, 1,027 households, and 651 families living in the city. The population density was 83.2 inhabitants per square mile (32.1/km^{2}). There were 2,799 housing units at an average density of 108.7 per square mile (42.0/km^{2}). The racial makeup of the city was 98.5% White, 0.3% African American, 0.3% Native American, 0.1% Asian, 0.1% from other races, and 0.7% from two or more races. Hispanic or Latino of any race were 0.2% of the population.

There were 1,027 households, of which 17.1% had children under the age of 18 living with them, 56.9% were married couples living together, 3.6% had a female householder with no husband present, 2.9% had a male householder with no wife present, and 36.6% were non-families. 31.9% of all households were made up of individuals, and 16.6% had someone living alone who was 65 years of age or older. The average household size was 2.08 and the average family size was 2.59.

The median age in the city was 56.1 years. 16.1% of residents were under the age of 18; 3.3% were between the ages of 18 and 24; 15.7% were from 25 to 44; 30.9% were from 45 to 64; and 34% were 65 years of age or older. The gender makeup of the city was 49.9% male and 50.1% female.

=== 2000 census ===
As of the census of 2000, there were 1,893 people, 899 households, and 623 families living in the city. The population density was 73.8 inhabitants per square mile (28.5/km^{2}). There were 2,477 housing units at an average density of 96.6 per square mile (37.3/km^{2}). The racial makeup of the city was 99.52% White, 0.05% African American, 0.05% Native American, 0.05% Asian, 0.05% from other races, and 0.26% from two or more races. Hispanic or Latino of any race were 0.69% of the population. 29.6% were of German, 19.8% Norwegian, 15.9% Swedish, 5.8% English and 5.0% American ancestry according to Census 2000.

There were 899 households, out of which 15.9% had children under the age of 18 living with them, 64.0% were married couples living together, 3.3% had a female householder with no husband present, and 30.6% were non-families. 27.8% of all households were made up of individuals, and 12.3% had someone living alone who was 65 years of age or older. The average household size was 2.11 and the average family size was 2.52.

In the city, the population was spread out, with 14.7% under the age of 18, 3.1% from 18 to 24, 18.9% from 25 to 44, 32.0% from 45 to 64, and 31.4% who were 65 years of age or older. The median age was 56 years. For every 100 females, there were 102.0 males. For every 100 females age 18 and over, there were 100.9 males.

The median income for a household in the city was $41,125, and the median income for a family was $45,990. Males had a median income of $40,345 versus $23,636 for females. The per capita income for the city was $27,227. About 2.7% of families and 4.5% of the population were below the poverty line, including 7.5% of those under age 18 and 4.8% of those age 65 or over.

== Education ==
Most of Crosslake is in Pequot Lakes Public Schools. Parts are in the Crosby-Ironton Public School District and the Pine River-Backus Public School District. Pequot Lakes High School is the Pequot Lakes district's high school.

Crosslake also has a K-12 institution, Crosslake Community Schools.
