= Nisswa, Minnesota =

City in Minnesota, United States

Nisswa
- City
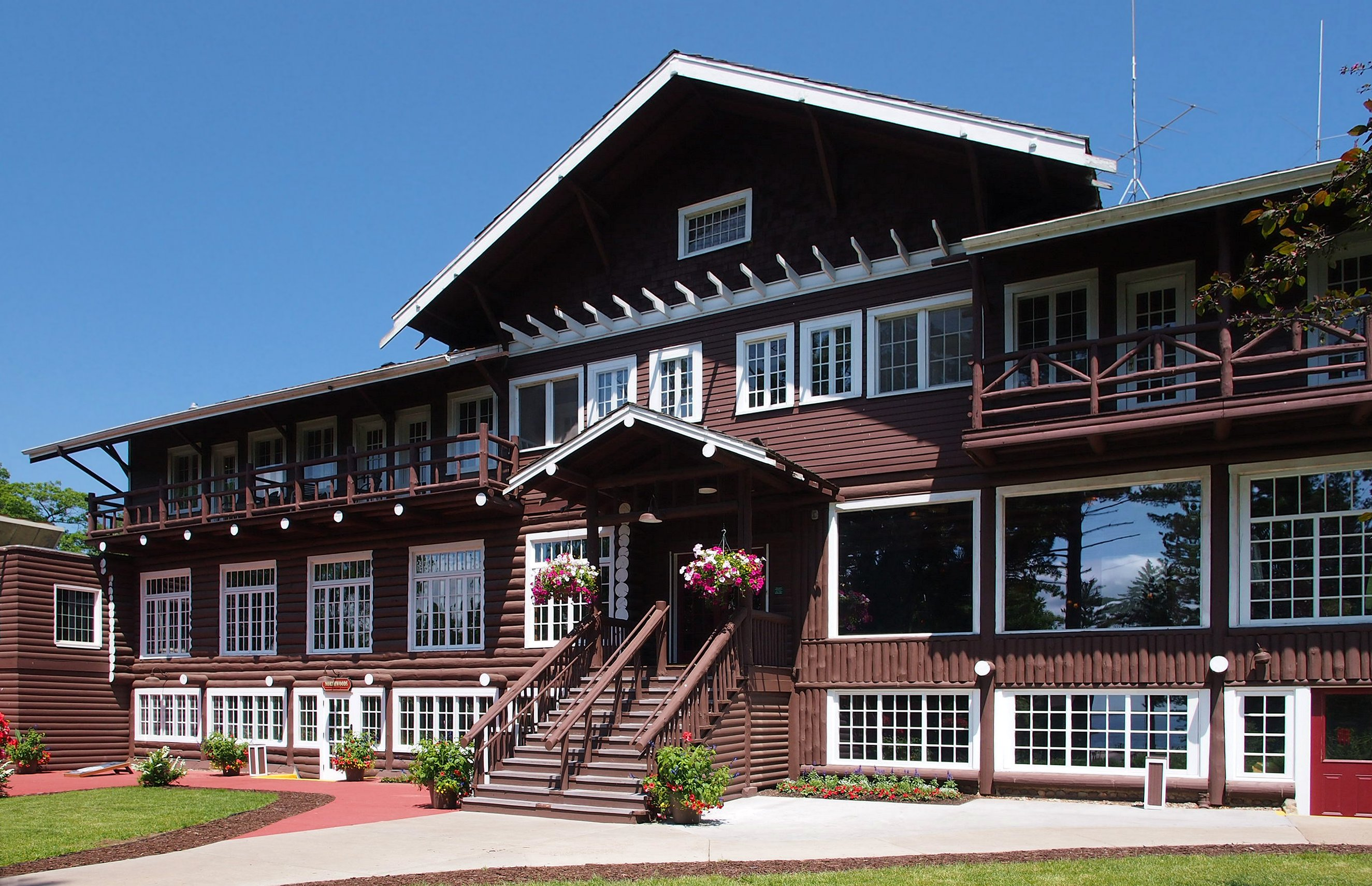
- Historic Grand View Lodge

- Location of Nisswa within Crow Wing County, Minnesota
- Coordinates: 46°29′25″N 94°17′51″W
- Country: United States
- State: Minnesota
- County: Crow Wing

Government
  - Mayor: Jennifer Carnahan (R)

Area
  - Total: 18.37 sq mi (47.57 km^{2})
  - Land: 10.77 sq mi (27.89 km^{2})
  - Water: 7.59 sq mi (19.67 km^{2})
- Elevation: 1,237 ft (377 m)

Population (2020)
  - Total: 1,967
  - Density: 182.6/sq mi (70.52/km^{2})
- Time zone: UTC-6 (Central (CST))
  - Summer (DST): UTC-5 (CDT)
- ZIP code: 56468
- Area code: 218
- FIPS code: 27-46348
- GNIS feature ID: 2395238
- Website: https://www.cityofnisswa.gov/

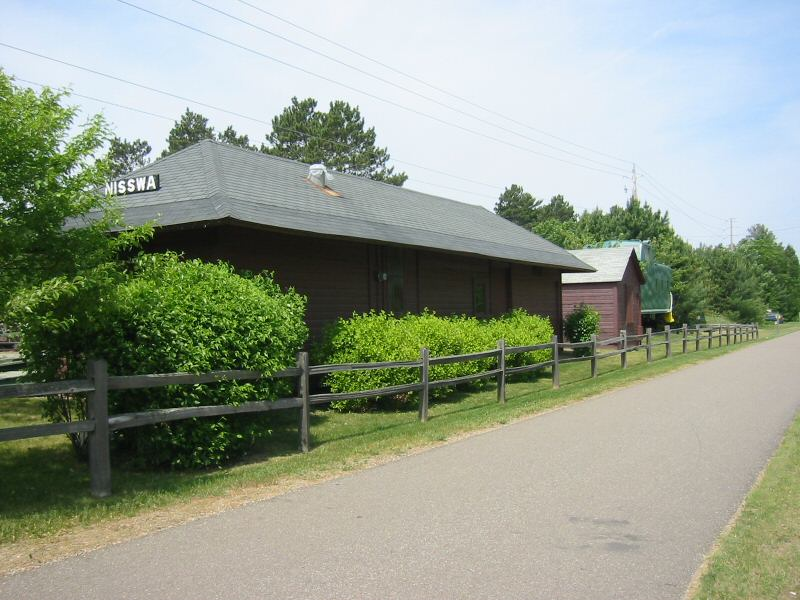
The former Northern Pacific Railway depot in Nisswa now serves as a historical museum. The railroad right-of-way is now the Paul Bunyan State Trail.

Nisswa (/ˈnɪswə/ NISS-wə) is a city in Crow Wing County, Minnesota, United States. The population was 1,967 at the 2020 census. Nisswa is part of the Brainerd Micropolitan Statistical Area, near Gull Lake.

== History ==
Smiley Township was founded in 1900, but local resident Leon Lum convinced residents to rename it Nisswa, from the Ojibwe word "nessawae" (which means "in the middle" or "three"), when the town was incorporated as a village in 1908. Nisswa became a municipality on December 4, 1946. Nisswa has become a popular tourist destination due to its shops, resorts, and lakes in close proximity. The Paul Bunyan State Trail, a rail trail, runs through Nisswa.

== Geography ==
According to the United States Census Bureau, the city has an area of 18.34 square miles (47.50 km^{2}), of which 10.78 square miles (27.92 km^{2}) is land and 7.56 square miles (19.58 km^{2}) is water.

Surrounded by lakes, Nisswa is part of the Brainerd Lakes Area. Some of these are Nisswa Lake, Roy Lake, Gull Lake, Lake Hubert, Clark Lake, Round Lake, and North Long Lake.

Minnesota Highway 371 serves as a main route in the city. Others include County Roads 13, 18, 77, and 115.

== Etymology ==
In 1908, when the village of Nisswa was incorporated, the name was changed to Nisswa from the Ojibwe word nessawae, which translates to "in the middle." In this case, in the middle refers to Nisswa being located between Clark, Nisswa, and Roy Lakes.

== Demographics ==
Historical population
Census	Pop.	Note	%±
1930	214		—
1940	400		86.9%
1950	578		44.5%
1960	742		28.4%
1970	1,011		36.3%
1980	1,407		39.2%
1990	1,391		−1.1%
2000	1,953		40.4%
2010	1,971		0.9%
2020	1,967		−0.2%
U.S. Decennial Census; 2013 Estimate

=== 2020 census ===
As of the 2020 census, Nisswa had a population of 1,967. The median age was 52.7 years. 17.4% of residents were under the age of 18 and 29.4% of residents were 65 years of age or older. For every 100 females there were 100.3 males, and for every 100 females age 18 and over there were 99.4 males age 18 and over.

0.0% of residents lived in urban areas, while 100.0% lived in rural areas.

There were 861 households in Nisswa, of which 21.5% had children under the age of 18 living in them. Of all households, 60.9% were married-couple households, 15.9% were households with a male householder and no spouse or partner present, and 18.2% were households with a female householder and no spouse or partner present. About 27.9% of all households were made up of individuals and 16.7% had someone living alone who was 65 years of age or older.

There were 1,573 housing units, of which 45.3% were vacant. The homeowner vacancy rate was 2.2% and the rental vacancy rate was 19.1%.

Racial composition as of the 2020 census
Race	Number	Percent
White	1,879	95.5%
Black or African American	6	0.3%
American Indian and Alaska Native	3	0.2%
Asian	8	0.4%
Native Hawaiian and Other Pacific Islander	1	0.1%
Some other race	9	0.5%
Two or more races	61	3.1%
Hispanic or Latino (of any race)	20	1.0%

=== 2010 census ===
As of the census of 2010, there were 1,971 people, 876 households, and 607 families living in the city. The population density was 182.8 inhabitants per square mile (70.6/km^{2}). There were 1,474 housing units at an average density of 136.7 per square mile (52.8/km^{2}). The racial makeup of the city was 97.7% White, 0.4% African American, 0.7% Native American, 0.6% Asian, 0.1% from other races, and 0.6% from two or more races. Hispanic or Latino of any race were 0.5% of the population.

There were 876 households, of which 22.1% had children under the age of 18 living with them, 61.8% were married couples living together, 5.1% had a female householder with no husband present, 2.4% had a male householder with no wife present, and 30.7% were non-families. 26.0% of all households were made up of individuals, and 12.4% had someone living alone who was 65 years of age or older. The average household size was 2.25 and the average family size was 2.69.

The median age in the city was 50.6 years. 18.2% of residents were under the age of 18; 5.6% were between the ages of 18 and 24; 17.2% were from 25 to 44; 34.7% were from 45 to 64; and 24.4% were 65 years of age or older. The gender makeup of the city was 49.6% male and 50.4% female.

=== 2000 census ===
As of the census of 2000, there were 1,953 people, 819 households, and 577 families living in the city. The population density was 179.5 inhabitants per square mile (69.3/km^{2}). There were 1,532 housing units at an average density of 140.8 per square mile (54.4/km^{2}). The racial makeup of the city was 98.87% White, 0.26% African American, 0.10% Native American, 0.15% Asian, 0.10% Pacific Islander, 0.10% from other races, and 0.41% from two or more races. Hispanic or Latino of any race were 0.41% of the population.

There were 819 households, of which 25.5% had children under the age of 18 living with them, 63.0% were married couples living together, 4.3% had a female householder with no husband present, and 29.5% were non-families. 24.3% of all households were made up of individuals, and 10.9% had someone living alone who was 65 years of age or older. The average household size was 2.37 and the average family size was 2.81.

In the city, the population was spread out, with 22.2% under the age of 18, 4.7% from 18 to 24, 25.9% from 25 to 44, 29.4% from 45 to 64, and 17.8% who were 65 years of age or older. The median age was 43. For every 100 females, there were 102.8 males. For every 100 females age 18 and over, there were 100.3 males.

The median income for a household in the city was $48,306, and the median income for a family was $54,931. Males had a median income of $37,772 versus $29,412 for females. The per capita income for the city was $26,265. About 2.7% of families and 4.9% of the population were below the poverty line, including 6.5% of those under age 18 and 5.8% of those 65 or older.

== Politics ==
Presidential election results

2020 Precinct Results Spreadsheet2016 Precinct Results Spreadsheet2012 Precinct Results Spreadsheet2008 Precinct Results Spreadsheet2004 Precinct Results Spreadsheet2000 Precinct Results Spreadsheet1996 Precinct Results1992 Precinct Results1988 Precinct Results1984 Precinct Results1980 Precinct Results1976 Precinct Results1968 Precinct Results1964 Precinct Results1960 Precinct Results
Year	Republican	Democratic	Third parties
2020	64.6% 968	34.1% 511	1.3% 19
2016	61.6% 811	32.8% 432	5.6% 73
2012	61.6% 783	36.9% 470	1.5% 19
2008	59.0% 767	40.0% 521	1.0% 13
2004	62.2% 783	36.5% 460	1.3% 16
2000	57.1% 630	35.9% 396	7.0% 77
1996	48.8% 455	39.3% 366	11.9% 111
1992	41.7% 402	32.3% 311	26.0% 250
1988	60.8% 545	39.2% 352	0.0% 0
1984	69.8% 520	30.2% 225	0.0% 0
1980	63.6% 554	30.3% 264	6.1% 53
1976	59.8% 444	36.8% 273	3.4% 25
1968	64.9% 366	30.7% 173	4.4% 25
1964	55.1% 258	44.9% 210	0.0% 0
1960	72.8% 316	26.5% 115	0.7% 3

== Events ==
Run for the Lakes Marathon

The Run for the Lakes Marathon is a 26.2 mile footrace that typically takes place in April. The race weekend also hosts a half marathon, a 10K, and a 5K.

Turtle Races

During the summer months, turtle races take place on a weekly basis. This has been an annual tradition in Nisswa since 1963.

== Education ==
Almost all of Nisswa's students are educated at Brainerd Public Schools. The rest attend Pequot Lakes Public Schools. The zoned high school for the Brainerd district is Brainerd High School while Pequot Lakes High School serves the Pequot Lakes district.

== Notable people ==
- Jennifer Carnahan, politician
- Adrianne Lenker, musician
