= Longville Municipal Airport =

- IATA: none; ICAO: KXVG; FAA LID: XVG

Summary
- Airport type: Public
- Owner: City of Longville
- Serves: Longville, Minnesota
- Elevation AMSL: 1,334 ft / 407 m
- Coordinates: 46°59′25″N 094°12′14″W

Map
- Location of airport in Minnesota/United States XVG (the United States)

Runways
Direction	Length		Surface
Direction	ft	m	Surface
13/31	3,781	1,152	Asphalt

Statistics (2005)
- Aircraft operations: 6,725
- Based aircraft: 8
- Sources: Minnesota DOT, FAA

Longville Municipal Airport (ICAO: KXVG, FAA LID: XVG) is a city-owned public-use airport located one nautical mile (1.85 km) northeast of the central business district of Longville, a city in Cass County, Minnesota, United States.

Although most U.S. airports use the same three-letter location identifier for the FAA and IATA, this airport is assigned XVG by the FAA but has no designation from the IATA.

== Facilities and aircraft ==
Longville Municipal Airport covers an area of 55 acres (22 ha) at an elevation of 1,334 feet (407 m) above mean sea level. It has one runway designated 13/31 with an asphalt surface measuring 3,781 by 75 feet (1,152 x 23 m).

For the 12-month period ending August 31, 2005, the airport had 6,725 aircraft operations, an average of 18 per day: 99.6% general aviation and 0.4% air taxi. At that time there were 8 aircraft based at this airport: 87.5% single-engine and 12.5% multi-engine.

== See also ==
- List of airports in Minnesota
