= Turtle racing =

American celbratory animal race

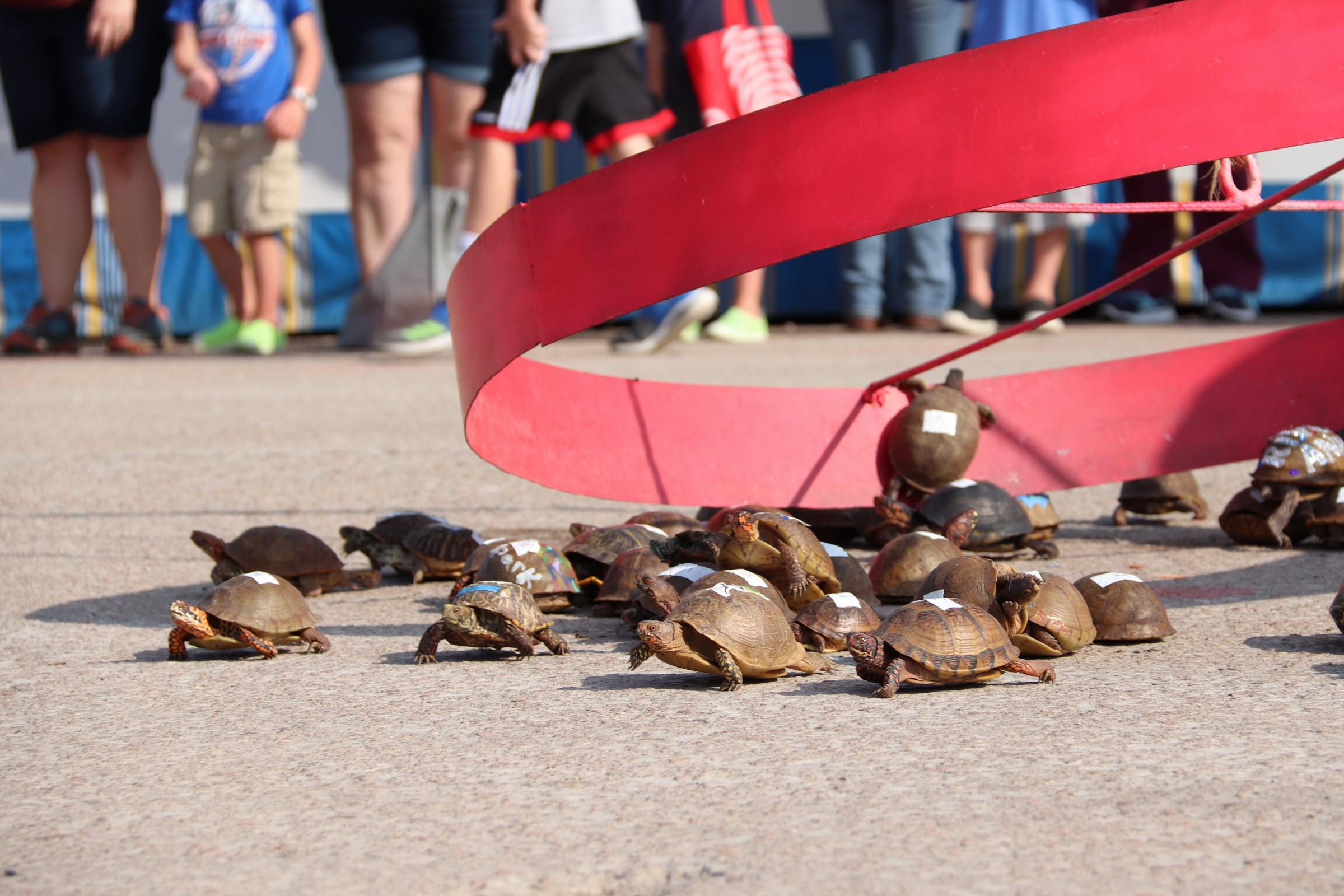
A turtle race in Oklahoma

Turtle racing is a traditional activity in rural America, typically held as part of a county fair, 4th of July celebration, or other festival.

It is primarily promoted as a children’s activity. Originating from a single event in Oklahoma in the 1920s, turtle races spread across the country and have become particularly popular in Kansas, Oklahoma, Missouri, Nebraska, and Minnesota.

Turtle races are considered a traditional activity and a source of civic pride in many small communities. However, most turtle races use wild caught turtles and do not have strong conservation and animal husbandry protocols, causing concern among conservationists and animal welfare advocates. Efforts have been made to create best practices that allow turtle races to exist harmoniously with the needs of the turtles.

== History ==
Various activities billed as “turtle races” have been held throughout history, though these were mostly one-off events that had no lasting cultural impact.

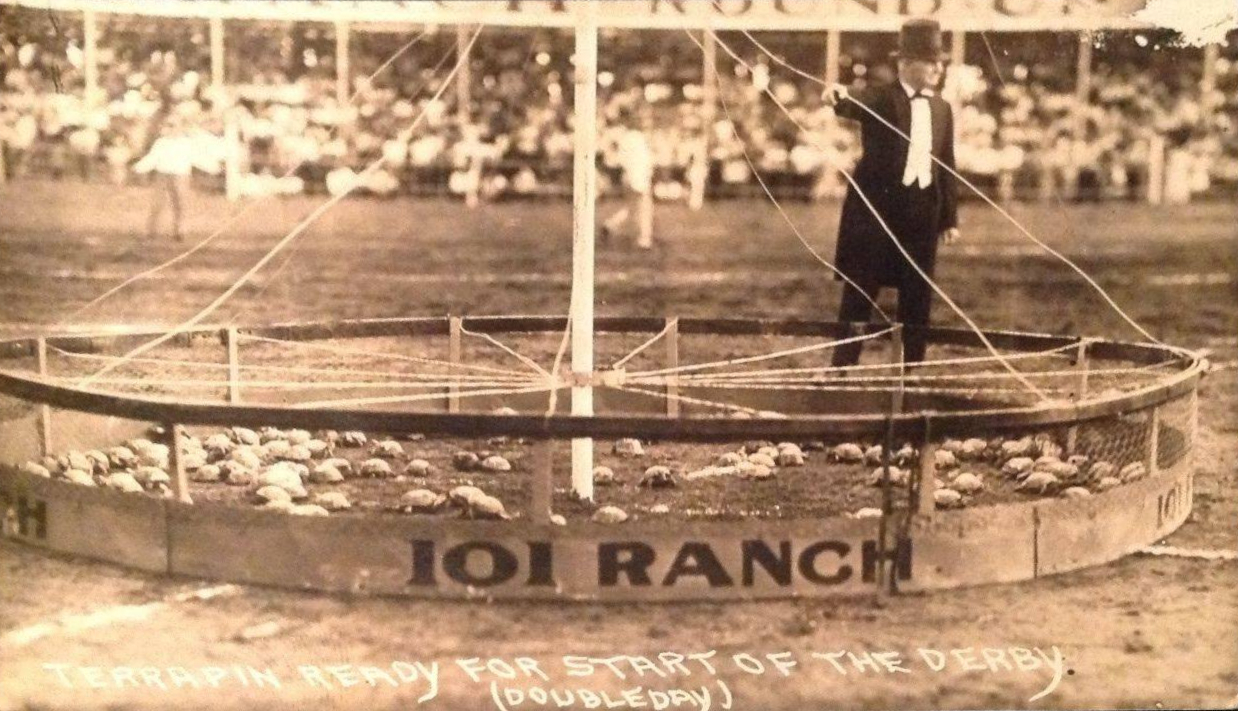
A "terrapin derby" at the 101 Ranch

The modern phenomenon was invented in 1924 by Joe Miller, a proprietor of the Miller Brothers 101 Ranch in Oklahoma, for the ranch’s labor day festivities. According to a biographer, “Joe came up with the novel event, dubbed the National Terrapin Derby - which soon became a nationwide fad - after watching small box turtles crawling around to escape the strong summer sun. For weeks, youngsters scoured the pastures and river bottoms for turtles, worth a dime each to the bounty hunters. They brought bushel baskets filled with turtles to the ranch roundup grounds, where each contestant paid a two-dollar entry fee, with one dollar going into the pot for the first-place winner and the rest to be split between second and third places.”

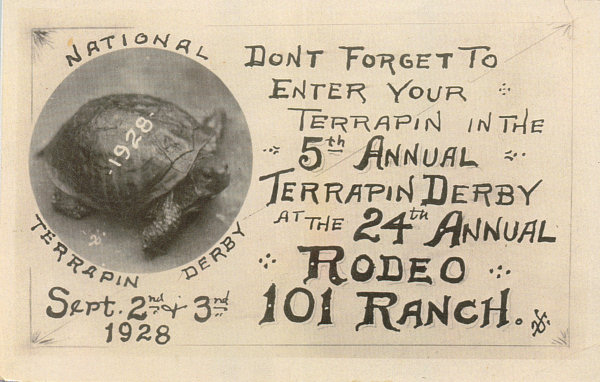
A flyer for the 101 Ranch "terrapin derby"

The first event at the 101 Ranch attracted 214 entrants, but grew considerably over the next few years. By 1930 there were 7,100 turtles entered. The event ceased in the early 1930s due to the effects of the Great Depression, and a ruling by the United States Postal Service that it was a gambling event that could not be advertised through the mail.

In the years following the first race, the event was widely copied and spread to other states.

Turtle racing gained popularity amongst the College of Staten Island students during the mid 1980s. Students gathered at Wave Street bar in Stapleton to gamble on the turtles. Gonna Fly Now from the Rocky soundtrack and the National Anthem were popular musical accompaniments to the races.

== Variations ==
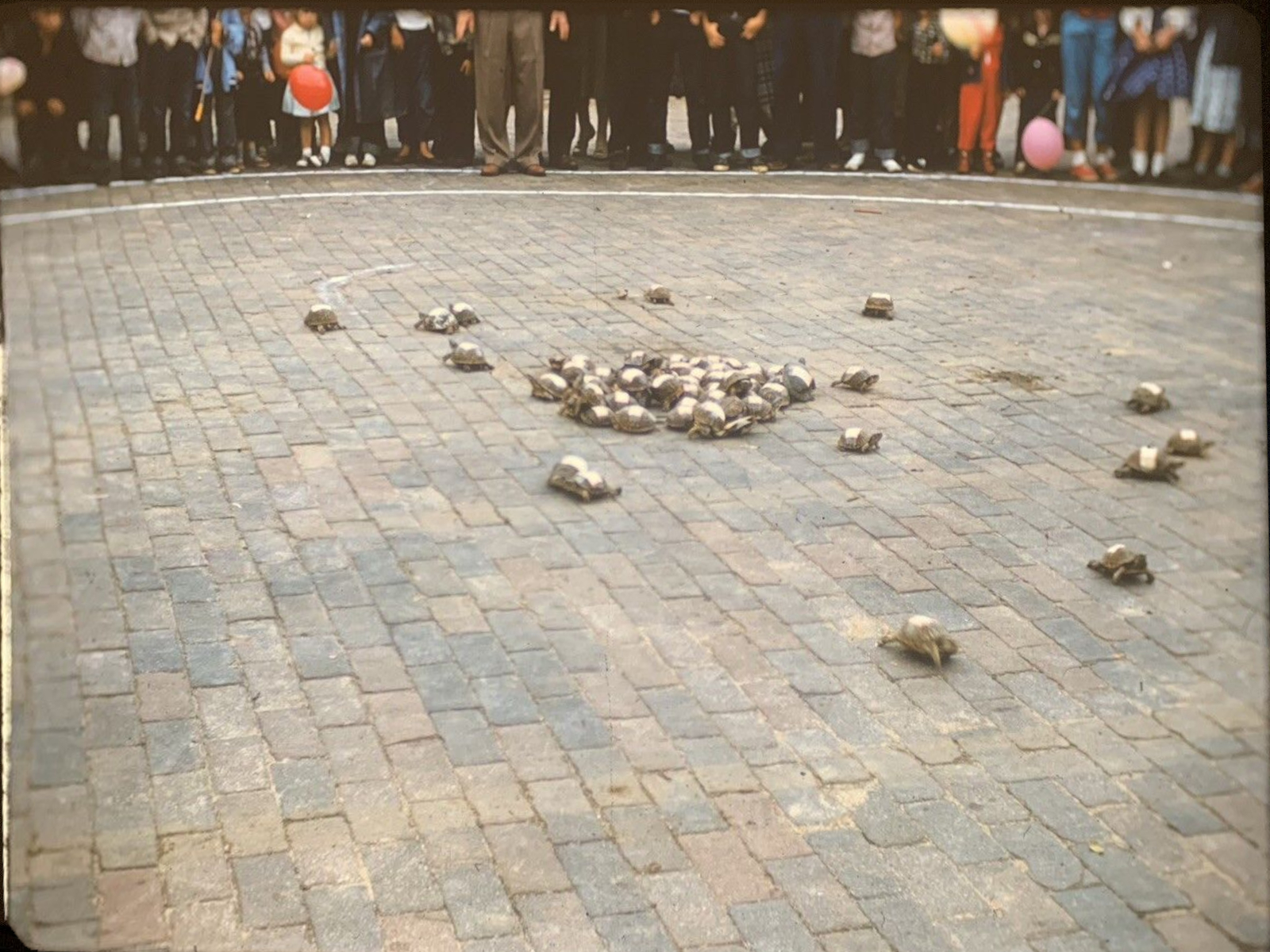
A turtle race in Kansas during the early 1960s

The 101 Ranch turtle race was conducted by placing turtles in the center of a large circle, inside an enclosure that could be lifted using a pulley system. Once the enclosure was lifted, the turtles wandered into the circle, with the first turtle to leave the circle being declared the winner. Most turtle races today still use a circle, and place the turtles under an upturned bucket or inside a cylinder, which is lifted to start the race.

A few turtle races have switched to using linear tracks. Others reverse the direction of the race, starting the turtles at the edge of the circle, and seeing which turtle is the first to the center.

While turtle races are primarily a festival attraction, a few bars in the United States have adopted the event for entertainment.

== Prevalence ==
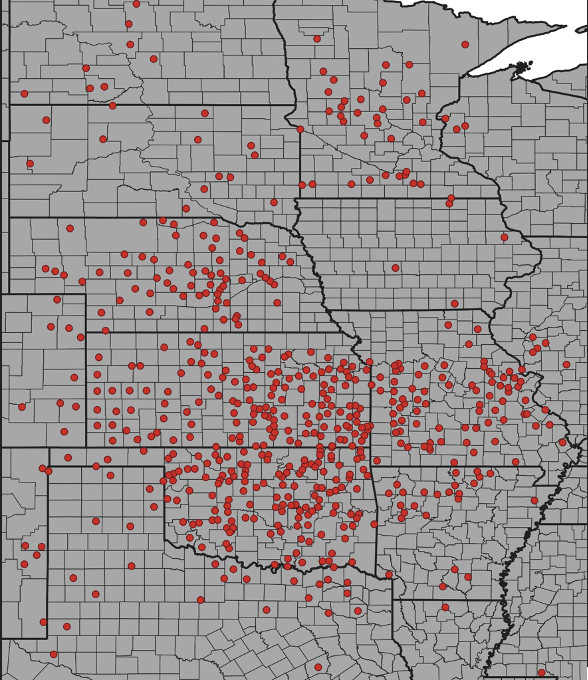
A map of turtle races in the Central United States

A 2024 study found that there were 615 annual turtle races that appeared to use wild turtles. Turtle races were especially popular in Kansas (141 races), Oklahoma (139 races), Missouri (78 races), Nebraska (64 races) and Minnesota (34 races). The 4th of July had a particularly large occurrence of turtle races, with 25% of the events being held that day.

The study counted a total of 10,466 turtles across 268 turtle races, of which 59% were North American Box Turtles and 20% were Painted turtles. The authors surmised these numbers were atypically low when the study was conducted, and would likely be much higher in a typical year. The vast majority of turtles were believed to be wild caught.

In Minnesota, the towns of Longville, Nisswa and Perham hold weekly turtle races during the summer, which have become significant tourist draws and can involve hundreds of visitors. The Minnesota Legislature has declared Longville to be the "Turtle Racing Capitol of the World."

=== 2024 Study ===
A 2024 study by the Turtle Conservation Group/Turtle Race Task Force found widespread husbandry and conservation deficiencies at turtle races across the country, including improper handling, overcrowding, racing under dangerously hot conditions, and lack of emphasis on returning territorial box turtles to their "home range." The study suggested that turtle races could become beneficial if they would follow best practices based on the North American Model of Wildlife Conservation.

=== Kansas ===
In 1925, a state legislator in Kansas unsuccessfully attempted to have turtle races outlawed. According to a contemporary newspaper account, “This state, now, is split on the mud turtle issue as the result of a rapidly growing movement to prohibit terrapin derbies on the ground of cruelty to animals. The movement has resulted from the increasing popularity of turtle marathons in the southwest in the last year.”

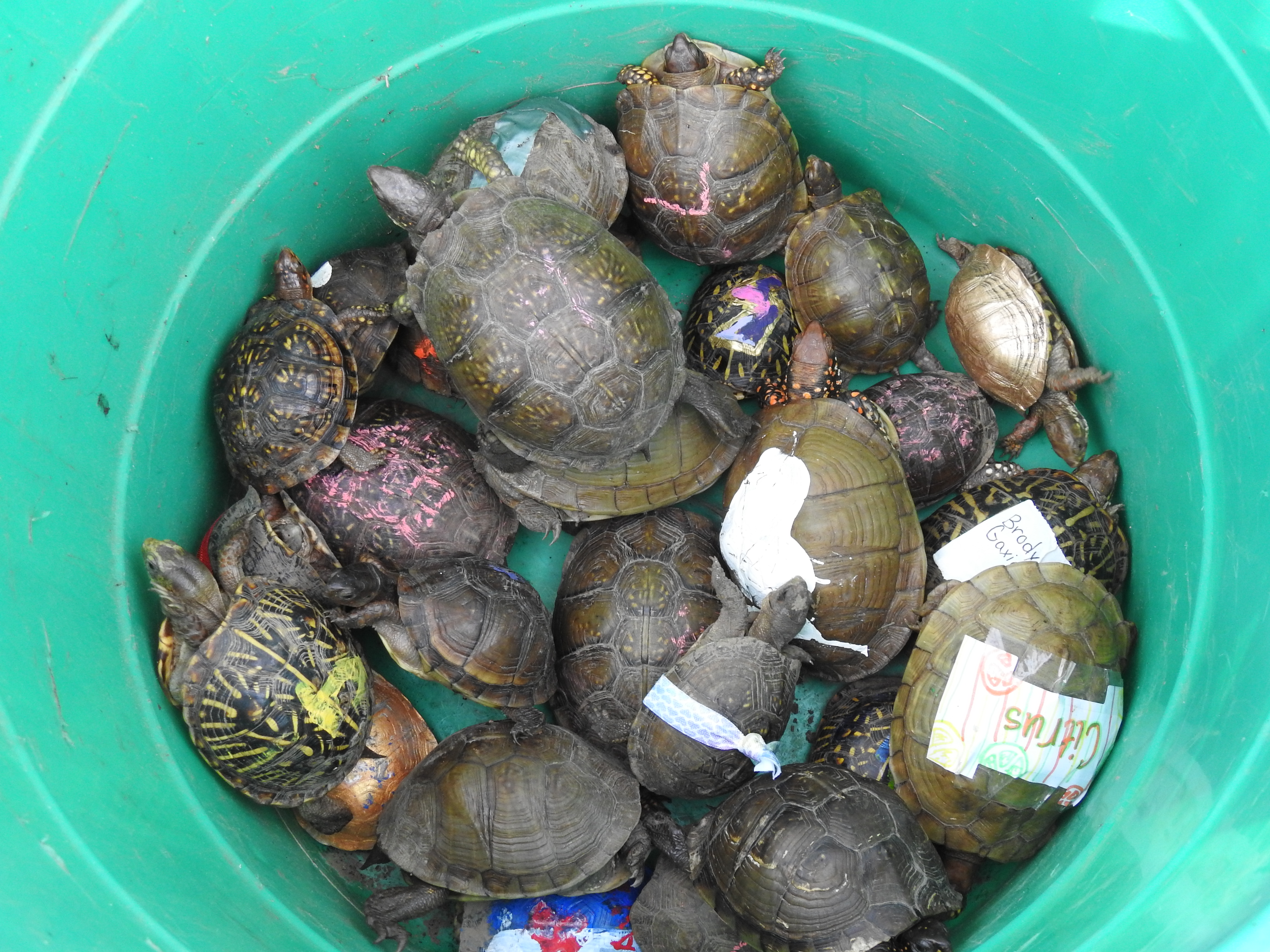
Overcrowded turtles during a turtle race in Checotah, Oklahoma

In 1998, Kansas citizen Sarah Reeb studied the issue, and documented that several dozen turtle races were ongoing in the state. She expressed concern about the treatment of Ornate Box Turtles, particularly the lack of husbandry, and a practice by the Wichita County Fair in Leoti, Kansas that involved racing turtles across excessively hot sand.

=== California ===
In 1969, 108 Desert tortoises - a protected species in California, which is today listed as critically endangered by the IUCN Red List - were confiscated by game wardens after being illegally captured for a turtle race in Joshua Tree. It was later reported that tortoises had been dropped an injured, and the solvent turpentine had been applied to a number of animals to make them run faster. The event switched to using wild caught box turtles (reportedly about 200) from Florida in the mid-1980s, leading to condemnation of the event by the California Turtle and Tortoise Club. The race is no longer held.

=== Florida ===
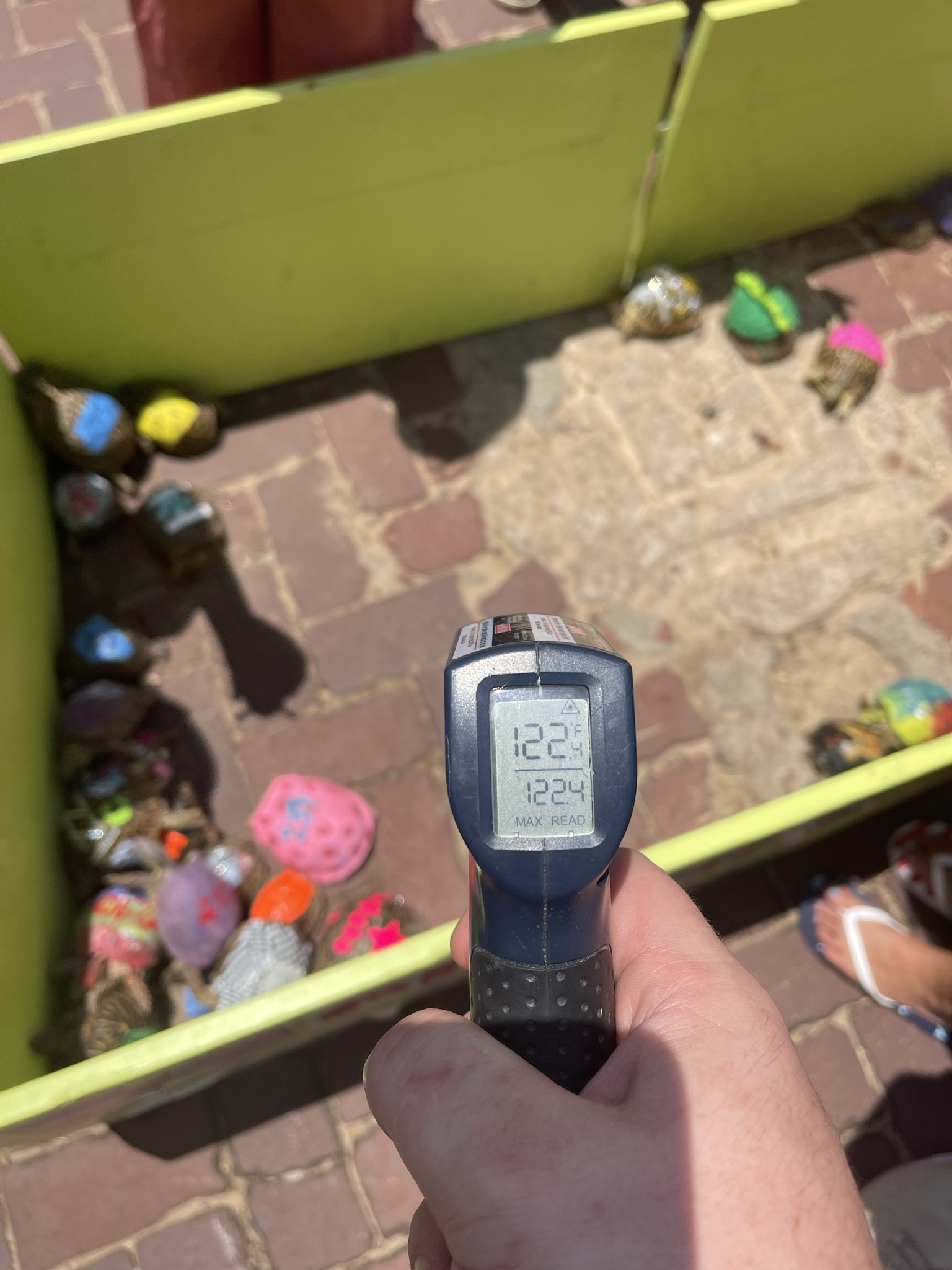
Turtles at the starting gate of a race in Clarendon, Texas under excessively hot conditions in 2021. In 2022, a temperature reading at the same race recorded the track at 140 degrees Fahrenheit

In 1979, a turtle race in Ft. Myers came under fire for treatment of Gopher tortoises. According to a report on the event, tortoises were captured up to seven months before the race and were "not provided with adequate food, water, or shelter." Organizers admitted to gassing the tortoises out of their burrows using a hose connected to a vehicle exhaust, and a third of the animals had wounds consistent with the use of a "gopher hook." Despite a provision in their permit requiring that foreign substances not be applied to the turtles' shells, 74% of tortoises entered had substances such as paint and epoxy on their shells.

The controversy resulted in the end of the event. All tortoise races in Florida were later discontinued after Gopher tortoises - who are currently listed as Vulnerable by the IUCN - became a protected species.

=== Illinois ===
In 2013, a long standing turtle race in Danville ended after the Illinois Department of Natural Resources promulgated new regulations prohibiting turtle races in areas where certain diseases had been detected. The race, which relied on mushroom hunters to collect about 100 Eastern box turtles annually, was also reported to significantly exceed the legal collection limit for box turtles.

=== Maryland ===
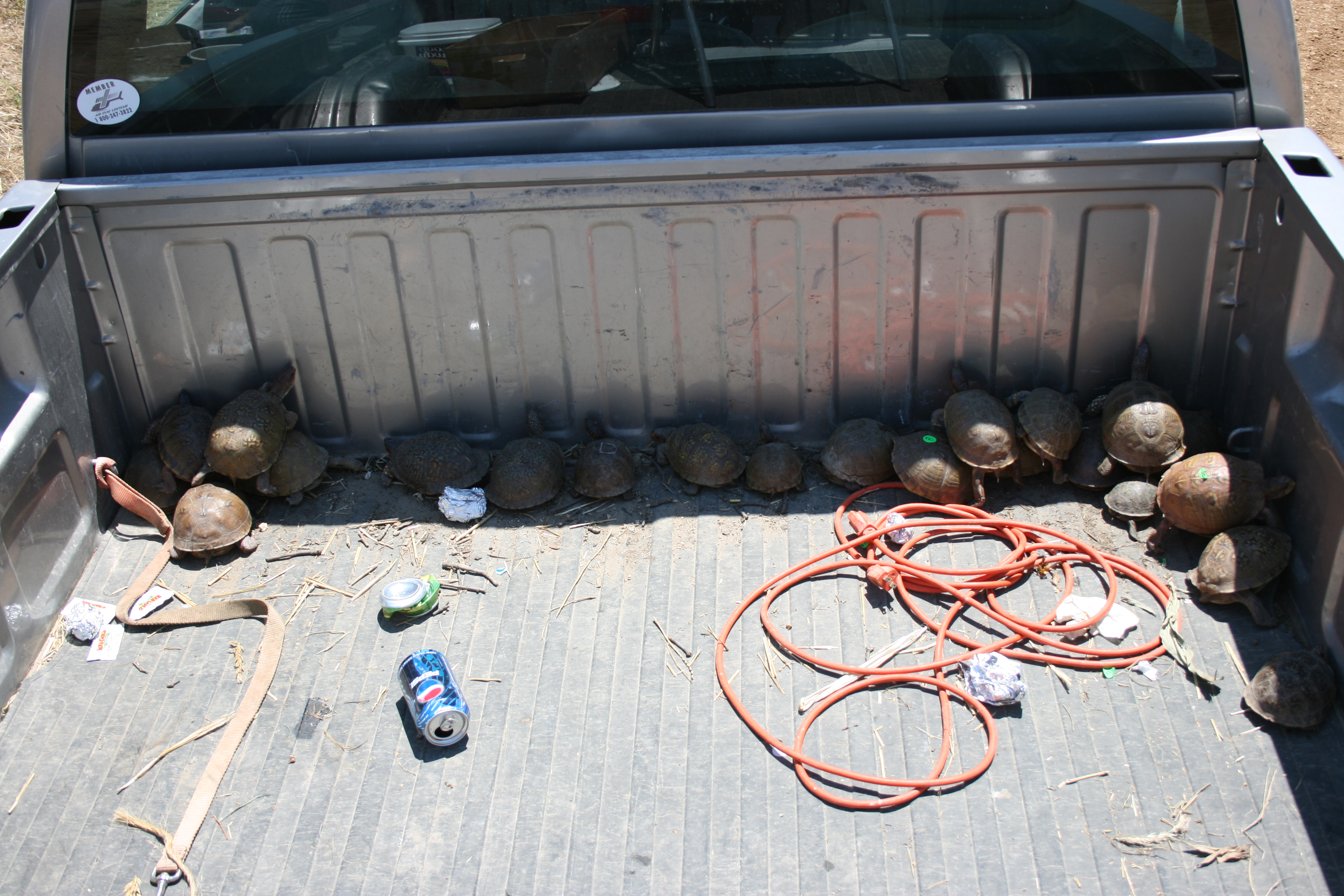
Following the Lincoln County turtle race in Troy, Missouri, abandoned box turtles scramble to find the only sliver of available shade

In 2013, wildlife groups began expressing concern about annual 4th of July turtle derby in Bel Air, citing concerns over the spread of disease and population impacts to turtles.

A survey of race participants found that 84% of Eastern box turtles entered in 2012 were wild caught specifically for the event. The Maryland Department of Natural Resources issued a statement encouraging people not to participate in the event and, after trying for several years to encourage the organizers to voluntarily cancel, passed regulations in 2016 that banned turtle races in the state of Maryland.

=== Arkansas ===
In 2019, the 4th of July turtle race in Harrison was cancelled after allegations of animal abuse. The event often involved hundreds of wild caught Three-toed box turtles. The sponsor, Arvest Bank, a multi-billion dollar company, did not assist with veterinary bills for dozens of sick and injured turtles from the event that were left with a local organization, Boone County Turtle Rescue and Rehabilitation.

=== Virginia ===
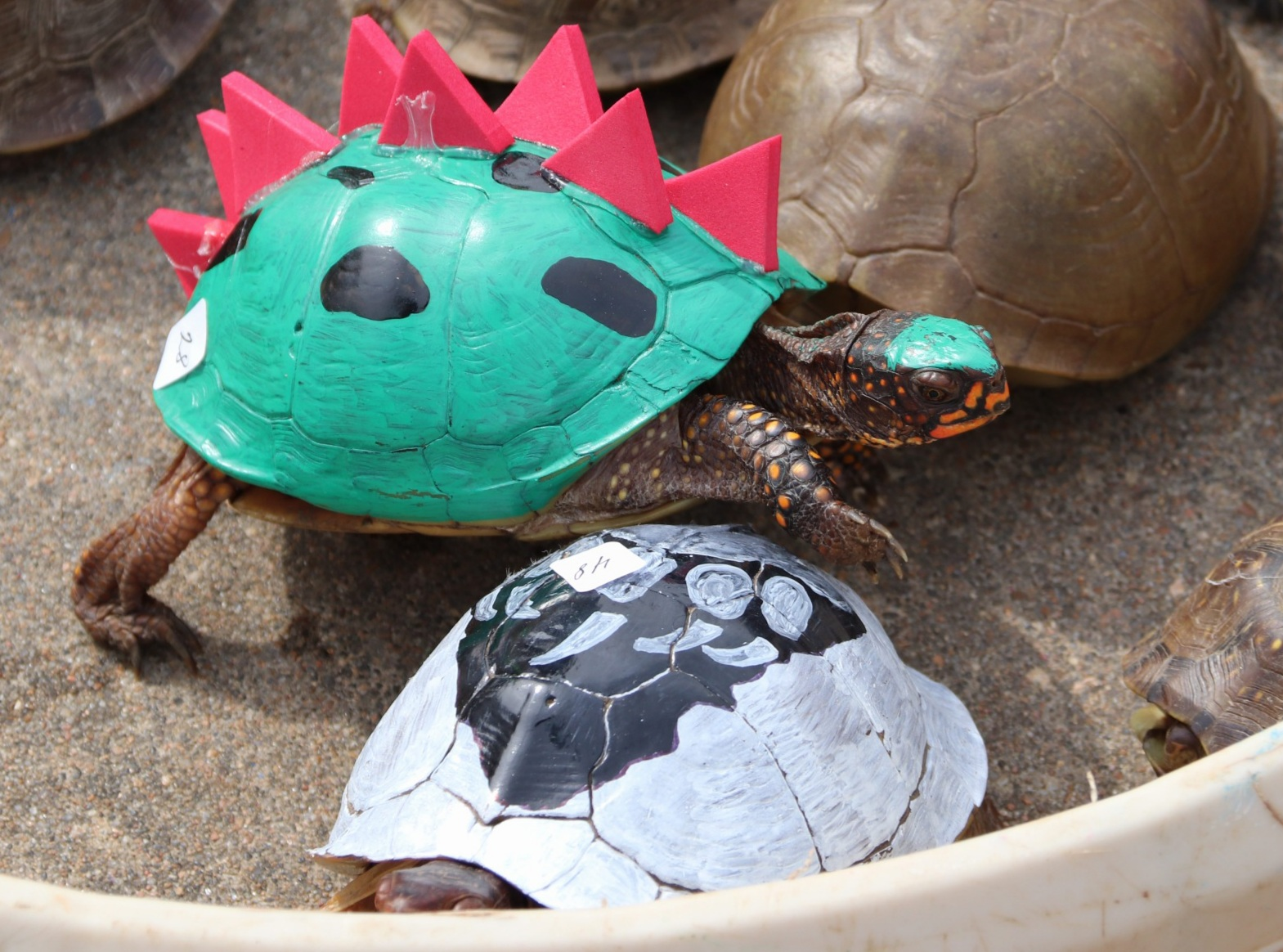
A box turtle at a race in Keota, Oklahoma with paint and decorations hot glued to its shell

In 2019, officials with the Virginia Department of Wildlife Resources criticized a turtle race in Clear Brook after several State Threatened Wood turtles were entered, and other wildlife laws were broken. The event was cancelled due to the controversy.

=== Minnesota ===
In 2021, YouTube channel Snake Discovery released a video criticizing the weekly turtle race in Perham, which they referred to as a "poorly-executed tradition." The video, which received nearly 700,000 views, expressed concern about the collection of wild turtles, improper handling, and a high mortality rate among the turtles that reportedly approached 50%, and made suggestions for a more sustainable event. Officials with Perham's Chamber of Commerce decided to continue with the race, but pledged to make changes.

== See also ==
- Frog jumping contest
- Rattlesnake round-up
