= Pequot Lakes, Minnesota =

City in Minnesota, United States

Pequot Lakes
- City
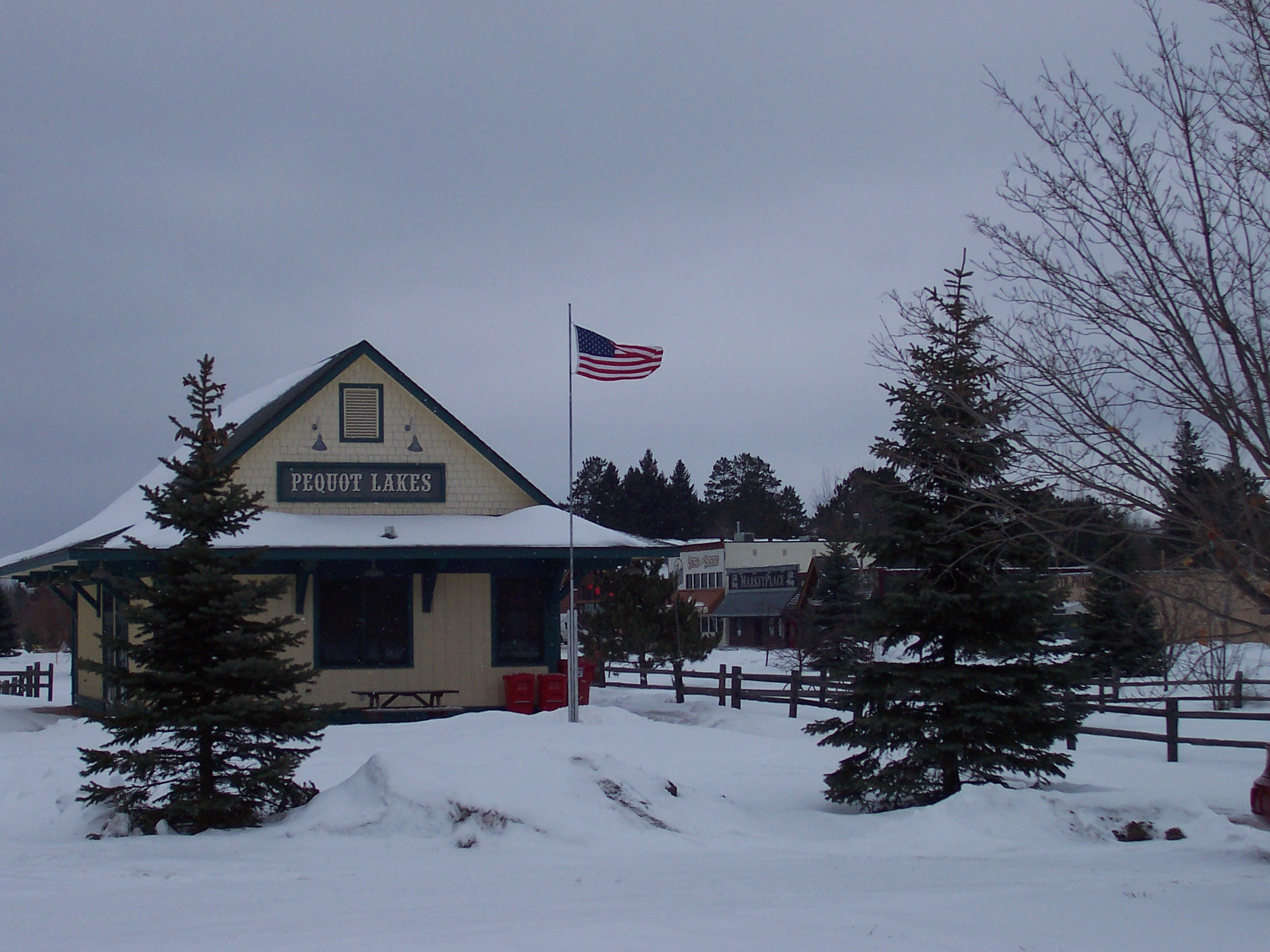
- Downtown Pequot Lakes

- Flag Logo

- Location of Pequot Lakes within Crow Wing County, Minnesota
- Coordinates: 46°36′14″N 94°17′50″W
- Country: United States
- State: Minnesota
- County: Crow Wing

Government
  - Mayor: Tyler Gardner

Area
  - Total: 18.17 sq mi (47.05 km^{2})
  - Land: 16.36 sq mi (42.38 km^{2})
  - Water: 1.80 sq mi (4.67 km^{2})
- Elevation: 1,276 ft (389 m)

Population (2020)
  - Total: 2,395
  - Density: 146.4/sq mi (56.51/km^{2})
- Time zone: UTC-6 (Central (CST))
  - Summer (DST): UTC-5 (CDT)
- ZIP code: 56472
- Area code: 218
- FIPS code: 27-50416
- GNIS feature ID: 2396180
- Website: www.pequotlakes-mn.gov

Pequot Lakes (/ˈpiːkwɑːt ˈleɪks/ PEE-kwaht LAYKS) is a city in Crow Wing County, Minnesota, United States. The population was 2,395 at the 2020 Census . It is part of the Brainerd micropolitan area.

== History ==
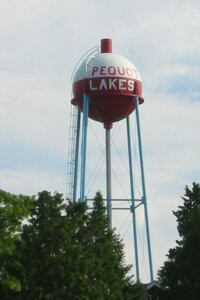
The water tower in Pequot Lakes is decorated like a fishing bobber.

Pequot Lakes was platted in March 1900. It was named by a postal official for the first Indian-sounding name he thought of, which is the name of a tribe of Algonquian Indians in eastern Connecticut. A post office was established at Pequot Lakes in 1896.

According to the Pequot Lakes Heritage Preservation Commission, the city once called Sibley and Frogtown was renamed as Pequot. In 1900, Walter and Flora Brown filed their plat for the E 1/2 of the SW 1/4 section 10 in T136N-R29W under the title Pequot. The Pequot Indians are a tribe that used to dominate southeastern New England before the English colonists arrived. While no Pequot tribe members lived in Minnesota, they spoke an Algonquian language related to that of the local Chippewa (Ojibwe) tribes. Author Herman Melville named his lead ship in his novel Moby-Dick as the Pequod.

Two possible explanations for the town's name arise:

1. The local historian Carl Zapffe suggests that a variation of the Chippewa word for arrow (bikwas), as listed by Father Barroga in his Chippewa dictionary, gave rise to the word Pequot.

2. In a 1936 interview, Laurence Anderson, who moved to the town in the mid-1890s, gave the following explanation. "A daughter of 'Waubanaquot,' Chief of the White Earth tribe, was named 'O-Pequot' and lived north of the town on the north end of Sibley Lake. She graciously allowed her dugout home to be used as a school and a church for the early settlers of the town. When she died, she was buried in the town cemetery."

Because there was already a town named Sibley in southwest Minnesota, the U.S. Post Office said the second Sibley had to take a new name. In any event, the town officially became Pequot Lakes in 1902.

On June 4, 2002, the former Sibley Township was absorbed into the City of Pequot Lakes.

== Geography ==
According to the United States Census Bureau, the city has a total area of 18.15 square miles (47.01 km^{2}), of which 16.43 square miles (42.55 km^{2}) is land and 1.81 square miles (4.69 km^{2}) is water.

Pequot Lakes is part of the Brainerd Lakes Area.

Most of the current area of Pequot Lakes was gained through an annexation of the entirety of the surrounding former Sibley Township on June 4, 2002.

== Demographics ==
Historical population
Census	Pop.	Note	%±
1910	260		—
1920	419		61.2%
1930	488		16.5%
1940	514		5.3%
1950	552		7.4%
1960	461		−16.5%
1970	499		8.2%
1980	681		36.5%
1990	843		23.8%
2000	947		12.3%
2010	2,162		128.3%
2020	2,395		10.8%
U.S. Decennial Census; 2013 Estimate

=== 2020 census ===
As of the 2020 census, Pequot Lakes had a population of 2,395. The median age was 41.4 years. 23.4% of residents were under the age of 18 and 22.7% of residents were 65 years of age or older. For every 100 females there were 95.5 males, and for every 100 females age 18 and over there were 92.3 males age 18 and over.

0.0% of residents lived in urban areas, while 100.0% lived in rural areas.

There were 1,039 households in Pequot Lakes, of which 26.5% had children under the age of 18 living in them. Of all households, 43.0% were married-couple households, 18.8% were households with a male householder and no spouse or partner present, and 29.5% were households with a female householder and no spouse or partner present. About 35.9% of all households were made up of individuals and 17.6% had someone living alone who was 65 years of age or older.

There were 1,448 housing units, of which 28.2% were vacant. The homeowner vacancy rate was 1.6% and the rental vacancy rate was 11.3%.

Racial composition as of the 2020 census
Race	Number	Percent
White	2,257	94.2%
Black or African American	7	0.3%
American Indian and Alaska Native	15	0.6%
Asian	12	0.5%
Native Hawaiian and Other Pacific Islander	4	0.2%
Some other race	7	0.3%
Two or more races	93	3.9%
Hispanic or Latino (of any race)	27	1.1%

=== 2010 census ===
As of the census of 2010, there were 2,162 people, 955 households, and 576 families living in the city. The population density was 132.4 inhabitants per square mile (51.1/km^{2}). There were 1,392 housing units at an average density of 85.2 per square mile (32.9/km^{2}). The racial makeup of the city was 97.3% White, 0.4% African American, 0.8% Native American, 0.6% Asian, 0.3% from other races, and 0.6% from two or more races. Hispanic or Latino of any race were 1.1% of the population.

There were 955 households, of which 28.5% had children under the age of 18 living with them, 44.5% were married couples living together, 11.4% had a female householder with no husband present, 4.4% had a male householder with no wife present, and 39.7% were non-families. 34.2% of all households were made up of individuals, and 16.6% had someone living alone who was 65 years of age or older. The average household size was 2.26 and the average family size was 2.89.

The median age in the city was 40.6 years. 24.5% of residents were under the age of 18; 8.2% were between the ages of 18 and 24; 22.1% were from 25 to 44; 26.7% were from 45 to 64; and 18.5%

=== 2000 census ===
As of the census of 2000, there were 947 people, 479 households, and 231 families living in the city. The population density was 653.8 inhabitants per square mile (252.4/km^{2}). There were 564 housing units at an average density of 389.4 per square mile (150.3/km^{2}). The racial makeup of the city was 98.10% White, 1.06% African American, 0.32% Native American, 0.32% Asian, 0.11% from other races, and 0.11% from two or more races. Hispanic or Latino of any race were 0.74% of the population.

There were 479 households, out of which 23.6% had children under the age of 18 living with them, 36.5% were married couples living together, 9.8% had a female householder with no husband present, and 51.6% were non-families. 47.6% of all households were made up of individuals, and 24.4% had someone living alone who was 65 years of age or older. The average household size was 1.96 and the average family size was 2.81.

In the city, the population was spread out, with 23.9% under the age of 18, 8.7% from 18 to 24, 24.8% from 25 to 44, 19.5% from 45 to 64, and 23.1% who were 65 years of age or older. The median age was 39 years. For every 100 females, there were 78.7 males. For every 100 females age 18 and over, there were 76.7 males.

The median income for a household in the city was $23,813, and the median income for a family was $35,000. Males had a median income of $28,355 versus $18,816 for females. The per capita income for the city was $16,275. About 11.5% of families and 14.8% of the population were below the poverty line, including 15.9% of those under age 18 and 12.0% of those age 65 or over.

== Arts and culture ==
=== Festival ===
A tradition beginning in 1938, Pequot Lakes annually hosts the Bean Hole Days festival in July. It is centered around an old tradition of cooking beans in pots in pits. The festival originally began when store owners in the town hosted a bean feed for the local farmers, and the tradition continued. Over the years, new traditions were created, such as giving pots Scandinavian names like Ole and Sven, and electing a Bean Hole Days "King" and "Queen."

== Infrastructure ==
=== Transportation ===
Minnesota Highway 371 had served as a main route in the city, until a bypass was put in and the previously named Highway 371 was renamed Patriot Ave. after the local high school sports team. Other routes include County Roads 11, 16, 17, 29, and 112.

== Education ==
Pequot Lakes Public Schools is the local school district. Pequot Lakes High School is the local high school.
