= Ideal Township, Crow Wing County, Minnesota =

Township in Minnesota, United States

Ideal Township
- Township
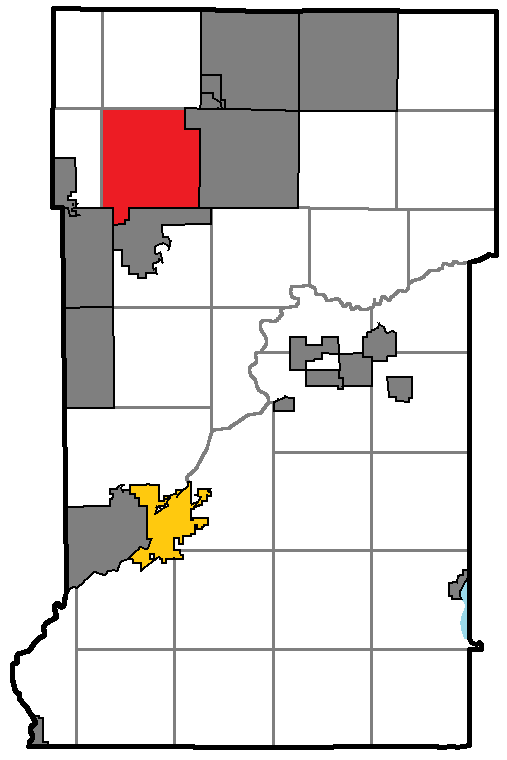
- Location of Ideal Township, within Crow Wing County, Minnesota
- Coordinates: 46°40′12″N 94°13′19″W
- Country: United States
- State: Minnesota
- County: Crow Wing

Area
  - Total: 35.1 sq mi (90.8 km^{2})
  - Land: 19.6 sq mi (50.8 km^{2})
  - Water: 15.4 sq mi (40.0 km^{2})
- Elevation: 1,237 ft (377 m)

Population (2020)
  - Total: 1,210
  - Density: 61.7/sq mi (23.8/km^{2})
- Time zone: UTC-6 (Central (CST))
  - Summer (DST): UTC-5 (CDT)
- ZIP code: 56472
- Area code: 218
- FIPS code: 27-30734
- GNIS feature ID: 0664540
- Website: https://idealtownship.com/

Ideal Township is a township in Crow Wing County, Minnesota, United States. The population was 1,210 at the 2020 census. The unincorporated community of Ideal Corners is located within the township.

== Geography ==
According to the United States Census Bureau, the township has a total area of 35.0 square miles (91 km^{2}), of which 19.6 square miles (51 km^{2}) is land and 15.4 square miles (40 km^{2}) (44.04%) is water.

== Demographics ==
As of the census of 2000, there were 950 people, 435 households, and 317 families residing in the township. The population density was 48.4 inhabitants per square mile (18.7/km^{2}). There were 1,416 housing units at an average density of 72.2 per square mile (27.9/km^{2}). The racial makeup of the township was 99.05% White, 0.32% African American, 0.42% Asian, and 0.21% from two or more races. Hispanic or Latino of any race were 0.32% of the population.

There were 435 households, out of which 19.3% had children under the age of 18 living with them, 66.7% were married couples living together, 4.6% had a female householder with no husband present, and 27.1% were non-families. 23.4% of all households were made up of individuals, and 12.4% had someone living alone who was 65 years of age or older. The average household size was 2.18 and the average family size was 2.56.

In the township the population was spread out, with 17.3% under the age of 18, 4.2% from 18 to 24, 18.4% from 25 to 44, 31.2% from 45 to 64, and 28.9% who were 65 years of age or older. The median age was 52 years. For every 100 females, there were 98.3 males. For every 100 females age 18 and over, there were 95.0 males.

The median income for a household in the township was $46,607, and the median income for a family was $51,167. Males had a median income of $41,875 versus $25,694 for females. The per capita income for the township was $29,697. About 3.7% of families and 5.0% of the population were below the poverty line, including 3.8% of those under age 18 and 4.0% of those age 65 or over.
