= Lake Edward Township, Crow Wing County, Minnesota =

Township in Minnesota, United States

Lake Edward Township
- Township
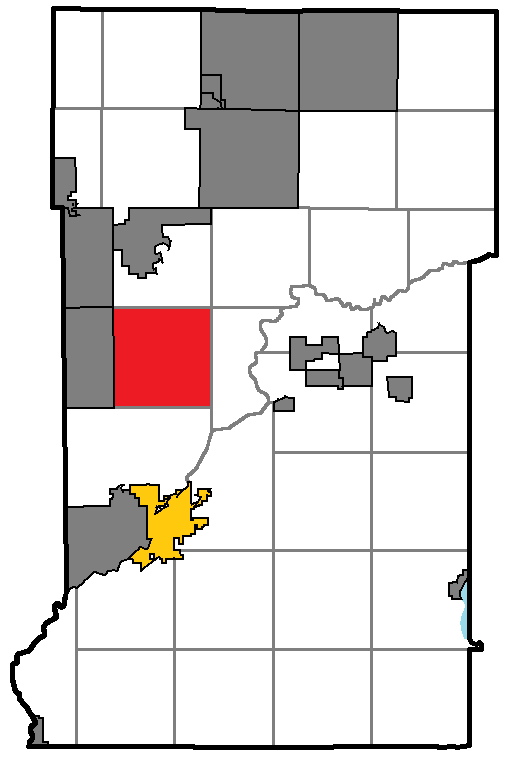
- Location of Lake Edward Township, within Crow Wing County, Minnesota
- Coordinates: 46°29′35″N 94°11′34″W
- Country: United States
- State: Minnesota
- County: Crow Wing

Area
  - Total: 36.2 sq mi (93.8 km^{2})
  - Land: 25.4 sq mi (65.8 km^{2})
  - Water: 10.8 sq mi (28.0 km^{2})

Population (2020)
  - Total: 2,108
  - Density: 83.0/sq mi (32.0/km^{2})
- Time zone: UTC-6 (Central (CST))
  - Summer (DST): UTC-5 (CDT)
- FIPS code: 27-34208

Lake Edward Township (or Lake Edwards Township) is a township in Crow Wing County, Minnesota, United States. The population was 2,108 at the 2020 census.

The unincorporated community of Merrifield is located within Lake Edward Township.

== Geography ==
According to the United States Census Bureau, the township has a total area of 36.2 square miles (94 km^{2}), of which 25.4 square miles (66 km^{2}) is land and 10.8 square miles (28 km^{2}) (29.84%) is water.

== Demographics ==
As of the census of 2000, there were 1,995 people, 785 households, and 595 families residing in the township. The population density was 78.5 inhabitants per square mile (30.3/km^{2}). There were 1,393 housing units at an average density of 54.8 per square mile (21.2/km^{2}). The racial makeup of the township was 98.75% White, 0.15% African American, 0.20% Native American, 0.05% Asian, 0.20% from other races, and 0.65% from two or more races. Hispanic or Latino of any race were 0.55% of the population.

There were 785 households, out of which 30.3% had children under the age of 18 living with them, 67.9% were married couples living together, 4.6% had a female householder with no husband present, and 24.1% were non-families. 19.4% of all households were made up of individuals, and 7.4% had someone living alone who was 65 years of age or older. The average household size was 2.54 and the average family size was 2.91.

In the township the population was spread out, with 24.2% under the age of 18, 5.9% from 18 to 24, 25.6% from 25 to 44, 29.1% from 45 to 64, and 15.2% who were 65 years of age or older. The median age was 42 years. For every 100 females, there were 111.3 males. For every 100 females age 18 and over, there were 108.7 males.

The median income for a household in the township was $43,274, and the median income for a family was $46,174. Males had a median income of $34,875 versus $21,250 for females. The per capita income for the township was $19,714. About 7.6% of families and 8.9% of the population were below the poverty line, including 10.9% of those under age 18 and 18.8% of those age 65 or over.
