= Little Nokasippi River =

River in Minnesota, US

Coordinates: 46°11′01″N 94°21′06″W

Location
- Country: United States

Physical characteristics
- Source
  - location: Minnesota
- Mouth
  - location: Nokasippi River

The Little Nokasippi River is a 13.8-mile-long (22.2 km) tributary of the Nokasippi River in southern Crow Wing County, Minnesota. It joins the Nokasippi just 1.0 mile (1.6 km) upstream from that river's mouth at the Mississippi River.

== See also ==
- List of rivers of Minnesota
