= Lake Hubert (Minnesota) =

Lake in the state of Minnesota, United States

- Location within Minnesota
- Location: Crow Wing County, Minnesota
- Coordinates: 46°29′12″N 94°16′0″W
- Type: lake

Lake Hubert is a lake in Crow Wing County, in the U.S. state of Minnesota.

According to Warren Upham, Lake Hubert may have been named after Hubertus, the patron saint of hunters.

== See also ==
- List of lakes in Minnesota
