= Nokay Lake Township, Crow Wing County, Minnesota =

Township in Minnesota, United States

Nokay Lake Township
- Township
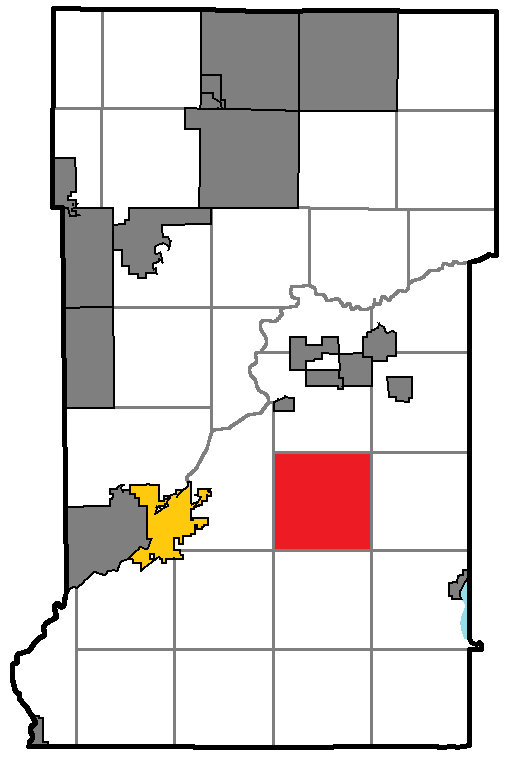
- Location of Nokay Lake Township, within Crow Wing County, Minnesota
- Coordinates: 46°23′2″N 93°59′0″W
- Country: United States
- State: Minnesota
- County: Crow Wing

Area
  - Total: 35.9 sq mi (93.0 km^{2})
  - Land: 33.1 sq mi (85.8 km^{2})
  - Water: 2.8 sq mi (7.2 km^{2})
- Elevation: 1,240 ft (378 m)

Population (2020)
  - Total: 898
  - Density: 27.1/sq mi (10.5/km^{2})
- Time zone: UTC-6 (Central (CST))
  - Summer (DST): UTC-5 (CDT)
- FIPS code: 27-46384
- GNIS feature ID: 0665128

Nokay Lake Township is a township in Crow Wing County, Minnesota, United States. The population was 898 at the 2020 census. This township took its name from Nokay Lake.

== Geography ==
According to the United States Census Bureau, the township has a total area of 35.9 square miles (93.0 km^{2}), of which 33.1 square miles (85.8 km^{2}) is land and 2.8 square miles (7.2 km^{2}) (7.72%) is water.

== Demographics ==
As of the census of 2000, there were 681 people, 255 households, and 195 families residing in the township. The population density was 20.6 people per square mile (7.9/km^{2}). There were 296 housing units at an average density of 8.9/sq mi (3.4/km^{2}). The racial makeup of the township was 97.94% White, 0.15% African American, 0.29% Native American, 0.44% Asian, 0.59% from other races, and 0.59% from two or more races. Hispanic or Latino of any race were 1.03% of the population.

There were 255 households, out of which 36.1% had children under the age of 18 living with them, 70.2% were married couples living together, 3.5% had a female householder with no husband present, and 23.5% were non-families. 20.8% of all households were made up of individuals, and 8.6% had someone living alone who was 65 years of age or older. The average household size was 2.67 and the average family size was 3.09.

In the township the population was spread out, with 26.9% under the age of 18, 7.3% from 18 to 24, 28.3% from 25 to 44, 24.2% from 45 to 64, and 13.2% who were 65 years of age or older. The median age was 38 years. For every 100 females, there were 106.4 males. For every 100 females age 18 and over, there were 104.1 males.

The median income for a household in the township was $35,809, and the median income for a family was $40,227. Males had a median income of $32,574 versus $21,875 for females. The per capita income for the township was $15,393. About 10.9% of families and 12.4% of the population were below the poverty line, including 13.6% of those under age 18 and 16.0% of those age 65 or over.
