= Nokay Lake =

Lake in the state of Minnesota, United States

- Location within Minnesota
- Location: Crow Wing County, Minnesota
- Coordinates: 46°22′43″N 93°57′50″W
- Type: lake

Nokay Lake is a lake in Crow Wing County, in the U.S. state of Minnesota.

Nokay Lake was named for Chief Nokay of the Ojibwe Indians.
