= List of county roads in Cass County, Minnesota =

- Standard county road marker

Highway names
- Interstates: Interstate X (I-X)
- US Highways: U.S. Highway X (US X)
- State: Trunk Highway X (MN X or TH X)
- County State-Aid Highways: County State-Aid Highway X (CSAH X)
- County Roads: County Road X (CR X)

System links
- County roads of Minnesota; Cass County

The following is a list of county-maintained roads in Cass County, Minnesota, United States. Some of the routes included in this list are also county-state-aid-highways (CSAH.)

== Route list ==
Number	Length (mi)	Length (km)	Southern or western terminus	Northern or eastern terminus	Local names	Formed	Removed	Notes
CSAH 1	—	—	MN 210 in Sylvan Township	Ridge Avenue in Pine River		—	—	Southern segment
CSAH 1	—	—	5th Street in Pine River	Crow Wing County line	24th Street	—	—	Eastern segment
CSAH 2	—	—	84th Avenue (County 111) in Ansel Township	1st Street in Pine River	24th Street	—	—	
CSAH 3	—	—	Itasca County line	Itasca County line	72nd Avenue; 124th Street	—	—	
CSAH 4	—	—	County 8 in Gould Township	Airport Drive in Remer	102nd Street	—	—	
CSAH 5	—	—	MN 371 in Hackensack	MN 84 in Longville		—	—	
CSAH 6	—	—	Hubbard County line	MN 371 in Birch Lake Township		—	—	
CSAH 7	—	—	MN 84 in Longville	MN 6 in Remer Township	44th Street	—	—	
CSAH 8	—	—	MN 200 in Kego Township	US 2 in Unorganized Cass County		—	—	
CSAH 9	—	—	US 2 in Unorganized Cass County	Itasca County line	Winnie Dam Road	—	—	
CSAH 10	—	—	US 2 in Unorganized Cass County	Beltrami County line	Scenic Highway	—	—	
CSAH 11	—	—	County 5 in Woodrow Township	MN 84 in Woodrow Township		—	—	
CSAH 12	—	—	Hubbard County line	MN 200 and MN 371 in Walker	10th Street	—	—	
CSAH 13	—	—	MN 200 in Turtle Lake Township	Cedar Point Road in Shingobee Township	Onigum Road	—	—	
CSAH 14	—	—	County 2 in Pine River Township	Leatherwood Lane in Pine River	Barclay Avenue	—	—	
CSAH 15	—	—	County 1 in Fairview Township	County 77 in Fairview Township	100th Street	—	—	
CSAH 17	—	—	County 1 in Maple Township	Crow Wing County line	56th Street	—	—	
CSAH 18	—	—	MN 210 in Sylvan Township	County 77 in East Gull Lake		—	—	
CSAH 19	—	—	Wadena County line	MN 64 in McKinley Township	12th Street	—	—	
CSAH 20	—	—	Wadena County line	MN 64 in Ansel Township		—	—	
CSAH 21	—	—	Hubbard County line	MN 371 in Wilkinson Township	136th Street	—	—	
CSAH 22	—	—	Hubbard County line	61st Avenue (County 147) in Pike Bay Township	156th Street	—	—	
CSAH 23	—	—	Wadena County line	MN 64 in Poplar Township	60th Street	—	—	
CSAH 24	—	—	MN 64 in Poplar Township	County 1 in Maple Township	62nd Street; 64th Street	—	—	
CSAH 25	—	—	64th Street (County 24) in Moose Lake Township	MN 371 in Pine River Township	57th Avenue; 58th Street; 55th Avenue; 52nd Street; 53rd Avenue; 48th Street; 56th Avenue; 36th Street; 54th Avenue; 32nd Street; 48th Avenue; 10th Street; 46th Avenue; 8th Street	—	—	
CSAH 26	—	—	48th Street (County 28) in Walden Township	24th Street (County 2) in Walden Township	40th Avenue	—	—	
CSAH 27	—	—	46th Avenue (County 25) in Pine River Township	MN 87 in Bull Moose Township	8th Street; 48th Avenue	—	—	
CSAH 28	—	—	53rd Avenue (County 25) in Moose Lake Township	County 1 in Maple Township	48th Street	—	—	
CSAH 29	—	—	County 1 in Homebrook Township	Crow Wing County line	76th Street	—	—	
CSAH 30	—	—	Wadena County line	MN 64 in Byron Township	84th Street	—	—	
CSAH 31	—	—	MN 210 in May Township	3rd Street in Pillager	51st Avenue; 132nd Street; Hazel Avenue	—	—	
CSAH 32	—	—	120th Street (County 33) in Becker Township	95th Avenue (County 67) in Becker Township		—	—	
CSAH 33	—	—	Todd County line	MN 64 in May Township	120th Street	—	—	
CSAH 34	—	—	MN 64 in May Township	County 1 in Fairview Township	112th Street	—	—	
CSAH 35	—	—	MN 210 in May Township	MN 64 in Meadow Brook Township	57th Avenue; 92nd Street	—	—	
CSAH 36	—	—	MN 210 in Sylvan Township	MN 210 in Sylvan Township	21st Avenue; 136th Street; 11th Avenue	—	—	
CSAH 38	—	—	Hubbard County line	MN 200 and MN 371 in Shingobee Township		—	—	
CSAH 39	—	—	MN 200 in Kego Township	MN 200 in Kego Township	72nd Street	—	—	
CSAH 40	—	—	Hubbard County line	MN 371 in Hackensack		—	—	
CSAH 41	—	—	MN 87 in Deerfield Township	County 40 in Hiram Township	68th Avenue; 16th Street	—	—	
CSAH 42	—	—	Murray Avenue in Pine River	MN 87 in Powers Township	1st Street; 24th Avenue; 8th Street; 28th Avenue	—	—	
CSAH 43	—	—	MN 84 in Barclay Township	County 49 in Ponto Lake Township	12th Street; 12th Avenue	—	—	
CSAH 44	—	—	MN 371 in Wilson Township	MN 84 in Barclay Township	16th Avenue	—	—	
CSAH 45	—	—	MN 371 in Birch Lake Township	County 5 in Birch Lake Township		—	—	
CSAH 46	—	—	County 5 in Birch Lake Township	MN 84 in Ponto Lake Township	21st Street	—	—	
CSAH 47	—	—	MN 84 in Woodrow Township	Old Grade Trail (County 54) in Wabedo Township	24th Street	—	—	
CSAH 48	—	—	Crow Wing County line	8th Avenue (County 174) in Blind Lake Township	Division Street; Central Avenue; 4th Street; Short Cut Road; 8th Street	—	—	Western segment
CSAH 48	—	—	County 55 in Trelipe Township	MN 6 in Crooked Lake Township	12th Street; Lake Washburn Road	—	—	Eastern segment
CSAH 49	—	—	MN 84 in Ponto Lake Township	8th Avenue (County 174) in Blind Lake Township	12th Street	—	—	
CSAH 50	—	—	MN 371 in Turtle Lake Township	MN 34 in Shingobee Township		—	—	
CSAH 52	—	—	County 4 in Slater Township	County 65 in Salem Township		—	—	
CSAH 53	—	—	MN 200 in Inguadona Township	County 4 in Slater Township	Tobique Road	—	—	
CSAH 54	—	—	24th Street (County 47) in Wabedo Township	County 7 in Wabedo Township		—	—	
CSAH 55	—	—	12th Street (County 48/County 160) in Trelipe Township	44th Street (County 7) in Trelipe Township		—	—	
CSAH 57	—	—	Winding Road (County 68) in Smoky Hollow Township	MN 200 in Lima Township	42nd Street	—	—	
CSAH 58	—	—	MN 6 in Crooked Lake Township	Aitkin County line	Warbler Road	—	—	
CSAH 60	—	—	69th Avenue (County 75) in Pike Bay Township	US 2 in Cass Lake	164th Street; 61st Avenue	—	—	
CSAH 61	—	—	Hubbard County line	MN 371 in Leech Lake Township	108th Street	—	—	
CSAH 62	—	—	Hubbard County line	MN 371 in Leech Lake Township	100th Street	—	—	
CSAH 63	—	—	102nd Street (County 4) in Boy River Township	County 8 in Gould Township		—	—	
CSAH 65	—	—	County 4 in Salem Township	Itasca County line		—	—	
CSAH 66	—	—	72nd Avenue in Wilkinson Township	MN 371 in Wilkinson Township	122nd Street	—	—	
CSAH 67	—	—	Todd County line	84th Street (County 30) in Byron Township	95th Avenue	—	—	
CSAH 68	—	—	Aitkin County line	42nd Street (County 57) in Smoky Hollow Township	Winding Road	—	—	
CSAH 69	—	—	North Steamboat Lake Drive (County 141) in Wilkinson Township	156th Street (County 22) in Pike Bay Township	72nd Avenue; 144th Street; 73rd Avenue	—	—	
CSAH 70	—	—	County 77 in East Gull Lake	Pike Bay Road in East Gull Lake	East Gull Lake Drive	—	—	
CSAH 71	—	—	County 6 in Hiram Township	County 50 in Shingobee Township		—	—	
CSAH 72	—	—	Onigum Road (County 13) in Shingobee Township	Dead end in Turtle Lake Township	Pine Point Road	—	—	
CSAH 73	—	—	Sugar Point Drive (County 136) in Gould Township	County 8 in Gould Township		—	—	
CSAH 74	—	—	County 65 in Torrey Township	124th Street (County 3) in Unorganized Cass County	88th Avenue	—	—	
CSAH 75	—	—	US 2 in Pike Bay Township	Beltrami County line	69th Avenue	—	—	
CSAH 77	—	—	Crow Wing County line	Crow Wing County line	Pine Beach Road; Interlachen Road	—	—	
CSAH 78	—	—	Interlachen Road (County 77) in Lake Shore	76th Street (County 29) in Lake Shore		—	—	
CSAH 79	—	—	MN 84 in Ponto Lake Township	12th Avenue (County 43) in Ponto Lake Township	Division Street	—	—	
CR 87	—	—	Poncelet Road in Shingobee Township	County 12 in Shingobee Township	73rd Avenue	—	—	
CSAH 91	—	—	Scenic Highway (County 10) in Unorganized Cass County	Beltrami County line		—	—	Western segment
CSAH 91	—	—	Beltrami County line	US 2 in Unorganized Cass County	West Winnie Road	—	—	Eastern segment
CR 102	—	—	MN 210 in May Township	57th Avenue (County 35) in May Township	61st Avenue; 96th Street	—	—	
CR 103	—	—	92nd Street (County 35) in Meadow Brook Township	76th Street (County 103) in Meadow Brook Township	66th Avenue; 88th Street; 65th Avenue	—	—	Southern segment
CR 103	—	—	MN 64 in Meadow Brook Township	57th Avenue in Meadow Brook Township	76th Street	—	—	Northern segment
CR 104	—	—	112th Street (County 34) in May Township	104th Street in May Township	49th Avenue	—	—	
CR 105	—	—	Gull Lake Lane in East Gull Lake	Crow Wing County line	Gull Lake Dam Road	—	—	
CR 106	—	—	120th Street (County 33) in Becker Township	72nd Street in Byron Township	79th Avenue	—	—	
CR 107	—	—	County 1 in Homebrook Township	21st Avenue (County 107) in Homebrook Township	88th Street; 29th Avenue; 92nd Street; 25th Avenue; 91st Street	—	—	Western segment
CR 107	—	—	100th Street (County 15) in Fairview Township	County 78 in Lake Shore	Agate Lake Drive; 21st Avenue	—	—	Eastern segment
CR 108	—	—	37th Avenue in Homebrook Township	County 1 in Homebrook Township	76th Street	—	—	
CR 109	—	—	MN 64 in Byron Township	64th Street (County 24) in Moose Lake Township	71st Avenue	—	—	
CR 110	—	—	60th Street (County 23) in Poplar Township	County 20 in Ansel Township	Cass Line Road	—	—	
CR 111	—	—	16th Street in McKinley Township	12th Street (County 19) in McKinley Township	96th Avenue	—	—	Western segment
CR 111	—	—	County 20 in Ansel Township	12th Street (County 19) in McKinley Township	84th Avenue	—	—	Eastern segment
CR 112	—	—	MN 64 in McKinley Township	72nd Avenue (County 112) in McKinley Township	4th Street	—	—	Western segment
CR 112	—	—	24th Street (County 2) in McKinley Township	MN 87 in McKinley Township	72nd Avenue	—	—	Eastern segment
CR 114	—	—	County 1 in Walden Township	County 17 in Loon Lake Township	48th Street; 21st Avenue; 52nd Street	—	—	
CR 115	—	—	County 1 in Wilson Township	Crow Wing County line	44th Street	—	—	Southern segment
CR 115	—	—	44th Street (County 115) in Wilson Township	MN 371 in Wilson Township	16th Avenue	—	—	Northern segment
CR 116	—	—	MN 87 in Bull Moose Township	1st Avenue in Powers Township	Pine Mountain Lake Road; 45th Avenue	—	—	
CR 117	—	—	MN 371 in Powers Township	40th Avenue (County 117) in Powers Township	16th Street	—	—	Western segment
CR 117	—	—	MN 87 and MN 371 in Powers Township	County 45 in Powers Township	4th Street; 40th Avenue; 20th Street; 38th Avenue	—	—	Eastern segment
CR 118	—	—	28th Avenue (County 42) in Powers Township	MN 84 in Ponto Lake Township	Division Street	—	—	
CR 119	—	—	MN 87 in Ponto Lake Township	County 46 in Ponto Lake Township	16th Avenue; 16th Street; 12th Avenue; 21st Street	—	—	
CR 120	—	—	24th Street (County 47) in Wabedo Township	County 54 in Wabedo Township	Wabedo Pass Road	—	—	
CR 121	—	—	County 5 in Birch Lake Township	North Stony Drive in Birch Lake Township	36th Avenue	—	—	
CR 122	—	—	County 5 in Woodrow Township	Bluebird Trail in Birch Lake Township	23rd Avenue; Lake Drive	—	—	
CR 124	—	—	MN 200 in Turtle Lake Township	MN 200 in Pine Lake Township	36th Avenue; 64th Street; 24th Avenue	—	—	
CR 125	—	—	County 5 in Kego Township	MN 200 in Kego Township		—	—	
CR 126	—	—	MN 84 in Kego Township	MN 200 in Kego Township		—	—	
CR 127	—	—	County 39 in Kego Township	County 8 in Boy Lake Township	72nd Street	—	—	
CR 128	—	—	MN 200 in Kego Township	20th Avenue (County 157) in Boy Lake Township	24th Avenue; 79th Street	—	—	
CR 129	—	—	County 7 in Trelipe Township	MN 200 in Inguadona Township	32nd Avenue; 64th Street; 40th Avenue	—	—	
CR 130	—	—	Lakeside Park Drive in Slater Township	64th Avenue (County 130) in Slater Township	72nd Street	—	—	Western segment
CR 130	—	—	MN 200 in Remer Township	County 4 in Slater Township	64th Avenue	—	—	Eastern segment
CR 132	—	—	MN 200 in Lima Township	84th Avenue in Lima Township	64th Street	—	—	
CR 133	—	—	Dead end in Remer Township	MN 200 in Lima Township	52nd Street; 76th Avenue	—	—	
CR 135	—	—	County 63 in Boy River Township	County 65 in Salem Township	108th Street	—	—	
CR 136	—	—	Dead end in Gould Lake Township	County 73 in Gould Township	Sugar Point Drive	—	—	Western segment
CR 136	—	—	Point Lane in Gould Lake Township	County 73 in Gould Township	Battle Point Drive	—	—	Central segment
CR 136	—	—	Battle Point Drive (County 136) in Gould Lake Township	Pointview Drive in Gould Township	101st Street	—	—	Eastern segment
CR 137	—	—	Dead end in Torrey Township	County 65 in Torrey Township	82nd Avenue	—	—	
CR 139	—	—	72nd Avenue (County 3/County 158) in Unorganized Cass County	72nd Avenue (County 3) in Unorganized Cass County	124th Street; Mud Lake Road	—	—	
CR 141	—	—	Hubbard County line	68th Avenue (County 143) in Wilkinson Township	North Steamboat Lake Drive	—	—	Western segment
CR 141	—	—	MN 371 in Wilkinson Township	63rd Avenue in Wilkinson Township	131st Street	—	—	Eastern segment
CR 142	—	—	MN 371 in Leech Lake Township	MN 371 in Leech Lake Township	Steamboat Loop	—	—	
CR 143	—	—	130th Street in Wilkinson Township	61st Avenue (County 146) in Pike Bay Township	68th Avenue; 144th Street	—	—	
CR 144	—	—	Dead end in Wilkinson Township	MN 371 in Wilkinson Township	56th Avenue; 136th Street	—	—	Southern segment
CR 144	—	—	136th Street (County 144) in Wilkinson Township	61st Avenue (County 146) in Pike Bay Township	60th Avenue; 144th Street	—	—	Northern segment
CR 145	—	—	Hubbard County line	60th Avenue (County 144) in Wilkinson Township	140th Street	—	—	
CR 146	—	—	144th Street (County 143/County 144) in Pike Bay Township	61st Avenue (County 147) in Pike Bay Township	61st Avenue; 148th Street; 65th Avenue; 152nd Street	—	—	
CR 147	—	—	Bayview Loop in Pike Bay Township	3rd Street in Cass Lake	61st Avenue	—	—	
CR 149	—	—	US 2 in Pike Bay Township	Beltrami County line	65th Avenue	—	—	
CR 150	—	—	Hubbard County line	69th Avenue (County 75) in Pike Bay Township	Little Wolf Road	—	—	
CR 151	—	—	US 2 in Pike Bay Township	MN 371 in Cass Lake	160th Street	—	—	
CR 153	—	—	Onigum Road (County 13) in Turtle Lake Township	Hawthorne Trail in Turtle Lake Township		—	—	
CR 154	—	—	County 63 in Gould Township	Ash Street in Federal Dam	24th Avenue; 116th Street; 18th Avenue; 120th Street	—	—	
CR 155	—	—	Crow Wing County line	Lake Washburn Road (County 48) in Crooked Lake Township		—	—	
CR 156	—	—	79th Avenue (County 106) in Byron Township	MN 64 in Byron Township	80th Street	—	—	
CR 157	—	—	MN 200 in Kego Township	96th Street (County 172) in Boy Lake Township	20th Avenue; 88th Street; 20th Avenue	—	—	
CR 158	—	—	County 65 in Salem Township	124th Street (County 3/County 139) in Unorganized Cass County	72nd Avenue	—	—	
CR 160	—	—	8th Avenue (County 174) in Blind Lake Township	County 55 in Trelipe Township	8th Street; 12th Street	—	—	
CR 161	—	—	MN 6 in Thunder Lake Township	MN 6 in Thunder Lake Township	Big Rice Lake Road	—	—	Western segment
CR 161	—	—	Big Rice Lake Road (County 161) in Thunder Lake Township	County 57 in Smoky Hollow Township	44th Street; 68th Avenue; 42nd Street	—	—	Eastern segment
CR 163	—	—	MN 200 and MN 371 in Shingobee Township	MN 200 and MN 371 in Walker	Front Street	—	—	
CR 168	—	—	17th Avenue in Loon Lake Township	Crow Wing County line	64th Street	—	—	
CR 171	—	—	40th Avenue (County 26) in Walden Township	County 1 in Walden Township	32nd Street; 32nd Avenue; 29th Street	—	—	
CR 172	—	—	Woodchuck Lane in Rogers Township	County 8 in Boy Lake Township	Boy Lake Drive; 96th Street	—	—	
CR 173	—	—	Dead end in Woodrow Township	County 46 in Woodrow Township	Nature Center Drive	—	—	
CR 174	—	—	8th Street (County 48/County 160) in Blind Lake Township	24th Street (County 47) in Blind Lake Township	8th Avenue; 16th Street; Deer Creek Road	—	—	
CR 176	—	—	Hubbard County line	56th Avenue (County Road 146) in Pike Bay	148th Street	—	—	
CSAH 206	—	—	MN 371 in Cass Lake	US 2 in Cass Lake	2nd Street	—	—	
