= Wabedo Township, Cass County, Minnesota =

Wabedo Township, Minnesota
- Township
- Motto: "A Great Place To Live"
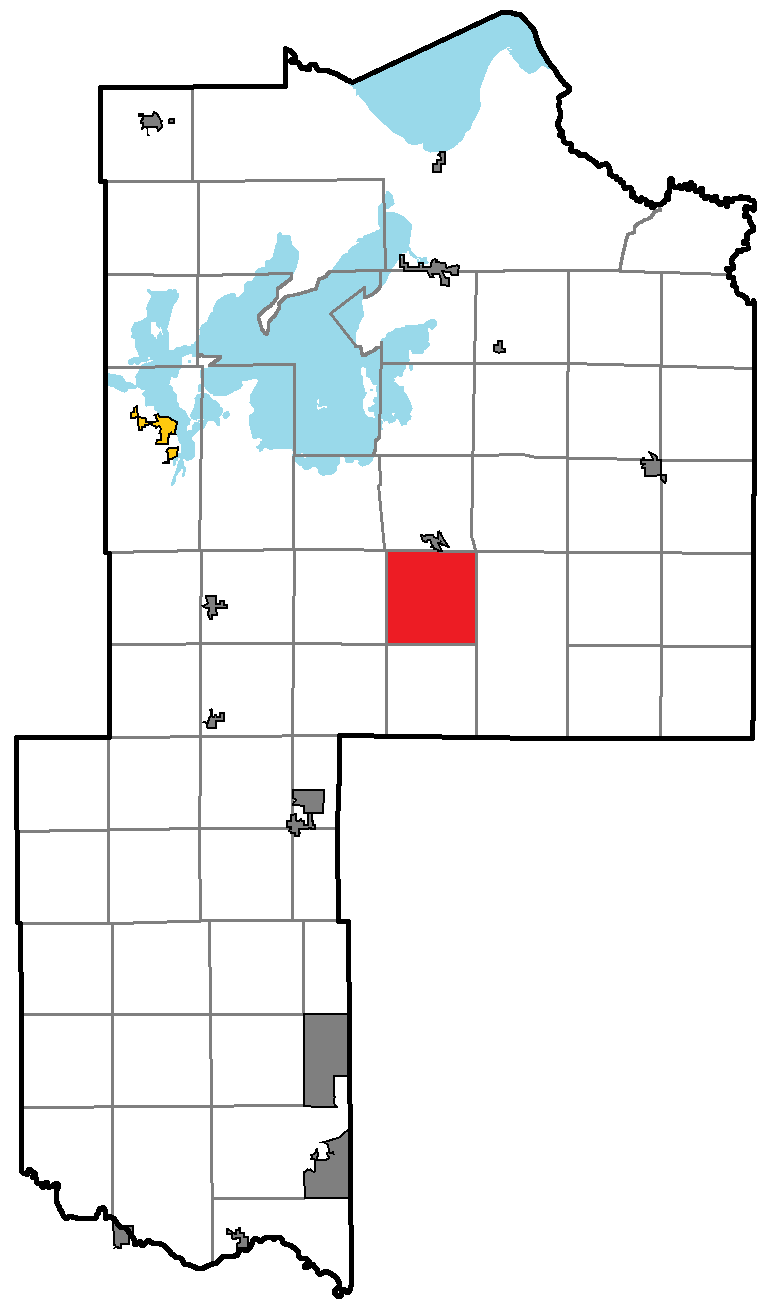
- Location of Wabedo Township, within Cass County, Minnesota
- Coordinates: 46°55′46″N 94°13′21″W
- Country: United States
- State: Minnesota
- County: Cass

Area
  - Total: 35.3 sq mi (91.5 km^{2})
  - Land: 24.6 sq mi (63.8 km^{2})
  - Water: 10.7 sq mi (27.7 km^{2})
- Elevation: 1,325 ft (404 m)

Population (2020)
  - Total: 423
  - Density: 17.2/sq mi (6.63/km^{2})
- Time zone: UTC-6 (Central (CST))
  - Summer (DST): UTC-5 (CDT)
- ZIP code: 56655
- Area code: 218
- FIPS code: 27-67414
- GNIS feature ID: 0665885
- Website: https://wabedotownshipmn.com/

Wabedo Township is a township in Cass County, Minnesota, United States. The population was 423 as of the 2020 census. This township took its name from Wabedo Lake.

== Geography ==
According to the United States Census Bureau, the township has a total area of 35.3 square miles (91.5 km^{2}), of which 24.6 square miles (63.8 km^{2}) is land and 10.7 square miles (27.7 km^{2}) (30.23%) is water.

The south edge of the city of Longville is located within Wabedo Township geographically but is a separate entity.

=== Unincorporated communities ===
- Wabedo

=== Major highway ===
- Minnesota State Highway 84

=== Lakes ===
- Brackett Lake
- Buck Lake
- Charles Lake (west half)
- Cooper Lake
- Crooked Lake
- Donkey Lake (east quarter)
- Girl Lake (south edge)
- Heffron Lake
- Hunter Lake
- Inguadona Lake (west edge)
- Jack Lake
- Little Boy Lake
- Mc Carthy Lake
- Mule Lake (vast majority)
- Rice Lake
- Shurd Lake
- Swede Lake
- Wabedo Lake
- Woman Lake (east half)

=== Adjacent townships ===
- Kego Township (north)
- Inguadona Township (northeast)
- Trelipe Township (east)
- Blind Lake Township (south)
- Ponto Lake Township (southwest)
- Woodrow Township (west)

== Demographics ==
As of the census of 2000, there were 375 people, 175 households, and 133 families residing in the township. The population density was 15.2 people per square mile (5.9/km^{2}). There were 650 housing units at an average density of 26.4 per square mile (10.2/km^{2}). The racial makeup of the township was 98.40% White, 0.53% Native American, 0.27% Asian, 0.27% Pacific Islander, and 0.53% from two or more races. Hispanic or Latino of any race were 1.07% of the population.

There were 175 households, out of which 12.0% had children under the age of 18 living with them, 73.7% were married couples living together, 0.6% had a female householder with no husband present, and 24.0% were non-families. 18.9% of all households were made up of individuals, and 8.0% had someone living alone who was 65 years of age or older. The average household size was 2.14 and the average family size was 2.37.

In the township the population was spread out, with 12.3% under the age of 18, 2.9% from 18 to 24, 13.6% from 25 to 44, 41.6% from 45 to 64, and 29.6% who were 65 years of age or older. The median age was 57 years. For every 100 females, there were 119.3 males. For every 100 females age 18 and over, there were 113.6 males.

The median income for a household in the township was $36,979, and the median income for a family was $43,500. Males had a median income of $35,208 versus $25,833 for females. The per capita income for the township was $21,022. None of the families and 3.4% of the population were living below the poverty line, including no under eighteens and 6.4% of those over 64.
