= Woodrow Township, Cass County, Minnesota =

Woodrow Township, Minnesota
- Township
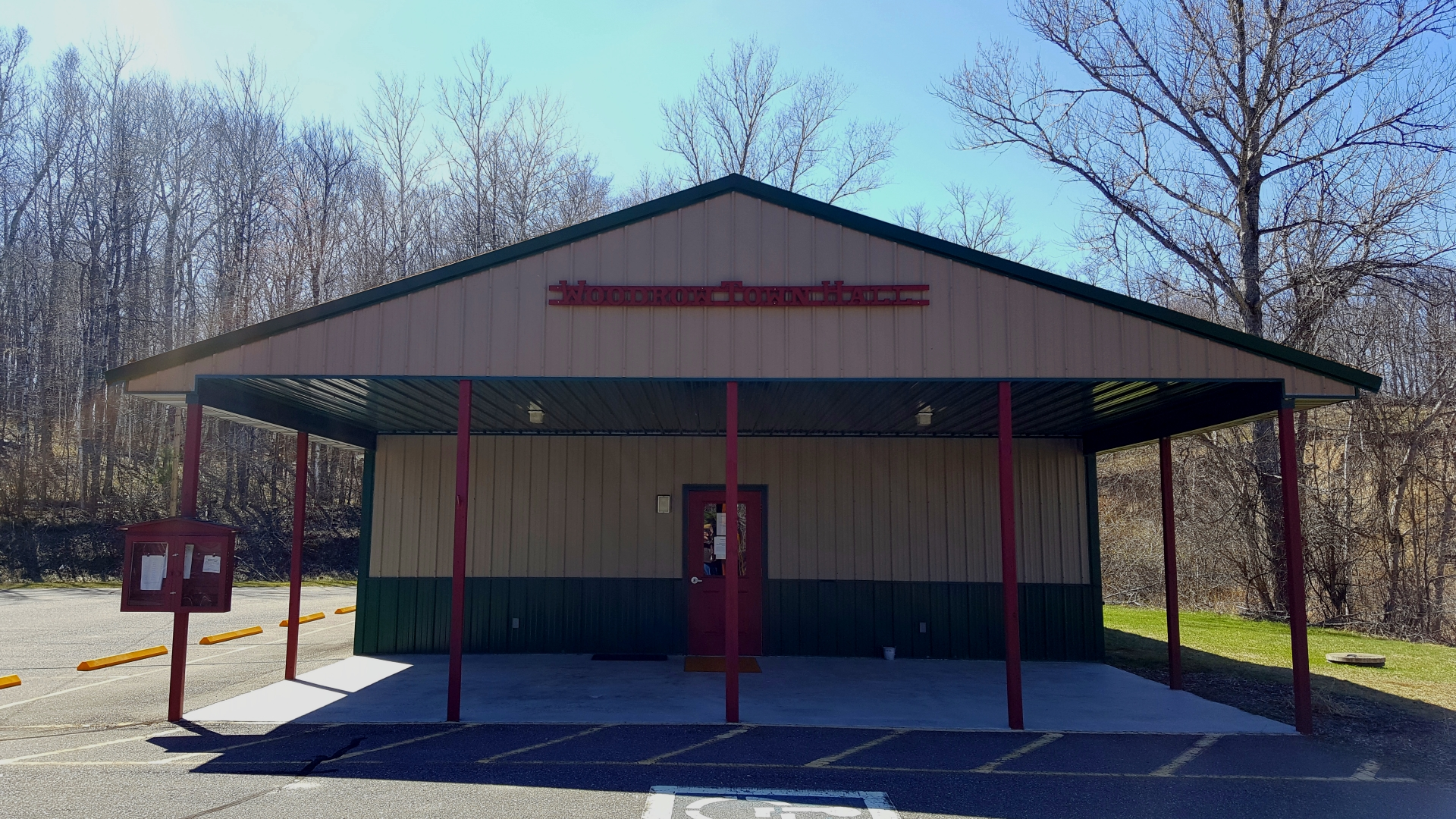
- Woodrow Township Hall

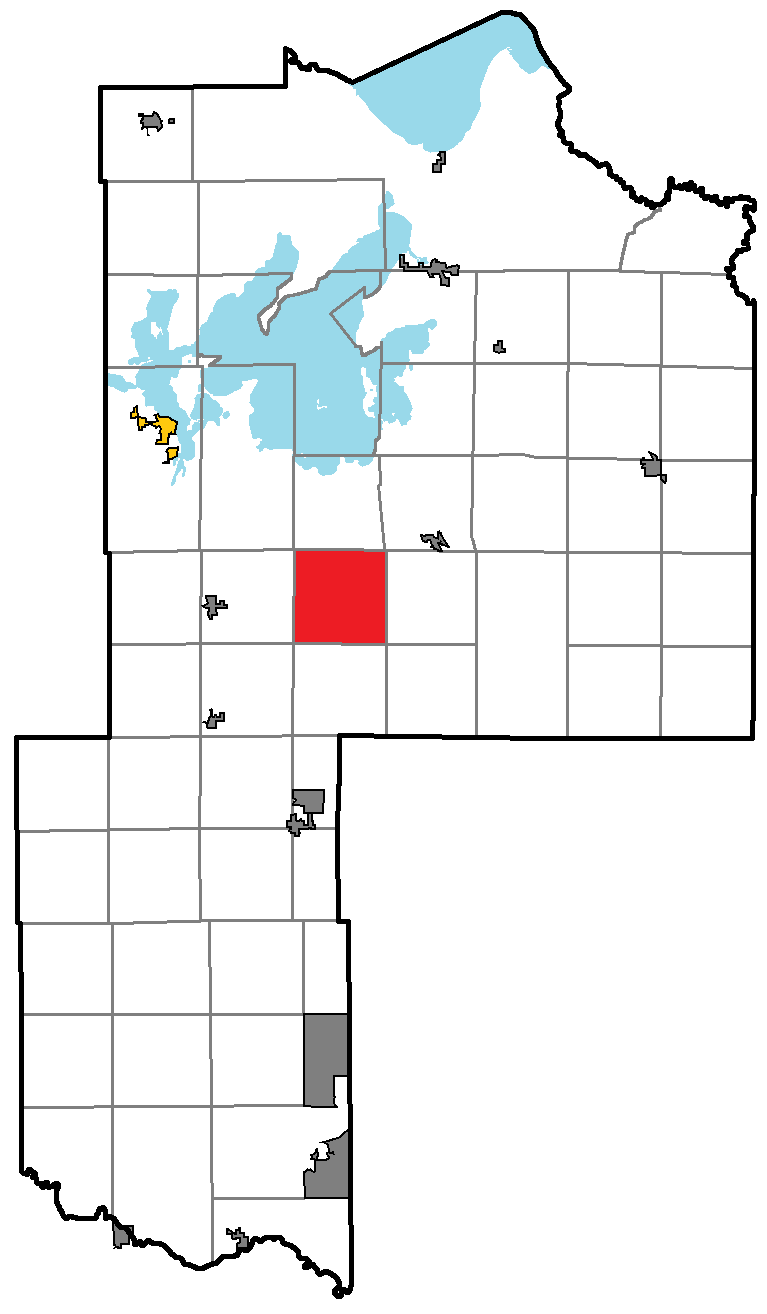
- Location of Woodrow Township, within Cass County, Minnesota
- Coordinates: 46°55′50″N 94°20′23″W
- Country: United States
- State: Minnesota
- County: Cass

Area
  - Total: 36.8 sq mi (95.2 km^{2})
  - Land: 25.1 sq mi (64.9 km^{2})
  - Water: 11.7 sq mi (30.3 km^{2})
- Elevation: 1,329 ft (405 m)

Population (2020)
  - Total: 710
  - Density: 28/sq mi (11/km^{2})
- Time zone: UTC-6 (Central (CST))
  - Summer (DST): UTC-5 (CDT)
- ZIP code: 56474
- Area code: 218
- FIPS code: 27-71608
- GNIS feature ID: 0666045
- Website: https://woodrowtwpmn.com/

Woodrow Township is a township in Cass County, Minnesota, United States. The population was 710 as of the 2020 census.

== History ==
Woodrow Township was named for Woodrow Wilson, 28th President of the United States.

== Geography ==
According to the United States Census Bureau, the township has a total area of 36.8 square miles (95.2 km^{2}), of which 25.1 square miles (64.9 km^{2}) is land and 11.7 square miles (30.4 km^{2}) (31.87%) is water.

=== Major highway ===
- Minnesota State Highway 84

=== Lakes ===
- Baby Lake (vast majority)
- Barnum Lake (south half)
- Barrow Lake
- Big Deep Lake
- Black Water Lake
- Blind Lake (northeast edge)
- Child Lake
- Donkey Lake (northwest three-quarters)
- I X L Lake
- Island Lake (north half)
- Kerr Lake
- Kid Lake
- Little Big Lake
- Lizard Lake
- Lost Lake
- Mann Lake (vast majority)
- Mc Keown Lake
- Mule Lake (west edge)
- Pancake Lake
- Pick Lake
- Primer Lake
- Sand Lake
- Squaw Lake
- Webb Lake (east edge)
- Widow Lake
- Woman Lake (west half)

=== Adjacent townships ===
- Pine Lake Township (north)
- Kego Township (northeast)
- Wabedo Township (east)
- Blind Lake Township (southeast)
- Ponto Lake Township (south)
- Powers Township (southwest)
- Birch Lake Township (west)

== Demographics ==
As of the census of 2000, there were 667 people, 327 households, and 238 families residing in the township. The population density was 26.6 inhabitants per square mile (10.3/km^{2}). There were 1,261 housing units at an average density of 50.3 per square mile (19.4/km^{2}). The racial makeup of the township was 98.65% White, 0.15% African American, 0.15% from other races, and 1.05% from two or more races. Hispanic or Latino of any race were 0.15% of the population.

There were 327 households, out of which 11.9% had children under the age of 18 living with them, 67.9% were married couples living together, 3.1% had a female householder with no husband present, and 27.2% were non-families. 22.0% of all households were made up of individuals, and 12.5% had someone living alone who was 65 years of age or older. The average household size was 2.04 and the average family size was 2.32.

In the township the population was spread out, with 10.8% under the age of 18, 3.0% from 18 to 24, 12.0% from 25 to 44, 40.5% from 45 to 64, and 33.7% who were 65 years of age or older. The median age was 59 years. For every 100 females, there were 106.5 males. For every 100 females age 18 and over, there were 103.1 males.

The median income for a household in the township was $35,987, and the median income for a family was $40,357. Males had a median income of $30,938 versus $18,750 for females. The per capita income for the township was $23,201. About 4.6% of families and 6.6% of the population were below the poverty line, including 4.8% of those under age 18 and 2.0% of those age 65 or over.
