= Tobique, Minnesota =

Unincorporated community in Minnesota, US

Tobique
- Unincorporated community
- Location within Minnesota Location within the United States
- Coordinates: 47°06′56″N 94°02′23″W
- Country: United States
- State: Minnesota
- County: Cass
- Township: Rogers Township
- Elevation: 1,319 ft (402 m)
- Time zone: UTC-6 (Central (CST))
  - Summer (DST): UTC-5 (CDT)
- ZIP code: 56672
- Area code: 218
- GNIS feature ID: 658699

Tobique is an unincorporated community in Rogers Township, Cass County, Minnesota, United States, near Remer. It is situated along Tobique Road NE near Cass County Road 4.
