= Outing, Minnesota =

Unincorporated community in Minnesota, US

Outing
- Unincorporated community
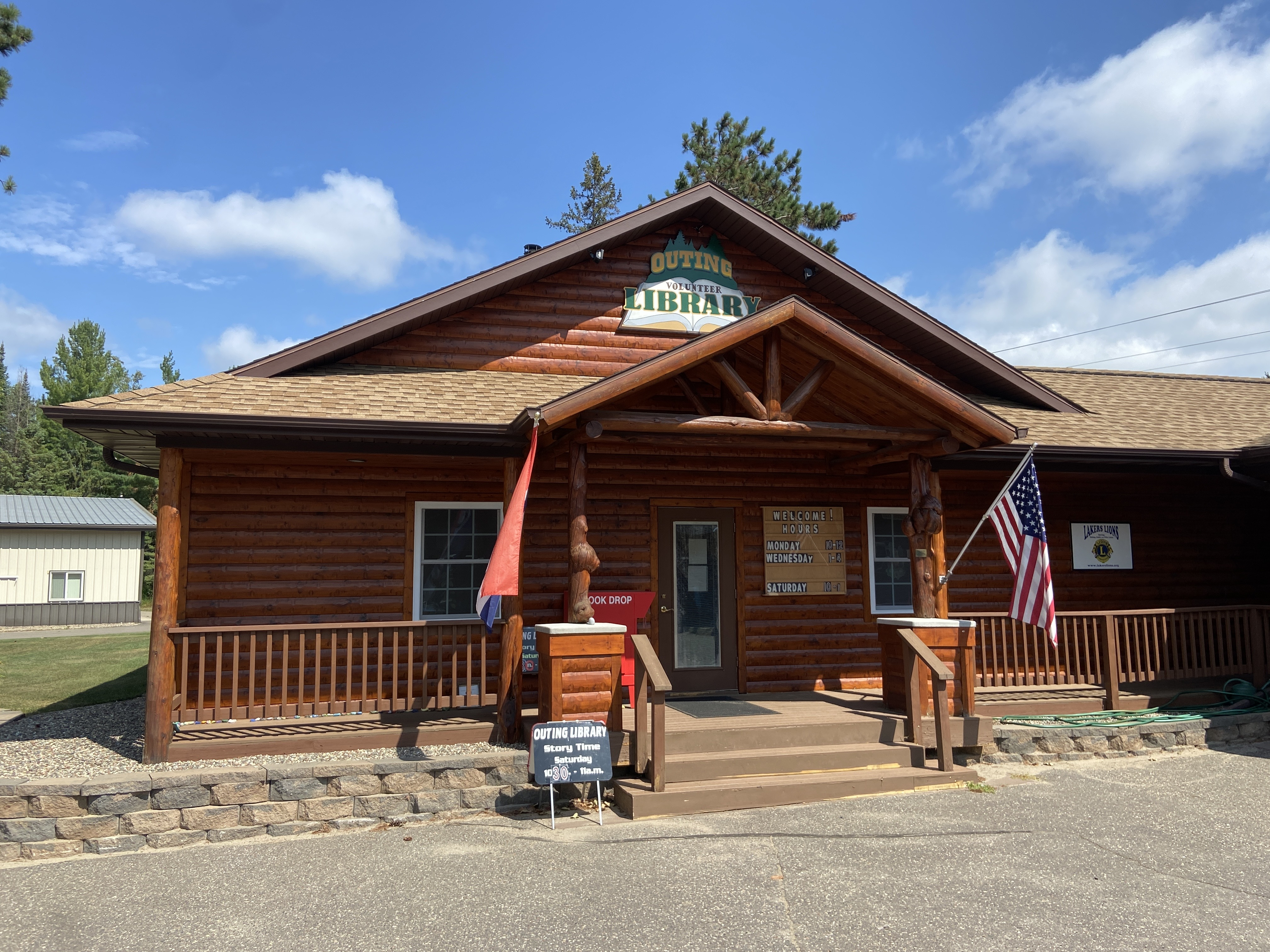
- Outing Library

- Location within Minnesota Location within the United States
- Coordinates: 46°49′14″N 93°56′53″W
- Country: United States
- State: Minnesota
- County: Cass
- Township: Crooked Lake Township
- Elevation: 1,316 ft (401 m)
- Time zone: UTC-6 (Central (CST))
  - Summer (DST): UTC-5 (CDT)
- ZIP code: 56662
- Area code: 218
- GNIS feature ID: 657706

Outing is an unincorporated community in Crooked Lake Township, Cass County, Minnesota, United States, near Emily. It is between North Roosevelt Lake, South Roosevelt Lake, and Lawrence Lake.

The community is between Crosby and Remer, near the junction of State Highway 6 (MN 6) and Cass County Road 58.

The Land O'Lakes State Forest and the Clint Converse campground on Washburn Lake are both nearby.

It is part of the Brainerd Micropolitan Statistical Area.

Local volunteers upgraded Outing's storm sirens in November 2007.

== History ==
Outing was registered on January 2, 1909 by William H. Andrews.

== Etymology ==
Crooked Lake derives its name from the English translation of the lake's Objibwe name, Wewagigumag sagaiigun.

On March 6, 1919, Crooked Lake was renamed to Lake Roosevelt, in honor of the recently deceased President Theodore Roosevelt, who died on January 6 of that year.

Surrounding lakes in the Crooked Lake and Beulah Townships, including Lakes George, Washburn, Lawrence, Leavitt, and Morrison are named after lumbermen working in the surrounding pine forests.

The name of the unincorporated community of Outing comes from Andrews’ vision of creating a place where urban Minnesotans and sportsmen could take short summer trips, or “outings.”
