= Wabedo, Minnesota =

Unincorporated community in Minnesota, US

Wabedo
- Unincorporated community
- Location within Minnesota Location within the United States
- Coordinates: 46°55′14″N 94°11′17″W
- Country: United States
- State: Minnesota
- County: Cass
- Township: Wabedo Township
- Elevation: 1,316 ft (401 m)
- Time zone: UTC-6 (Central (CST))
  - Summer (DST): UTC-5 (CDT)
- ZIP code: 56655
- Area code: 218
- GNIS feature ID: 658863

Wabedo is an unincorporated community in Wabedo Township, Cass County, Minnesota, United States, near Longville. It is along Cass County Road 54 near the junction with County Road 120.
