= Lima Township, Cass County, Minnesota =

Lima Township, Minnesota
- Township
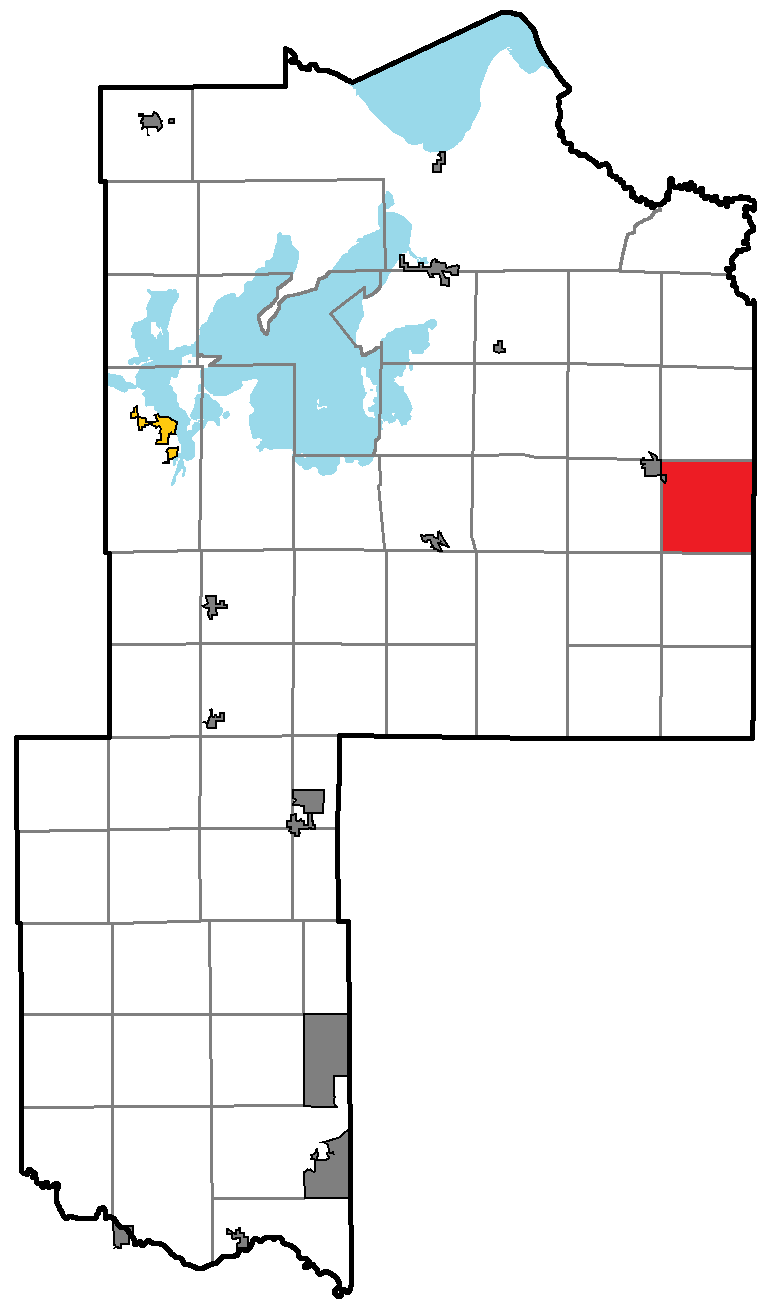
- Location of Lima Township, within Cass County, Minnesota
- Coordinates: 47°1′56″N 93°51′10″W
- Country: United States
- State: Minnesota
- County: Cass

Area
  - Total: 36.0 sq mi (93.2 km^{2})
  - Land: 35.4 sq mi (91.7 km^{2})
  - Water: 0.58 sq mi (1.5 km^{2})
- Elevation: 1,332 ft (406 m)

Population (2020)
  - Total: 91
  - Density: 2.6/sq mi (0.99/km^{2})
- Time zone: UTC-6 (Central (CST))
  - Summer (DST): UTC-5 (CDT)
- ZIP code: 56672
- Area code: 218
- FIPS code: 27-37034
- GNIS feature ID: 0664781

Lima Township is a township in Cass County, Minnesota, United States. The population was 91 as of the 2020 census. Lima Township was probably named after Lima, Ohio.

== Geography ==
According to the United States Census Bureau, the township has a total area of 36.0 square miles (93 km^{2}), of which 35.4 square miles (92 km^{2}) is land and 0.6 square miles (1.6 km^{2}) (1.58%) is water.

The east edge of the city of Remer is located within Lima Township geographically but is a separate entity.

=== Major highways ===
- Minnesota State Highway 6
- Minnesota State Highway 200

=== Lakes ===
- Birch Lake
- Finn Lake
- Little Birch Lake
- Sailor Lake
- Thiebault Lake

=== Adjacent townships ===
- Spang Township, Itasca County (east)
- Smoky Hollow Township (south)
- Thunder Lake Township (southwest)
- Remer Township (west)
- Slater Township (northwest)

== Demographics ==
As of the census of 2000, there were 111 people, 40 households, and 37 families residing in the township. The population density was 3.1 inhabitants per square mile (1.2/km^{2}). There were 58 housing units at an average density of 1.6 per square mile (0.62/km^{2}). The racial makeup of the township was 93.69% White, 4.50% Asian, and 1.80% from two or more races. Hispanic or Latino of any race were 7.21% of the population.

There were 40 households, out of which 40.0% had children under the age of 18 living with them, 82.5% were married couples living together, 2.5% had a female householder with no husband present, and 7.5% were non-families. 7.5% of all households were made up of individuals, and none had someone living alone who was 65 years of age or older. The average household size was 2.78 and the average family size was 2.92.

In the township the population was spread out, with 30.6% under the age of 18, 4.5% from 18 to 24, 26.1% from 25 to 44, 23.4% from 45 to 64, and 15.3% who were 65 years of age or older. The median age was 38 years. For every 100 females, there were 94.7 males. For every 100 females age 18 and over, there were 102.6 males.

The median income for a household in the township was $26,250, and the median income for a family was $26,750. Males had a median income of $29,167 versus $20,139 for females. The per capita income for the township was $11,462. There were 4.7% of families and 8.0% of the population living below the poverty line, including 19.1% of under eighteens and none of those over 64.
