= Thunder Lake Township, Cass County, Minnesota =

Thunder Lake Township, Minnesota
- Township
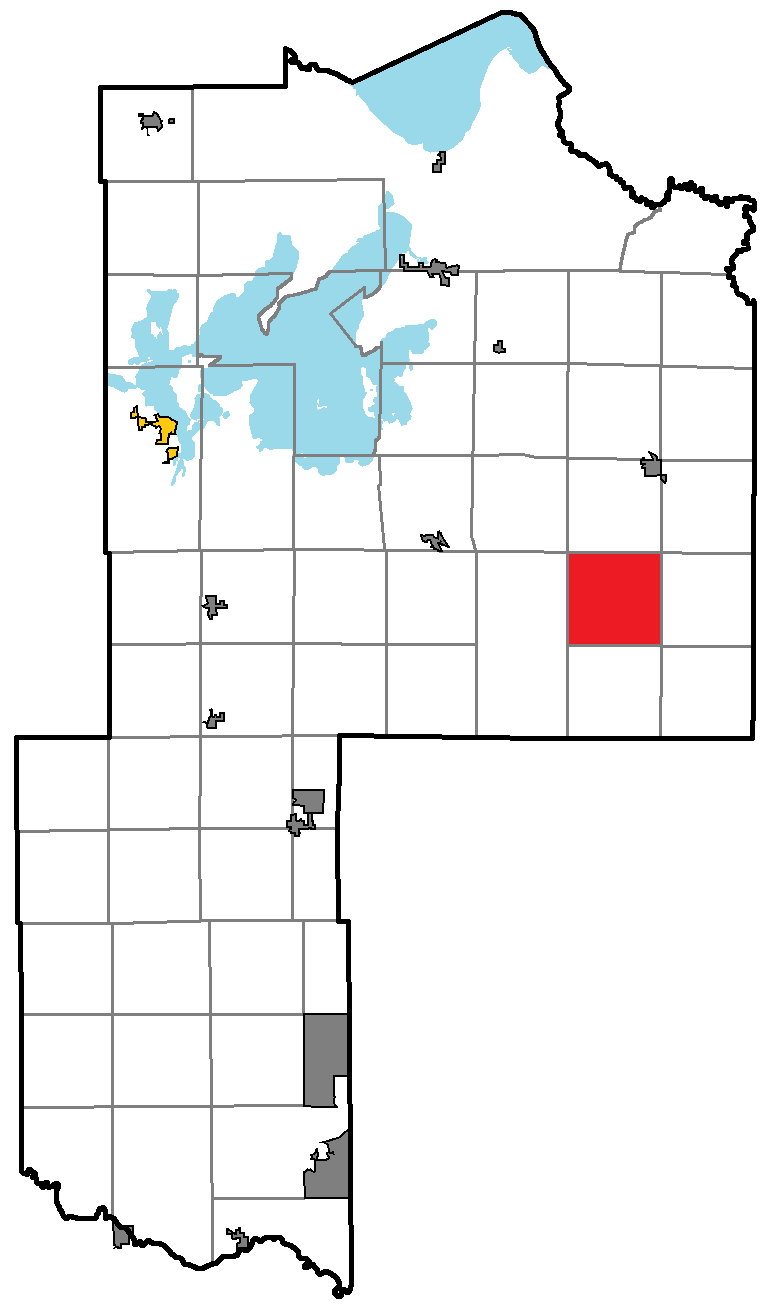
- Location of Thunder Lake Township, within Cass County, Minnesota
- Coordinates: 46°56′40″N 93°57′57″W
- Country: United States
- State: Minnesota
- County: Cass

Area
  - Total: 36.4 sq mi (94.4 km^{2})
  - Land: 32.2 sq mi (83.5 km^{2})
  - Water: 4.2 sq mi (10.9 km^{2})
- Elevation: 1,335 ft (407 m)

Population (2020)
  - Total: 225
  - Density: 6.98/sq mi (2.69/km^{2})
- Time zone: UTC-6 (Central (CST))
  - Summer (DST): UTC-5 (CDT)
- ZIP code: 56672
- Area code: 218
- FIPS code: 27-64876
- GNIS feature ID: 0665787

Thunder Lake Township is a township in Cass County, Minnesota, United States. The population was 225 as of the 2020 census. This township took its name from Thunder Lake.

== Geography ==
According to the United States Census Bureau, the township has a total area of 94.4 square kilometers (36.4 sq mi), of which 83.5 km^{2} (32.2 sq mi) is land and 10.9 square kilometres (4.2 sq mi) (11.52%) is water.

=== Major highway ===
- Minnesota State Highway 6

=== Lakes ===
- Big Bass Lake
- Big Rice Lake (south edge)
- Coffin Lake
- Deer Lake
- Island Lake (east quarter)
- Kidney Lake
- Laura Lake (southeast quarter)
- Little Bass Lake
- Lake George (northeast edge)
- Lost Lake
- Michaud Lake (west quarter)
- Oconner Lake (east three-quarters)
- Pug Hole Lake
- Thunder Lake
- Upper Trelipe Lake (east quarter)
- Washburn Lake (north edge)

=== Adjacent townships ===
- Remer Township (north)
- Lima Township (northeast)
- Smoky Hollow Township (east)
- Beulah Township (southeast)
- Crooked Lake Township (south)
- Trelipe Township (west)
- Inguadona Township (northwest)

== Demographics ==
As of the census of 2000, there were 262 people, 134 households, and 84 families residing in the township. The population density was 8.1 people per square mile (3.1/km^{2}). There were 541 housing units at an average density of 16.8/sq mi (6.5/km^{2}). The racial makeup of the township was 95.80% White, 3.44% Native American, and 0.76% from two or more races.

There were 134 households, out of which 14.9% had children under the age of 18 living with them, 55.2% were married couples living together, 5.2% had a female householder with no husband present, and 37.3% were non-families. 34.3% of all households were made up of individuals, and 14.9% had someone living alone who was 65 years of age or older. The average household size was 1.96 and the average family size was 2.38.

In the township the population was spread out, with 14.1% under the age of 18, 1.9% from 18 to 24, 16.0% from 25 to 44, 38.5% from 45 to 64, and 29.4% who were 65 years of age or older. The median age was 57 years. For every 100 females, there were 109.6 males. For every 100 females age 18 and over, there were 106.4 males.

The median income for a household in the township was $32,083, and the median income for a family was $38,750. Males had a median income of $31,563 versus $20,417 for females. The per capita income for the township was $20,111. About 5.4% of families and 8.6% of the population were below the poverty line, including 3.2% of those under the age of eighteen and 3.8% of those 65 or over.
