= Blind Lake Township, Cass County, Minnesota =

Blind Lake Township, Minnesota
- Township
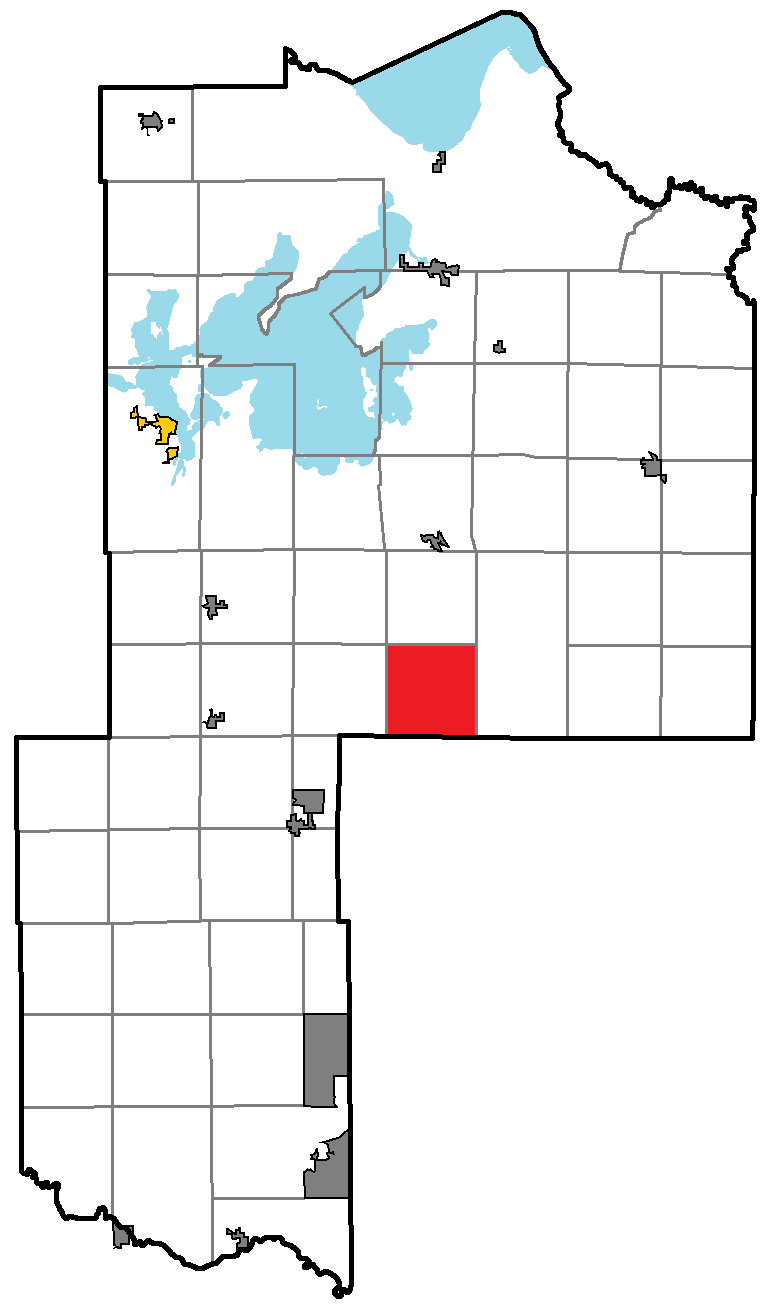
- Location of Blind Lake Township, within Cass County, Minnesota
- Coordinates: 46°50′8″N 94°13′59″W
- Country: United States
- State: Minnesota
- County: Cass

Area
  - Total: 35.4 sq mi (91.6 km^{2})
  - Land: 34.0 sq mi (88.1 km^{2})
  - Water: 1.4 sq mi (3.5 km^{2})
- Elevation: 1,391 ft (424 m)

Population (2020)
  - Total: 98
  - Density: 2.9/sq mi (1.1/km^{2})
- Time zone: UTC-6 (Central (CST))
  - Summer (DST): UTC-5 (CDT)
- ZIP code: 56474
- Area code: 218
- FIPS code: 27-06454
- GNIS feature ID: 0663613

Blind Lake Township is a township in Cass County, Minnesota, United States. The population was 98 as of the 2020 census.

== Geography ==
According to the United States Census Bureau, the township has a total area of 35.3 square miles (91 km^{2}), of which 34.0 square miles (88 km^{2}) is land and 1.3 square miles (3.4 km^{2}) (3.76%) is water.

=== Lakes ===
- Big Cranberry Lake
- Blind Lake
- Eagle Lake
- Hay Lake (east quarter)
- Lee Lake
- Lily Lake
- Little Cranberry Lake
- Lake Mc Ginty (west quarter)
- Lake Louise
- Peterson Lake
- Potshot Lake
- Stony Lake
- Swede Lake
- Tamarack Lake

=== Adjacent townships ===
- Wabedo Township (north)
- Trelipe Township (east)
- Timothy Township, Crow Wing County (south)
- Gail Lake Township, Crow Wing County (southwest)
- Ponto Lake Township (west)
- Woodrow Township (northwest)

=== Cemeteries ===
The township contains Wabedo Cemetery.

== Demographics ==
As of the census of 2000, there were 88 people, 31 households, and 20 families residing in the township. The population density was 2.6 inhabitants per square mile (1.0/km^{2}). There were 90 housing units at an average density of 2.6 per square mile (1.0/km^{2}). The racial makeup of the township was 95.45% White, and 4.55% from two or more races.

There were 31 households, out of which 41.9% had children under the age of 18 living with them, 64.5% were married couples living together, 3.2% had a female householder with no husband present, and 32.3% were non-families. 32.3% of all households were made up of individuals, and 12.9% had someone living alone who was 65 years of age or older. The average household size was 2.84 and the average family size was 3.71.

In the township the population was spread out, with 40.9% under the age of 18, 2.3% from 18 to 24, 29.5% from 25 to 44, 12.5% from 45 to 64, and 14.8% who were 65 years of age or older. The median age was 34 years. For every 100 females, there were 114.6 males. For every 100 females age 18 and over, there were 108.0 males.

The median income for a household in the township was $19,250, and the median income for a family was $21,875. Males had a median income of $13,750 versus $18,542 for females. The per capita income for the township was $6,420. There were 21.7% of families and 20.4% of the population living below the poverty line, including 13.7% of under eighteens and none of those over 64.
