= Gould Township, Cass County, Minnesota =

Gould Township, Minnesota
- Township
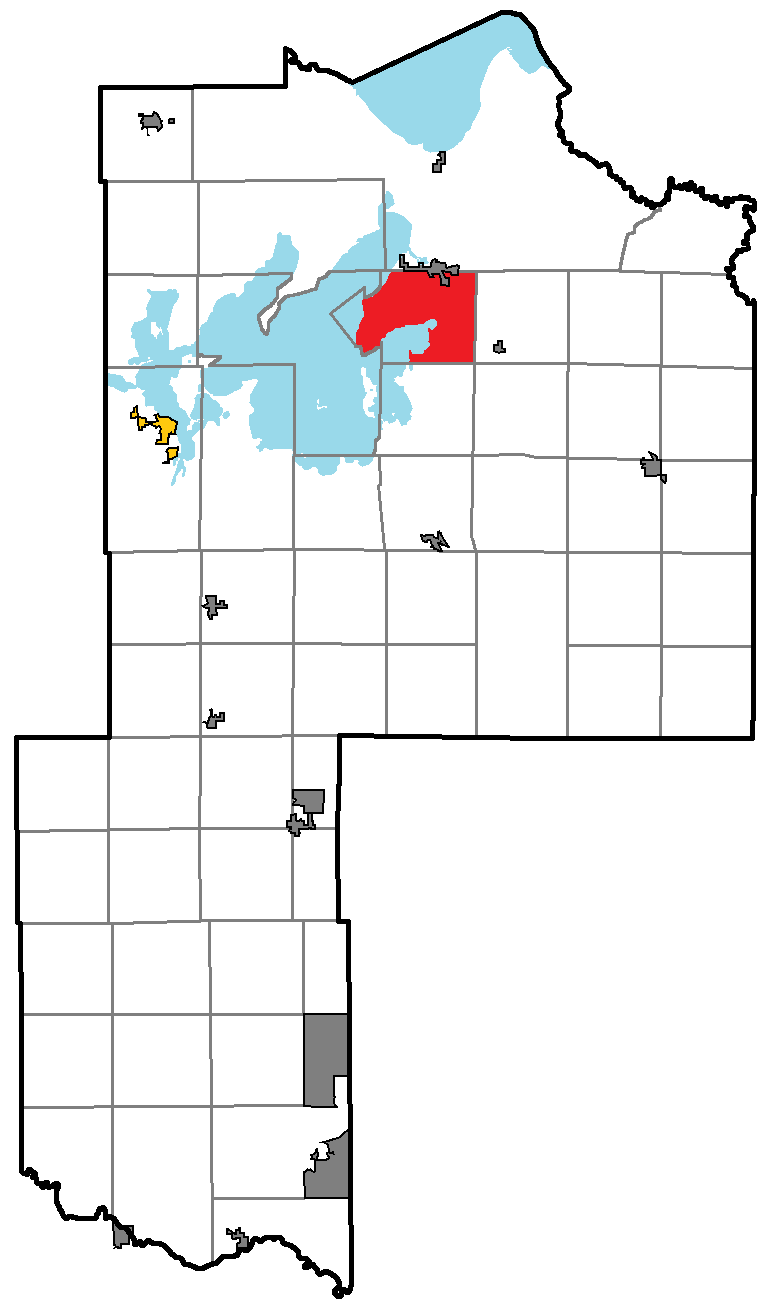
- Location of Gould Township, within Cass County, Minnesota
- Coordinates: 47°11′49″N 94°13′48″W
- Country: United States
- State: Minnesota
- County: Cass

Area
  - Total: 44.2 sq mi (114.6 km^{2})
  - Land: 33.4 sq mi (86.5 km^{2})
  - Water: 10.8 sq mi (28.0 km^{2})
- Elevation: 1,299 ft (396 m)

Population (2020)
  - Total: 232
  - Density: 6.95/sq mi (2.68/km^{2})
- Time zone: UTC-6 (Central (CST))
  - Summer (DST): UTC-5 (CDT)
- FIPS code: 27-24686
- GNIS feature ID: 0664302

Gould Township is a township in Cass County, Minnesota, United States. The population was 232 as of the 2020 census. Gould Township was named for M. I. Gould, a lumberman and local landowner.

== Geography ==
According to the United States Census Bureau, the township has a total area of 44.2 square miles (114 km^{2}), of which 33.4 square miles (87 km^{2}) is land and 10.8 square miles (28 km^{2}) (24.48%) is water.

The south quarter of the city of Federal Dam is located within Gould Township geographically but is a separate entity.

=== Lakes ===
- Bobolink Lake
- Leech Lake (east edge)

=== Adjacent townships ===
- Boy River Township (east)
- Rogers Township (southeast)
- Boy Lake Township (south)
- Otter Tail Peninsula Township (northwest)

=== Cemeteries ===
The township contains the following cemeteries: Island Zion and White Cloud.

== Demographics ==
As of the census of 2000, there were 249 people, 95 households, and 66 families residing in the township. The population density was 7.5 inhabitants per square mile (2.9/km^{2}). There were 196 housing units at an average density of 5.9 per square mile (2.3/km^{2}). The racial makeup of the township was 38.55% White, 58.23% Native American, and 3.21% from two or more races. Hispanic or Latino of any race were 1.20% of the population.

There were 95 households, out of which 34.7% had children under the age of 18 living with them, 40.0% were married couples living together, 17.9% had a female householder with no husband present, and 29.5% were non-families. 22.1% of all households were made up of individuals, and 8.4% had someone living alone who was 65 years of age or older. The average household size was 2.62 and the average family size was 2.97.

In the township the population was spread out, with 28.5% under the age of 18, 8.4% from 18 to 24, 25.7% from 25 to 44, 24.9% from 45 to 64, and 12.4% who were 65 years of age or older. The median age was 37 years. For every 100 females, there were 99.2 males. For every 100 females age 18 and over, there were 109.4 males.

The median income for a household in the township was $17,813, and the median income for a family was $25,536. Males had a median income of $27,708 versus $17,813 for females. The per capita income for the township was $9,813. About 34.9% of families and 42.8% of the population were below the poverty line, including 58.8% of those under the age of eighteen and 26.3% of those 65 or over.
