= Wabedo Lake =

Lake in the state of Minnesota, United States

- Location within Minnesota
- Location: Cass County, Minnesota
- Coordinates: 46°54′19″N 94°13′35″W
- Type: lake
- Surface area: 1,185 acres (480 ha)
- Max. depth: 95 feet (29 m)

Wabedo Lake is a lake in Cass County, Minnesota, in the United States.

== Overview ==
Wabedo Lake was named for an Ojibwe warrior killed by Sioux.

The Wabedo Lake is 1,185 acres (480 ha) in size and it is approximately 95 feet (29 m) deep at its deepest point. Wabedo Lake is located 4.5 miles (7.2 km) south of Longville off of Highway 54. Anglers, a person who fishes with a rod and line, can anticipate to catch 15 different types of fish. These 15 different fish species are: Black Bullhead, Black Crappie, Bluegill, Brown Bullhead, Largemouth Bass, Muskellunge (Muskie), Northern Pike, Pumpkinseed, Rock Bass, Smallmouth Bass, Walleye, White Sucker, Yellow Bullhead and Yellow Perch.

Wabedo Lake is the setting and inspiration for the Charley Wagner song "Queen of Wabedo" off of his album "Unknown Man".

== See also ==
- List of lakes in Minnesota
