= Smoky Hollow Township, Cass County, Minnesota =

Smoky Hollow Township, Minnesota
- Township
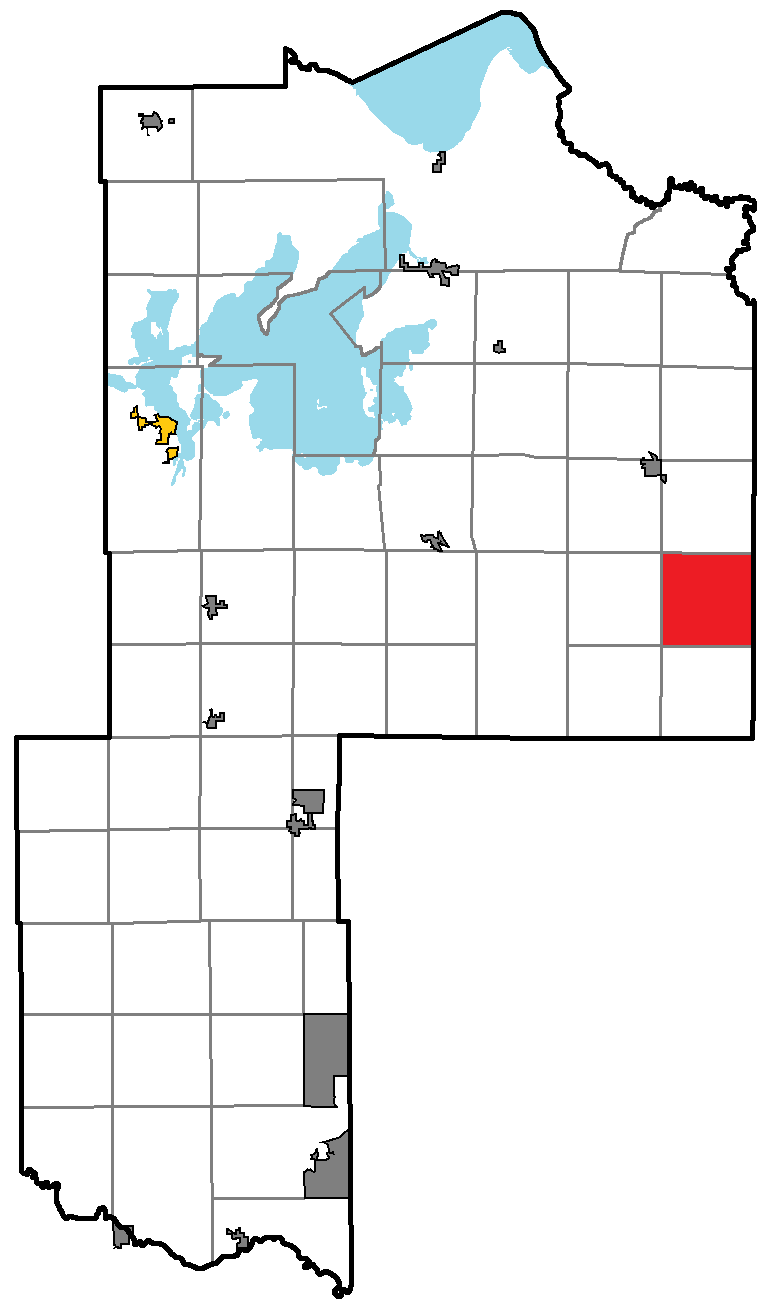
- Location of Smoky Hollow Township, within Cass County, Minnesota
- Coordinates: 46°56′38″N 93°50′59″W
- Country: United States
- State: Minnesota
- County: Cass

Area
  - Total: 36.1 sq mi (93.4 km^{2})
  - Land: 34.8 sq mi (90.2 km^{2})
  - Water: 1.3 sq mi (3.3 km^{2})
- Elevation: 1,391 ft (424 m)

Population (2020)
  - Total: 55
  - Density: 1.6/sq mi (0.61/km^{2})
- Time zone: UTC-6 (Central (CST))
  - Summer (DST): UTC-5 (CDT)
- ZIP code: 56672
- Area code: 218
- FIPS code: 27-60970
- GNIS feature ID: 0665636

Smoky Hollow Township is a township in Cass County, Minnesota, United States. The population was 55 as of the 2020 census.

== Geography ==
According to the United States Census Bureau, the township has a total area of 36.1 square miles (93.4 km^{2}), of which 34.8 square miles (90.2 km^{2}) is land and 1.3 square miles (3.3 km^{2}) (3.52%) is water.

=== Lakes ===
- Ahsebun Lake
- Baker Lake
- Buck Lake
- Cedar Lake
- Kelly Lake
- Little Goose Lake
- Little Thunder Lake
- Lake On Three
- Loon Lake
- Michaud Lake (east three-quarters)
- Whiskey Lake
- White Oak Lake
- Windy Lake

=== Adjacent townships ===
- Lima Township (north)
- Beulah Township (south)
- Crooked Lake Township (southwest)
- Thunder Lake Township (west)

=== Cemeteries ===
The township contains Lakeview Cemetery.

== Demographics ==
As of the census of 2000, there were 61 people, 28 households, and 18 families residing in the township. The population density was 1.8 people per square mile (0.7/km^{2}). There were 109 housing units at an average density of 3.1/sq mi (1.2/km^{2}). The racial makeup of the township was 98.36% White and 1.64% Native American.

There were 28 households, out of which 21.4% had children under the age of 18 living with them, 46.4% were married couples living together, 3.6% had a female householder with no husband present, and 35.7% were non-families. 32.1% of all households were made up of individuals, and 10.7% had someone living alone who was 65 years of age or older. The average household size was 2.18 and the average family size was 2.78.

In the township the population was spread out, with 21.3% under the age of 18, 3.3% from 18 to 24, 16.4% from 25 to 44, 44.3% from 45 to 64, and 14.8% who were 65 years of age or older. The median age was 49 years. For every 100 females, there were 154.2 males. For every 100 females age 18 and over, there were 140.0 males.

The median income for a household in the township was $21,875, and the median income for a family was $21,875. Males had a median income of $65,417 versus $13,750 for females. The per capita income for the township was $15,042. There were no families and 10.4% of the population living below the poverty line, including no under eighteens and 18.8% of those over 64.
