= Slater Township, Cass County, Minnesota =

Slater Township, Minnesota
- Township
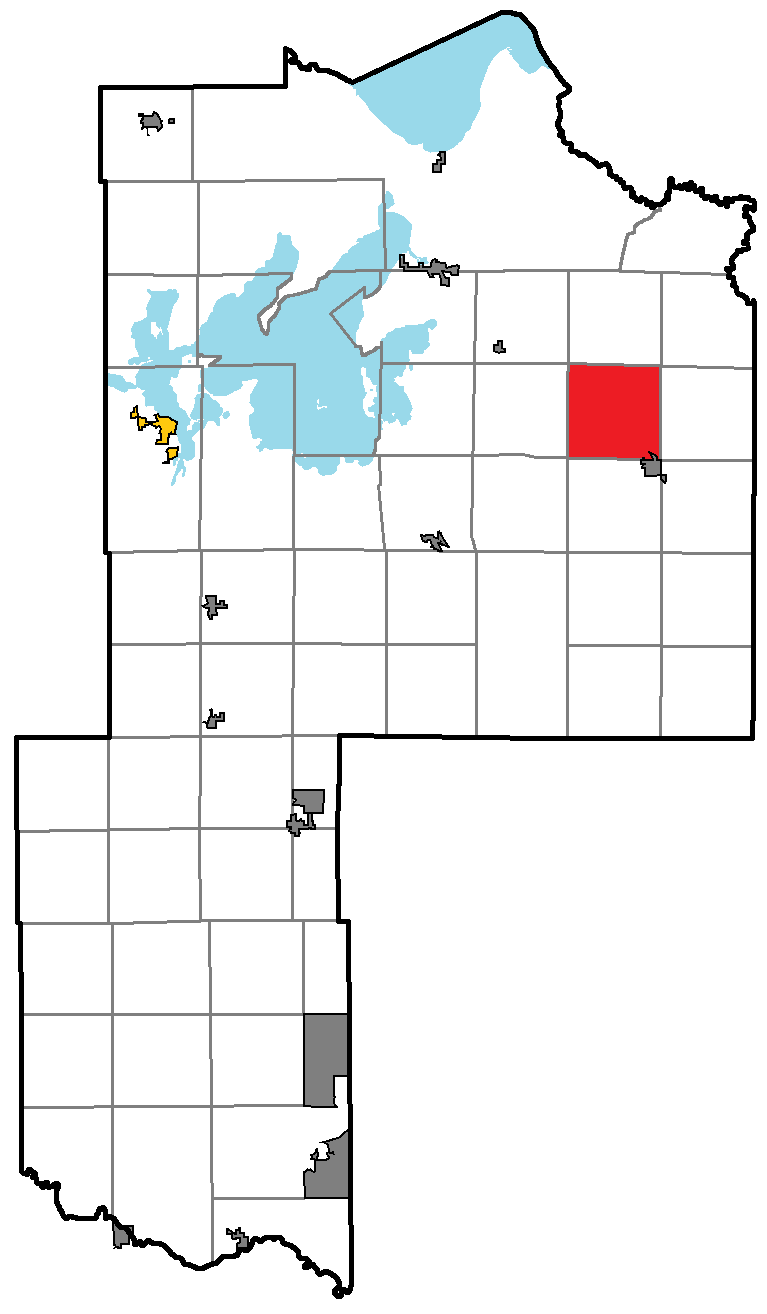
- Location of Slater Township, within Cass County, Minnesota
- Coordinates: 47°6′45″N 93°56′18″W
- Country: United States
- State: Minnesota
- County: Cass

Area
  - Total: 36.7 sq mi (95.0 km^{2})
  - Land: 33.9 sq mi (87.8 km^{2})
  - Water: 2.8 sq mi (7.3 km^{2})
- Elevation: 1,371 ft (418 m)

Population (2020)
  - Total: 201
  - Density: 5.93/sq mi (2.29/km^{2})
- Time zone: UTC-6 (Central (CST))
  - Summer (DST): UTC-5 (CDT)
- ZIP code: 56672
- Area code: 218
- FIPS code: 27-60790
- GNIS feature ID: 0665630

Slater Township is a township in Cass County, Minnesota, United States. The population was 201 as of the 2020 census. Slater Township was named for David H. Slater, a farmer who settled there.

== Geography ==
According to the United States Census Bureau, the township has a total area of 36.7 square miles (95.0 km^{2}), of which 33.9 square miles (87.8 km^{2}) is land and 2.8 square miles (7.3 km^{2}) (7.63%) is water.

The northwest edge of the city of Remer is located within Slater Township geographically but is a separate entity.

=== Lakes ===
- Bebow Lake
- Big Sand Lake (north half)
- Cedar Lake
- Dewey Lake
- Dirty Nose Lake (west half)
- Folston Lake (west edge)
- Grass Lake
- Grave Lake
- Green Lake
- Knight Lake
- Little Mud Lake (west edge)
- Little Sand Lake
- Lower Milton Lake
- Mink Lake
- Moon Lake (northeast quarter)
- Sullivan Lake
- Tamarack Lake
- Taylor Lake (southeast half)
- Tidd Lake
- Upper Milton Lake
- Wahneshin Lake
- Wilson Lake
- Zimmerman Lake

=== Adjacent townships ===
- Salem Township (north)
- Torrey Township (northeast)
- Lima Township (southeast)
- Remer Township (south)
- Inguadona Township (southwest)
- Rogers Township (west)
- Boy River Township (northwest)

== Demographics ==
As of the census of 2000, there were 249 people, 92 households, and 64 families residing in the township. The population density was 7.3 people per square mile (2.8/km^{2}). There were 175 housing units at an average density of 5.2/sq mi (2.0/km^{2}). The racial makeup of the township was 91.16% White, 2.81% Native American, 0.80% Asian, 1.20% from other races, and 4.02% from two or more races. Hispanic or Latino of any race were 1.61% of the population.

There were 92 households, out of which 22.8% had children under the age of 18 living with them, 62.0% were married couples living together, 6.5% had a female householder with no husband present, and 30.4% were non-families. 26.1% of all households were made up of individuals, and 12.0% had someone living alone who was 65 years of age or older. The average household size was 2.38 and the average family size was 2.88.

In the township the population was spread out, with 31.3% under the age of 18, 6.0% from 18 to 24, 20.5% from 25 to 44, 27.7% from 45 to 64, and 14.5% who were 65 years of age or older. The median age was 41 years. For every 100 females, there were 74.1 males. For every 100 females age 18 and over, there were 94.3 males.

The median income for a household in the township was $26,932, and the median income for a family was $30,625. Males had a median income of $30,938 versus $18,500 for females. The per capita income for the township was $13,941. About 13.3% of families and 23.5% of the population were below the poverty line, including 29.6% of those under the age of eighteen and 7.3% of those 65 or over.
