= Inguadona Township, Cass County, Minnesota =

Inguadona Township, Minnesota
- Township
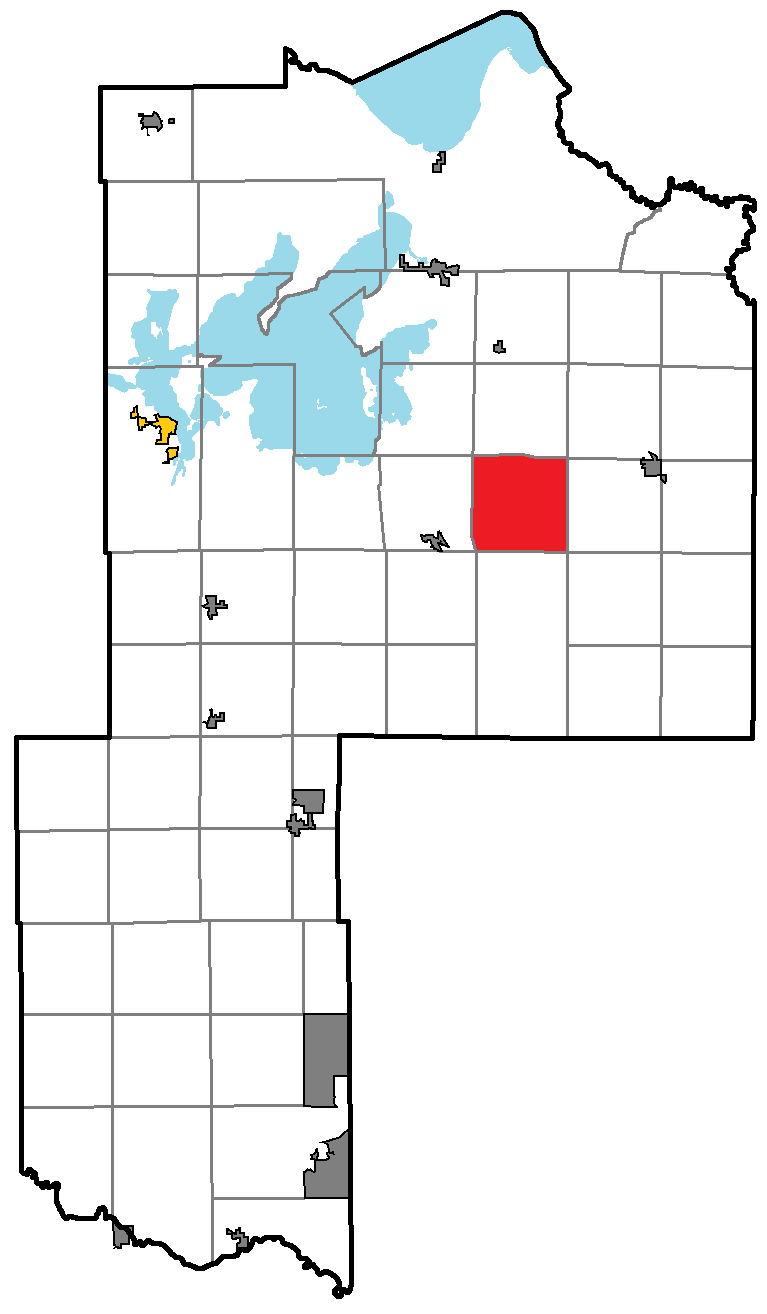
- Location of Inguadona Township, within Cass County, Minnesota
- Coordinates: 47°0′47″N 94°4′21″W
- Country: United States
- State: Minnesota
- County: Cass

Area
  - Total: 38.1 sq mi (98.8 km^{2})
  - Land: 34.6 sq mi (89.7 km^{2})
  - Water: 3.5 sq mi (9.1 km^{2})
- Elevation: 1,325 ft (404 m)

Population (2020)
  - Total: 176
  - Density: 5.08/sq mi (1.96/km^{2})
- Time zone: UTC-6 (Central (CST))
  - Summer (DST): UTC-5 (CDT)
- ZIP code: 56655
- Area code: 218
- FIPS code: 27-30986
- GNIS feature ID: 0664546

Inguadona Township is a township in Cass County, Minnesota, United States. The population was 176 as of the 2020 census. Inguadona is a name probably derived from an unidentified Native American language.

== Geography ==
According to the United States Census Bureau, the township has a total area of 38.1 square miles (99 km^{2}), of which 34.6 square miles (90 km^{2}) is land and 3.5 square miles (9.1 km^{2}) (9.23%) is water.

=== Unincorporated communities ===
- Inguadona

=== Major highway ===
- Minnesota State Highway 200

=== Lakes ===
- Cedar Lake
- Ford Lake (vast majority)
- Inguadona Lake
- Inguadona Lake (north edge)
- Johnson Lake
- Laura Lake (west edge)
- Long Lake (east quarter)
- Lost Girl Lake
- Lower Trelipe Lake
- Mabel Lake
- Peterson Lake (west three-quarters)
- Phelon Lake
- Twin Lakes
- Upper Trelipe Lake (northwest quarter)
- Wax Lake

=== Adjacent townships ===
- Rogers Township (north)
- Slater Township (northeast)
- Remer Township (east)
- Thunder Lake Township (southeast)
- Trelipe Township (south)
- Wabedo Township (southwest)
- Kego Township (west)
- Boy Lake Township (northwest)

=== Cemeteries ===
The township contains Salem Lutheran Cemetery.

== Demographics ==
As of the census of 2000, there were 190 people, 86 households, and 62 families residing in the township. The population density was 5.5 inhabitants per square mile (2.1/km^{2}). There were 213 housing units at an average density of 6.2 per square mile (2.4/km^{2}). The racial makeup of the township was 95.79% White, 1.05% Native American, and 3.16% from two or more races.

There were 86 households, out of which 12.8% had children under the age of 18 living with them, 62.8% were married couples living together, 7.0% had a female householder with no husband present, and 27.9% were non-families. 24.4% of all households were made up of individuals, and 10.5% had someone living alone who was 65 years of age or older. The average household size was 2.21 and the average family size was 2.45.

In the township the population was spread out, with 16.3% under the age of 18, 3.2% from 18 to 24, 16.3% from 25 to 44, 28.9% from 45 to 64, and 35.3% who were 65 years of age or older. The median age was 56 years. For every 100 females, there were 97.9 males. For every 100 females age 18 and over, there were 103.8 males.

The median income for a household in the township was $34,375, and the median income for a family was $36,500. Males had a median income of $29,375 versus $23,750 for females. The per capita income for the township was $29,501. About 3.2% of families and 5.9% of the population were below the poverty line, including none of those under the age of eighteen and 6.3% of those 65 or over.
