= Trelipe Township, Cass County, Minnesota =

Trelipe Township, Minnesota
- Township
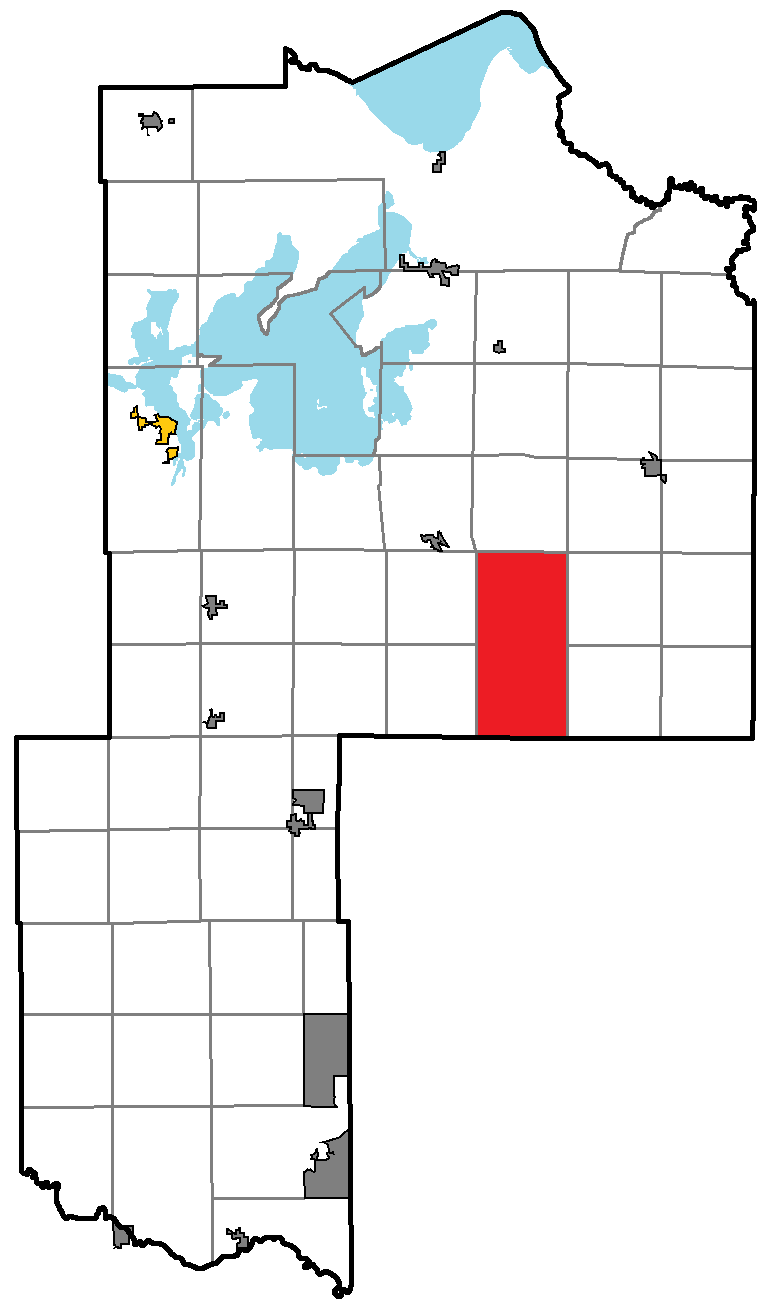
- Location of Trelipe Township, within Cass County, Minnesota
- Coordinates: 46°54′31″N 94°4′38″W
- Country: United States
- State: Minnesota
- County: Cass

Area
  - Total: 70.9 sq mi (183.6 km^{2})
  - Land: 66.8 sq mi (172.9 km^{2})
  - Water: 4.1 sq mi (10.7 km^{2})
- Elevation: 1,348 ft (411 m)

Population (2020)
  - Total: 183
  - Density: 2.74/sq mi (1.06/km^{2})
- Time zone: UTC-6 (Central (CST))
  - Summer (DST): UTC-5 (CDT)
- ZIP code: 56662
- Area code: 218
- FIPS code: 27-65434
- GNIS feature ID: 0665806

Trelipe Township is a township in Cass County, Minnesota, United States. The population was 183 as of the 2020 census. Trelipe Township was named for the freshwater fish Coregonus artedi, commonly known as the tullibee.

== Geography ==
According to the United States Census Bureau, the township has a total area of 70.9 square miles (183.6 km^{2}), of which 66.8 square miles (172.9 km^{2}) is land and 4.1 square miles (10.6 km^{2}) (5.80%) is water.

=== Lakes ===
- Blueberry Lake
- Boiler Lake
- Camp Lake
- Charles Lake (east half)
- Cranberry Lake
- Echo Lake
- First Dog Lake
- Hoister Lake
- Inguadona Lake (vast majority)
- Island Lake (southwest three-quarters)
- Lake George (west quarter)
- Lake Mc Ginty (northeast three-quarters)
- Lake Twentysix
- Mitten Lake
- Oconner Lake (west quarter)
- Pistol Lake
- Second Dog Lake
- Stevens Lake
- Upper Trelipe Lake (southwest half)
- West Dog Lake
- Woodcamp Lake

=== Adjacent townships ===
- Inguadona Township (north)
- Remer Township (northeast)
- Crooked Lake Township (east)
- Thunder Lake Township (east)
- Timothy Township, Crow Wing County (southwest)
- Blind Lake Township (west)
- Wabedo Township (west)

== Demographics ==
As of the census of 2000, there were 174 people, 81 households, and 52 families residing in the township. The population density was 2.6 people per square mile (1.0/km^{2}). There were 271 housing units at an average density of 4.1/sq mi (1.6/km^{2}). The racial makeup of the township was 98.28% White and 1.72% Native American.

There were 81 households, out of which 14.8% had children under the age of 18 living with them, 53.1% were married couples living together, 4.9% had a female householder with no husband present, and 35.8% were non-families. 28.4% of all households were made up of individuals, and 13.6% had someone living alone who was 65 years of age or older. The average household size was 2.15 and the average family size was 2.44.

In the township the population was spread out, with 13.8% under the age of 18, 5.7% from 18 to 24, 22.4% from 25 to 44, 33.9% from 45 to 64, and 24.1% who were 65 years of age or older. The median age was 52 years. For every 100 females, there were 91.2 males. For every 100 females age 18 and over, there were 100.0 males.

The median income for a household in the township was $30,208, and the median income for a family was $36,875. Males had a median income of $29,167 versus $14,375 for females. The per capita income for the township was $16,671. About 9.5% of families and 14.1% of the population were below the poverty line, including 22.2% of those under the age of eighteen and 23.5% of those 65 or over.
