= Boy Lake Township, Cass County, Minnesota =

Boy Lake Township, Minnesota
- Township
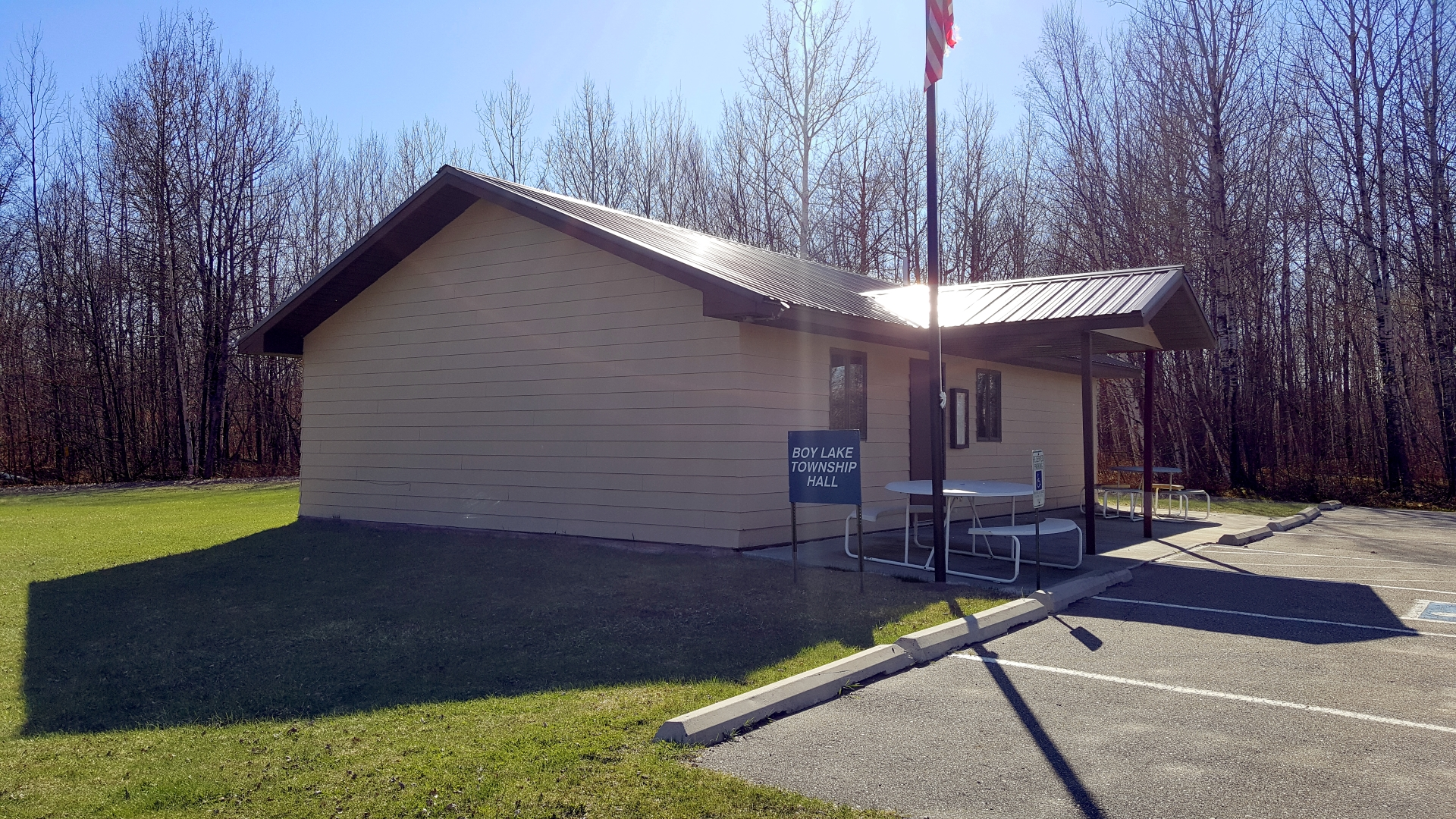
- Boy Lake Township Hall, Cass County, MN

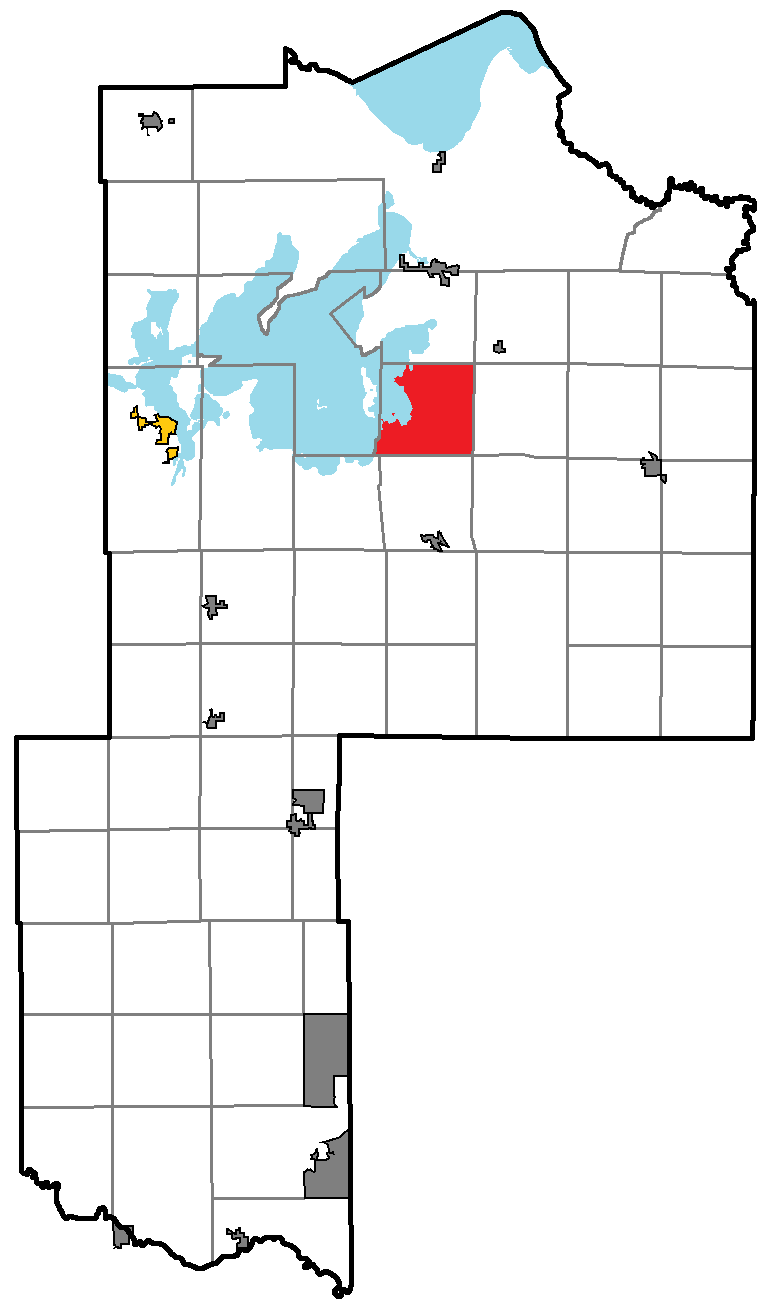
- Location of Boy Lake Township, within Cass County, Minnesota
- Coordinates: 47°5′48″N 94°11′47″W
- Country: United States
- State: Minnesota
- County: Cass

Area
  - Total: 36.3 sq mi (94.1 km^{2})
  - Land: 27.6 sq mi (71.5 km^{2})
  - Water: 8.7 sq mi (22.6 km^{2})
- Elevation: 1,296 ft (395 m)

Population (2020)
  - Total: 210
  - Density: 7.6/sq mi (2.9/km^{2})
- Time zone: UTC-6 (Central (CST))
  - Summer (DST): UTC-5 (CDT)
- ZIP code: 56655
- Area code: 218
- FIPS code: 27-07156
- GNIS feature ID: 0663642

Boy Lake Township is a township in Cass County, Minnesota, United States. The population was 210 as of the 2020 census. This township took its name from Boy Lake.

== Geography ==
According to the United States Census Bureau, the township has a total area of 36.3 square miles (94 km^{2}), of which 27.6 square miles (71 km^{2}) is land and 8.7 square miles (23 km^{2}) (24.01%) is water.

=== Unincorporated communities ===
- Brevik

=== Lakes ===
- Aultman Lake
- Boy Lake (west quarter)
- Camp Lake
- Current Lake
- Hougan Lake
- Iverson Lake
- Leech Lake (east edge)
- Mad Dog Lake
- Town Line Lake (north half)

=== Adjacent townships ===
- Gould Township (north)
- Boy River Township (northeast)
- Rogers Township (east)
- Inguadona Township (southeast)
- Kego Township (south)
- Pine Lake Township (southwest)

== Demographics ==
As of the census of 2000, there were 132 people, 58 households, and 36 families residing in the township. The population density was 4.8 inhabitants per square mile (1.9/km^{2}). There were 204 housing units at an average density of 7.4 per square mile (2.9/km^{2}). The racial makeup of the township was 81.82% White, 0.76% African American, 6.82% Native American, 0.76% Asian, and 9.85% from two or more races. Hispanic or Latino of any race were 1.52% of the population.

There were 58 households, out of which 19.0% had children under the age of 18 living with them, 53.4% were married couples living together, 6.9% had a female householder with no husband present, and 37.9% were non-families. 29.3% of all households were made up of individuals, and 20.7% had someone living alone who was 65 years of age or older. The average household size was 2.28 and the average family size was 2.81.

In the township the population was spread out, with 16.7% under the age of 18, 4.5% from 18 to 24, 22.7% from 25 to 44, 29.5% from 45 to 64, and 26.5% who were 65 years of age or older. The median age was 48 years. For every 100 females, there were 116.4 males. For every 100 females age 18 and over, there were 115.7 males.

The median income for a household in the township was $37,500, and the median income for a family was $36,250. Males had a median income of $34,583 versus $21,250 for females. The per capita income for the township was $20,070. There were 27.8% of families and 26.7% of the population living below the poverty line, including 68.8% of under eighteens and 6.7% of those over 64.
