= Salem Township, Cass County, Minnesota =

Salem Township, Minnesota
- Township
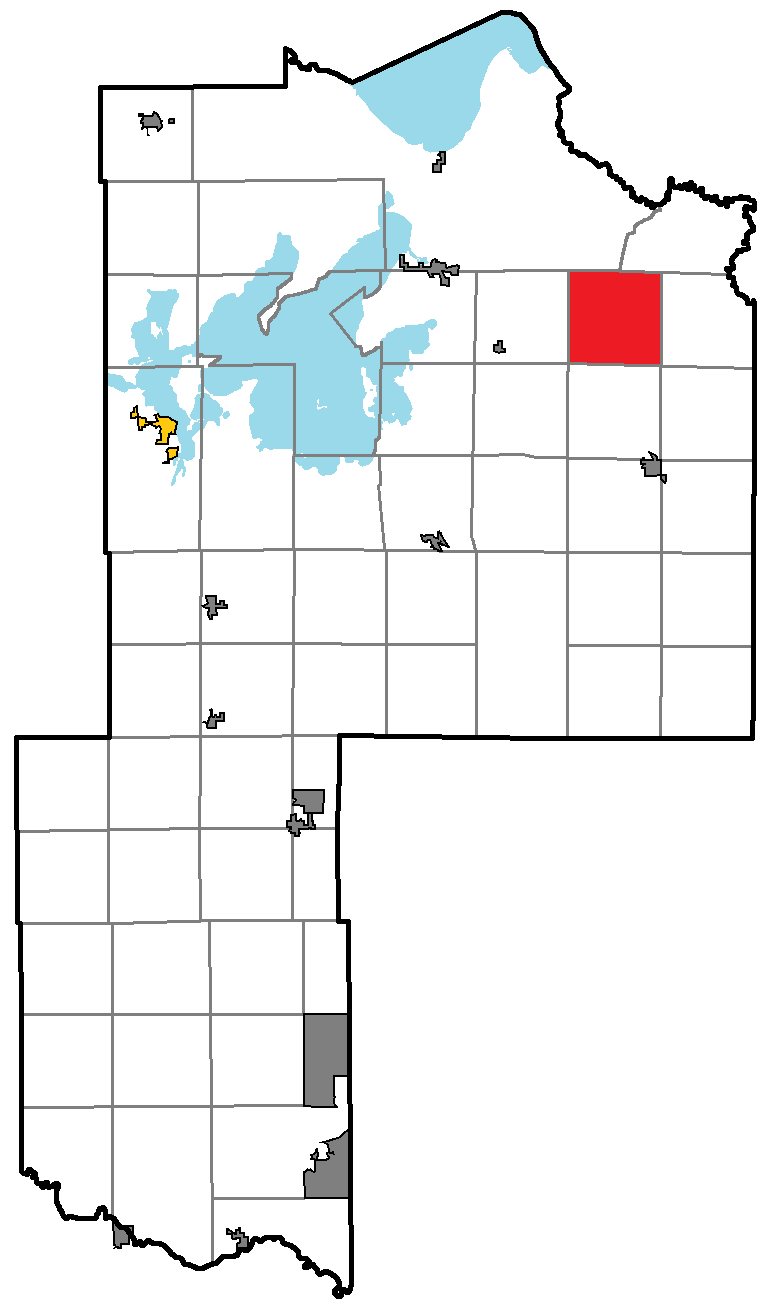
- Location of Salem Township, within Cass County, Minnesota
- Coordinates: 47°10′3″N 93°59′21″W
- Country: United States
- State: Minnesota
- County: Cass

Area
  - Total: 36.4 sq mi (94.2 km^{2})
  - Land: 35.1 sq mi (90.9 km^{2})
  - Water: 1.3 sq mi (3.3 km^{2})
- Elevation: 1,332 ft (406 m)

Population (2020)
  - Total: 115
  - Density: 3.28/sq mi (1.27/km^{2})
- Time zone: UTC-6 (Central (CST))
  - Summer (DST): UTC-5 (CDT)
- FIPS code: 27-58216
- GNIS feature ID: 0665537

Salem Township is a township in Cass County, Minnesota, United States. The population was 115 at the 2020 census.

== Geography ==
According to the United States Census Bureau, the township has a total area of 36.4 square miles (94.2 km^{2}), of which 35.1 square miles (90.9 km^{2}) is land and 1.3 square miles (3.3 km^{2}) (3.54%) is water.

=== Unincorporated community ===
- Elevenmile Corner

=== Lakes ===
- Chain O Lakes
- Goose Lake
- Lower Menton Lake
- Taylor Lake (northeast half)
- Upper Menton Lake

=== Adjacent townships ===
- Torrey Township (east)
- Slater Township (south)
- Rogers Township (southwest)
- Boy River Township (west)

== Demographics ==
At the 2000 census, there were 78 people, 33 households and 23 families living in the township. The population density was 2.2 per square mile (0.9/km^{2}). There were 54 housing units at an average density of 1.5/sq mi (0.6/km^{2}). The racial makeup of the township was 97.44% White and 2.56% Native American.

There were 33 households, of which 24.2% had children under the age of 18 living with them, 69.7% were married couples living together, and 30.3% were non-families. 30.3% of all households were made up of individuals, and 18.2% had someone living alone who was 65 years of age or older. The average household size was 2.36 and the average family size was 2.96.

19.2% of the population were under the age of 18, 7.7% from 18 to 24, 17.9% from 25 to 44, 37.2% from 45 to 64, and 17.9% who were 65 years of age or older. The median age was 47 years. For every 100 females, there were 136.4 males. For every 100 females age 18 and over, there were 125.0 males.

The median household income was $52,500 and the median family income was $48,125. Males had a median income of $19,250 compared with $12,344 for females. The per capita income for the township was $18,322. None of the population and none of the families were below the poverty line.
