= Torrey Township, Cass County, Minnesota =

Torrey Township, Minnesota
- Township
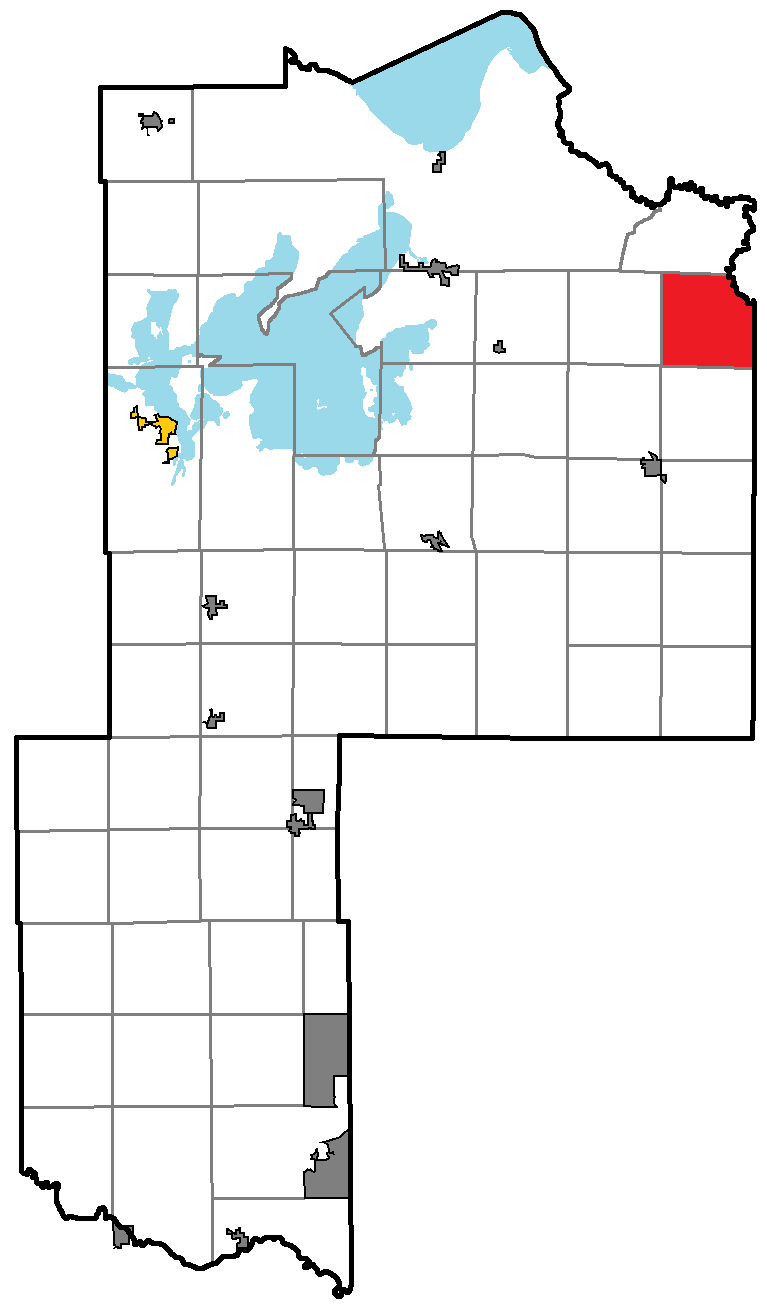
- Location of Torrey Township, within Cass County, Minnesota
- Coordinates: 47°11′8″N 93°50′39″W
- Country: United States
- State: Minnesota
- County: Cass

Area
  - Total: 34.2 sq mi (88.6 km^{2})
  - Land: 31.8 sq mi (82.4 km^{2})
  - Water: 2.4 sq mi (6.2 km^{2})
- Elevation: 1,276 ft (389 m)

Population (2020)
  - Total: 164
  - Density: 5.15/sq mi (1.99/km^{2})
- Time zone: UTC-6 (Central (CST))
  - Summer (DST): UTC-5 (CDT)
- FIPS code: 27-65254
- GNIS feature ID: 0665800

Torrey Township is a township in Cass County, Minnesota, United States. The population was 164 as of the 2020 census.

== Geography ==
According to the United States Census Bureau, the township has a total area of 34.2 square miles (88.6 km^{2}), of which 31.8 square miles (82.4 km^{2}) is land and 2.4 square miles (6.2 km^{2}) (6.99%) is water.

=== Major highway ===
- Minnesota State Highway 6

=== Lakes ===
- Camel Lake
- Dead Horse Lake
- Johnson Lake
- Little Skunk Lake
- Little Vermillion Lake
- Lake Sixteen
- Skunk Lake
- Sugar Lake (vast majority)
- Vermillion Lake
- Willow Lake (west three-quarters)

=== Adjacent townships ===
- Morse Township, Itasca County (north)
- Slater Township (southwest)
- Salem Township (west)

== Demographics ==
As of the census of 2000, there were 122 people, 57 households, and 42 families living in the township. The population density was 3.8 people per square mile (1.5/km^{2}). There were 172 housing units at an average density of 5.4/sq mi (2.1/km^{2}). The racial makeup of the township was 97.54% White and 2.46% Native American.

There were 57 households, out of which 14.0% had children under the age of 18 living with them, 66.7% were married couples living together, 3.5% had a female householder with no husband present, and 26.3% were non-families. 19.3% of all households were made up of individuals, and 8.8% had someone living alone who was 65 years of age or older. The average household size was 2.14 and the average family size was 2.38.

In the township the population was spread out, with 13.9% under the age of 18, 3.3% from 18 to 24, 19.7% from 25 to 44, 41.0% from 45 to 64, and 22.1% who were 65 years of age or older. The median age was 52 years. For every 100 females, there were 106.8 males. For every 100 females age 18 and over, there were 105.9 males.

The median income for a household in the township was $35,714, and the median income for a family was $37,321. Males had a median income of $39,000 versus $16,875 for females. The per capita income for the township was $18,231. There were 5.7% of families and 3.7% of the population living below the poverty line, including no under eighteens and none of those over 64.
