= Boy River Township, Cass County, Minnesota =

Boy River Township, Minnesota
- Township
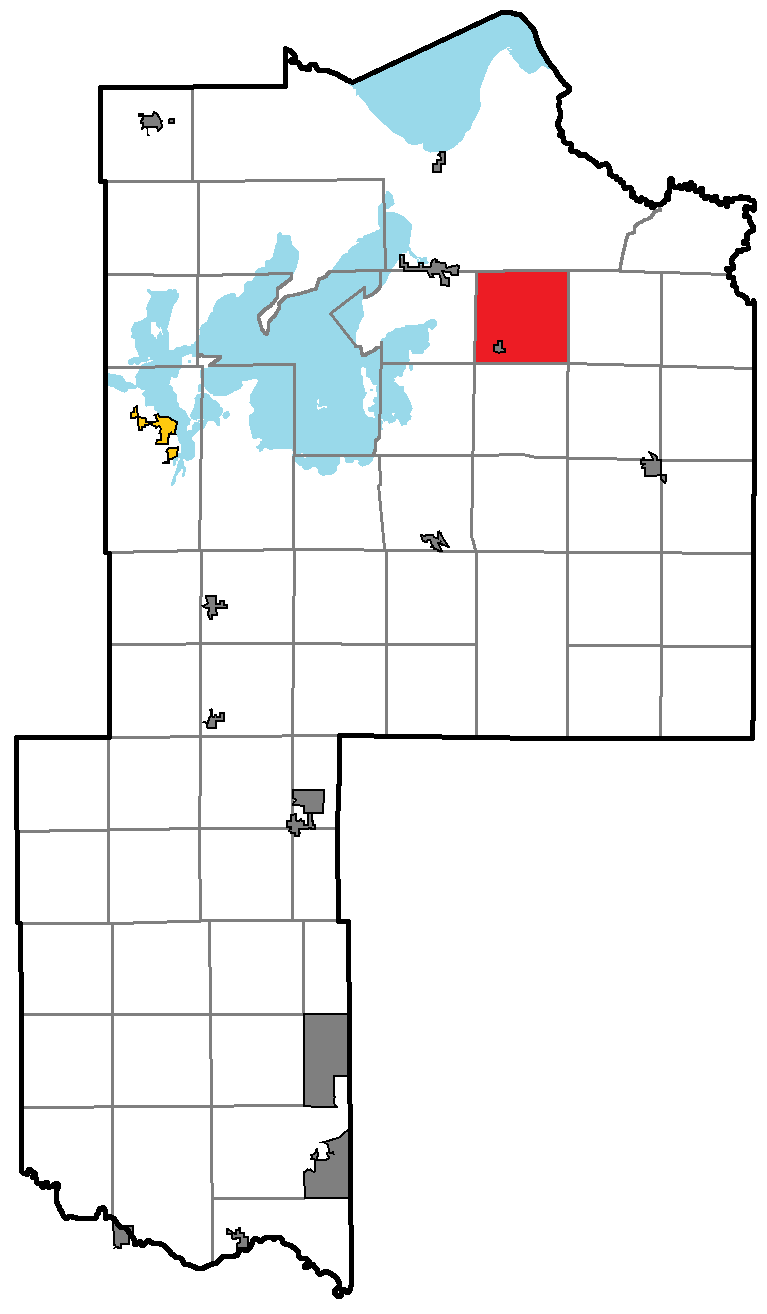
- Location of Boy River Township, within Cass County, Minnesota
- Coordinates: 47°10′53″N 94°7′36″W
- Country: United States
- State: Minnesota
- County: Cass

Area
  - Total: 35.9 sq mi (93.0 km^{2})
  - Land: 35.6 sq mi (92.3 km^{2})
  - Water: 0.27 sq mi (0.7 km^{2})
- Elevation: 1,309 ft (399 m)

Population (2020)
  - Total: 56
  - Density: 1.6/sq mi (0.61/km^{2})
- Time zone: UTC-6 (Central (CST))
  - Summer (DST): UTC-5 (CDT)
- ZIP code: 56672
- Area code: 218
- FIPS code: 27-07192
- GNIS feature ID: 0663644

Boy River Township is a township in Cass County, Minnesota, United States. The population was 56 as of the 2020 census. This township took its name from the Boy River.

== Geography ==
According to the United States Census Bureau, the township has a total area of 35.9 square miles (93 km^{2}), of which 35.6 square miles (92 km^{2}) is land and 0.3 square miles (0.78 km^{2}) (0.75%) is water.

The city of Boy River is located entirely within Boy River Township geographically but is a separate entity.

=== Lakes ===
- Skelly Lake (northeast half)

=== Adjacent townships ===
- Salem Township (east)
- Slater Township (southeast)
- Rogers Township (south)
- Boy Lake Township (southwest)
- Gould Township (west)

=== Cemeteries ===
The township contains Arlington Cemetery.

== Demographics ==
As of the census of 2000, there were 100 people, 36 households, and 23 families residing in the township. The population density was 2.8 inhabitants per square mile (1.1/km^{2}). There were 45 housing units at an average density of 1.3 per square mile (0.50/km^{2}). The racial makeup of the township was 90.00% White, 7.00% Native American, and 3.00% from two or more races.

There were 36 households, out of which 27.8% had children under the age of 18 living with them, 50.0% were married couples living together, 8.3% had a female householder with no husband present, and 36.1% were non-families. 30.6% of all households were made up of individuals, and 22.2% had someone living alone who was 65 years of age or older. The average household size was 2.78 and the average family size was 3.48.

In the township the population was spread out, with 34.0% under the age of 18, 2.0% from 18 to 24, 26.0% from 25 to 44, 25.0% from 45 to 64, and 13.0% who were 65 years of age or older. The median age was 37 years. For every 100 females, there were 122.2 males. For every 100 females age 18 and over, there were 106.3 males.

The median income for a household in the township was $19,500, and the median income for a family was $31,000. Males had a median income of $35,625 versus $25,417 for females. The per capita income for the township was $13,025. There were 26.9% of families and 33.3% of the population living below the poverty line, including 52.4% of under eighteens and 42.9% of those over 64.
