= Crooked Lake Township, Cass County, Minnesota =

Crooked Lake Township, Minnesota
- Township
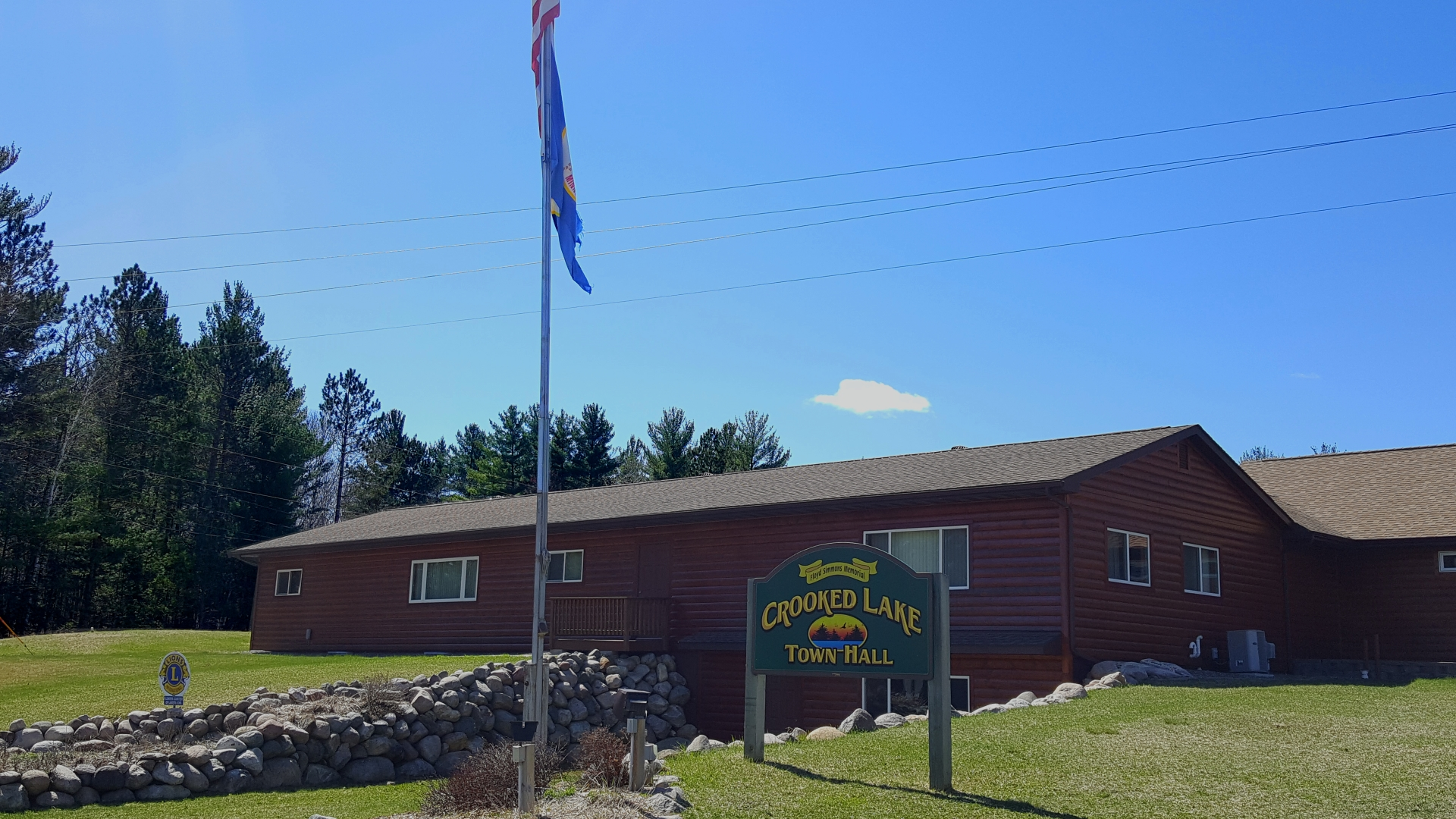
- Crooked Lake Township Hall, Cass County, MN

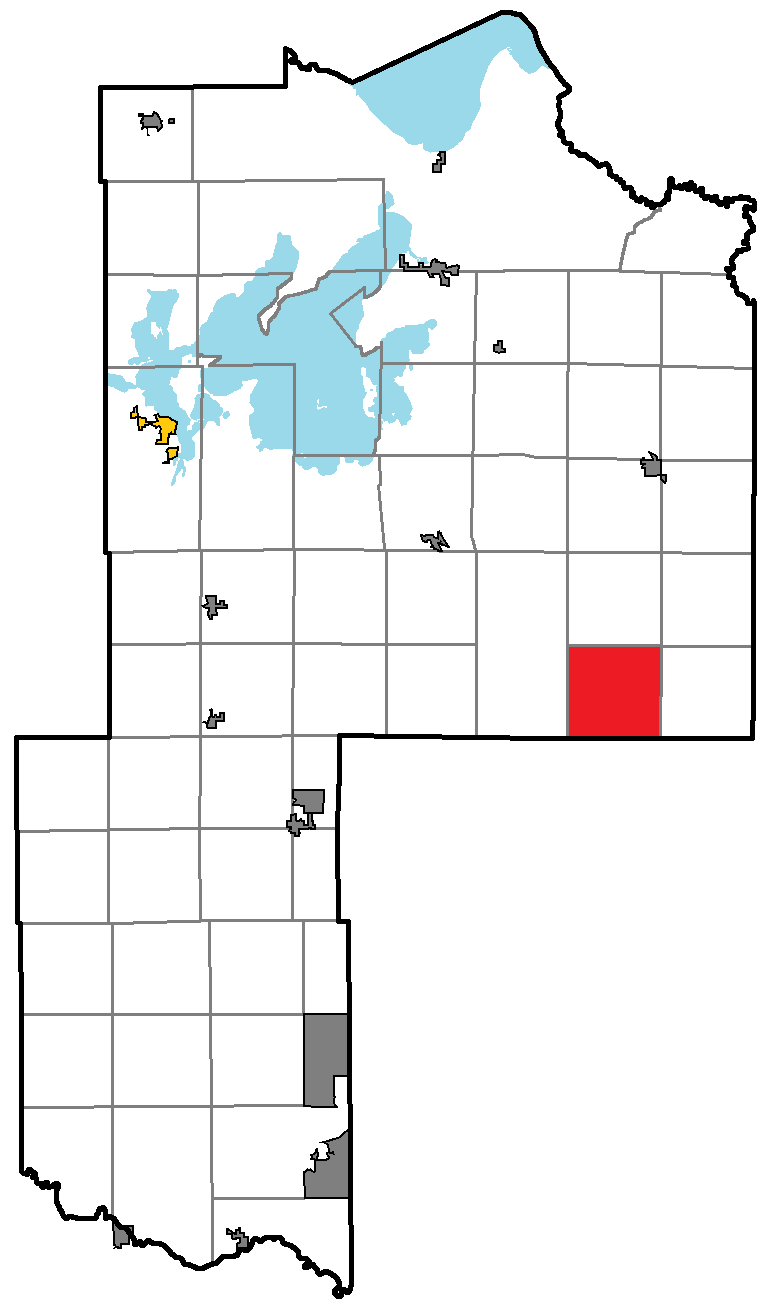
- Location of Crooked Lake Township, within Cass County, Minnesota
- Coordinates: 46°51′28″N 93°57′30″W
- Country: United States
- State: Minnesota
- County: Cass

Area
  - Total: 36.1 sq mi (93.5 km^{2})
  - Land: 30.0 sq mi (77.8 km^{2})
  - Water: 6.1 sq mi (15.7 km^{2})
- Elevation: 1,322 ft (403 m)

Population (2020)
  - Total: 504
  - Density: 16.8/sq mi (6.48/km^{2})
- Time zone: UTC-6 (Central (CST))
  - Summer (DST): UTC-5 (CDT)
- ZIP code: 56662
- Area code: 218
- FIPS code: 27-13834
- GNIS feature ID: 0663891
- Website: https://crookedlaketownship.com/

Crooked Lake Township is a township in Cass County, Minnesota, United States. The population was 504 as of the 2020 census. It is named after Roosevelt Lake, formerly known as Crooked Lake, a large lake located in this township. Crooked Lake is a translation from the Ojibwe Wewaagigamaag-zaaga'igan.

== Geography ==
According to the United States Census Bureau, the township has a total area of 36.1 square miles (93 km^{2}), of which 30.0 square miles (78 km^{2}) is land and 6.1 square miles (16 km^{2}) (16.76%) is water.

=== Unincorporated communities ===
- Outing

=== Major highway ===
- Minnesota State Highway 6

=== Lakes ===
- Abe Lake
- Andrus Lake
- Bear Lake
- Blue Bill Lake
- Donut Lake
- East Wood Lake
- Grasshopper Lake
- Lawrence Lake
- Lake George (east three-quarters)
- Lake Leavitt (west half)
- Margaret Lake
- Marion Lake
- Mule Lake
- Oxbox Lake (west three-quarters)
- Pavelgrit Lake
- Roosevelt Lake
- Smoky Hollow Lake
- Snake Lake
- Snowshoe Lake
- State Lake
- West Wood Lake
- Washburn Lake (vast majority)
- Wood Lake
- Woods Lake
- Wren Lake (west edge)

=== Adjacent townships ===
- Thunder Lake Township (north)
- Smoky Hollow Township (northeast)
- Beulah Township (east)
- Little Pine Township, Crow Wing County (southeast)
- Trelipe Township (west)

== Demographics ==
As of the census of 2000, there were 498 people, 249 households, and 164 families residing in the township. The population density was 16.6 inhabitants per square mile (6.4/km^{2}). There were 1,023 housing units at an average density of 34.1 per square mile (13.2/km^{2}). The racial makeup of the township was 98.39% White, 0.60% Native American, 0.20% Asian, and 0.80% from two or more races. Hispanic or Latino of any race were 0.40% of the population.

There were 249 households, out of which 12.4% had children under the age of 18 living with them, 63.9% were married couples living together, 0.8% had a female householder with no husband present, and 34.1% were non-families. 30.1% of all households were made up of individuals, and 15.7% had someone living alone who was 65 years of age or older. The average household size was 2.00 and the average family size was 2.45.

In the township the population was spread out, with 13.1% under the age of 18, 2.4% from 18 to 24, 14.1% from 25 to 44, 39.0% from 45 to 64, and 31.5% who were 65 years of age or older. The median age was 57 years. For every 100 females, there were 124.3 males. For every 100 females age 18 and over, there were 116.5 males.

The median income for a household in the township was $32,708, and the median income for a family was $40,625. Males had a median income of $35,833 versus $16,563 for females. The per capita income for the township was $21,294. About 2.1% of families and 6.3% of the population were below the poverty line, including none of those under age 18 and 6.1% of those age 65 or over.
