= Rogers Township, Minnesota =

- Township
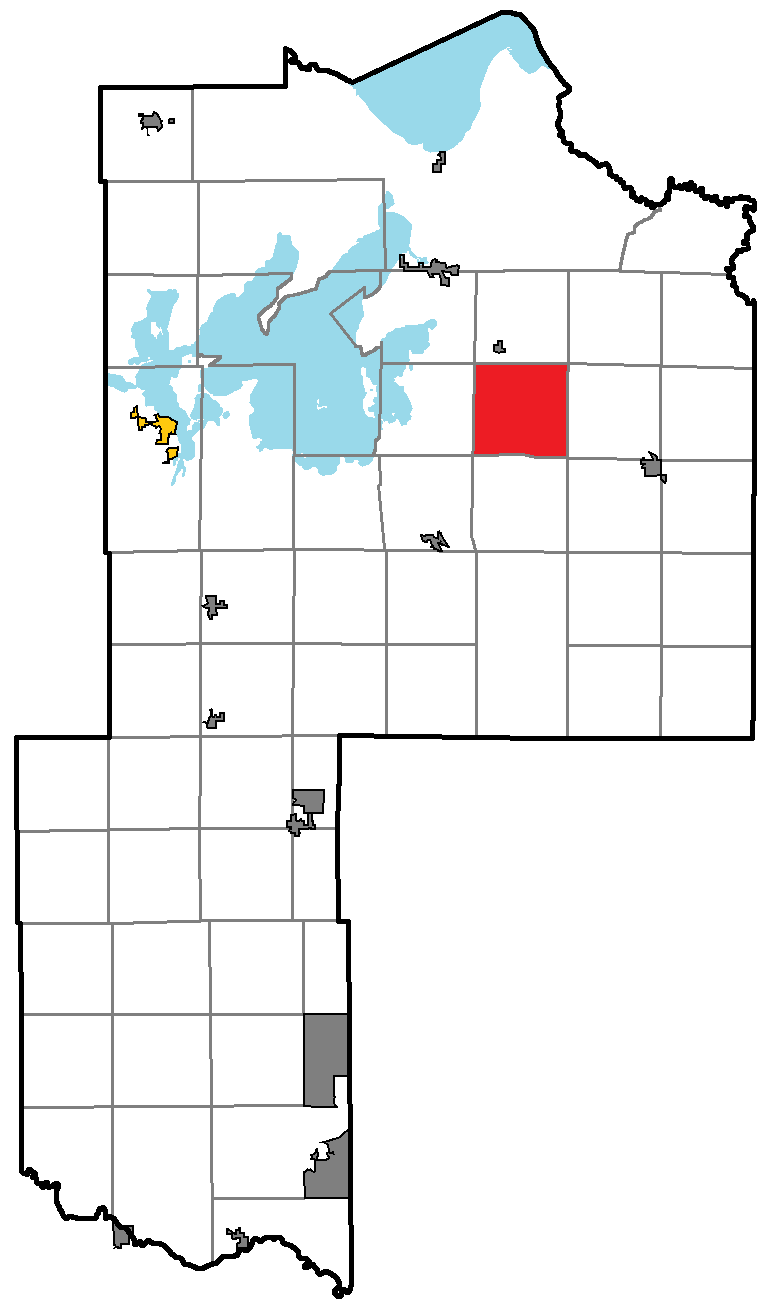
- Location of Rogers Township, within Cass County, Minnesota
- Coordinates: 47°5′51″N 94°5′39″W
- Country: United States
- State: Minnesota
- County: Cass

Area
  - Total: 36.3 sq mi (94.0 km^{2})
  - Land: 30.8 sq mi (79.9 km^{2})
  - Water: 5.4 sq mi (14.1 km^{2})
- Elevation: 1,300 ft (400 m)

Population (2020)
  - Total: 84
  - Density: 2.7/sq mi (1.1/km^{2})
- Time zone: UTC-6 (Central (CST))
  - Summer (DST): UTC-5 (CDT)
- FIPS code: 27-55168
- GNIS feature ID: 0665444

Rogers Township is a township in Cass County, Minnesota, United States. The population was 84 as of the 2020 census. Rogers Township was named for William A. Rogers, an early settler.

== Geography ==
According to the United States Census Bureau, the township has a total area of 36.3 square miles (94.0 km^{2}), of which 30.9 square miles (79.9 km^{2}) is land and 5.4 square miles (14.1 km^{2}) (15.01%) is water.

=== Unincorporated communities ===
- Tobique

=== Lakes ===
- Boy Lake (east three-quarters)
- Lomish Lake
- Lucille Lake
- Portage Lake
- Rabbit Lake
- Skelly Lake (southeast half)
- Swift Lake
- Tobique Lake

=== Adjacent townships ===
- Boy River Township (north)
- Salem Township (northeast)
- Slater Township (east)
- Remer Township (southeast)
- Inguadona Township (south)
- Kego Township (southwest)
- Boy Lake Township (west)
- Gould Township (northwest)

== Demographics ==
As of the census of 2000, there were 43 people, 25 households, and 16 families residing in the township. The population density was 1.4 people per square mile (0.5/km^{2}). There were 210 housing units at an average density of 6.8/sq mi (2.6/km^{2}). The racial makeup of the township was 95.35% White and 4.65% Native American.

There were 25 households, out of which 8.0% had children under the age of 18 living with them, 60.0% were married couples living together, and 36.0% were non-families. 36.0% of all households were made up of individuals, and 8.0% had someone living alone who was 65 years of age or older. The average household size was 1.72 and the average family size was 2.13.

In the township the population was spread out, with 4.7% under the age of 18, 14.0% from 25 to 44, 55.8% from 45 to 64, and 25.6% who were 65 years of age or older. The median age was 60 years. For every 100 females, there were 126.3 males. For every 100 females age 18 and over, there were 127.8 males.

The median income for a household in the township was $36,667, and the median income for a family was $36,250. Males had a median income of $41,250 versus $14,583 for females. The per capita income for the township was $28,367. There were 11.8% of families and 11.1% of the population living below the poverty line, including no under eighteens and 21.7% of those over 64.
