= Minnesota State Highway 84 =

State highway in Minnesota, United States

Trunk Highway 84
- MN 84 highlighted in red

Route information
- Maintained by MnDOT
- Length: 29.865 mi (48.063 km)
- Existed: 1933–present

Major junctions
- South end: MN 371 at Pine River
- MN 87 at Ponto Lake Township
- North end: MN 200 at Kego Township

Location
- Country: United States
- State: Minnesota
- Counties: Cass

Highway system
- Minnesota Trunk Highway System; Interstate; US; State; Legislative; Scenic
← MN 83	→ MN 86

Minnesota State Highway 84 (MN 84) is a 29.865-mile-long (48.063 km) highway in north-central Minnesota, which runs from its intersection with Highway 371 in Pine River and continues north to its northern terminus at its intersection with State Highway 200 in Kego Township, four miles north of Longville.

The route is two lanes throughout except for a small portion in Pine River near its southern terminus at Highway 371. The route is a winding road with several sharp turns of 25 mph (40 km/h) or less.

== Route description ==
State Highway 84 serves as a north–south route between the communities of Pine River and Longville in north-central Minnesota.

The highway passes through the Chippewa National Forest between Longville and State Highway 200.

Highway 84 has a junction with the eastern terminus of State Highway 87 about midway between Pine River and Longville.

The route is legally defined as Legislative Route 139 in the Minnesota Statutes. It is not marked with this number.

== History ==
State Highway 84 was authorized in 1933.

A majority of the route was paved by 1940. It was completely paved by 1949.

== Major intersections ==
The entire route is in Cass County.

Location	mi	km	Destinations	Notes
Pine River	0.000	0.000	MN 371 / CSAH 14 – Brainerd, Walker	Southern terminus
Pine River	0.370	0.595	CSAH 1 (5th Street) / Paul Bunyan Scenic Byway – Emily	
Ponto Lake Township	11.292	18.173	MN 87 west – Backus	Eastern terminus of MN 87
Kego Township	30.036	48.338	MN 200 / CSAH 8 north – Remer, Walker	Northern terminus
1.000 mi = 1.609 km; 1.000 km = 0.621 mi
