= Barclay Township, Cass County, Minnesota =

Barclay Township, Minnesota
- Township
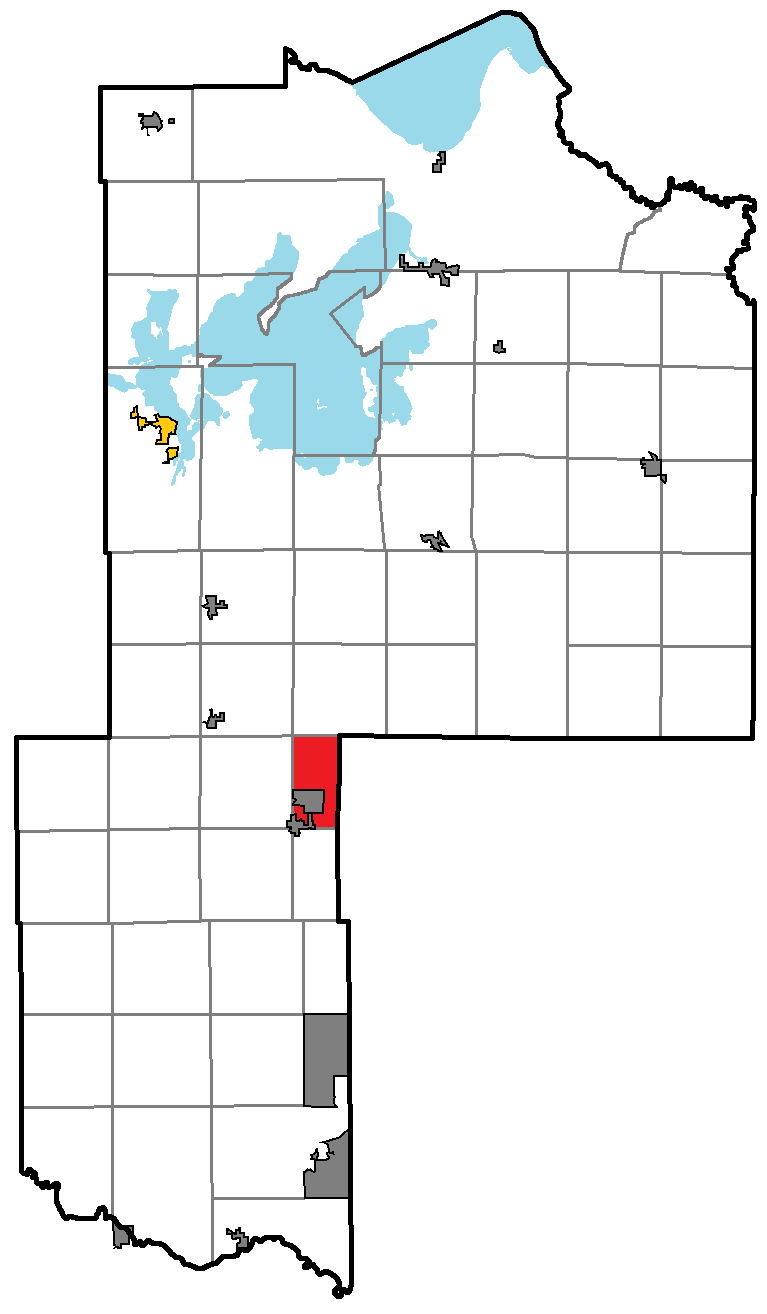
- Location of Barclay Township, within Cass County, Minnesota
- Coordinates: 46°45′31″N 94°22′41″W
- Country: United States
- State: Minnesota
- County: Cass

Area
  - Total: 15.0 sq mi (38.9 km^{2})
  - Land: 14.0 sq mi (36.2 km^{2})
  - Water: 1.0 sq mi (2.7 km^{2})
- Elevation: 1,319 ft (402 m)

Population (2020)
  - Total: 525
  - Density: 37.6/sq mi (14.5/km^{2})
- Time zone: UTC-6 (Central (CST))
  - Summer (DST): UTC-5 (CDT)
- ZIP code: 56474
- Area code: 218
- FIPS code: 27-03538
- GNIS feature ID: 0663505

Barclay Township is a township in Cass County, Minnesota, United States. As of the 2020 census, its population was 525. Barclay Township was named for an early settler.

== Geography ==
According to the United States Census Bureau, Barclay Township covers an area of 15.03 square miles (38.92 square kilometers); of this, 1.06 square miles (2.75 square kilometers) or 7.07 percent is water.

The entire city of Chickamaw Beach and the north quarter of the city of Pine River are located within Barclay Township geographically but are separate entities.

=== Adjacent townships ===
- Ponto Lake Township (north)
- Gail Lake Township, Crow Wing County (east)
- Jenkins Township, Crow Wing County (southeast)
- Wilson Township (south)
- Pine River Township (west and southwest)
- Powers Township (northwest)

=== Major highway ===
- Minnesota State Highway 84

=== Lakes ===
- Ding Pot Lake
- Horseshoe Lake
- Little Sand Lake
- Lizotte Lake
- Lake Hattie (south edge)
- Norway Lake (northeast half)
- Swede Lake

== School districts ==
- Pine River–Backus

== Political districts ==
- Minnesota's 8th congressional district
- State House District 04b
- State Senate District 04

== Demographics ==
As of the census of 2000, there were 516 people, 212 households, and 146 families residing in the township. The population density was 36.9 inhabitants per square mile (14.2/km^{2}). There were 285 housing units at an average density of 20.4 per square mile (7.9/km^{2}). The racial makeup of the township was 96.71% White, 0.19% African American, 0.97% Native American, 0.58% Asian, and 1.55% from two or more races. Hispanic or Latino of any race were 1.94% of the population.

There were 212 households, out of which 32.1% had children under the age of 18 living with them, 58.0% were married couples living together, 4.2% had a female householder with no husband present, and 31.1% were non-families. 28.8% of all households were made up of individuals, and 14.2% had someone living alone who was 65 years of age or older. The average household size was 2.43 and the average family size was 3.00.

In the township the population was spread out, with 25.4% under the age of 18, 6.2% from 18 to 24, 25.4% from 25 to 44, 27.3% from 45 to 64, and 15.7% who were 65 years of age or older. The median age was 42 years. For every 100 females, there were 102.4 males. For every 100 females age 18 and over, there were 109.2 males.

The median income for a household in the township was $32,039, and the median income for a family was $36,058. Males had a median income of $30,972 versus $17,500 for females. The per capita income for the township was $15,215. About 2.9% of families and 8.0% of the population were below the poverty line, including 11.3% of those under age 18 and 7.4% of those age 65 or over.
