= Pine River-Backus School District =

School district in Minnesota, United States

Coordinates: 46°43′35.7″N 94°24′22.9″W

- 401 Murray Ave Pine River, MN

District information
- Type: Public
- Grades: PreK-12
- Superintendent: Jon Clark
- Schools: Pine River-Backus High School Pine River-Backus Elementary Pine River-Backus ALC
- District ID: 2174

Students and staff
- Students: 945
- Staff: 85
- District mascot: Tigers

Pine River-Backus School District is a school district in north central Minnesota along Minnesota State Highway 371. Pine River-Backus Schools serves students and families from the communities of Pine River, Backus, Chickamaw Beach, Jenkins, Emily, Fifty Lakes, Longville, Leader & Manhattan Beach. The district (ISD 2174) was formed after the merger of the Pine River (ISD 117) and Backus (ISD 114) school districts in 1992. Originally, there were schools in both Pine River and Backus, but now all schools operate on a single conjoined campus in Pine River.

Schools include:

- Pine River-Backus High School
- Pine River-Backus Elementary School
- Pine River Alternative Learning Center

Pine River-Backus Schools, often known by "PRB", serves a mostly rural and small town population with a total of 945 students. The school district colors are orange and black. The mascot for all schools is the Tiger.

== Academic program ==
PRB Schools offers free comprehensive preschool and early education program to families with three and four year-olds with flexible scheduling and transportation. Pine River Backus-Elementary has students in grades K-6 including offering all-day kindergarten. Pine River-Backus High School has students in grades 7-12. PRB High School offers College in the Schools (CIS) courses via Central Lakes College in Brainerd, MN allowing students the opportunity to earn an Associate's degree at the same time as their high school diploma. PRB High School also offers world language (French), arts (Band & Choir), and STEM (PLTW) courses.

== Governance ==
Pine River-Backus Schools is led by Superintendent Jon Clark and governed by a publicly elected board of seven directors. Current board directors are:

- Chris Cunningham (Chair)
- Roger Hoplin
- Leslie Bouchonville
- Nicki Linsten-Lodge
- Carrie Maurer-Ackerman
- Dave Sheley
- Ryan Trumble
