= Wilson Township, Cass County, Minnesota =

Wilson Township, Minnesota
- Township
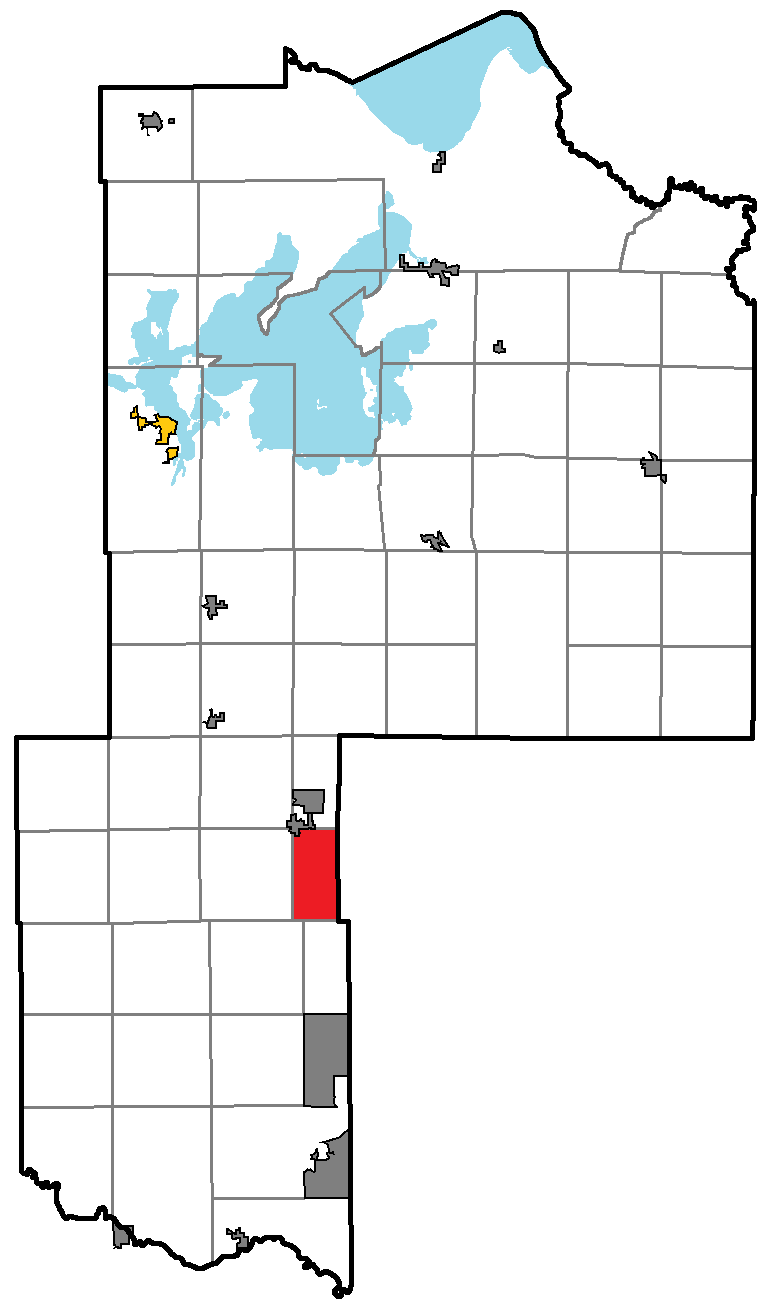
- Location of Wilson Township, within Cass County, Minnesota
- Coordinates: 46°41′25″N 94°22′41″W
- Country: United States
- State: Minnesota
- County: Cass

Area
  - Total: 17.9 sq mi (46.3 km^{2})
  - Land: 17.7 sq mi (45.9 km^{2})
  - Water: 0.12 sq mi (0.3 km^{2})
- Elevation: 1,296 ft (395 m)

Population (2020)
  - Total: 667
  - Density: 37.6/sq mi (14.5/km^{2})
- Time zone: UTC-6 (Central (CST))
  - Summer (DST): UTC-5 (CDT)
- ZIP code: 56474
- Area code: 218
- FIPS code: 27-70654
- GNIS feature ID: 0666008

Wilson Township is a township in Cass County, Minnesota, United States. The population was 667 as of the 2020 census.

== Geography ==
According to the United States Census Bureau, the township has a total area of 17.9 square miles (46.3 km^{2}), of which 17.7 square miles (45.9 km^{2}) is land and 0.1 square miles (0.3 km^{2}) (0.67%) is water.

The south quarter of the city of Pine River is located within Wilson Township geographically but is a separate entity.

=== Major highway ===
- Minnesota State Highway 371

=== Lakes ===
- Jokela Lake
- Rice Lake

=== Adjacent townships ===
- Barclay Township (north)
- Gail Lake Township, Crow Wing County (northeast)
- Jenkins Township, Crow Wing County (east)
- Loon Lake Township (south)
- Maple Township (southwest)
- Walden Township (west)

=== Cemeteries ===
The township contains Pine Ridge Cemetery.

== Demographics ==
As of the census of 2000, there were 551 people, 208 households, and 138 families residing in the township. The population density was 31.1 inhabitants per square mile (12.0/km^{2}). There were 228 housing units at an average density of 12.9/sq mi (5.0/km^{2}). The racial makeup of the township was 97.82% White, 0.91% Native American, 0.18% Asian, 0.18% Pacific Islander, and 0.91% from two or more races. Hispanic or Latino of any race were 0.73% of the population.

There were 208 households, out of which 35.6% had children under the age of 18 living with them, 55.8% were married couples living together, 7.7% had a female householder with no husband present, and 33.2% were non-families. 26.4% of all households were made up of individuals, and 13.0% had someone living alone who was 65 years of age or older. The average household size was 2.65 and the average family size was 3.22.

In the township the population was spread out, with 30.7% under the age of 18, 7.1% from 18 to 24, 28.1% from 25 to 44, 20.9% from 45 to 64, and 13.2% who were 65 years of age or older. The median age was 35 years. For every 100 females, there were 103.3 males. For every 100 females age 18 and over, there were 111.0 males.

The median income for a household in the township was $30,833, and the median income for a family was $38,929. Males had a median income of $21,979 versus $16,806 for females. The per capita income for the township was $12,945. About 16.9% of families and 18.9% of the population were below the poverty line, including 24.2% of those under age 18 and 17.5% of those age 65 or over.
