= Fort Flatmouth Mounds =

- U.S. National Register of Historic Places
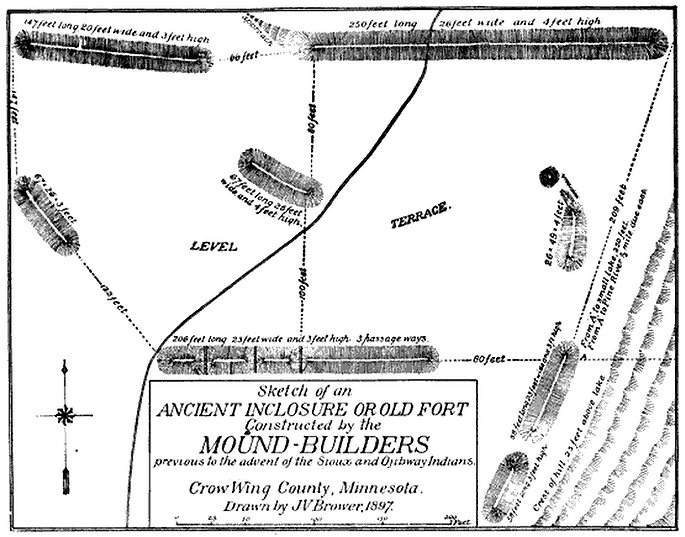
- 1897 survey map of the Fort Flatmouth Mounds
- Location: Address restricted, Mission Township, Minnesota
- Area: 9 acres (3.6 ha)
- Built: Undetermined
- NRHP reference No.: 73000975
- Designated: August 14, 1973

The Fort Flatmouth Mounds form a prehistoric Native American archaeological site in Mission Township, Minnesota, United States. It consists of nine mounds grouped in a rough ellipse and a few additional mounds in close proximity. Early Euro-American settlers assumed the enclosure was built as a fort, hence the name, but it was more likely religious in nature. The site was listed on the National Register of Historic Places in 1973 for having state-level significance in the theme of archaeology. It was nominated for its information potential as a unique site in a region whose numerous mound and village sites indicate a long span of indigenous occupation.

== Description ==
The Fort Flatmouth Mounds consist of eight linear mounds and one circular mound arrayed in a rough ellipse. They occupy a flat terrace a short distance from the Pine River. At the time of their first thorough survey in 1896, the mounds all stood 3 to 4 feet (91 to 122 cm) high. The longest embankment measures 250 feet (76 m) long and 26 feet (7.9 m) wide, running east to west along the upper edge of the enclosure. After a 66-foot (20 m) gap a 147-foot-long (45 m) embankment extends to the west, though skewing slightly north. South of that and running southeast is a 67-foot (20 m) embankment. The south side of the enclosure is defined by four closely spaced mounds laid end to end for a distance of 206 feet (63 m). The east side is open but for a 49-by-26-foot (14.9 by 7.9 m) linear mound and a small conical mound. There is a 67-foot-long (20 m) mound in the middle of the group, and two more linear mounds along the crest of a bluff to the southeast.

The layout of the Fort Flatmouth site contrasts with two other mound groups in the area: the Gordon–Schaust Site, whose mounds lie end to end, and the Upper Hay Lake Mounds, which lie in parallel rows.

== Archaeological history ==
The Fort Flatmouth Mounds were named in honor of Esh-ke-bug-e-coshe ("Bill like a new leaf", known to English speakers as Flatmouth), the leader of the Pillager Band of Ojibwe in the area in the mid-19th century. He shared the location of this mound group and many others with William Whipple Warren, a biracial historian who collected Ojibwe oral tradition for a book. An early logging road was blazed through the mound group, which early Euro-American settlers took to be a defensive fortification. Warren followed suit and referred to the site as a fort, as did settler George B. Wright, who recorded a description of it in 1867. The mounds were mapped by Jacob V. Brower in 1896 as part of his extensive survey of archaeological sites in Minnesota.

The mounds were resurveyed in 1972 by the Minnesota Historical Society, which found that they were still in mostly excellent condition. Modern researchers have largely disregarded the theory that the mounds were created for defense.

== See also ==
- National Register of Historic Places listings in Crow Wing County, Minnesota
