= Gordon–Schaust Site =

- Gordon-Schaust Site
- U.S. National Register of Historic Places
- U.S. Historic district
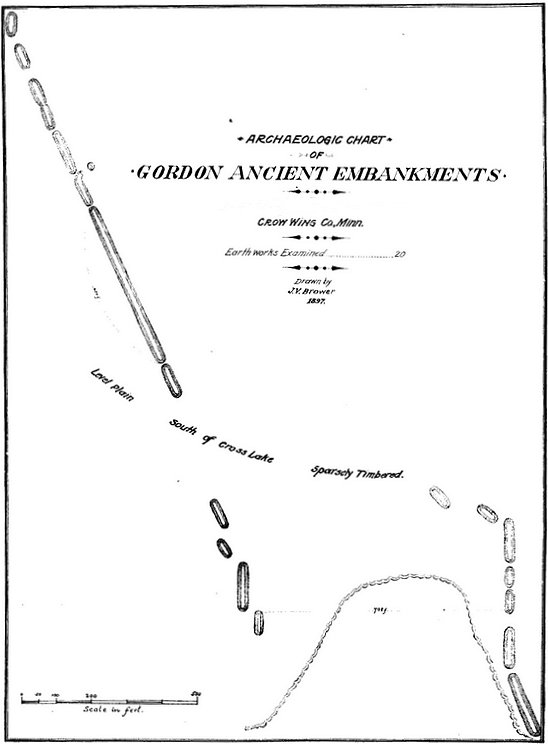
- 1901 survey map of the Gordon Embankments
- Location: Address restricted, Crosslake, Minnesota
- Built: Undetermined
- NRHP reference No.: 74001015
- Designated HD: December 23, 1974

The Gordon–Schaust Site (Smithsonian trinomial 21CW83) is a prehistoric Native American archaeological site in Crosslake, Minnesota, United States. It comprises two separate but nearly parallel groups of linear mounds, undated but well preserved. The site was listed on the National Register of Historic Places in 1974 for having state-level significance in the theme of archaeology.

== Archaeological history ==
The main series of mounds was first documented by Jacob V. Brower during archaeological surveys in 1897 and 1901. He dubbed them the Gordon Embankments. The Minnesota Historical Society sponsored a new survey in 1972, which revealed a second series of mounds a short distance away and nearly parallel to the first. These were designated the Schaust Embankments.

== Description ==
The Gordon Embankments consist of 20 mounds, all but one of them linear. Four lie on a north–south axis, while the rest trend somewhat to the northwest. The longest is 480 feet (150 m) long. Brower described the mounds as being 20 feet (6 m) wide and 2.5 feet (0.76 m) high, and measured the full span of the mound group at 1,040 feet (320 m).

Both embankments comprise a series of linear mounds lying mostly end to end. This contrasts with two other mound groups in the area: the Upper Hay Lake Mounds lie in parallel rows, while the Fort Flatmouth Mounds form a rough enclosure.

== See also ==
- National Register of Historic Places listings in Crow Wing County, Minnesota
