= Wilkinson Township, Cass County, Minnesota =

Wilkinson Township, Minnesota
- Township
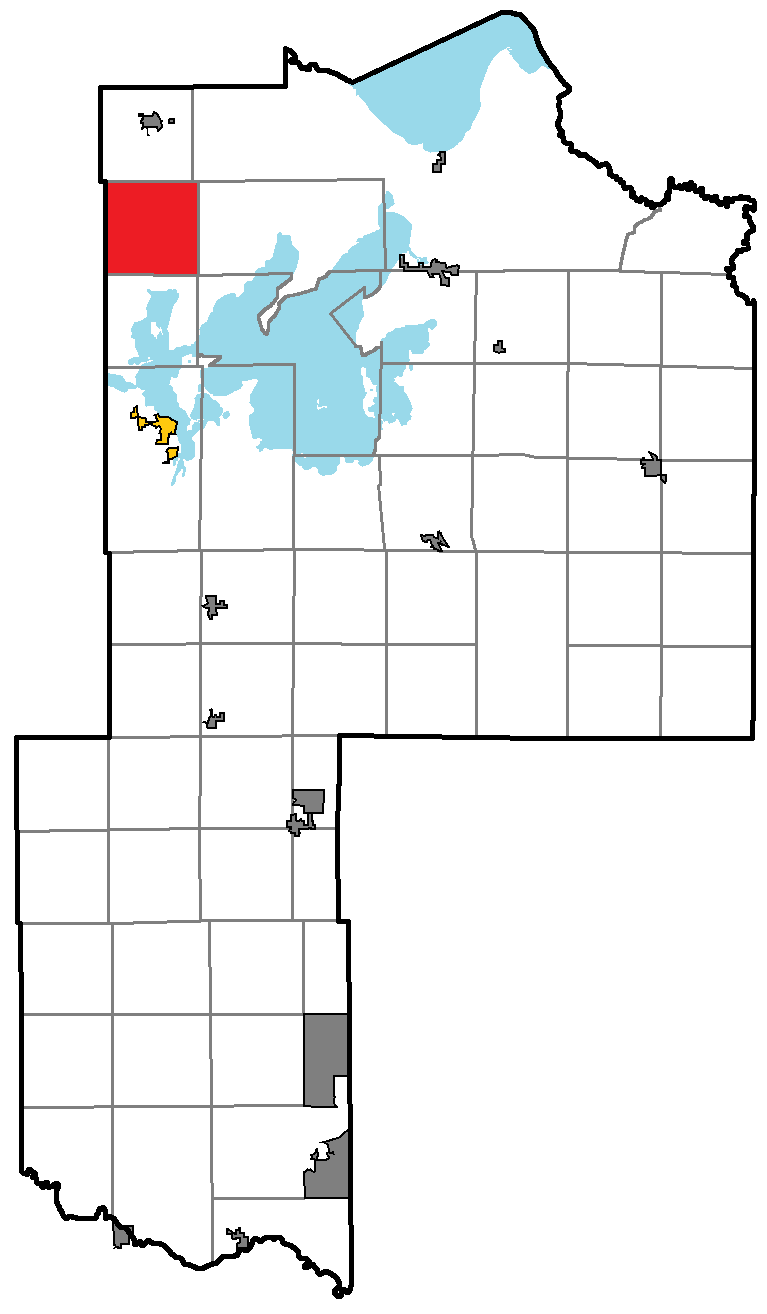
- Location of Wilkinson Township, within Cass County, Minnesota
- Coordinates: 47°17′5″N 94°37′14″W
- Country: United States
- State: Minnesota
- County: Cass

Area
  - Total: 36.0 sq mi (93.3 km^{2})
  - Land: 30.7 sq mi (79.6 km^{2})
  - Water: 5.3 sq mi (13.8 km^{2})
- Elevation: 1,293 ft (394 m)

Population (2020)
  - Total: 574
  - Density: 18.7/sq mi (7.21/km^{2})
- Time zone: UTC-6 (Central (CST))
  - Summer (DST): UTC-5 (CDT)
- ZIP code: 56633
- Area code: 218
- FIPS code: 27-70348
- GNIS feature ID: 0665995

Wilkinson Township is a township in Cass County, Minnesota, United States. The population was 574 as of the 2020 census.

Wilkinson Township is named after Major Melville Wilkinson of the 3rd Regiment United States Infantry, who was killed during the Battle of Sugar Point.

== Geography ==
According to the United States Census Bureau, the township has a total area of 36.0 square miles (93.3 km^{2}), of which 30.7 square miles (79.5 km^{2}) is land and 5.3 square miles (13.8 km^{2}) (14.76%) is water.

Much of the township is forested. Portions of the township are within the boundaries of the Chippewa National Forest, Bowstring State Forest, and Welsh Lake State Forest.

=== Unincorporated communities ===
- Raboin
- Steamboat Landing
- Wilkinson

=== Major highway ===
- Minnesota State Highway 371

=== Lakes ===
- Crooked Lake (vast majority)
- Faherty Lake
- Hessie Lake
- Little Moss Lake
- Little Twin Lake
- Lake Thirteen
- Moss Lake
- Portage Lake
- Steamboat Bay Lake
- Steamboat Lake
- Twin Lake
- Welsh Lake

=== Adjacent townships ===
- Pike Bay Township (north)
- Otter Tail Peninsula Township (east)
- Leech Lake Township (south)
- Lakeport Township, Hubbard County (southwest)
- Hart Lake Township, Hubbard County (west)

== History ==
A branch line of the Great Northern Railway was built through the township in 1898; the railroad was abandoned in 1972 and converted to the Heartland State Trail. The Great Northern swing bridge crossing the Steamboat River, built in 1915, is listed on the National Register of Historic Places. A post office named Marcus was established in 1904 in section 32; the name was changed to Wilkinson in 1910 and closed in 1954. A second post office named Raboin in section 17 served the northern portion of the township between 1911 and 1936.

== Demographics ==
As of the census of 2000, there were 270 people, 106 households, and 76 families residing in the township. The population density was 8.8 people per square mile (3.4/km^{2}). There were 179 housing units at an average density of 5.8/sq mi (2.3/km^{2}). The racial makeup of the township was 66.30% White, 30.37% Native American, 0.74% Asian, 0.74% from other races, and 1.85% from two or more races.

There were 106 households, out of which 25.5% had children under the age of 18 living with them, 52.8% were married couples living together, 12.3% had a female householder with no husband present, and 27.4% were non-families. 20.8% of all households were made up of individuals, and 10.4% had someone living alone who was 65 years of age or older. The average household size was 2.55 and the average family size was 2.96.

In the township the population was spread out, with 22.2% under the age of 18, 6.7% from 18 to 24, 24.4% from 25 to 44, 30.4% from 45 to 64, and 16.3% who were 65 years of age or older. The median age was 43 years. For every 100 females, there were 114.3 males. For every 100 females age 18 and over, there were 101.9 males.

The median income for a household in the township was $30,750, and the median income for a family was $40,000. Males had a median income of $23,500 versus $18,125 for females. The per capita income for the township was $15,628. About 12.2% of families and 10.5% of the population were below the poverty line, including 19.3% of those under the age of eighteen and none of those 65 or over.
