= Leech Lake, Minnesota =

Unincorporated community in Minnesota, US

Leech Lake
- Unincorporated community
- Location within Minnesota Location within the United States
- Coordinates: 47°09′53″N 94°38′16″W
- Country: United States
- State: Minnesota
- County: Cass
- Township: Leech Lake Township
- Elevation: 1,342 ft (409 m)
- Time zone: UTC-6 (Central (CST))
  - Summer (DST): UTC-5 (CDT)
- ZIP code: 56484 and 56461
- Area code: 218
- GNIS feature ID: 656979

Leech Lake is an unincorporated community in Leech Lake Township, Cass County, Minnesota, United States. It is along State Highway 371 (MN 371) near 100th Street NW, Cass County Road 62. Nearby places include Walker, Laporte, and Steamboat Bay of Leech Lake.
