= Otter Tail Peninsula Township, Cass County, Minnesota =

Otter Tail Peninsula Township, Minnesota
- Township
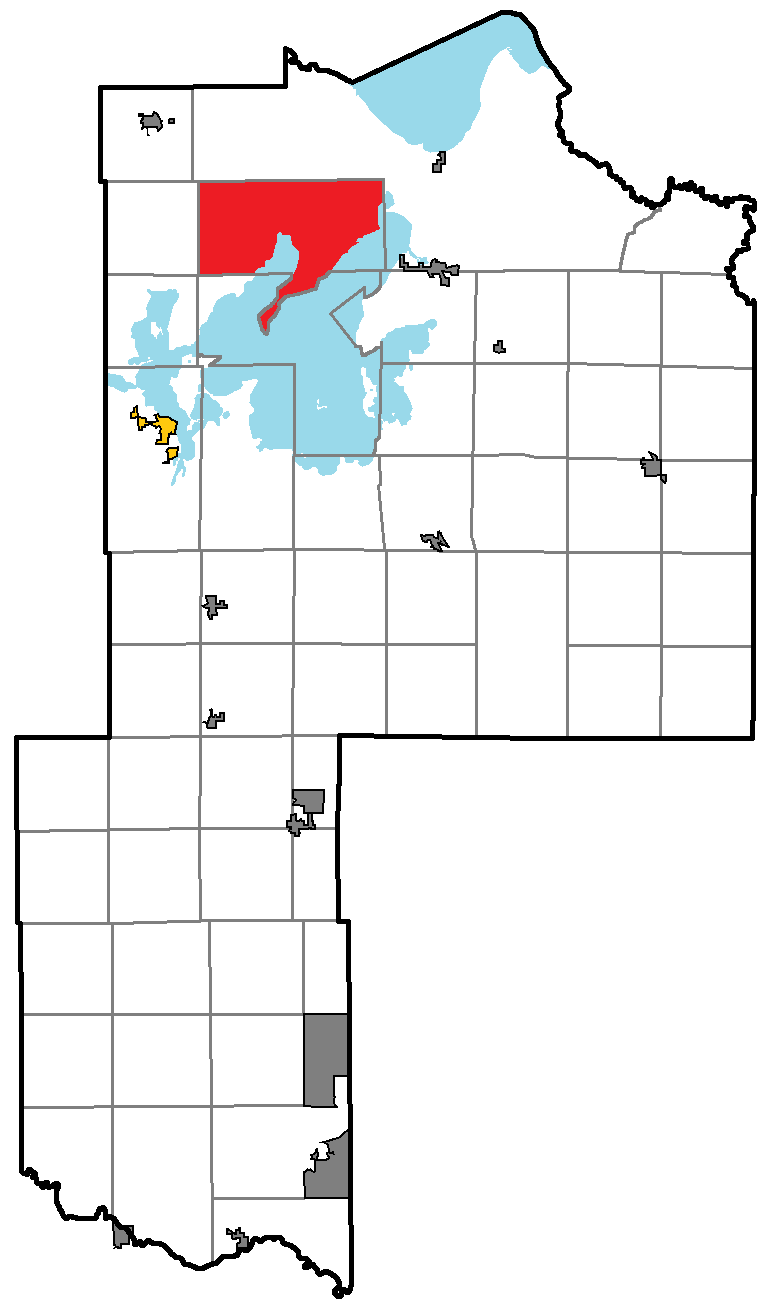
- Location of Otter Tail Peninsula Township, within Cass County, Minnesota
- Coordinates: 47°17′9″N 94°24′22″W
- Country: United States
- State: Minnesota
- County: Cass

Area
  - Total: 75.1 sq mi (194.5 km^{2})
  - Land: 64.3 sq mi (166.5 km^{2})
  - Water: 10.8 sq mi (28.0 km^{2})
- Elevation: 1,342 ft (409 m)

Population (2020)
  - Total: 82
  - Density: 1.3/sq mi (0.49/km^{2})
- Time zone: UTC-6 (Central (CST))
  - Summer (DST): UTC-5 (CDT)
- FIPS code: 27-49250
- GNIS feature ID: 0665241
- Website: http://www.ottertailpeninsulatownship.org/

Otter Tail Peninsula Township is a township in Cass County, Minnesota, United States. The population was 82 as of the 2020 census.

== History ==
Otter Tail Peninsula Township was established in 1987.

== Geography ==
According to the United States Census Bureau, the township has a total area of 75.1 square miles (194.5 km^{2}), of which 64.3 square miles (166.5 km^{2}) is land and 10.8 square miles (28.0 km^{2}) (14.38%) is water.

=== Lakes ===
- Leech Lake (north edge)
- Life Raft Lake
- Lower Sucker Lake (south edge)

=== Adjacent townships ===
- Gould Township (southeast)
- Leech Lake Township (southwest)
- Wilkinson Township (west)

=== Cemeteries ===
The township contains Rabbits Cemetery.

== Demographics ==
As of the census of 2000, there were 43 people, 22 households, and 15 families residing in the township. The population density was 0.7 people per square mile (0.3/km^{2}). There were 91 housing units at an average density of 1.4/sq mi (0.5/km^{2}). The racial makeup of the township was 86.05% White, 2.33% Native American, and 11.63% from two or more races.

There were 22 households, out of which 4.5% had children under the age of 18 living with them, 63.6% were married couples living together, 4.5% had a female householder with no husband present, and 27.3% were non-families. 27.3% of all households were made up of individuals, and 9.1% had someone living alone who was 65 years of age or older. The average household size was 1.95 and the average family size was 2.31.

In the township the population was spread out, with 9.3% under the age of 18, 2.3% from 18 to 24, 9.3% from 25 to 44, 48.8% from 45 to 64, and 30.2% who were 65 years of age or older. The median age was 58 years. For every 100 females, there were 95.5 males. For every 100 females age 18 and over, there were 95.0 males.

The median income for a household in the township was $31,875, and the median income for a family was $90,000. Males had a median income of $29,375 versus $25,625 for females. The per capita income for the township was $30,869. None of the population and none of the families were below the poverty line.
