= National Register of Historic Places listings in Cass County, Minnesota =

Location of Cass County in Minnesota

This is a list of the National Register of Historic Places listings in Cass County, Minnesota. It is intended to be a complete list of the properties and districts on the National Register of Historic Places in Cass County, Minnesota, United States. The locations of National Register properties and districts for which the latitude and longitude coordinates are included below, may be seen in an online map.

There are 20 properties and districts listed on the National Register in the county. A supplementary list includes 3 additional sites that were formerly listed on the National Register.

This National Park Service list is complete through NPS recent listings posted July 10, 2026.

== Current listings ==
	Name on the Register	Image	Date listed	Location	City or town	Description
1	Battle Point (21CA12)	Battle Point (21CA12)	August 17, 1990 (#90001144)	6 mi (9.7 km) west of County Highway 8 on Leech Lake in Battleground State Forest; 47°09′52″N 94°18′33″W	Leech Lake Indian Reservation	Site of the 1898 Battle of Sugar Point, the last engagement between Native Americans and the U.S. military, which prompted changes in federal timber management. Also contains burials and archaeological resources from precontact Dakota and postcontact Ojibwe occupations.
2	Brainerd and Northern Minnesota–Minnesota and International Railway Depot	Brainerd and Northern Minnesota–Minnesota and International Railway Depot	August 1, 2012 (#12000459)	102 Barclay Ave. W. 46°43′02″N 94°24′14″W	Pine River	1895 railway station that led to the establishment of Pine River on a major new logging route laid by the Brainerd and Northern Minnesota Railway.
3	Chase Hotel	Chase Hotel	June 4, 1980 (#80001994)	329 Cleveland Ave. 47°06′12″N 94°35′00″W	Walker	1922 example of the first-class resort hotels built in Cass County at the dawn of the automobile era.
4	Chippewa Agency Historic District	Chippewa Agency Historic District	May 22, 1973 (#73000967)	Address restricted	Pillager vicinity	Location of a key indian agency active 1851–1869, hub of the region's mid-19th-century activity. District also includes the sites of a prehistoric mound and village, an early road, the first logging camp on the Crow Wing River, and Hole in the Day's assassination in 1868.
5	Conservation Building	Conservation Building	January 15, 2003 (#02001706)	205 Minnesota Ave. 47°06′05″N 94°34′42″W	Walker	Unique example—built 1934–36—of the municipal facilities funded by New Deal federal relief programs, featuring a visitor center, wildlife museum, rock garden, and offices used by numerous New Deal services.
6	Crow Wing State Park	Crow Wing State Park	July 28, 1970 (#70000288)	Off Minnesota Highway 371; 46°16′39″N 94°20′40″W	Pillager vicinity	Long-used site at a key travel junction associated with the Dakota/Ojibwe territorial conflict and the early town of Old Crow Wing, whose abandonment in the 1880s uniquely preserves the succession of the Native American, fur trade, and logging eras. Extends into Crow Wing and Morrison Counties.
7	Great Northern Railway Company Bridge	Great Northern Railway Company Bridge	October 14, 1980 (#80001990)	Southwest of Cass Lake off Minnesota Highway 371; 47°16′07″N 94°37′40″W	Cass Lake vicinity	Railroad bridge built circa 1915 with a swing section to accommodate lumber shipping on the Steamboat River, representing the interplay of the logging and railroad industries in northern Minnesota. Now carries the Heartland State Trail.
8	Gull Lake Mounds Site	Gull Lake Mounds Site	May 7, 1973 (#73000968)	Gull Lake Recreation Area; 46°24′43″N 94°21′05″W	East Gull Lake	Rare surviving mound group in a rapidly developing resort region, with 12 complete burial mounds dating from 800 BCE–200 CE and 500–900 CE.
9	Hackensack Conservation Building		October 26, 2023 (#100009470)	101 Fleischer Ave. 46°55′51″N 94°31′24″W	Hackensack	1936 public building hosting a wide variety of community services since it was built by the Works Progress Administration, exhibiting finely crafted rustic architecture and the lasting impact of the New Deal.
10	Hole-in-the-Day House Site	Hole-in-the-Day House Site	June 19, 1973 (#73000969)	Address restricted	Pillager vicinity	Site of an early-1850s farmhouse built for prominent Ojibwe leader Hole in the Day (c. 1825–1868), who espoused strategic enculturation as a way to advance tribal interests.
11	Old Backus	Old Backus	December 24, 1974 (#74001009)	Address restricted	Backus vicinity	Long-used habitation site containing evidence of Late Woodland period seasonal villages, historical Ojibwe burials, a logging camp established in 1885, and the original townsite of Backus (abandoned in 1902).
12	Pine River to Woman Lake and Longville Stagecoach Road-Widow Lake Segment Historic District	Pine River to Woman Lake and Longville Stagecoach Road-Widow Lake Segment Historic District	November 12, 2014 (#14000908)	Address restricted	Hackensack vicinity	.3-mile (0.48 km) stagecoach road section and waystation site in use 1891–1930, associated with the staging industry, early logging, Euro-American settlement, and early tourism development in north-central Minnesota.
13	Rice Lake Hut Rings	Rice Lake Hut Rings	August 14, 1973 (#73000970)	Address restricted	Pillager vicinity	Four large depressions thought to be remnants of Native American earth lodges from the Contact era or just prior.
14	Sherwood Forest Lodge Complex	Sherwood Forest Lodge Complex	June 16, 1980 (#80001992)	County Highway 77; 46°29′08″N 94°21′39″W	Lake Shore	Highly intact example of north-central Minnesota's early lake resorts, with a main lodge and 20 cabins built around 1929. Also noted for its finely crafted rustic architecture.
15	Soo Line Depot	Soo Line Depot	May 23, 1980 (#80001993)	Off Main St. 47°03′25″N 93°55′06″W	Remer	Circa-1910 railway station noted as a well-preserved example of the Soo Line's standard second-class depots and for its associations with the establishment and development of Remer.
16	South Pike Bay Site	South Pike Bay Site	January 22, 2014 (#13001111)	South Pike Bay Campground, Chippewa National Forest; 47°19′47″N 94°35′09″W	Cass Lake vicinity	Beach terraces on Cass Lake yielding extensive archaeological resources from repeated encampment during the Late Paleoindian/Early Archaic transition and again throughout the Woodland period.
17	Supervisor's Office Headquarters	Supervisor's Office Headquarters	January 31, 1976 (#76001049)	200 Ash Ave. NW; 47°22′45″N 94°36′51″W	Cass Lake	1935 headquarters of Chippewa National Forest, significant for its chinkless log construction in traditional Scandinavian style and its association with the federal work relief projects of the New Deal.
18	United States Forest Service, Remer District Ranger Station		May 11, 1982 (#100009469)	307 Main St. E. 47°03′20″N 93°54′44″W	Remer	District headquarters active 1936–1972, with three contributing properties built by the Civilian Conservation Corps, recalling the expansion of Chippewa National Forest during the New Deal and its lasting economic benefits.
19	Winnibigoshish Lake Dam	Winnibigoshish Lake Dam	May 11, 1982 (#82004629)	County Highway 9 at the Mississippi River; 47°25′47″N 94°03′04″W	Bena vicinity	Dam built 1899–1900, associated with the first and largest of the reservoirs created in the region as a federal project to control the flow of the Upper Mississippi River. Extends into Itasca County.
20	Winnibigoshish Resort	Winnibigoshish Resort	May 23, 1980 (#80001989)	1510 U.S. Route 2; 47°20′44″N 94°12′31″W	Bena	Eye-catching 1933 gas station and motel complex, a rare well-preserved example of a business built to attract early highway travelers. Now the Big Winnie General Store and RV Park.

== Former listings ==
	Name on the Register	Image	Date listed	Date removed	Location	City or town	Description
1	Minnesota State Sanatorium for Consumptives	Minnesota State Sanatorium for Consumptives	July 25, 2001 (#01000766)	May 28, 2019	7232 Ah-Gwah-Ching Rd., NW.	Walker vicinity	Minnesota's most significant tuberculosis treatment center, also known as Ah-Gwah-Ching; in operation 1906–1962. Demolished in 2008.
2	Julius Neils House		June 20, 1980 (#80001991)	July 5, 2006	North 3rd Street	Cass Lake	1900 frame house of a lumber entrepreneur. Burned down in 2005.
3	Sixth Street Commercial Building		May 23, 1980 (#80001995)	May 15, 1987	525 6th St.	Walker	1910 brick store. Demolished in 1985.

== See also ==
- List of National Historic Landmarks in Minnesota
- National Register of Historic Places listings in Minnesota
