= Beulah Township, Cass County, Minnesota =

Beulah Township, Minnesota
- Township
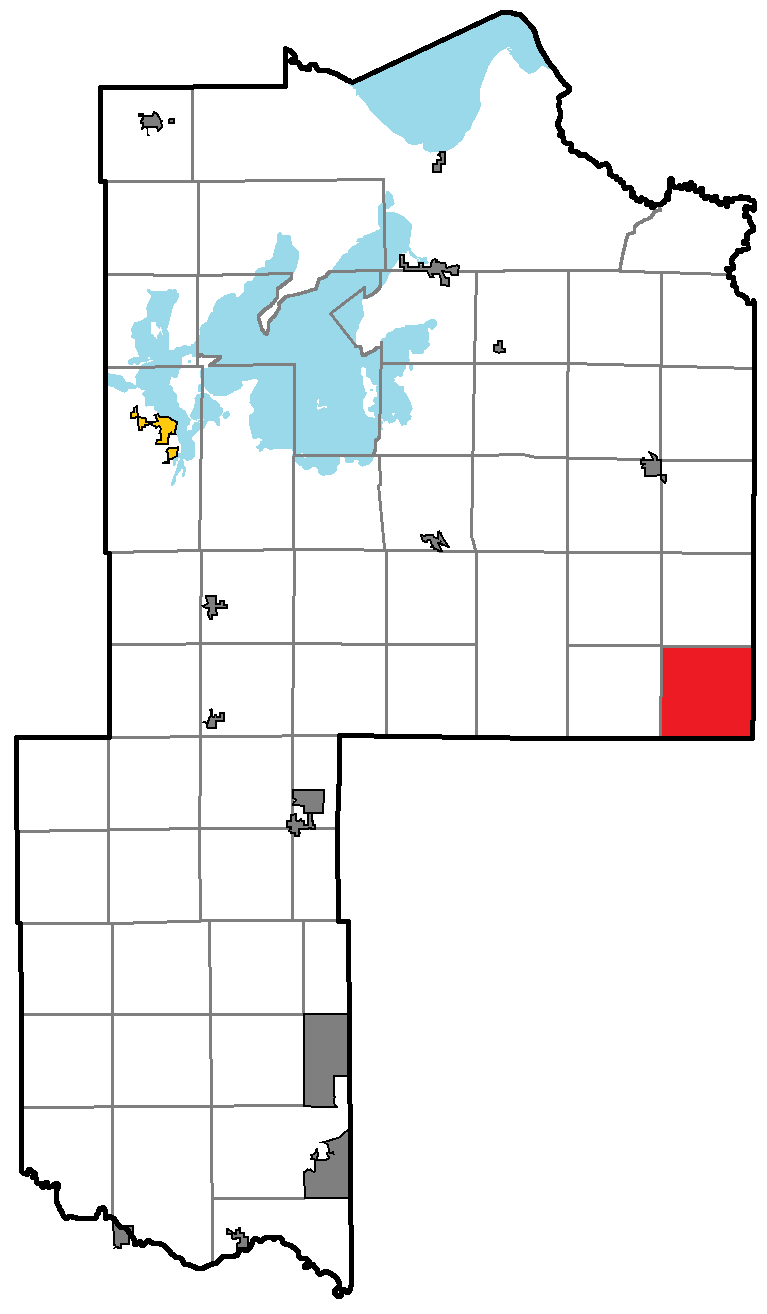
- Location of Beulah Township, within Cass County, Minnesota
- Coordinates: 46°51′4″N 93°50′58″W
- Country: United States
- State: Minnesota
- County: Cass

Area
  - Total: 35.7 sq mi (92.5 km^{2})
  - Land: 34.6 sq mi (89.7 km^{2})
  - Water: 1.1 sq mi (2.8 km^{2})
- Elevation: 1,309 ft (399 m)

Population (2020)
  - Total: 72
  - Density: 2.1/sq mi (0.80/km^{2})
- Time zone: UTC-6 (Central (CST))
  - Summer (DST): UTC-5 (CDT)
- ZIP code: 56662
- Area code: 218
- FIPS code: 27-05572
- GNIS feature ID: 0663581

Beulah Township is a township in Cass County, Minnesota, United States. The population was 72 as of the 2020 census. Beulah Township was named for Beulah Olds, a pioneer settler.

== Geography ==
According to the United States Census Bureau, the township has a total area of 35.7 square miles (92 km^{2}), of which 34.7 square miles (90 km^{2}) is land and 1.1 square miles (2.8 km^{2}) (3.00%) is water.

=== Unincorporated communities ===
- Mae

=== Lakes ===
- Edna Lake
- Egg Lake
- Little Reservoir Lake
- Lake Leavitt (east half)
- Morrison Lake
- Oxbox Lake (east quarter)
- Reservoir Lake
- Rice Pad Lake
- Schafer Lake
- Tank Lake
- Third Guide Lake
- Wren Lake (vast majority)

=== Adjacent townships ===
- Smoky Hollow Township (north)
- Little Pine Township, Crow Wing County (south)
- Crooked Lake Township (west)
- Thunder Lake Township (northwest)

== Demographics ==
As of the census of 2000, there were 57 people, 28 households, and 19 families residing in the township. The population density was 1.6 inhabitants per square mile (0.62/km^{2}). There were 112 housing units at an average density of 3.2 per square mile (1.2/km^{2}). The racial makeup of the township was 98.25% White, and 1.75% from two or more races.

There were 28 households, out of which 14.3% had children under the age of 18 living with them, 64.3% were married couples living together, and 28.6% were non-families. 28.6% of all households were made up of individuals, and 10.7% had someone living alone who was 65 years of age or older. The average household size was 2.04 and the average family size was 2.40.

In the township the population was spread out, with 10.5% under the age of 18, 7.0% from 25 to 44, 54.4% from 45 to 64, and 28.1% who were 65 years of age or older. The median age was 55 years. For every 100 females, there were 159.1 males. For every 100 females age 18 and over, there were 142.9 males.

The median income for a household in the township was $26,875, and the median income for a family was $25,000. Males had a median income of $51,250 versus $38,750 for females. The per capita income for the township was $16,613. There were 16.7% of families and 15.9% of the population living below the poverty line, including 75.0% of under eighteens and none of those over 64.
