= Wilkinson, Minnesota =

Unincorporated community in Minnesota, US

Wilkinson
- Unincorporated community
- Location within Minnesota Location within the United States
- Coordinates: 47°15′03″N 94°37′40″W
- Country: United States
- State: Minnesota
- County: Cass
- Township: Wilkinson Township
- Elevation: 1,316 ft (401 m)
- Time zone: UTC-6 (Central (CST))
  - Summer (DST): UTC-5 (CDT)
- ZIP code: 56633
- Area code: 218
- GNIS feature ID: 659012

Wilkinson is an unincorporated community in Wilkinson Township, Cass County, Minnesota, United States, near Cass Lake and Walker. It is located along State Highway 371 (MN 371) near 122nd Street NW.

== Education ==
The community is served by Cass Lake-Bena Schools.
