= Raboin, Minnesota =

Unincorporated community in Minnesota, US

Raboin
- Unincorporated community
- Location within Minnesota Location within the United States
- Coordinates: 47°17′15″N 94°37′33″W
- Country: United States
- State: Minnesota
- County: Cass
- Township: Wilkinson Township
- Elevation: 1,316 ft (401 m)
- Time zone: UTC-6 (Central (CST))
  - Summer (DST): UTC-5 (CDT)
- ZIP code: 56633
- Area code: 218
- GNIS feature ID: 2071270

Raboin is an unincorporated community in Wilkinson Township, Cass County, Minnesota, United States, near Cass Lake and Walker. It is located along State Highway 371 (MN 371) near 134th Street NW.

Raboin is named after settler Joseph M. Raboin, who served as the first postmaster in the community.

The post office was established at Raboin in 1911, and remained in operation until it was discontinued in 1936. In early years, the community hosted a store, school, and spur track on the Great Northern Railway.
