= Inguadona, Minnesota =

Unincorporated community in Minnesota, US

Inguadona
- Unincorporated community
- Location within Minnesota Location within the United States
- Coordinates: 46°59′00″N 94°07′49″W
- Country: United States
- State: Minnesota
- County: Cass
- Township: Inguadona Township and Trelipe Township
- Elevation: 1,306 ft (398 m)
- Time zone: UTC-6 (Central (CST))
  - Summer (DST): UTC-5 (CDT)
- ZIP code: 56655 and 56672
- Area code: 218
- GNIS feature ID: 659093

Inguadona is an unincorporated community in Cass County, Minnesota, United States. It is near Longville and Remer along Cass County Road 7, near 28th Avenue NE. Inguadona is located within Inguadona and Trelipe Townships.

The word Inguadona is Sioux in origin, and is reported to mean "End of the trail."
