= Conservation Building (Walker, Minnesota) =

Historic place in Cass County, Minnesota

- U.S. National Register of Historic Places
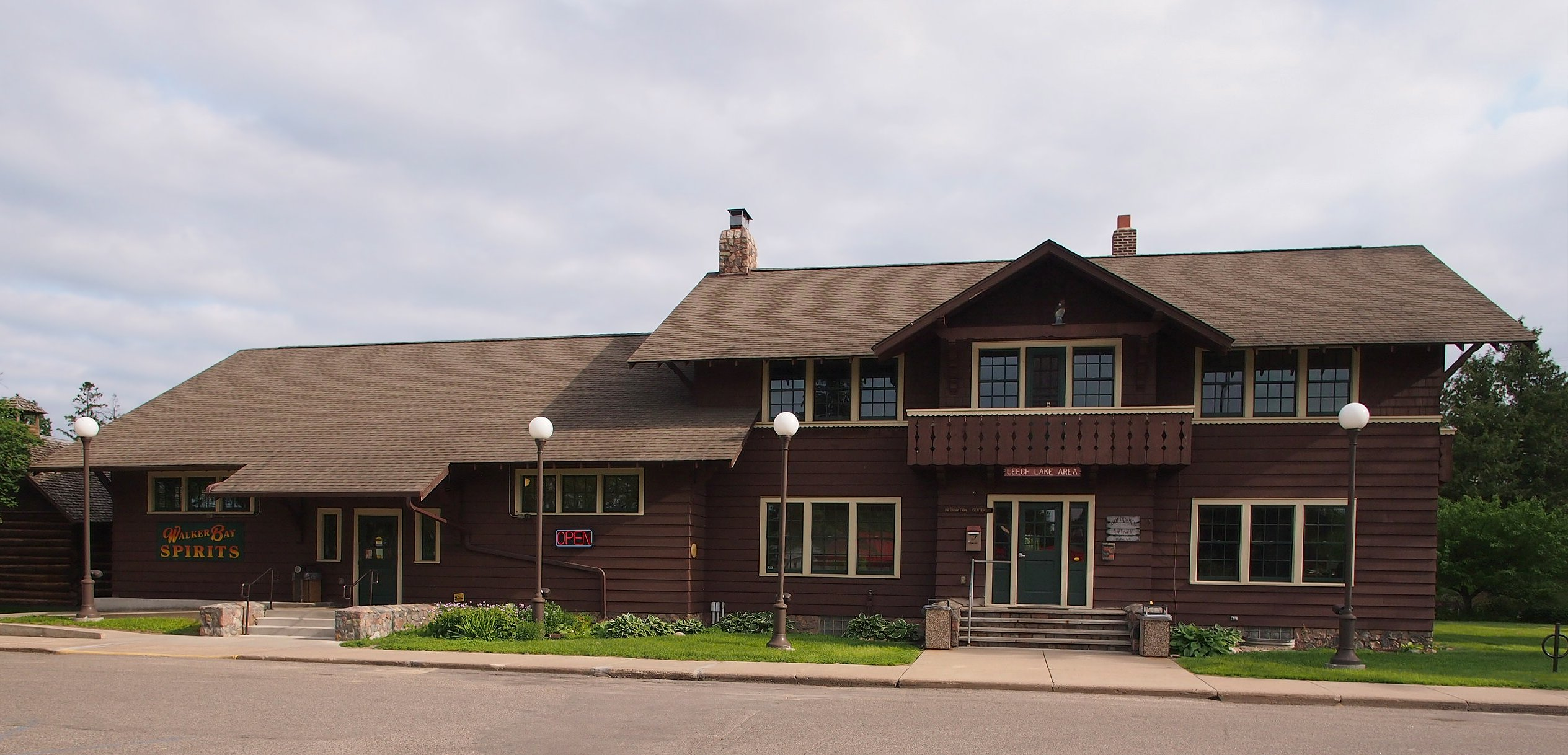

- Location within Minnesota Location within the United States
- Location: 205 Minnesota Avenue, Walker, Minnesota
- Coordinates: 47.101378°N 94.578429°W
- Built: 1934–1936
- Architect: Donald J.C. Parsons
- Foreman: Ed Wold
- Architectural style: Swiss chalet / Craftsman
- NRHP reference No.: 02001706
- Added to NRHP: January 15, 2003

The Conservation Building is a historic structure located in Walker, Cass County, Minnesota. Built during the Great Depression between 1934 and 1936, it was constructed with the support of state and federal New Deal agencies in an effort to aid and publicize environmental conservation.

The building features a two-story segment originally accommodating various local government offices and state conservation facilities. In addition to its core function, it played a part in boosting the area's economy through tourism, with a supplementary museum providing a collection of local wildlife exhibits featuring scenes of taxidermied specimens of native fauna.

The building was listed on the National Register of Historic Places on January 15, 2003.

== Features ==
=== Museum ===
The eastern half of the Conservation Building is a large, single-room museum completed around 1947, highlighting Northern Minnesota wildlife. The museum's components include several taxidermy diorama exhibits featuring native animals, head mounts of deer and buffalo, and various display cases. Works Progress Administration foreman Isaac Collins and his assistant Lawrence Dennis oversaw the construction of the museum's interior.

By 1947, the museum's exhibits were finalized, with the Izaak Walton League of America aiding in completion that same year.

==== Dioramas ====
Throughout the 1930s, numerous taxidermy scenes were installed in the museum. Much of the taxidermy work was performed by Minnesota resident Alph Peck, while Austin O. Sarff, a Walker local, created the landscape artistry and assisted in organizing the exhibits.

The first diorama to be included was a scene showcasing a family of five beavers, donated by the Minnesota Fish and Game Division and installed around November of 1935. In July of 1936, the Walker Pilot reported that Peck and Sarff had completed a second diorama featuring a winter scene of three deer, and that a summer counterpart was in preparation. The issue also stated that "groups of foxes, wolves, bears, a collection of pheasants, a wild duck scene, and a number of small exhibits" were planned for integration.

Over time, several more scenes would be sited at the museum, such as those illustrating a watch tower and campground, bobcats, swans and badgers. In total, ten dioramas are positioned throughout the room, in addition to six smaller scenes featuring endemic plants and animals.

=== Two-story section ===
The two-story portion of the Conservation Building originally housed offices for several New Deal-era state and local government agencies and projects. County branches of Minnesota's state relief agency occupied the upper floor, covering Cass, Hubbard and Wadena. Additional work in this section supported the augmentation of Chippewa National Forest, the regulation of white pine blister rust, highway engineering planning for a nearby Civilian Conservation Corps camp, and land procurement for the newly established local forestry district. The federal Works Progress Administration supported several of these efforts.

The Leech Lake Area Chamber of Commerce now occupies the section.

== History ==
=== Construction period ===
The Conservation Building was conceived of in September 1933 when Daniel DeLury, member of the local conservation group Walker Conservation Unit No. 1, suggested that $25,000 in federal funds be appropriated to its construction. Preliminary estimates the next year placed the price of construction at roughly $17,000.

In early 1934, the building's initial plans were outlined for a 40-by-50-foot wood-frame structure in the Swiss chalet style, with bids for construction materials being placed throughout June 1934. Excavation began in July 1934, and by September of that year considerable progress was made on the first floor. Work would continue throughout the next few months. By May 1935, landscaping had progressed, and a new rock garden was in place on the property. In August 1935, it was noted that the museum was developing quickly.

Following the creation of the Works Progress Administration in July 1935, funding shortages pushed the Walker Village Council to request a $3,525 grant so that the remaining parts of the Conservation Building and surrounding projects on the property could be completed. The grant was accepted, and by November 1935 the Conservation Building was close to completion; work was focused on the expansion of the rock garden and landscaping improvements. In December 1935, a new heating system was installed to replace the old kerosene heaters. Work in 1936 centered on finalizing the grounds around the building and expanding the museum. The museum's exhibits would continue expanding until 1947.

The Conservation Building's construction was supported by the Federal Emergency Relief Administration (FERA), which provided labor. The position of foreman was assigned to Ed Wold, who was joined by Walker mayor Grindall and two members of the Walker Village Council in overseeing construction. Work on the surrounding landscape was led by A. R. Nichols. Harold E. Olson of the Minnesota Department of Highways collaborated with Nichols on improving nearby Highway 371, which impacted the site of the Conservation Building and drew Nichols into the construction project; the two sited the Conservation Building around July 1934.

=== Later events ===
In April 1940, the Conservation Building employed around ten women reliant on government financial aid, producing Native American crafts to be sold in the building's museum. A month later, the WPA in Detroit Lakes delivered additional Ojibwe arts and crafts to the museum, which were put on display and up for sale.

An office dedicated to providing information for regional tourists was incorporated into the building in May 1941.

In October 1949, the Walker Pilot published a statement by museum landscape artist Austin O. Sarff, who reported that "over 31,000 guests...registered at the Museum booth" from June to September of that year.

According to an August 1975 issue of the Brainerd Daily Dispatch, an arts and crafts event took place at the Conservation Building that month in concurrence with the city's annual fishing contest.

On January 15, 2003, an entry for the Conservation Building was added to the National Register of Historic Places.
