= Wahnata County, Minnesota Territory =

Wahnata County was an extinct county in Minnesota Territory. Created as one of the original 9 counties in 1849, Wahnata County was located south of Mahkahto County and north of Dakota County. It was bounded to the north by a line from the mouth of the Crow Wing River to the Missouri River, and to the south by a line from the Clearwater River to the Missouri River. The population was 160 at the 1850 United States census.

The name is recorded as "Wahnahta" by the 1st Minnesota Territorial Legislature and the 1850 United States census.

The county was dissolved in 1851 to form Pembina County and Cass County. Parts of the original county are now parts of 24 counties.

== Minnesota ==
- Morrison County
- Stearns County
- Todd County
- Otter Tail County
- Grant County
- Douglas County
- Pope County
- Stevens County
- Wilkin County
- Traverse County
- Big Stone County

== South Dakota ==
- Roberts County
- Marshall County
- Day County
- Brown County
- McPherson County
- Edmunds County
- Campbell County
- Walworth County

== North Dakota ==
- Richland County
- Sargent County
- Dickey County
- McIntosh County
- Emmons County
