= Brevik, Minnesota =

Unincorporated community in Minnesota, US

Brevik
- Unincorporated community
- Location within Minnesota Location within the United States
- Coordinates: 47°04′59″N 94°17′19″W
- Country: United States
- State: Minnesota
- County: Cass
- Township: Boy Lake Township
- Elevation: 1,329 ft (405 m)
- Time zone: UTC-6 (Central (CST))
  - Summer (DST): UTC-5 (CDT)
- ZIP code: 56655
- Area code: 218
- GNIS feature ID: 655512

Brevik is an unincorporated community in Boy Lake Township, Cass County, Minnesota, United States, near Longville. It is along Cass County Road 39 near Liens Lane.
