= Boy River, Minnesota =

City in Minnesota, United States

- City
- Location of Boy River within Cass County, Minnesota
- Coordinates: 47°10′04″N 94°07′32″W
- Country: United States
- State: Minnesota
- County: Cass
- Incorporated: April 7, 1922

Area
  - Total: 0.373 sq mi (0.967 km^{2})
  - Land: 0.373 sq mi (0.967 km^{2})
  - Water: 0 sq mi (0.000 km^{2})
- Elevation: 1,319 ft (402 m)

Population (2020)
  - Total: 26
  - Estimate (2022): 29
  - Density: 69.6/sq mi (26.89/km^{2})
- Time zone: UTC−6 (Central (CST))
  - Summer (DST): UTC−5 (CDT)
- ZIP Code: 56672
- Area code: 218
- FIPS code: 27-07174
- GNIS feature ID: 2394231
- Sales tax: 7.375%

Boy River is a city in Cass County, Minnesota, United States. The population was 26 at the 2020 census. It is part of the Brainerd Micropolitan Statistical Area.

== History ==
A post office called Boy River was established in 1910, and remained in operation until it was discontinued in 1985. The city took its name from the nearby Boy River. In 2018, the State of Minnesota denied the City of Boy River's petition to dissolve after a special election in which three of five total voters voted to not dissolve.

== Geography ==
According to the United States Census Bureau, the city has a total area of 0.373 square miles (0.97 km^{2}), all land. County Roads 4 and 63 are the main routes in the community.

== Demographics ==
Historical population
Census	Pop.	Note	%±
1930	92		—
1940	79		−14.1%
1950	82		3.8%
1960	51		−37.8%
1970	44		−13.7%
1980	50		13.6%
1990	43		−14.0%
2000	38		−11.6%
2010	47		23.7%
2020	26		−44.7%
2022 (est.)	29		11.5%
U.S. Decennial Census; 2020 Census

=== 2010 census ===
As of the 2010 census, there were 47 people, 21 households, and 10 families living in the city. The population density was 127.0 inhabitants per square mile (49.0/km^{2}). There were 33 housing units at an average density of 89.2 per square mile (34.4/km^{2}). The racial makeup of the city was 100.0% White.

There were 21 households, of which 38.1% had children under the age of 18 living with them, 23.8% were married couples living together, 19.0% had a female householder with no husband present, 4.8% had a male householder with no wife present, and 52.4% were non-families. 52.4% of all households were made up of individuals, and 14.3% had someone living alone who was 65 years of age or older. The average household size was 2.24 and the average family size was 3.10.

The median age in the city was 33.5 years. 31.9% of residents were under the age of 18; 6.4% were between the ages of 18 and 24; 27.7% were from 25 to 44; 27.6% were from 45 to 64; and 6.4% were 65 years of age or older. The gender makeup of the city was 44.7% male and 55.3% female.

=== 2000 census ===
As of the 2000 census, there were 38 people, 18 households, and 9 families living in the city. The population density was 89.0 inhabitants per square mile (34.4/km^{2}). There were 27 housing units at an average density of 63.2 per square mile (24.4/km^{2}). The racial makeup of the city was 84.21% White, 13.16% Native American, and 2.63% from two or more races. Hispanic or Latino of any race were 2.63% of the population.

There were 18 households, out of which 22.2% had children under the age of 18 living with them, 27.8% were married couples living together, 16.7% had a female householder with no husband present, and 50.0% were non-families. 50.0% of all households were made up of individuals, and 27.8% had someone living alone who was 65 years of age or older. The average household size was 2.11 and the average family size was 3.11.

In the city, the population was spread out, with 28.9% under the age of 18, 7.9% from 18 to 24, 21.1% from 25 to 44, 18.4% from 45 to 64, and 23.7% who were 65 years of age or older. The median age was 41 years. For every 100 females, there were 90.0 males. For every 100 females age 18 and over, there were 68.8 males.

The median income for a household in the city was $13,125, and the median income for a family was $43,125. Males had a median income of $24,375 versus $21,250 for females. The per capita income for the city was $10,556. There were no families and 24.0% of the population living below the poverty line, including no under eighteens and 42.9% of those over 64.
