= Wahnena, Minnesota =

Unorganized territory of Cass County, Minnesota, United States

- Unorganized territory
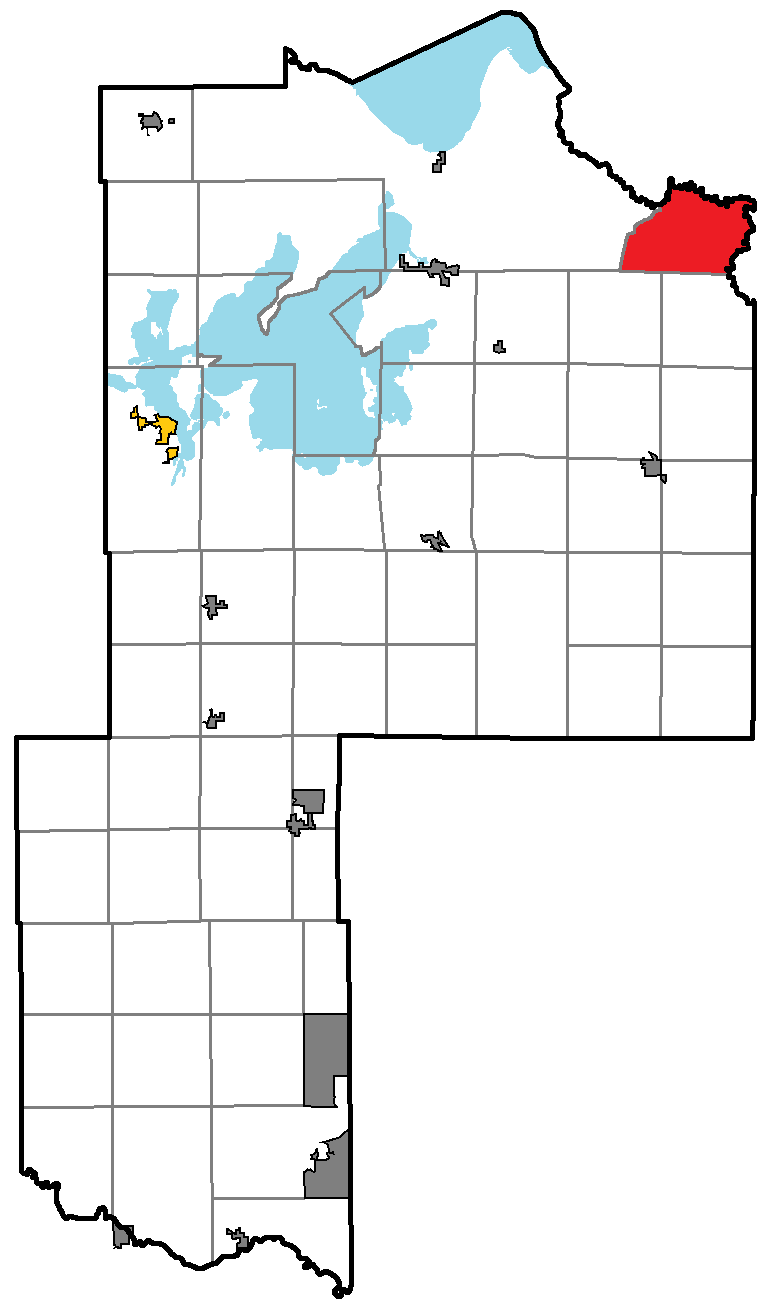
- Location of Wahnena, within Cass County, Minnesota
- Coordinates: 47°16′23″N 93°51′51″W
- Country: United States
- State: Minnesota
- County: Cass

Area
  - Total: 34.8 sq mi (90 km^{2})
  - Land: 34 sq mi (88 km^{2})
  - Water: 0.8 sq mi (2.1 km^{2})

Population (2020)
  - Total: 169
  - Density: 5.0/sq mi (1.9/km^{2})
- Time zone: UTC–6 (CST)
  - Summer (DST): UTC–5 (CDT)
- ZIP Code: 56636
- Area code: 218

Wahnena is an unorganized territory located in Cass County, Minnesota, United States. The population was 169 as of the 2020 Decennial census. It is part of the Brainerd Micropolitan Statistical Area. Wahnena was named for an Ojibwe chief.

== Geography ==
According to the United States Census Bureau, the unorganized territory has a total area of 34.8 square miles (90 km^{2}), of which 34.0 square miles (88 km^{2}) is land and 0.8 square miles (2.1 km^{2}) (2.30%) is water.

== Demographics ==
=== Population and people ===
Population pyramid 2022
#	Males	Age	Females	#
0		85+		0
0		80–84		0
5		75–79		5
0		70–74		0
0		65–69		0
10		60–64		9
4		55–59		6
14		50–54		0
0		45–49		5
14		40–44		0
5		35–39		14
0		30–34		0
0		25–29		0
10		20–24		0
0		15–19		0
6		10–14		0
17		5–9		7
0		0–4		0
- Source: ACS 5-Year Estimates Subject Tables [These amounts are approximate absolute numbers, not percentage]

As of 2022 Decennial Census, there were 169 people and 67 households residing in the unorganized territory. The population density hence was 4.9 people per square mile (1.9 people/km^{2}). The racial makeup was 88.76% (150 people) White, 5.92% (10 people) Native American Indian and Alaskan, 0.59% (1 person) Hispanic or Latino and 5.33% (9 people) from two or more races.

The current population residing in the unorganized territory had 37.5% German ancestry, 19.4% Polish ancestry, 17.4% Norwegian ancestry and 11.1% Irish ancestry.

In the unorganized territory, the population varied with age, with 22.9% under the age of 18; 7.6% were 65 years of age or older (as of 2022 Decennial Census); 5.9% from 18 to 24; 19.4% from 25 to 44; and 28.4% from 45 to 64. However, there was no one over 85 years. For every 100 females; there were 184.78 males, for every 100 females age 18 and over, there were 328.6 males (as of 2022 ACS 5-Year Estimates Subject Tables). The median age was 40.5 years.

=== Households and families ===
There were 67 households as of 2022, 43.3% were married couples living together, 41.8% had a male householder with no spouse present, 7.5% had a female householder with no spouse present, and 23.8% were never-married. The average household size was 2.73 and the average family size was 3.03.

=== Housing ===
As of 2022 Decennial Census, there were 89 housing units, out of which, 62 were occupied and 27 were vacant. Hence housing units are at an average density of 2.6 per square mile (1.0/km^{2}).

As of 2022 American Community Survey 5-Year Estimates, all of the occupied units' paying rent was between $1000 and $1499. The median gross paying rent was unknown, although it was $874 in Cass County, Minnesota, alone. Homeownership rate may have been around 92.5%. 27.4% houses valued at $50,000 to $99,999; 38.7% valued at $100,000 to $149,999; 17.7% valued at $200,000 to $299,999; 16.1% valued at $300,000 to $499,999. 29 housing units were owned by married couples. No householder had moved in during 2021 or later.

6% units had one bedroom only, 86.6% units had two or three bedrooms, and 7.5% units had 4 or more bedrooms.

=== Income and Employment ===
As of 2022 American Community Survey 5-Year Estimates, the median income for a household in the unorganized territory was $70,694, the median income for a family was $66,875, the median income for a married-couple family was $66,875, and the median income for a non-family household was $88,750. The per capita income was $25,895. 3.8% of all people were below the poverty line, or 5.5% of people between age 18 to 64 years, not above or below that. Males had a median income of $25,000 versus $21,875 for females.

As of 2022 American Community Survey 5-Year Estimates, 42.7% of workers are employed in private companies; 14.6% are local, state and federal government workers; and 42.7% are self-employed, in own not incorporated business and unpaid family workers. Average travel time to work is 33.7 minutes. 65.9 percent of workers drive alone to work, and 34.1% workers work from home. The employment rate in the unorganized territory is 81.2%. Mean usual hours worked for males is 38.4, compared to the 33.9 hours for females.

24.5% of people from 16 years of age and above work in the agriculture, forestry, fishing, hunting and mining industry; 13.4% work in construction; 9.8% work in manufacturing; 6.1% in wholesale trade; 7.3% in transportation, warehousing and utilities; 12.2% in real-estate, fiance, insurance, rental and leasing; 6.1% in professional, scientific, management, administrative and waste management services; 9.8% in education, healthcare and social assistance; 6.1% in arts, entertainment, recreation, accommodation and food services; 4.9% in public administration.

20 people work in management, business, science and arts occupation; 10 work in service occupations; 21 work in sales and office occupations; and 31 work in natural resources, construction and maintenance occupation.

=== Education ===
As of 2022 American Community Survey 5-Year Estimates, 11% attained a bachelor's degree or higher in the unorganized territory, school enrollment was around 83.3%. 16.7% of children over 3 years of age studied in preschool and 83.3% studied from kindergarten to 12th grade.

=== Health ===
As of 2022 American Community Survey 5-Year Estimates, nobody was disabled. The total fertility is 19. Everybody has a healthcare coverage in the unorganized territory.
