= Esterdy, Minnesota =

Unincorporated community in Minnesota, US

Esterdy
- Unincorporated community
- Location within Minnesota Location within the United States
- Coordinates: 46°28′36″N 94°43′57″W
- Country: United States
- State: Minnesota
- County: Cass
- Township: Byron Township
- Elevation: 1,270 ft (390 m)
- Time zone: UTC-6 (Central (CST))
  - Summer (DST): UTC-5 (CDT)
- ZIP code: 56466 and 56479
- Area code: 218
- GNIS feature ID: 654697

Esterdy (also spelled Esterday) is an unincorporated community in Byron Township, Cass County, Minnesota, United States, near Motley and Staples. It is along 90th Street SW near 85th Avenue SW.
