= Mae, Minnesota =

Unincorporated community in Minnesota, US

Mae
- Unincorporated community
- Location within Minnesota Location within the United States
- Coordinates: 46°49′56″N 93°51′56″W
- Country: United States
- State: Minnesota
- County: Cass
- Township: Beulah Township
- Elevation: 1,302 ft (397 m)
- Time zone: UTC-6 (Central (CST))
  - Summer (DST): UTC-5 (CDT)
- ZIP code: 56662
- Area code: 218
- GNIS feature ID: 657279

Mae is an unincorporated community in Beulah Township, Cass County, Minnesota, United States, near Outing and Emily. It is located along Cass County Road 58, near Morrison Lake Road NE.
