= Upper Hay Lake Archeological District =

Historic district in Minnesota, United States

- U.S. National Register of Historic Places
- U.S. Historic district
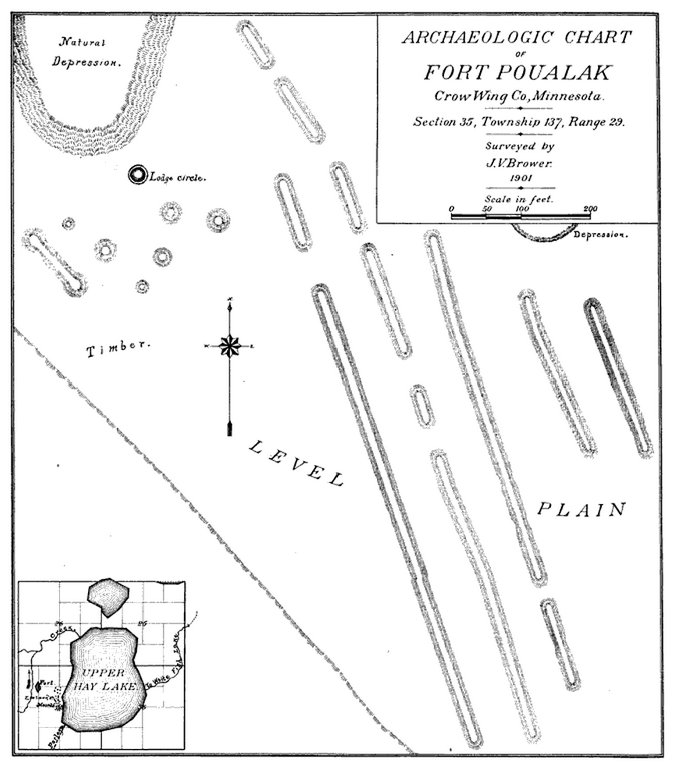
- Partial 1901 survey map of Upper Hay Lake Archeological District
- Location: Address restricted, Jenkins Township, Minnesota
- Built: 800–1600 CE
- NRHP reference No.: 74001016
- Designated HD: January 21, 1974

The Upper Hay Lake Archeological District (Smithsonian trinomials 21CW7 and 21CW14) is a prehistoric Native American archaeological site in Jenkins Township, Minnesota, United States. It consists of about 75 linear mounds—including one of the state's longest at 725 feet (221 m)—plus the sites of a village and a portage. The mound grouping has also been dubbed Fort Poualak. The site was listed on the National Register of Historic Places in 1978 for having local significance in the theme of archaeology. It was nominated for indicating an area of substantial activity during the Blackduck phase of the Late Woodland period.

== Description ==
The Upper Hay Lake Archeological District has two main groupings of features. The village site is near the shore of Upper Hay Lake, while the mound grouping—also known as Fort Poualak—is 900 feet (270 m) to the northwest. Although they were given separate Smithsonian trinomials, the two groupings are considered one site.

The linear mounds are arranged in five parallel rows, separated by 50 or 60 feet (15 or 18 m). The eastern two rows are the shortest, running only 230 feet (70 m). The longer rows are broken by gaps of 20 to 50 feet (6 to 15 m). The longest unbroken embankment is an estimated 725 feet (221 m) long. An early survey also noted the circular depression of a lodge nearby.

== Archaeological history ==
Jacob V. Brower first documented the site in 1897, excavating one mound and removing some bone material. He returned to conduct a more thorough survey from May 20 to 29, 1901. Brower carefully estimated that the mounds had required 10,108 short tons (9,170 t) of soil to construct. It was he who dubbed the linear mound grouping "Fort Poualak".

In the 1930s, local resident Frithiof T. Gustavson developed a strong interest in archaeology and conducted amateur excavations at the site. He recovered several artifacts from the occupation phase, including an intact ceramic pot that became known as the "Fort Poualak Pot". Gustavson exhibited these relics widely, delivering lectures at schools and county fairs, and ultimately became superintendent of a museum in Cass Lake. Gustavson's descendants donated the pot to the Minnesota Historical Society in 1997. It was classified as St. Croix Stamped ware and carbon from its outer surface was radiocarbon dated to 550 C.E. An analysis of residues on the interior of the pot found traces of wild rice.

Following reports that the site may have been damaged by private timber harvesting, the state arranged a Lidar survey in 2010. Only about 50 of the mounds were found to be still extant.

== See also ==
- National Register of Historic Places listings in Crow Wing County, Minnesota
