= Leader, Minnesota =

Unincorporated community in Minnesota, US

Leader
- Unincorporated community
- Location within Minnesota Location within the United States
- Coordinates: 46°31′43″N 94°39′18″W
- Country: United States
- State: Minnesota
- County: Cass
- Township: Byron Township and Meadow Brook Township
- Elevation: 1,365 ft (416 m)
- Time zone: UTC-6 (Central (CST))
  - Summer (DST): UTC-5 (CDT)
- ZIP code: 56466
- Area code: 218
- GNIS feature ID: 646556

Leader otherwise known as Leader area, or LA, is an unincorporated community in Cass County, Minnesota, United States, near Motley. It is along Highway 64 (MN 64) near 76th Street SW.

Leader is known regionally for its draw to outdoor enthusiasts, including the Snoway 1 trailhead, as well as its relative isolation from the nearest incorporated community.
