= Cass County, Minnesota =

County in Minnesota, United States

- County
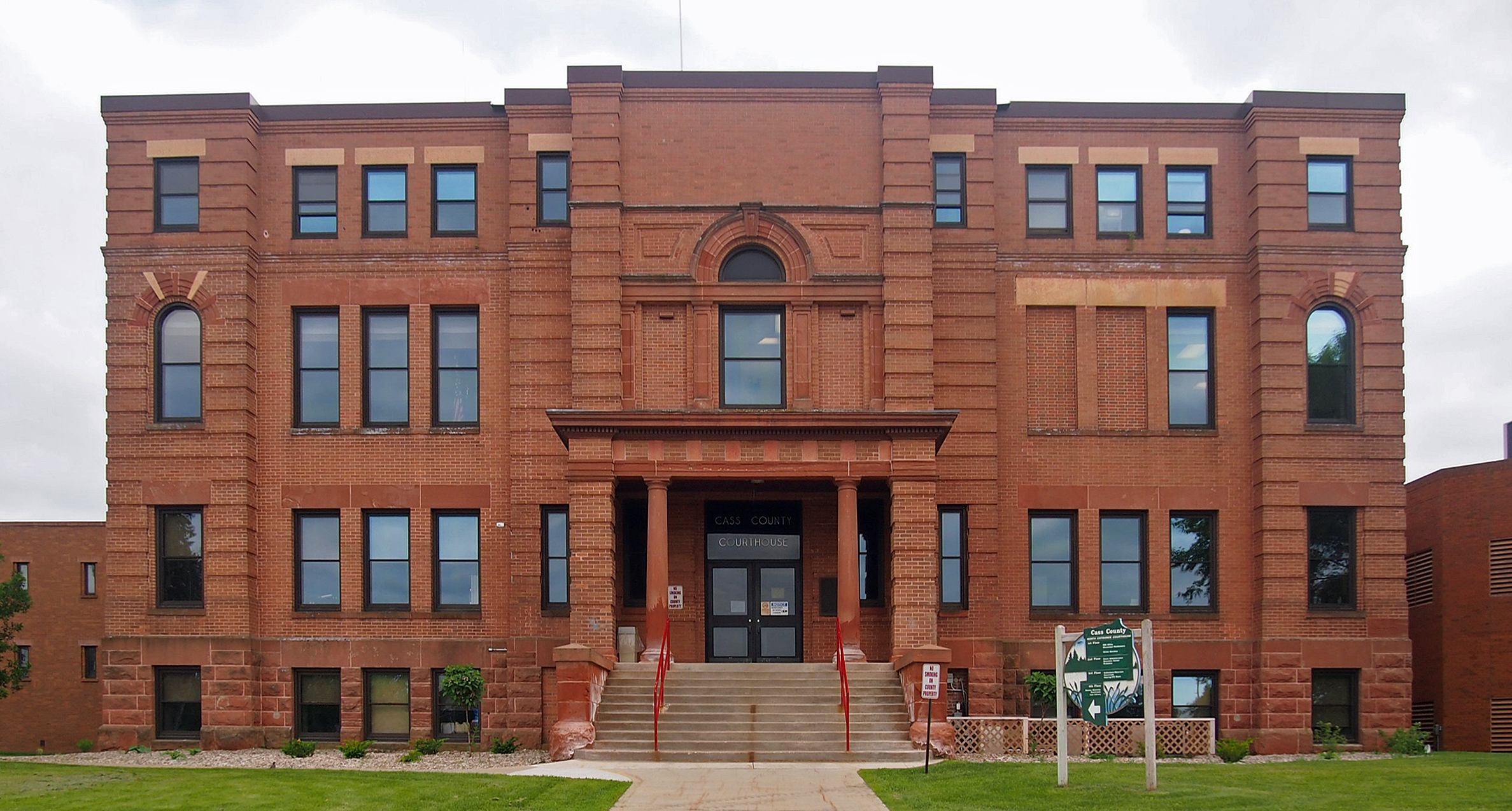
- The Cass County Courthouse

- Location within the U.S. state of Minnesota
- Coordinates: 46°57′N 94°19′W
- Country: United States
- State: Minnesota
- Created: September 1, 1851
- Organized: 1897
- Named for: Lewis Cass
- Seat: Walker
- Largest city: Lake Shore

Area
  - Total: 2,414 sq mi (6,250 km^{2})
  - Land: 2,022 sq mi (5,240 km^{2})
  - Water: 393 sq mi (1,020 km^{2}) 16%

Population (2020)
  - Total: 30,066
  - Estimate (2025): 31,430 ▲
  - Density: 14.9/sq mi (5.8/km^{2})
- Time zone: UTC−6 (Central)
  - Summer (DST): UTC−5 (CDT)
- Congressional district: 8th
- Website: www.casscountymn.gov

Cass County is a county in the central part of the U.S. state of Minnesota. As of the 2020 census, the population was 30,066. Its county seat is Walker. The county was formed in 1851, and was organized in 1897.

Cass County is included in the Brainerd, MN Micropolitan Statistical Area.

A substantial part of the Leech Lake Indian Reservation is in the county.

== History ==
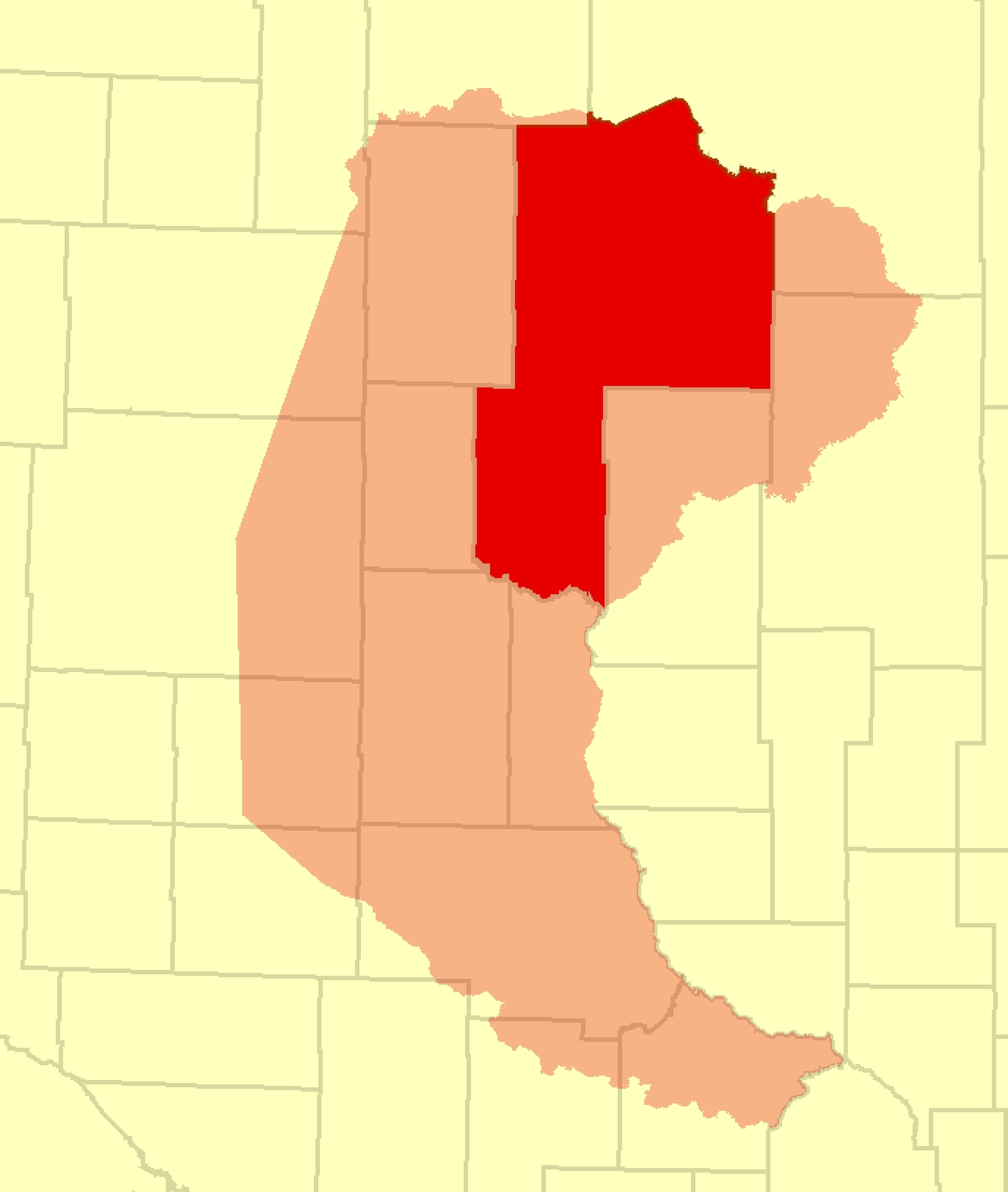
Cass County of 1851 (pink) and today (red)

Cass County was created on September 1, 1851, by the Minnesota Territory legislature, although its government was not organized until 1897. The county was formed of areas partitioned from Dakota, Mahkatah, Pembina and Wahnata Counties. It was named for Lewis Cass, a Michigan political figure of the 19th century. Before it was organized several parcels of county land were partitioned off to augment or form adjacent counties.

Soils of Cass County

== Geography ==
The Crow Wing River flows east-southeast along Cass County's southern border, and the Gull River flows southwest through the lower part, to discharge into the Crow Wing on the southern border. The terrain consists of wooded rolling hills, heavily dotted with lakes and ponds, and slopes to the south and east; its highest point is on the upper western border, at 1,614 ft (492 m) ASL. The county has an area of 2,414 square miles (6,250 km^{2}), of which 2,022 square miles (5,240 km^{2}) is land and 393 square miles (1,020 km^{2}) (16%) is water.

=== Major highways ===
- US Highway 2
- Minnesota State Highway 6
- Minnesota State Highway 34
- Minnesota State Highway 64
- Minnesota State Highway 84
- Minnesota State Highway 87
- Minnesota State Highway 200
- Minnesota State Highway 210
- Minnesota State Highway 371
- List of county roads

=== Adjacent counties ===
- Itasca County - northeast
- Aitkin County - east
- Crow Wing County - southeast
- Morrison County - south
- Todd County - southwest
- Wadena County - west
- Hubbard County - northwest
- Beltrami County - north

=== Protected areas ===
- Buena Vista State Forest (part)
- Chippewa National Forest (part)
- Crow Wing State Park (part)
- Foot Hills State Forest (part)

== Climate and weather ==
Walker, Minnesota

Climate chart (precipitation, max. and min. temperature)
J	F	M	A	M	J	J	A	S	O	N	D
0.7 18 0	0.6 25 5	1.4 36 18	2.2 52 32	3.3 66 44	4.1 74 54	4.1 79 59	3.4 76 57	3.5 66 48	2.8 52 36	1.3 35 21	0.9 21 6
- █ Average max. and min. temperatures in °F
- █ Precipitation totals in inches
- Source: The Weather Channel
Metric conversion
J	F	M	A	M	J	J	A	S	O	N	D
18 −8 −18	16 −4 −15	36 2 −8	55 11 0	83 19 7	103 23 12	104 26 15	86 24 14	89 19 9	71 11 2	33 2 −6	22 −6 −14
- █ Average max. and min. temperatures in °C
- █ Precipitation totals in mm

In recent years, average temperatures in the county seat of Walker have ranged from a low of 0 °F (−18 °C) in January to a high of 79 °F (26 °C) in July, although a record low of −44 °F (−42 °C) was recorded in February 1996 and a record high of 103 °F (39 °C) was recorded in August 1976. Average monthly precipitation ranged from 0.62 inches (16 mm) in February to 4.11 inches (104 mm) in July.

== Demographics ==
Historical population
Census	Pop.	Note	%±
1860	150		—
1870	380		153.3%
1880	486		27.9%
1890	1,247		156.6%
1900	7,777		523.7%
1910	11,620		49.4%
1920	15,897		36.8%
1930	15,591		−1.9%
1940	20,646		32.4%
1950	19,468		−5.7%
1960	16,720		−14.1%
1970	17,323		3.6%
1980	21,050		21.5%
1990	21,791		3.5%
2000	27,150		24.6%
2010	28,567		5.2%
2020	30,066		5.2%
2025 (est.)	31,430	▲	4.5%
U.S. Decennial Census; 1790-1960 1900-1990; 1990-2000 2010-2020

=== Racial and ethnic composition ===
Cass County, Minnesota – Racial and ethnic composition Note: the US Census treats Hispanic/Latino as an ethnic category. This table excludes Latinos from the racial categories and assigns them to a separate category. Hispanics/Latinos may be of any race.
Race / Ethnicity (NH = Non-Hispanic)	Pop 1980	Pop 1990	Pop 2000	Pop 2010	Pop 2020	% 1980	% 1990	% 2000	% 2010	% 2020
White alone (NH)	18,988	19,251	23,377	24,383	24,675	90.20%	88.34%	86.10%	85.35%	82.07%
Black or African American alone (NH)	14	38	31	59	64	0.07%	0.17%	0.11%	0.21%	0.21%
Native American or Alaska Native alone (NH)	1,895	2,356	3,056	3,092	3,424	9.00%	10.81%	11.26%	10.82%	11.39%
Asian alone (NH)	42	52	70	88	111	0.20%	0.24%	0.26%	0.31%	0.37%
Native Hawaiian or Pacific Islander alone (NH)	x	x	5	3	0	x	x	0.02%	0.01%	0.00%
Other race alone (NH)	5	0	10	12	96	0.02%	0.00%	0.04%	0.04%	0.32%
Mixed race or Multiracial (NH)	x	x	381	590	1,270	x	x	1.40%	2.07%	4.22%
Hispanic or Latino (any race)	106	94	220	340	426	0.50%	0.43%	0.81%	1.19%	1.42%
Total	21,050	21,791	27,150	28,567	30,066	100.00%	100.00%	100.00%	100.00%	100.00%

=== 2020 census ===
As of the 2020 census, the county had a population of 30,066. The median age was 50.3 years. 20.7% of residents were under the age of 18 and 27.1% of residents were 65 years of age or older. For every 100 females there were 105.5 males, and for every 100 females age 18 and over there were 104.0 males age 18 and over.

The racial makeup of the county was 82.5% White, 0.2% Black or African American, 11.7% American Indian and Alaska Native, 0.4% Asian, <0.1% Native Hawaiian and Pacific Islander, 0.5% from some other race, and 4.7% from two or more races. Hispanic or Latino residents of any race comprised 1.4% of the population.

<0.1% of residents lived in urban areas, while 100.0% lived in rural areas.

There were 12,614 households in the county, of which 22.8% had children under the age of 18 living in them. Of all households, 52.3% were married-couple households, 20.5% were households with a male householder and no spouse or partner present, and 19.6% were households with a female householder and no spouse or partner present. About 28.1% of all households were made up of individuals and 14.3% had someone living alone who was 65 years of age or older.

There were 23,872 housing units, of which 47.2% were vacant. Among occupied housing units, 83.8% were owner-occupied and 16.2% were renter-occupied. The homeowner vacancy rate was 1.8% and the rental vacancy rate was 7.8%.

=== 2000 census ===
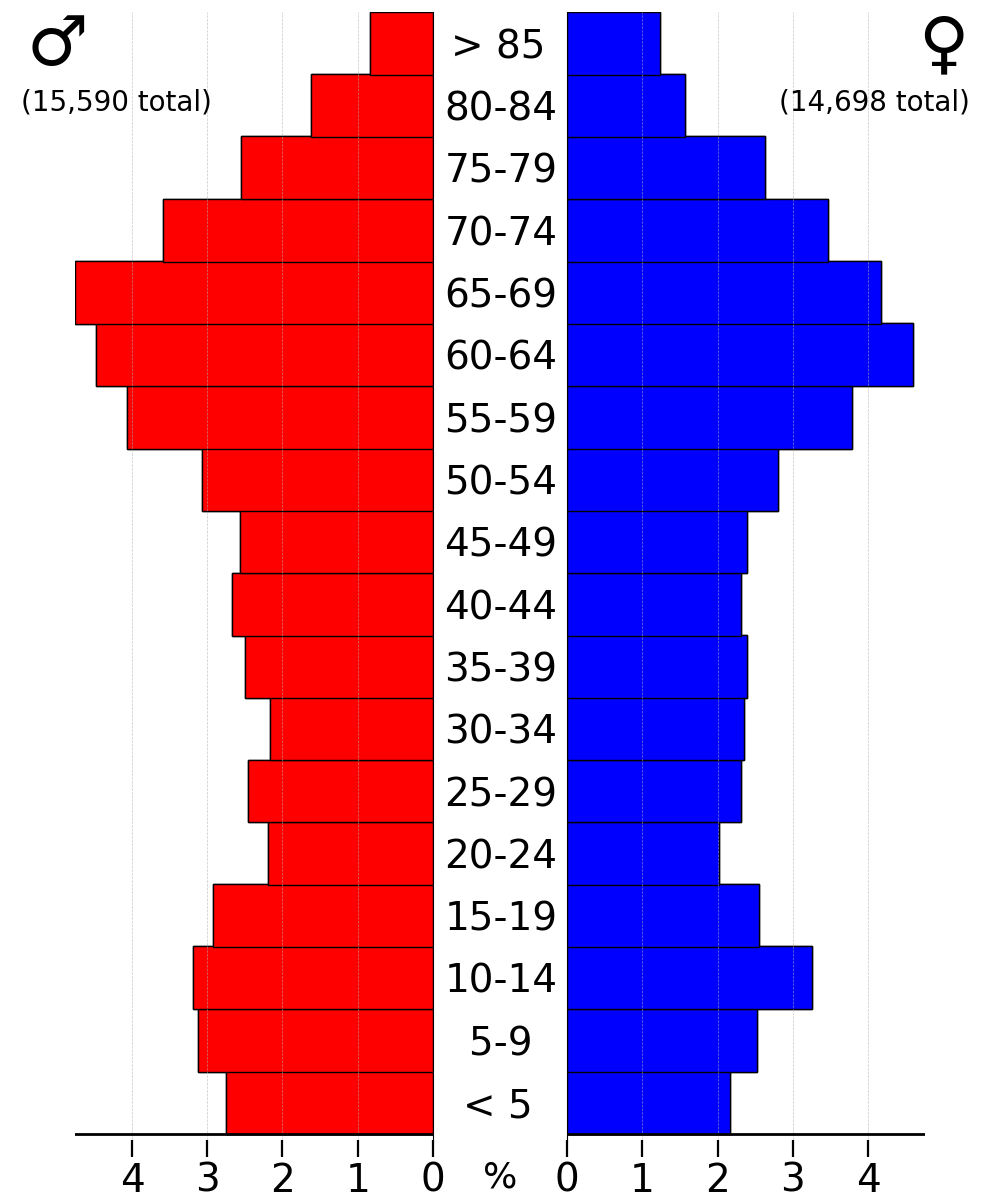
2022 US Census population pyramid for Cass County, from ACS 5-year estimates

As of the census of 2000, there were 27,150 people, 10,893 households, and 7,734 families in the county. The population density was 13.4 per square mile (5.2/km^{2}). There were 21,286 housing units at an average density of 10.5 per square mile (4.1/km^{2}). The racial makeup of the county was 86.52% White, 0.11% Black or African American, 11.45% Native American, 0.28% Asian, 0.02% Pacific Islander, 0.14% from other races, and 1.47% from two or more races. 0.81% of the population were Hispanic or Latino of any race. 28.2% were of German, 15.0% Norwegian, 7.3% Swedish, 6.1% Irish and 6.1% American ancestry.

There were 10,893 households, out of which 27.70% had children under the age of 18 living with them, 58.40% were married couples living together, 8.00% had a female householder with no husband present, and 29.00% were non-families. 25.00% of all households were made up of individuals, and 11.90% had someone living alone who was 65 years of age or older. The average household size was 2.45 and the average family size was 2.90.

The county population contained 25.00% under the age of 18, 6.10% from 18 to 24, 23.00% from 25 to 44, 27.90% from 45 to 64, and 18.00% who were 65 years of age or older. The median age was 42 years. For every 100 females there were 101.90 males. For every 100 females age 18 and over, there were 100.60 males.

The median income for a household in the county was $34,332, and the median income for a family was $40,156. Males had a median income of $30,097 versus $21,232 for females. The per capita income for the county was $17,189. About 9.50% of families and 13.60% of the population were below the poverty line, including 18.20% of those under age 18 and 13.30% of those age 65 or over.

== Communities ==
=== Cities ===
- Backus
- Bena
- Boy River
- Cass Lake
- Chickamaw Beach
- East Gull Lake
- Federal Dam
- Hackensack
- Lake Shore
- Longville
- Motley (partial)
- Pillager
- Pine River
- Remer
- Walker (county seat)

=== Census-designated place ===
- Whipholt

=== Unincorporated communities ===
- Ah-gwah-ching
- Brevik
- Bridgeman
- Casino
- Ellis
- Esterdy
- Graff
- Inguadona
- Leader
- Leech Lake
- Mae
- Mildred
- Onigum
- Oshawa
- Outing
- Pontoria
- Raboin
- Ryan Village
- Schley
- Sylvan
- Tobique
- Wabedo
- Wilkinson

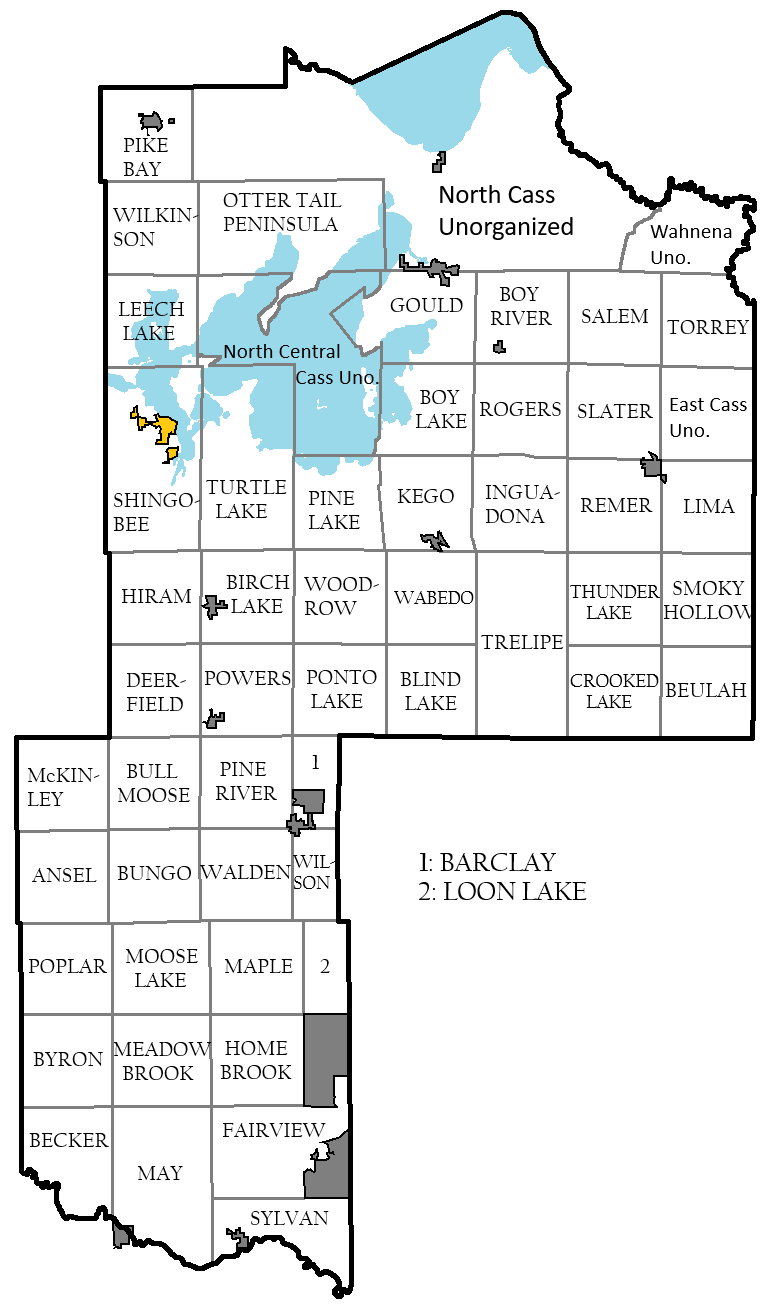
Townships and unorganized territories of Cass County

=== Townships ===
- Ansel Township
- Barclay Township
- Becker Township
- Beulah Township
- Birch Lake Township
- Blind Lake Township
- Boy Lake Township
- Boy River Township
- Bull Moose Township
- Bungo Township
- Byron Township
- Crooked Lake Township
- Deerfield Township
- Fairview Township
- Gould Township
- Hiram Township
- Home Brook Township
- Inguadona Township
- Kego Township
- Leech Lake Township
- Lima Township
- Loon Lake Township
- Maple Township
- May Township
- McKinley Township
- Meadow Brook Township
- Moose Lake Township
- Otter Tail Peninsula Township
- Pike Bay Township
- Pine Lake Township
- Pine River Township
- Ponto Lake Township
- Poplar Township
- Powers Township
- Remer Township
- Rogers Township
- Salem Township
- Shingobee Township
- Slater Township
- Smoky Hollow Township
- Sylvan Township
- Thunder Lake Township
- Torrey Township
- Trelipe Township
- Turtle Lake Township
- Wabedo Township
- Walden Township
- Wilkinson Township
- Wilson Township
- Woodrow Township

=== Unorganized territories ===
- Wahnena
- North Cass
- North Central Cass
- East Cass

== Government and politics ==
Cass County tends to vote Republican. As of 2024, the county has selected the Republican nominee in 83% of presidential elections since 1980.

United States presidential election results for Cass County, Minnesota
Year	Republican		Democratic		Third party(ies)	
Year	No.	%	No.	%	No.	%
1892	311	39.72%	233	29.76%	239	30.52%
1896	351	55.63%	271	42.95%	9	1.43%
1900	1,074	65.17%	518	31.43%	56	3.40%
1904	1,178	74.79%	222	14.10%	175	11.11%
1908	1,009	59.04%	461	26.97%	239	13.98%
1912	431	20.55%	565	26.94%	1,101	52.50%
1916	982	38.21%	1,260	49.03%	328	12.76%
1920	3,242	70.51%	710	15.44%	646	14.05%
1924	2,800	54.13%	270	5.22%	2,103	40.65%
1928	3,781	67.02%	1,747	30.96%	114	2.02%
1932	2,302	38.09%	3,494	57.82%	247	4.09%
1936	2,634	35.91%	4,440	60.54%	260	3.55%
1940	4,089	47.92%	4,392	51.47%	52	0.61%
1944	3,135	47.88%	3,377	51.58%	35	0.53%
1948	3,179	43.68%	3,933	54.04%	166	2.28%
1952	4,601	61.46%	2,818	37.64%	67	0.90%
1956	4,007	59.23%	2,748	40.62%	10	0.15%
1960	4,399	55.05%	3,578	44.78%	14	0.18%
1964	3,110	40.11%	4,635	59.78%	9	0.12%
1968	3,888	48.91%	3,569	44.89%	493	6.20%
1972	4,906	57.70%	3,347	39.36%	250	2.94%
1976	4,443	43.41%	5,424	53.00%	367	3.59%
1980	6,119	53.28%	4,717	41.07%	649	5.65%
1984	6,619	57.71%	4,773	41.61%	78	0.68%
1988	5,895	53.02%	5,127	46.11%	97	0.87%
1992	4,276	35.06%	4,901	40.18%	3,020	24.76%
1996	4,791	39.83%	5,437	45.20%	1,801	14.97%
2000	7,134	52.48%	5,534	40.71%	925	6.80%
2004	8,875	55.78%	6,835	42.96%	200	1.26%
2008	8,660	53.11%	7,276	44.62%	371	2.28%
2012	8,957	55.49%	6,858	42.49%	326	2.02%
2016	9,982	62.39%	4,949	30.93%	1,068	6.68%
2020	11,620	63.54%	6,342	34.68%	327	1.79%
2024	12,759	65.89%	6,300	32.54%	304	1.57%

County Board of Commissioners
Position	Name	District	Next Election
Commissioner	Neal Gaalswyk	District 1	2026
Commissioner	Robert Kangas	District 2	2024
Commissioner	Jeff Peterson	District 3	2024
Commissioner	Scott Bruns	District 4	2026
Commissioner	Rick Haaland	District 5	2024

State Legislature (2018-2020)
Position	Name	Affiliation	District
Senate	Justin Eichorn	Republican	District 5
House of Representatives	John Persell	Democrat	District 5A
House of Representatives	Sandy Layman	Republican	District 5B

U.S Congress (2018-2020)
Position	Name	Affiliation	District
House of Representatives	Pete Stauber	Republican	8th
Senate	Amy Klobuchar	Democrat	N/A
Senate	Tina Smith	Democrat	N/A

== Education ==
School districts include:

- Brainerd Public Schools
- Cass Lake-Bena Public Schools
- Deer River Public School District
- Pequot Lakes Public Schools
- Pillager Public School District
- Pine River-Backus Public School District
- Northland Community Schools
- Sebeka Public School District
- Staples-Motley School District
- Walker-Hackensack-Akeley School District

Bug-O-Nay-Ge-Shig School, a tribal school affiliated with the Bureau of Indian Education, is in the county.

== See also ==
- National Register of Historic Places listings in Cass County, Minnesota
- Woman Lake
