= Fifty Lakes, Minnesota =

City in Minnesota, United States

Fifty Lakes
- City
- Location of Fifty Lakes within Crow Wing County, Minnesota
- Coordinates: 46°45′42″N 94°05′23″W
- Country: United States
- State: Minnesota
- County: Crow Wing

Area
  - Total: 33.56 sq mi (86.92 km^{2})
  - Land: 29.32 sq mi (75.93 km^{2})
  - Water: 4.24 sq mi (10.99 km^{2})
- Elevation: 1,362 ft (415 m)

Population (2020)
  - Total: 443
  - Density: 15.1/sq mi (5.83/km^{2})
- Time zone: UTC-6 (Central (CST))
  - Summer (DST): UTC-5 (CDT)
- ZIP code: 56448
- Area code: 218
- FIPS code: 27-21032
- GNIS feature ID: 2394764

Fifty Lakes is a city in Crow Wing County, Minnesota, United States. As of the 2020 census, Fifty Lakes had a population of 443. It is part of the Brainerd Micropolitan Statistical Area.

== History ==
Fifty Lakes was incorporated in May 1949. Its post office began in 1926.

== Geography ==
According to the United States Census Bureau, the city has a total area of 33.16 square miles (85.88 km^{2}), of which 29.20 square miles (75.63 km^{2}) is land and 3.96 square miles (10.26 km^{2}) is water. It is along County Roads 1, 3, and 136.

== Demographics ==
Historical population
Census	Pop.	Note	%±
1960	143		—
1970	143		0.0%
1980	263		83.9%
1990	299		13.7%
2000	392		31.1%
2010	387		−1.3%
2020	443		14.5%
U.S. Decennial Census

=== 2010 census ===
As of the census of 2010, there were 387 people, 173 households, and 129 families living in the city. The population density was 13.3 inhabitants per square mile (5.1/km^{2}). There were 585 housing units at an average density of 20.0 per square mile (7.7/km^{2}). The racial makeup of the city was 99.2% White and 0.8% from other races. Hispanic or Latino of any race were 0.8% of the population.

There were 173 households, of which 20.2% had children under the age of 18 living with them, 65.9% were married couples living together, 3.5% had a female householder with no husband present, 5.2% had a male householder with no wife present, and 25.4% were non-families. 19.1% of all households were made up of individuals, and 11% had someone living alone who was 65 years of age or older. The average household size was 2.24 and the average family size was 2.53.

The median age in the city was 56.4 years. 17.6% of residents were under the age of 18; 1.7% were between the ages of 18 and 24; 13.1% were from 25 to 44; 32.6% were from 45 to 64; and 34.9% were 65 years of age or older. The gender makeup of the city was 51.2% male and 48.8% female.

=== 2000 census ===
As of the census of 2000, there were 392 people, 194 households, and 135 families living in the city. The population density was 13.5 inhabitants per square mile (5.2/km^{2}). There were 515 housing units at an average density of 17.7 per square mile (6.8/km^{2}). The racial makeup of the city was 99.74% White and 0.26% African American. Hispanic or Latino of any race were 0.77% of the population.

There were 194 households, out of which 13.4% had children under the age of 18 living with them, 64.9% were married couples living together, 2.1% had a female householder with no husband present, and 30.4% were non-families. 26.8% of all households were made up of individuals, and 12.4% had someone living alone who was 65 years of age or older. The average household size was 2.02 and the average family size was 2.39.

In the city, the population was spread out, with 11.5% under the age of 18, 4.6% from 18 to 24, 16.1% from 25 to 44, 40.1% from 45 to 64, and 27.8% who were 65 years of age or older. The median age was 57 years. For every 100 females, there were 113.0 males. For every 100 females age 18 and over, there were 107.8 males.

The median income for a household in the city was $34,773, and the median income for a family was $37,500. Males had a median income of $48,125 versus $23,000 for females. The per capita income for the city was $23,575. About 2.9% of families and 3.9% of the population were below the poverty line, including none of those under age 18 and 4.3% of those age 65 or over.
