= Mission Township, Crow Wing County, Minnesota =

Township in Minnesota, United States

Mission Township
- Township
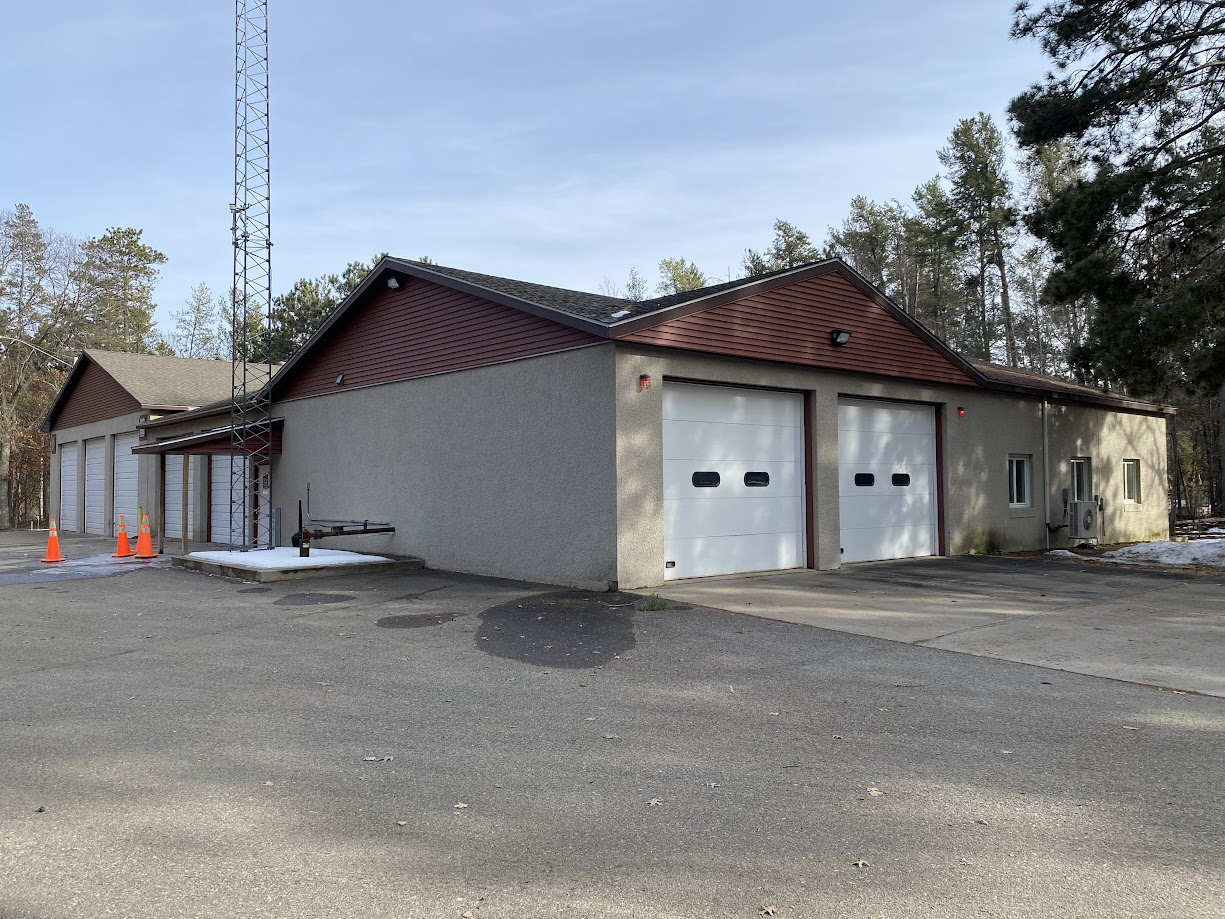
- Town hall of Mission Township

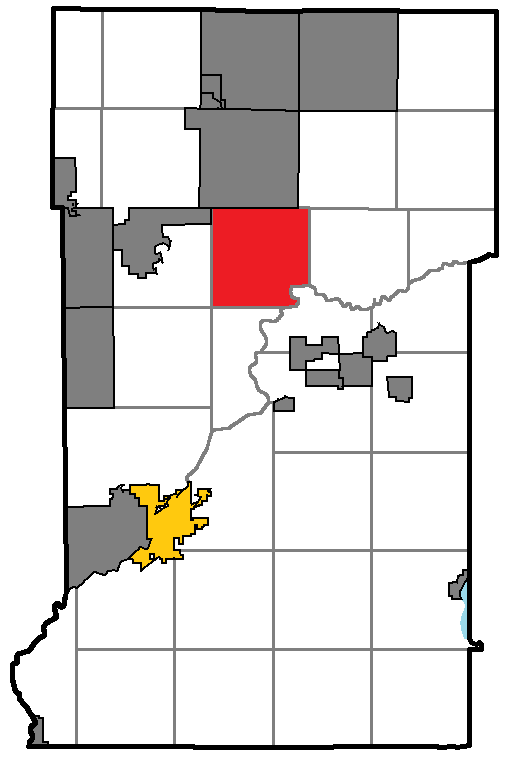
- Location of Mission Township, within Crow Wing County, Minnesota
- Coordinates: 46°35′16″N 94°5′25″W
- Country: United States
- State: Minnesota
- County: Crow Wing

Area
  - Total: 34.7 sq mi (89.8 km^{2})
  - Land: 29.6 sq mi (76.6 km^{2})
  - Water: 5.1 sq mi (13.2 km^{2})
- Elevation: 1,211 ft (369 m)

Population (2020)
  - Total: 796
  - Density: 26.9/sq mi (10.4/km^{2})
- Time zone: UTC-6 (Central (CST))
  - Summer (DST): UTC-5 (CDT)
- FIPS code: 27-43468
- GNIS feature ID: 0665001
- Website: https://missiontownship.org/

Mission Township is a township in Crow Wing County, Minnesota, United States. The population was 796 at the 2020 census.

Mission Township was named from the Indian mission it once contained.

== Geography ==
According to the United States Census Bureau, the township has a total area of 34.7 square miles (89.8 km^{2}), of which 29.6 square miles (76.6 km^{2}) is land and 5.1 square miles (13.2 km^{2}) (14.68%) is water.

== Demographics ==
A Quiet Place To Be road sign

As of the census of 2000, there were 733 people, 323 households, and 225 families residing in the township. The population density was 24.8 people per square mile (9.6/km^{2}). There were 871 housing units at an average density of 29.5 per square mile (11.4/km^{2}). The racial makeup of the township was 98.77% White, 0.55% African American, 0.27% Native American, and 0.41% from two or more races.

There were 323 households, out of which 20.4% had children under the age of 18 living with them, 64.4% were married couples living together, 2.2% had a female householder with no husband present, and 30.3% were non-families. 25.7% of all households were made up of individuals, and 10.5% had someone living alone who was 65 years of age or older. The average household size was 2.27 and the average family size was 2.72.

In the township the population was spread out, with 18.1% under the age of 18, 5.5% from 18 to 24, 25.0% from 25 to 44, 30.2% from 45 to 64, and 21.3% who were 65 years of age or older. The median age was 46 years. For every 100 females, there were 108.8 males. For every 100 females age 18 and over, there were 111.3 males.

The median income for a household in the township was $41,750, and the median income for a family was $46,932. Males had a median income of $37,500 versus $21,406 for females. The per capita income for the township was $26,503. About 4.7% of families and 3.8% of the population were below the poverty line, including 9.8% of those under age 18 and 3.1% of those age 65 or over.
