= Pine River, Minnesota =

City in Minnesota, United States

Pine River
- City
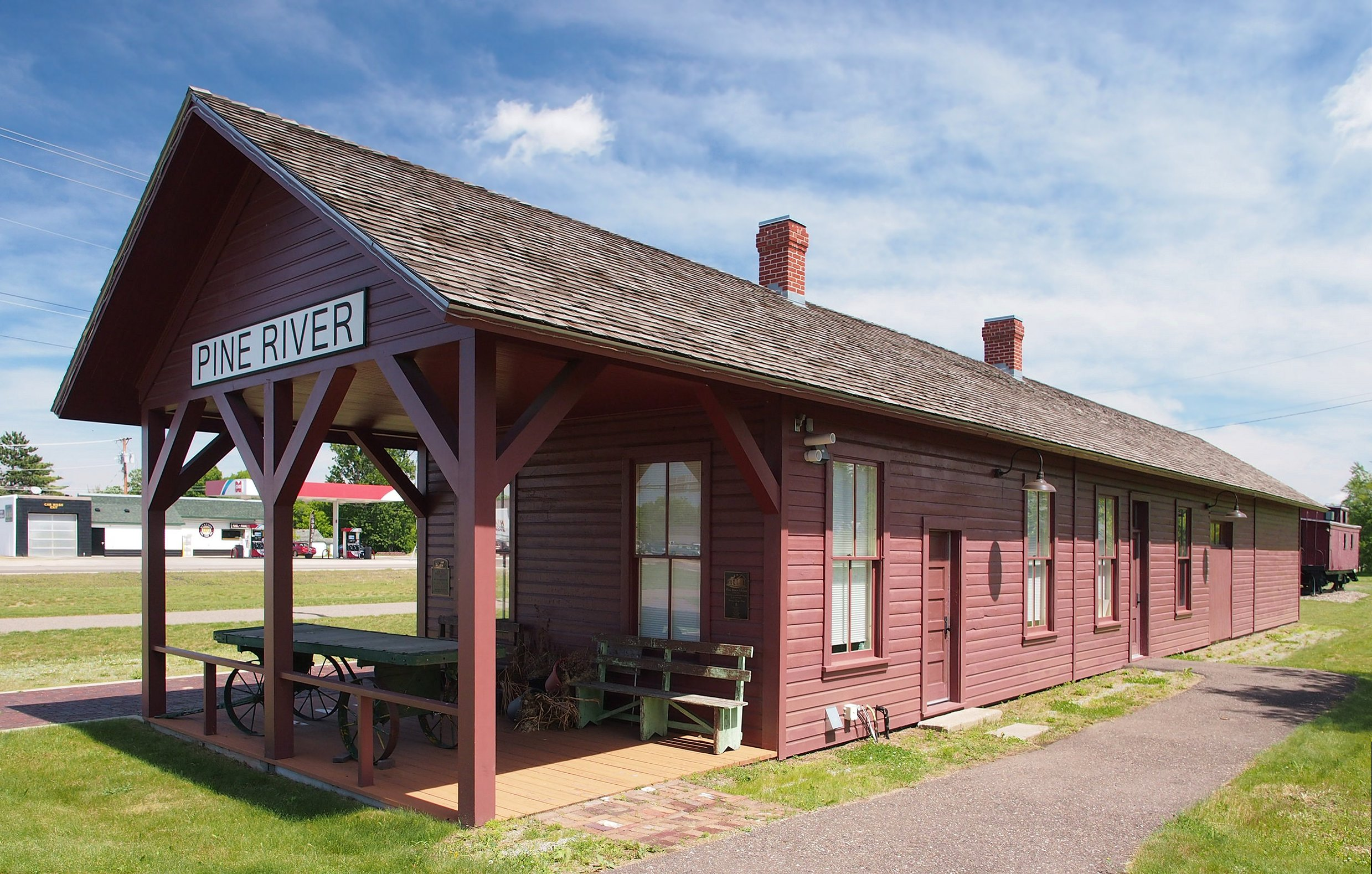
- Pine River Depot is listed on the National Register of Historic Places

- Location of Pine River within Cass County, Minnesota
- Coordinates: 46°43′21″N 94°23′50″W
- Country: United States
- State: Minnesota
- County: Cass
- Incorporated: 1901

Area
  - Total: 1.22 sq mi (3.17 km^{2})
  - Land: 1.20 sq mi (3.10 km^{2})
  - Water: 0.031 sq mi (0.08 km^{2})
- Elevation: 1,283 ft (391 m)

Population (2020)
  - Total: 911
  - Estimate (2022): 931
  - Density: 762.0/sq mi (294.21/km^{2})
- Time zone: UTC-6 (Central (CST))
  - Summer (DST): UTC-5 (CDT)
- ZIP code: 56474
- Area code: 218
- FIPS code: 27-51280
- GNIS feature ID: 2396210
- Website: cityofpineriver.org

Pine River is a city in Cass County, Minnesota, United States. The population was 911 at the 2020 census. It is part of the Brainerd Micropolitan Statistical Area.

== History ==
Pine River was incorporated in 1901. Its post office began in 1877.

== Geography ==
According to the United States Census Bureau, the city has a total area of 1.20 square miles (3.11 km^{2}), of which 1.16 square miles (3.00 km^{2}) is land and 0.04 square miles (0.10 km^{2}) is water.

Minnesota State Highways 84 and 371 are two of the main routes in the community. Although, there are many county roads interconnecting Pine River to the surrounding communities. Pine River is located 30 miles north-northwest of Brainerd along Highway 371.

== Demographics ==
Historical population
Census	Pop.	Note	%±
1910	329		—
1920	442		34.3%
1930	422		−4.5%
1940	574		36.0%
1950	835		45.5%
1960	775		−7.2%
1970	803		3.6%
1980	881		9.7%
1990	871		−1.1%
2000	928		6.5%
2010	944		1.7%
2020	911		−3.5%
2022 (est.)	931		2.2%
U.S. Decennial Census; 2020 Census

=== 2010 census ===
As of the census of 2010, there were 944 people, 417 households, and 199 families living in the city. The population density was 813.8 inhabitants per square mile (314.2/km^{2}). There were 457 housing units at an average density of 394.0 per square mile (152.1/km^{2}). The racial makeup of the city was 96.5% White, 0.1% African American, 1.2% Native American, 0.4% Asian, 0.1% from other races, and 1.7% from two or more races. Hispanic or Latino of any race were 1.5% of the population.

There were 417 households, of which 29.3% had children under the age of 18 living with them, 27.8% were married couples living together, 14.6% had a female householder with no husband present, 5.3% had a male householder with no wife present, and 52.3% were non-families. 47.7% of all households were made up of individuals, and 27.6% had someone living alone who was 65 years of age or older. The average household size was 2.06 and the average family size was 2.87.

The median age in the city was 43.7 years. 23.9% of residents were under the age of 18; 6.3% were between the ages of 18 and 24; 20.7% were from 25 to 44; 21.6% were from 45 to 64; and 27.3% were 65 years of age or older. The gender makeup of the city was 44.1% male and 55.9% female.

=== 2000 census ===
As of the census of 2000, there were 928 people, 438 households, and 216 families living in the city. The population density was 834.6 inhabitants per square mile (322.2/km^{2}). There were 464 housing units at an average density of 417.3 per square mile (161.1/km^{2}). The racial makeup of the city was 96.77% White, 0.75% African American, 1.08% Native American, 0.22% Asian, 0.22% from other races, and 0.97% from two or more races. Hispanic or Latino of any race were 0.75% of the population.

There were 438 households, out of which 25.8% had children under the age of 18 living with them, 37.4% were married couples living together, 9.8% had a female householder with no husband present, and 50.5% were non-families. 48.9% of all households were made up of individuals, and 35.6% had someone living alone who was 65 years of age or older. The average household size was 2.06 and the average family size was 3.03.

In the city, the population was spread out, with 25.9% under the age of 18, 5.5% from 18 to 24, 21.7% from 25 to 44, 17.7% from 45 to 64, and 29.3% who were 65 years of age or older. The median age was 43 years. For every 100 females, there were 78.5 males. For every 100 females age 18 and over, there were 71.1 males.

The median income for a household in the city was $23,480, and the median income for a family was $36,250. Males had a median income of $25,714 versus $19,464 for females. The per capita income for the city was $14,571. About 10.1% of families and 16.7% of the population were below the poverty line, including 20.7% of those under age 18 and 22.1% of those age 65 or over.

== Education ==
Public education is provided by the Pine River-Backus School District.

== Media ==
=== AM radio ===
- 820 WBKK (under construction)
- 870 KPRM Classic Country News/Talk
- 1210 New AM (FCC application)
- 1070 KSKK Country
- 1570 KAKK Oldies

== Notable person ==
- Terry Baker - professional football player
