= Chickamaw Beach, Minnesota =

City in Minnesota, United States

Chickamaw Beach
- City
- Location of Chickamaw Beach within Cass County, Minnesota
- Coordinates: 46°44′43″N 94°23′04″W
- Country: United States
- State: Minnesota
- County: Cass

Area
  - Total: 2.64 sq mi (6.85 km^{2})
  - Land: 2.25 sq mi (5.84 km^{2})
  - Water: 0.39 sq mi (1.01 km^{2})
- Elevation: 1,309 ft (399 m)

Population (2020)
  - Total: 128
  - Density: 56.8/sq mi (21.93/km^{2})
- Time zone: UTC-6 (Central (CST))
  - Summer (DST): UTC-5 (CDT)
- FIPS code: 27-11296
- GNIS feature ID: 2393513
- Website: https://cityofchickamawbeach.org/

Chickamaw Beach is a city in Cass County, Minnesota, United States. The population was 128 at the 2020 census. It is part of the Brainerd Micropolitan Statistical Area.

== History ==
Chickamaw Beach was incorporated in 1950.

== Geography ==
According to the United States Census Bureau, the city has a total area of 2.61 square miles (6.76 km^{2}), of which, 2.22 square miles (5.75 km^{2}) is land and 0.39 square miles (1.01 km^{2}) is water.

Minnesota State Highway 84 serves as a main route in the community. Minnesota State Highway 371 is nearby.

== Demographics ==
Historical population
Census	Pop.	Note	%±
1960	76		—
1970	87		14.5%
1980	124		42.5%
1990	132		6.5%
2000	148		12.1%
2010	114		−23.0%
2020	128		12.3%
U.S. Decennial Census

=== 2010 census ===
As of the census of 2010, there were 114 people, 58 households, and 35 families living in the city. The population density was 51.4 inhabitants per square mile (19.8/km^{2}). There were 111 housing units at an average density of 50.0 per square mile (19.3/km^{2}). The racial makeup of the city was 100.0% White. Hispanic or Latino of any race were 1.8% of the population.

There were 58 households, of which 12.1% had children under the age of 18 living with them, 58.6% were married couples living together, 1.7% had a female householder with no husband present, and 39.7% were non-families. 27.6% of all households were made up of individuals, and 10.3% had someone living alone who was 65 years of age or older. The average household size was 1.97 and the average family size was 2.40.

The median age in the city was 57.5 years. 10.5% of residents were under the age of 18; 0.9% were between the ages of 18 and 24; 15.8% were from 25 to 44; 43.8% were from 45 to 64; and 28.9% were 65 years of age or older. The gender makeup of the city was 50.9% male and 49.1% female.

=== 2000 census ===
As of the census of 2000, there were 148 people, 63 households, and 45 families living in the city. The population density was 67.7 inhabitants per square mile (26.1/km^{2}). There were 110 housing units at an average density of 50.3 per square mile (19.4/km^{2}). The racial makeup of the city was 100.00% White.

There were 63 households, out of which 23.8% had children under the age of 18 living with them, 71.4% were married couples living together, 1.6% had a female householder with no husband present, and 27.0% were non-families. 22.2% of all households were made up of individuals, and 11.1% had someone living alone who was 65 years of age or older. The average household size was 2.35 and the average family size was 2.78.

In the city, the population was spread out, with 18.2% under the age of 18, 4.7% from 18 to 24, 14.2% from 25 to 44, 39.9% from 45 to 64, and 23.0% who were 65 years of age or older. The median age was 50 years. For every 100 females, there were 102.7 males. For every 100 females age 18 and over, there were 98.4 males.

The median income for a household in the city was $28,750, and the median income for a family was $43,750. Males had a median income of $27,250 versus $16,071 for females. The per capita income for the city was $20,223. There were 2.6% of families and 5.4% of the population living below the poverty line, including no under eighteens and 16.7% of those over 64.
