= Leech Lake Township, Cass County, Minnesota =

Leech Lake Township, Minnesota
- Township
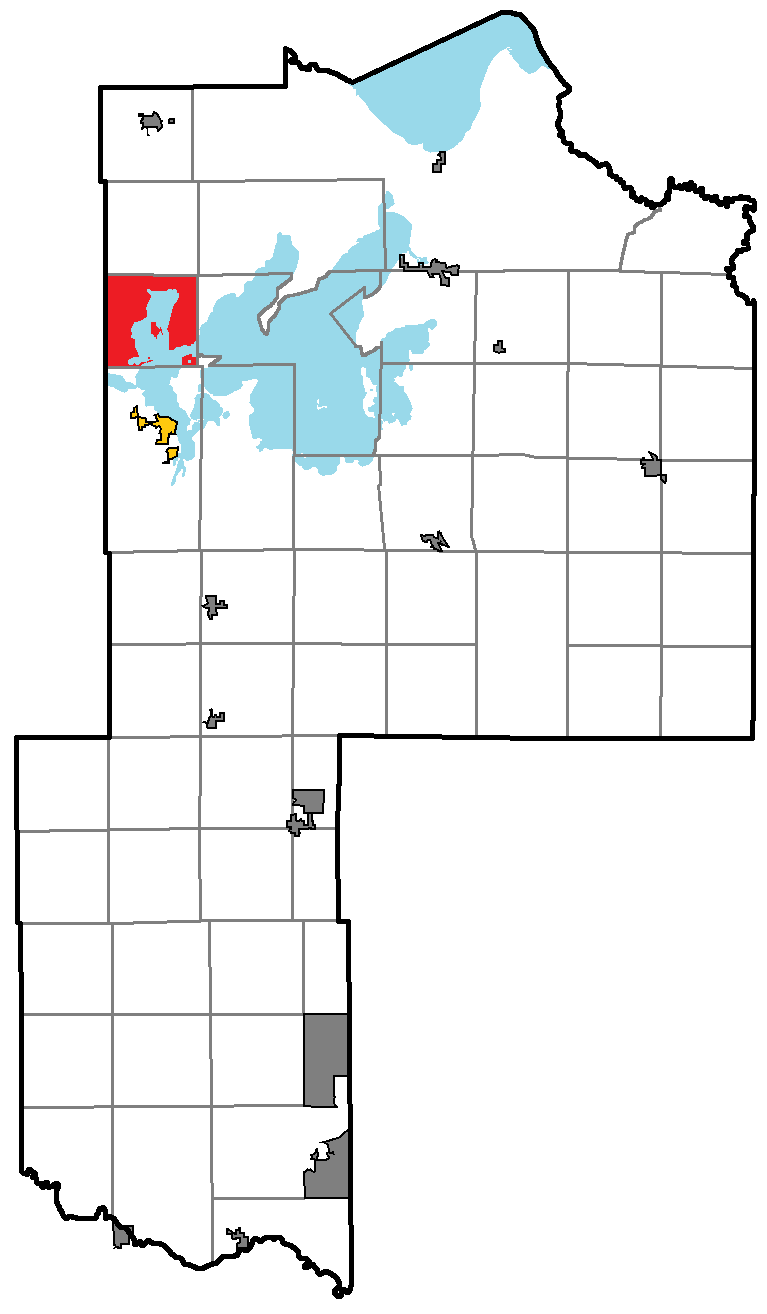
- Location of Leech Lake Township, within Cass County, Minnesota
- Coordinates: 47°10′56″N 94°35′48″W
- Country: United States
- State: Minnesota
- County: Cass

Area
  - Total: 35.3 sq mi (91.3 km^{2})
  - Land: 23.2 sq mi (60.0 km^{2})
  - Water: 12.1 sq mi (31.3 km^{2})
- Elevation: 1,299 ft (396 m)

Population (2020)
  - Total: 437
  - Density: 18.9/sq mi (7.28/km^{2})
- Time zone: UTC-6 (Central (CST))
  - Summer (DST): UTC-5 (CDT)
- ZIP code: 56484
- Area code: 218
- FIPS code: 27-36224
- GNIS feature ID: 0664746

Leech Lake Township is a township in Cass County, Minnesota, United States. The population was 437 at the 2020 census. This township took its name from Leech Lake.

== Geography ==
According to the United States Census Bureau, the township has a total area of 35.3 square miles (91 km^{2}), of which 23.2 square miles (60 km^{2}) is land and 12.1 square miles (31 km^{2}) (34.26%) is water.

=== Climate ===
Leech Lake has a humid continental climate (Köppen Dfb), bordering on a dry-winter humid continental climate (Köppen Dwb). Leech Lake previously held the record for the lowest temperature recorded in Minnesota, at −59 °F (−51 °C) on 9 February 1899, until it was broken in Tower with a new record of −60 °F (−51.1 °C).

Climate data for Leech Lake, Minnesota, 1991–2020 normals, 1891-2023 extremes: 1302ft (397m)
Month	Jan	Feb	Mar	Apr	May	Jun	Jul	Aug	Sep	Oct	Nov	Dec	Year
Record high °F (°C)	53 (12)	61 (16)	81 (27)	94 (34)	102 (39)	98 (37)	104 (40)	100 (38)	101 (38)	90 (32)	72 (22)	58 (14)	104 (40)
Mean maximum °F (°C)	38.9 (3.8)	44.8 (7.1)	59.3 (15.2)	73.1 (22.8)	84.6 (29.2)	88.5 (31.4)	89.6 (32.0)	89.1 (31.7)	84.1 (28.9)	76.5 (24.7)	56.0 (13.3)	41.1 (5.1)	91.9 (33.3)
Mean daily maximum °F (°C)	17.6 (−8.0)	23.8 (−4.6)	37.4 (3.0)	51.8 (11.0)	66.1 (18.9)	75.4 (24.1)	79.8 (26.6)	78.2 (25.7)	69.3 (20.7)	54.1 (12.3)	36.4 (2.4)	23.1 (−4.9)	51.1 (10.6)
Daily mean °F (°C)	7.7 (−13.5)	12.5 (−10.8)	26.2 (−3.2)	40.6 (4.8)	54.4 (12.4)	64.4 (18.0)	69.1 (20.6)	67.1 (19.5)	58.2 (14.6)	44.5 (6.9)	28.9 (−1.7)	15.0 (−9.4)	40.7 (4.9)
Mean daily minimum °F (°C)	−2.3 (−19.1)	1.2 (−17.1)	15.1 (−9.4)	29.4 (−1.4)	42.7 (5.9)	53.5 (11.9)	58.3 (14.6)	55.9 (13.3)	47.1 (8.4)	35.0 (1.7)	21.3 (−5.9)	6.8 (−14.0)	30.3 (−0.9)
Mean minimum °F (°C)	−26.5 (−32.5)	−22.6 (−30.3)	−10.9 (−23.8)	14.4 (−9.8)	29.4 (−1.4)	40.5 (4.7)	47.6 (8.7)	44.4 (6.9)	32.6 (0.3)	21.8 (−5.7)	2.4 (−16.4)	−17.2 (−27.3)	−29.0 (−33.9)
Record low °F (°C)	−52 (−47)	−59 (−51)	−48 (−44)	−13 (−25)	12 (−11)	24 (−4)	35 (2)	27 (−3)	16 (−9)	1 (−17)	−37 (−38)	−51 (−46)	−59 (−51)
Average precipitation inches (mm)	0.68 (17)	0.68 (17)	1.11 (28)	1.86 (47)	2.91 (74)	3.82 (97)	4.37 (111)	3.20 (81)	3.13 (80)	2.51 (64)	1.22 (31)	1.09 (28)	26.58 (675)
Average snowfall inches (cm)	9.30 (23.6)	7.20 (18.3)	6.80 (17.3)	5.90 (15.0)	0.00 (0.00)	0.00 (0.00)	0.00 (0.00)	0.00 (0.00)	0.00 (0.00)	1.10 (2.8)	6.80 (17.3)	11.10 (28.2)	48.2 (122.5)
Average precipitation days (≥ 0.01 in)	6.0	5.1	6.0	6.6	11.7	12.8	12.0	9.9	10.5	9.6	6.5	6.3	103
Average snowy days (≥ 0.1 in)	6.1	4.7	3.7	2.0	0.0	0.0	0.0	0.0	0.0	0.9	3.7	6.4	27.5
Source 1: NOAA
Source 2: XMACIS2 (temp records & monthly max/mins)

== Demographics ==
As of the census of 2000, there were 384 people, 155 households, and 119 families residing in the township. The population density was 16.6 inhabitants per square mile (6.4/km^{2}). There were 285 housing units at an average density of 12.3 per square mile (4.7/km^{2}). The racial makeup of the township was 77.60% White, 21.35% Native American, 0.26% Asian, 0.52% from other races, and 0.26% from two or more races. Hispanic or Latino of any race were 1.30% of the population.

There were 155 households, out of which 25.8% had children under the age of 18 living with them, 64.5% were married couples living together, 6.5% had a female householder with no husband present, and 22.6% were non-families. 18.1% of all households were made up of individuals, and 8.4% had someone living alone who was 65 years of age or older. The average household size was 2.48 and the average family size was 2.74.

In the township the population was spread out, with 21.9% under the age of 18, 4.7% from 18 to 24, 22.1% from 25 to 44, 35.2% from 45 to 64, and 16.1% who were 65 years of age or older. The median age was 46 years. For every 100 females, there were 114.5 males. For every 100 females age 18 and over, there were 106.9 males.

The median income for a household in the township was $38,125, and the median income for a family was $42,083. Males had a median income of $40,469 versus $18,375 for females. The per capita income for the township was $17,112. About 13.3% of families and 14.4% of the population were below the poverty line, including 18.5% of those under age 18 and 24.4% of those age 65 or over.
