= Jenkins Township, Crow Wing County, Minnesota =

Township in Minnesota, United States

Jenkins Township
- Township
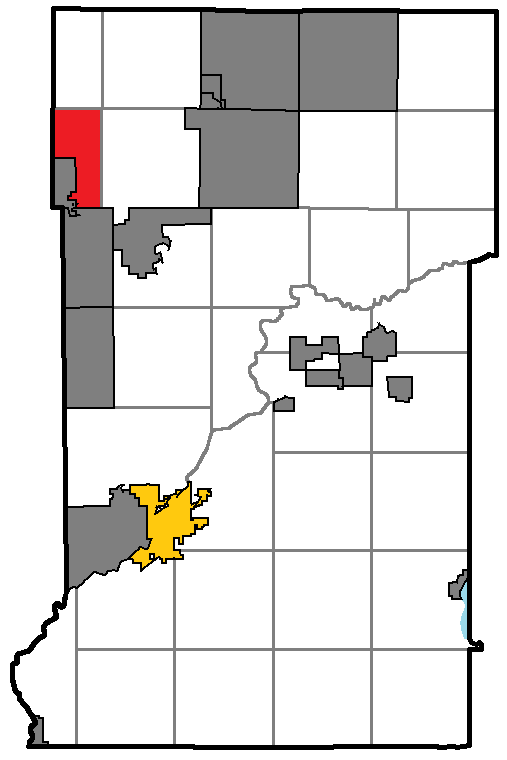
- Location of Jenkins Township, within Crow Wing County, Minnesota
- Coordinates: 46°40′21″N 94°17′48″W
- Country: United States
- State: Minnesota
- County: Crow Wing

Area
  - Total: 13.9 sq mi (36.1 km^{2})
  - Land: 11.9 sq mi (30.7 km^{2})
  - Water: 2.1 sq mi (5.4 km^{2})
- Elevation: 1,250 ft (380 m)

Population (2020)
  - Total: 397
  - Density: 33.5/sq mi (12.9/km^{2})
- Time zone: UTC-6 (Central (CST))
  - Summer (DST): UTC-5 (CDT)
- ZIP codes: 56456, 56472
- Area code: 218
- FIPS code: 27-31850
- GNIS feature ID: 0664580

Jenkins Township is a township in Crow Wing County, Minnesota, United States. The population was 397 at the 2020 census.

The township was named for George W. Jenkins, the founder of the city of Jenkins.

== Geography ==
According to the United States Census Bureau, the township has a total area of 13.9 square miles (36 km^{2}), of which 11.8 square miles (31 km^{2}) is land and 2.1 square miles (5.4 km^{2}) (15.00%) is water.

== Demographics ==
As of the census of 2000, there were 425 people, 176 households, and 139 families residing in the township. The population density was 35.9 inhabitants per square mile (13.9/km^{2}). There were 378 housing units at an average density of 31.9 per square mile (12.3/km^{2}). The racial makeup of the township was 99.76% White, and 0.24% from two or more races. Hispanic or Latino of any race were 0.71% of the population.

There were 176 households, out of which 24.4% had children under the age of 18 living with them, 73.9% were married couples living together, 5.1% had a female householder with no husband present, and 21.0% were non-families. 16.5% of all households were made up of individuals, and 9.7% had someone living alone who was 65 years of age or older. The average household size was 2.41 and the average family size was 2.65.

In the township the population was spread out, with 21.6% under the age of 18, 4.0% from 18 to 24, 21.4% from 25 to 44, 28.9% from 45 to 64, and 24.0% who were 65 years of age or older. The median age was 47 years. For every 100 females, there were 88.9 males. For every 100 females age 18 and over, there were 91.4 males.

The median income for a household in the township was $40,208, and the median income for a family was $40,417. Males had a median income of $31,250 versus $23,750 for females. The per capita income for the township was $18,498. About 9.6% of families and 10.3% of the population were below the poverty line, including 13.7% of those under age 18 and 9.0% of those age 65 or over.
