= Soo Line Depot =

Soo Line Depot may refer to the following train stations used by the Soo Line Railroad:

== Illinois ==
- Antioch station (Illinois)
- Grand Central Station (Chicago), major passenger terminal in Chicago where the Soo Line was one of the primary tenants
- Grayslake station (Soo Line)
- Lake Villa station

== Minnesota ==
- Crosby station (Minnesota), listed on the National Register of Historic Places listings in Crow Wing County
- Moose Lake station, listed on the National Register of Historic Places listings in Carlton County
- Remer station, listed on the National Register of Historic Places listings in Cass County, Minnesota
- Thief River Falls station, listed on the National Register of Historic Places listings in Pennington County

== Montana ==
- Outlook station (Montana), also known as Soo Line Depot, listed on the National Register of Historic Places listings in Sheridan County

== North Dakota ==
- Minot station (Soo Line), housing the Old Soo Depot Transportation Museum
- Wilton station (North Dakota), also known as Soo Line Depot

== South Dakota ==
- Pollock station, listed on the National Register of Historic Places listings in Campbell County

== Wisconsin ==
- Frederic Depot, listed on the National Register of Historic Places listings in Polk County
- Osceola station (Wisconsin), listed on the National Register of Historic Places listings in Polk County
- Ashland station (Soo Line), listed on the National Register of Historic Places listings in Ashland County, Wisconsin
- Burlington station (Wisconsin)
- New Richmond station (Wisconsin), listed on the National Register of Historic Places listings in St. Croix County
- Soo Line Depot, or Waupaca Railroad Depot, Waupaca, Wisconsin

== See also ==
- Minneapolis, St. Paul and Sault Ste. Marie Depot (disambiguation)
