= Soo Line =

Soo Line may refer to:

- Minneapolis, St. Paul and Sault Ste. Marie Railroad, a major railroad west of Minneapolis–Saint Paul; merged into the Soo Line Railroad in 1961
- Minneapolis, St. Paul and Sault Ste. Marie Depot (disambiguation), various train stations
- Soo Line Building, a 19-story residential highrise in Minneapolis, Minnesota
- Soo Line Corporation, a corporation that manages the Soo Line Railroad
- Soo Line Depot (disambiguation), various train stations
- Soo Line locomotives, a list page
- Soo Line Railroad, a Canadian Pacific Railway subsidiary
