= Minneapolis, St. Paul and Sault Ste. Marie Depot =

Two former railroad stations are listed on the National Register of Historic Places as Minneapolis, St. Paul and Sault Ste. Marie Depot:

- Moose Lake station
- Thief River Falls station

== See also ==
- Minneapolis, St. Paul and Sault Ste. Marie Railroad
- Soo Line Depot (disambiguation)
