= New Richmond station =

New Richmond station may refer to:

- Soo Line Depot (New Richmond, Wisconsin), United States
- New Richmond station (Quebec), Canada
