= Remer station =

Historic depot in Remer, Minnesota

Remer
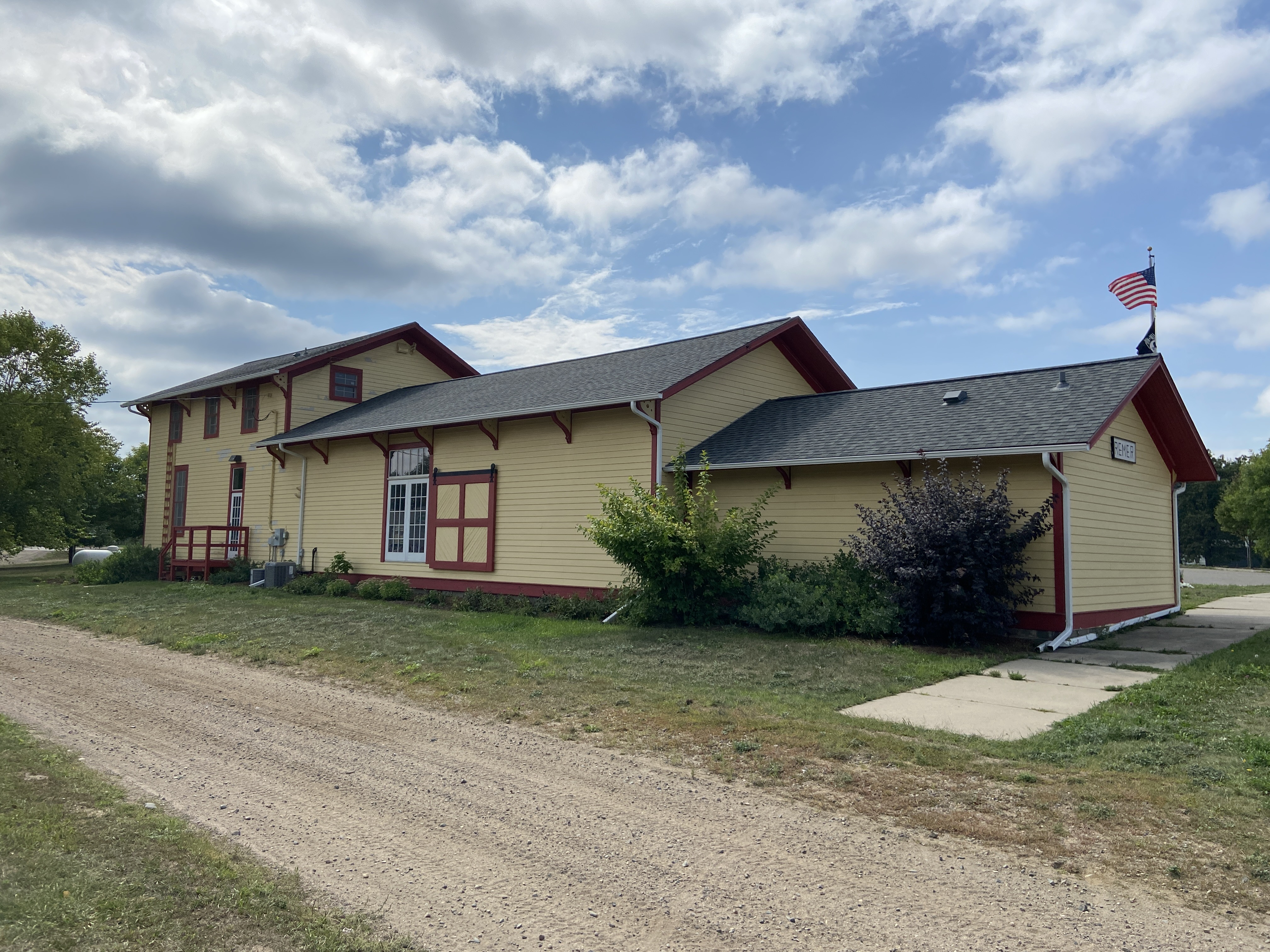
- Remer station in 2011

General information
- Location: 100 W Main St W, Remer, Minnesota 56672
- Coordinates: 47°03′25″N 93°55′06″W
- System: Former Soo Line passenger rail station

History
- Opened: circa 1910
- Closed: May 16, 1959

Services
| Preceding station | Soo Line | Following station |
|---|---|---|
| Boy River toward Plummer | Plummer – Moose Lake | Shovel Lake toward Moose Lake |
- Soo Line Depot
- U.S. National Register of Historic Places
- Location within Minnesota Location within the United States
- Location: Off Main St., Remer, Minnesota
- Coordinates: 47°03′25″N 93°55′06″W
- Area: less than one acre
- Built: circa 1910
- NRHP reference No.: 80001993
- Added to NRHP: May 23, 1980
Location

Remer station in Remer, Minnesota, United States, is a depot built around 1910 by the Soo Line Railroad. It was listed on the National Register of Historic Places in 1980 as the Soo Line Depot.

Passenger train service to the Remer station ended on May 16, 1959, when trains 64 and 65 were discontinued between Duluth and Thief River Falls.

The depot now serves as a library, while the former rail right of way is a trail.
