= Remer, Minnesota =

City in Minnesota, United States

Remer
- City
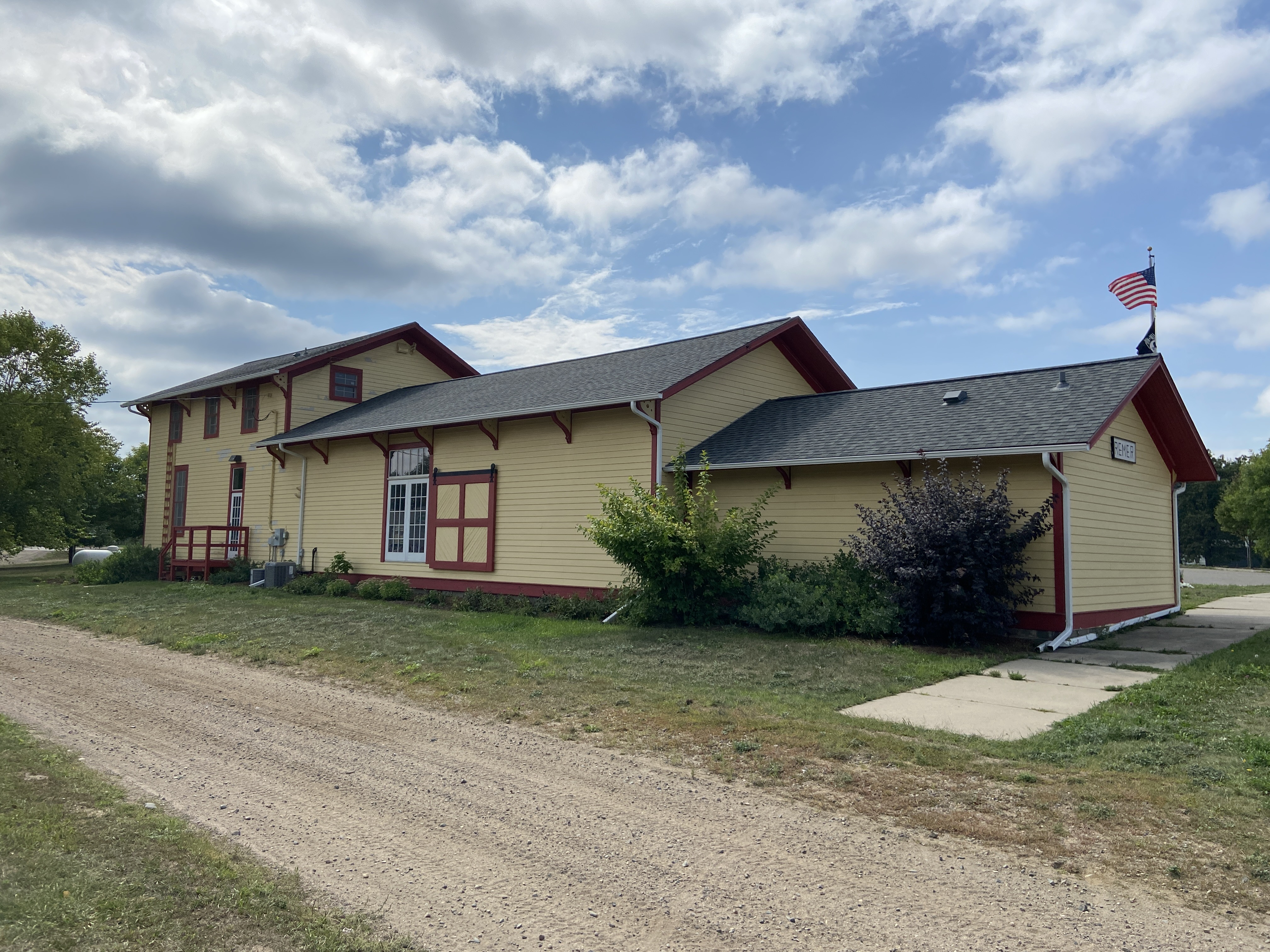
- Remer Library (Former Soo Line Depot)

- Location of Remer within Cass County, Minnesota
- Coordinates: 47°03′25″N 93°54′45″W
- Country: United States
- State: Minnesota
- County: Cass

Area
  - Total: 1.33 sq mi (3.44 km^{2})
  - Land: 1.33 sq mi (3.44 km^{2})
  - Water: 0 sq mi (0.00 km^{2})
- Elevation: 1,332 ft (406 m)

Population (2020)
  - Total: 391
  - Density: 294.3/sq mi (113.62/km^{2})
- Time zone: UTC-6 (Central (CST))
  - Summer (DST): UTC-5 (CDT)
- ZIP code: 56672
- Area code: 218
- FIPS code: 27-53782
- GNIS feature ID: 2396347
- Website: https://www.cityofremer.com/

Remer is a city in Cass County, Minnesota, United States. The population was 391 at the 2020 census. It is part of the Brainerd Micropolitan Statistical Area.

Minnesota State Highways 6 and 200 are two of the main arterial routes in the community.

== History ==
A post office called Remer has been in operation since 1904. The city was named for its first postmaster, William P. Remer.

Remer is also the location of the Thunder Lake Lodge, where Al Capone stayed on his vacations to Minnesota. The room he stayed in was named McCleary Cabin, which was originally built in 1912. In 2009, a motion-activated camera captured a picture of what some consider Bigfoot in an area near Remer.

Late in World War II, a logging camp manned by prisoners of war was at the site of an old CCC camp near Remer.

Up until 1959, the Soo Line provided passenger rail service at Remer station.

The town claims to have had Bigfoot sightings since the late 1800s, and holds a Bigfoot Days celebration each summer. The All Gas No Brakes series released a video documenting the 2020 festival.

== Geography ==
According to the United States Census Bureau, the city has an area of 1.38 square miles (3.57 km^{2}), all land. The elevation is 1,342 ft (409 m) above sea level.

== Demographics ==
Historical population
Census	Pop.	Note	%±
1920	290		—
1930	263		−9.3%
1940	407		54.8%
1950	412		1.2%
1960	492		19.4%
1970	403		−18.1%
1980	396		−1.7%
1990	342		−13.6%
2000	372		8.8%
2010	370		−0.5%
2020	391		5.7%
U.S. Decennial Census

=== 2010 census ===
As of the census of 2010, there were 370 people, 175 households, and 95 families living in the city. The population density was 268.1 inhabitants per square mile (103.5/km^{2}). There were 208 housing units at an average density of 150.7 per square mile (58.2/km^{2}). The racial makeup of the city was 96.8% White, 1.9% Native American, and 1.4% from two or more races. Hispanic or Latino of any race were 1.6% of the population.

There were 175 households, of which 25.7% had children under the age of 18 living with them, 34.3% were married couples living together, 17.1% had a female householder with no husband present, 2.9% had a male householder with no wife present, and 45.7% were non-families. 38.9% of all households were made up of individuals, and 18.3% had someone living alone who was 65 years of age or older. The average household size was 2.11 and the average family size was 2.85.

The median age in the city was 43.5 years. 22.2% of residents were under the age of 18; 8.3% were between the ages of 18 and 24; 21.1% were from 25 to 44; 26.5% were from 45 to 64; and 21.9% were 65 years of age or older. The gender makeup of the city was 46.8% male and 53.2% female.

=== 2000 census ===
As of the census of 2000, there were 372 people, 178 households, and 95 families living in the city. The population density was 327.8 inhabitants per square mile (126.6/km^{2}). There were 198 housing units at an average density of 174.5 per square mile (67.4/km^{2}). The racial makeup of the city was 95.97% White, 0.27% African American, 2.69% Native American, and 1.08% from two or more races.

There were 178 households, out of which 29.8% had children under the age of 18 living with them, 39.3% were married couples living together, 10.1% had a female householder with no husband present, and 46.6% were non-families. 41.0% of all households were made up of individuals, and 28.1% had someone living alone who was 65 years of age or older. The average household size was 2.09 and the average family size was 2.87.

In the city, the population was spread out, with 25.5% under the age of 18, 5.9% from 18 to 24, 19.4% from 25 to 44, 26.3% from 45 to 64, and 22.8% who were 65 or older. The median age was 44. For every 100 females, there were 83.3 males. For every 100 females age 18 and over, there were 84.7 males.

The median income for a household in the city was $19,583, and the median income for a family was $27,500. Males had a median income of $28,000 versus $20,536 for females. The per capita income for the city was $11,674. About 25.9% of families and 34.5% of the population were below the poverty line, including 52.9% of those under age 18 and 22.2% of those age 65 or over.

== Records ==
As of 2007, Remer claimed to have the world's largest eagle statue.

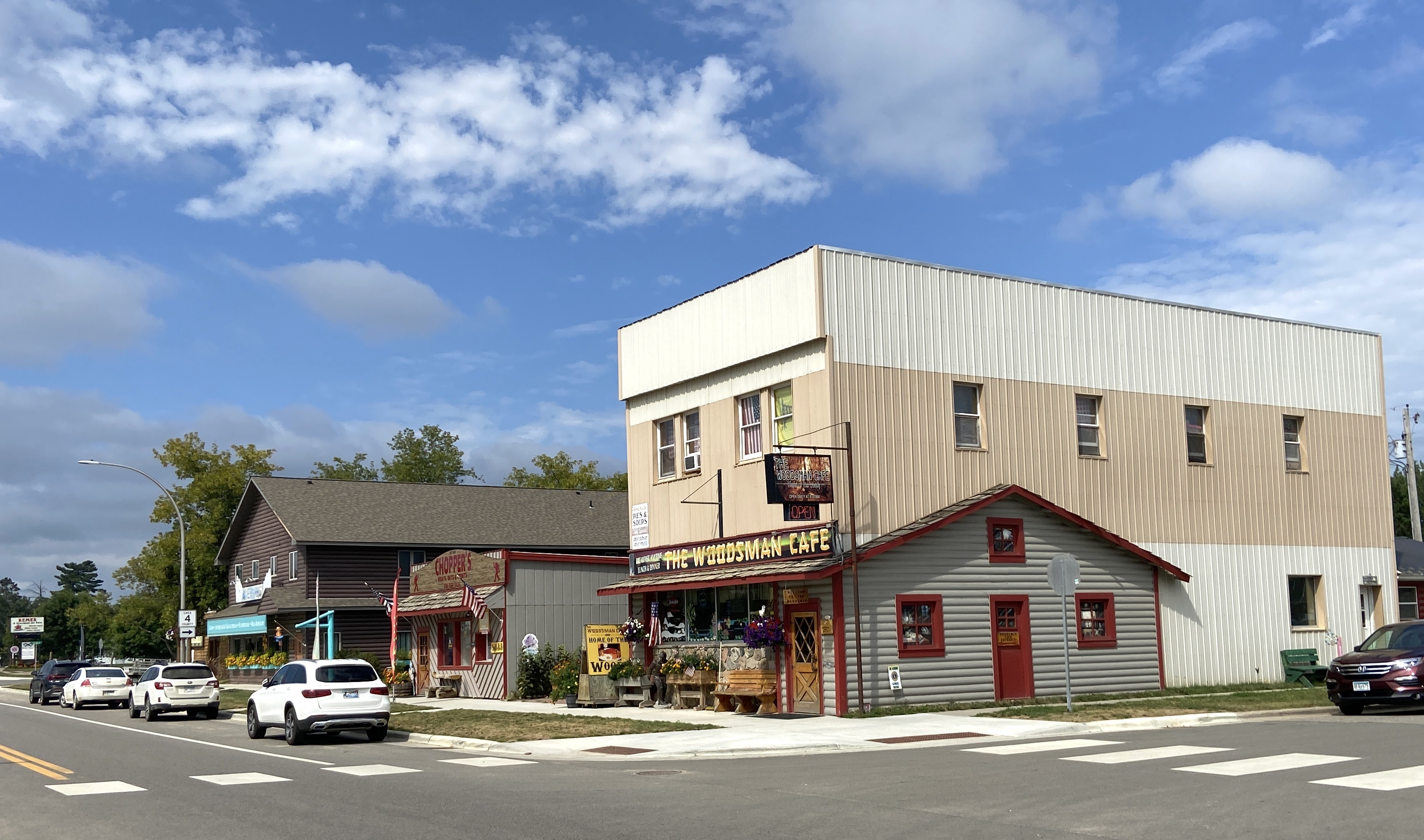
Businesses

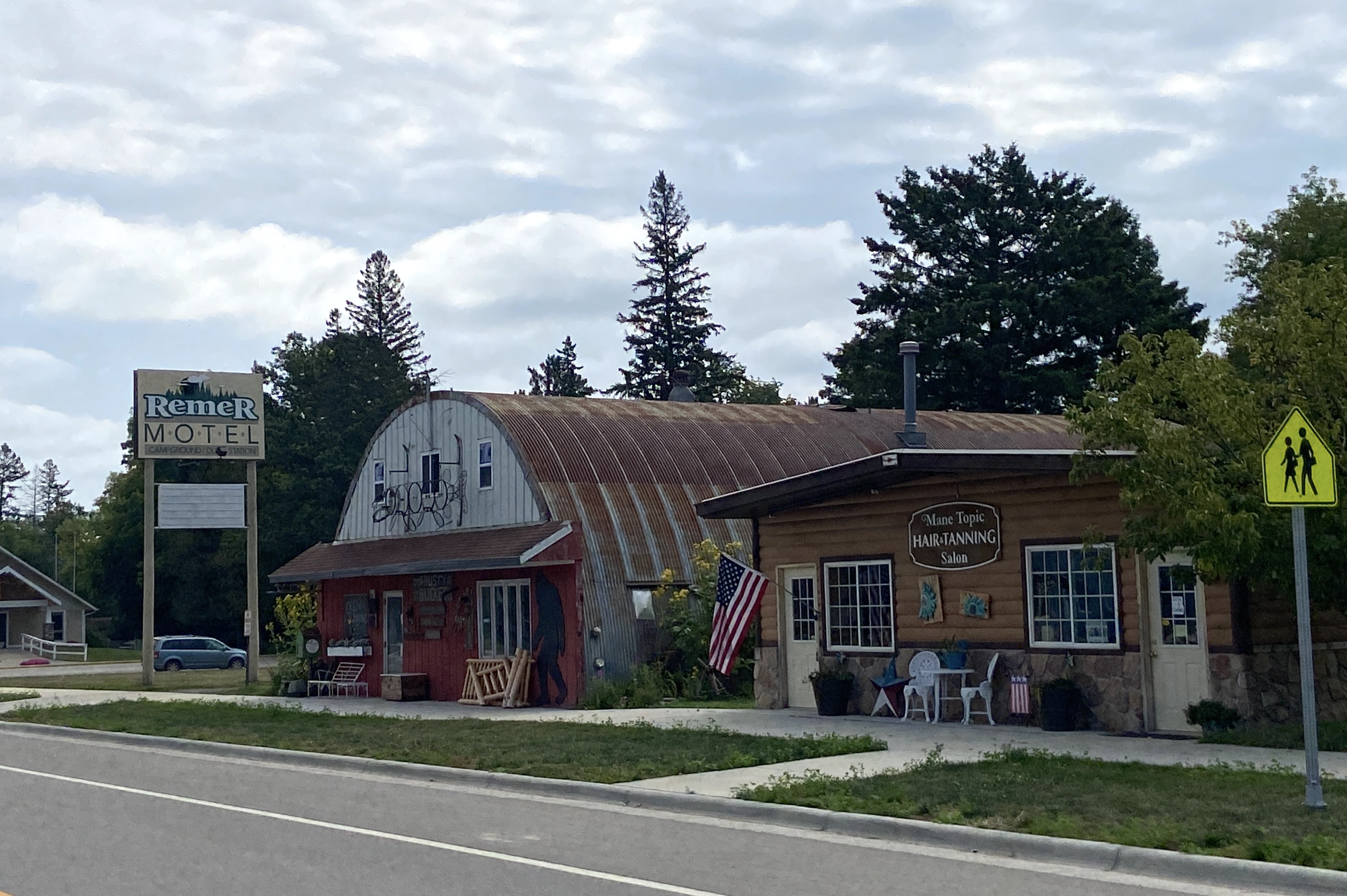
Businesses

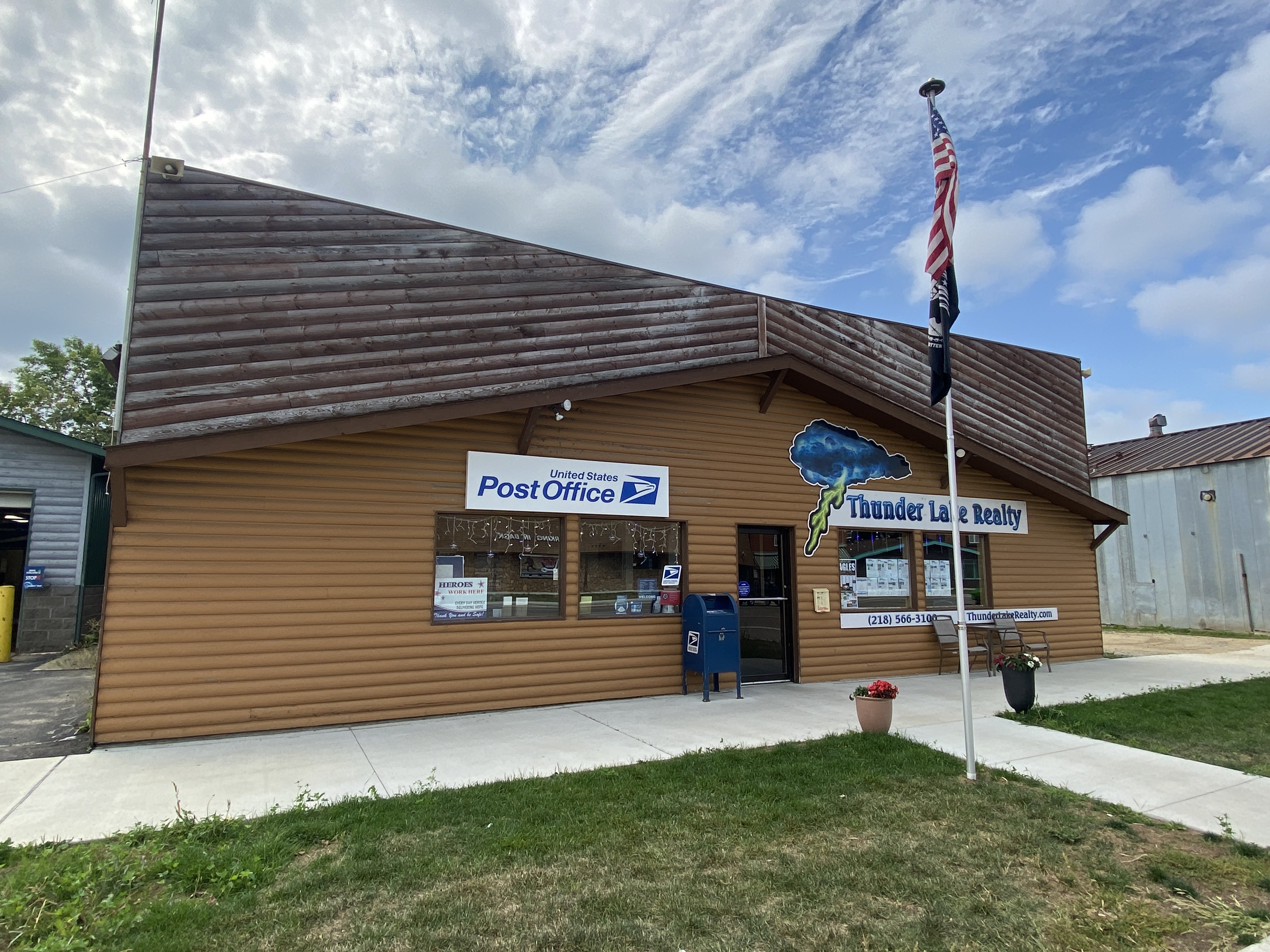
Post office

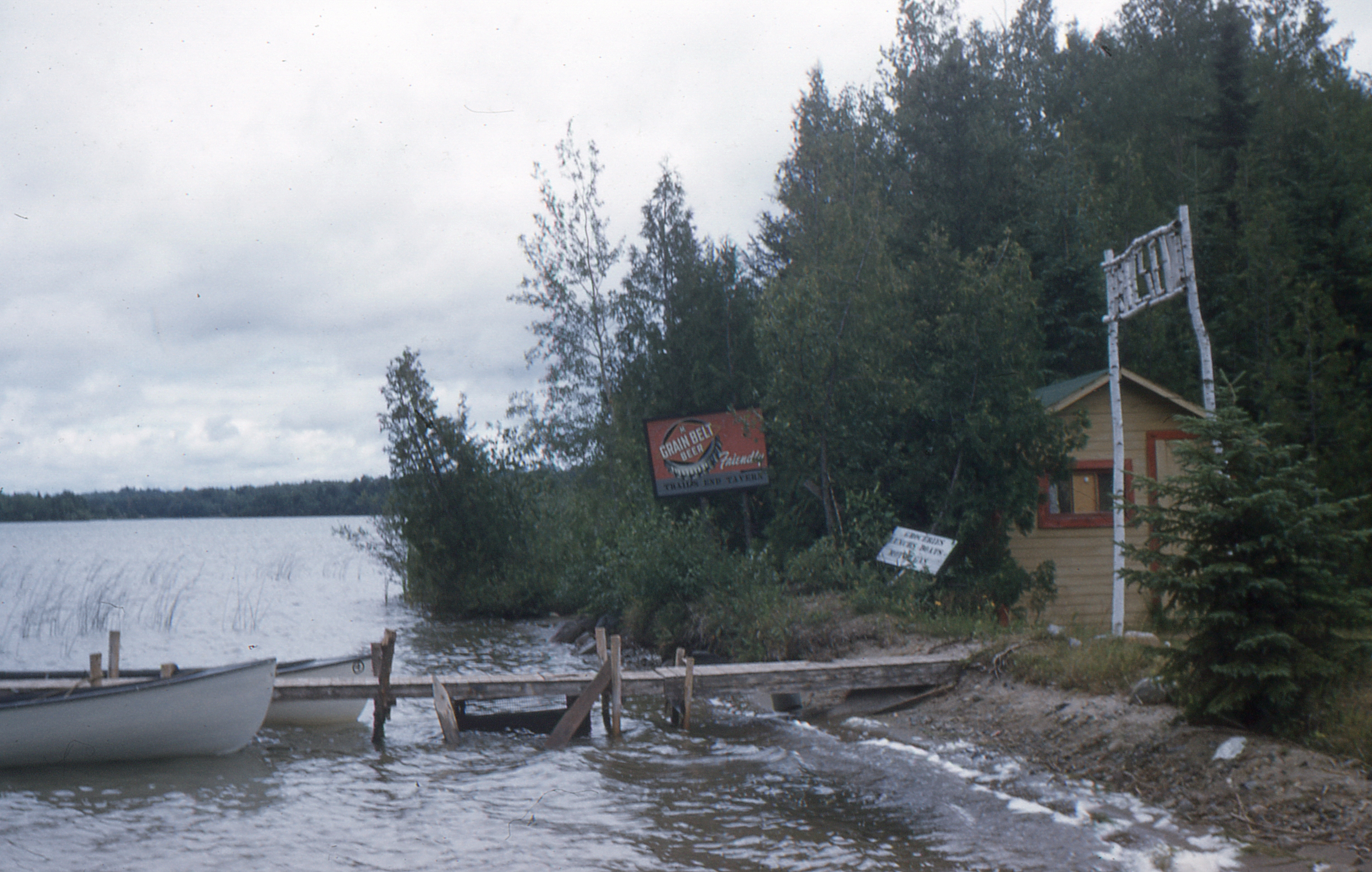
Thunder Lake resort in Remer, 1955

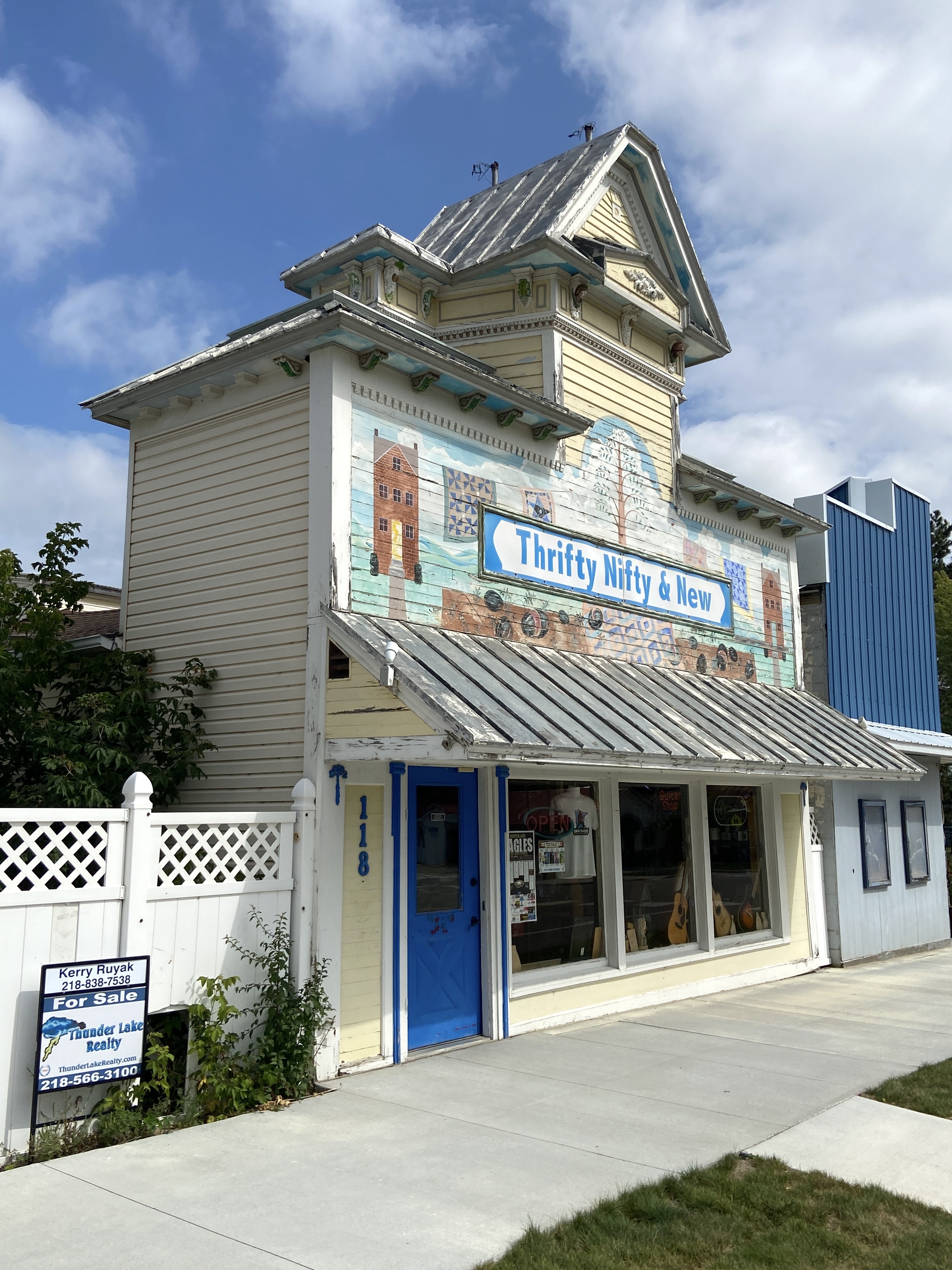
Eclectic building

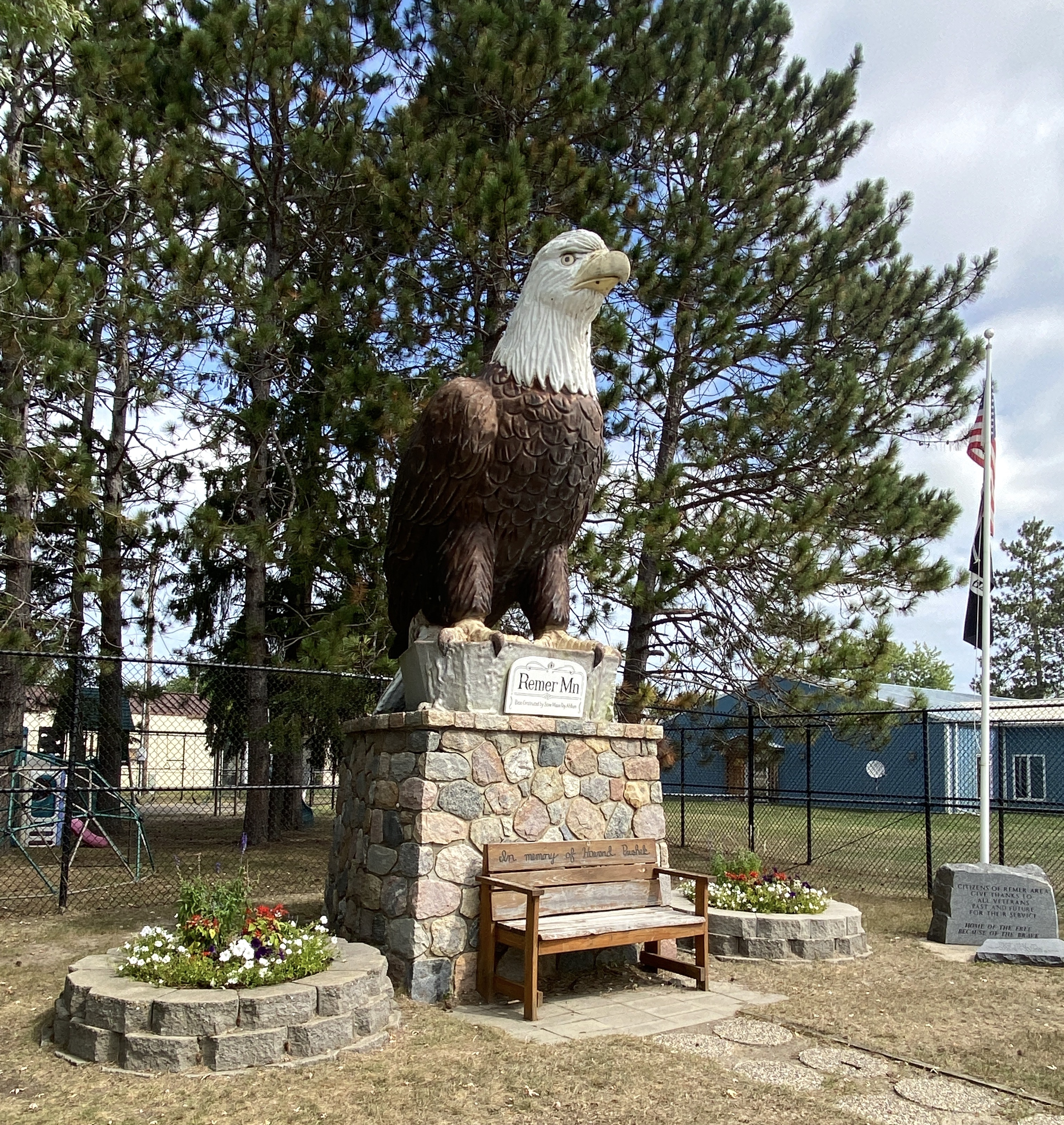
Veteran's Memorial
