= Moose Lake, Minnesota =

City in the United States

Moose Lake
- City
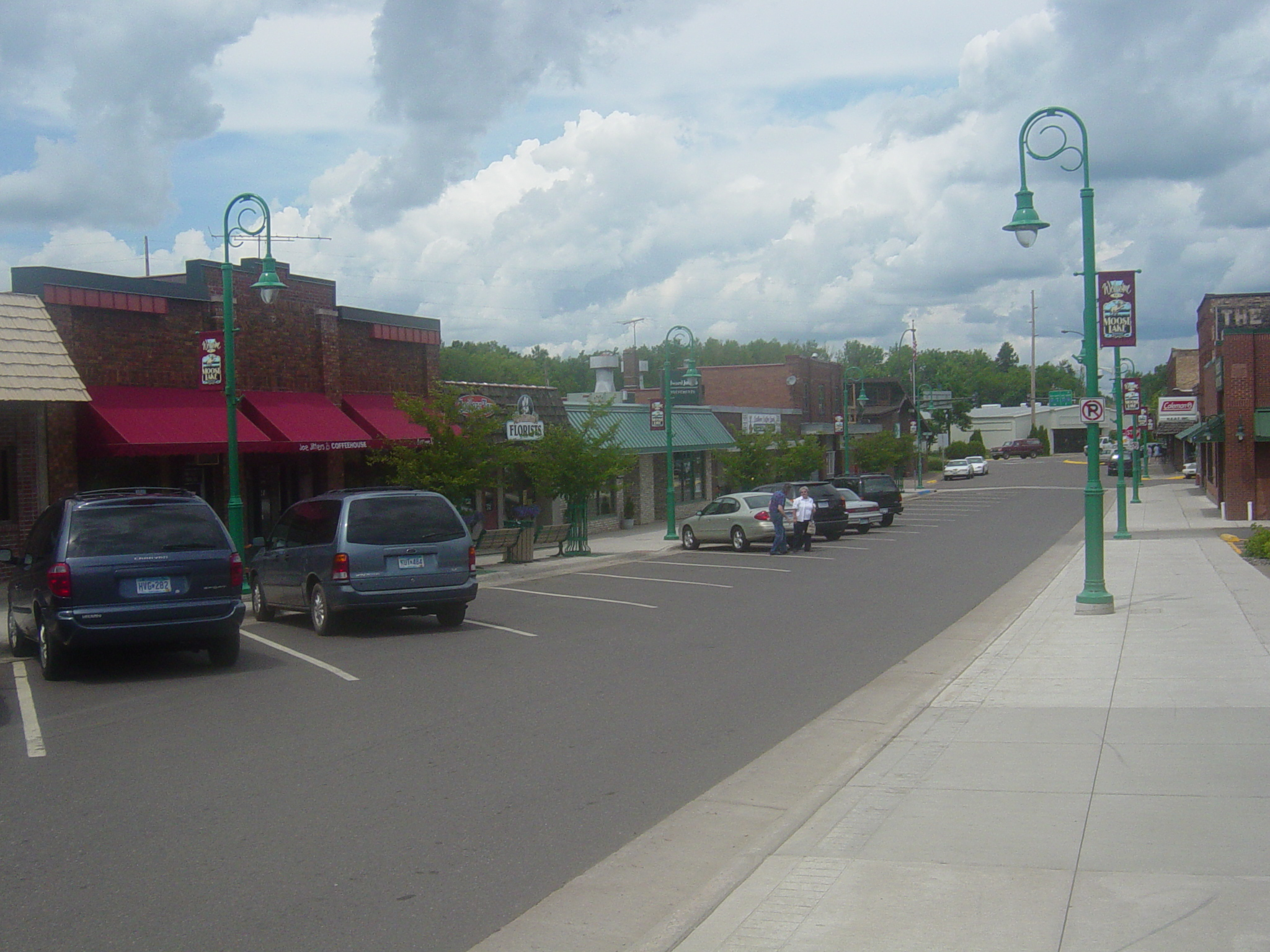
- Downtown Moose Lake

- Location of the city of Moose Lake within Carlton County, Minnesota
- Coordinates: 46°27′5″N 92°45′48″W
- Country: United States
- State: Minnesota
- County: Carlton

Area
  - Total: 3.68 sq mi (9.54 km^{2})
  - Land: 3.28 sq mi (8.49 km^{2})
  - Water: 0.41 sq mi (1.05 km^{2})
- Elevation: 1,060 ft (323 m)

Population (2020)
  - Total: 2,789
  - Estimate (2021): 2,565
  - Density: 850.4/sq mi (328.34/km^{2})
- Time zone: UTC-6 (CST)
  - Summer (DST): UTC-5 (CDT)
- ZIP code: 55767
- Area code: 218
- FIPS code: 27-43954
- GNIS feature ID: 0648082
- Website: www.cityofmooselake.gov

Moose Lake is a city in Carlton County, Minnesota, United States. The population was 2,789 at the 2020 census.

Interstate 35, State Highways 27 and 73, County 10, and County 61 are the main routes in Moose Lake.

Moose Lake State Park is nearby.

== Geography ==
According to the United States Census Bureau, the city has an area of 3.66 square miles (9.48 km^{2}), of which 3.27 square miles (8.47 km^{2}) is land and 0.39 square miles (1.01 km^{2}) is water.

The boundary between Carlton and Pine counties is nearby.

Moose Lake is 25 miles southwest of Cloquet, 43 miles southwest of Duluth, and 112 miles north of Minneapolis–Saint Paul.

== Climate ==
Like the rest of Minnesota, Moose Lake has a humid continental climate. Like the rest of northern Minnesota, it has the warm-summer variety with relatively cool nights year-round. Winter temperatures are very cold but dry compared to summer.

Climate data for Moose Lake, Minnesota (1991–2020 normals, extremes 1913–1918, 1928–2021)
Month	Jan	Feb	Mar	Apr	May	Jun	Jul	Aug	Sep	Oct	Nov	Dec	Year
Record high °F (°C)	55 (13)	57 (14)	80 (27)	92 (33)	93 (34)	99 (37)	104 (40)	99 (37)	97 (36)	87 (31)	72 (22)	57 (14)	104 (40)
Mean daily maximum °F (°C)	19.8 (−6.8)	25.3 (−3.7)	37.7 (3.2)	52.1 (11.2)	65.7 (18.7)	75.1 (23.9)	80.2 (26.8)	78.0 (25.6)	68.9 (20.5)	54.1 (12.3)	38.0 (3.3)	24.7 (−4.1)	51.6 (10.9)
Daily mean °F (°C)	10.3 (−12.1)	14.8 (−9.6)	27.5 (−2.5)	41.0 (5.0)	53.3 (11.8)	62.9 (17.2)	68.8 (20.4)	67.1 (19.5)	58.6 (14.8)	45.0 (7.2)	30.4 (−0.9)	16.8 (−8.4)	41.4 (5.2)
Mean daily minimum °F (°C)	0.7 (−17.4)	4.3 (−15.4)	17.4 (−8.1)	29.9 (−1.2)	41.0 (5.0)	50.7 (10.4)	57.3 (14.1)	56.2 (13.4)	48.2 (9.0)	35.8 (2.1)	22.8 (−5.1)	8.9 (−12.8)	31.1 (−0.5)
Record low °F (°C)	−53 (−47)	−41 (−41)	−41 (−41)	−8 (−22)	16 (−9)	26 (−3)	34 (1)	29 (−2)	18 (−8)	2 (−17)	−31 (−35)	−49 (−45)	−53 (−47)
Average precipitation inches (mm)	0.79 (20)	0.92 (23)	1.39 (35)	2.57 (65)	3.42 (87)	4.75 (121)	4.80 (122)	3.73 (95)	3.18 (81)	3.10 (79)	1.68 (43)	1.17 (30)	31.50 (800)
Average precipitation days (≥ 0.01 in)	6.1	5.3	5.7	7.8	10.8	11.7	10.0	9.1	9.3	10.0	6.8	7.1	99.7
Source: NOAA

== History ==
Moose Lake was one of the communities affected by the 1918 Cloquet fire. The Minneapolis, St. Paul and Sault Ste. Marie Depot is a museum that tells the story of that fire. The Minnesota Home Guard assisted the area after the fire.

== Demographics ==
Historical population
Census	Pop.	Note	%±
1880	100		—
1890	169		69.0%
1900	354		109.5%
1910	526		48.6%
1920	571		8.6%
1930	742		29.9%
1940	1,432		93.0%
1950	1,603		11.9%
1960	1,514		−5.6%
1970	1,400		−7.5%
1980	1,408		0.6%
1990	1,206		−14.3%
2000	2,239		85.7%
2010	2,751		22.9%
2020	2,789		1.4%
2021 (est.)	2,565		−8.0%
U.S. Decennial Census; 2020 Census

=== 2020 census ===
As of the 2020 census, Moose Lake had a population of 2,789. The median age was 42.3 years. 9.3% of residents were under the age of 18 and 16.5% of residents were 65 years of age or older. For every 100 females there were 282.1 males, and for every 100 females age 18 and over there were 334.5 males age 18 and over.

0.0% of residents lived in urban areas, while 100.0% lived in rural areas.

There were 600 households in Moose Lake, of which 22.8% had children under the age of 18 living in them. Of all households, 32.5% were married-couple households, 23.0% were households with a male householder and no spouse or partner present, and 37.8% were households with a female householder and no spouse or partner present. About 48.3% of all households were made up of individuals and 24.5% had someone living alone who was 65 years of age or older.

There were 670 housing units, of which 10.4% were vacant. The homeowner vacancy rate was 2.0% and the rental vacancy rate was 6.0%.

Racial composition as of the 2020 census
Race	Number	Percent
White	2,099	75.3%
Black or African American	404	14.5%
American Indian and Alaska Native	124	4.4%
Asian	5	0.2%
Native Hawaiian and Other Pacific Islander	0	0.0%
Some other race	31	1.1%
Two or more races	126	4.5%
Hispanic or Latino (of any race)	105	3.8%

=== 2010 census ===
As of the census of 2010, there were 2,751 people, 648 households, and 318 families living in the city. The population density was 841.3 inhabitants per square mile (324.8/km^{2}). There were 732 housing units at an average density of 223.9 per square mile (86.4/km^{2}). The racial makeup of the city was 79.2% White, 14.4% African American, 3.7% Native American, 0.9% Asian, 0.5% from other races, and 1.2% from two or more races. Hispanic or Latino of any race were 4.0% of the population.

There were 648 households, of which 24.4% had children under the age of 18 living with them, 33.2% were married couples living together, 11.6% had a female householder with no husband present, 4.3% had a male householder with no wife present, and 50.9% were non-families. 46.6% of all households were made up of individuals, and 27.8% had someone living alone who was 65 years of age or older. The average household size was 2.01 and the average family size was 2.84.

The median age in the city was 39 years. 11.1% of residents were under the age of 18; 9.2% were between the ages of 18 and 24; 39.9% were from 25 to 44; 25.7% were from 45 to 64; and 14.1% were 65 years of age or older. The gender makeup of the city was 73.4% male and 26.6% female.

=== 2000 census ===
As of the census of 2000, there were 2,239 people, 577 households, and 294 families living in the city. The population density was 811.1 inhabitants per square mile (313.2/km^{2}). There were 628 housing units at an average density of 227.5 per square mile (87.8/km^{2}). The racial makeup of the city was 79.99% White, 11.61% African American, 3.75% Native American, 0.80% Asian, 1.38% from other races, and 2.46% from two or more races. Hispanic or Latino of any race were 3.53% of the population. 22.9% were of German, 10.9% Norwegian, 10.3% Swedish, 9.8% Finnish, 6.3% Polish and 5.1% Irish ancestry.

There were 577 households, out of which 25.1% had children under the age of 18 living with them, 38.5% were married couples living together, 9.7% had a female householder with no husband present, and 49.0% were non-families. 46.3% of all households were made up of individuals, and 29.8% had someone living alone who was 65 years of age or older. The average household size was 2.03 and the average family size was 2.88.

In the city, the population was spread out, with 12.6% under the age of 18, 13.7% from 18 to 24, 38.4% from 25 to 44, 17.3% from 45 to 64, and 18.0% who were 65 years of age or older. The median age was 37 years. For every 100 females, there were 197.3 males. For every 100 females age 18 and over, there were 227.1 males.

The median income for a household in the city was $27,130, and the median income for a family was $37,917. Males had a median income of $31,641 versus $24,167 for females. The per capita income for the city was $14,128. About 5.0% of families and 10.1% of the population were below the poverty line, including 11.6% of those under age 18 and 8.8% of those age 65 or over.

== Media ==
The Moose Lake Star Gazette was founded in 1983. It is a weekly that comes out on Thursdays. It is owned by Franklin Newspapers and had a circulation of 1,774 in 2019. The following newspapers have also been published in Moose Lake:

- Moose Lake Star (1896–1906)
- Star Gazette (1907–1962)
- Moose Lake Star Gazette (1962–1978)
- Star-gazette (1978–1983)
- Arrowhead leader (since 1982)

== In popular culture ==
- Moose Lake was depicted in the 1996 film Fargo, in which the kidnappers hide out in a cabin on the lake. The scene was actually filmed on Square Lake in Stillwater.
- Blu and Linda in the 2011 film Rio lived here at the start of the film.

== Transportation ==
The Moose Lake Carlton County Airport is three miles southwest of the city and has a lighted, paved, 3,200-foot runway.

== Business ==
One of Minnesota's Sex Offender Program's two facilities is in Moose Lake.
