= Lake Superior agate =

Type of iron-colored agate

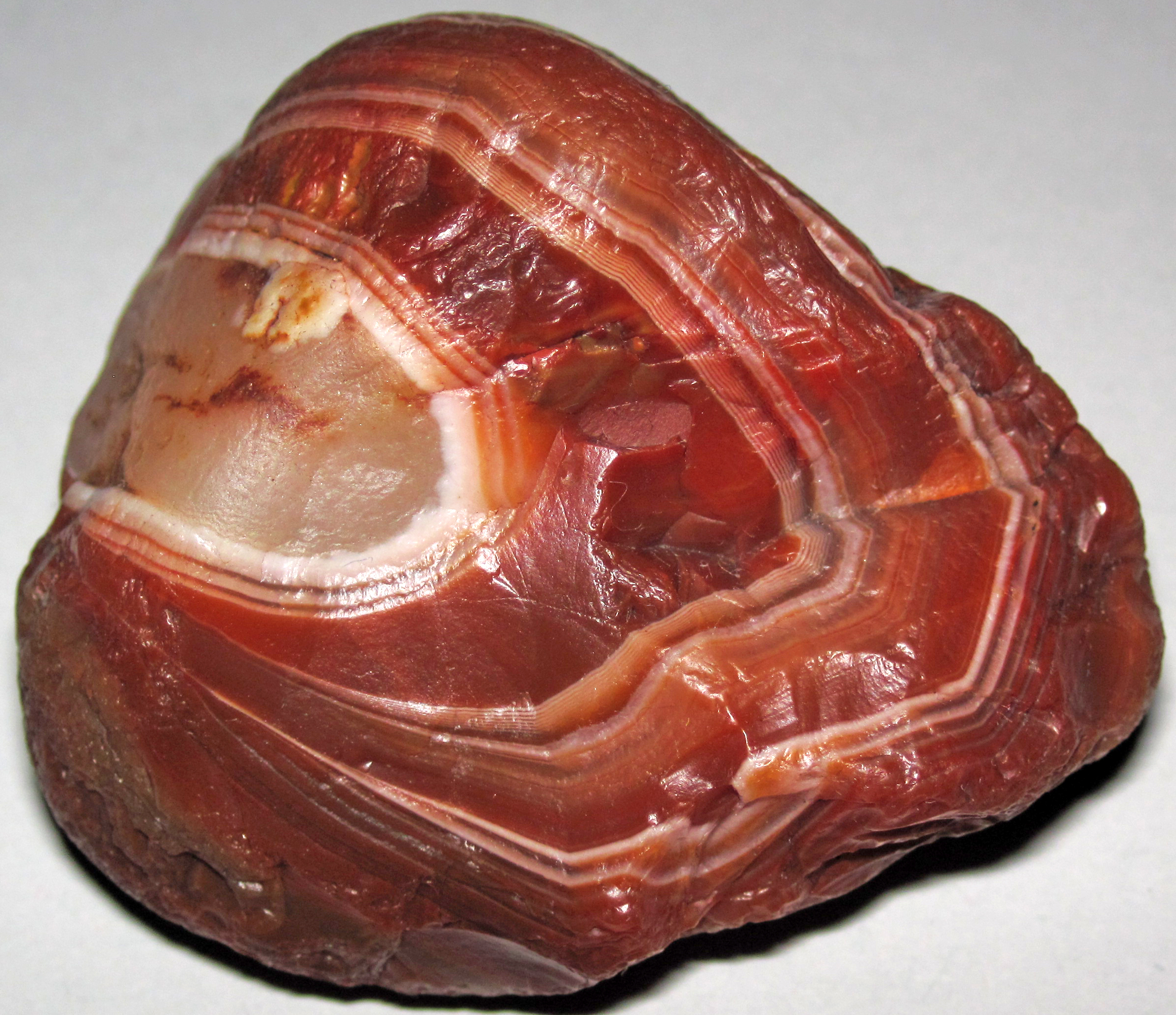
- Lake Superior agate found offshore Keweenaw Peninsula, Michigan

General
- Category: Tectosilicate minerals
- Group: Quartz group
- Formula: SiO_{2} (silicon dioxide)
- IMA status: Variety of quartz (chalcedony)
- Crystal system: Trigonal (quartz) or monoclinic (moganite)

Identification
- Color: Common: red, orange, dull yellow, white, pink, gray, tan, brown Rare: blue, green, purple, bright yellow
- Crystal habit: Cryptocrystalline silica
- Cleavage: None
- Fracture: Conchoidal, subconchoidal
- Tenacity: Brittle
- Mohs scale hardness: 6.5–7
- Luster: Waxy, vitreous when polished
- Streak: White
- Diaphaneity: Translucent to opaque
- Specific gravity: 2.6
- Density: 2.6 g/cm³
- Optical properties: Uniaxial (+)
- Refractive index: 1.530–1.543
- Birefringence: Up to 0.004
- Pleochroism: Absent
- Common impurities: Iron oxides (goethite, hematite, limonite)
- Size: 95% are marble-sized, roughly 5% are ping-pong ball-sized or 2–4 ounces (57–113 g), less than 1% are larger and can be softball-sized or over 1 pound (450 g)

Lake Superior agate is a type of iron-colored agate originating from the Lake Superior region of the United States and Canada. It commonly occurs as a collectible beach stone on the Lake Superior shoreline in Minnesota, Michigan, Wisconsin, and Ontario, and it can also be found in glacial deposits in these and several Midwestern states. As a gemstone, Lake Superior agate is valued for its vibrant bands in predominant shades of red, orange, and white, but they may also be other colors. Lake Superior agates are believed to be the world's oldest agates, having formed within the basaltic lava flows of the Midcontinent Rift System roughly 1.1 billion years ago. In 1969, the Lake Superior agate was designated by the Minnesota Legislature as the official state gemstone.

== Geology ==
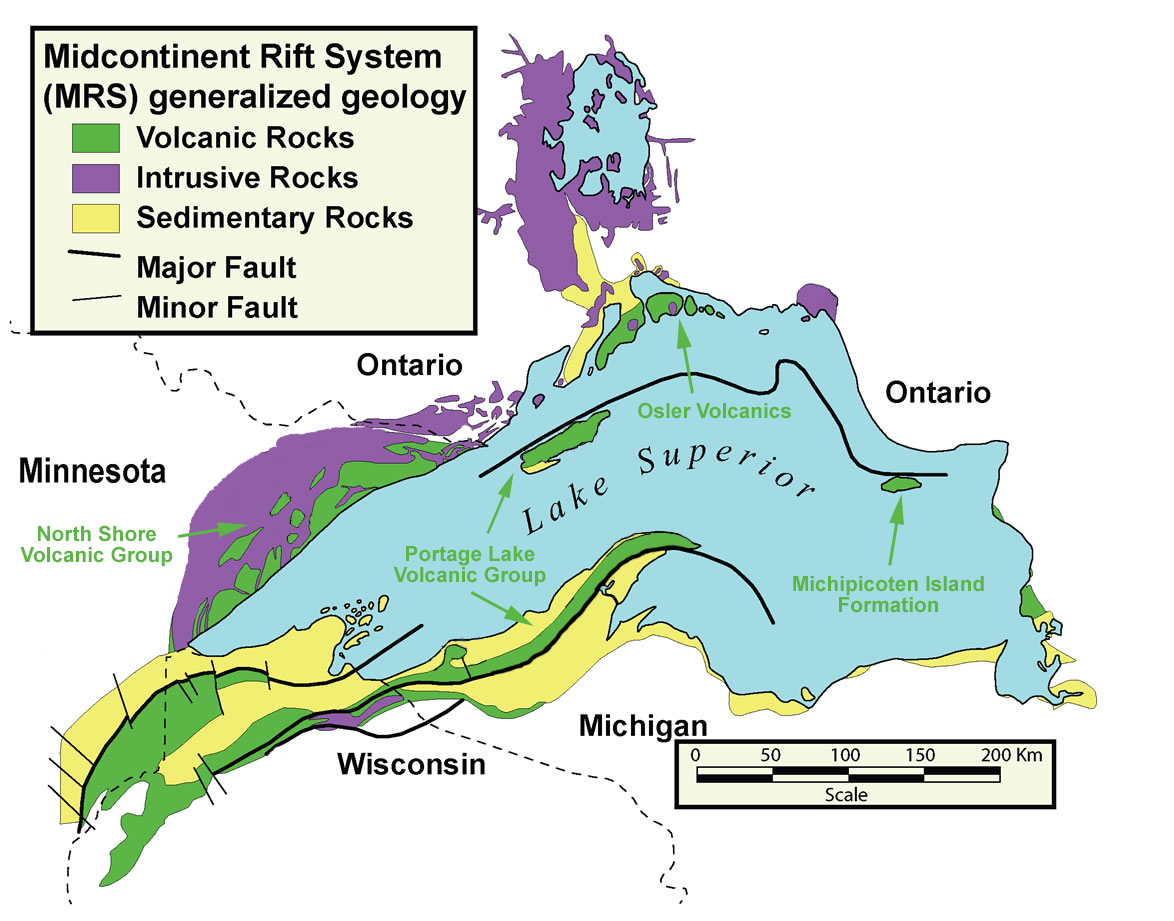
A geologic map of the Superior trough, the northernmost segment of the Midcontinent Rift System. Lake Superior agates formed within several of the volcanic rock units (labeled in green).

Lake Superior agates are believed to be the world's oldest agates. They formed as nodules within iron-rich lava flows that occurred roughly 1.1 billion years ago during the Mesoproterozoic era. These lava flows resulted from the Midcontinent Rift, when the North American craton attempted to split apart along a rift 2,000 kilometres (1,200 miles) in length that extended from present-day Lake Superior southwest as far as Kansas and southeast into Lower Michigan. While volcanic activity occurred along the entire rift, Lake Superior agates only formed in the Superior trough, which formed the basin of Lake Superior when the last glaciers retreated from the area roughly 10,000 years ago.

As the lava flows solidified into layers of basalt (or less commonly, rhyolite), bubbles of water vapor and carbon dioxide became trapped within the rock, forming vesicles. Soon after, silica- and iron-rich groundwater permeated the basalt, forming a gel within the vesicles. Gradually, layers of chalcedony fibers and iron oxides developed from the gel, forming solid nodules of agate.

Over the next billion years, some agate nodules were separated from their host rock by weathering. However, most remained embedded in the basalt until the ice ages of the Pleistocene epoch.

During the Pleistocene glaciation, multiple glaciers descended from Canada and exposed the basalt, crushing it and freeing the much harder agates. The glaciers transported the agates across the Midwest, leaving behind rough-tumbled gravel deposits called glacial till. Sources differ as to which specific glacial periods were responsible for eroding and redepositing the agates. According to one source, Lake Superior agates were named for a specific glacial deposit 1–1.8 million years in age called the Lake Superior Till. Other sources implicate the last glacial period roughly 10,000–110,000 years ago, and one specifically points to the Superior lobe that moved into Minnesota roughly 10,000–15,000 years ago.

While many Lake Superior agates are found separated from their host rock due to glacial erosion or weathering, some can still be found embedded in the basalt. Lake Superior agates that have been subject to weathering or erosion are typically translucent and are less likely to contain inclusions, since the softer structures are easily broken apart. By contrast, Lake Superior agates still attached to their host rock are frequently opaque.

Today, the remains of the basalt flows are exposed along the north and south shores of Lake Superior. They comprise portions of the North Shore Volcanic Group in Minnesota, the Portage Lake Volcanic Group in Michigan, and the Osler Volcanics and Michipicoten Island Formation in Ontario. Lake Superior agates have also been found in place in the Lake Shore Traps, a group of lava flows in the Keweenaw Peninsula that formed during a brief resumption of volcanic activity roughly 7 million years after the formation of the Portage Lake Volcanic Group.

== Varieties ==
Lake Superior agates occur in a large number of different varieties that are distinguished by unique characteristics. They vary greatly in prevalence and desirability with collectors. Most Lake Superior agates contain a variation of fortification banding; multiple features such as inclusions, color variations, and signs of weathering can occur together in the same agate.

=== Most common ===
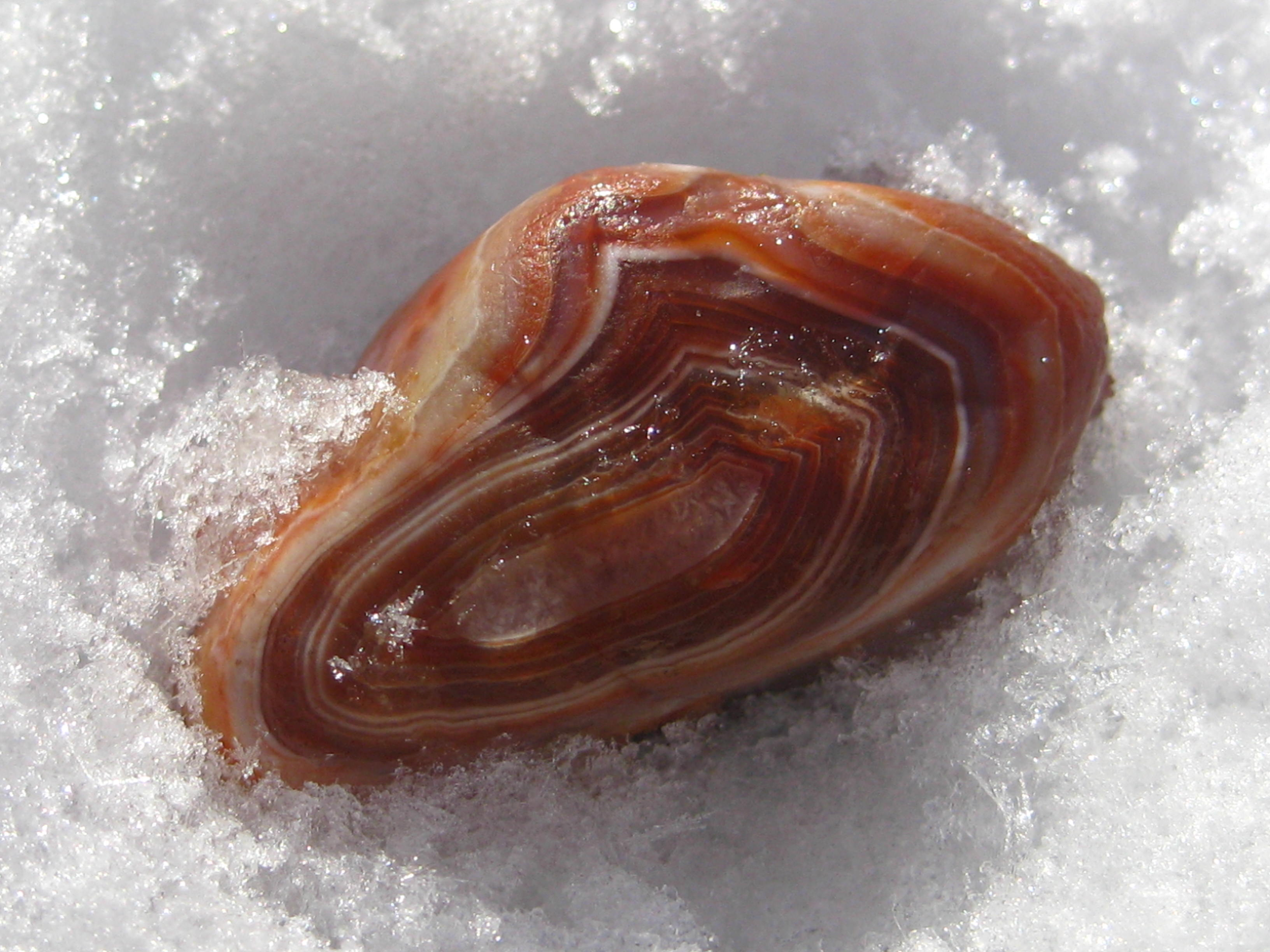
Lake Superior agate with fortification banding

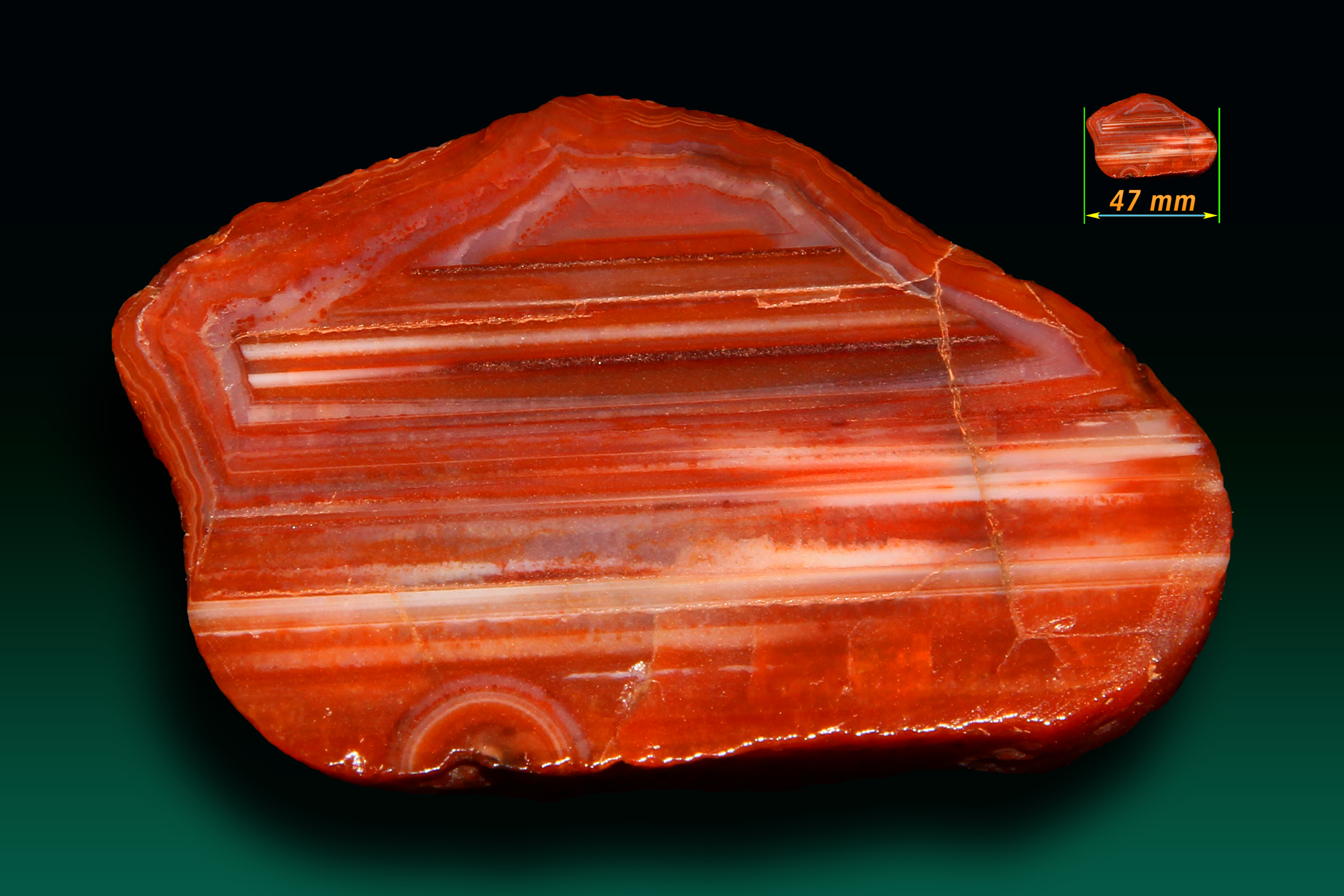
Lake Superior agate slab with water-level banding

- Fortification agates have concentric bands that follow the shape of the cavity they formed in. There are typically two alternating band colors, such as red and white, but additional band colors may also be present. Fortification agates are one of the most sought-after varieties, and they are what most people think of when they hear the word "agate".
- Water-level agates have straight, parallel bands that formed in the direction of gravity. They are somewhat less common than fortification agates.
- Surface-stained agates have colorations that appear only on their exposed surfaces. Surface stains in Lake Superior agates are typically red from hematite or yellow from limonite and occur when loose, buried agates come into contact with iron-rich groundwater. When these agates are polished or weathered, their true color, which is often gray, may be exposed. Lake Superior agates can also be bleached white by acidic groundwater or prolonged exposure to sunlight, though this is uncommon. Surface-stained Lake Superior agates are not usually desirable, although surface colorations can improve the value of otherwise dull specimens.
- Moss agates exhibit a tangled, moss-like pattern and are very common, but they are not well sought after by Lake Superior agate collectors. They form when dendritic structures on the surface of an agate are pushed inward with the silica gel during their formation. Moss agates usually lack any form of banding; therefore they are not true agates according to the mineralogical definition.

=== Common ===
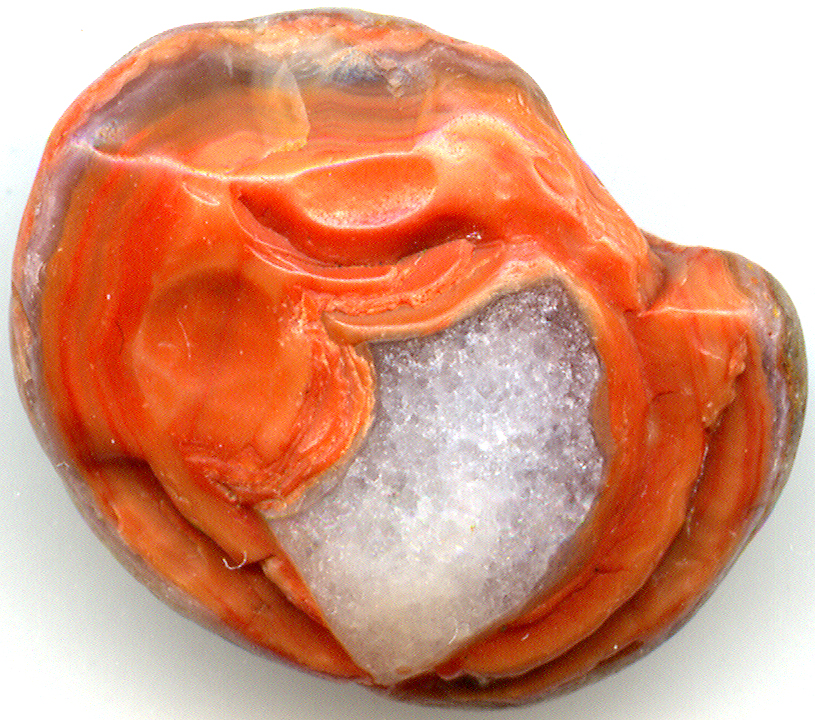
Lake Superior agate from Iowa with paint coloration and a macrocrystalline quartz center

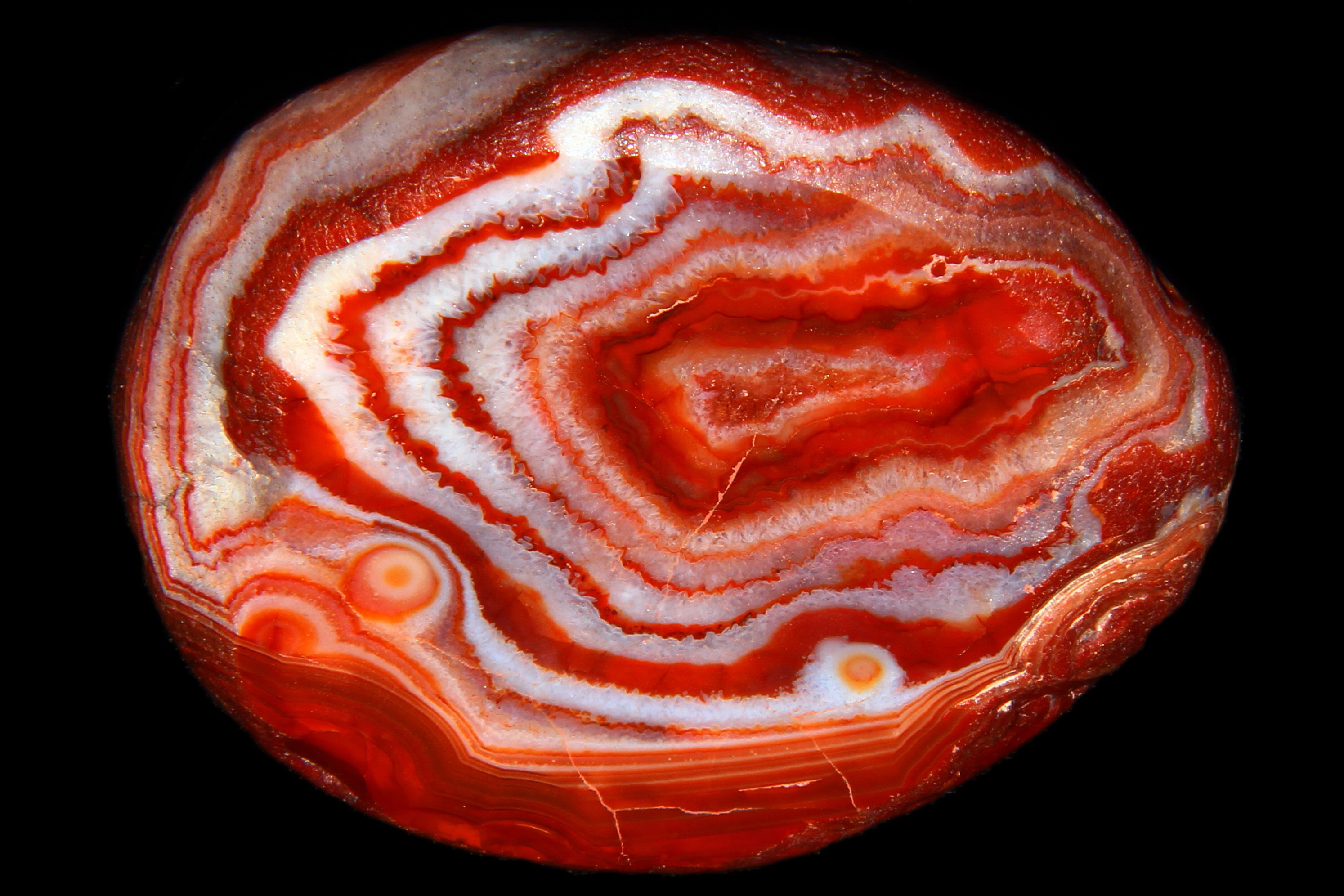
Floater agate with multiple macrocrystalline quartz bands (white) from Duluth, Minnesota

- Tube agates contain tunnel-like structures that extend all the way through the agate. Lake Superior tube agates are relatively common, although specimens with banded or hollow tubes are rarer. Tube agates formed when chalcedony grew around sagenitic inclusions embedded within the agates, forming stalactitic structures. Visible "eyes" can also appear on the surface of tube agates if a cut is made (or the agate is weathered) perpendicular to the tube.
- Banded quartz agates have bands composed of macrocrystalline (visible) quartz crystals. They often have a solid quartz center and little to no chalcedony bands, which only occur near the husk. Lake Superior agates that are mostly composed of macrocrystalline quartz are often called quartz balls and are not very valuable unless they have very well-defined bands or inclusions.
- Paint agates have opaque bands and can exhibit a wider variety of colors, including pink, orange, tan, brown, blue, and white. They have been subject to very little weathering and are often found still embedded in their host rock. Paint agates, particularly those with fortification banding, are one of the most valuable varieties of Lake Superior agate.
- Floater agates, or floaters, have chalcedony bands that are completely surrounded by macrocrystalline quartz. The banding may be present only in the center of the agate, or there may be multiple chalcedony bands alternated with quartz bands. Floater agates can be valuable when they are colorful and do not contain excessive amounts of macrocrystalline quartz.

=== Uncommon ===
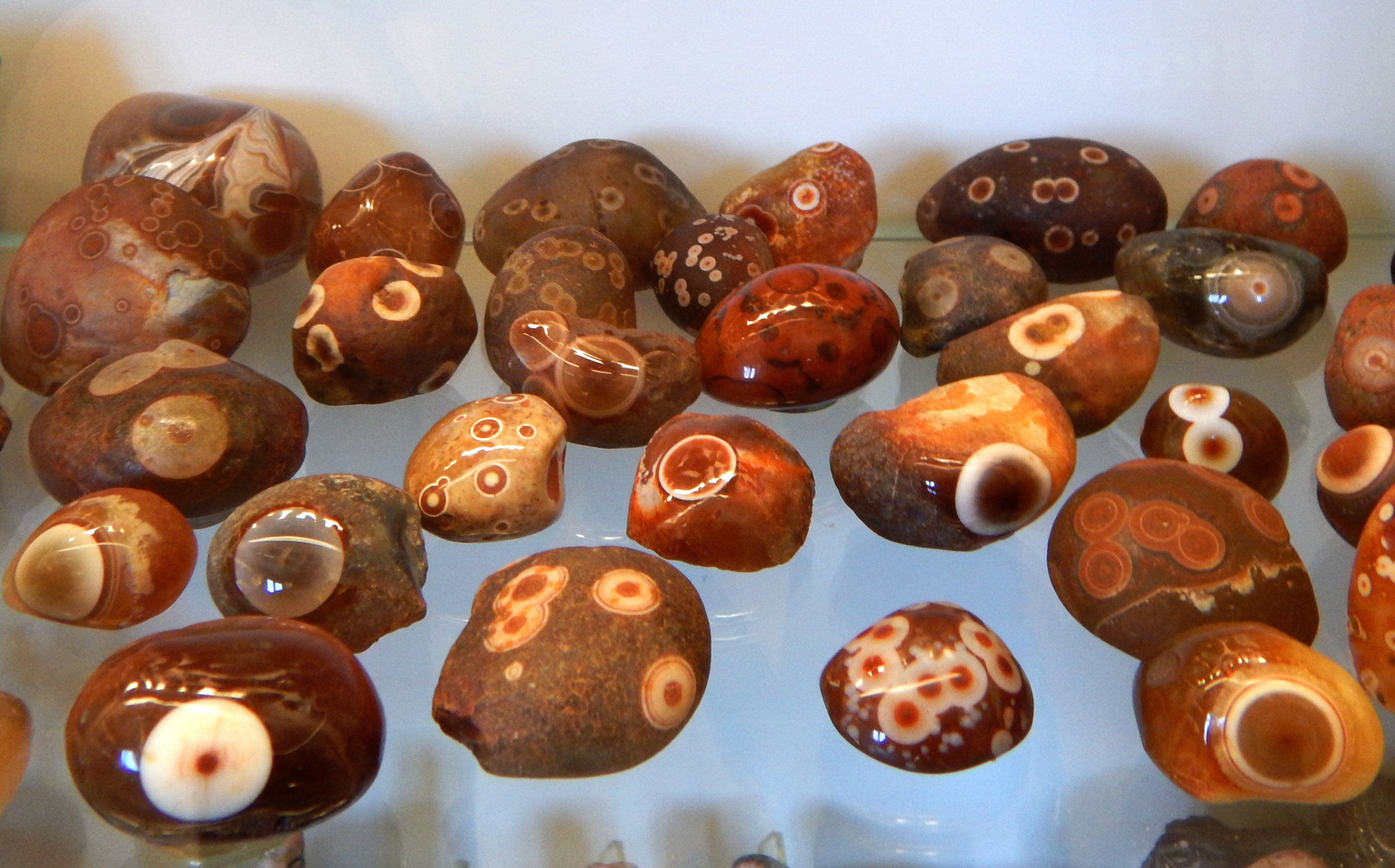
Lake Superior eye agates for sale at an agate shop

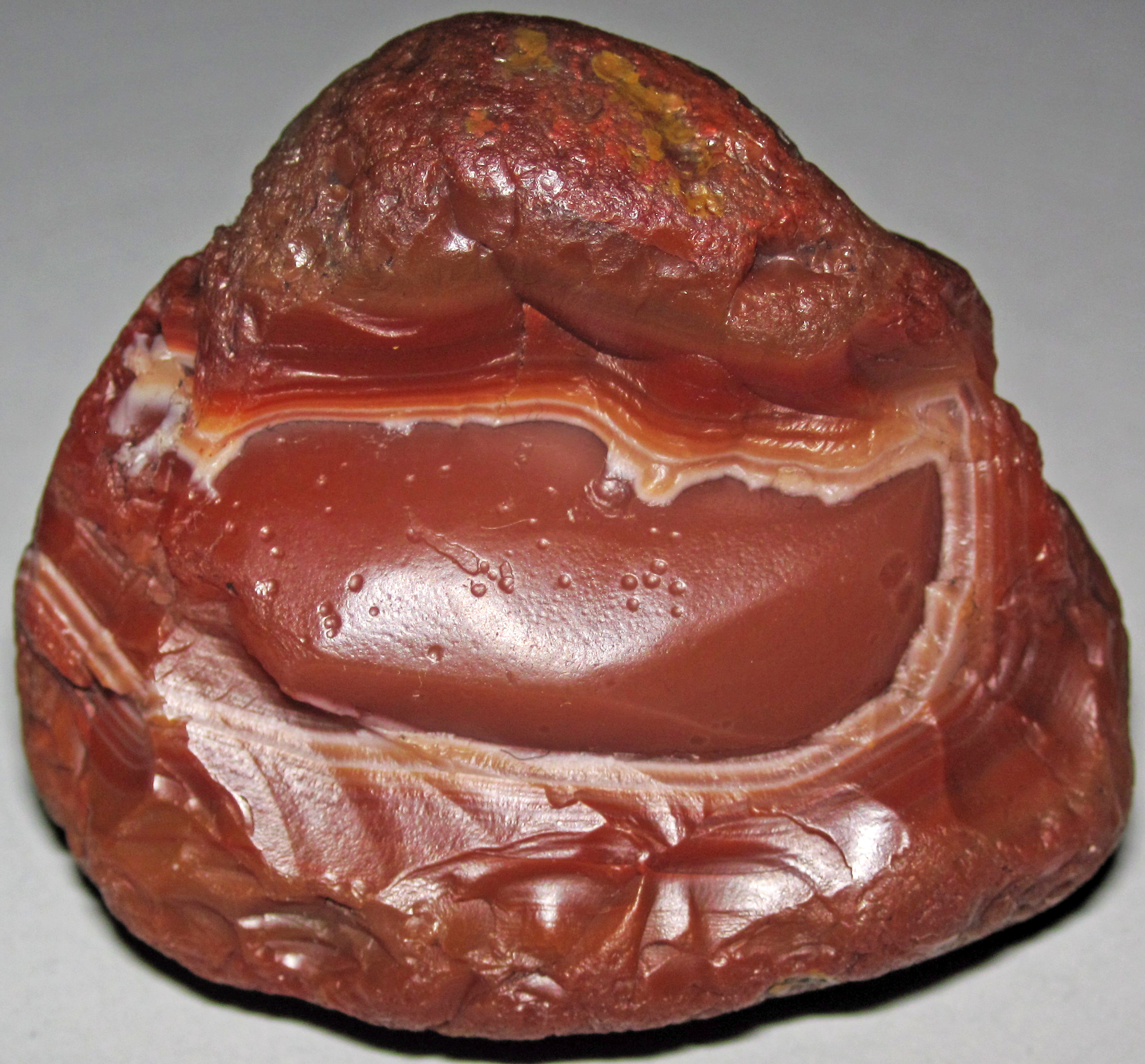
Lake Superior peeled agate with several bands "peeled" back in the center

- Faulted agates have bands that have been broken and slightly shifted by rock movement and then re-cemented together by chalcedony. They have the appearance of rock layers with fault lines running through them. Faulted agates are generally uncommon among Lake Superior agates but slightly more common in the Keweenaw Peninsula.
- Brecciated agates also have bands that have been broken apart and re-cemented with chalcedony, but they consist of disjointed band fragments at random angles. They are a form of breccia, which is a textural term for any rock composed of angular fragments. Brecciated Lake Superior agates are uncommon, and high quality specimens are rare.
- Eye agates have one or more circular, concentric rings on their surfaces. These "eyes" are actually hemispheres that formed on the husk of the agate and extend inward like a bowl. Lake Superior eye agates are a favorite among agate collectors.
- Sagenitic agates, or sagenites, have acicular (needle-shaped) inclusions of another mineral, usually a zeolite such as thomsonite, natrolite, or mesolite. These crystals form radial sprays or circles within the agate, which may lack typical chalcedony banding. Colorful, well-formed Lake Superior sagenites are rare and usually found in Minnesota; lower-quality specimens are somewhat more common.
- Dendritic agates have dark-colored, fern-like patterns (dendrites) that formed on the surface or in the spaces between bands. They are composed of iron oxides such as hematite or goethite. Dendrites are actually fairly common in Lake Superior agates, but most are very small and go unnoticed.
- Peeled agates, or peelers, are fortification agates that have smooth, solid-colored surfaces in recessed spaces between bands. Their appearance resembles that of an onion with its outer layers partially removed. Peeled agates form when water seeps into the microscopic spaces between agate bands and freezes, eventually causing the outer bands to break away. The popularity of Lake Superior peelers varies with collectors, but they are typically less valuable than unweathered agates, especially if little banding is left visible.
- Agate geodes have hollow cavities in their centers that are often lined with small crystals of quartz. Less commonly, they may contain calcite or zeolite growths. While agate geodes are fairly common in other regions of the world, they are not frequently seen in Lake Superior agates. Consequently, they are very desirable, especially when they contain well-formed mineral growths. Most Lake Superior agate geodes have fortification or water-level banding, and they are less likely to be found detached from their host rock due to their fragile nature.
- Agates with colored macrocrystalline quartz, such as amethyst agates and smoky quartz agates, form when natural radiation activates color centers around iron or aluminum impurities in the quartz. Purple (amethyst) and gray (smoky quartz) are uncommon, while yellow, brown, black, and green quartz colorations are rare. Lake Superior agates with colored quartz are very collectible, with vivid colors having higher values.

=== Rare ===
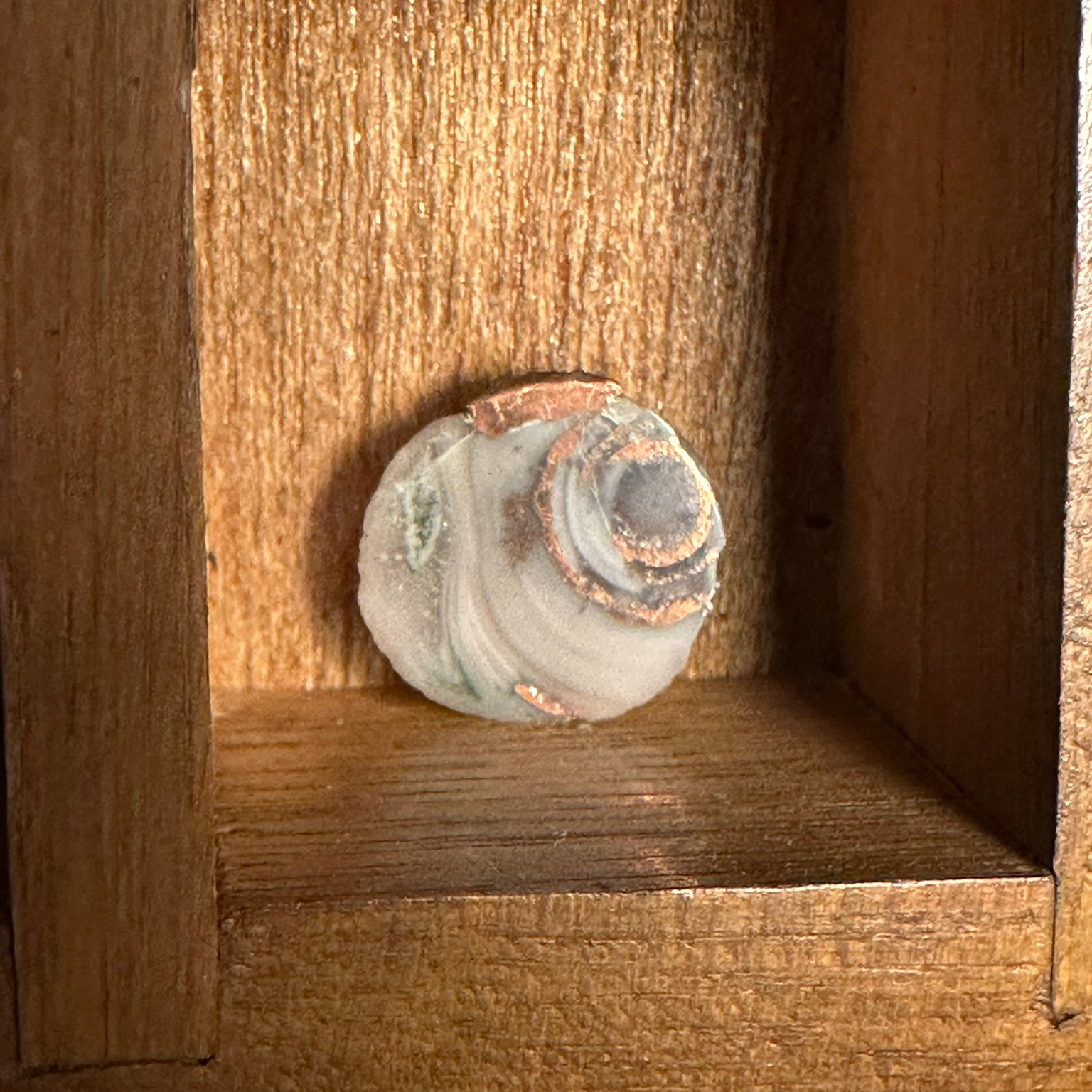
Cut and polished copper replacement agate from Wolverine Mine (about 1 cm in diameter)

- Copper replacement agates have light tan or cream-colored bands alternated with bands of pure native copper. The Keweenaw Peninsula of Michigan is the only locality in the world known to produce agates with copper bands, and they can only be found in a few abandoned copper mine dumps. Most are found still embedded in basalt and coated with green chlorite, making them difficult to identify. Copper replacement agates are one of the most valuable and sought after varieties of Lake Superior agate.
- Rare band colorations in Lake Superior agates include blue, pink, green, bright yellow, and purple. Well-formed agates with bands in one or more of these colors are typically more valuable than agates with more common colors.

== Uses ==
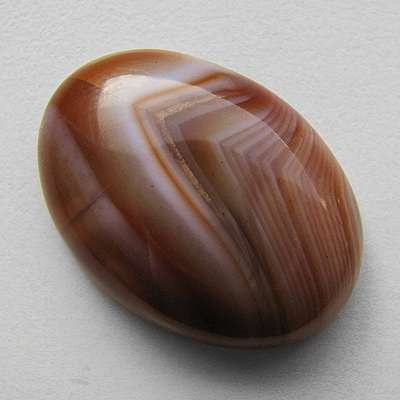
A cabochon of Lake Superior agate

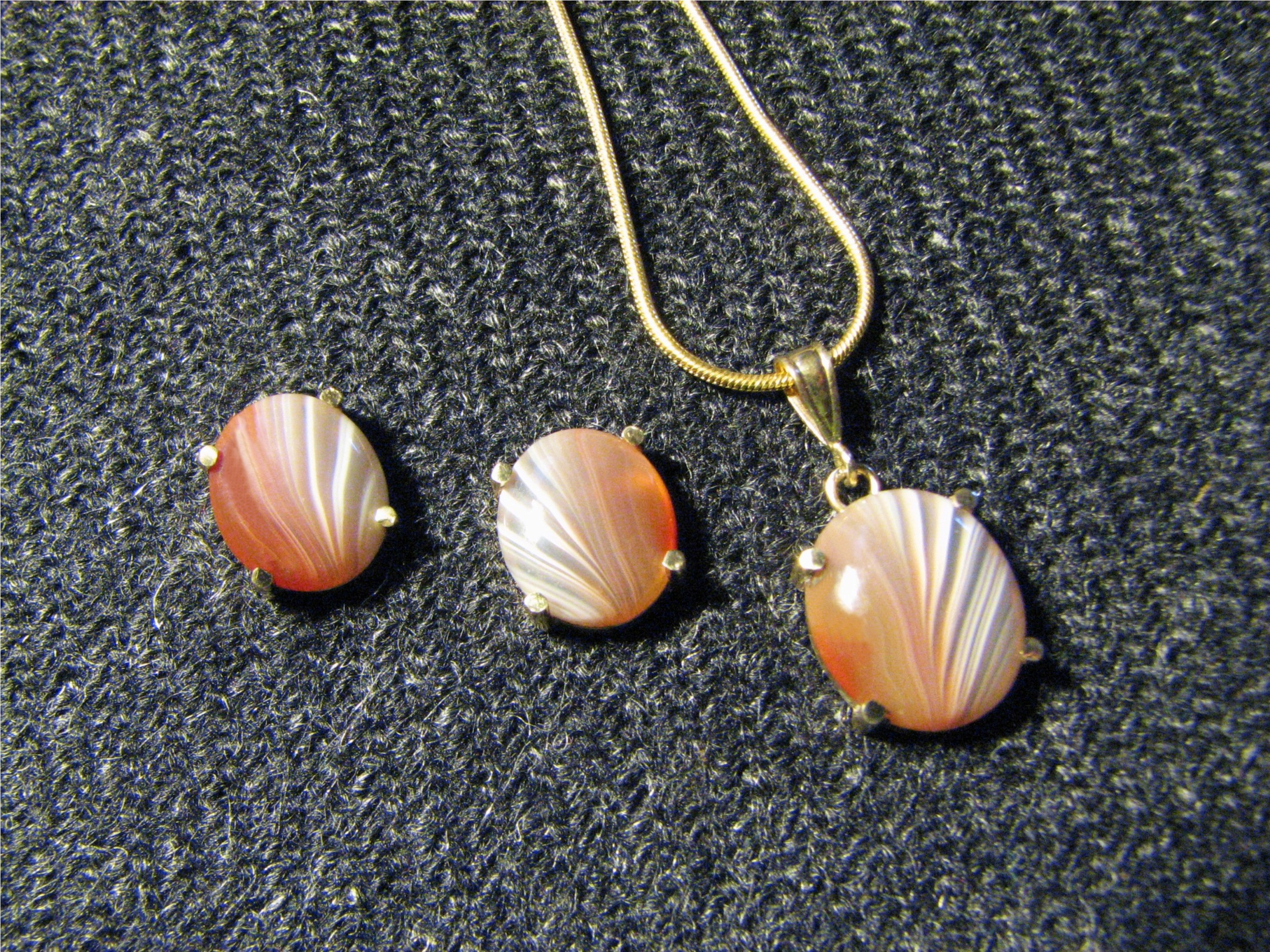
Lake Superior Agate set in 14k gold

Lake Superior agates have been collected for at least a few hundred years, and there is evidence that Native Americans used them to make jewelry and ceremonial objects. They were first described in 1911 by geologist A. C. Lane of the Michigan Geological Survey. In 1969, the Minnesota Legislature designated Lake Superior agate as the official state gemstone.

Today, Lake Superior agate collecting remains a common hobby, and exceptional stones may be valued at hundreds to thousands of dollars. Only a small fraction of Lake Superior agates are considered gemstone-quality. High-quality stones typically have sharp, brightly-colored bands, little to no macrocrystalline quartz, and no visible fractures, and they may contain uncommon features such as eyes or unusual colors such as green or purple. Low-quality stones have visible flaws that cannot be corrected by lapidary techniques, such as numerous fractures, a high proportion of visible quartz, unclear banding, and dark, muddy colors. However, low-quality agates can still have some uses, such as rock tumbling filler and rock gardens.

Multiple lapidary techniques are used on Lake Superior agates, but higher-quality stones can instead simply be coated in a very thin layer of mineral oil to make them shiny and lessen the visibility of small fractures. Large stones or whole nodules with little banding visible on the outside are often cut into slabs with diamond saws, then refined into different shapes and polished into cabochons for use in jewelry. Smaller, medium-quality agates and cut pieces can be tumbled in drums for days to weeks with progressively finer polishing abrasives until they are smooth and shiny. Less commonly, Lake Superior agates are polished to form a curved surface on one side while the rest of the stone is left rough. This technique is called face polishing, and it is useful for whole agate nodules with little banding visible on the surface and when it is desirable to preserve some of the pits or surface staining on the agate's husk.

== Distribution ==
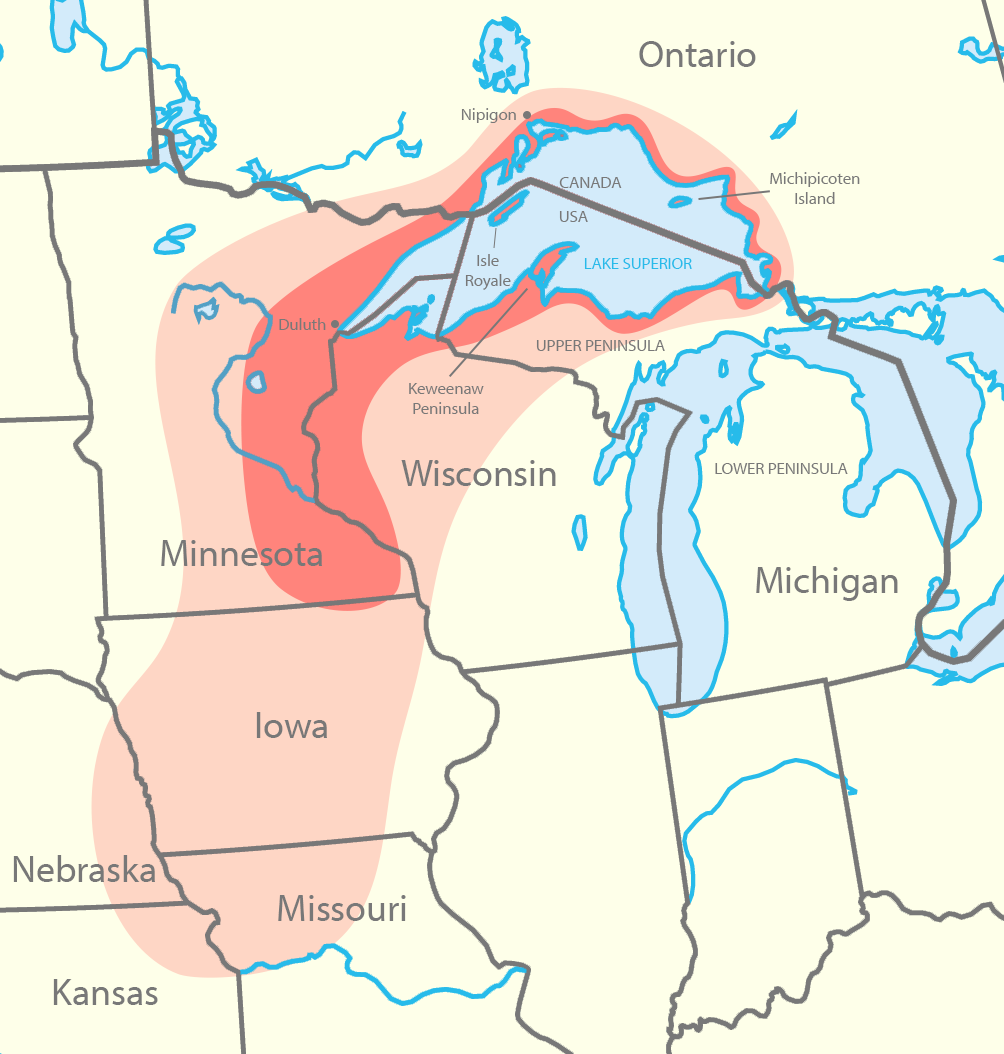
Approximate distribution range of Lake Superior agates. Darker red indicates areas with larger agate deposits.

Lake Superior agates originally formed in Michigan's Keweenaw Peninsula and Isle Royale, Ontario's Michipicoten Island, and along the North Shore of Lake Superior extending from Duluth, Minnesota to Nipigon, Ontario. They can still be found embedded in their host rock in exposed outcrops at these locations. Subsequent glacial activity spread the agates across the rest of the Lake Superior shoreline, east into Michigan's Upper Peninsula, and southwest into several midwestern states. While the largest agate deposits are found surrounding Lake Superior, in eastern Minnesota, and in northwestern Wisconsin, they also extend into central Iowa, eastern Nebraska, northeast Kansas, and northern Missouri. Lake Superior agates have also been found in gravel deposits along the Mississippi River basin, some as far south as Arkansas and Louisiana.

Apart from the shoreline of Lake Superior and their host rock, Lake Superior agates are commonly found wherever there is exposed glacial till or gravel that was mined from glacial till. Likely sources include the shores of inland lakes, riverbanks and beds, rock piles at gravel pits, sand wall formations, road cuts and embankments, gravel roads, farm fields, and landscaping gravel.
