= Soo Line Depot (New Richmond, Wisconsin) =

Railway station in Wisconsin

New Richmond
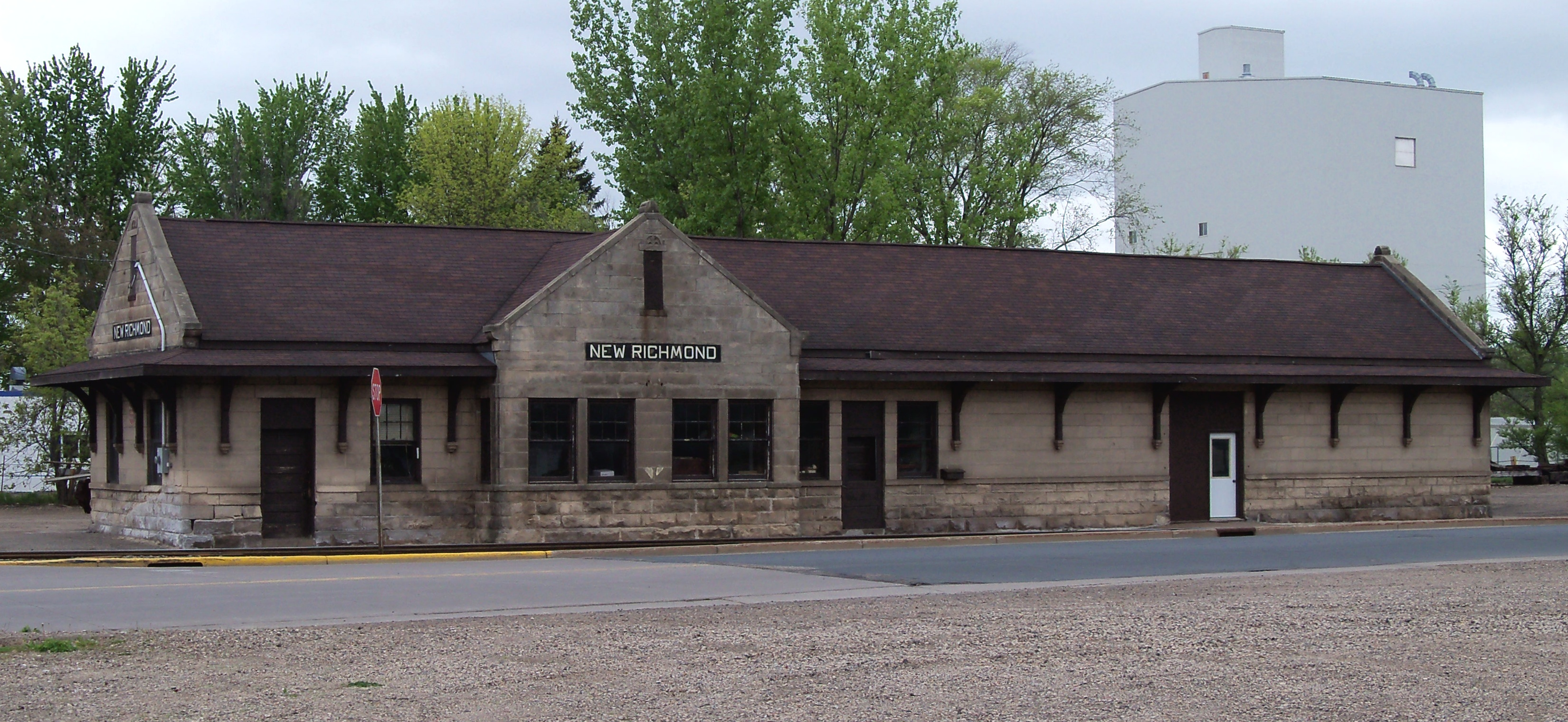
- The New Richmond station in May 2010.

General information
- Location: 120 High Street, New Richmond, Wisconsin 54017
- Coordinates: 45.12636°N 92.53805°W
- System: Former Soo Line passenger rail station

History
- Opened: 1897
- Closed: January 15, 1965
- Rebuilt: 1915

Services
Preceding station	Soo Line	Following station
Withrow toward Portal	Main Line	Cyclon toward Chicago
- Soo Line Depot
- U.S. National Register of Historic Places
- Location within Wisconsin
- Location: 120 High St. New Richmond, Wisconsin
- Coordinates: 45.12636°N 92.53805°W
- Built: 1915
- Architect: Chippewa Construction Co.
- Architectural style: Vernacular
- NRHP reference No.: 88000623
- Added to NRHP: May 31, 1988
Location

The Soo Line Depot is located in New Richmond, Wisconsin.

== History ==
The depot was originally built for Wisconsin Central Railway, which would eventually merge with Soo Line Railroad. It was built to replace a previous depot, which despite having survived a major tornado in 1899, would later be destroyed in a fire. This depot was designed to be fireproof.

Passenger train service to the New Richmond station ended on January 15, 1965, when the Soo Line Laker between Chicago and the Twin Cities was discontinued.

In 1988, the depot was added to the National Register of Historic Places. The following year, it was listed on the State Register of Historic Places.

== See also ==
- Soo Line Depot, a listing of other Soo Line Depots
