= Thief River Falls station =

Thief River Falls
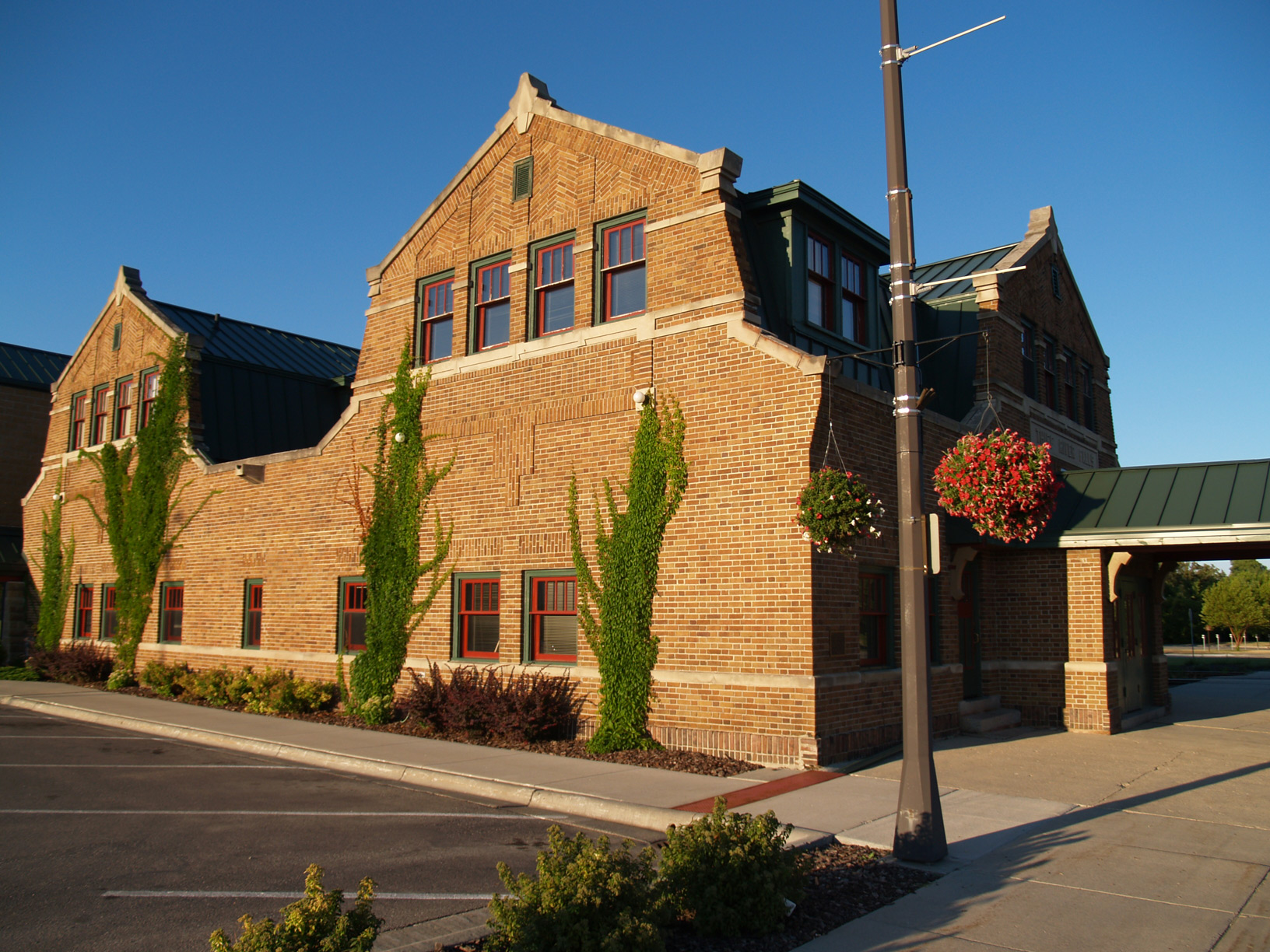
- Thief River Falls station in August 2006.

General information
- Location: 405 Third Street East, Thief River Falls, Minnesota 56701
- System: Former Soo Line passenger rail station

History
- Opened: 1904
- Closed: March 24, 1967
- Rebuilt: 1913

Services
Preceding station	Soo Line	Following station
Newfolden toward Winnipeg	Winnipeg – Glenwood	Hazel toward Glenwood
Rosewood toward Kenmare	Kenmare – Thief River Falls	Terminus
- Minneapolis St. Paul and Sault Ste. Marie Depot
- U.S. National Register of Historic Places
- Location within Minnesota Location within the United States
- Interactive map showing the location for Thief River Falls City Hall
- Location: Jct. of Third St. and Atlantic Ave., Thief River Falls, Minnesota
- Coordinates: 48°07′10″N 96°10′34″W
- Area: less than one acre
- Built: 1913
- Architect: Kenyon, William; Maine, Maurice, et al.
- Architectural style: Bungalow/Craftsman
- NRHP reference No.: 95000852
- Added to NRHP: July 14, 1995
Location

Thief River Falls station is a historic train station in Thief River Falls, Minnesota. The station was built in 1913 to replace an earlier station and saw passenger traffic until 1967. It was listed on the National Register of Historic Places in 1995 as the Minneapolis, St. Paul and Sault Ste. Marie Railroad Depot and now serves as the Thief River Falls city hall.

== History ==
The Minneapolis, St. Paul and Sault Ste. Marie Railroad was not the first railroad to serve Thief River Falls. The St. Paul, Minneapolis and Manitoba Railway originally built a line to St. Hilaire, Minnesota, seven miles south of Thief River Falls, in 1883. Since it was inconvenient to haul freight to St. Hilaire for shipping, Thief River Falls officials decided to give the Great Northern Railway (the successor to the St. Paul, Minneapolis and Manitoba) a $750 incentive to extend the tracks north to Thief River Falls. This extension was completed in October 1892.

In 1888, the Minneapolis, St. Paul and Sault Ste. Marie Railroad was formed when Canadian Pacific helped to finance a merger between three smaller railroads. The new railroad, commonly known as the Soo Line, began construction of a line from Minneapolis to Winnipeg. This route went through territory traditionally served by the Great Northern, which upset James J. Hill, GN's owner. The Soo Line reached Thief River Falls in 1904 and made it a division point, with buildings including a roundhouse, mechanic shop, derrick house, several warehouses, and a passenger depot. Other commercial development in the city followed the railroad's expansion, and Soo Line traffic steadily increased. By 1913, the Soo Line's traffic dwarfed the traffic shipped by the Great Northern, and the company decided to build a large, impressive depot as a sort of triumph over the GN.

The architects, William Kenyon and Maurice Maine, designed the building in the American Craftsman style. The structure measures 140 feet (43 m) by 50 feet (15 m) and is built of brick in a Flemish bond pattern. It has a cross-gambrel roof with shallow parapets and limestone copings. A limestone panel reading "Thief River Falls" stands above the entrance.

At its peak, 13 passenger trains arrived and departed each day. The building was in use as a passenger station until March 24, 1967, when the Soo Line discontinued the Winnipeger passenger train. Local residents formed an organization to preserve the old depot, and in 1994–1995 the City of Thief River Falls renovated and remodeled the building to serve as the city hall. The remodeling preserved important interior features such as the terrazzo floors and the wooden trim and doors in the passenger waiting area. Soo Line 1024, a 2-8-2 Mikado steam locomotive and the only preserved steam locomotive from the Monon Railroad, is on display outside the depot.
