= Moose Lake station =

Historic depot and museum in Moose Lake, Minnesota

Moose Lake
- Moose Lake station in 2026

General information
- Location: 840 Folz Boulevard, Moose Lake, Minnesota 55767
- System: Former Soo Line passenger rail station

History
- Opened: 1873
- Closed: May 16, 1959
- Rebuilt: 1907

Services
Preceding station	Soo Line	Following station
Solana toward Brooten	Brooten – Duluth	Nemadji toward Duluth
Kettle River toward Plummer	Plummer – Moose Lake	Terminus
- Minneapolis, St. Paul, and Sault Ste. Marie Depot
- U.S. National Register of Historic Places
- Location within Minnesota Location within the United States
- Location: 900 Folz Blvd., Moose Lake, Minnesota
- Coordinates: 46°27′14″N 92°46′7″W
- Area: less than one acre
- Built: 1907
- Architect: Soo Line Railroad
- NRHP reference No.: 86003813
- Added to NRHP: March 17, 1994
Location

Moose Lake Depot and Fires of 1918 Museum
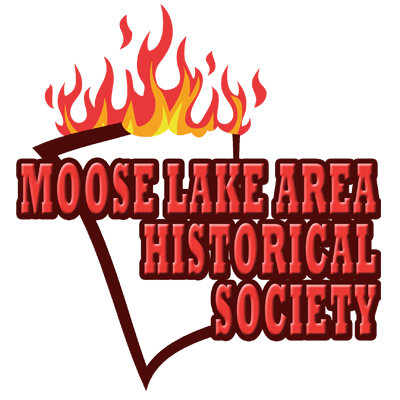

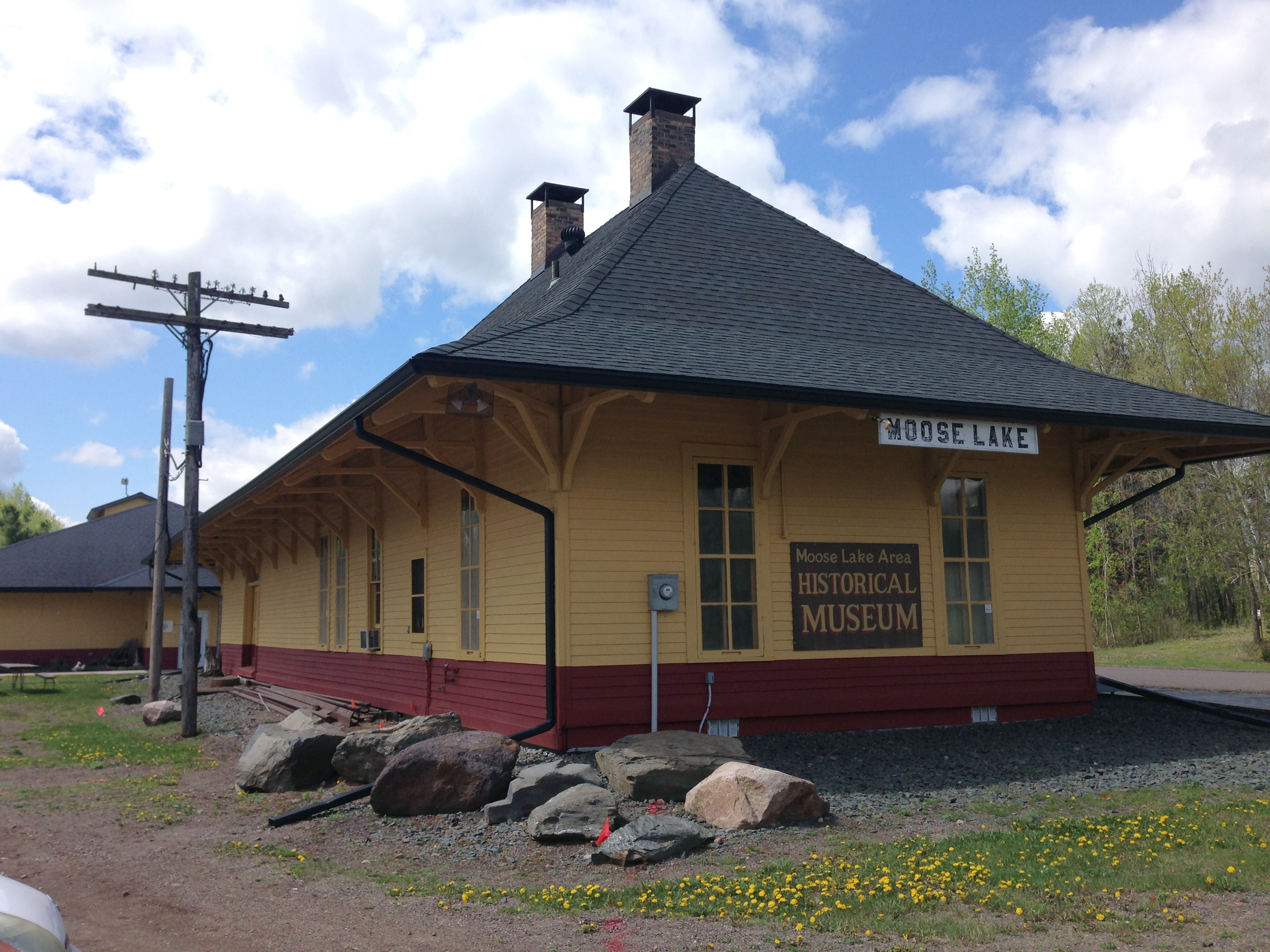
- Established: 1934
- Location: 900 Folz Boulevard, Moose Lake, Minnesota 55767, United States
- Type: Local history
- Website: mooselakeareahistory.com

Moose Lake station in Moose Lake, Minnesota, United States, is a depot built in 1907 by the Soo Line Railroad. The building was one of the few buildings that survived the 1918 Cloquet Fire, and it was used to provide shelter for those left homeless in the fires. It was listed on the National Register of Historic Places in 1994 as the Minneapolis, St. Paul, and Sault Ste. Marie Depot.

The railroad first built a depot in this location in 1873. The 1918 Cloquet Fire started on October 12, 1918, with a background of a hot, dry summer, followed by a fall with little rain. The fire started on a windy day when a spark, possibly thrown from a passing train, ignited nearby brush. Much of the area, from Sturgeon Lake to Moose Lake, Cloquet, and close to Duluth, was devastated by the fire. It killed 453 people, and 52,000 homes were destroyed. The American Red Cross housed the homeless in "fire shacks". The residents of Moose Lake decided to rebuild the community.

Passenger train service to the Moose Lake station ended on May 16, 1959, when trains 64 and 65 were discontinued between Duluth and Thief River Falls. However, mixed train service between Glenwood and Superior through Moose Lake continued until at least 1962.

The Soo Line tracks are now gone, replaced by a recreational trail, the Soo Line Trail.

== Moose Lake Depot and Fires of 1918 Museum ==
House built with materials provided by the Red Cross after the fire, now part of the museum

The depot now serves as the Depot and Fires of 1918 Museum. A main focus of the museum is the Cloquet-Moose Lake Fire of October 12, 1918. This was the largest natural disaster in Minnesota’s history and one of the deadliest wildfires in United States history. Exhibits in the museum tell the story of the fire—how it started, spread, and affected people. Artifacts include photographs and interviews with survivors. Some displays reconstruct living conditions for those who sheltered in the depot or rebuilt their lives afterwards.

The museum also has temporary exhibits that change throughout the year. The exhibitions cover the history of railroads in the Moose Lake area and their connection to local development. Other permanent displays show aspects of early 20th-century life, including a 1920s kitchen and a chapel. Clothing and artifacts from local churches and residents are also presented. The Historical Society, which runs the museum, rotates exhibitions to show different aspects of local history. Operated by the Moose Lake Area Historical Society, The property includes a history center and a small retail boutique. The museum runs seasonally.
