= Loon Lake =

Loon Lake may refer to:

== Lakes ==
A loonlake, loon-lake, or loon lake, easily referred to as the loon equivalent of a duckpond, is a term referring to any lake that is home to loons.

=== United States ===
- Loon Lake (California), El Dorado County
- Loon Lake (Kendall County, Illinois), in the Silver Springs State Fish and Wildlife Area
- Loon Lake (Lake County, Illinois)
- Loon Lake (Indiana), a lake in Indiana
- Loon Lake (Gogebic County, Michigan)
- Loon Lake (Waterford Township, Michigan)
- Loon Lake (Lake County, Montana), in Lake County, Montana
- Loon Lake (Missoula County, Montana), in Missoula County, Montana
- Loon Lake (Steuben County, New York)
- Loon Lake (Warren County, New York)
- Loon Lake (New Hampshire), in Carroll County, New Hampshire
- Loon Lake (Oregon), Douglas County
- Loon Lake (Washington), Stevens County
- Loon Lake (Cass County, Minnesota)
- Loon Lake (Cook County, Minnesota)
- Loon Lake (Jackson County, Minnesota), in Jackson County, Minnesota
- Loon Lake (Waseca County, Minnesota), in Waseca County, Minnesota

=== Canada ===
- Loon Lake (Nova Scotia), the name of several lakes in Nova Scotia
- Loon Lake (Vancouver Island), in British Columbia
- Loon Lake (Lillooet Land District, British Columbia)
- Little Loon Lake, in Saskatchewan

== Locations ==
=== United States ===
- Loon Lake, Illinois
- Loon Lake, Washington
- Loon Lake Township, Cass County, Minnesota, a township in Cass County, Minnesota
- Loon Lake, New York

=== Canada ===
- Loon Lake, Alberta, a hamlet
- Loon Lake, Nova Scotia, a cottage community and a lake
- Loon Lake, British Columbia
- Rural Municipality of Loon Lake No. 561, Saskatchewan, a rural municipality
  - Loon Lake, Saskatchewan, a village
- Loon Lake Indian Reserve No. 10, an Indian Reserve of the Alkali Lake Indian Band in the Central Cariboo region, British Columbia
- Loon Lake Indian Reserve No. 4, an Indian Reserve of the Bonaparte Indian Band in the South Cariboo region of British Columbia
- Loon Lake Provincial Park, a provincial park in Thompson-Nicola Regional District

== Arts and entertainment ==
- Loon Lake (novel), a novel by E. L. Doctorow
- Symphony No. 63, "Loon Lake", Op. 411 by Alan Hovhaness
- Loon Lake (band), an Australian indie rock band
