= Loon Lake (Nova Scotia) =

Loon Lake, (Nova Scotia) could mean the following :

== Community ==
- Loon Lake, Nova Scotia, a community in the Halifax Regional Municipality.
- East Loon Lake Village, a community in the Halifax Regional Municipality at 45°15′33.97″N 62°41′44.52″W

== Lakes ==
=== Cape Breton Regional Municipality ===
- Loon Lake near the community of Broughton at 46°4′47″N 59°58′11″W
- Loon Lake near the community of Rear Boisdale at 46°2′10″N 60°30′8″W

=== Digby County ===
- Loon Lake in Clare District at 44°12′14″N 65°57′54″W
- Loon Lake in Clare District at 44°17′39″N 65°57′10″W

=== Guysborough County ===
- Loon Lake near the community of Indian Harbour at 45°11′39″N 61°50′7″W
- Loon Lake near the community of Goldboro at 45°17′13″N 61°33′30″W

=== Halifax Regional Municipality ===
- Loon Lake (Westphal) in the community of Westphal44°42′3″N 63°30′13″W
- Loon Lake near the community of Murchyville at 44°57′40″N 63°4′45″W
- Loon Lake near the community of Moose River Gold Mines at 45°0′22″N 62°52′27″W
- Loon Lake near the community of Meaghers Grant at 44°51′42″N 63°14′17″W
- Loon Lake near the community of Goffs at 44°47′46″N 63°26′30″W
- Loon Lake near the community of Hatchet Lake at 44°32′8″N 63°42′32″W
- East Loon Lake near the community of Loon Lake at 45°16′16″N 62°42′43″W
- West Loon Lake near the community of Loon Lake at 45°15′57″N 62°43′32″W
- South Loon Lake near the community of Loon Lake at 45°15′38″N 62°43′0″W

=== Kings County ===
- Loon Lake at 44°53′52″N 64°39′59″W

=== Lunenburg County ===
- Loon Lake near New Ross at

44°42′26″N 64°29′45″W

=== Region of Queens Municipality ===
- Loon Lake at 44°19′13″N 65°11′21″W in Kejimkujik National Park

== Other ==
- Loon Lake Channel at 44°55′0″N 64°39′57″W in Kings County
- Loon Lake Falls at 44°19′0″N 65°10′57″W in Kejimkujik National Park
- Loon Lake Stream a river in Digby County at 44°19′0″N 65°30′57″W
