= Casino, Minnesota =

Casino
- Unincorporated community
- Location within Minnesota Location within the United States
- Coordinates: 46°25′37″N 94°32′25″W
- Country: United States
- State: Minnesota
- County: Cass
- Township: May Township
- Elevation: 1,362 ft (415 m)
- Time zone: UTC-6 (Central (CST))
  - Summer (DST): UTC-5 (CDT)
- ZIP code: 56473
- Area code: 218
- GNIS feature ID: 654634

Casino is an unincorporated community in May Township, Cass County, Minnesota, United States, near Motley and Pillager. It is along 49th Avenue SW (Cass County Road 104), near 104th Street SW.
