= Sylvan, Minnesota =

Unincorporated community in Minnesota, US

Sylvan
- Unincorporated community
- Location within Minnesota Location within the United States
- Coordinates: 46°20′06″N 94°24′24″W
- Country: United States
- State: Minnesota
- County: Cass
- Township: Sylvan Township
- Elevation: 1,207 ft (368 m)
- Time zone: UTC-6 (Central (CST))
  - Summer (DST): UTC-5 (CDT)
- ZIP code: 56473
- Area code: 218
- GNIS feature ID: 654970

Sylvan is an unincorporated community in Sylvan Township, Cass County, Minnesota, United States. It is located between Pillager and Baxter along State Highway 210 (MN 210), near 24th Avenue SW.
