= Pillager (disambiguation) =

Pillager is a town in Minnesota, U.S.

It may also refer to:

- One who pillages; see looting
- Pillager Band of Chippewa Indians
