= Bridgeman, Minnesota =

Unincorporated community in Minnesota, US

Bridgeman
- Unincorporated community
- Location within Minnesota Location within the United States
- Coordinates: 46°23′02″N 94°34′50″W
- Country: United States
- State: Minnesota
- County: Cass
- Township: May Township
- Elevation: 1,302 ft (397 m)
- Time zone: UTC-6 (Central (CST))
  - Summer (DST): UTC-5 (CDT)
- ZIP code: 56473
- Area code: 218
- GNIS feature ID: 654615

Bridgeman is an unincorporated community in May Township, Cass County, Minnesota, United States, near Motley and Pillager. It is along 57th Avenue SW (Cass County Road 35) near 116th Street SW.
