= Poplar Township =

Poplar Township may refer to:

- Poplar Township, Cass County, Minnesota
- Poplar Township, Mitchell County, North Carolina, in Mitchell County, North Carolina
