= Loon Lake Township, Cass County, Minnesota =

Loon Lake Township, Minnesota
- Township
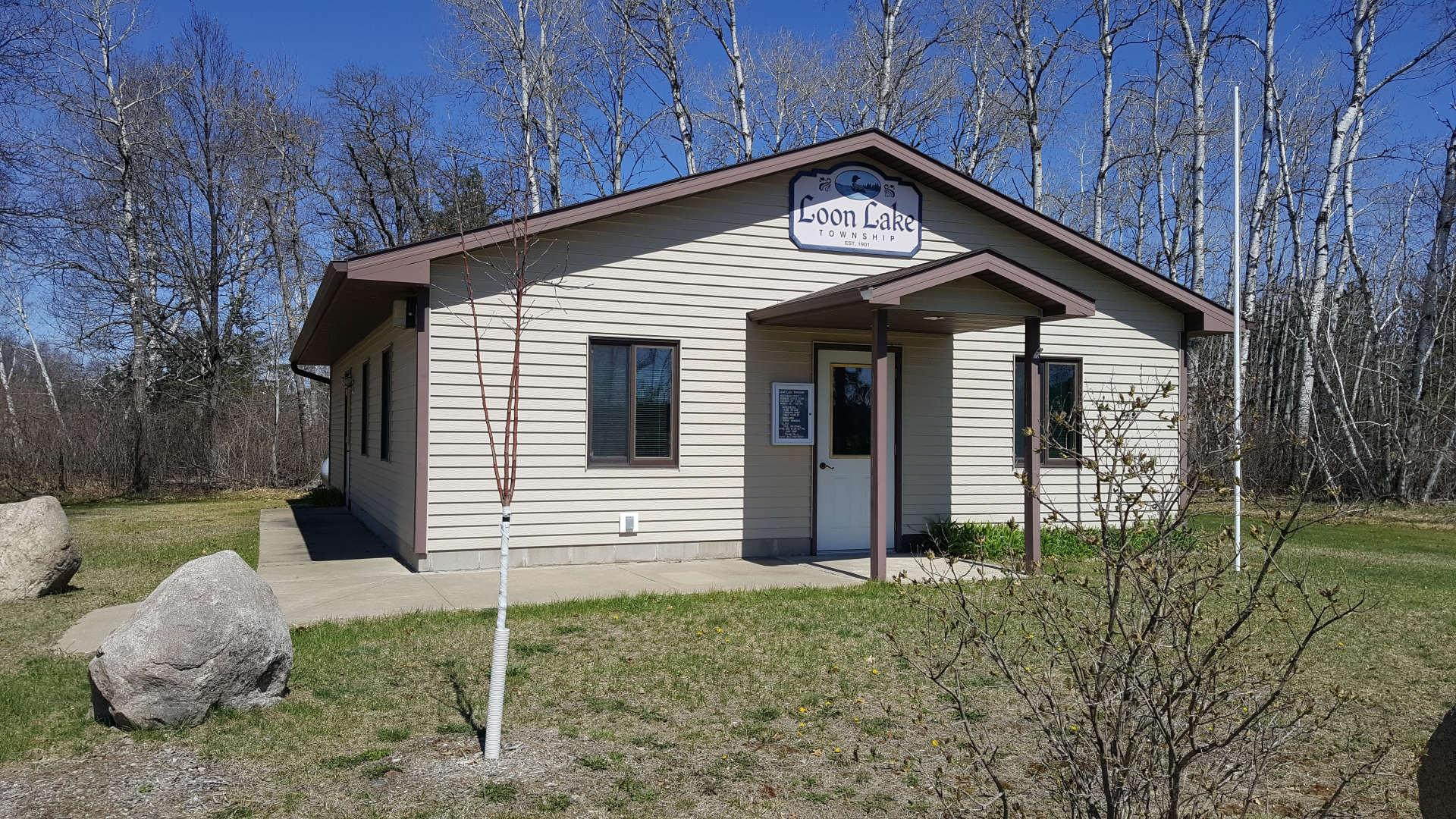
- Loon Lake Township Hall, Cass County, MN

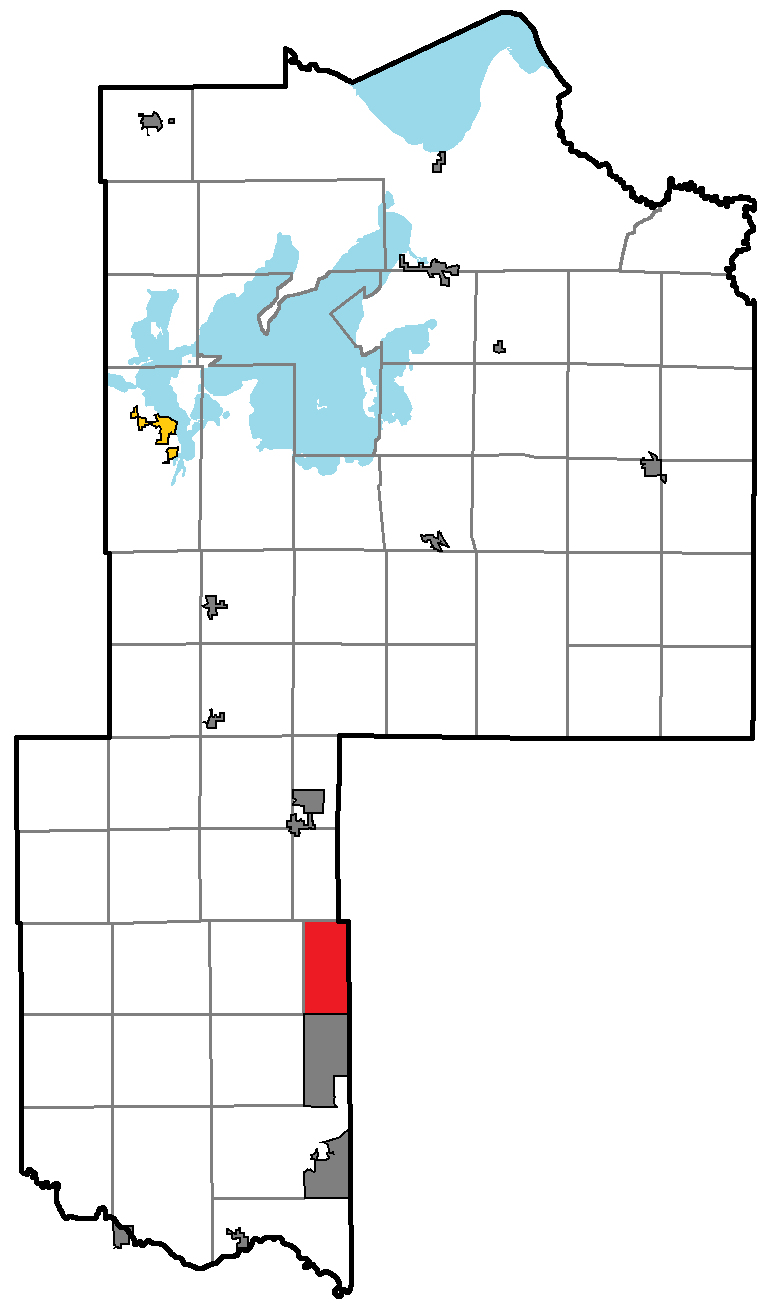
- Location of Loon Lake Township, within Cass County, Minnesota
- Coordinates: 46°35′29″N 94°21′45″W
- Country: United States
- State: Minnesota
- County: Cass

Area
  - Total: 18.0 sq mi (46.5 km^{2})
  - Land: 17.4 sq mi (45.0 km^{2})
  - Water: 0.58 sq mi (1.5 km^{2})
- Elevation: 1,270 ft (387 m)

Population (2020)
  - Total: 626
  - Density: 36.0/sq mi (13.9/km^{2})
- Time zone: UTC-6 (Central (CST))
  - Summer (DST): UTC-5 (CDT)
- ZIP code: 56472
- Area code: 218
- FIPS code: 27-38168
- GNIS feature ID: 0664824

Loon Lake Township is a township in Cass County, Minnesota, United States. The population was 626 as of the 2020 census. This township took its name from Loon Lake.

== Geography ==
According to the United States Census Bureau, the township has a total area of 18.0 square miles (46.5 km^{2}), of which 17.4 square miles (45.0 km^{2}) is land and 0.6 square miles (1.5 km^{2}) (3.28%) is water.

=== Lakes ===
- Loon Lake
- Mayo Lake
- Sibley Lake
- Spring Lake
- Upper Loon Lake

=== Adjacent townships ===
- Wilson Township (north)
- Home Brook Township (southwest)
- Maple Township (west)

== Demographics ==
As of the census of 2000, there were 376 people, 143 households, and 112 families residing in the township. The population density was 21.6 inhabitants per square mile (8.3/km^{2}). There were 185 housing units at an average density of 10.6 per square mile (4.1/km^{2}). The racial makeup of the township was 98.67% White, 0.27% African American, 0.27% Asian, and 0.80% from two or more races.

There were 143 households, out of which 39.2% had children under the age of 18 living with them, 67.8% were married couples living together, 4.2% had a female householder with no husband present, and 21.0% were non-families. 18.2% of all households were made up of individuals, and 6.3% had someone living alone who was 65 years of age or older. The average household size was 2.63 and the average family size was 2.97.

In the township the population was spread out, with 27.7% under the age of 18, 5.6% from 18 to 24, 25.5% from 25 to 44, 29.3% from 45 to 64, and 12.0% who were 65 years of age or older. The median age was 40 years. For every 100 females, there were 108.9 males. For every 100 females age 18 and over, there were 117.6 males.

The median income for a household in the township was $37,750, and the median income for a family was $45,625. Males had a median income of $31,042 versus $27,679 for females. The per capita income for the township was $16,489. About 12.6% of families and 13.1% of the population were below the poverty line, including 11.3% of those under age 18 and 12.8% of those age 65 or over.
