= Ellis, Minnesota =

Unincorporated community in Minnesota, US

Ellis
- Unincorporated community
- Location within Minnesota Location within the United States
- Coordinates: 46°30′51″N 94°41′49″W
- Country: United States
- State: Minnesota
- County: Cass
- Township: Byron Township
- Elevation: 1,332 ft (406 m)
- Time zone: UTC-6 (Central (CST))
  - Summer (DST): UTC-5 (CDT)
- ZIP code: 56466
- Area code: 218
- GNIS feature ID: 654689

Ellis is an unincorporated community in Byron Township, Cass County, Minnesota, United States, near Motley. It is along 79th Avenue SW (Cass County Road 106) near 80th Street SW (County Road 156).
