= Byron Township, Cass County, Minnesota =

Byron Township, Minnesota
- Township
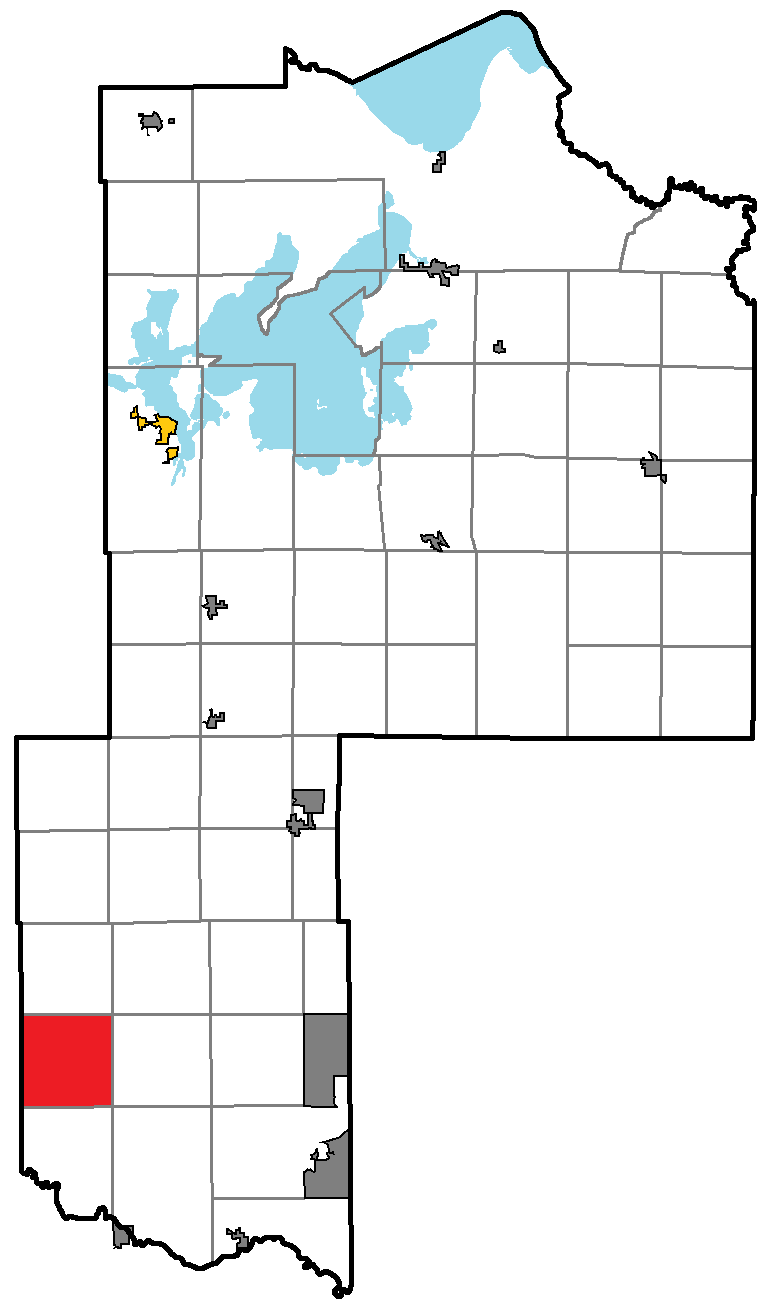
- Location of Byron Township, within Cass County, Minnesota
- Coordinates: 46°30′30″N 94°42′43″W
- Country: United States
- State: Minnesota
- County: Cass

Area
  - Total: 35.9 sq mi (93.0 km^{2})
  - Land: 35.7 sq mi (92.5 km^{2})
  - Water: 0.19 sq mi (0.5 km^{2})
- Elevation: 1,302 ft (397 m)

Population (2020)
  - Total: 151
  - Density: 4.23/sq mi (1.63/km^{2})
- Time zone: UTC-6 (Central (CST))
  - Summer (DST): UTC-5 (CDT)
- FIPS code: 27-09136
- GNIS feature ID: 0663720

Byron Township is a township in Cass County, Minnesota, United States. The population was 151 as of the 2020 census.

== History ==
Byron Township was named for Byron Powell, the first white boy born there.

== Geography ==
According to the United States Census Bureau, the township has a total area of 35.9 square miles (93 km^{2}), of which 35.7 square miles (92 km^{2}) is land and 0.2 square miles (0.52 km^{2}) (0.50%) is water.

=== Unincorporated communities ===
- Ellis

=== Major highway ===
- Minnesota State Highway 64

=== Lakes ===
- Mud Lake
- Pulvers Lake

=== Adjacent townships ===
- Poplar Township (north)
- Moose Lake Township (northeast)
- Meadow Brook Township (east)
- May Township (southeast)
- Becker Township (south)
- Thomastown Township, Wadena County (southwest)
- Bullard Township, Wadena County (west)
- Lyons Township, Wadena County (northwest)

== Demographics ==
At the 2000 census there were 118 people, 48 households, and 33 families in the township. The population density was 3.3 people per square mile (1.3/km^{2}). There were 59 housing units at an average density of 1.7/sq mi (0.6/km^{2}). The racial makeup of the township was 100.00% White. Of the 48 households 25.0% had children under the age of 18 living with them, 64.6% were married couples living together, 4.2% had a female householder with no husband present, and 29.2% were non-families. 27.1% of households were one person and 10.4% were one person aged 65 or older. The average household size was 2.46 and the average family size was 3.03.

The age distribution was 22.0% under the age of 18, 4.2% from 18 to 24, 20.3% from 25 to 44, 36.4% from 45 to 64, and 16.9% 65 or older. The median age was 47 years. For every 100 females, there were 103.4 males. For every 100 females age 18 and over, there were 104.4 males.

The median household income was $29,500 and the median family income was $41,875. Males had a median income of $32,500 versus $15,625 for females. The per capita income for the township was $13,077. There were 3.1% of families and 6.5% of the population living below the poverty line, including 5.6% of under eighteens and 12.0% of those over 64.
