= Loon Lake, Nova Scotia =

Community in Nova Scotia, Canada

Coordinates: 44°42′15″N 63°29′43″W

Lake Loon in Nova Scotia

Lake Loon is a suburban and rural community of the Halifax Regional Municipality in the Canadian province of Nova Scotia. It is named after a nearby lake. The community was created by the Halifax Regional Municipality by the Civic Address office in April 2011 taking a portion of the nearby community of Westphal.

== See also ==
- West Loon Lake, Nova Scotia
