= Home Brook Township, Cass County, Minnesota =

Home Brook Township, Minnesota
- Township
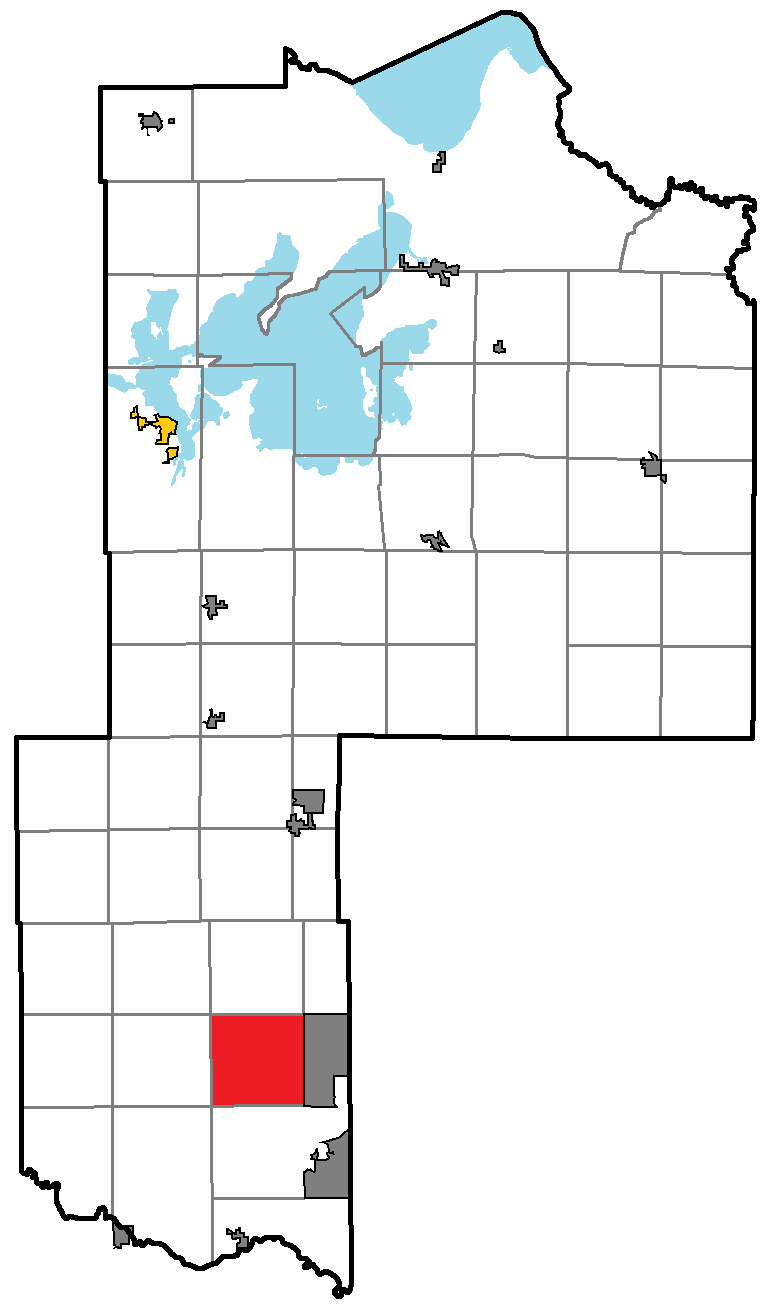
- Location of Home Brook Township, within Cass County, Minnesota
- Coordinates: 46°29′49″N 94°27′25″W
- Country: United States
- State: Minnesota
- County: Cass

Area
  - Total: 36.3 sq mi (93.9 km^{2})
  - Land: 36.0 sq mi (93.3 km^{2})
  - Water: 0.23 sq mi (0.6 km^{2})
- Elevation: 1,270 ft (387 m)

Population (2020)
  - Total: 263
  - Density: 7.30/sq mi (2.82/km^{2})
- Time zone: UTC-6 (Central (CST))
  - Summer (DST): UTC-5 (CDT)
- FIPS code: 27-29978
- GNIS feature ID: 0664512

Home Brook Township is a township in Cass County, Minnesota, United States. The population was 263 as of the 2020 census.

== History ==
Home Brook Township took its name from a post office once located there. A post office called Homebrook was in operation from 1902 until 1913.

== Geography ==
According to the United States Census Bureau, the township has a total area of 36.3 square miles (94 km^{2}), of which 36.0 square miles (93 km^{2}) is land and 0.2 square miles (0.52 km^{2}) (0.61%) is water.

=== Lakes ===
- Goose Lake (southwest edge)
- Hardy Lake (vast majority)
- Moose Lake

=== Adjacent townships ===
- Maple Township (north)
- Loon Lake Township (northeast)
- Fairview Township (south)
- May Township (southwest)
- Meadow Brook Township (west)
- Moose Lake Township (northwest)

=== Cemeteries ===
The township contains Pleasant Hill Cemetery.

== Demographics ==
As of the census of 2000, there were 191 people, 72 households, and 50 families residing in the township. The population density was 5.3 inhabitants per square mile (2.0/km^{2}). There were 84 housing units at an average density of 2.3 per square mile (0.89/km^{2}). The racial makeup of the township was 97.91% White, 0.52% Native American, 1.05% Asian, and 0.52% from two or more races. Hispanic or Latino of any race were 1.57% of the population.

There were 72 households, out of which 27.8% had children under the age of 18 living with them, 55.6% were married couples living together, 6.9% had a female householder with no husband present, and 29.2% were non-families. 25.0% of all households were made up of individuals, and 11.1% had someone living alone who was 65 years of age or older. The average household size was 2.61 and the average family size was 3.04.

In the township the population was spread out, with 24.1% under the age of 18, 7.9% from 18 to 24, 25.1% from 25 to 44, 26.7% from 45 to 64, and 16.2% who were 65 years of age or older. The median age was 41 years. For every 100 females, there were 135.8 males. For every 100 females age 18 and over, there were 123.1 males.

The median income for a household in the township was $34,375, and the median income for a family was $40,208. Males had a median income of $31,250 versus $21,250 for females. The per capita income for the township was $16,303. About 8.2% of families and 13.6% of the population were below the poverty line, including 14.5% of those under the age of eighteen and 45.2% of those 65 or over.
