= Becker Township, Cass County, Minnesota =

Becker Township, Minnesota
- Township
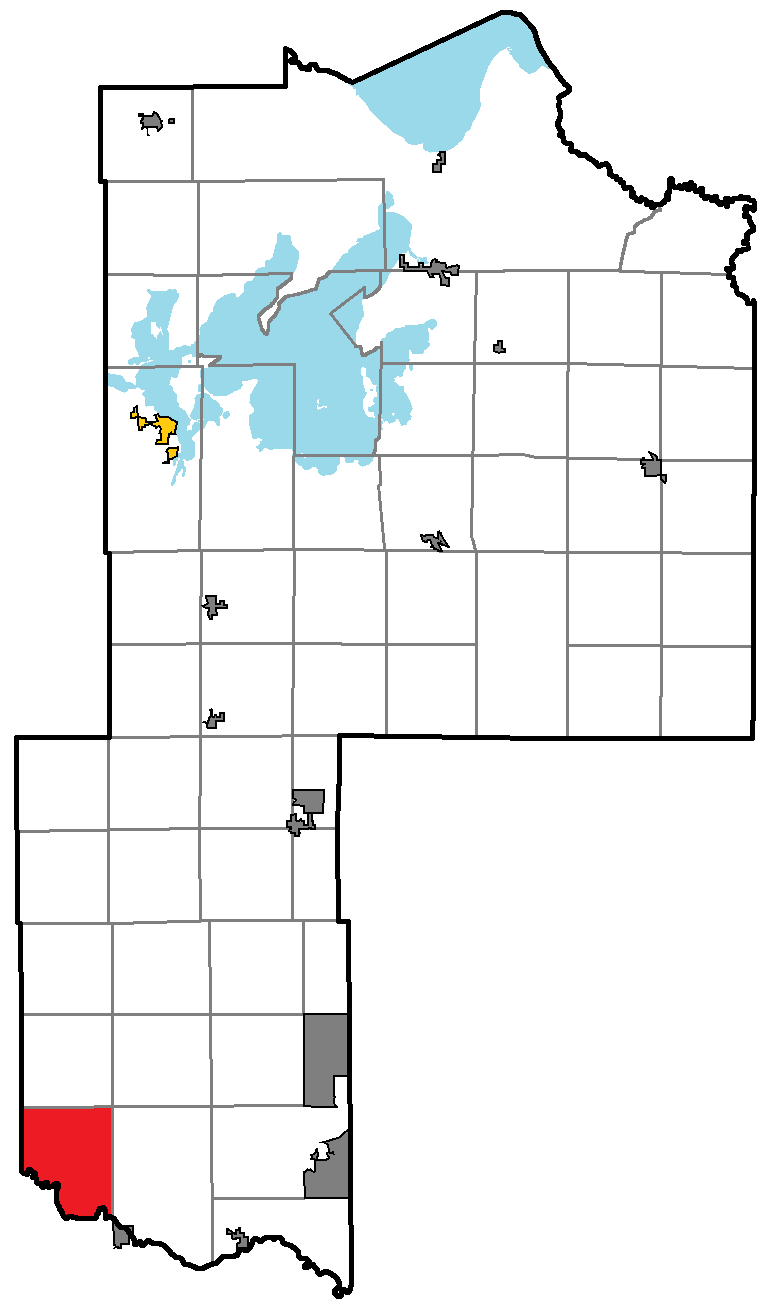
- Location of Becker Township, within Cass County, Minnesota
- Coordinates: 46°24′53″N 94°43′20″W
- Country: United States
- State: Minnesota
- County: Cass

Area
  - Total: 37.3 sq mi (96.6 km^{2})
  - Land: 36.3 sq mi (94.0 km^{2})
  - Water: 1.0 sq mi (2.6 km^{2})
- Elevation: 1,253 ft (382 m)

Population (2020)
  - Total: 484
  - Density: 13.3/sq mi (5.15/km^{2})
- Time zone: UTC-6 (Central (CST))
  - Summer (DST): UTC-5 (CDT)
- FIPS code: 27-04600
- GNIS feature ID: 0663544

Becker Township is a township in Cass County, Minnesota, United States. The population was 484 as of the 2020 census. Becker Township was named for J. A. Becker, a pioneer settler.

== Geography ==
According to the United States Census Bureau, the township has a total area of 37.3 square miles (97 km^{2}), of which 36.3 square miles (94 km^{2}) is land and 1.0 square mile (2.6 km^{2}) (2.66%) is water.

=== Lakes ===
- Cat Lake
- Dog Lake
- Farber Lake
- Johnson Lake
- Mud Lake
- Rice Lake

=== Adjacent townships ===
- Byron Township (north)
- Meadow Brook Township (northeast)
- May Township (east)
- Villard Township, Todd County (south)
- Thomastown Township, Wadena County (west)
- Bullard Township, Wadena County (northwest)

=== Cemeteries ===
The township contains Hallet Family Cemetery.

== Demographics ==
As of the census of 2000, there were 485 people, 169 households, and 129 families residing in the township. The population density was 13.4 inhabitants per square mile (5.2/km^{2}). There were 203 housing units at an average density of 5.6 per square mile (2.2/km^{2}). The racial makeup of the township was 97.32% White, 0.41% Native American, 1.24% Asian, and 1.03% from two or more races.

There were 169 households, out of which 44.4% had children under the age of 18 living with them, 63.3% were married couples living together, 7.7% had a female householder with no husband present, and 23.1% were non-families. 21.3% of all households were made up of individuals, and 8.9% had someone living alone who was 65 years of age or older. The average household size was 2.87 and the average family size was 3.32.

In the township the population was spread out, with 33.0% under the age of 18, 6.4% from 18 to 24, 28.5% from 25 to 44, 24.9% from 45 to 64, and 7.2% who were 65 years of age or older. The median age was 34 years. For every 100 females, there were 104.6 males. For every 100 females age 18 and over, there were 105.7 males.

The median income for a household in the township was $35,795, and the median income for a family was $41,250. Males had a median income of $34,375 versus $23,333 for females. The per capita income for the township was $14,025. About 11.8% of families and 14.6% of the population were below the poverty line, including 11.2% of those under age 18 and 57.7% of those age 65 or over.
