= Fairview Township, Cass County, Minnesota =

Fairview Township, Minnesota
- Township
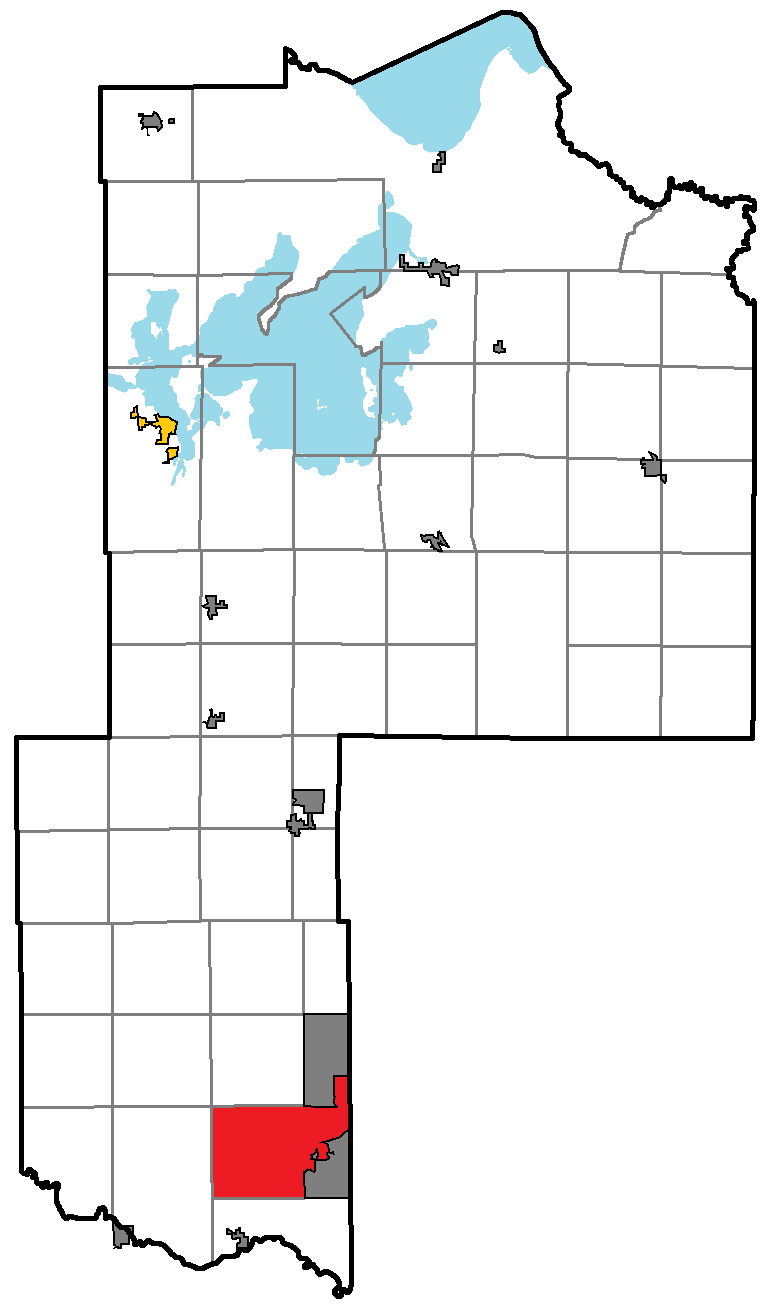
- Location of Fairview Township, within Cass County, Minnesota
- Coordinates: 46°23′52″N 94°26′7″W
- Country: United States
- State: Minnesota
- County: Cass

Area
  - Total: 39.8 sq mi (103.2 km^{2})
  - Land: 35.7 sq mi (92.5 km^{2})
  - Water: 4.1 sq mi (10.7 km^{2})
- Elevation: 1,286 ft (392 m)

Population (2020)
  - Total: 889
  - Density: 24.9/sq mi (9.61/km^{2})
- Time zone: UTC-6 (Central (CST))
  - Summer (DST): UTC-5 (CDT)
- FIPS code: 27-20366
- GNIS feature ID: 0664135
- Website: https://www.fairviewtownshipmn.com/

Fairview Township is a township in Cass County, Minnesota, United States. The population was 889 as of the 2020 census.

== Geography ==
According to the United States Census Bureau, the township has a total area of 39.8 square miles (103 km^{2}), of which 35.7 square miles (92 km^{2}) is land and 4.1 square miles (11 km^{2}) (10.36%) is water.

The west quarter of the city of East Gull Lake is located with Fairview Township geographically but is a separate entity.

=== Lakes ===
- Agate Lake (west half)
- Bass Lake
- Beauty Lake
- Burned Camp Lake
- Dead Horse Lake
- Duffney Lake
- Green Bass Lake
- Gull Lake (west quarter)
- Hardy Lake (southeast edge)
- Harlan Lake (northeast edge)
- Little Long Lake
- Long Lake
- Pillager Lake (north quarter)
- Rock Lake
- Shafer Lake
- Stump Lake
- Sylvan Lake (northwest edge)

=== Adjacent townships ===
- Home Brook Township (north)
- Sylvan Township (southeast)
- May Township (west)
- Meadow Brook Township (northwest)

== Demographics ==
As of the census of 2000, there were 567 people, 224 households, and 180 families residing in the township. The population density was 15.9 inhabitants per square mile (6.1/km^{2}). There were 410 housing units at an average density of 11.5 per square mile (4.4/km^{2}). The racial makeup of the township was 98.24% White, 0.35% African American, 0.18% Native American, 0.53% Asian, and 0.71% from two or more races. Hispanic or Latino of any race were 0.71% of the population.

There were 224 households, out of which 26.8% had children under the age of 18 living with them, 75.0% were married couples living together, 3.1% had a female householder with no husband present, and 19.2% were non-families. 15.2% of all households were made up of individuals, and 4.0% had someone living alone who was 65 years of age or older. The average household size was 2.53 and the average family size was 2.77.

In the township the population was spread out, with 22.9% under the age of 18, 4.1% from 18 to 24, 21.5% from 25 to 44, 37.9% from 45 to 64, and 13.6% who were 65 years of age or older. The median age was 46 years. For every 100 females, there were 105.4 males. For every 100 females age 18 and over, there were 104.2 males.

The median income for a household in the township was $55,000, and the median income for a family was $64,583. Males had a median income of $35,385 versus $24,063 for females. The per capita income for the township was $29,871. About 2.3% of families and 3.5% of the population were below the poverty line, including 2.7% of those under age 18 and 5.9% of those age 65 or over.
