= Graff, Minnesota =

Unincorporated community in Minnesota, US

Graff
- Unincorporated community
- Location within Minnesota Location within the United States
- Coordinates: 46°34′21″N 94°32′49″W
- Country: United States
- State: Minnesota
- County: Cass
- Township: Moose Lake Township
- Elevation: 1,440 ft (440 m)
- Time zone: UTC-6 (Central (CST))
  - Summer (DST): UTC-5 (CDT)
- ZIP code: 56474 and 56472
- Area code: 218
- GNIS feature ID: 654731

Graff is an unincorporated community in Moose Lake Township, Cass County, Minnesota, United States, near Pine River and Pequot Lakes. It is along Cass County Road 24, 64th Street SW, near 51st Avenue SW.
