= Maple Township, Cass County, Minnesota =

Maple Township, Minnesota
- Township
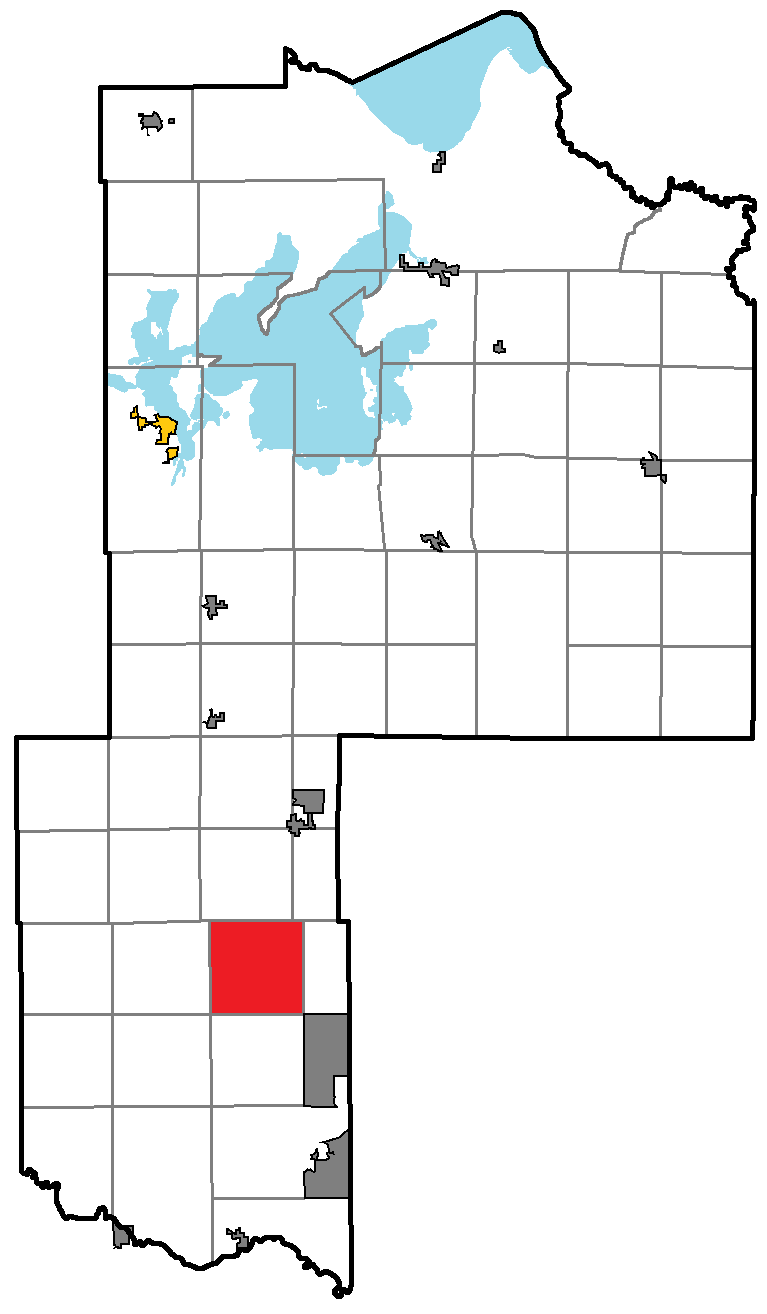
- Location of Maple Township, within Cass County, Minnesota
- Coordinates: 46°35′40″N 94°25′29″W
- Country: United States
- State: Minnesota
- County: Cass

Area
  - Total: 36.6 sq mi (94.7 km^{2})
  - Land: 36.3 sq mi (93.9 km^{2})
  - Water: 0.31 sq mi (0.8 km^{2})
- Elevation: 1,348 ft (411 m)

Population (2020)
  - Total: 407
  - Density: 11.2/sq mi (4.33/km^{2})
- Time zone: UTC-6 (Central (CST))
  - Summer (DST): UTC-5 (CDT)
- ZIP code: 56472
- Area code: 218
- FIPS code: 27-40076
- GNIS feature ID: 0664898
- Website: https://www.mapletownshipmn.com/

Maple Township is a township in Cass County, Minnesota, United States. The population was 407 as of the 2020 census. Maple Township was named from the groves of sugar maple trees within its borders.

== Geography ==
According to the United States Census Bureau, the township has a total area of 36.6 square miles (94.7 km^{2}), of which 36.2 square miles (93.9 km^{2}) is land and 0.3 square mile (0.8 km^{2}) (0.85%) is water.

=== Lakes ===
- Goose Lake (vast majority)
- Omen Lake

=== Adjacent townships ===
- Walden Township (north)
- Wilson Township (northeast)
- Loon Lake Township (east)
- Home Brook Township (south)
- Meadow Brook Township (southwest)
- Moose Lake Township (west)

=== Cemeteries ===
The township contains three cemeteries which include: Grace Lutheran, Lunde and Mayo Creek.

== Demographics ==
As of the census of 2000, there were 291 people, 108 households, and 80 families residing in the township. The population density was 8.0 inhabitants per square mile (3.1/km^{2}). There were 119 housing units at an average density of 3.3 per square mile (1.3/km^{2}). The racial makeup of the township was 99.31% White, and 0.69% from two or more races.

There were 108 households, out of which 38.9% had children under the age of 18 living with them, 64.8% were married couples living together, 3.7% had a female householder with no husband present, and 25.9% were non-families. 24.1% of all households were made up of individuals, and 9.3% had someone living alone who was 65 years of age or older. The average household size was 2.69 and the average family size was 3.20.

In the township the population was spread out, with 29.9% under the age of 18, 6.5% from 18 to 24, 28.2% from 25 to 44, 24.4% from 45 to 64, and 11.0% who were 65 years of age or older. The median age was 36 years. For every 100 females, there were 109.4 males. For every 100 females age 18 and over, there were 129.2 males.

The median income for a household in the township was $36,250, and the median income for a family was $37,000. Males had a median income of $25,000 versus $22,679 for females. The per capita income for the township was $14,583. About 6.1% of families and 8.5% of the population were below the poverty line, including 10.6% of those under the age of eighteen and 6.7% of those 65 or over.
