= May Township, Cass County, Minnesota =

May Township, Minnesota
- Township
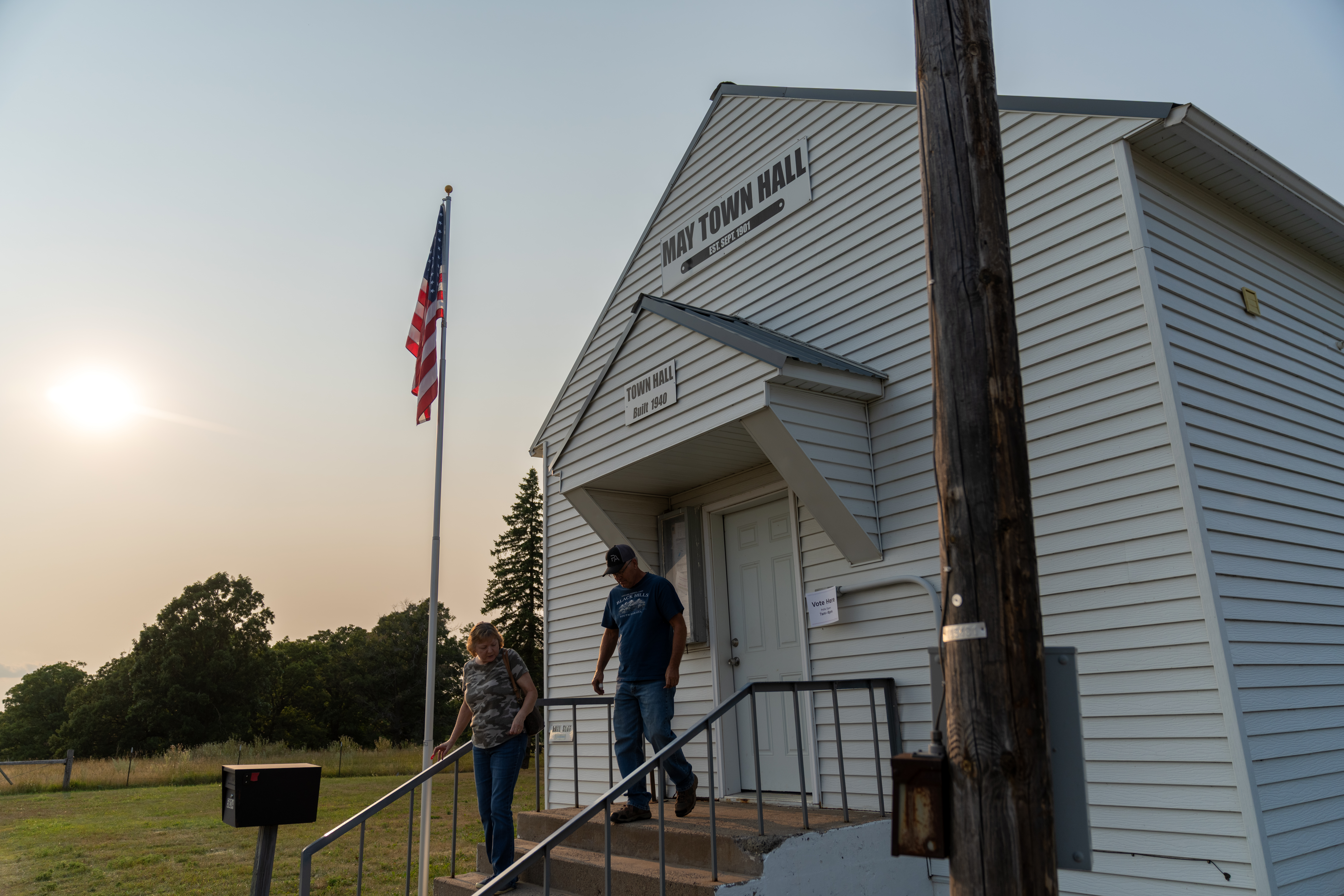
- Voters exit May Town Hall

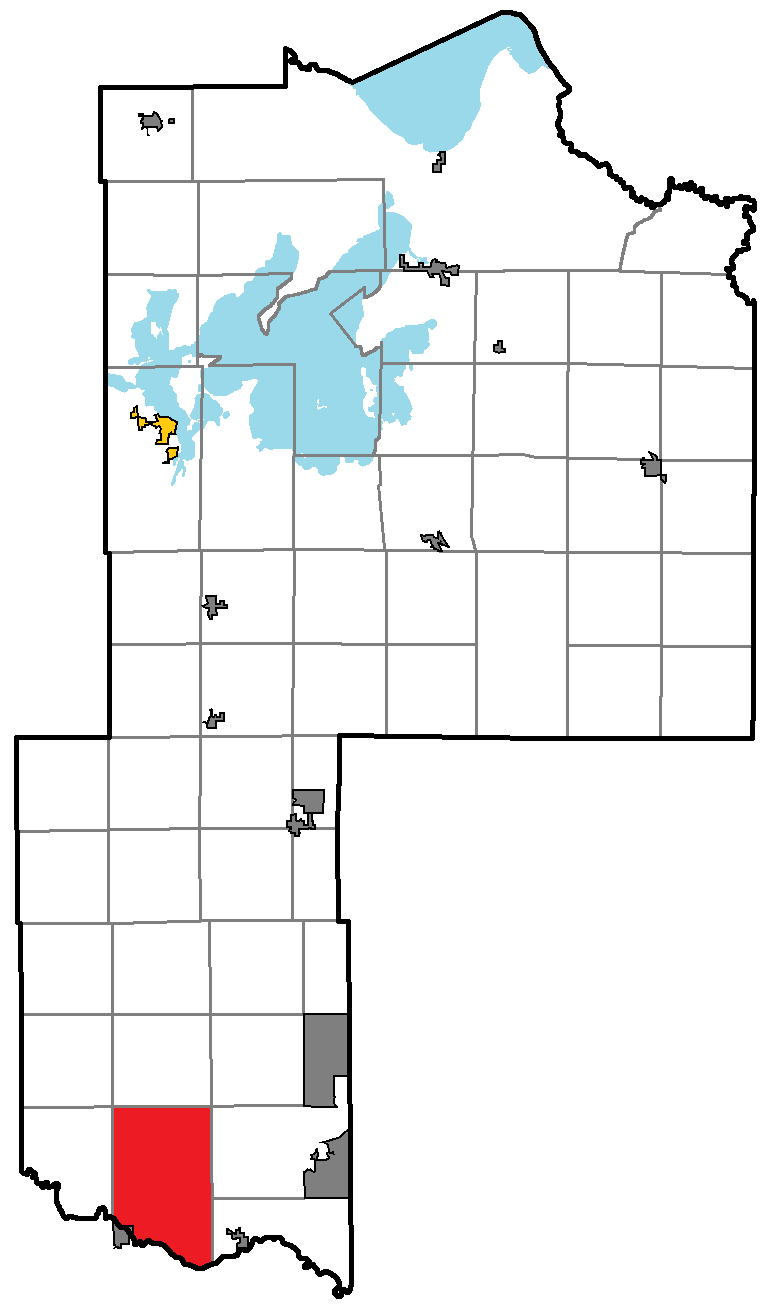
- Location of May Township, within Cass County, Minnesota
- Coordinates: 46°23′N 94°35′W
- Country: United States
- State: Minnesota
- County: Cass

Area
  - Total: 60.6 sq mi (156.9 km^{2})
  - Land: 60.0 sq mi (155.3 km^{2})
  - Water: 0.58 sq mi (1.5 km^{2})
- Elevation: 1,316 ft (401 m)

Population (2020)
  - Total: 842
  - Density: 14.0/sq mi (5.42/km^{2})
- Time zone: UTC-6 (Central (CST))
  - Summer (DST): UTC-5 (CDT)
- FIPS code: 27-41102
- GNIS feature ID: 0664931
- Website: https://maytwp.com/

May Township is a township in Cass County, Minnesota, United States. The population was 842 at the 2020 census. May Township was named for May Griffith, the daughter of a county official.

== Geography ==
According to the United States Census Bureau, the township has a total area of 60.6 square miles (156.9 km^{2}), of which 60.0 square miles (155.3 km^{2}) is land and 0.6 square mile (1.6 km^{2}) (0.99%) is water.

The northeast portion of the city of Motley extends into the southwest corner of May Township geographically but is a separate entity.

=== Unincorporated communities ===
- Bridgeman
- Casino

=== Major highways ===
- Minnesota State Highway 64
- Minnesota State Highway 210

=== Lakes ===
- Doe Lake
- Fucat Lake
- Horseshoe Lake
- Solarz Lake

=== Adjacent townships ===
- Meadow Brook Township (north)
- Home Brook Township (northeast)
- Fairview Township (east)
- Sylvan Township (east)
- Rosing Township, Morrison County (southeast)
- Motley Township, Morrison County (south)
- Villard Township, Todd County (southwest)
- Becker Township (west)
- Byron Township (northwest)

=== Cemeteries ===
The township contains Bridgeman Cemetery.

== Demographics ==
As of the census of 2000, there were 730 people, 265 households, and 205 families residing in the township. The population density was 12.2 inhabitants per square mile (4.7/km^{2}). There were 330 housing units at an average density of 5.5 per square mile (2.1/km^{2}). The racial makeup of the township was 97.95% White, 0.96% Native American, 0.27% Asian, 0.14% from other races, and 0.68% from two or more races. Hispanic or Latino of any race were 1.51% of the population.

There were 265 households, out of which 35.5% had children under the age of 18 living with them, 68.3% were married couples living together, 4.5% had a female householder with no husband present, and 22.3% were non-families. 17.0% of all households were made up of individuals, and 5.3% had someone living alone who was 65 years of age or older. The average household size was 2.75 and the average family size was 3.13.

In the township the population was spread out, with 28.5% under the age of 18, 9.0% from 18 to 24, 25.9% from 25 to 44, 24.9% from 45 to 64, and 11.6% who were 65 years of age or older. The median age was 38 years. For every 100 females, there were 105.6 males. For every 100 females age 18 and over, there were 112.2 males.

The median income for a household in the township was $36,875, and the median income for a family was $40,227. Males had a median income of $26,146 versus $19,063 for females. The per capita income for the township was $14,854. About 6.8% of families and 7.2% of the population were below the poverty line, including 6.6% of those under age 18 and 5.7% of those age 65 or over.
