= Moose Lake Township, Cass County, Minnesota =

Moose Lake Township, Minnesota
- Township
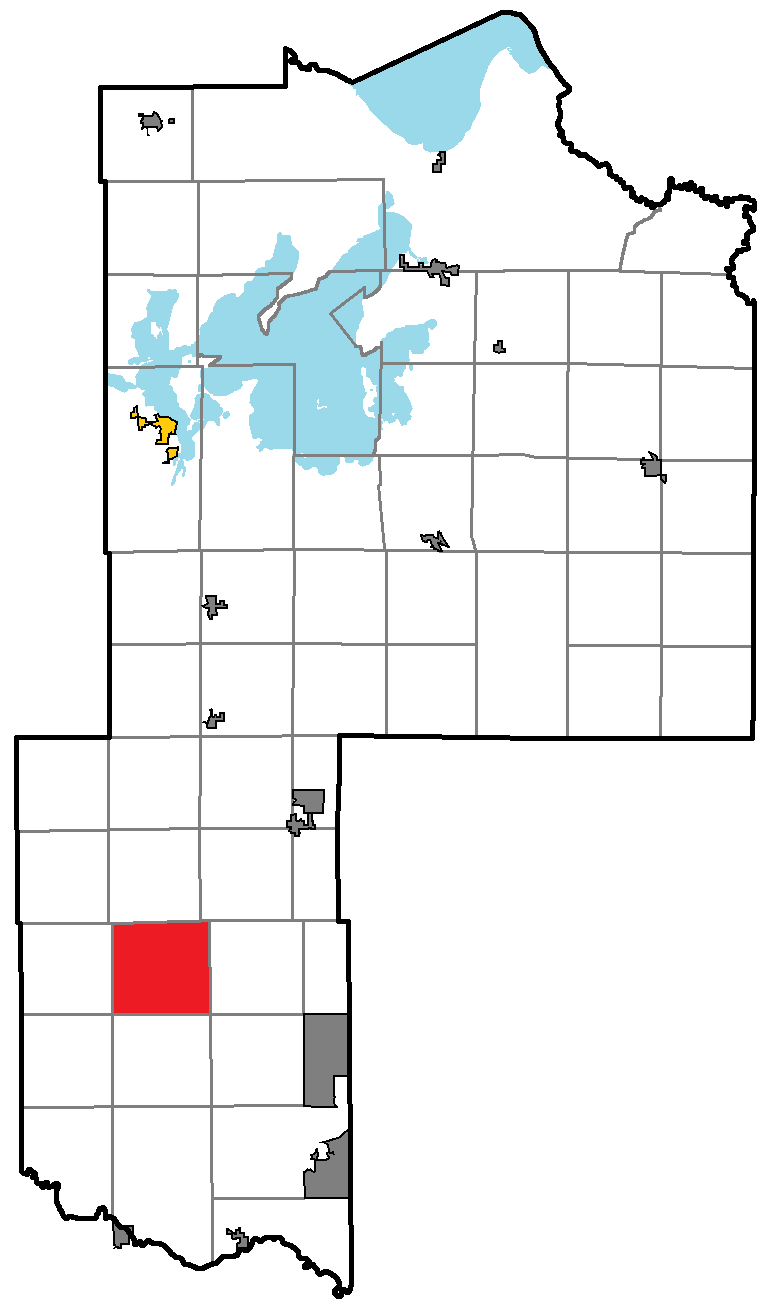
- Location of Moose Lake Township, within Cass County, Minnesota
- Coordinates: 46°35′40″N 94°33′43″W
- Country: United States
- State: Minnesota
- County: Cass

Area
  - Total: 38.7 sq mi (100.2 km^{2})
  - Land: 37.5 sq mi (97.1 km^{2})
  - Water: 1.2 sq mi (3.1 km^{2})
- Elevation: 1,473 ft (449 m)

Population (2020)
  - Total: 134
  - Density: 3.57/sq mi (1.38/km^{2})
- Time zone: UTC-6 (Central (CST))
  - Summer (DST): UTC-5 (CDT)
- FIPS code: 27-43990
- GNIS feature ID: 0665026

Moose Lake Township is a township in Cass County, Minnesota, United States. The population was 134 as of the 2020 census.

== Geography ==
According to the United States Census Bureau, the township has a total area of 38.7 square miles (100.3 km^{2}), of which 37.5 square miles (97.1 km^{2}) is land and 1.2 square miles (3.1 km^{2}) (3.13%) is water.

=== Unincorporated communities ===
- Graff

=== Lakes ===
- Camp Two Lake
- Crooked Lake
- Deer Lake
- Fox Meadow Lake
- Grade Lake
- Hardwood Lake
- Horseshoe Lake
- Kelly Lake
- Long Lake
- Lova Lake
- Milford Lake
- Minnie Lake
- Moore Lake
- Moose Lake
- Rat Lake
- Rob Lake (vast majority)
- Rock Lake
- Round Lake
- Section Thirtysix Lake (northwest half)
- Seven Lakes

=== Adjacent townships ===
- Bungo Township (north)
- Walden Township (northeast)
- Maple Township (east)
- Home Brook Township (southeast)
- Meadow Brook Township (south)
- Byron Township (southwest)
- Poplar Township (west)

=== Cemeteries ===
The township contains Moose Lake Cemetery.

== Demographics ==
As of the census of 2000, there were 142 people, 49 households, and 39 families residing in the township. The population density was 3.8 people per square mile (1.5/km^{2}). There were 61 housing units at an average density of 1.6/sq mi (0.6/km^{2}). The racial makeup of the township was 95.77% White, 2.11% Native American, and 2.11% from two or more races. Hispanic or Latino of any race were 0.70% of the population.

There were 49 households, out of which 38.8% had children under the age of 18 living with them, 63.3% were married couples living together, 8.2% had a female householder with no husband present, and 18.4% were non-families. 18.4% of all households were made up of individuals, and 8.2% had someone living alone who was 65 years of age or older. The average household size was 2.90 and the average family size was 3.18.

In the township the population was spread out, with 28.9% under the age of 18, 12.7% from 18 to 24, 23.9% from 25 to 44, 24.6% from 45 to 64, and 9.9% who were 65 years of age or older. The median age was 35 years. For every 100 females, there were 121.9 males. For every 100 females age 18 and over, there were 129.5 males.

The median income for a household in the township was $43,333, and the median income for a family was $49,583. Males had a median income of $33,750 versus $18,438 for females. The per capita income for the township was $15,687. There were 13.5% of families and 22.3% of the population living below the poverty line, including 30.8% of under eighteens and 36.4% of those over 64.

== In popular culture ==
- Moose Lake was depicted in the 1996 film Fargo, in which the kidnappers hide out in a cabin on the lake. The scene was actually filmed on Square Lake in Stillwater.
- Blu and Linda in the 2011 film Rio lived here at the start of the film.
