= Meadow Brook Township, Cass County, Minnesota =

Meadow Brook Township, Minnesota
- Township
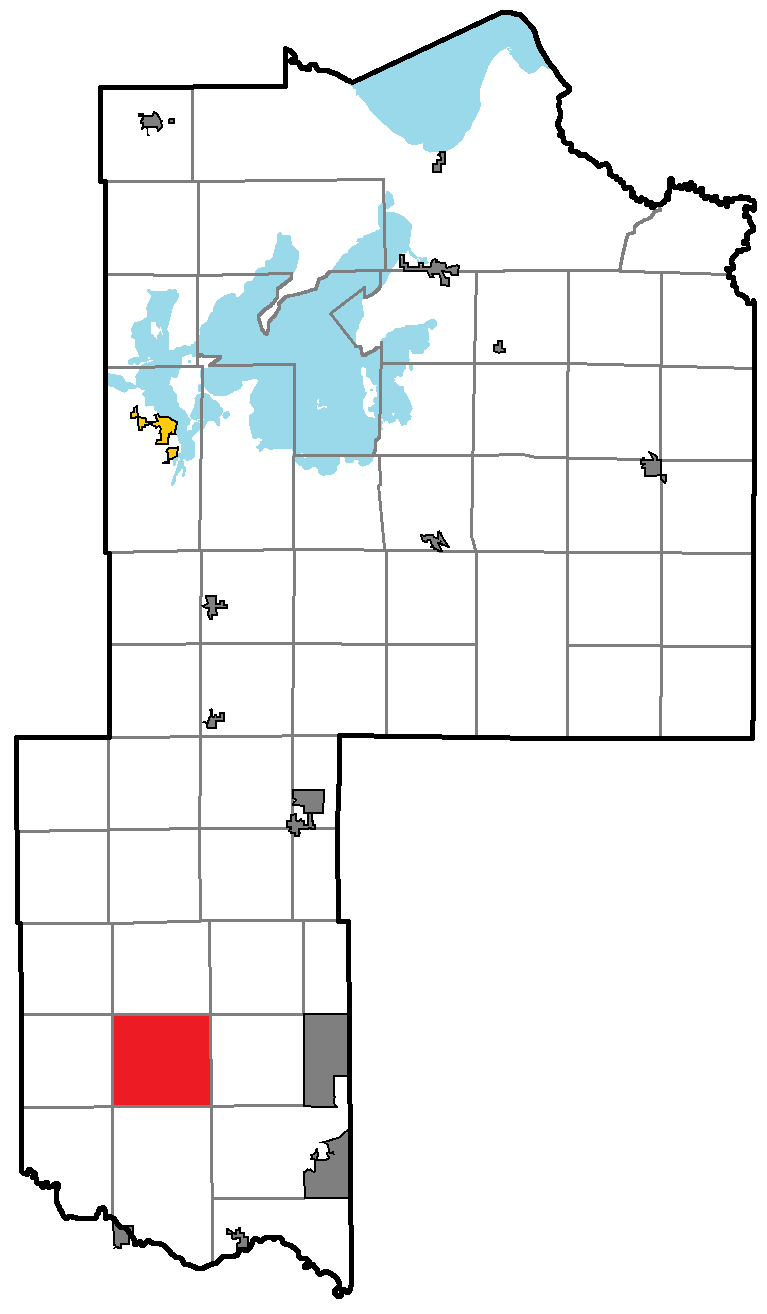
- Location of Meadow Brook Township, within Cass County, Minnesota
- Coordinates: 46°31′7″N 94°33′18″W
- Country: United States
- State: Minnesota
- County: Cass

Area
  - Total: 38.9 sq mi (100.8 km^{2})
  - Land: 38.6 sq mi (99.9 km^{2})
  - Water: 0.35 sq mi (0.9 km^{2})
- Elevation: 1,362 ft (415 m)

Population (2020)
  - Total: 230
  - Density: 6.0/sq mi (2.3/km^{2})
- Time zone: UTC-6 (Central (CST))
  - Summer (DST): UTC-5 (CDT)
- FIPS code: 27-41354
- GNIS feature ID: 0664942

Meadow Brook Township is a township in Cass County, Minnesota, United States. The population was 230 as of the 2020 census. Meadow Brook Township took its name from a stream where a schoolhouse once stood.

== Geography ==
According to the United States Census Bureau, the township has a total area of 38.9 square miles (100.8 km^{2}), of which 38.6 square miles (99.9 km^{2}) is land and 0.3 square miles (0.9 km^{2}) (0.90%) is water.

=== Unincorporated communities ===
- Leader

=== Major highway ===
- Minnesota State Highway 64

=== Lakes ===
- Ackerson Lake
- Clear Lake
- Crooked Lake
- Hogans Lake
- Meadow Lake
- Mud Lake
- Pale Lake
- Round Lake
- Section Thirtysix Lake (southwest half)

=== Adjacent townships ===
- Moose Lake Township (north)
- Maple Township (northeast)
- Home Brook Township (east)
- Fairview Township (southeast)
- May Township (south)
- Becker Township (southwest)
- Byron Township (west)
- Poplar Township (northwest)

== Demographics ==
As of the census of 2000, there were 183 people, 80 households, and 51 families residing in the township. The population density was 4.7 inhabitants per square mile (1.8/km^{2}). There were 230 housing units at an average density of 6.0 per square mile (2.3/km^{2}). The racial makeup of the township was 96.72% White, 1.64% Native American, 0.55% Asian, and 1.09% from two or more races.

There were 80 households, out of which 17.5% had children under the age of 18 living with them, 52.5% were married couples living together, 3.8% had a female householder with no husband present, and 36.3% were non-families. 27.5% of all households were made up of individuals, and 8.8% had someone living alone who was 65 years of age or older. The average household size was 2.29 and the average family size was 2.73.

In the township the population was spread out, with 20.8% under the age of 18, 6.6% from 18 to 24, 23.5% from 25 to 44, 34.4% from 45 to 64, and 14.8% who were 65 years of age or older. The median age was 45 years. For every 100 females, there were 117.9 males. For every 100 females age 18 and over, there were 119.7 males.

The median income for a household in the township was $35,278, and the median income for a family was $36,944. Males had a median income of $37,750 versus $15,625 for females. The per capita income for the township was $14,869. About 19.0% of families and 22.2% of the population were below the poverty line, including 41.3% of those under the age of eighteen and 7.4% of those 65 or over.
