= South Loon Lake =

Coordinates: 45°15′38.8″N 62°43′24.7″W

South Loon Lake in Nova Scotia

South Loon Lake is a community of the Halifax Regional Municipality in the Canadian province of Nova Scotia.
