= Poplar Township, Cass County, Minnesota =

Poplar Township, Minnesota
- Township
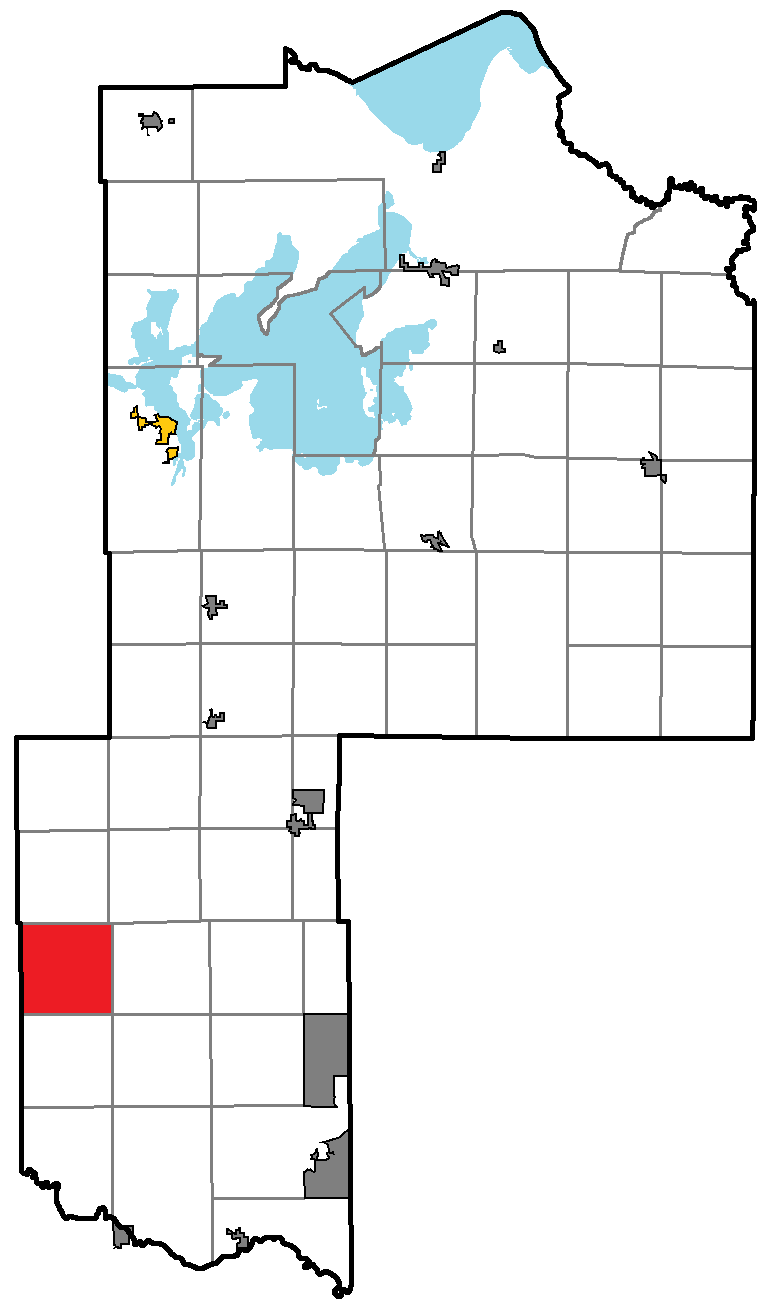
- Location of Poplar Township, within Cass County, Minnesota
- Coordinates: 46°35′39″N 94°42′25″W
- Country: United States
- State: Minnesota
- County: Cass

Area
  - Total: 35.5 sq mi (92.0 km^{2})
  - Land: 35.5 sq mi (92.0 km^{2})
  - Water: 0 sq mi (0.0 km^{2})
- Elevation: 1,332 ft (406 m)

Population (2020)
  - Total: 179
  - Density: 5.04/sq mi (1.95/km^{2})
- Time zone: UTC-6 (Central (CST))
  - Summer (DST): UTC-5 (CDT)
- FIPS code: 27-51964
- GNIS feature ID: 0665337

Poplar Township is a township in Cass County, Minnesota, United States. The population was 179 as of the 2020 census. Poplar Township was named from the groves of poplar trees within its borders.

== Geography ==
According to the United States Census Bureau, the township has a total area of 35.5 square miles (92.0 km^{2}), of which 35.5 square miles (92.0 km^{2}) is land and 0.03% is water.

=== Unincorporated communities ===
- Poplar

=== Major highway ===
- Minnesota State Highway 64

=== Adjacent townships ===
- Ansel Township (north)
- Bungo Township (northeast)
- Moose Lake Township (east)
- Meadow Brook Township (southeast)
- Byron Township (south)
- Bullard Township, Wadena County (southwest)
- Lyons Township, Wadena County (west)

=== Cemeteries ===
The township contains Poplar Cemetery.

== Demographics ==
As of the census of 2000, there were 173 people, 61 households, and 48 families residing in the township. The population density was 4.9 people per square mile (1.9 people/km^{2}). There were 79 housing units at an average density of 2.2 units per square mile (0.85 units/km^{2}). The racial makeup of the township was 96.53% White, 0.58% Native American, and 2.89% from two or more races.

There were 61 households, out of which 39.3% had children under the age of 18 living with them, 65.6% were married couples living together, 8.2% had a female householder with no husband present, and 21.3% were non-families. 18.0% of all households were made up of individuals, and 6.6% had someone living alone who was 65 years of age or older. The average household size was 2.84 and the average family size was 3.17.

In the township the population was spread out, with 26.6% under the age of 18, 12.1% from 18 to 24, 22.0% from 25 to 44, 22.0% from 45 to 64, and 17.3% who were 65 years of age or older. The median age was 39 years. For every 100 females, there were 101.2 males. For every 100 females age 18 and over, there were 108.2 males.

The median income for a household in the township was $36,875, and the median income for a family was $37,188. Males had a median income of $23,750 versus $20,500 for females. The per capita income for the township was $11,915. None of the families and 3.8% of the population were living below the poverty line.
