= West Loon Lake, Nova Scotia =

West Loon Lake in Nova Scotia

West Loon Lake, Nova Scotia is small cottage and recreational community of rural Halifax Regional Municipality Nova Scotia situated at the northeastern corner of the municipality borders the counties of Pictou, and Colchester and Municipal District of Saint Mary's at Trafalgar. A majority of the dwellings are cottages along Loon Lake, the lake which the community derives its name from. The community is on the St. Mary's Rd, between Route 336 and Route 374. The area has an elevation of 180 metres (590 ft) - 230 metres (750 ft), and the community has an area of 5.86 square kilometres (2.26 sq mi).

== East Loon Lake Village ==
East Loon Lake Village, located at 45°15′33.97″N 62°41′44.52″W, is a small cottage community of rural Halifax Regional Municipality bordering Municipal District of Saint Marys on East Loon Lake on Hillcrest Drive off of St. Marys Rd. However, to access the community, one would have to drive through both Colchester and Guysborough County counties.
