= Loon Lake (Cass County, Minnesota) =

Lake in the state of Minnesota, United States

- Location within Minnesota
- Location: Cass County, Minnesota
- Coordinates: 47°5′46″N 93°52′15″W
- Type: lake

Loon Lake is a lake in Cass County, Minnesota, in the United States.

Loon Lake was named after the loon, a water bird native to the area. The name is a translation of the original Ojibway name.

== See also ==
- List of lakes in Minnesota
