= Loon Lake (Lake County, Illinois) =

Lake in Illinois, United States

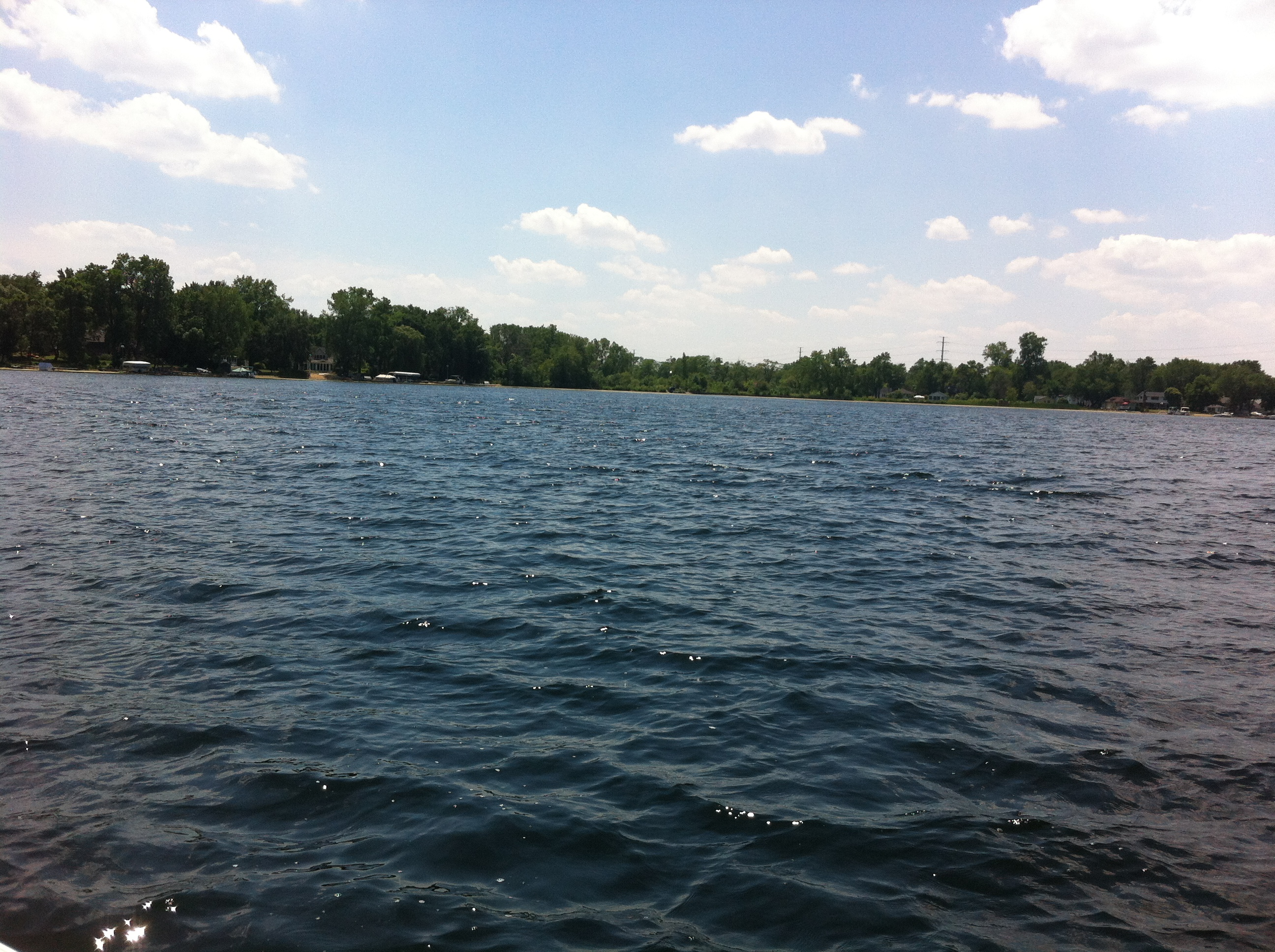

- Location within Illinois Location within the United States
- Location: Lake County, Illinois
- Coordinates: 42°27′11″N 88°05′08″W
- Type: Glacial
- Basin countries: United States
- Surface area: 334 acres (1.4 km^{2})
- Max. depth: 44 ft (13 m)
- Shore length^{1}: 6.9 mi (11.1 km)
- Surface elevation: 771 ft (235 m)
- ^{1} Shore length is not a well-defined measure.

Loon Lake is a glacial lake in northern Lake County, Illinois, United States. It comprises three lakes; East Loon, West Loon, and North Loon. (North Loon is not connected). It is located near the town of Antioch, Illinois, near the intersection of Route 83 and Grass Lake Rd. It is home to many different species of fish, birds, reptiles, and amphibians. Some of which are endangered species, including the blacknose shiner.

== Hydrography ==
West Loon Lake is a glacial lake that has a maximum depth of 38 to 44 feet (12 to 13 m). It has an area of 166 acres (0.7 km^{2}) and more than 2.1 miles (3.4 km) of shoreline. It is an extremely clear lake, transparency of the lake is 15 to 18 feet (4.6 to 5.5 m) depending on the time of year. Water clarity, as of 2008, has been at the highest level in 15 years.

26 to 28 feet (7.9 to 8.5 m). It is slightly larger than West Loon Lake with an area of 168 acres (0.7 km^{2}) and more than 4.8 miles (7.7 km) of shoreline. East Loon has a different ecological makeup; compared to West Loon, it is more of a nature lake then a recreational lake. The clarity of this lake is much poorer than West, only 5 to 7 feet (1.5 to 2.1 m).

== Ecological concerns ==
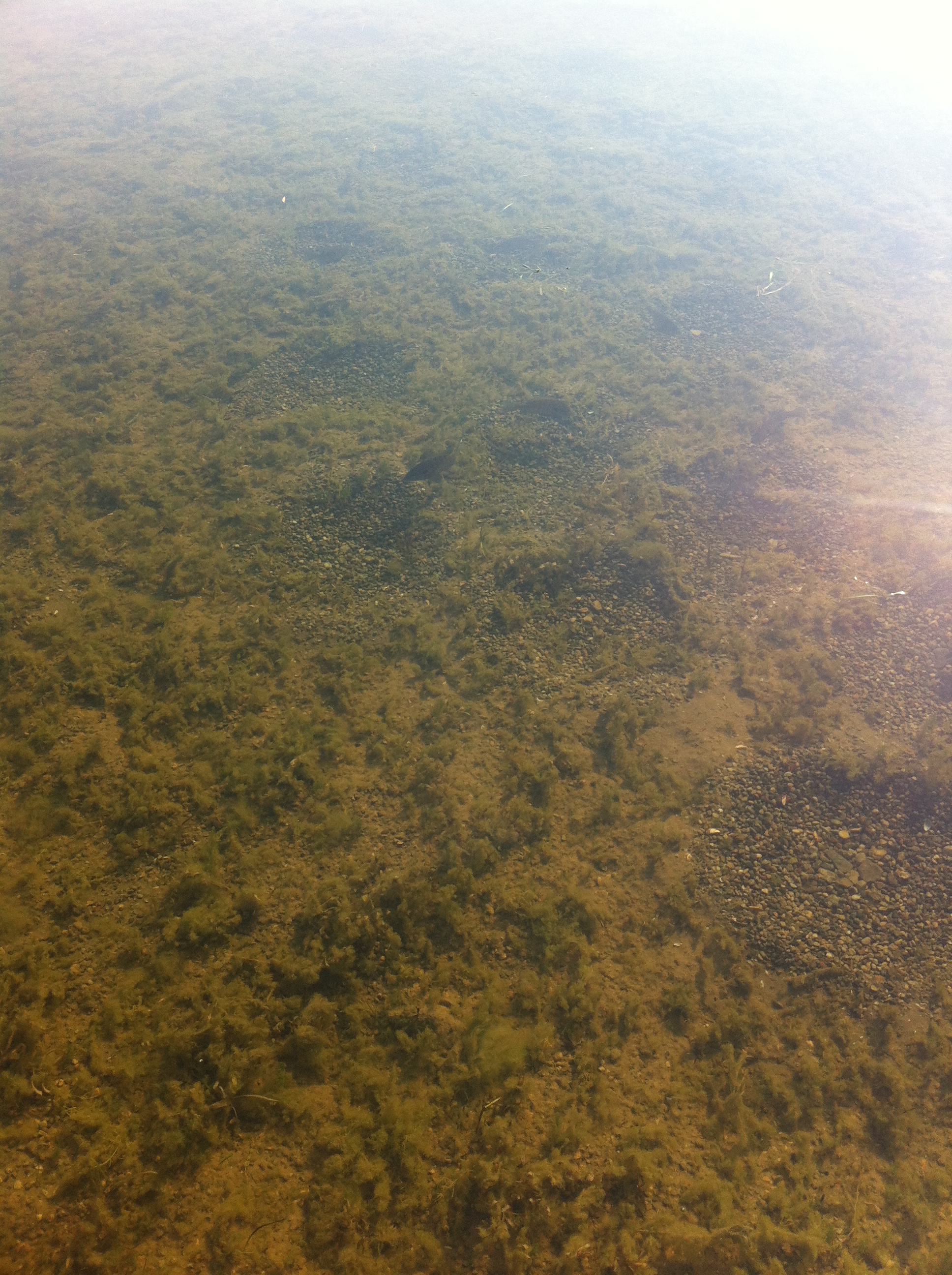

West Loon Lake was used as a source of ice during the late 19th and early 20th century.

Invasive and non-native species have been found in Loon Lake. In August 2005 a Caiman was found in East Loon Lake. Zebra Mussel have been introduced into West and East Loon Lakes; it is not known how exactly they were introduced to the lakes, but it is suspected to come from either Lake Michigan or Geneva Lake in Wisconsin.

Although there are no immediate threats to Loon Lake, development in the area has increased the amount of pollution in the lake. Walmart during the construction of its store located in Antioch has been fined for polluting East Loon Lake.

== Species ==
- Largemouth bass
- Walleye
- Muskellunge
- Northern pike
- Bluegill
- Crappie
- Bowfin
- Carp
- Gar
- Channel cat
- Yellow bullhead
- Yellow perch
- Rock bass
- Pumpkinseed
- Hybrid striped bass
- Western painted turtle
- Common snapping turtle
- Bull-frog
- Leopard frog
- American toad

Warmouth
