= Pillager, Minnesota =

City in Minnesota, United States

Pillager
- City
- Location of Pillager within Cass County, Minnesota
- Coordinates: 46°19′47″N 94°28′47″W
- Country: United States
- State: Minnesota
- County: Cass

Government
  - Mayor: Joseph A Russell

Area
  - Total: 0.88 sq mi (2.27 km^{2})
  - Land: 0.85 sq mi (2.20 km^{2})
  - Water: 0.027 sq mi (0.07 km^{2})
- Elevation: 1,211 ft (369 m)

Population (2020)
  - Total: 507
  - Density: 596.8/sq mi (230.44/km^{2})
- Time zone: UTC−6 (Central (CST))
  - Summer (DST): UTC−5 (CDT)
- ZIP Code: 56473
- Area code: 218
- FIPS code: 27-50902
- GNIS feature ID: 2396203
- Website: https://cityofpillager.com/

Pillager (/ˈpɪlədʒər/ PILL-ə-jər) is a city in Cass County, Minnesota, United States. Its population was 507 at the 2020 census. It is part of the Brainerd Micropolitan Statistical Area.

== History ==
A post office called Pillager has been in operation since 1886. The city was named after the Pillager Band of Chippewa Indians.

== Geography ==
Pillager is located in Sylvan Township (T133N R30W), on the left (north) bank of the Crow Wing River, just east of Lake Placid. According to the United States Census Bureau, the city has a total area of 0.88 square miles (2.28 km^{2}), of which 0.85 square miles (2.20 km^{2}) is land and 0.03 square miles (0.08 km^{2}) water.

Minnesota State Highway 210 and County Road 1 are the main routes in the community.

== Demographics ==
Historical population
Census	Pop.	Note	%±
1910	216		—
1920	354		63.9%
1930	296		−16.4%
1940	348		17.6%
1950	362		4.0%
1960	338		−6.6%
1970	374		10.7%
1980	341		−8.8%
1990	306		−10.3%
2000	420		37.3%
2010	469		11.7%
2020	507		8.1%
U.S. Decennial Census

=== 2010 census ===
As of the 2010 census, there were 469 people, 190 households, and 124 families living in the city. The population density was 551.8 inhabitants per square mile (213.1/km^{2}). There were 218 housing units at an average density of 256.5 units per square mile (99.0 units/km^{2}). The racial makeup of the city was 96.8% White, 0.2% African American, 1.3% Native American, 0.2% Pacific Islander, 0.4% from other races, and 1.1% from two or more races. Hispanic or Latino of any race were 1.3% of the population.

There were 190 households, of which 34.2% had children under the age of 18 living with them, 50.5% were married couples living together, 12.1% had a female householder with no husband present, 2.6% had a male householder with no wife present, and 34.7% were non-families. Of all households, 26.8% were made up of individuals, and 12.1% had someone living alone who was 65 years of age or older. The average household size was 2.47 and the average family size was 2.99.

The median age in the city was 36.1 years. 26% of residents were under the age of 18, 9.4% were between the ages of 18 and 24, 26.2% were from 25 to 44, 21.4% were from 45 to 64, and 17.1% were 65 or older. The gender makeup of the city was 50.7% male and 49.3% female.

=== 2000 census ===
As of the 2000 census, there were 420 people, 167 households, and 106 families living in the city. The population density was 655.3 inhabitants per square mile (253.0/km^{2}). There were 181 housing units at an average density of 282.4 units per square mile (109.0 units/km^{2}). The racial makeup of the city was 97.38% White, 1.43% Native American, 0.95% Asian, and 0.24% from two or more races. Hispanic or Latino of any race were 0.48% of the population.

There were 167 households, out of which 35.3% had children under the age of 18 living with them, 47.3% were married couples living together, 10.2% had a female householder with no husband present, and 36.5% were non-families. Of all households, 28.1% were made up of individuals, and 16.2% had someone living alone who was 65 years of age or older. The average household size was 2.45 and the average family size was 3.03.

In the city, the population was spread out, with 26.4% under the age of 18, 11.7% from 18 to 24, 29.5% from 25 to 44, 19.8% from 45 to 64, and 12.6% who were 65 or older. The median age was 31 years. For every 100 females, there were 112.1 males. For every 100 females age 18 and over, there were 98.1 males.

The median income for a household in the city was $29,375, and the median income for a family was $34,792. Males had a median income of $25,962 versus $18,438 for females. The per capita income for the city was $14,291. About 6.2% of families and 8.0% of the population were below the poverty line, including 10.0% of those under 18 and 3.1% of those aged 65 or over.
